= List of 2016 albums =

The following is a list of albums, EPs, and mixtapes released in 2016. These albums are (1) original, i.e. excluding reissues, remasters, and compilations of previously released recordings, and (2) notable, defined as having received significant coverage from reliable sources independent of the subject.

For additional information about bands formed, reformed, disbanded, or on hiatus, for deaths of musicians, and for links to musical awards, see 2016 in music.

== First quarter ==
=== January ===
List of albums released in January 2016
Go to: January | February | March | April | May | June | July | August | September | October | November | December | Back to top
Release date	Artist	Album	Genre	Label	Ref.
January 1	Rachel Platten	Wildfire	Pop, power pop, soul	Columbia	
January 6	Misia	Love Bebop	Pop, soul, dance-pop	Ariola	
January 8	David Bowie	Blackstar	Art rock, experimental rock, jazz	Columbia, RCA, Sony Music	
January 8	Full of Hell	Amber Mote in the Black Vault	Grindcore	Bad Teeth Recordings	
January 8	Hinds	Leave Me Alone	Garage rock, lo-fi	Mom + Pop	
January 8	Ignite	A War Against You	Melodic hardcore	Century Media	
January 8	Marshmello	Joytime	Future bass, progressive house, trap	Joytime Collective	
January 8	Villagers	Where Have You Been All My Life?	Indie folk	Domino	
January 15	Anderson .Paak	Malibu	Hip-hop, R&B, soul	Steel Wool, OBE, EMPIRE	
January 15	Ben Monder, Pete Rende, Andrew Cyrille, Paul Motian	Amorphae	Jazz	ECM	
January 15	Blaze Ya Dead Homie	The Casket Factory	Gangsta rap, horrorcore	Majik Ninja Entertainment	
January 15	Brothers Osborne	Pawn Shop	Country	EMI Nashville	
January 15	Charles Lloyd & The Marvels	I Long to See You	Jazz	Blue Note	
January 15	Classified	Greatful	Hip-hop	Halflife Records, Universal Music Canada	
January 15	Daughter	Not to Disappear	Alternative pop	4AD	
January 15	Daz and Snoop	Cuzznz	West Coast hip-hop, G-funk	Felder Entertainment Inc.	
January 15	Hank Williams Jr.	It's About Time	Country, Southern rock	Nash Icon	
January 15	Lecrae	Church Clothes 3	Christian hip-hop, conscious hip-hop	Reach	
January 15	Panic! at the Disco	Death of a Bachelor	Pop rock, pop, rock	DCD2, Fueled by Ramen	
January 15	Randy Rogers Band	Nothing Shines Like Neon	Country	Tommy Jackson Records	
January 15	Show of Hands	The Long Way Home	Folk	Hands on Music	
January 15	Skunk Anansie	Anarchytecture	Alternative rock	earMUSIC, Carosello	
January 17	Future	Purple Reign	Trap	Freebandz	
January 21	Jesu and Sun Kil Moon	Jesu/Sun Kil Moon	Post-metal, indie folk, electronic music	Caldo Verde, Rough Trade	
January 22	The Besnard Lakes	A Coliseum Complex Museum	Psychedelic rock, progressive rock, indie rock	Jagjaguwar	
January 22	Cait Brennan	Debutante	Indie rock	Alternative Distribution Alliance	
January 22	Chairlift	Moth	Synth-pop, indie pop, electropop	Columbia	
January 22	Conrad Keely	Original Machines	Rock	Superball	
January 22	Eleanor Friedberger	New View	Indie rock	Frenchkiss	
January 22	Half Japanese	Perfect	Art punk, indie rock	Joyful Noise	
January 22	The I Don't Cares	Wild Stab	Rock	Dry Wood Music	
January 22	John Cale	M:FANS	Experimental rock, industrial rock, electronic	Double Six	
January 22	Lionheart	Love Don't Live Here	Hardcore punk, metalcore	LHHC Records, Beatdown Hardwear Records	
January 22	Megadeth	Dystopia	Thrash metal	Tradecraft, Universal	
January 22	The Mute Gods	Do Nothing till You Hear from Me	Progressive rock, pop rock	Inside Out	
January 22	Mystery Jets	Curve of the Earth	Indie rock	Caroline	
January 22	Roam	Backbone	Pop-punk	Hopeless	
January 22	Rüfüs	Bloom	Alternative dance	Sweat It Out	
January 22	Savages	Adore Life	Post-punk	Matador	
January 22	Shearwater	Jet Plane and Oxbow	Indie rock	Sub Pop	
January 22	Steve Angello	Wild Youth	Indie rock, electro house	Size Records	
January 22	Steven Wilson	4½	Progressive rock	Kscope	
January 22	Suede	Night Thoughts	Art rock	Warner Bros.	
January 22	Tank	Sex Love & Pain II	R&B	Atlantic	
January 22	Tindersticks	The Waiting Room	Chamber pop	City Slang, Lucky Dog	
January 22	Tortoise	The Catastrophist	Post-rock	Thrill Jockey	
January 22	Tricky	Skilled Mechanics	Trip hop	False Idols, !K7 Records	
January 22	Ty Segall	Emotional Mugger	Garage rock, hard rock, glam rock	Drag City	
January 22	Ulver	ATGCLVLSSCAP	Experimental, psychedelic rock	House of Mythology	
January 28	Massive Attack	Ritual Spirit	Trip hop, electronica	Virgin	
January 28	Rihanna	Anti	Pop, dancehall, alternative R&B	Westbury Road, Roc Nation	
January 29	Aubrie Sellers	New City Blues	Country, country pop	Carnival	
January 29	Avantasia	Ghostlights	Symphonic metal, hard rock, power metal	Nuclear Blast	
January 29	Basement	Promise Everything	Alternative rock	Run for Cover	
January 29	Bill Frisell	When You Wish Upon a Star	Jazz	Okeh	
January 29	Black Tusk	Pillars of Ash	Sludge metal, hardcore punk, stoner metal	Relapse	
January 29	Bloc Party	Hymns	Indie rock, alternative dance	Infectious, BMG, Vagrant	
January 29	Bury Tomorrow	Earthbound	Metalcore	Nuclear Blast	
January 29	Charlie Puth	Nine Track Mind	Pop, R&B	Atlantic	
January 29	Dream Theater	The Astonishing	Progressive metal, progressive rock	Roadrunner	
January 29	Kevin Gates	Islah	Hip-hop	Atlantic, Bread Winners' Association	
January 29	Michael W. Smith	Hymns II		The MWS Group	
January 29	Money	Suicide Songs		Bella Union	
January 29	Saul Williams	MartyrLoserKing	Alternative hip-hop	Fader Label	
January 29	Sia	This Is Acting	Pop	Monkey Puzzle, RCA	
January 29	St. Lucia	Matter	Synth-pop	Columbia	
January 29	Tedeschi Trucks Band	Let Me Get By	Blues, rock, R&B	Fantasy	
January 29	Tord Gustavsen, Simin Tander, Jarle Vespestad	What Was Said	Jazz	ECM	
January 29	Wet	Don't You	Indie pop, indie electronic, dream pop	Columbia	
January 29	Yanni	Sensuous Chill	Easy listening, new-age	Portrait, Sony Masterworks	

=== February ===
List of albums released in February 2016
Go to: January | February | March | April | May | June | July | August | September | October | November | December | Back to top
Release date	Artist	Album	Genre	Label	Ref.
February 3	BIGBANG	Made Series	Dance-pop, PBR&B, hip-hop	YG Entertainment, Avex Trax	
February 3	Magnum	Sacred Blood "Divine" Lies	Rock	SPV/Steamhammer	
February 5	Anchor & Braille	Songs for the Late Night Drive Home	Alternative rock, electronic rock, shoegaze	Tooth & Nail	
February 5	Charles Kelley	The Driver	Country	Capitol Nashville	
February 5	The Cult	Hidden City	Hard rock	Cooking Vinyl	
February 5	DIIV	Is the Is Are	Indie rock, shoegaze, krautrock	Captured Tracks	
February 5	Dr. Dog	The Psychedelic Swamp	Indie rock, blues rock, neo-psychedelia	Anti-	
February 5	Drowning Pool	Hellelujah	Alternative metal	eOne	
February 5	Elton John	Wonderful Crazy Night	Rock, soft rock, vocal jazz	Capitol, Mercury	
February 5	Eric Prydz	Opus	House, progressive house, electro house	Virgin	
February 5	Field Music	Commontime	Indie pop, funk	Memphis Industries	
February 5	Fleshgod Apocalypse	King	Symphonic metal	Nuclear Blast	
February 5	Foxes	All I Need	Synth-pop	Sign of the Times, Epic, RCA	
February 5	Junior Boys	Big Black Coat	Electronic, technopop, EDM	City Slang	
February 5	Lion Babe	Begin	R&B, neo soul, electronica	Interscope, Polydor	
February 5	Lucinda Williams	The Ghosts of Highway 20	Country	Highway 20 Records	
February 5	Majid Jordan	Majid Jordan	R&B, PBR&B, synth-pop	OVO Sound, Warner Bros.	
February 5	Obscura	Akrøasis	Progressive metal, technical death metal	Relapse	
February 5	Prong	X – No Absolutes	Groove metal, thrash metal	Steamhammer/SPV	
February 5	Textures	Phenotype	Progressive metal, metalcore	Nuclear Blast	
February 5	Trixie Whitley	Porta Bohemica			
February 5	Wiz Khalifa	Khalifa	Hip-hop	Taylor Gang, Rostrum, Atlantic	
February 6	Future	Evol	Hip-hop, trap	A1, Freebandz, Epic	
February 8	Haywyre	Two Fold Pt. 2	Future bass, house	Monstercat	
February 12	Basia Bulat	Good Advice	Indie pop, folk	Secret City	
February 12	Beyond the Black	Lost in Forever	Symphonic metal, power metal	Airforce1 Records, We Love Music, Universal	
February 12	Daughtry	It's Not Over...The Hits So Far	Alternative rock, hard rock, pop rock	RCA, 19	
February 12	El Guincho	Hiperasia	R&B, Latin	Everlasting Records, Canada	
February 12	The Jezabels	Synthia	Indie rock, alternative rock	Dine Alone	
February 12	Kula Shaker	K2.0	Rock, psychedelic rock, raga rock	StrangeF.O.L.K.	
February 12	Kula Shaker	K 2.0	Rock, psychedelic rock, raga rock	Strange F.O.L.K. Records	
February 12	Lacey Sturm	Life Screams	Hard rock, Christian rock	Followspot Records	
February 12	Lissie	My Wild West	Folk, rock	Lionboy, Thirty Tigers	
February 12	Pinegrove	Cardinal	Americana	Run for Cover	
February 12	Radiation City	Synesthetica	Alternative rock, dream pop	Polyvinyl	
February 12	Ronan Keating	Time of My Life	Pop	Decca	
February 12	Rotting Christ	Rituals	Black metal, dark metal	Season of Mist	
February 12	The Suffers	The Suffers	Soul	Rhyme & Reason Records	
February 12	That Poppy	Bubblebath	Pop	Island	
February 12	Vince Gill	Down to My Last Bad Habit	Country	MCA Nashville	
February 12	Wynonna & the Big Noise	Wynonna & the Big Noise	Country	Curb	
February 14	Currensy and the Alchemist	The Carrollton Heist	Hip-hop	ALC Records, Jet Life	
February 14	Kanye West	The Life of Pablo	Hip-hop	GOOD Music, Def Jam	
February 14	Mýa	Smoove Jones	R&B, soul, hip-hop	Planet 9	
February 15	Illenium	Ashes	Electronic, progressive house, dubstep	Kasaya, Seeking Blue	
February 17	CFCF	On Vacation		International Feel	
February 19	After the Burial	Dig Deep	Progressive metal, djent	Sumerian	
February 19	Animal Collective	Painting With	Psychedelic pop	Domino	
February 19	BJ the Chicago Kid	In My Mind	R&B	Motown	
February 19	Creeper	The Stranger	Horror punk, punk rock	Roadrunner	
February 19	The Fall	Wise Ol' Man	Post-punk	Cherry Red	
February 19	Jack Garratt	Phase	Indie pop, PBR&B	Island	
February 19	Lake Street Dive	Side Pony	Pop, indie pop	Nonesuch	
February 19	Marlon Williams	Marlon Williams	Rock	Caroline Australia	
February 19	Mavis Staples	Livin' on a High Note	R&B, soul, roots rock	Anti-, Epitaph	
February 19	Myrath	Legacy	Progressive metal, Oriental metal, Arabic music	Groove Master Records, King	
February 19	Ra Ra Riot	Need Your Light	Indie rock	Barsuk	
February 19	Ralph Alessi, Gary Versace, Drew Gress, Nasheet Waits	Quiver	Jazz		
February 19	Simple Plan	Taking One for the Team	Pop-punk, punk rock, power pop	Atlantic	
February 19	Venetian Snares	Traditional Synthesizer Music	Breakcore, IDM	Planet Mu	
February 19	Wolfmother	Victorious	Hard rock, heavy metal, stoner rock	Universal	
February 19	Yo Gotti	The Art of Hustle	Hip-hop	Epic, CMG	
February 19	Yoko Ono	Yes, I'm a Witch Too		Manimal	
February 26	The 1975	I Like It When You Sleep, for You Are So Beautiful yet So Unaware of It	Indie rock, new wave, synth-pop	Interscope, Dirty Hit, Polydor	
February 26	Anthrax	For All Kings	Thrash metal	Megaforce, Nuclear Blast	
February 26	Anvil	Anvil Is Anvil	Heavy metal, speed metal	SPV/Steamhammer	
February 26	Bonnie Raitt	Dig In Deep	Rock, blues, Americana	Redwing Records	
February 26	Charli XCX	Vroom Vroom	Experimental pop, wonky pop, electronic	Vroom Vroom Recordings	
February 26	The Dirty Nil	Higher Power	Punk rock, rock and roll	Dine Alone	
February 26	The Gloaming	2	Folk	Brassland	
February 26	Hands Like Houses	Dissonants	Post-hardcore, alternative rock	Rise	
February 26	Lucy Dacus	No Burden	Indie rock, indie folk, power pop	EggHunt, Matador	
February 26	Macklemore & Ryan Lewis	This Unruly Mess I've Made	Hip-hop	Macklemore LLC	
February 26	Quilt	Plaza	Indie folk, psychedelic folk	Mexican Summer	
February 26	Santigold	99¢	Art pop, alternative dance, new wave	Atlantic	
February 26	School of Seven Bells	SVIIB	Indie rock, dream pop, shoegaze	Vagrant, Full Time Hobby	
February 26	Trondheim Jazz Orchestra with Kim Myhr and Jenny Hval	In the End His Voice Will Be the Sound of Paper	Jazz	Hubro Music	
February 26	TV Girl	Who Really Cares	Indie pop		
February 26	Tweet	Charlene	R&B, soul, neo soul	eOne	
February 26	Voivod	Post Society	Progressive metal	Century Media	
February 26	Willie Nelson	Summertime: Willie Nelson Sings Gershwin	Country	Legacy	
February 26	Yuck	Stranger Things	Indie rock, alternative rock	Mamé Records	
February 29	Lemon Demon	Spirit Phone	Pop	Needlejuice	

=== March ===
List of albums released in March 2016
Go to: January | February | March | April | May | June | July | August | September | October | November | December | Back to top
Release date	Artist	Album	Genre	Label	Ref.
March 4	2 Chainz	ColleGrove	Hip-hop, trap	Def Jam	
March 4	Esperanza Spalding	Emily's D+Evolution	Jazz, jazz fusion, funk	Concord	
March 4	Face to Face	Protection	Punk	Fat Wreck Chords	
March 4	Kendrick Lamar	Untitled Unmastered	Hip-hop, jazz rap	Top Dawg, Aftermath, Interscope	
March 4	The Knocks	55	EDM	Big Beat, Neon Gold	
March 4	Låpsley	Long Way Home	Electronic, ambient, alternative R&B	XL	
March 4	Loretta Lynn	Full Circle	Country, Americana, country folk	Sony Legacy	
March 4	Miike Snow	iii	Indie rock, electropop	Downtown	
March 4	Nada Surf	You Know Who You Are		Barsuk, City Slang	
March 4	Ninja Sex Party	Under the Covers	Rock, synth-pop, pop rock		
March 4	Poliça	United Crushers	Synth-pop, indie electronic	Mom + Pop	
March 4	The Qemists	Warrior Sound	Drum and bass	Amazing Record	
March 4	Ray LaMontagne	Ouroboros	Psychedelic rock	RCA	
March 4	Reckless Love	InVader	Glam metal, hard rock	Spinefarm	
March 4	RuPaul	Butch Queen	Dance	RuCo Inc.	
March 4	La Sera	Music for Listening to Music To	Indie pop	Polyvinyl	
March 4	Sister Sparrow & the Dirty Birds	Fowl Play	Rock, Alternative rock	Party Fowl Records, Thirty Tigers	
March 4	Steven Curtis Chapman	Worship and Believe	Worship, Christian pop	Essential Worship, Reunion	
March 4	Thao & the Get Down Stay Down	A Man Alive	Alternative folk	Ribbon Music	
March 4	Tonight Alive	Limitless	Pop rock	Sony Music Australia, Fearless	
March 4	Urthboy	The Past Beats Inside Me Like a Second Heartbeat	Australian hip-hop	Elefant Traks	
March 4	Violent Femmes	We Can Do Anything	Rock	PIAS	
March 8	They Might Be Giants	Phone Power	Alternative rock	Idlewild Recordings, Lojinx	
March 9	Alexandra Stan	Alesta	Dance	Victor, Roton, Global, Warner Bros., Vae Victis, Ego	
March 11	3 Doors Down	Us and the Night	Post-grunge, pop rock, alternative rock	Republic	
March 11	Adore Delano	After Party	Dance, electronic, pop	Producer Entertainment Group	
March 11	Aurora	All My Demons Greeting Me as a Friend	Art pop, electropop	Decca, Glassnote	
March 11	Bethel Music	Have It All	CCM, worship	Bethel Music	
March 11	Brian Fallon	Painkillers	Rock, alternative rock, heartland rock	Island	
March 11	Citizen Way	2.0	Christian music, Christian rock, Christian EDM	Fair Trade	
March 11	Emmy the Great	Second Love		Bella Union	
March 11	Julian Lage	Arclight	Jazz, jazz blues	Mack Avenue	
March 11	Killswitch Engage	Incarnate	Metalcore	Roadrunner	
March 11	Matt Corby	Telluric	Alternative R&B, dream pop	Mercury, Universal Music Australia	
March 11	Nine Lashes	Ascend	Christian rock, electronic rock, pop rock	BEC	
March 11	Van Canto	Voices of Fire	A cappella, power metal	earMUSIC	
March 11	Vijay Iyer and Wadada Leo Smith	A Cosmic Rhythm with Each Stroke	Jazz	ECM	
March 18	Clark	The Last Panthers	Electronic	Warp	
March 18	Dustin Kensrue	Thoughts That Float on a Different Blood	Contemporary folk music, alternative rock, indie rock	Vagrant	
March 18	The Falcon	Gather Up the Chaps	Punk rock	Red Scare Industries	
March 18	Grant-Lee Phillips	The Narrows	Americana, indie rock	Yep Roc	
March 18	Gwen Stefani	This Is What the Truth Feels Like	Pop	Interscope	
March 18	Iggy Pop	Post Pop Depression	Art rock, garage rock, hard rock	Loma Vista	
March 18	James	Girl at the End of the World	Alternative rock	BMG	
March 18	Primal Scream	Chaosmosis		First International, Ignition	
March 18	Redfoo	Party Rock Mansion	Pop	Rykodisc, Party Rock	
March 18	Soul Asylum	Change of Fortune	Alternative rock	Entertainment One	
March 18	Underworld	Barbara Barbara, We Face a Shining Future	Electronic	Universal	
March 18	Violent Soho	Waco	Grunge, Alternative rock	SideOneDummy	
March 18	The Word Alive	Dark Matter	Metalcore, alternative metal	Fearless	
March 24	Azealia Banks	Slay-Z	Hip-hop, EDM		
March 25	American Head Charge	Tango Umbrella	Nu metal	Napalm	
March 25	Amon Amarth	Jomsviking	Melodic death metal	Metal Blade	
March 25	Anthony Hamilton	What I'm Feelin'	R&B	RCA	
March 25	Asking Alexandria	The Black	Metalcore	Sumerian	
March 25	Birdy	Beautiful Lies	Indie folk, indie pop	Atlantic	
March 25	Bob Mould	Patch the Sky	Alternative rock	Merge	
March 25	The Body and Full of Hell	One Day You Will Ache Like I Ache	Sludge metal, grindcore, noise	Neurot	
March 25	Elisa	On	Pop, dance, pop rock	Sugar Music	
March 25	Father	I'm a Piece of Shit	Hip-hop	Awful Records	
March 25	Hana Pestle	Hana	Synth-pop		
March 25	The Joy Formidable	Hitch	Alternative rock	C'mon Let's Drift, Caroline	
March 25	K. Michelle	More Issues Than Vogue	R&B, soul, pop	Atlantic	
March 25	Lincoln Durham	Revelations of a Mind Unraveling	Rock, alternative folk, Southern gothic	Droog Records	
March 25	Metal Church	XI	Heavy metal	Rat Pak	
March 25	Open Mike Eagle and Paul White	Hella Personal Film Festival	Hip-hop	MMG	
March 25	RJD2	Dame Fortune	Hip-hop, soul	RJ's Electrical Connections	
March 25	The Thermals	We Disappear	Indie rock	Saddle Creek	
March 25	Walls of Jericho	No One Can Save You from Yourself	Metalcore, hardcore punk	Napalm	
March 25	White Denim	Stiff	Indie rock, garage rock, progressive rock	Downtown	
March 25	Young Thug	Slime Season 3	Hip-hop	300, Atlantic	
March 25	Zayn	Mind of Mine	Alternative R&B, R&B	RCA	
March 27	dvsn	Sept. 5th	R&B	OVO Sound, Warner Bros.	
March 28	Oh My Girl	Pink Ocean	K-pop	WM	
March 29	Babymetal	Metal Resistance	J-pop, heavy metal	BMD Fox, Toy's Factory	

== Second quarter ==
=== April ===
List of albums released in April 2016
Go to: January | February | March | April | May | June | July | August | September | October | November | December | Back to top
Release date	Artist	Album	Genre	Label	Ref.
April 1	Andrew Bird	Are You Serious	Indie folk	Loma Vista	
April 1	Autolux	Pussy's Dead	Experimental rock, electronic	30th Century Records, Columbia	
April 1	Babyfather	"BBF" Hosted by DJ Escrow	Hip-hop, dub	Hyperdub	
April 1	Black Stone Cherry	Kentucky	Hard rock, Southern rock, alternative metal	Mascot	
April 1	Bombino	Azel	Blues, folk	Partisan	
April 1	Charles Bradley	Changes	Soul	Daptone	
April 1	Cheap Trick	Bang, Zoom, Crazy... Hello	Rock	Big Machine	
April 1	The Comet Is Coming	Channel the Spirits	Nu jazz	The Leaf Label	
April 1	Explosions in the Sky	The Wilderness	Post-rock	Temporary Residence Limited	
April 1	The Field	The Follower	Ambient techno, techno	Kompakt	
April 1	Frankie Cosmos	Next Thing	Indie pop	Bayonet Records	
April 1	Gareth Emery	100 Reasons to Live	EDM	Garuda, Armada	
April 1	Hammock	Everything and Nothing	Ambient	Hammock Music	
April 1	The Heavy	Hurt & the Merciless	Indie rock, funk rock, blues rock	Counter Records, Bad Son Recording Company	
April 1	Kaada/Patton	Bacteria Cult	Experimental	Ipecac	
April 1	Kaitlyn Aurelia Smith	Ears	Electronic, new-age, ambient pop	Western Vinyl	
April 1	The Last Shadow Puppets	Everything You've Come to Expect	Indie rock	Domino	
April 1	Laura Gibson	Empire Builder	Rock	City Slang	
April 1	Melvins	Three Men and a Baby	Sludge metal, noise rock, powerviolence	Sub Pop	
April 1	Moderat	III	Electronic	Monkeytown	
April 1	Mogwai	Atomic	Post-rock	Rock Action	
April 1	Pet Shop Boys	Super	Synth-pop	x2	
April 1	Tacocat	Lost Time	Pop-punk	Hardly Art	
April 1	Terrace Martin	Velvet Portraits	R&B, jazz fusion, G-funk	Sounds of Crenshaw, Ropeadope	
April 1	Weezer	Weezer (White Album)	Alternative rock, power pop, pop-punk	Atlantic, Crush	
April 1	Yeasayer	Amen & Goodbye	Experimental rock	Mute	
April 6	Gallant	Ology	Alternative R&B	Mind of a Genius	
April 8	Álex Anwandter	Amiga	Latin alternative, pop rock	Nacional	
April 8	All Saints	Red Flag	Pop, R&B	London	
April 8	Art Bergmann	The Apostate	Alternative rock	weewerk	
April 8	Ben Harper & The Innocent Criminals	Call It What It Is	Rock, blues rock, pop rock	Stax	
April 8	Black Peaks	Statues		Easy Life, RED Music	
April 8	The Dandy Warhols	Distortland	Neo-psychedelia	Dine Alone	
April 8	Deftones	Gore	Alternative metal, post-metal, experimental rock	Reprise	
April 8	Frightened Rabbit	Painting of a Panic Attack	Indie rock	Atlantic	
April 8	Future of the Left	The Peace & Truce of Future of the Left	Noise rock	Prescriptions Music	
April 8	Ihsahn	Arktis	Progressive metal, black metal, experimental metal	Candlelight	
April 8	Jean-Michel Blais	Il	Minimal, neoclassical	Arts & Crafts	
April 8	JJ Weeks Band	As Long as We Can Breathe	Worship, Christian pop, Christian rock	Centricity	
April 8	The Lumineers	Cleopatra	Americana, folk rock, indie folk	Dualtone	
April 8	M83	Junk	Synth-pop	Naïve, Mute	
April 8	Mayer Hawthorne	Man About Town		Vagrant	
April 8	Niki and the Dove	Everybody's Heart Is Broken Now	Pop	TEN Music Group	
April 8	Parquet Courts	Human Performance	Indie rock, art punk, experimental rock	Rough Trade	
April 8	Ronnie Spector	English Heart	Pop rock	429	
April 8	Teleman	Brilliant Sanity	Indie pop	Moshi Moshi	
April 8	Tim Hecker	Love Streams	Experimental	4AD, Paper Bag	
April 8	Woods	City Sun Eater in the River of Light		Woodsist	
April 13	Ace Frehley	Origins Vol. 1	Hard rock	Entertainment One	
April 15	Bear Hands	You'll Pay for This	Experimental rock, indie rock, post-punk	Spensive Records	
April 15	Blaqk Audio	Material	Electronic, new wave	Blaqknoise, Kobalt	
April 15	Cate Le Bon	Crab Day	Neo-psychedelia, indie pop, art pop	Drag City, Turnstile, Caroline International	
April 15	The Coathangers	Nosebleed Weekend	Punk rock	Suicide Squeeze	
April 15	Del Barber & the No Regretzkys	The Puck Drops Here		True North	
April 15	Fanfare Ciocărlia	Onwards to Mars!	Balkan brass	Asphalt Tango Records	
April 15	Graham Nash	This Path Tonight	Folk rock	Blue Castle	
April 15	J Dilla	The Diary	Hip-hop	Pay Jay Productions, Mass Appeal	
April 15	John Carpenter, Cody Carpenter and Daniel Davies	Lost Themes II	Electronic	Sacred Bones	
April 15	Keb' Mo'	Keb' Mo' Live – That Hot Pink Blues Album		Kind of Blue Music, RED Distribution	
April 15	Kevin Morby	Singing Saw	Folk rock, indie folk	Dead Oceans	
April 15	Lush	Blind Spot	Indie pop, dream pop, shoegaze	Edamame	
April 15	Mr. Lif	Don't Look Down	Hip-hop	MMG	
April 15	Otep	Generation Doom	Nu metal	Napalm	
April 15	PJ Harvey	The Hope Six Demolition Project	Indie rock	Island	
April 15	Sam Beam and Jesca Hoop	Love Letter for Fire	Indie folk	Sub Pop	
April 15	Santana	Santana IV	Latin rock		
April 15	Sturgill Simpson	A Sailor's Guide to Earth	Country soul, alternative country	Atlantic	
April 15	Suuns	Hold/Still		Secretly Canadian	
April 15	Wild Belle	Dreamland	Psychedelic pop, alternative rock, indie pop	Columbia	
April 16	Xiu Xiu	Plays the Music of Twin Peaks	Experimental rock, dark ambient	Polyvinyl	
April 18	Up10tion	Spotlight	K-pop	TOP Media	
April 20	The Fall of Troy	OK	Mathcore, post-hardcore, progressive rock	The Fall of Troy	
April 22	The 69 Eyes	Universal Monsters	Gothic rock	Nuclear Blast	
April 22	ASAP Ferg	Always Strive and Prosper	Hip-hop	ASAP Worldwide, Polo Grounds Music, RCA	
April 22	Bankroll Mafia	Bankroll Mafia	Hip-hop	Grand Hustle, EMPIRE	
April 22	Blue October	Home	Alternative rock	Up/Down Records	
April 22	Dälek	Asphalt for Eden	Experimental hip-hop, industrial hip-hop, shoegaze	Profound Lore	
April 22	Katy B	Honey	EDM, dubstep, electronica	Rinse, Virgin EMI	
April 22	NF	Therapy Session	Hip-hop, Christian hip-hop	Capitol CMG	
April 22	Wire	Nocturnal Koreans	Post-punk, art punk, alternative rock	Pinkflag	
April 23	Beyoncé	Lemonade	R&B	Parkwood, Columbia	
April 25	Twice	Page Two	K-pop, dance	JYP	
April 29	Aesop Rock	The Impossible Kid	Hip-hop	Rhymesayers	
April 29	Brian Eno	The Ship	Ambient	Warp	
April 29	The Boxer Rebellion	Ocean by Ocean	Indie rock	Amplify Music	
April 29	Discharge	End of Days	Hardcore punk	Nuclear Blast	
April 29	Drake	Views	Hip-hop, dancehall, R&B	OVO Sound, Cash Money, Young Money	
April 29	Fallujah	Dreamless	Technical death metal, progressive metal	Nuclear Blast	
April 29	King Gizzard & the Lizard Wizard	Nonagon Infinity	Psychedelic rock, garage rock, heavy metal	ATO, Flightless	
April 29	Martina Stoessel	Tini	Pop	Hollywood	
April 29	Rob Zombie	The Electric Warlock Acid Witch Satanic Orgy Celebration Dispenser	Industrial metal	Zodiac Swan Records, T-Boy Records, Universal	
April 29	Sixx:A.M.	Prayers for the Damned: Vol. 1	Hard rock	Eleven Seven	
April 29	Travis	Everything at Once	Post-Britpop, alternative rock, indie rock	Red Telephone Box	
April 29	Zucchero	Black Cat	Blues rock	Universal	

=== May ===
List of albums released in May 2016
Go to: January | February | March | April | May | June | July | August | September | October | November | December | Back to top
Release date	Artist	Album	Genre	Label	Ref.
May 2	BTS	The Most Beautiful Moment in Life: Young Forever	Hip-hop, dance-pop, R&B	Big Hit Entertainment	
May 6	Anohni	Hopelessness	Electronic, experimental, synth-pop	Secretly Canadian, Rough Trade	
May 6	Beverly	The Blue Swell		Kanine Records	
May 6	Carla Bley, Andy Sheppard, and Steve Swallow	Andando el Tiempo	Jazz	ECM	
May 6	Cuong Vu Trio meets Pat Metheny	Cuong Vu Trio Meets Pat Metheny	Jazz	Nonesuch	
May 6	Cyndi Lauper	Detour	Country, country rock, country blues	Sire	
May 6	Death Grips	Bottomless Pit	Experimental hip-hop, digital hardcore	Third Worlds	
May 6	Homeboy Sandman	Kindness for Weakness	Hip-hop	Stones Throw	
May 6	Jack DeJohnette, Ravi Coltrane and Matthew Garrison	In Movement	Jazz	ECM	
May 6	James Blake	The Colour in Anything	Electronic pop, R&B, soul	Polydor, 1–800 Dinosaur	
May 6	Jean-Michel Jarre	Electronica 2: The Heart of Noise	Electronic music	Sony Music	
May 6	Julianna Barwick	Will	Ambient, experimental	Dead Oceans	
May 6	Kate Ceberano	Anthology	Pop, soul, jazz	ABC Music	
May 6	Kaytranada	99.9%	Electronic	XL, HW&W	
May 6	Keith Urban	Ripcord	Pop, country pop	Hit Red, Capitol Nashville	
May 6	Little Scream	Cult Following		Merge, Dine Alone	
May 6	Meghan Trainor	Thank You	Dance-pop, R&B	Epic, Sony Music	
May 6	Mike Posner	At Night, Alone.	Pop	Island	
May 6	Pat Metheny	The Unity Sessions	Jazz	Nonesuch	
May 6	Rittz	Top of the Line	Hip-hop	Strange Music	
May 6	Tim Garland	One	Jazz	Edition	
May 6	Vektor	Terminal Redux	Thrash metal	Earache	
May 6	White Lung	Paradise	Punk rock	Domino	
May 6	Yoni Wolf and Serengeti	Testarossa	Hip-hop, indie pop	Joyful Noise	
May 8	Radiohead	A Moon Shaped Pool	Art rock, electronic	XL	
May 13	3OH!3	Night Sports	Pop, trap, hip-hop	Fueled by Ramen, Atlantic, Photo Finish	
May 13	Astronautalis	Cut the Body Loose	Hip-hop	SideOneDummy	
May 13	Chance the Rapper	Coloring Book	Hip-hop, gospel rap		
May 13	Corinne Bailey Rae	The Heart Speaks in Whispers	R&B	Virgin	
May 13	DevilDriver	Trust No One	Groove metal	Napalm	
May 13	Digitalism	Mirage	Electro house	Magnetism Recording Co, PIAS	
May 13	Hatebreed	The Concrete Confessional	Metalcore	Nuclear Blast	
May 13	Jessy Lanza	Oh No	Electronic, R&B, pop	Hyperdub	
May 13	Kvelertak	Nattesferd	Heavy metal	Roadrunner	
May 13	Kygo	Cloud Nine	Tropical house	Sony Music, Ultra Music, B1	
May 13	Modern Baseball	Holy Ghost	Indie rock, pop-punk	Run for Cover	
May 13	Nothing	Tired of Tomorrow	Shoegaze, dream pop	Relapse	
May 13	Pierce the Veil	Misadventures	Post-hardcore	Fearless	
May 20	Against the Current	In Our Bones		Fueled by Ramen, Warner Chappell	
May 20	Ana Popović	Trilogy	Blues rock, soul, jazz	ArtisteXclusive records	
May 20	Andy Shauf	The Party		Anti-	
May 20	Ariana Grande	Dangerous Woman	Pop, R&B	Republic	
May 20	Bent Knee	Say So	Art rock, progressive rock, baroque pop	Cuneiform	
May 20	Blake Shelton	If I'm Honest	Country	Warner Bros. Nashville	
May 20	Bob Dylan	Fallen Angels	Traditional pop	Columbia	
May 20	Boys Noize	Mayday	Electronic	Boysnoize Records	
May 20	Car Seat Headrest	Teens of Denial	Indie rock	Matador	
May 20	Eric Clapton	I Still Do	Blues, blues rock, folk	Bushbranch/Surfdog	
May 20	Highasakite	Camp Echo	Indie rock	Propeller	
May 20	Katatonia	The Fall of Hearts	Progressive rock	Peaceville	
May 20	Kent	Då som nu för alltid	Alternative rock, pop rock	RCA, Sony Music	
May 20	Lali	Soy	Pop, R&B	Sony Music Argentina	
May 20	Lonely the Brave	Things Will Matter	Alternative rock	Hassle, RCA	
May 20	Marissa Nadler	Strangers		Sacred Bones	
May 20	Mudcrutch	2	Southern rock, country rock	Reprise	
May 20	Pantha du Prince	The Triad	Electronic		
May 20	Richard Ashcroft	These People	Alternative rock	Cooking Vinyl	
May 20	Saosin	Along the Shadow	Post-hardcore, alternative rock	Epitaph	
May 20	Yuna	Chapters	Pop, R&B	Verve	
May 27	ABC	The Lexicon of Love II	Pop	Virgin EMI	
May 27	Architects	All Our Gods Have Abandoned Us	Metalcore	Epitaph, UNFD, New Damage	
May 27	Band of Skulls	By Default	Blues rock, dance-rock	BMG	
May 27	Beth Orton	Kidsticks	Electronic	Anti-	
May 27	Big Thief	Masterpiece	Indie rock, folk rock, Americana	Saddle Creek	
May 27	Catfish and the Bottlemen	The Ride	Alternative rock, indie rock	Capitol	
May 27	Clare Maguire	Stranger Things Have Happened	Indie pop, jazz, blues	Virgin	
May 27	Death Angel	The Evil Divide	Thrash metal	Nuclear Blast	
May 27	Dierks Bentley	Black	Country	Capitol Nashville	
May 27	Fifth Harmony	7/27	Pop, R&B, tropical house	Epic, Syco	
May 27	Flume	Skin	Electronic	Future Classic	
May 27	Gold Panda	Good Luck and Do Your Best	Electronic	City Slang	
May 27	Holy Fuck	Congrats		Innovative Leisure	
May 27	Lacuna Coil	Delirium	Gothic metal, alternative metal	Century Media	
May 27	The Monkees	Good Times!	Rock, power pop	Rhino	
May 27	PUP	The Dream Is Over	Punk rock	SideOneDummy, Royal Mountain	
May 27	Real Friends	The Home Inside My Head	Pop-punk	Fearless	
May 27	Robert Glasper & Miles Davis	Everything's Beautiful	Jazz	Blue Note, Columbia, Legacy	
May 27	Thrice	To Be Everywhere Is to Be Nowhere	Post-hardcore	Vagrant	

=== June ===
List of albums released in June 2016
Go to: January | February | March | April | May | June | July | August | September | October | November | December | Back to top
Release date	Artist	Album	Genre	Label	Ref.
June 3	Beartooth	Aggressive	Metalcore, hardcore punk	Red Bull, UNFD	
June 3	Cat's Eyes	Treasure House	Alternative rock	Kobalt Label Services	
June 3	Classixx	Faraway Reach	Electronic	Innovative Leisure	
June 3	The Claypool Lennon Delirium	Monolith of Phobos	Psychedelic rock, art rock, experimental rock	ATO	
June 3	Craig Morgan	A Whole Lot More to Me	Country	Black River	
June 3	Dan + Shay	Obsessed	Country	Warner Bros. Nashville	
June 3	Dark Funeral	Where Shadows Forever Reign	Black metal	Century Media	
June 3	Fantastic Negrito	The Last Days of Oakland	Blues rock	Blackball Universe	
June 3	Hellyeah	Undeniable	Heavy metal, groove metal	Eleven Seven	
June 3	Jimmy Barnes	Soul Searchin'	Rock, soul	Liberation Music	
June 3	The Kills	Ash & Ice	Indie rock	Domino	
June 3	Ladyhawke	Wild Things	Indie electronic, alternative dance, synth-pop	Polyvinyl	
June 3	The Lonely Island	Popstar: Never Stop Never Stopping	Comedy hip-hop	Republic	
June 3	Maren Morris	Hero	Country, pop	Columbia Nashville	
June 3	Melvins	Basses Loaded	Sludge metal, stoner rock	Ipecac	
June 3	Netsky	3	Drum & bass, dance-pop, electropop	Sony Music, Hospital, Epic	
June 3	Paul Simon	Stranger to Stranger	Folk rock, worldbeat	Concord	
June 3	Psychic Ills	Inner Journey Out		Sacred Bones	
June 3	Roxette	Good Karma	Pop	Parlophone	
June 3	The Strokes	Future Present Past		Cult	
June 3	Tegan and Sara	Love You to Death	Synth-pop	Vapor, Warner Bros.	
June 3	Volbeat	Seal the Deal & Let's Boogie	Heavy metal, groove metal, rockabilly	Republic, Universal	
June 3	Whitney	Light Upon the Lake	Americana, country soul, indie pop	Secretly Canadian	
June 3	Yanni	The Dream Concert: Live from the Great Pyramids of Egypt	Contemporary instrumental	Portrait, Sony Masterworks	
June 8	Dave Douglas	Dark Territory	Jazz	Greenleaf Music	
June 9	Wye Oak	Tween	Indie rock, indie folk	Merge, City Slang	
June 10	Band of Horses	Why Are You OK	Indie rock, Southern rock	Interscope	
June 10	Brandy Clark	Big Day in a Small Town	Country	Warner Bros.	
June 10	Fitz and the Tantrums	Fitz and the Tantrums	Indie pop, neo soul	Elektra	
June 10	Garbage	Strange Little Birds	Alternative rock, electronic rock, industrial rock	Stunvolume	
June 10	Jon Bellion	The Human Condition	Hip-hop, PBR&B, pop rock	Visionary, Capitol	
June 10	Kaleo	A/B	Blues rock, garage rock	Elektra	
June 10	letlive.	If I'm the Devil...	Post-hardcore, progressive rock, jazz fusion	Epitaph	
June 10	Nick Jonas	Last Year Was Complicated	Pop, R&B	Island, Safehouse	
June 10	Peter Bjorn and John	Breakin' Point	Indie pop, indie rock	Ingrid	
June 10	Rick Astley	50	Pop	BMG	
June 10	Rival Sons	Hollow Bones	Blues rock, hard rock	Earache	
June 10	Saliva	Love, Lies & Therapy		Universal	
June 10	Sumac	What One Becomes	Post-metal, sludge metal	Thrill Jockey	
June 10	The Temper Trap	Thick as Thieves	Indie rock	Liberation, Glassnote, Infectious	
June 10	Tom Odell	Wrong Crowd	Indie pop, indie electronic	RCA	
June 13	G.L.O.S.S.	Trans Day of Revenge	Hardcore punk, D-beat	Total Negativity Records, Nervous Nelly Records, Sabatoge Records	
June 14	YG	Still Brazy	West Coast hip-hop, gangsta rap, G-funk	4Hunnid, CTE, Def Jam	
June 15	Disclosure	Moog for Love	Electronic	Island, PMR	
June 17	case/lang/veirs	case/lang/veirs	Folk rock		
June 17	The Game	Streets of Compton	West Coast hip-hop, gangsta rap	eOne	
June 17	Gojira	Magma	Technical death metal, progressive metal, groove metal	Roadrunner	
June 17	Jake Bugg	On My One	Indie rock	Virgin EMI, Island	
June 17	Jon Pardi	California Sunrise	Country	Capitol Nashville	
June 17	Laura Mvula	The Dreaming Room	Soul, R&B	RCA, Columbia	
June 17	Let's Eat Grandma	I, Gemini	Pop	Transgressive	
June 17	Mitski	Puberty 2	Indie rock	Dead Oceans	
June 17	Mumford & Sons	Johannesburg		Island	
June 17	Neil Young & Promise of the Real	Earth	Rock	Reprise	
June 17	Red Hot Chili Peppers	The Getaway	Funk rock, alternative rock, pop rock	Warner Bros.	
June 17	Reik	Des/Amor	Latin pop	Sony Music Latin	
June 17	Swans	The Glowing Man	Experimental music	Young God, Mute	
June 17	Thousand Foot Krutch	Exhale	Christian rock, hard rock	TFK Music, The Fuel Music	
June 17	The Tragically Hip	Man Machine Poem	Rock	Universal Music Canada	
June 17	Wale	Summer on Sunset	Hip-hop	Every Blue Moon, Maybach Music	
June 17	Will Butler	Friday Night	Indie rock	Merge	
June 22	Delorean	Muzik		PHLEX	
June 24	Alice Bag	Alice Bag	Punk rock, rock	Don Giovanni	
June 24	Broods	Conscious	Electropop, synth-pop, dance	Island, Capitol, Universal Music Australia	
June 24	Cash Cash	Blood, Sweat & 3 Years	Electro house, progressive house	Big Beat, Atlantic	
June 24	Deerhoof	The Magic		Polyvinyl	
June 24	Dorothy	Rockisdead	Rock	Roc Nation	
June 24	DJ Shadow	The Mountain Will Fall	Hip-hop, instrumental hip-hop, electronic	Mass Appeal	
June 24	Drowners	On Desire	Indie rock	Frenchkiss	
June 24	Fred Frith Trio	Another Day in Fucking Paradise	Experimental, free improvisation	Intakt	
June 24	Jay Chou	Jay Chou's Bedtime Stories	Mandopop	Sony Music Taiwan	
June 24	Kayo Dot	Plastic House on Base of Sky	Avant-rock, electronic rock, progressive rock	The Flenser	
June 24	Marisa Anderson	Into the Light	American folk, Americana	Chaos Kitchen Music	
June 24	Mikey Erg	Tentative Decisions	Punk rock	Don Giovanni	
June 24	Nice As Fuck	Nice As Fuck	Punk, funk, pop	Love's Way Records	
June 24	Steve Vai	Modern Primitive		Epic	
June 24	Whitechapel	Mark of the Blade	Deathcore, groove metal	Metal Blade	
June 27	Marsheaux	Ath.Lon	Synth-pop, electronica	Undo	
June 28	Blood Orange	Freetown Sound	R&B, funk, jazz	Domino	
June 28	Taeyeon	Why	EDM, pop, R&B	SM	

== Third quarter ==
=== July ===
List of albums released in July 2016
Go to: January | February | March | April | May | June | July | August | September | October | November | December | Back to top
Release date	Artist	Album	Genre	Label	Ref.
July 1	American Authors	What We Live For	Indie rock, alternative rock	Island	
July 1	Area 11	Modern Synthesis	Alternative rock	Cooking Vinyl	
July 1	The Avalanches	Wildflower	Plunderphonics, electronic, neo-psychedelia	Astralwerks, Modular, EMI	
July 1	Bat for Lashes	The Bride	Baroque pop, rock	Parlophone	
July 1	Blink-182	California	Pop-punk, alternative rock	BMG	
July 1	Delta Goodrem	Wings of the Wild	Pop	Sony Music Australia	
July 1	Diesel	Americana	Rock	Liberation	
July 1	Fates Warning	Theories of Flight	Progressive metal	Inside Out	
July 1	Grace	FMA	hip-hop soul	RCA	
July 1	Magic!	Primary Colours	Pop, reggae fusion, reggae	Latium, RCA, Sony Music	
July 1	Maxwell	blackSUMMERS'night	Soul, neo soul	Columbia	
July 1	Metronomy	Summer 08	Indie electronic	Because Music	
July 1	Sara Watkins	Young in All the Wrong Ways	Americana, country	New West	
July 1	Silent Planet	Everything Was Sound	Metalcore, post-hardcore, post-metal	Solid State	
July 1	Snoop Dogg	Coolaid	West Coast hip-hop	Doggystyle, eOne Music	
July 5	Lindsey Abudei	...and the Bass Is Queen	Neo soul, blues, jazz	Stealth	
July 8	Aphex Twin	Cheetah	Techno, IDM, acid techno	Warp	
July 8	BadBadNotGood	IV		Innovative Leisure	
July 8	Biffy Clyro	Ellipsis	Alternative rock, electronic rock	14th Floor	
July 8	Boys Night Out	Black Dogs	Post-hardcore, alternative rock, rock	Good Fight	
July 8	Chevelle	The North Corridor	Alternative metal, hard rock, post-grunge	Epic	
July 8	Damien Done	Stay Black	Post-punk, gothic rock	Demons Run Amok	
July 8	Emarosa	131	Alternative rock	Hopeless	
July 8	Heart	Beautiful Broken	Hard rock, folk rock	Concord Bicycle Music	
July 8	The Julie Ruin	Hit Reset	Garage rock	Hardly Art	
July 8	Nonpoint	The Poison Red	Alternative metal	Spinefarm	
July 8	Róisín Murphy	Take Her Up to Monto	Electropop, art pop	PIAS	
July 8	Schoolboy Q	Blank Face LP	West Coast hip-hop, hip-hop, gangsta rap	Top Dawg, Interscope	
July 8	Show Me the Body	Body War			
July 8	Shura	Nothing's Real	Electropop	Polydor	
July 8	Switchfoot	Where the Light Shines Through	Alternative rock, pop rock	Vanguard	
July 8	Tanzwut	Schreib es mit Blut		AFM	
July 8	Vanna	All Hell	Hardcore punk	Pure Noise	
July 10	Shawn Colvin and Steve Earle	Colvin & Earle	Americana, folk	Fantasy	
July 11	GFriend	LOL	K-pop	Source Music	
July 12	Snail Mail	Habit	Indie rock, shoegaze	Sister Polygon	
July 15	Benny Benassi	Danceaholic	Progressive house	Ultra	
July 15	Cane Hill	Smile	Nu metal	Rise	
July 15	David Nail	Fighter	Country	MCA Nashville	
July 15	Dirty Heads	Dirty Heads	Reggae rock	Five Seven	
July 15	Good Charlotte	Youth Authority	Pop punk	MDDN	
July 15	Kel Valhaal	New Introductory Lectures on the System of Transcendental Qabala	Electronic, experimental music	YLYLCYN	
July 15	Michael Kiwanuka	Love & Hate	Indie rock, folk rock	Polydor	
July 15	Needtobreathe	Hard Love		Atlantic	
July 15	Steven Tyler	We're All Somebody from Somewhere	Country rock	Dot	
July 17	Logic	Bobby Tarantino	Hip-hop	Visionary, Def Jam	
July 17	Sarah Jarosz	Undercurrent	Folk, Americana	Sugar Hill	
July 18	F.T. Island	Where's the Truth?	Rock	FNC	
July 22	Crown the Empire	Retrograde		Rise	
July 22	Despised Icon	Beast	Deathcore	Nuclear Blast	
July 22	Gucci Mane	Everybody Looking	Hip-hop, trap	1017, Atlantic	
July 22	Lil Durk	Lil Durk 2X	Drill, trap	Only the Family, Def Jam	
July 22	Periphery	Periphery III: Select Difficulty	Progressive metal, djent	Sumerian, Century Media, Roadrunner	
July 22	Karmakanic	DOT		Inside Out	
July 22	Relient K	Air for Free	Pop rock, alternative rock	Mono vs Stereo	
July 29	Anarbor	Anarbor	Alternative rock, pop rock		
July 29	Billy Talent	Afraid of Heights	Alternative rock, punk rock, post-hardcore	Warner Music Canada, The End	
July 29	The Bouncing Souls	Simplicity	Punk rock	Rise, Chunksaah	
July 29	Descendents	Hypercaffium Spazzinate	Punk rock	Epitaph	
July 29	DJ Khaled	Major Key	Hip-hop, trap, R&B	Epic, We the Best	
July 29	Fantasia	The Definition Of...	R&B	19, RCA	
July 29	Jake Owen	American Love	Country	RCA Nashville	
July 29	Jinjer	King of Everything	Metalcore, post-metal	Napalm	
July 29	Nao	For All We Know	Alternative R&B	RCA, Little Tokyo Recordings	
July 29	Sinsaenum	Echoes of the Tortured	Blackened death metal	earMUSIC	
July 29	Thank You Scientist	Stranger Heads Prevail	Progressive rock	Evil Ink Records	
July 29	Viola Beach	Viola Beach	Indie rock, indie pop	Fuller Beans Records	
July 29	Zhu	Generationwhy	Electronic	Mind of a Genius, Columbia	

=== August ===
List of albums released in August 2016
Go to: January | February | March | April | May | June | July | August | September | October | November | December | Back to top
Release date	Artist	Album	Genre	Label	Ref.
August 5	Blossoms	Blossoms	Indie rock, indie pop	Virgin EMI	
August 5	Dinosaur Jr.	Give a Glimpse of What Yer Not	Alternative rock, indie rock	Jagjaguwar	
August 5	DJ Snake	Encore	EDM, trap	Interscope	
August 5	Dog Party	Til You're Mine		Asian Man	
August 5	Elvis Presley	Way Down in the Jungle Room		RCA, Legacy	
August 5	Giggs	Landlord	British hip-hop	SN1 Records	
August 5	Russian Circles	Guidance	Instrumental rock, post-metal, post-rock	Sargent House	
August 5	Skillet	Unleashed	Christian metal, hard rock	Atlantic	
August 5	Tarja	The Shadow Self	Symphonic metal	earMUSIC	
August 5	Wild Beasts	Boy King	Synth-pop	Domino	
August 9	Nels Cline	Lovers	Jazz	Blue Note	
August 12	The Amity Affliction	This Could Be Heartbreak	Metalcore, post-hardcore	UNFD, Roadrunner	
August 12	Atmosphere	Fishing Blues	Hip-hop	Rhymesayers	
August 12	Justin Moore	Kinda Don't Care	Country	Valory Music	
August 12	of Montreal	Innocence Reaches	Electronic, synth-pop, psychedelic	Polyvinyl	
August 12	PartyNextDoor	PartyNextDoor 3		OVO	
August 12	The Pineapple Thief	Your Wilderness		Kscope	
August 12	Rae Sremmurd	SremmLife 2	Hip-hop	Ear Drummer, Interscope	
August 12	Rome	The Hyperion Machine	Neofolk	Trisol	
August 12	Young the Giant	Home of the Strange	Indie rock, alternative rock	Fueled by Ramen	
August 18	AJJ	The Bible 2	Folk punk	SideOneDummy	
August 19	The Color Morale	Desolate Divine	Post-hardcore, hard rock, emo	Fearless	
August 19	Courtney Marie Andrews	Honest Life	Americana, indie folk	Mama Bird Recording Co.	
August 19	Crystal Castles	Amnesty (I)	Electropunk, witch house	Fiction, Casablanca	
August 19	Dolly Parton	Pure & Simple	Country	Dolly Records, RCA Nashville	
August 19	Ed Harcourt	Furnaces		Polydor	
August 19	Frank Ocean	Endless	Ambient pop, R&B	Def Jam	
August 19	Gonjasufi	Callus		Warp	
August 19	John Williamson	His Favourite Collection	Country	Warner Music Australasia	
August 19	Lindsey Stirling	Brave Enough	EDM, classical crossover, electro house	Lindseystomp	
August 19	Lisa Hannigan	At Swim	Folk, indie	Hoop Recordings, PIAS	
August 19	Lydia Loveless	Real	Alternative country, Americana	Bloodshot	
August 19	Myrkur	Mausoleum		Relapse	
August 19	Ryley Walker	Golden Sings That Have Been Sung	Psychedelic folk, folk rock	Dead Oceans	
August 19	Sabaton	The Last Stand	Power metal	Nuclear Blast	
August 19	Scott Walker	The Childhood of a Leader	Classical	4AD	
August 19	Soilwork	Death Resonance	Melodic death metal	Nuclear Blast	
August 19	Tobacco	Sweatbox Dynasty		Ghostly International	
August 19	Tory Lanez	I Told You	PBR&B, hip-hop, dancehall	Mad Love, Interscope	
August 19	Trapt	DNA	Hard rock, alternative metal, post-grunge	The End	
August 20	Frank Ocean	Blonde	R&B	Def Jam, Boys Don't Cry	
August 23	Will Wood and the Tapeworms	Self-ish	Dark cabaret, punk jazz		
August 24	Radwimps	Your Name	Rock		
August 26	The Album Leaf	Between Waves		Relapse	
August 26	The Bad Plus	It's Hard	Jazz	Okeh	
August 26	Barbra Streisand	Encore: Movie Partners Sing Broadway	Traditional pop	Columbia	
August 26	Britney Spears	Glory	Pop	RCA	
August 26	Carly Rae Jepsen	Emotion: Side B	Pop	604, School Boy, Interscope	
August 26	Cass McCombs	Mangy Love	Indie rock, soft rock	Anti-	
August 26	Celine Dion	Encore un soir	Pop	Columbia	
August 26	De La Soul	and the Anonymous Nobody...	Hip-hop	A.O.I. Records	
August 26	Florida Georgia Line	Dig Your Roots	Country	Big Machine	
August 26	Glass Animals	How to Be a Human Being	Indie pop, art pop, alternative R&B	Wolf Tone, Caroline International, Harvest	
August 26	Ingrid Michaelson	It Doesn't Have to Make Sense		Cabin 24 Records, Mom + Pop	
August 26	Marius Neset	Snowmelt	Jazz	ACT Music	
August 26	Motion Graphics	Motion Graphics	Ambient	Domino	
August 26	Omar Rodríguez-López	Arañas en la Sombra	Experimental rock, progressive rock, psychedelic rock	Ipecac	
August 26	Sodom	Decision Day	Thrash metal	SPV/Steamhammer	
August 26	Trygve Seim	Rumi Songs	Jazz	ECM	
August 26	Vince Staples	Prima Donna	Alternative hip-hop	ARTium, Def Jam	
August 26	Young Thug	Jeffery	Trap, psychedelic rap	300, Atlantic	

=== September ===
List of albums released in September 2016
Go to: January | February | March | April | May | June | July | August | September | October | November | December | Back to top
Release date	Artist	Album	Genre	Label	Ref.
September 2	Angel Olsen	My Woman	Indie rock	Jagjaguwar	
September 2	Big Scary	Animal	Pop rock	Pieater	
September 2	A Day to Remember	Bad Vibrations	Metalcore, pop-punk	ADTR, Epitaph	
September 2	The Divine Comedy	Foreverland	Orchestral pop	Divine Comedy	
September 2	Eluvium	False Readings On		Temporary Residence	
September 2	La Femme	Mystère	Psychedelic pop, psychedelic rock	Born Bad Records	
September 2	Freddie Mercury	Messenger of the Gods: The Singles	Rock, pop rock, opera	Mercury, Hollywood, Universal Music	
September 2	Isaiah Rashad	The Sun's Tirade	Hip-hop	Top Dawg	
September 2	James Vincent McMorrow	We Move	Alternative R&B	Faction Records, Believe Recordings, Mahogany Books	
September 2	King Creosote	Astronaut Meets Appleman		Domino	
September 2	Sophie Ellis-Bextor	Familia	Indie pop, folk, disco	EBGB's, Red Essential	
September 2	Tigran Hamasyan, Arve Henriksen, Eivind Aarset, and Jan Bang	Atmosphères	Ambient music, jazz, chamber music	ECM	
September 2	Travis Scott	Birds in the Trap Sing McKnight	Hip-hop	Grand Hustle, Epic	
September 2	The Warlocks	Songs from the Pale Eclipse	Psychedelic rock	Cleopatra	
September 2	Zomby	Ultra	Electronic	Hyperdub	
September 9	Bastille	Wild World	Indie rock	Virgin EMI, Virgin, Universal Music Group	
September 9	Clipping	Splendor & Misery	Experimental hip-hop	Sub Pop	
September 9	The Dear Hunter	Act V: Hymns with the Devil in Confessional	Progressive rock, indie rock	Equal Vision	
September 9	Devin Townsend Project	Transcendence	Progressive metal, symphonic metal	HevyDevy Records	
September 9	Fudge	Lady Parts	Hip-hop	Lex	
September 9	Gavin DeGraw	Something Worth Saving	Pop	RCA	
September 9	Grouplove	Big Mess	Alternative rock, indie rock	Canvasback, Atlantic	
September 9	The Head and the Heart	Signs of Light	Indie folk, indie pop, indie rock	Warner Bros.	
September 9	Jack White	Acoustic Recordings 1998–2016	Acoustic, blues	Third Man, Columbia	
September 9	Jason Aldean	They Don't Know	Country, country rock	Broken Bow, Macon Music	
September 9	Jennifer Rostock	Genau in diesem Ton	Rock, punk, pop rock	Four Music	
September 9	Joshua Redman and Brad Mehldau	Nearness	Jazz	Nonesuch	
September 9	KT Tunstall	Kin	Pop rock, indie rock	Caroline, Sony/ATV Music	
September 9	Leagues	Alone Together		Bufalotone Records	
September 9	Local Natives	Sunlit Youth	Indie rock	Loma Vista, Infectious	
September 9	Macy Gray	Stripped	Soul, R&B, jazz	Chesky	
September 9	Meat Loaf	Braver Than We Are	Rock	Caroline International S&D, 429	
September 9	M.I.A.	AIM	Hip-hop	Interscope, Polydor	
September 9	Nick Cave and the Bad Seeds	Skeleton Tree	Alternative rock, electronica, ambient	Bad Seed Ltd.	
September 9	Norma Jean	Polar Similar	Metalcore, post-hardcore	Solid State	
September 9	Of Mice & Men	Cold World	Nu metal, alternative metal, post-hardcore	Rise	
September 9	Okkervil River	Away	Indie rock	ATO	
September 9	Pansy Division	Quite Contrary	Queercore	Alternative Tentacles	
September 9	Safia	Internal	Electronic, indie pop	Parlophone, Warner Music Australasia	
September 9	St. Paul and The Broken Bones	Sea of Noise		Records	
September 9	Scott Tixier	Cosmic Adventure	Jazz	Sunnyside	
September 9	Teenage Fanclub	Here	Alternative rock	PeMa, Merge	
September 9	Twin Atlantic	GLA	Alternative rock	Red Bull	
September 9	Wilco	Schmilco	Folk rock	dBpm	
September 16	Aaron Lewis	Sinner	Country	Dot, Big Machine	
September 16	Against Me!	Shape Shift with Me	Punk rock	Total Treble Music	
September 16	AJR	What Everyone's Thinking		AJR Productions	
September 16	AlunaGeorge	I Remember		Island	
September 16	Amanda Shires	My Piece of Land	Country, Americana	BMG	
September 16	Beware of Darkness	Are You Real?	Alternative rock	Bright Antenna	
September 16	The Black Sorrows	Faithful Satellite	Blues, rock, soul	Head Records	
September 16	Bobby Rush	Porcupine Meat	Blues	Rounder	
September 16	Deap Vally	Femejism	Garage rock, alternative rock	Nevado Music	
September 16	Die Antwoord	Mount Ninji and da Nice Time Kid	Alternative hip-hop, rave		
September 16	Dinosaur	Together, As One	Jazz	Edition	
September 16	Gong	Rejoice! I'm Dead!	Progressive rock	Madfish	
September 16	The Halluci Nation	We Are the Halluci Nation	Electronic, hip-hop	Radicalized Records	
September 16	Iron Fire	Among the Dead	Power metal, progressive metal, speed metal	Crime	
September 16	Jóhann Jóhannsson	Orphée	Modern classical	Deutsche Grammophon	
September 16	King 810	La Petite Mort or a Conversation with God	Nu metal, metalcore	Roadrunner	
September 16	Kool Keith	Feature Magnetic	Hip-hop	MMG	
September 16	Lordi	Monstereophonic (Theaterror vs. Demonarchy)	Hard rock, heavy metal, shock rock	AFM	
September 16	Mac Miller	The Divine Feminine	Alternative hip-hop, jazz rap	REMember Music, Warner Bros.	
September 16	Madeleine Peyroux	Secular Hymns	Vocal jazz	Impulse!	
September 16	Moor Mother	Fetish Bones	Experimental	Don Giovanni	
September 16	Mykki Blanco	Mykki	Hip-hop	Dogfood Music Group, !K7	
September 16	Robert Glasper	ArtScience	Alternative R&B, jazz-funk	Blue Note	
September 16	The Shondes	Brighton			
September 16	Taking Back Sunday	Tidal Wave	Alternative rock, hard rock	Hopeless	
September 16	Touché Amoré	Stage Four	Post-hardcore, screamo, melodic hardcore	Epitaph	
September 16	Usher	Hard II Love	R&B	RCA	
September 16	Willie Nelson	For the Good Times: A Tribute to Ray Price	Country	Legacy	
September 16	Young Guns	Echoes	Alternative rock	Windup	
September 21	Feeder	All Bright Electric	Alternative rock, post-grunge, art rock	Cooking Vinyl	
September 22	The Caretaker	Everywhere at the End of Time - Stage 1		History Always Favours The Winners	
September 23	Airbourne	Breakin' Outta Hell	Hard rock	Spinefarm	
September 23	Andrew Cyrille	The Declaration of Musical Independence	Jazz	ECM	
September 23	Beach Slang	A Loud Bash of Teenage Feelings	Punk rock	Polyvinyl, Big Scary Monsters	
September 23	Billy Bragg & Joe Henry	Shine a Light: Field Recordings from the Great American Railroad	Folk	Cooking Vinyl	
September 23	Crowder	American Prodigal	CCM, worship	Sparrow, sixsteps, Capitol CMG	
September 23	Devendra Banhart	Ape in Pink Marble	Indie folk, indie, Alternative rock	Nonesuch	
September 23	Every Time I Die	Low Teens	Metalcore, hardcore punk, Southern rock	Epitaph	
September 23	Hamilton Leithauser + Rostam	I Had a Dream That You Were Mine	Indie rock	Glassnote	
September 23	How to Dress Well	Care	Art pop	Domino, Weird World	
September 23	Idina Menzel	Idina	Pop	Warner Bros.	
September 23	John Scofield	Country for Old Men	Jazz	Impulse!	
September 23	Marillion	Fuck Everyone and Run (F E A R)	Neo-prog	earMUSIC	
September 23	The Mekons	Existentialism		Bloodshot	
September 23	Neurosis	Fires Within Fires	Post-metal, experimental metal, doom metal	Neurot	
September 23	Rachael Yamagata	Tightrope Walker		Frankenfish, Thirty Tigers	
September 23	Shawn Mendes	Illuminate	Pop	Island, Universal	
September 23	Skylar Grey	Natural Causes	Alternative pop	KidinaKorner, Interscope	
September 23	Tash Sultana	Notion		Lonely Lands Records	
September 23	Vangelis	Rosetta	Electronic, ambient, classical	Decca	
September 23	Various artists	Trolls: Original Motion Picture Soundtrack		RCA	
September 23	Warpaint	Heads Up	Indie rock	Rough Trade	
September 23	Yves Tumor	Serpent Music	Sound collage, experimental, noise	PAN	
September 27	Danny Brown	Atrocity Exhibition	Experimental hip-hop	Warp	
September 29	Lori McKenna	The Bird and the Rifle	Country	CN Records	
September 30	The Agonist	Five	Melodic death metal, metalcore	Napalm	
September 30	Alcest	Kodama	Blackgaze, post-black metal	Prophecy Productions	
September 30	Andrew Cyrille and Bill McHenry	Proximity	Jazz	Sunnyside	
September 30	Banks	The Altar	Alternative R&B	Harvest	
September 30	Bob Weir	Blue Mountain	Rock, folk, country	Legacy, Columbia	
September 30	Bon Iver	22, A Million	Indie folk, folktronica	Jagjaguwar	
September 30	Craig David	Following My Intuition	UK Garage, dance, tropical house	Sony Music, Insanity	
September 30	Drive-By Truckers	American Band	Country rock, alternative rock, alternative country	ATO	
September 30	Epica	The Holographic Principle	Symphonic metal	Nuclear Blast	
September 30	Eric Clapton	Live in San Diego		Reprise	
September 30	Gruff Rhys	Set Fire to the Stars	Jazz, lounge pop, rock 'n' roll	Twisted Nerve	
September 30	Jenny Hval	Blood Bitch	Experimental pop	Sacred Bones	
September 30	John Prine	For Better, or Worse	Country	Oh Boy	
September 30	Mr. Oizo	All Wet	Electronic music, techno	Ed Banger	
September 30	Opeth	Sorceress	Progressive rock	Nuclear Blast, Moderbolaget	
September 30	Pixies	Head Carrier	Alternative rock, indie rock, pop rock	Pixiesmusic, PIAS	
September 30	Regina Spektor	Remember Us to Life	Pop, Alternative rock	Warner Bros., Sire	
September 30	Slaves	Take Control	Punk rock	Virgin EMI	
September 30	Solange	A Seat at the Table	Neo soul, R&B	Saint, Columbia	
September 30	Suicidal Tendencies	World Gone Mad	Crossover thrash	Suicidal Records	
September 30	Tycho	Epoch	Ambient, electronic, post-rock	Ghostly International	
September 30	Van Morrison	Keep Me Singing	Rock	Caroline	
September 30	William Michael Morgan	Vinyl	Country	Warner Bros. Nashville	
September 30	Winterfylleth	The Dark Hereafter	Black metal	Candlelight	
September 30	The Wytches	All Your Happy Life	Garage punk, alternative rock, indie rock	Heavenly	
September 30	Yello	Toy	Electronic dance music	Universal	
September 30	Yellowcard	Yellowcard	Alternative rock, pop-punk	Hopeless	

== Fourth quarter ==
=== October ===
List of albums released in October 2016
Go to: January | February | March | April | May | June | July | August | September | October | November | December | Back to top
Release date	Artist	Album	Genre	Label	Ref.
October 4	C Duncan	The Midnight Sun	Baroque pop, dream pop	FatCat	
October 5	Shinee	1 of 1	K-pop	SM, KT Music	
October 7	Alter Bridge	The Last Hero	Alternative metal, hard rock, heavy metal	Caroline, Napalm	
October 7	Balance and Composure	Light We Made		Vagrant, Big Scary Monsters	
October 7	Barry Gibb	In the Now	Rock, country	Columbia	
October 7	Colbie Caillat	The Malibu Sessions	Pop	PlummyLou Records	
October 7	Dance Gavin Dance	Mothership	Post-hardcore, experimental rock	Rise	
October 7	Daya	Sit Still, Look Pretty	Electropop, dance-pop, synth-pop	Z Entertainment, Artbeatz, RED Distribution	
October 7	The Devil Wears Prada	Transit Blues	Metalcore	Rise	
October 7	Fit for a King	Deathgrip	Metalcore	Solid State	
October 7	Goat	Requiem	Alternative rock, psychedelic	Sub Pop, Rocket Recordings	
October 7	Green Day	Revolution Radio	Punk rock, pop-punk, alternative rock	Reprise	
October 7	Joyce Manor	Cody	Emo, pop-punk, indie rock	Epitaph	
October 7	Kae Tempest	Let Them Eat Chaos		Fiction, Lex	
October 7	Kaiser Chiefs	Stay Together	Pop rock	Fiction	
October 7	Lizzo	Coconut Oil	R&B	Atlantic	
October 7	Loretta Lynn	White Christmas Blue	Country	Legacy	
October 7	Melissa Etheridge	MEmphis Rock and Soul	Rock, soul	Stax	
October 7	Meshuggah	The Violent Sleep of Reason	Extreme metal, progressive metal, avant-garde metal	Nuclear Blast	
October 7	Mo Pitney	Behind This Guitar	Country	Curb	
October 7	NOFX	First Ditch Effort	Punk rock	Fat Wreck Chords	
October 7	Norah Jones	Day Breaks	Jazz, pop rock	Blue Note	
October 7	Olivia Newton-John, Beth Nielsen Chapman and Amy Sky	Liv On		Sony Music Australia	
October 7	OneRepublic	Oh My My	Pop, pop rock	Mosley, Interscope	
October 7	Phantogram	Three		Republic	
October 7	Phish	Big Boat	Rock	JEMP	
October 7	Placebo	Life's What You Make It	Alternative rock		
October 7	Sonata Arctica	The Ninth Hour	Symphonic metal, power metal	Nuclear Blast	
October 7	Sum 41	13 Voices	Alternative metal, alternative rock, punk rock	Hopeless	
October 7	White Lies	Friends	Indie rock	BMG	
October 10	BTS	Wings	Hip-hop, EDM, R&B	Big Hit	
October 14	Beth Hart	Fire on the Floor	Blues rock	Provogue	
October 14	Black Marble	It's Immaterial	Synth-pop, coldwave	Ghostly International	
October 14	Charlie Haden Liberation Music Orchestra	Time/Life	Jazz	Impulse!	
October 14	Chris Young	It Must Be Christmas	Country, Christmas	RCA Nashville	
October 14	Conor Oberst	Ruminations		Nonesuch	
October 14	Crying	Beyond the Fleeting Gales		Run for Cover	
October 14	Darkthrone	Arctic Thunder	Black metal	Peaceville	
October 14	Dave Holland	Aziza	Jazz	Dare2 Records	
October 14	David Bromberg Band	The Blues, the Whole Blues, and Nothing But the Blues	Blues	Red House	
October 14	The Dillinger Escape Plan	Dissociation	Mathcore, progressive metal	Party Smasher, Cooking Vinyl	
October 14	The Game	1992	West Coast hip-hop, gangsta rap	Blood Money Entertainment, eOne	
October 14	Hillsong Worship	Let There Be Light	Worship	Hillsong, Sparrow, Capitol	
October 14	Jeff Rosenstock	Worry	Punk rock, indie rock	SideOneDummy	
October 14	Jessica Mauboy	The Secret Daughter: Songs from the Original TV Series	Pop	Sony Music Australia	
October 14	JoJo	Mad Love	R&B	Atlantic	
October 14	Katie Melua	In Winter		BMG	
October 14	Kings of Leon	Walls	Rock	RCA	
October 14	The Lemon Twigs	Do Hollywood	Pop, progressive rock	4AD	
October 14	Lisa Mitchell	Warriors	Pop	Warner Music Australia	
October 14	L'Orange and Mr. Lif	The Life & Death of Scenery	Hip-hop	Mello Music	
October 14	Moby and the Void Pacific Choir	These Systems Are Failing	Punk rock, post-punk, new wave	Little Idiot, Mute	
October 14	The Naked and Famous	Simple Forms		Somewhat Damaged, Kobalt Label Services	
October 14	The Orb	COW / Chill Out, World!	Electronica, dub, IDM	Kompakt	
October 14	Rebecca Ferguson	Superwoman		Syco, Sony Music	
October 14	Sabrina Carpenter	Evolution	Electropop	Hollywood	
October 14	Sleaford Mods	T.C.R.	New wave, post-punk	Rough Trade	
October 14	Swet Shop Boys	Cashmere	Hip-hop	Customs	
October 14	Tom Chaplin	The Wave	Pop	Island	
October 14	Two Door Cinema Club	Gameshow	Indie rock	Parlophone	
October 14	Wadada Leo Smith	America's National Parks	Jazz	Cuneiform	
October 21	Agnes Obel	Citizen of Glass	Folk, classical, indie pop	PIAS	
October 21	Amaranthe	Maximalism	Metalcore, power metal	Spinefarm	
October 21	American Football	American Football	Rock	Polyvinyl	
October 21	Amy Grant	Tennessee Christmas	Christmas, Contemporary Christian	Capitol, Sparrow	
October 21	Cakes da Killa	Hedonism		Ruffians, Thirty Tigers	
October 21	David Crosby	Lighthouse	Folk	GroundUP Music	
October 21	The Dean Ween Group	The Deaner Album	Alternative rock	ATO	
October 21	DRAM	Big Baby DRAM	Hip-hop	Atlantic, Empire	
October 21	Elvis Presley	The Wonder of You	Orchestral pop	RCA, Legacy	
October 21	Far East Movement	Identity	EDM, pop	Transparent Agency, Spinnin', eOne	
October 21	Hooton Tennis Club	Big Box of Chocolates			
October 21	I Prevail	Lifelines	Post-hardcore, metalcore, alternative rock	Fearless	
October 21	Jacuzzi Boys	Ping Pong			
October 21	Jimmy Eat World	Integrity Blues	Alternative rock	RCA	
October 21	Joan As Police Woman and Benjamin Lazar Davis	Let It Be You	Rock, pop, R&B	Reveal	
October 21	Joe Budden	Rage & The Machine	Hip-hop	Mood Muzik Entertainment, Empire	
October 21	John K. Samson	Winter Wheat	Folk, indie rock	Anti-	
October 21	Kevin Devine	Instigator		Procrastinate! Music Traitors	
October 21	Kero Kero Bonito	Bonito Generation	Electropop	Double Denim, Sony Music Japan	
October 21	Korn	The Serenity of Suffering	Nu metal	Roadrunner	
October 21	Lady Gaga	Joanne	Soft rock, dance-pop	Interscope	
October 21	Leonard Cohen	You Want It Darker	Folk rock	Columbia	
October 21	Melanie C	Version of Me	Pop	Red Girl, RCA	
October 21	Michael Bublé	Nobody but Me		Reprise	
October 21	NxWorries	Yes Lawd!		Stones Throw	
October 21	Pentatonix	A Pentatonix Christmas	A cappella, Christmas	RCA	
October 21	Planes Mistaken for Stars	Prey	Heavy metal, hardcore punk, post-hardcore	Deathwish	
October 21	The Pretenders	Alone	Rock	BMG	
October 21	The Pretty Reckless	Who You Selling For	Rock	Razor & Tie	
October 21	R. Kelly	12 Nights of Christmas	R&B, soul	RCA	
October 21	The Radio Dept.	Running Out of Love	Dream pop, indie pop, electronic	Labrador	
October 21	Rascal Flatts	The Greatest Gift of All	Country, Christmas	Big Machine	
October 21	Saint Motel	saintmotelevision	Indie pop	Elektra, On The Records, Parlophone	
October 21	Sarah McLachlan	Wonderland	Christmas	Verve	
October 21	Tanya Tagaq	Retribution	Inuit throat singing	Six Shooter	
October 24	Twice	Twicecoaster: Lane 1	K-pop, dance	JYP	
October 26	Arashi	Are You Happy?	Pop, R&B	J Storm	
October 27	Saba	Bucket List Project	Hip-hop	Saba Pivot, LLC	
October 28	Avenged Sevenfold	The Stage	Thrash metal, progressive metal	Capitol	
October 28	Black M	Éternel insatisfait	French hip-hop, French pop	Wati B, Sony Music, Jive	
October 28	Blue Rodeo	1000 Arms	Country rock	Warner Music Canada	
October 28	Brett Eldredge	Glow	Country, Christmas	Atlantic Nashville	
October 28	Courteeners	Mapping the Rendezvous	Indie rock	Ignition Records	
October 28	CRX	New Skin	Hard rock, stoner rock, industrial rock	Columbia	
October 28	Dope	Blood Money Part 1	Industrial metal, metalcore, alternative metal	eOne	
October 28	Empire of the Sun	Two Vines		Virgin EMI	
October 28	Helmet	Dead to the World	Alternative metal	earMUSIC	
October 28	The Hidden Cameras	Home On Native Land	Folk, country	Outside	
October 28	James Arthur	Back from the Edge	Pop	Columbia	
October 28	Jeezy	Trap or Die 3	Hip-hop	Def Jam, CTE World	
October 28	Jennifer Nettles	To Celebrate Christmas	Country, Christmas	Big Machine	
October 28	Kacey Musgraves	A Very Kacey Christmas	Country, Christmas	Mercury Nashville	
October 28	Kenny Chesney	Cosmic Hallelujah	Country	Blue Chair, Columbia Nashville	
October 28	LeAnn Rimes	Remnants	Country, rock, country pop	Sony Music	
October 28	Madness	Can't Touch Us Now	Ska, pop, reggae	Lucky 7	
October 28	Mannequin Pussy	Romantic	Punk rock	Tiny Engines	
October 28	Memphis May Fire	This Light I Hold	Metalcore, post-hardcore, hard rock	Rise	
October 28	She & Him	Christmas Party	Indie pop, Christmas	Columbia	
October 28	Testament	Brotherhood of the Snake	Thrash metal	Nuclear Blast	
October 28	Tkay Maidza	Tkay	Synth-pop, hip-hop	Downtown, Interscope	
October 28	Tony Molina	Confront the Truth	Power pop	Slumberland	
October 28	Tove Lo	Lady Wood	Electropop, synth-pop, dance-pop	Island	

=== November ===
List of albums released in November 2016
Go to: January | February | March | April | May | June | July | August | September | October | November | December | Back to top
Release date	Artist	Album	Genre	Label	Ref.
November 4	Alicia Keys	Here	R&B, soul	RCA	
November 4	B.o.B.	Elements	Conscious hip-hop, political hip-hop	Label No Genre	
November 4	Bon Jovi	This House Is Not for Sale	Arena rock, pop rock	Island	
November 4	The Chainsmokers	Collage		Disruptor, Columbia	
November 4	Client Liaison	Diplomatic Immunity	Electropop, indie pop, new wave	Dot Dash Recordings, Remote Control, Inertia	
November 4	Common	Black America Again	Hip-hop	ARTium, Def Jam	
November 4	Hope Sandoval & the Warm Inventions	Until the Hunter	Alternative rock	Tendril Tales	
November 4	Jaws	Simplicity	Post-punk		
November 4	Jim James	Eternally Even	Indie rock, psychedelic rock, alternative rock	ATO, Capitol	
November 4	Keke Palmer	Lauren	R&B	Island	
November 4	Kungs	Layers	Deep house, tropical house	House of Barclay	
November 4	Lambchop	FLOTUS	Indietronica, electronica	Merge, City Slang	
November 4	Laura Pausini	Laura Xmas	Christmas music, jazz, swing	Warner	
November 4	Marcus & Martinus	Together	Pop	Sony Music Entertainment Norway	
November 4	Queen	On Air	Rock, hard rock	Virgin EMI, Hollywood	
November 4	Robbie Williams	The Heavy Entertainment Show	Pop	Columbia	
November 4	Shirley Collins	Lodestar	Folk	Domino	
November 4	Susan Boyle	A Wonderful World	Operatic pop, crossover, easy listening	Syco, Columbia, Sony Music	
November 4	Tinashe	Nightride	Alternative R&B	RCA	
November 4	Waterparks	Double Dare	Pop-punk	Equal Vision	
November 4	Yussef Kamaal	Black Focus	Jazz-funk, broken beat	Brownswood	
November 5	French Montana	MC4	Hip-hop	Bad Boy, Maybach Music Group, Epic	
November 8	Deathspell Omega	The Synarchy of Molten Bones	Black metal	Norma Evangelium Diaboli, The Ajna Offensive, Season of Mist	
November 8	Wakrat	Wakrat	Alternative rock	Earache	
November 9	Alexandros	Exist!	Alternative rock, pop-punk, experimental rock	Universal Japan, RX-Records	
November 9	Bad Gyal	Slow Wine Mixtape		Bad Gyal	
November 11	Bob Dylan	The 1966 Live Recordings	Folk	Columbia	
November 11	Cliff Richard	Just... Fabulous Rock 'n' Roll	Rock and roll	Sony Music	
November 11	David Bowie	Legacy (The Very Best of David Bowie)	Rock	Sony Music	
November 11	Emeli Sandé	Long Live the Angels	R&B, soul	Virgin	
November 11	Enigma	The Fall of a Rebel Angel	New-age, pop, electronica	Baloo Music S.A.	
November 11	Garth Brooks and Trisha Yearwood	Christmas Together	Christmas, country	Pearl, Gwendolyn	
November 11	In Flames	Battles	Alternative metal	Eleven Seven, Nuclear Blast	
November 11	John Farnham and Olivia Newton-John	Friends for Christmas	Pop, Christmas	Sony Music Australia	
November 11	Lorenzo Senni	Persona	Hard trance, intelligent dance music	Warp	
November 11	Mina & Celentano	Le migliori	Pop	Clan, PDU	
November 11	Nathan Sykes	Unfinished Business	Pop, R&B, EDM	Global Entertainment	
November 11	Olly Murs	24 Hrs	Pop	Epic	
November 11	Ronnie Dunn	Tattooed Heart	Country	Nash Icon	
November 11	Simple Minds	Acoustic	Acoustic	Caroline International	
November 11	Sirenia	Dim Days of Dolor	Gothic metal, symphonic metal, doom metal	Napalm	
November 11	Sleigh Bells	Jessica Rabbit	Indie pop	Torn Clean	
November 11	Sting	57th & 9th	Pop rock	Cherrytree, Interscope, A&M	
November 11	A Tribe Called Quest	We Got It from Here... Thank You 4 Your Service	East Coast hip-hop, jazz rap	Epic	
November 11	You Blew It!	Abendrot	Indie rock	Triple Crown	
November 18	6lack	Free 6lack	Hip-hop, R&B	LoveRenaissance, Interscope	
November 18	Bic Runga	Close Your Eyes		Sony Music New Zealand	
November 18	Bridgit Mendler	Nemesis	Soul, indie, R&B	Black Box	
November 18	Bruno Mars	24K Magic	Funk	Atlantic	
November 18	DNCE	DNCE	Pop	Republic	
November 18	Dragonette	Royal Blues			
November 18	E-40	The D-Boy Diary: Book 1	Hip-hop	Heavy on the Grind Entertainment	
November 18	E-40	The D-Boy Diary: Book 2	Hip-hop	Heavy on the Grind Entertainment	
November 18	High Valley	Dear Life	Country	Atlantic, Warner Nashville	
November 18	Highly Suspect	The Boy Who Died Wolf	Alternative rock	300 Entertainment	
November 18	Ion Dissonance	Cast the First Stone	Deathcore, mathcore	Good Fight	
November 18	Justice	Woman	Disco, funk	Because, Ed Banger	
November 18	Kerser	Tradition		Warner Australia	
November 18	Kevin Abstract	American Boyfriend: A Suburban Love Story	Indie pop, alternative hip-hop, alternative R&B	Brockhampton Records	
November 18	Little Mix	Glory Days	Dance-pop, R&B	Syco, Columbia	
November 18	Metallica	Hardwired... to Self-Destruct	Thrash metal	Blackened Recordings	
November 18	Miranda Lambert	The Weight of These Wings	Country	RCA Nashville	
November 18	Pink Martini	Je dis oui!		Heinz Records	
November 18	Sixx:A.M.	Prayers for the Blessed	Alternative metal, hard rock	Eleven Seven	
November 18	Thee Oh Sees	An Odd Entrances	Garage rock, psychedelic rock	Castle Face	
November 21	Up10tion	Burst	K-pop	TOP Media	
November 22	Prince	4Ever	Pop, rock, funk	NPG, Warner Bros.	
November 23	Lil Uzi Vert and Gucci Mane	1017 vs. The World	Hip-hop, trap	Generation Now, GUWOP	
November 25	Flume	Skin Companion EP 1			
November 25	Garth Brooks	Gunslinger	Country	Pearl	
November 25	Kate Bush	Before the Dawn	Progressive pop, art pop, art rock	Concord, Fish People	
November 25	Kylie Minogue	Kylie Christmas: Snow Queen Edition	Christmas, traditional pop	Parlophone, Warner Bros.	
November 25	Rumer	This Girl's in Love: A Bacharach and David Songbook	Pop	East West, Warner Bros.	
November 25	The Weeknd	Starboy	Alternative R&B	XO, Republic	
November 28	Burial	Young Death / Nightmarket	Ambient house, downtempo, future garage	Hyperdub	
November 29	Dr. Dog	Abandoned Mansion	Indie rock, blues rock, neo-psychedelia	Anti-	

=== December ===
List of albums released in December 2016
Go to: January | February | March | April | May | June | July | August | September | October | November | December | Back to top
Release date	Artist	Album	Genre	Label	Ref.
December 2	Animotion	Raise Your Expectations		Invisible Hands Music	
December 2	Childish Gambino	"Awaken, My Love!"	R&B, soul, funk	Glassnote	
December 2	deadmau5	W:/2016Album/	Electronic dance music	mau5trap	
December 2	Grace VanderWaal	Perfectly Imperfect	Pop	Columbia	
December 2	Jean-Michel Jarre	Oxygène 3	Electronic	Sony Music, Columbia	
December 2	John Legend	Darkness and Light	R&B	Columbia, GOOD	
December 2	Nails / Full of Hell	Nails / Full of Hell	Grindcore	Closed Casket Activities	
December 2	The Narrative	Golden Silence	Indie rock, synth-pop		
December 2	Pete Doherty	Hamburg Demonstrations	Indie rock	Cloud Hill	
December 2	The Rolling Stones	Blue & Lonesome	Blues rock	Polydor	
December 2	Tiziano Ferro	Il mestiere della vita	Pop	Universal	
December 2	Various artists	The Hamilton Mixtape	Hip-hop, R&B, pop	Atlantic	
December 9	Ab-Soul	Do What Thou Wilt.	Hip-hop	Top Dawg	
December 9	Hodgy	Fireplace: TheNotTheOtherSide	Hip-hop	Odd Future, Columbia	
December 9	J. Cole	4 Your Eyez Only	Conscious hip-hop	Dreamville, Roc Nation	
December 9	LP	Lost on You	Indie rock	Vagrant	
December 9	Maria Taylor	In the Next Life	Indie folk	Flower Moon Records	
December 9	Neil Young	Peace Trail	Rock	Reprise	
December 9	Post Malone	Stoney	Country, R&B	Republic	
December 9	Tech N9ne	The Storm	Hip-hop	Strange	
December 9	Various artists	Doing It In Lagos: Boogie, Pop & Disco in 1980s Nigeria	Pop, disco, afro-pop	Soundway	
December 12	Big Bang	Made	Dance-pop, R&B, hip-hop	YG	
December 15	Injury Reserve	Floss			
December 16	Gabrielle Aplin	Miss You		Never Fade	
December 16	Kid Cudi	Passion, Pain & Demon Slayin'	Hip-hop	Wicked Awesome, Republic	
December 16	Little Simz	Stillness in Wonderland	Hip-hop	Age 101 Music	
December 16	T.I.	Us or Else: Letter to the System	Political hip-hop	Grand Hustle, Roc Nation	
December 21	Dec 99th	December 99th			
December 22	Nine Inch Nails	Not the Actual Events	Industrial rock	The Null Corporation	
December 24	Run the Jewels	Run the Jewels 3	Hip-hop	RBC	
