= Weeping Choir =

Studio album by Full of Hell
- Released: May 17, 2019
- Recorded: December 2018
- Studio: GodCity Studio
- Genre: Grindcore; death metal; noise rock
- Length: 24:47
- Label: Relapse
- Producer: Kurt Ballou

Full of Hell chronology
Ascending a Mountain of Heavy Light (2017)	Weeping Choir (2019)	Garden of Burning Apparitions (2021)

Professional ratings
Aggregate scores
Source	Rating
Metacritic	84/100
Review scores
Source	Rating
Decibel	9/10
Exclaim!	10/10
Pitchfork	7.5/10

Weeping Choir is the seventh studio album (and fourth non-collaborative studio album) by the American grindcore band Full of Hell. The album was released on May 17, 2019 and serves as the band's debut release through Relapse Records. Weeping Choir was engineered by Kurt Ballou of Converge, who previously produced Full of Hell's 2017 studio album Trumpeting Ecstasy.

== Writing and recording ==
Since their last album, several of the members of Full of Hell have moved to different cities. Because of this, Weeping Choir became the first Full of Hell album to be written without all members of the band in a practice space. This time, guitarist and primary songwriter Spencer Hazard wrote full songs in his bedroom on his own and the band would get together to practice the new material about once or twice a month because of their new "adult" responsibilities. Hazard says this new approach to writing material resulted in some of their most complex and challenging songs ever created. He said: "This record definitely had parts where I wrote the riff and it sounded really cool, but once we got all together we were like, 'This is in some weird time signature I don't even know how to count it,' kind of thing. Even when we got in the studio, Kurt [Ballou] was like, 'I don’t know what time signature that is.'"

Weeping Choir marks the second Full of Hell album to be recorded and produced by Kurt Ballou, guitarist of the hardcore band Converge, who worked with Full of Hell on their prior album, Trumpeting Ecstasy. Full of Hell reported that Ballou pushed the band harder this time than before, but ultimately best captured the sound of their live performances out of all their albums to date. Hazard elaborated: "[On] Trumpeting he kind of let us do our own thing. But this time he was definitely like, 'No, do it again. You can do better.' I feel like he was able to get better takes out of us this time."

== Composition, sound and theme ==
For Weeping Choir, the members of Full of Hell drew inspiration from their entire discography. This included drawing elements of hardcore music from Roots of Earth Are Consuming My Home (2011), experimental grindcore elements from Rudiments of Mutilation (2013) and the death metal influences on Trumpeting Ecstasy (2017). The band also attributes their new ability to work in a studio and build a song around an electronic beat (giving "Angels Gather Here" as one example) to their experimental collaborative albums with The Body. Spencer Hazard says it was a conscious decision to recall different music styles from all their previous albums. Hazard elaborated: "With [Weeping Choir], I kinda wanted to reel it back and take aspects from every record we've ever done and try to combine it together. That's why there's longer songs, and more like hardcore parts, but still plenty of death metal riffs and straight-up grind and powerviolence stuff."

On Trumpeting Ecstasy, Full of Hell dialed back their noise and electronic influences because that album was book-ended by their collaborations with The Body and Merzbow. Vocalist Dylan Walker says they re-incorporated noise and electronics into Weeping Choir knowing they were absent on their previous album, and because they "wanted to make a well-rounded record again".

The album features several guest collaborations, including performances from members of Insect Warfare, Charles Bronson and Lingua Ignota. Walker says all the guests invited to appear on Weeping Choir are friends and artists they respect, and they were initially worried the album featured too many guests. Kristin Hayter, who performs under the name Lingua Ignota, appears on the album's longest track "Armory Of Obsidian Glass". Hayter said it "was a great pleasure to work on" the song, and that she, "wanted my vocals to provide a counterpoint to all the savagery, to pick up on and accentuate harmonic things happening in the music in an unexpected way. I think the effect overall is chilling, wild, and I'm excited for people to hear it."

Weeping Choir is also considered a companion or "sister" album to Trumpeting Ecstasy. The two are linked both with inverted album artwork—Trumpeting Ecstasy features a faceless figure with white fire rising to the right, Weeping Choir features a faceless figure with a black void of smoke rising to the left—and thematically related lyrics. While the lyrics were intentionally vague and open to interpretation, inspired by bands such as Thee Silver Mt. Zion Memorial Orchestra and Godspeed You! Black Emperor, Walker said the two albums are connected to events in his personal life. Walker said of the connection: "I guess all I can say is that Trumpeting was like a bubble being popped in my personal life, and kind of like a very moment-in-time record just based on what was going on in the Western world. Weeping Choir is kind of all that's left in the wake of that; it's definitely meant to be a more sombre record."

== Marketing and promotion ==
Full of Hell began promoting Weeping Choir with an online stream and music video directed by Cody Stauder for the opening track "Burning Myrrh" in March 2019. The following month in April 2019, the band released an online stream and Frank Huang-created video for "Silmaril"—a reference to the Silmaril jewels from J. R. R. Tolkien's legendarium. The final album track used to promote Weeping Choir prior to release was an online stream of "Armory of Obsidian Glass" in May 2019. Full of Hell also released a Justin Broadrick (Godflesh, Jesu) remix of the track "Thundering Hammers" through Decibel magazine's Flexi Series in their May 2019 issue.

The band's first tour in support of the album will be a May–June 2019 headlining North American tour with Primitive Man and Genocide Pact. Full of Hell will tour Europe with The Body in July 2019 and South America with Rotten Sound in September 2019.

== Track listing ==
No.	Title	Length
1.	"Burning Myrrh"	2:12
2.	"Haunted Arches"	1:07
3.	"Thundering Hammers"	1:54
4.	"Rainbow Coil"	3:08
5.	"Aria of Jeweled Tears"	1:28
6.	"Downward"	1:35
7.	"Armory of Obsidian Glass"	6:55
8.	"Silmaril"	1:14
9.	"Angels Gather Here"	2:40
10.	"Ygramul the Many"	1:31
11.	"Cellar of Doors"	1:03
Total length:		24:47

== Personnel ==
Full of Hell

- Dylan Walker – vocals, noise
- Spencer Hazard – guitar, noise
- Dave Bland – drums
- Sam DiGristine – bass, vocals, saxophone

Production and artwork

- Kurt Ballou – production, recording
- Ian Jacyszyn – recording
- Brad Boatright – mastering
- Mark McCoy – artwork and design

Guest musicians

- Kristin Hayter – vocals on "Armory of Obsidian Glass"
- Paulo Paguntalan – vocals on "Silmaril"
- Alex Hughes – vocals on "Burning Myrrh"
- Mark McCoy – vocals on "Downward"
- Limbs Bin – "Aria of Jeweled Tears"
- James Kelly – "Angels Gather Here"
