= Trumpeting Ecstasy =

Studio album by Full of Hell
- Released: May 5, 2017
- Studio: Godcity Studios
- Genre: Deathgrind, sludge metal, noise
- Length: 23:19
- Label: Profound Lore
- Producer: Kurt Ballou

Full of Hell chronology
Nails / Full of Hell (2016)	Trumpeting Ecstasy (2017)	Ascending a Mountain of Heavy Light (2017)

Trumpeting Ecstasy is the third studio album by the American grindcore band Full of Hell. The album was produced by Kurt Ballou (Converge) and was released on May 5, 2017 through Profound Lore Records.

== Background ==
Trumpeting Ecstasy is the band's first "solo" release in four years following back-to-back collaborative studio albums with Merzbow (Full of Hell & Merzbow) and The Body (One Day You Will Ache Like I Ache). Vocalist Dylan Walker says those collaborations had an impact on the creation of Trumpeting Ecstasy, elaborating: "We might not have been willing, or even able, to do some of the things that we were looking to do with the new record. Those guys gave us these nice extra toolsets — like the idea of improvisation or having extra instrumentation outside of the normal rock band style." Though the band hopes the lyrical themes will be interpreted by the listener however they choose, Walker said Trumpeting Ecstasy is about then-current events and also "kind of about man's small goods, like the small good actions being washed away by our species on a larger scale. If you looked at humanity on a long time line, I kind of feel like humanity got lost at its inception point."

Full of Hell also released the digital-only, four-track EP Trumpeting Ecstasy Remixes in May 2017. The EP notably includes a remix from Ben Chisholm, bassist for the gothic metal band Chelsea Wolfe.

== Critical reception ==
The album was met with generally positive reviews from music critics. Writing for Exclaim!, Denise Falzon gave the album a perfect 10/10, concluding her review by claiming, "Trumpeting Ecstasy is the culmination of Full of Hell really coming into their own, exuding the confidence that comes along with refining their stylistic approach and honing their sound into something that is completely theirs." Zoe Camp of Pitchfork gave the album a 7.7/10.0, stating, "Although Full of Hell spend the majority of Trumpeting Ecstasy examining their usual tricks through an expanded prism, their overall approach remains the same. They take a sweeping panorama of the abyss, compress it down to a single point, and shade it in until it breaks." Both reviewers gave praise for Nicole Dollanganger's pop-influenced guest vocals on the album's title track, "Trumpeting Ecstasy".

== Track listing ==
No.	Title	Length
1.	"Deluminate"	1:12
2.	"Branches of Yew"	0:50
3.	"Bound Sphinx"	1:24
4.	"The Cosmic Vein"	2:12
5.	"Digital Prison"	0:41
6.	"Crawling Back to God"	2:07
7.	"Fractured Quartz"	0:40
8.	"Gnawed Flesh"	2:51
9.	"Ashen Mesh"	1:44
10.	"Trumpeting Ecstasy"	3:15
11.	"At the Cauldron's Bottom"	6:23

== Personnel ==
Full of Hell

- Dylan Walker – vocals, noise
- Spencer Hazard – guitar, noise
- Dave Bland – drums
- Sam DiGristine – bass

Production and artwork

- Kurt Ballou – production
- Brad Boatright – mastering
- Mark McCoy – artwork and design

Guest vocals

- Aaron Turner on "Crawling Back to God"
- Andrew Nolan on "Ashen Mesh"
- Nicole Dollanganger on "Trumpeting Ecstasy"
- Nate Newton on "At The Cauldron's Bottom"
