= Coagulated Bliss =

Studio album by Full of Hell
- Released: April 26, 2024
- Genre: Grindcore
- Label: Closed Casket Activities
- Producer: Kevin Bernsten

Full of Hell chronology
When No Birds Sang (2023)	Coagulated Bliss (2024)	Scraping the Divine (2024)

Professional ratings
Review scores
Source	Rating
Distorted Sound	9/10
MetalSucks	4/5
Sputnikmusic	3.8/5

Coagulated Bliss is the eleventh studio album by American grindcore band Full of Hell. It was released on April 26, 2024, via Closed Casket Activities. Production was handled by Kevin Bernsten at Developing Nations in Baltimore. It features guest appearances from Ross Dolan and Jacob Bannon.

A music video for the song "Doors to Mental Agony" was directed by Eric Richter.

== Track listing ==
All lyrics are written by Dylan Walker.

No.	Title	Length
1.	"Half Life of Changelings"	1:11
2.	"Doors to Mental Agony"	1:36
3.	"Transmuting Chemical Burns"	1:37
4.	"Fractured Bonds to Mecca"	2:14
5.	"Coagulated Bliss"	1:21
6.	"Bleeding Horizon"	6:13
7.	"Vomiting Glass"	0:56
8.	"Schizoid Rupture"	1:51
9.	"Vacuous Dose"	1:40
10.	"Gasping Dust" (featuring Ross Dolan)	1:09
11.	"Gelding of Men"	1:53
12.	"Malformed Ligature" (featuring Jacob Bannon)	3:34

== Personnel ==
- Dylan Walker – lyrics, vocals, layout
- Samuel DiGristine – vocals, bass, saxophone
- David Bland – vocals, drums
- Spencer Hazard – guitar, electronics
- Ross Dolan – vocals (track 10)
- Jacob Bannon – vocals (track 12)
- Kevin Bernsten – producer
- Taylor Young – mixing
- Nick Townsend – mastering
- Brian Montuori – artwork
