= When No Birds Sang =

Studio album by Full of Hell and Nothing
- Released: December 1, 2023
- Genres: Sludge metal; doomgaze; shoegaze; dream pop; post-rock
- Length: 33:49
- Label: Closed Casket Activities
- Producer: Will Putney

Full of Hell chronology
Suffocating Hallucination (2023)	When No Birds Sang (2023)	Coagulated Bliss (2024)

Nothing chronology
The Great Dismal B-Sides (2021)	When No Birds Sang (2023)	a short history of decay (2026)

Singles from When No Birds Sang
- 1. "Spend the Grace" Released: October 11, 2023; 2. "Like Stars in the Firmament" Released: November 8, 2023

When No Birds Sang is a collaborative studio album by American grindcore band Full of Hell and shoegaze band Nothing. It was released on December 1, 2023, through Closed Casket Activities.

== Background ==
The bands have known each other since the 2010s and stayed in contact ever since. The connection was strengthened through sharing stages together and eventually led to the recording of a collaborative project. Production was handled by Fit for an Autopsy guitarist Will Putney. Domenic Palermo of Nothing shared that both bands "deal with the same genre-phobia" but will only come together to create "soul crushers". Full of Hell's Dylan Walker added that there is a common "identity" that allowed them to meet where "it's lush and beautiful, but also sad and ugly".

Thematically, When No Birds Sang is inspired by the September 11 attacks, in particular the subject of the photograph The Falling Man. While the man's identity has never been conclusively established, many believe he was a Windows on the World employee named Jonathan Briley, which led Nothing guitarist Domenic Palermo to discuss him during the album's writing process. Palermo stated the idea was to write "about a situational event", which led him to think of Briley and the possibility that he was the man in the photograph. The bands therefore wrote an album chronicling the final day of an ordinary man with ordinary hopes, dreams, and relationships who unexpectedly finds himself amid a nightmarish situation like the September 11 attacks, dealing with his feelings arising from that situation. The album's innocuous artwork was specifically chosen to contradict the expectations that normally arise from writing such a dark record; the cover is intended to offer a complete contrast to the album's content.

== Critical reception ==
Professional ratings
Review scores
Source	Rating
Kerrang!	4/5
Pitchfork	7.6/10

Olly Thomas of Kerrang! drew comparisons to the "spectral sound" of early Mogwai and My Bloody Valentine, as well as the "driving heaviness" of Swans. Thomas concluded that the album bears the "imprint of both bands" but sounds like "nothing from either back catalogue", citing the "overwhelming finale to an impressively varied team-up". Danielle Chelosky at Stereogum awarded the project the accolade "album of the week", saying that When No Birds Sang morphs "tragedy into devastating beauty". It transcends "mortality" and stares at it at the same time, creating "an endless fall into the unknown". Chelosky called it a clash "in the perfect middle". Reviewing the album for Pitchfork, Sadie Sartini Garner stated that it "highlights the depression that's always lurking within both bands' heaviness", calling it "the rare metal album whose greatest virtue is its delicacy".

== Track listing ==
All tracks are written by David Bland, Domenic Palermo, Doyle Martin, Dylan Walker, Samuel DiGristine and Spencer Hazard.

When No Birds Sang track listing
No.	Title	Length
1.	"Rose Tinted World"	8:11
2.	"Like Stars in the Firmament"	5:24
3.	"Forever Well"	4:07
4.	"Wild Blue"	4:32
5.	"When No Birds Sang"	5:48
6.	"Spend the Grace"	5:47
Total length:		33:49

== Personnel ==
- David Bland – composer, performer
- Doyle Martin – composer, performer
- Dylan Walker – composer, performer
- Samuel DiGristine – composer, performer
- Spencer Hazard – composer, performer
- Domenic Palermo – composer, performer, creative direction, additional production
- Jackson Green – art direction, design
- Will Putney – production, sound engineering, mixing, mastering
- Steve Seid – additional sound engineering
- Tommy Vasta – additional sound engineering
- Alex Oatman – additional tracking

== See also ==
- News at 11
- My Year of Rest and Relaxation
