= Garden of Burning Apparitions =

Studio album by Full of Hell
- Released: October 1, 2021
- Recorded: January 2021
- Studio: Machines With Magnets
- Genre: Deathgrind, noise rock
- Length: 20:54
- Label: Relapse
- Producer: Seth Manchester

Full of Hell chronology
Weeping Choir (2019)	Garden of Burning Apparitions (2021)	Suffocating Hallucination (2023)

Professional ratings
Aggregate scores
Source	Rating
Metacritic	82/100
Review scores
Source	Rating
Kerrang!	4/5
Metal Injection	8.5/10
Pitchfork	7.4/10

Garden of Burning Apparitions is the eighth studio album (and fifth non-collaborative studio album) by the American grindcore band Full of Hell. The album was released on October 1, 2021, and is the band's second release through Relapse Records.

== Track listing ==
No.	Title	Length
1.	"Guided Blight"	0:58
2.	"Asphyxiant Blessing"	1:56
3.	"Murmuring Foul Spring"	1:25
4.	"Derelict Satellite"	3:15
5.	"Burning Apparition"	1:33
6.	"Eroding Shell"	0:52
7.	"All Bells Ringing"	1:12
8.	"Urchin Thrones"	1:25
9.	"Industrial Messiah Complex"	1:27
10.	"Reeking Tunnels"	2:06
11.	"Non-Atomism"	1:06
12.	"Celestial Hierarch"	3:30
Total length:		20:54

== Personnel ==
Full of Hell

- Spencer Hazard – guitar, electronics
- Dylan Walker – vocals, electronics
- David Bland – percussion
- Sam DiGristine – bass, saxophone
- Ryan Bloomer – electronics on "Derelict Satellite"
- Shoshana Rosenberg – bass clarinet on "Murmuring Foul Spring"

Production and artwork

- Seth Manchester – production
- Adam Gonsalves – mastering
- Mark McCoy – artwork and design
