= Full of Hell / Code Orange Kids =

EP (split) by Full of Hell and Code Orange Kids
- Released: April 17, 2012
- Genre: Hardcore punk, grindcore, metalcore, post-hardcore
- Length: 11:58
- Label: Topshelf

Full of Hell chronology
Roots of Earth Are Consuming My Home (2011)	Full of Hell / Code Orange Kids (2012)	Rudiments of Mutilation (2013)

Code Orange Kids chronology
Cycles (2011)	Full of Hell / Code Orange Kids (2012)	Love Is Love/Return to Dust (2012)

Full of Hell / Code Orange Kids is a split EP between the American hardcore bands Full of Hell and Code Orange Kids. The album was released on April 17, 2012, through Topshelf Records. Both bands toured together later in 2012, and Code Orange Kids released a music video directed by Max Moore for the track "V (My Body Is a Well)" that featured live footage recorded from the band's performance at a Louisville, Kentucky house show mixed with shots of "anthropomorphic Evil Dead-like tree branches."

== Reception ==
The split received generally favorable views. Writing for Alternative Press, Kevin Stewart-Panko gave the album a three-and-a-half out of five stars and said Code Orange Kids' two songs, "'IV (My Mind Is a Prison)' and 'V (My Body Is a Well)' are expansive and spastic with a spirited, three-pronged vocal attack our disenfranchised inner-anarchist just loves, not to mention the Pg. 99 and Orchid influence they bring to the table. The downfall to Code Orange Kids' contribution is the tendency to meander. The songs' parts often seem cobbled together, with the result being that the musical flow suffers." Writing for AbsolutePunk, Adam Pfleider gave the album an 8.8 out of 10.0 and said about Code Orange Kids' side that they have, "already hearkened an intensity begotten of early Fear Before the March of Flames, but they move into The Always Open Mouth territory on 'IV (My Mind Is a Prison),' and it gives us a hopeful preview of their upcoming full-length with the band's best track to date. The four piece close out the b-side with 'V (My Body Is a Well),' memorable of why the band has made a name for themselves thus far." Writing for Exclaim!, Kiel Hume said that on Code Orange Kids' side, "The group's (marginally) more traditional hardcore sound ebbs and flows between breakdown-style riffs and fast sections; one moment it's punishing riffing and the next it's speedy, all-in screaming. With a variety of vocal styles working in this cacophony, Reba's (guitar) at once melodic and acidic vocals stand out."

On Full of Hell's songs, Stewart-Panko said, "Their half of this split ('Fox Womb' and 'Reeds In A River, Dry') is mired in miserable, pitch-black emotion conveyed by a thick and wiry guitar sound, dual-vocal contrasts and a reverbed-out production value that recalls basement show abrasion and early-'90s death metal." On Full of Hell's side, Pfleider said the band is, "a terrifying group of kids. The wall of guitars mixed with the "devil-escaping" opening vocals of 'Fox Womb' is an opening murder scene. The track moves from barking sludge to quick hitting hardcore and back to drowning before feeding into the hardcore exorcism of 'Reeds In a River, Dry.'" On Full of Hell's side, Hume wrote, "'Fox Womb' lurches to life in slow, steady chords until it suddenly unravels into maniacal screeching and growls before ending on a lucid, fading scream. Full of Hell's nature imagery and song titles suggest a war of all against all, a world of imminent extinction and human knowledge of this fact. This theme is continued in Full of Hell's second track, 'Reeds in a River, Dry.'"

== Track listing ==
=== Side A: Full of Hell ===
1. "Fox Womb" – 3:14
2. "Reeds in a River, Dry" – 2:12

=== Side B: Code Orange Kids ===
1. "IV (My Mind Is a Prison)" – 2:58
2. "V (My Body Is a Well)" – 3:34

== Personnel ==
Full Of Hell

- Dylan Walker – vocals, electronics
- Spencer Hazard – guitars
- Brandon Brown – bass, vocals
- Dave Bland – drums

Code Orange Kids

- Eric Balderose – guitars, vocals
- Joe Goldman – bass
- Reba Meyers – guitars, vocals
- Jami Morgan – drums, vocals

Production

- Kevin Bernstein – recording engineer
- Nick Steinborn – mastering engineer
- Kimi Hanauer – artwork
