= Roots of Earth Are Consuming My Home =

Studio album by Full of Hell
- Released: August 6, 2011
- Recorded: June 13–15, 2011
- Genre: Grindcore, powerviolence, noise, metalcore, sludge metal, crust punk
- Length: 28:34
- Label: A389 Recordings
- Producer: Kevin Bernsten

Full of Hell chronology
The Inevitable Fear of Existence (2010)	Roots of Earth Are Consuming My Home (2011)	Full of Hell / Code Orange Kids (2012)

Professional ratings
Review scores
Source	Rating
CVLT Nation	Positive
Exclaim!	Positive

Roots of Earth Are Consuming My Home is the debut studio album by American grindcore band Full of Hell. It was released in 2011 on A389 Records.

== Track listing ==
No.	Title	Length
1.	"Pile of Dead Horses"	1:59
2.	"Endless Drone"	2:45
3.	"The Bed is Burning"	2:49
4.	"Rat King"	2:34
5.	"The White Mare"	1:50
6.	"Dregs of Pluto"	2:52
7.	"Black Iron"	2:03
8.	"Roots of Earth Are Consuming My Home"	3:41
9.	"Pisces Legs"	1:47
10.	"The Oars Are Broken"	1:05
11.	"Affirmation of Nothing"	5:04

== Personnel ==
Full Of Hell

- Dylan Walker – vocals, electronics
- Spencer Hazard – guitars
- Brandon Brown – bass, vocals
- Dave Bland – drums

Production and additional musicians

- Kevin Bernstein – recording engineer
- Nick Steinborn – mastering engineer
- Max Davis – vocals (track 2)
- Jordan Skipper – vocals (tracks 6 and 7)
