= Amber Mote in the Black Vault =

- Original cover art. Closed Casket's reissue features the band's name in gold lettering.

EP by Full of Hell
- Released: January 8, 2016
- Recorded: July 2015
- Studio: Developing Nations
- Genre: Grindcore
- Length: 5:57
- Label: Bad Teeth
- Producer: Kevin Bernsten

Full of Hell chronology
Full of Hell & Merzbow (2014)	Amber Mote in the Black Vault (2016)	One Day You Will Ache Like I Ache (2016)

Amber Mote in the Black Vault is an EP by the American grindcore band Full of Hell. It was released on January 8, 2016 originally through Bad Teeth Recordings. The first pressing quickly went out of print and was re-issued through Closed Casket Activities a year later in February 2017. Full of Hell began promoting the EP with an online stream of the opening track "Halogen Bulb" in November 2015. Amber Mote in the Black Vault was released while Full of Hell was on tour with Tombs and 1349. The track "Amber Mote" includes an excerpt from Thomas Wolfe's 1940 novel, You Can't Go Home Again.

Amber Mote in the Black Vault is noted for Full of Hell's cover of sludge metal/grunge band Melvins' song "Oven", receiving a wide release on their 1989 second album, Ozma and a limited release as a single in 1987. Full of Hell had always been inspired by Melvins' ability to be a "totally unique and uncompromising band that has always worked their asses off" and that "with past covers that we've done, we've always deviated from the source material, but this time we chose to stick close to the original sound and tempo." Writing for Scene Point Blank, Zachary Watt gave the EP a 9/10 rating, stating: "Though it is fair to say the album is less an exercise in noise than most of the band's previous efforts. The final track is an unexpected treat: a faithful (albeit with the exception of Walker's vocal style) cover of the Melvins song 'Oven' from their 1989 release OZMA." Writing for Vice's music blog Noisey, Kim Kelly praised the band's cover, stating: "Full of Hell and the Melvins have a lot in common. They both revel in abrasion, pushing the limits of their own abilities as well as their audience's tolerance for noise, and harbor a certain endearingly trollish disposition. They're both firmly entrenched within their respective scenes, with the Melvins revered as elder statesmen and Full of Hell hailed as one of extreme music's most promising young acts, and, as it turns out, they perfectly complement one another's sounds—at least as far as we can tell from Full of Hell's grinding, pained cover of the Melvins' golden oldie 'Oven.'"

== Track listing ==
1. "Halogen Bulb" – 0:50
2. "Amber Mote" – 2:02
3. "Barb and Sap" – 1:33
4. "Oven" (originally written and recorded by Melvins) – 1:32
