= Primitive Man (band) =

American doom metal band

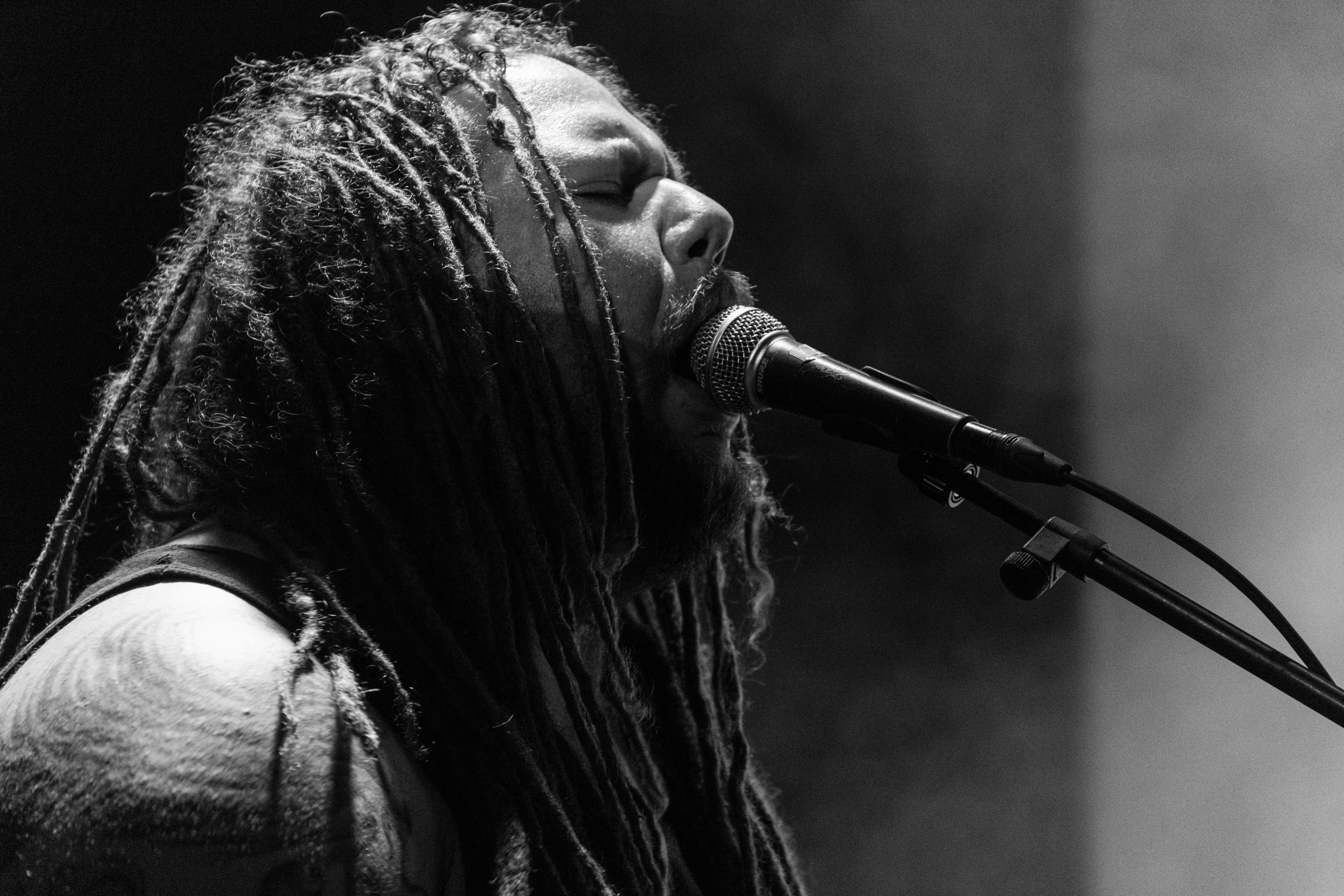
- Frontman Ethan Lee McCarthy at Roadburn Festival 2015

Background information
- Origin: Denver, Colorado, U.S.
- Genres: Sludge metal; noise; funeral doom metal; black-doom
- Years active: 2012–present
- Label: Relapse
- Members: Ethan Lee McCarthy; Jonathan Campos; Joe Linden
- Past members: Bennet Kennedy; Spy Soto
- Website: primitivemandoom.bandcamp.com

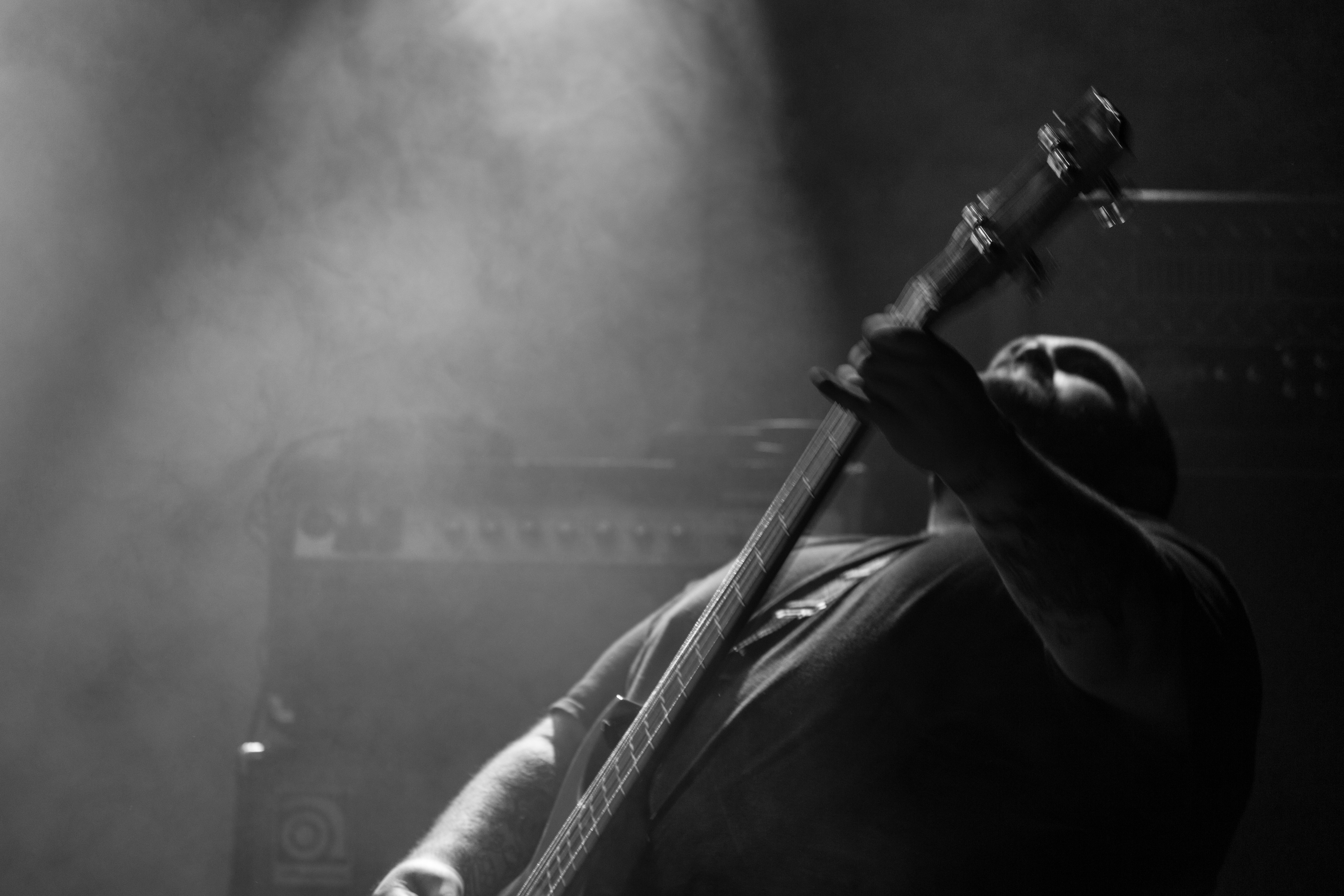
Bassist Jonathan Campos at Roadburn 2015

Primitive Man is an American doom metal band from Denver, Colorado, composed of Ethan Lee McCarthy on vocals and guitar, Jonathan Campos on bass, and Joe Linden (who has replaced founding member Bennet Kennedy) on drums. They are known for an extremely harsh sound – combining funeral doom, noise music, and black metal elements – and blunt nihilistic outlook. Their third studio album Immersion was released through Relapse Records in 2020.

== History ==
The band was formed in February 2012 by guitarist-vocalist Ethan Lee McCarthy, bassist Jonathan Campos and drummer Bennet Kennedy. In October 2012, the band recorded their debut album Scorn at Flatline Audio under the direction of Dave Otero (Cephalic Carnage, Cattle Decapitation, Cobalt, Catheter). The album was released in cooperation with the labels Throatruiner Records and Mordgrimm. After the release, Isidro "Spy" Soto joined the band as the temporary live and in session drummer. In February 2013, the band released a demo tape titled P//M, which contained eleven songs. In June 2013, the band signed a deal with Relapse Records, who reissued Scorn this summer. In July and August, the band embarked on their first US tour with Reproacher. Since then, the band has done many subsequent tours in the United States, Europe, Japan, Australia, New Zealand and Southeast Asia.

== Members ==
Current

- Ethan Lee McCarthy – guitars, vocals (2012-present)
- Jonathan Campos – bass (2012-present)
- Joe Linden – drums (2015-present)

Former

- Bennet Kennedy – drums (2012-2013)
- Spy Soto – drums (2013-2015)

== Discography ==
Studio albums

- Scorn (2013)
- Caustic (2017)
- Immersion (2020)
- Suffocating Hallucination (2023) (collaboration with Full of Hell)
- Observance (2025)

EPs

- Home Is Where the Hatred Is (2015)
- "Futility" + "Untitled" (2015)
- Insurmountable (2022)

Demos

- P//M (2013)
- Steel Casket (2018)

Splits

- With Xaphan (2014)
- With Hexis (2014)
- With Hessian (2014)
- With Fister (2014)
- With Northless (2016)
- With Sea Bastard (2016)
- With Unearthly Trance (2018)
- With Hell (2019)
