= Rudiments of Mutilation =

Studio album by Full of Hell
- Released: June 11, 2013
- Recorded: January 3–6, 2013
- Genre: Grindcore, powerviolence, sludge metal, noise
- Length: 24:09
- Label: A389 Recordings
- Producer: Kevin Bernsten

Full of Hell chronology
Full of Hell / Code Orange Kids (2012)	Rudiments of Mutilation (2013)	Full of Hell & Merzbow (2014)

Alternate cover
- 2017 vinyl repress.

Rudiments of Mutilation is the second studio album by American grindcore band Full of Hell. It was released on June 11, 2013 through A389 Records.

== Background ==
Prior to the album's release, Full of Hell released the track "Coven of the Larynx" online for streaming in March 2013. On the meaning behind the album's title, vocalist Dylan Walker said: "Rudiments of Mutilation refers to our innate and basic need to suffer and cause suffering. On this record I was able to draw equally from the first hand experience of pain in my own life and the ugliness that is the greater human pulse."

== Reception ==
Professional ratings
Review scores
Source	Rating
Exclaim!	9/10
Metal Injection	9.5/10 stars

The album was generally well received by music critics. Denise Falzon of Exclaim! gave the album a nine-out-of-ten rating and said: "Rudiments of Mutilation is a difficult and thought-provoking listen, proving once and for all that Full of Hell are not your run-of-the-mill hardcore band." Christopher Luedtke of Metal Injection gave the album a nine-and-a-half-out-of-ten rating and said: "It is sick, unnerving, excellently established moody, violent, and one of the best damn records that will be put out this year." John Consterdine of Terrorizer said the album is, "a relentless 24 minute ride, if you thought the new album from Nails was brutal, that's a walk in the park compared to this."

== Track listing ==
No.	Title	Length
1.	"Dichotomy"	2:10
2.	"Vessel Deserted"	2:11
3.	"Coven of the Larynx"	1:02
4.	"Throbbing Lung Fiber"	1:02
5.	"Indigence and Guilt"	1:51
6.	"Embrace"	3:37
7.	"The Lord Is My Light"	4:20
8.	"Bone Coral and Brine"	1:54
9.	"Rudiments of Mutilation"	2:06
10.	"In Contempt of Life"	3:56
