= Nails / Full of Hell =

EP (split) by Nails & Full of Hell
- Released: December 2, 2016
- Genre: Grindcore
- Length: 4:22
- Label: Closed Casket Activities

Nails chronology
You Will Never Be One of Us (2016)	Nails / Full of Hell (2016)	I Don't Want to Know You (2019)

Full of Hell chronology
One Day You Will Ache Like I Ache (2016)	Nails / Full of Hell (2016)	Trumpeting Ecstasy (2017)

Nails / Full of Hell is a split EP between American powerviolence bands Nails and Full of Hell. It was released on December 2, 2016, through the indie hardcore label Closed Casket Activities. Shortly after the release, Full of Hell announced all proceeds from the album on Bandcamp for the remainder of 2016 would be donated to The Trevor Project and Planned Parenthood.

After releasing their third studio album You Will Never Be One of Us in June 2016, Nails went on a short US headlining tour with Full of Hell. Full of Hell's vocalist Dylan Walker said the split EP came out a mutual respect for each other and that the music each band brings to the release represents where they were mentally at the time. Walker elaborated that, "The Nails song is an external war against anyone that holds you down and devalues you. The Full of Hell side is the inverse: an internal war against innate human violence in our genealogy and the struggle against complacent fear." At the time of the EP's announcement, it was a surprise to see new music from Nails because fans and music critics believed the band had quietly gone on hiatus and it was unclear of their contribution to the EP was new or archival material. Nails cancelled some European tour dates and one of those venues' statements to ticket holders was leaked online, which suggested the band had called it quits. Nails later denied the claims of hiatus, and booked new tour dates by the end of 2016.

Vince Bellino of Decibel said Nails' track "No Longer Under Your Control" speeds through with "nothing less than the unchecked rage the band have consistently delivered" and that Full of Hell's vocals "come through the storm of noise and grind like a piercing assault".

== Track listing ==
1. "No Longer Under Your Control" (Nails) – 1:31
2. "Thy Radiant Garrote Exposed" (Full of Hell) – 1:42
3. "Bez Bólu" (Full of Hell) – 1:09
