= One Day You Will Ache Like I Ache =

Studio album by the Body and Full of Hell
- Released: March 25, 2016
- Studio: Machines With Magnets studios (Providence, Rhode Island)
- Genre: Sludge metal, grindcore, noise, avant-garde metal
- Length: 31:41
- Label: Neurot

The Body chronology
No One Deserves Happiness (2016)	One Day You Will Ache Like I Ache (2016)	Ascending a Mountain of Heavy Light (2017)

Full of Hell chronology
Amber Mote in the Black Vault (2015)	One Day You Will Ache Like I Ache (2016)	Nails / Full of Hell (2016)

One Day You Will Ache Like I Ache is a collaborative studio album between American extreme metal bands the Body and Full of Hell. The album was released on March 25, 2016, though Neurot Recordings—a label founded by members of Neurosis and Tribes of Neurot. The title, One Day You Will Ache Like I Ache, is a nod to the lyrics of the 1994 Hole song, "Doll Parts". The album was also listed on Consequence of Sound's most anticipated 2016 metal releases.

== Background ==
Following the success of their 2014 collaborative album Full of Hell & Merzbow, Full of Hell began planning other collaboration projects for the future, including one with the Body. In a March 2015 interview with Full of Hell vocalist Dylan Walker, he said: "[It'll] be a really cool thing, and again The Body are another band who are, really, kind of outside the metal scene. It'll be something pretty unexpected; we're actually on tour with them when we get back from Japan, and it's going to be kind of cool because we're going to record the collaboration, without writing anything, right at the end of the tour. I'm really excited to see what we're going to come up with."

In February 2016, the Body and Full of Hell made the closing track "The Little Death" available for online streaming to promote the album. The title is a reference to the French saying "la petite mort," which translates to "the little death" and used to be a reference to a fainting fit but in modern times is used to describe the sensation after an orgasm. The track concludes with an audio sample from the 2010 HBO film You Don't Know Jack starring Al Pacino as the physician-assisted suicide activist, Jack Kevorkian. Weeks later, the group streamed the track "The Butcher"—a song originally written and recorded by Canadian folk musician Leonard Cohen and originally released on his 1969 second studio album, Songs from a Room. On the week of One Day You Will Ache Like I Ache's release, the collaborative group released a music video for the track "Fleshworks".

Both bands will tour together in support of One Day You Will Ache Like I Ache starting with an April 2016 European tour.

== Reception ==
Upon its release, the album was met with widespread acclaim, with many reviewers praising the cohesive collaboration between the two bands. At Metacritic, the album received an average score of 78, based on 6 critics, which indicates "generally favourable reviews". JJ Anselmi from the A.V. Club wrote, "While other groups that release so much material typically lapse into mediocrity at some point, both of these bands are seemingly inexhaustible wells of brilliance."

In a review for Pitchfork, writer Colin Joyce lauded the collaboration as a success, saying, "Even as they explore alien aesthetics, the Body and Full of Hell are constantly finding ways to uphold the spirit of each other's work."

== Track listing ==
1. "One Day You Will Ache Like I Ache" – 4:09
2. "Fleshworks" – 2:55
3. "The Butcher" (originally by Leonard Cohen) – 5:39
4. "Gehorwilt" – 3:10
5. "World of Hope and No Pain" – 0:40
6. "Himmel Und Hölle" – 5:55
7. "Bottled Urn" – 4:13
8. "The Little Death" – 5:00

=== Bonus tracks ===
9. "Cain" – 6:30
10. "Abel" – 4:47

== Personnel ==
- Chip King – guitars, vocals
- Lee Buford – drums, programming
- Dylan Walker – vocals, electronics, noise
- Spencer Hazard – guitar, noise
- David Bland – drums
- Brandon Brown – bass
