= Full of Hell (band) =

American grindcore band

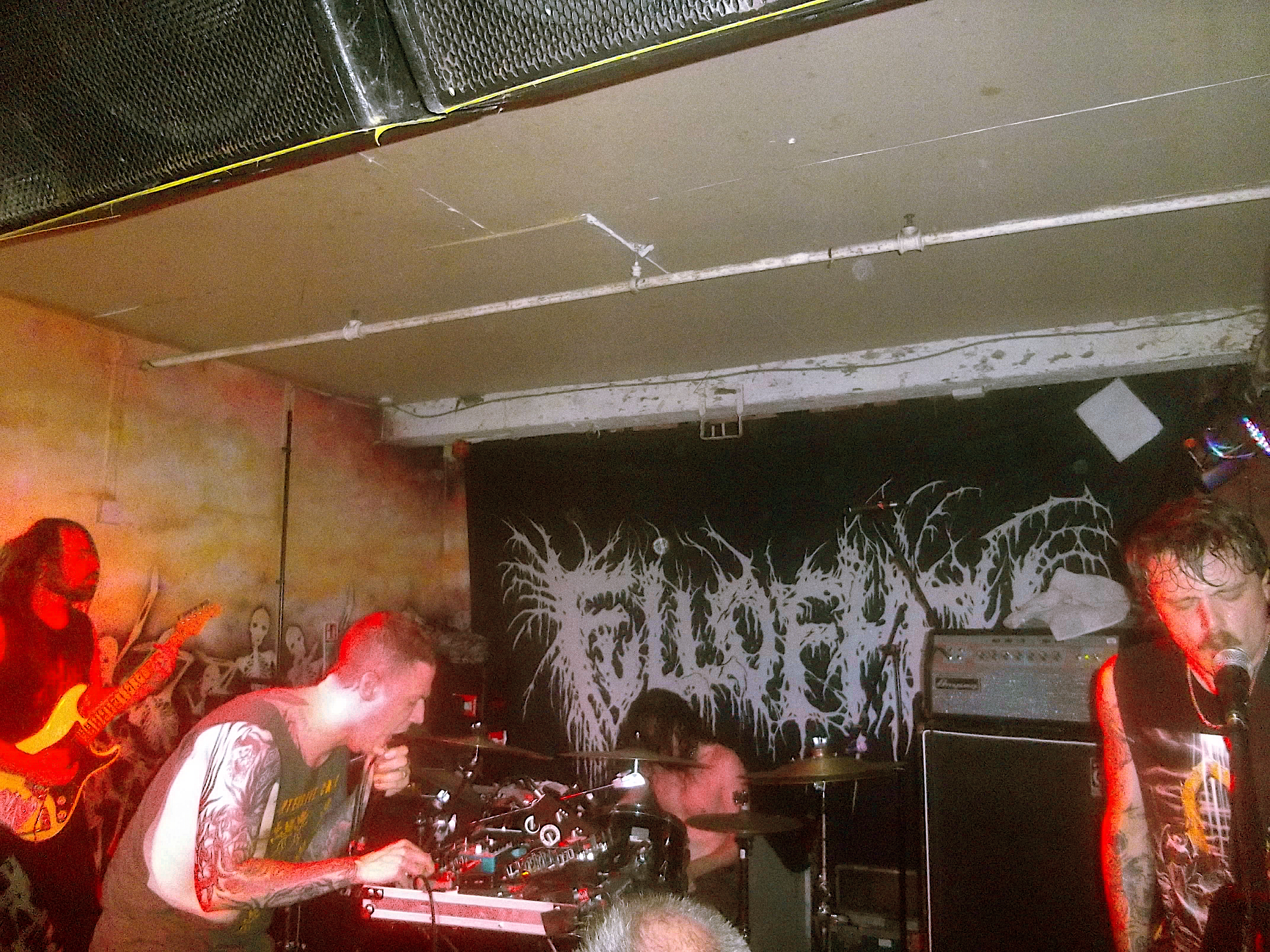
- Full of Hell performing in 2023

Background information
- Origin: Ocean City, Maryland and Pennsylvania, U.S.
- Genres: Grindcore; powerviolence; sludge metal; death metal; noise
- Years active: 2009–present
- Labels: Profound Lore, A389, Neurot, Closed Casket Activities Relapse
- Members: Dylan Walker; Dave Bland; Sam DiGristine; Gabe Solomon
- Past members: Brandon Brown: Spencer Hazard
- Website: fullofhell.com

Full of Hell is an American grindcore band from Ocean City, Maryland, and Central Pennsylvania, that formed in 2009. They are currently signed to Relapse Records and have released six studio albums – Roots of Earth Are Consuming My Home (2011), Rudiments of Mutilation (2013), Trumpeting Ecstasy (2017), Weeping Choir (2019), Garden of Burning Apparitions (2021), and Coagulated Bliss (2024) – as well as several EPs and splits. In addition to studio albums, they've released five collaboration albums – Full of Hell & Merzbow (2014) with Japanese noise artist Merzbow, One Day You Will Ache Like I Ache (2016) and Ascending a Mountain of Heavy Light (2017) with sludge metal band the Body, Suffocating Hallucination with doom metal band Primitive Man in March 2023 and When No Birds Sang with shoegaze band Nothing in December 2023.

== History ==
The band formed in 2009, taking its name from an Entombed song. Having signed to A389 Recordings and Profound Lore Records in their first few years, they released three full-length albums: Roots of Earth Are Consuming My Home in 2011, Rudiments of Mutilation in 2013, and Full of Hell & Merzbow, a collaboration with Japanese noise artist Merzbow, in 2014.

In 2012, the band played at the A389 Bash music festival, an annual event organized by Pulling Teeth guitarist Domenic Romeo. In 2015, original bassist Brandon Brown left the band. He was replaced by Sam DiGristine of Jarhead Fertilizer—an associated act that also features Brown, as well as drummer Dave Bland. Spencer Hazard follows a straight edge lifestyle, while Bland is the only vegan.

On January 8, 2016, Full of Hell released a four-song EP titled Amber Mote in the Black Vault through Bad Teeth Recordings. The release featured three original tracks and a cover of Melvins' track "Oven," originally released on their 1989 album Ozma. Describing their reasoning for selecting this track, the band explained: "We had been wanting to cover a Melvins song for years, and 'Oven' had always been one of our top choices. We've always been very inspired by the Melvins on every level—a totally unique and uncompromising band that has always worked their asses off. They are a band that's undefinable but always recognizable. Totally brilliant. With past covers that we've done, we've always deviated from the source material, but this time we chose to stick close to the original sound and tempo."

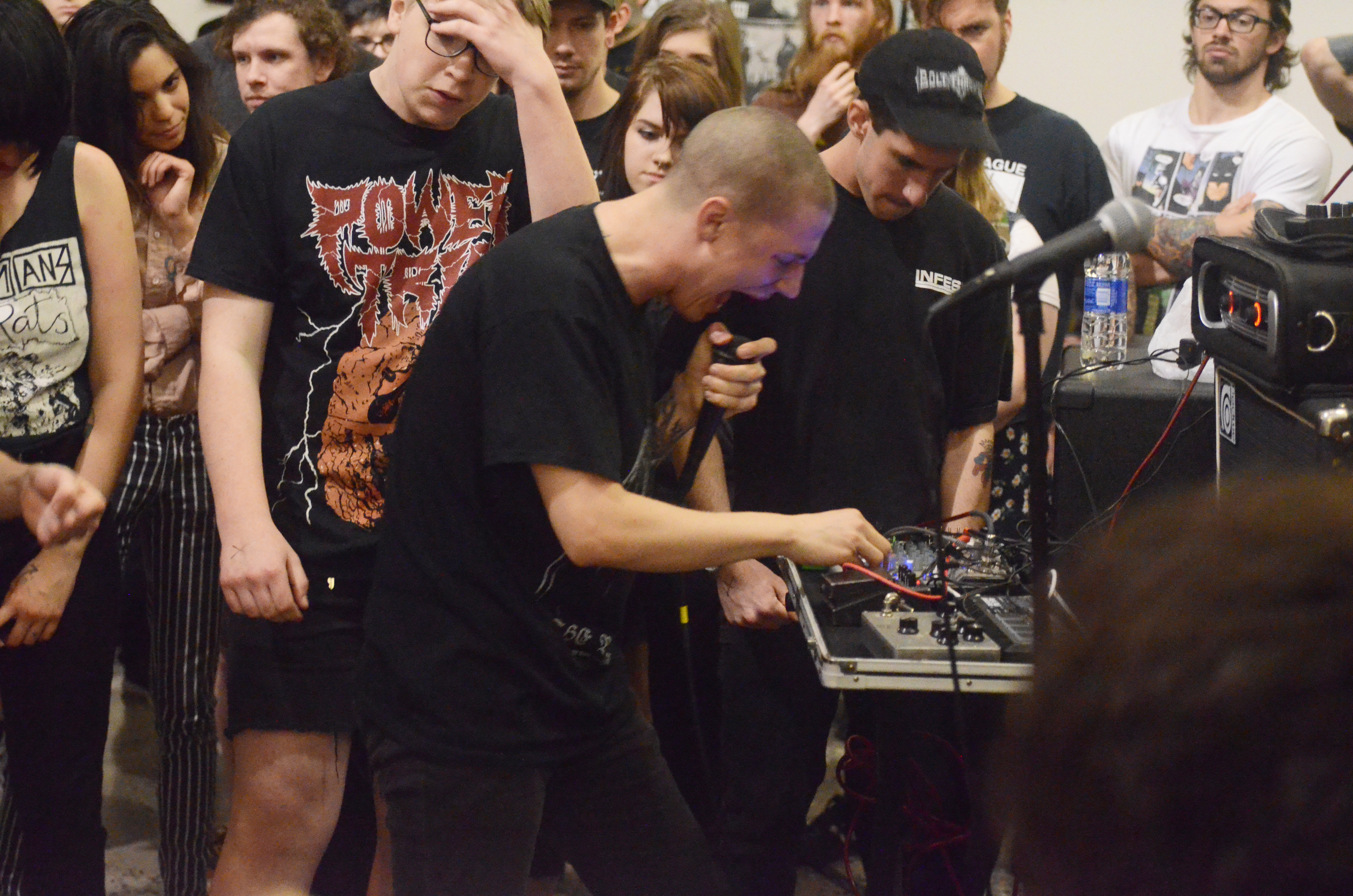
Dylan Walker performing with Full of Hell in Greensboro, North Carolina in April 2015

Full of Hell began plotting to follow up Full of Hell & Merzbow with another collaborative album with avant-garde metal band The Body after a successful 2015 tour together. The two acts expected to head into the studio together to record an album without previously writing any material. Titled One Day You Will Ache Like I Ache, the collaboration album was released on March 25, 2016 through Neurot Recordings—a label founded by members of Neurosis and Tribes of Neurot.

Full of Hell's fifth studio album, Trumpeting Ecstasy was released on May 5, 2017. The album was ranked number 4 on Exclaim!'s Top 10 Metal and Hardcore Albums of 2017.

On February 13, 2018, the band announced that they had signed to Relapse Records. Full of Hell supported Cannibal Corpse on their North American tour in the fall 2025 along with Fulci and Municipal Waste. On December 10, 2025, it was announced that guitarist Spencer Hazard had left the band.

== Musical style ==
Full of Hell have been classified as a powerviolence band "spread[ing] sonic malevolence." The band also incorporates elements of sludge metal, grindcore and noise. The music has been described as "blistering", "brutal" and "experimental".

== Band members ==
=== Current ===
- Dylan Walker – lead vocals, electronics, noise (2009–present)
- Dave Bland – drums, occasional backing vocals (2009–present)
- Sam DiGristine – bass, saxophone, backing vocals (2015–present)
- Gabe Solomon – guitars (2023–present)

=== Former ===
- Brandon Brown – bass, backing vocals (2009–2015)
- Spencer Hazard – guitars, electronics, noise (2009–2025)

== Discography ==
=== Studio albums ===
- Roots of Earth Are Consuming My Home (2011)
- Rudiments of Mutilation (2013)
- Trumpeting Ecstasy (2017)
- Weeping Choir (2019)
- Garden of Burning Apparitions (2021)
- Coagulated Bliss (2024)

=== EPs ===
- Savages EP (2009)
- The Inevitable Fear of Existence (2010)
- F.O.H. Noise (2010)
- F.O.H. Noise: Vol. 2 (2011)
- F.O.H. Noise: Vol. 3 (2012)
- F.O.H. Noise: Vol. 4 (2013)
- Amber Mote in the Black Vault (2015)
- F.O.H. Noise: Vol. 5 (2020)
- Aurora Leaking from an Open Wound (2022)
- Broken Sword, Rotten Shield (2025)

=== Collaborative albums ===
- Full of Hell & Merzbow (collaboration with Merzbow) (2014)
- One Day You Will Ache Like I Ache (collaboration with The Body) (2016)
- Ascending a Mountain of Heavy Light (collaboration with The Body) (2017)
- Suffocating Hallucination (collaboration with Primitive Man) (2023)
- When No Birds Sang (collaboration with Nothing) (2023)
- Scraping the Divine (collaboration with Andrew Nolan) (2024)

=== Splits ===
- Full of Hell / Goldust (2011)
- Full of Hell / Code Orange Kids (2012)
- Full of Hell / Calm the Fire (2012)
- Full of Hell / The Guilt Of... (2012)
- Full of Hell / Psywarfare (2014)
- Nails / Full of Hell (2016)
- Full of Hell / Intensive Care (2018)
- Full of Hell / Gasp (2023)

=== Live releases ===
- Music from the Dial (2013)
- Live at This Is Hardcore Festival 2014 (2015)
- Live at Roadburn (2016)
- Auditory Trauma: Full of Hell Isolation Sessions (2021)
