= Full of Hell & Merzbow =

Studio album (collaboration) by Full of Hell & Merzbow
- Released: November 24, 2014
- Genres: Grindcore, noise
- Length: 23:06
- Label: Profound Lore
- Producer: Kevin Bernsten

Full of Hell chronology
Rudiments of Mutilation (2013)	Full of Hell & Merzbow (2014)	Amber Mote in the Black Vault (2016)

Merzbow chronology
Nezumimochi (2014)	Full of Hell & Merzbow (2014)	Wildwood (2015)

Full of Hell & Merzbow is a collaborative studio album between the American grindcore band Full of Hell and the Japanese noise artist Merzbow. The album was released on November 24, 2014 through Profound Lore Records. The CD version of the album was also packaged with a five-song, 35-minute bonus disc titled Sister Fawn that was described as an "extension" of Full of Hell & Merzbow; it was later released in a digital format as well.

The album received mixed reviews from music critics, with many praising the collaboration between the two artists, however some noted that Merzbow's part in the album was minimal, and only apparent and successful on the album's two longer tracks toward the end: "High Fells" and "Ljudet Av Gud".

== Background and recording ==
We wanted to do a t-shirt as a tribute, just a Full of Hell rip off of the Pulse Demon album art. So we hit up Balazs to see if it was cool, and Masami was cool with it and wanted us to send him one. And from that point came the direct idea of doing a split, Masami wanted to do a split with us. Then soon after he changed his mind and it should just be a collaboration.

— Dylan Walker, Full of Hell vocalist, Noisey interview

At a live performance in New York headlined by Phobia, the members of Full of Hell, who were opening at the show, ran into Merzbow's live drummer Balázs Pándi, who was there to see Phobia. After the show, the band kept in contact with Pándi, who would send them albums he thought they should listen to; the relationship evolved into Pándi becoming their indirect contact with Merzbow frontman Akita Masami, which continued throughout the creation of Full of Hell & Merzbow. Full of Hell vocalist Dylan Walker said, "The communication was definitely minimal with Masami. I don't think he speaks a lot of English, so I think Balázs [Pándi] has been really helpful for him." Full of Hell asked Pándi if they could have permission from Masami to release a shirt paying tribute to the cover art of Merzbow's 1996 album Pulse Demon. In Masami's response, he proposed the idea of doing a split album, but later changed his mind and decided he wanted to do a collaboration album instead.

Merzbow sent the members of Full of Hell approximately 45 minutes of material for them to do with what they saw fit, and had very little contact with Masami during the writing and recording process. Knowing that some fans and critics wouldn't like the finished product, Full of Hell focused their attention on making an album Masami and Balázs would be proud of, and ultimately spent over a year working with the material. Walker said he specifically was inspired how Jamie Saft used Merzbow's source material on his 2006 album Merzdub. On Saft's album, Walker said: "it was so soothing, and it was so cool that he'd be able to warp Merzbow into this new sonic territory; it was a dub album, but like a dub album in space. We hoped that we could achieve something similar by warping Merzbow into our kind of sound. And Masami was really happy with how it turned out so, y'know, naysayers be damned!"

Because of the varying frequencies present in the source material that Masami sent Full of Hell, the band decided to "map out" how they wanted to use it all. Ultimately, they decided to make two separate releases that put different levels of focus on either of the two contributors to the project. For the first disc, Full of Hell & Merzbow, weighted the focus as: "70% Full of Hell, and 30% Merzbow record, so much like a regular Full of Hell record with noise." Originally only available with the CD release of the album, the band included a "second CD hidden within the layout" of the album's packaging titled Sister Fawn, which flipped the approximate weighted ratios, and as a result saw: "70% Merzbow and 30% Full of Hell. We did a lot writing in the studio for the second CD, it has kind of a Tribes of Neurot feel for the second CD."

In addition to collaborating with Merzbow, Full of Hell & Merzbow also features Kevin Morris on horns, and contains excerpts from William Rounseville Alger's novel The Solitudes of Nature and of Man: Or, The Loneliness of Human Life on the tracks "Raise Thee, Great Wall, Bloodied and Terrible" and "Ljudet Av Gud."

== Reception ==
Professional ratings
Review scores
Source	Rating
Drowned in Sound	5/10
Exclaim!	8/10
Pitchfork	5.5/10

Full of Hell & Merzbow was met with mixed reviews from music critics. Writing for Exclaim!, critic Michael Rancic praised the album and scored it with an eight-out-of-ten rating. On the collaboration between the two artists, Rancic said: "The result finds Full of Hell's explosive, breakneck powerviolence stitched together by Masami's squalls of squelches. Though Masami's contributions sound more like black holes than any kind of connective tissue, they're the dark matter that connects each song." However, critics Joseph Rowan of Drowned in Sound and Andy O'Connor of Pitchfork were less impressed with the album and gave it a five and five-and-a-half (both out of ten) respectively, citing too little of Merzbow's sound an influence as a major factor. Rowan said Merzbow, "seems barely present on the heavy tracks and only on two-and-a-half songs could I definitely point to what I presumed was his involvement," and O'Connor described the collaboration as "frustrating because it falls short of its goals, in part due to Merzbow's too-reduced role and that Full of Hell don't make up for the missing space."

While most reviewers were dissatisfied with the lack of Masami's influence on Full of Hell & Merzbow, most critics did praise the album's longer tracks toward the end of the album ("High Fells" and "Ljudet Av Gud") that more noticeably featured Masami's signature noise. Rancic described these tracks as being "more abstract territory" and that ultimately "it's a good look for the band, one that hopefully becomes an approach they deploy again on future records." Rowan compared "High Fells" to Sunn O)))'s song "Alice" from their 2009 album Monoliths & Dimensions, describing it as "the best thing on the album," and also praised the following track "Ljudet Av Gud" as being: "much more like what I was expecting from the album." O'Connor noted praised the doomy "High Fells" for "giving Merzbow more room to cast a wide shadow" and Full of Hell's restraint on "Ljudet Av Gud" for its "booming floor toms and drifting noise undercurrents." O'Connor also praised Full of Hell & Merzbow's bonus CD Sister Fawn, describing it as a "much more satisfying listen than the actual record."

== Track listings ==
=== Full of Hell & Merzbow ===
No.	Title	Length
1.	"Burst Synapse"	1:01
2.	"Gordian Knot"	0:55
3.	"Humming Miter"	0:43
4.	"Blue Litmus"	2:05
5.	"Raise Thee, Great Wall, Bloodied and Terrible"	2:28
6.	"Thrum In the Deep"	2:42
7.	"Shattered Knife"	0:52
8.	"Mute"	0:33
9.	"High Fells"	4:38
10.	"Ljudet Av Gud"	5:43
11.	"Fawn Heads and Unjoy"	1:23
Total length:		23:06

=== Sister Fawn ===
No.	Title	Length
1.	"Ergot"	5:16
2.	"Merzdrone"	4:10
3.	"Aphid"	8:14
4.	"Crumbling Ore"	4:09
5.	"Litany of Desire"	13:46
Total length:		35:37

== Personnel ==
Personnel adapted from CD liner notes.

=== Full of Hell ===
- David Bland – drums
- Brandon Brown – bass, vocals
- Spencer Hazard – guitar, vocals, percussion, electronics
- Dylan Walker – vocals, electronics, percussion

=== Additional musicians ===
- Masami Akita (Merzbow) – electronics
- Kevin Morris – horns

=== Recording and artwork ===
- Kevin Bernsten – recording at Developing Nations
- Brad Boatright – mastering at Audio Siege
- Mark McCoy – artwork, layout

=== Sister Fawn personnel ===
- Masami Akita (Merzbow) – electronics, vocals, percussion, recording
- Spencer Hazard – electronics, vocals, percussion, recording
- Dylan Walker – electronics, vocals, percussion, recording
