= Blanket Waves =

EP by Inventions
- Released: October 16, 2015
- Length: 26:04
- Label: Temporary Residence
- Producer: Matthew Cooper; Mark T. Smith

Inventions chronology
| Maze of Woods (2015) | Blanket Waves (2015) | Continuous Portrait (2020) |

Blanket Waves is an EP by Inventions, a collaborative project between Matthew Cooper and Mark T. Smith. It was released on October 16, 2015, under Temporary Residence Limited. It received mixed or average reviews from critics.

== Background ==
Inventions consists of Matthew Cooper, also known as Eluvium, and Mark T. Smith of Explosions in the Sky. The duo released Inventions (2014) and Maze of Woods (2015). The Blanket Waves EP contains two songs: "Blanket Waves" and "Hearing Loss". Prior to the EP's release, a teaser trailer was released online.

Blanket Waves was released on October 16, 2015, under Temporary Residence Limited. The physical edition of the EP was released on black vinyl, limited to 1,000 copies, as well as on clear with black smoke streaks vinyl, limited to 300 copies.

== Critical reception ==
Professional ratings
Aggregate scores
| Source | Rating |
|---|---|
| Metacritic | 60/100 |
Review scores
| Source | Rating |
| AllMusic | 3.5/5 stars |
| Drowned in Sound | 4/10 |
| PopMatters | 5/10 stars |
| The 405 | 7/10 |

According to the review aggregator Metacritic, Blanket Waves received "mixed or average reviews" based on a weighted average score of 60 out of 100 from 4 critic scores.

Nicholas Glover of The 405 stated, "Like all music created to satisfy the narrative impulse to focus on temporal meaning, stressing the importance of when something happens rather than its relation within a more formal album structure (which always feels like a bunch of people telling a bunch of stories, rather than a single story), Blanket Waves asks for your attention, and suggests you try soundtracking your own life with its echoes of joy and terror." Paul Simpson of AllMusic described the EP as "a surreal, unpredictable excursion," adding that "it finds the duo continuing to venture further outside the styles of their main projects, tapping into their subconscious minds in order to create striking dreamscapes."

== Track listing ==
All tracks are written by Matthew Cooper and Mark T. Smith.

Blanket Waves track listing
| No. | Title | Length |
|---|---|---|
| 1. | "Blanket Waves" | 14:12 |
| 2. | "Hearing Loss" | 11:52 |
| Total length: | | 26:04 |

== Personnel ==
Credits adapted from liner notes.

- Matthew Cooper – performance, production, art direction
- Mark T. Smith – performance, production, art direction
- Roger Seibel – mastering
- Jeremy deVine – layout
