= Continuous Portrait =

Studio album by Inventions
- Released: May 29, 2020
- Length: 37:25
- Label: Temporary Residence

Inventions chronology
Blanket Waves (2015)	Continuous Portrait (2020)

Continuous Portrait is the third studio album by Inventions, a collaborative project between Matthew Cooper and Mark T. Smith. It was released on May 29, 2020, under Temporary Residence Limited. It received generally favorable reviews from critics.

== Background ==
Inventions consists of Matthew Cooper, also known as Eluvium, and Mark T. Smith of Explosions in the Sky. Continuous Portrait is the duo's third studio album, following Inventions (2014) and Maze of Woods (2015). It is the duo's first release of music since the Blanket Waves EP (2015).

Continuous Portrait was released digitally on May 29, 2020, under Temporary Residence Limited. The CD edition and the vinyl edition were released on July 10, 2020, under the same label.

== Critical reception ==
Professional ratings
Aggregate scores
Source	Rating
Metacritic	80/100
Review scores
Source	Rating
AllMusic	3.5/5 stars
Beats Per Minute	80%
Paste	8.5/10
PopMatters	8/10 stars
PopMatters	7/10 stars

According to the review aggregator Metacritic, Continuous Portrait received "generally favorable reviews" based on a weighted average score of 80 out of 100 from 5 critic scores.

Paul Simpson of AllMusic stated, "There's a charming looseness to the album; while never abrasive, the samples sometimes clash with each other a bit, and it all has the feeling of a cut-and-paste collage, sounding far less refined than Eluvium or Explosions' dramatic, labored-over epics." He described the album as "a poignant, playful collection of future memories." Todd Dedman of Beats Per Minute commented that "The album flits between folk-tronica, neo-classical and ambient textures across its nine tracks, and feels like an enriching journey by the record's end." Andrew Sacher of BrooklynVegan stated, "Continuous Portrait acts like ambient music, but there's a real energy to it." He added, "It doesn't just fall into the background, it hooks you and keeps you in suspense, waiting to hear what unexpected turn this duo will take next."

On June 30, 2020, PopMatters included Continuous Portrait on its list of "The 50 Best Albums of 2020 So Far".

== Track listing ==
Continuous Portrait track listing
No.	Title	Length
1.	"Hints and Omens"	5:37
2.	"Calico"	3:57
3.	"Continuous Portrait"	2:54
4.	"Outlook for the Future"	3:30
5.	"Close to People"	3:15
6.	"Spirit Refinement Exploder"	5:14
7.	"The Warmer the Welcome"	3:57
8.	"A Time in My Life"	4:11
9.	"Saw You in a Movie"	4:06
Total length:		37:25

Notes

- "Calico" contains a sample from "Japanese Choir in the Basilica of St. Francis of Assisi" by Spencer Hutchinson.
- "Saw You in a Movie" contains a sample from "Japanese Choir in the Basilica of St. Francis of Assisi" by Spencer Hutchinson.
- "The Warmer the Welcome" contains a sample from "What Are They Doing in Heaven Today?" by Washington Phillips.

== Personnel ==
Credits adapted from liner notes.

- Matthew Robert Cooper
- Mark T. Smith
- Marielle Jakobsons – violin (8)
- Rafael Anton Irisarri – mastering
- Craig McCaffrey – sleeve
- Edwin D. Babbit – illustration ("The Principles of Light and Color")
