= Prince Avalanche (soundtrack) =

Prince Avalanche: An Original Motion Picture Soundtrack

Film score by Explosions in the Sky and David Wingo
- Released: August 6, 2013
- Recorded: 2013
- Genre: Post-rock; experimental; ambience
- Length: 37:35
- Label: Temporary Residence

Explosions in the Sky chronology
Friday Night Lights (2004)	Prince Avalanche (2013)	Lone Survivor (2013)

David Wingo chronology
Mud (2012)	Prince Avalanche (2013)	Joe (2013)

Prince Avalanche: An Original Motion Picture Soundtrack is the soundtrack to the 2013 film Prince Avalanche featuring original music composed by the post-rock band Explosions in the Sky and David Wingo. The album accompanying 15 instrumental tracks, released on August 6, 2013 under the Temporary Residence label to generally positive reviews from critics.

== Development ==
The film marked Wingo's sixth collaboration with David Gordon Green since George Washington (2000), whom further collaborated with the American post-rock band Explosions in the Sky. Wingo claimed the collaboration as "natural" and "organic" due to their friendship between the bandmates, and when the film was under production, he decided to work along with the band after the band previously wrote a song for Snow Angels (2007) as the film was "put together in such a casual and under-the-radar way that it just made perfect sense for this to be that opportunity". The band wrote first two pieces from the cue using classical guitar and piano, which Green responded to it. Wingo called that their musical process was "a matter of them playing me something that was perfect and needed nothing else" and other times, he would have a little room to fill in with some other colors and he took one instrument from the piece he had done and created a new theme based on it. He felt that keeping a running theme throughout was always the goal, as the album consisted of varied material, which sounds in a cohesive way.

The film was shot a year after the Bastrop County Complex Fire, which Wingo felt that amidst the burnt remains there was also a rebirth of the forest, bringing a unique landscape. He did not want to ever overwhelm the silent beauty of the visuals, hence they required to keep a gentle tone in mind and give a sense of beauty and hope within the melancholy. Few of the pieces address the character's mindsets and relationships regardless of the landscape. Wingo felt that the music served as a counterpoint to the visuals in those scenes, that went hand in hand with the characters' internal and external struggles, disconnecting from their soundings.

Wingo and the band had arguments with the instrumentation process, which were few and far between, as they were working on the same page. The film also helped them learning on how to use instrumentation and arrangements to a heightened level, which made them fairly easy to work together.

== Track listing ==
No.	Title	Length
1.	"Fires"	1:29
2.	"Theme from Prince Avalanche"	2:22
3.	"Dear Madison"	1:47
4.	"Passing Time"	1:51
5.	"Rain"	1:08
6.	"Alone Time"	4:59
7.	"Hello, Is This Your House?"	4:10
8.	"Can't We Just Listen to the Silence"	1:35
9.	"Wading"	1:38
10.	"Dear Alvin"	1:21
11.	"The Lines on the Road that Lead You Back Home"	2:00
12.	"An Old Peasant Like Me"	3:47
13.	"Join Me on My Avalanche"	3:29
14.	"The Adventures of Alvin and Lance"	1:50
15.	"Send Off"	4:09
Total length:		37:35

== Reception ==
Aggregator Metacritic, a review aggregating website gave the album 69 out of 100 from 16 critics, indicating "generally favorable reviews".

Gregory Heaney of AllMusic gave four stars to the album and wrote "Prince Avalanche is a beautifully subtle and introspective score that highlights the strong points of its composers while serving the needs of the film it was written for." Kevin Stewart-Panko, writing for Alternative Press gave the album three-and-a-half out of five summarizing "Prince Avalanche contains songs that make this an album you can spin even if you have no interest in the film itself while illustrating the versatility of both EITS and Wingo". Andrew Hannah of The Line of Best Fit gave 8/10 to the album and wrote "If David Gordon Green can get performances this good out of Prince Avalanche stars Paul Rudd and Emile Hirsch then he's on to an absolute winner – Explosions In The Sky and David Wingo are already there." Philip Cosores of Paste assigned 7.7 out of 10, to the album writing "Without the confines of making the songs work with the movie, this could be an exciting direction for the band to explore. The willingness to evolve is present, and the skill and vision to do it well are there too."

Anna Wilson of Clash gave the album 7/10 calling the music as "unanchored and tremulous, but it's still beautiful" and was reminiscent of Mogwai's score for Les Revenants. Brice Ezell of Popmatters also gave 7/10 to the album, saying "As a standalone record, however, Prince Avalanche OST captures a new way for Explosions in the Sky to make instrumental music, even if that requires some circumspection that pulls too tightly on the reins when a looser grip might have been the right move." Jon Dolan of Rolling Stone gave two-and-a-half out of three stars summarising "Explosions in the Sky compact their wide-horizon guitarscapes to fit composer David Wingo's minimalist orchestrations. But as EITS's music for Friday Night Lights proved, they really need a stage as big as a football field." Rating three stars out of five, felt that the soundtrack "works on a smaller scale, capturing fleeting moments in a series of reflective interludes that often pair long, sustained notes over plucked acoustic guitar".

Writing for Drowned in Sound, Dave Hanratty assigned 8/10 to the album, summarising "Prince Avalanche, regardless of what takes the screen, concerns artists returning to their roots. It's an experiment in construction, its sandbox carefully sparse. Fitting then, that Explosions In The Sky find that elusive spark and thrive in such surroundings." Travis Persaud writing for Exclaim! assigned 6/10 to the album, stating it as "very un-Explosions-like", but "works to not only create diversity in their discography, but also as a moody album that can provide moments of levity". Noel Gardener of NME called "It's not an essential listen but it does exhibit plenty of moody gravitas" assigning the same score. Brian Howe of Pitchfork gave 6.5 out of 10 to the album, saying "It's still questionable how this pretty, solemn music will work in the quirky context of Green's film, but it makes for a nice little album on its own." In a mixed review, Steven Arroyo, writing for Consequence assigned a C+ score to the album claiming that "this album feels more like a compilation of demos for an exclusive Explosions-David Wingo collaborative studio album than a soundtrack".

== Charts ==
Chart performance for Prince Avalanche
Chart (2013)	Peak position
US Billboard 200	77
US Independent Albums (Billboard)	15
US Indie Store Album Sales (Billboard)	13
US Top Rock Albums (Billboard)	21
