= Golden Retriever (disambiguation) =

The Golden Retriever is a dog breed.

Golden Retriever may also refer to:

- "Golden Retriever" (song), by Super Furry Animals
- Golden Retriever (band), a musical group from Portland, Oregon

== See also ==
- Golden retriever egg challenge
