= Leaves Eclipse the Light =

EP by Eluvium
- Released: September 14, 2010
- Genre: Ambient
- Length: 24:10
- Label: Temporary Residence Limited

Eluvium chronology
Similes (2010)	Leaves Eclipse the Light (2010)	Static Nocturne (2010)

Professional ratings
Review scores
Source	Rating
PlayGround	8/10

Leaves Eclipse the Light is an EP from Portland, OR ambient musician Matthew Cooper, under the name Eluvium, following the release of the "artistically daring and critically acclaimed" album Similes. The album features the first track from the aforementioned album, a new 11-minute unreleased ambient track à la Talk Amongst the Trees, the remix of "The Motion Makes Me Last" by electronic/dance musician Four Tet which was featured on the BBC Radio 1 2-hour-long Four Tet Essential Mix and finally the video of "The Motion Makes Me Last" directed by artist and filmmaker Matt McCormick.

Leaves Eclipse the Light is the first installment in a series of 2 EPs. The second one is The Motion Makes Me Last, also presenting and named after a song on Similes and featuring a remix of a song from that album.

== Track listing ==
1. "Leaves Eclipse the Light" – 5:39
2. "A Life in Tides Less Current" – 10:41
3. "The Motion Makes Me Last (Four Tet Remix)" – 7:49
