= FNL =

FNL may refer to:

- Czech National Football League (Czech: Fotbalová národní liga)
- Far North Line, a rail line in Scotland
- Fluctuation and Noise Letters, a scholarly journal
- Fort Collins-Loveland Municipal Airport in Colorado, United States
- Fox News Live, an American news program
- Friday Night Lights (disambiguation)
- Friday Night Live (disambiguation)
- National Forces of Liberation (French: Forces Nationales de Liberation) in Burundi
- National Front for the Liberation of South Vietnam (French: Front National de Libération)
- Russian Football National League (Russian: Первенство Футбольной Национальной Лиги, Pervenstvo Futbol'noy Natsional'noy Ligi)
