= Take Care (disambiguation) =

Take Care is a 2011 album by Drake.

Take Care may also refer to:

- Take Care (BigXthaPlug album), 2024
- "Take Care" (song), the title song of the Drake album
- Take Care (film), a 2014 comedy-drama film
- Take Care (poetry collection), a 2021 poetry collection by Eunice Andrada
- Take Care (musician), an alias of Irish musician Liam McCay/Sign Crushes Motorist
- "Take Care", a 1956 song by Jane Morgan
- "Take Care," a 1978 song by Big Star from Third
- "Take Care", a 2006 song by Janet Jackson from 20 Y.O.
- "Take Care", a 2010 song by Beach House from Teen Dream
- "Take Care", a 2011 song by Jennifer Lopez from Love?
- "take care", a 2018 song by Eden from vertigo
- Take Care, a conservation program developed by primatologist Jane Goodall
- "Take Care", a music project by Liam McCay, see Sign Crushes Motorist

== See also ==
- Take Care, Take Care, Take Care, a 2011 album by Explosions in the Sky
