= Inventions (band) =

- Genres: Experimental music, post-rock
- Years active: 2013–present
- Labels: Temporary Residence Limited
- Members: Matthew Cooper; Mark T. Smith

Inventions is an American musical ensemble signed to Temporary Residence Records, consisting of Matthew Cooper of Eluvium and Mark T. Smith of Explosions in the Sky.

Inventions formed in 2013 as a side project for both musicians, whose main projects were signed to the same record label. In April 2014, the pair released a self-titled album which reached No. 22 on the Billboard Heatseekers chart.

Inventions also released Maze of Woods (2015) and Continuous Portrait (2020).

== Discography ==
=== Studio albums ===
- Inventions (Temporary Residence Limited, 2014)
- Maze of Woods (Temporary Residence Limited/Bella Union, 2015)
- Continuous Portrait (Temporary Residence Limited, 2020)

=== EPs ===
- Remixed (Temporary Residence Limited, 2015)
- Blanket Waves (Temporary Residence Limited, 2015)

=== Singles ===
- "Springworlds" (Temporary Residence Limited, 2015)
