= End (album) =

Studio album by Explosions in the Sky
- Released: September 15, 2023
- Genre: Post-rock
- Length: 45:26
- Label: Temporary Residence Limited
- Producer: Explosions in the Sky; John Congleton

Explosions in the Sky chronology
The Wilderness (2016)	End (2023)

Singles from End
- 1. "Ten Billion People" Released: July 17, 2023; 2. "Moving On" Released: August 21, 2023

End is the eighth studio album by American post-rock band Explosions in the Sky, released on September 15, 2023, through Temporary Residence Limited.

== Background and promotion ==
The album was announced alongside the release of lead single "Ten Billion People". The band toured in North America, Europe and the UK in support of the record from September 15 to November 20, 2023.

In a press release accompanying the announcement, the band stated that End was not the band's final album but that the album's "starting point was the concept of an ending—death, or the end of a friendship or relationship".

== Critical reception ==
Professional ratings
Aggregate scores
Source	Rating
AnyDecentMusic?	7.2/10
Metacritic	73/100
Review scores
Source	Rating
AllMusic	3.5/5 stars
Exclaim!	7/10
Mojo	3/5 stars
Uncut	8/10

End received a score of 73 out of 100 on review aggregator Metacritic based on ten critics' reviews, indicating "generally favorable" reception. Mojo called it "a 'rumination on life and death', which suitably chimed with earth's current 'end times' vibe, from sorrow to rage, elevated by post-rock's most luminescent guitars." Uncut found that "the music is varied, best expressed by 'Peace or Quiet', which stretches their loud-quiet dynamic as far as it can go". Paul Simpson of AllMusic felt that End "incorporates a lot of the touches and techniques that made The Wilderness stand out in the group's discography, from rippling electronics to post-minimalist repetition". Bruno Coulombe of Exclaim! stated that the album "feels like a return to form" and "contrary to The Wilderness, there are no formless ambient numbers to quell the energy between the more consistent, epic compositions".

== Track listing ==
End track listing
No.	Title	Length
1.	"Ten Billion People"	6:29
2.	"Moving On"	4:33
3.	"Loved Ones"	6:10
4.	"Peace or Quiet"	6:26
5.	"All Mountains"	7:25
6.	"The Fight"	6:20
7.	"It's Never Going to Stop"	8:03
Total length:		45:26

== Personnel ==
Explosions in the Sky

- Chris Hrasky – drums, production
- Michael James – guitar, production
- Munaf Rayani – guitar, production
- Mark T. Smith – guitar, production

Additional contributors

- John Congleton – production, mixing, engineering
- Ben Dickey – design
- Bernie Grundman – mastering
- Diego Mendoza – engineering assistance
- Gerardo "Jerry" Ordóñez – engineering assistance
- Pat Perry – artwork

== Charts ==
Chart performance for End
Chart (2023)	Peak position
Belgian Albums (Ultratop Flanders)	197
Scottish Albums (OCC)	40
UK Album Downloads (OCC)	44
UK Independent Albums (OCC)	24
US Indie Store Album Sales (Billboard)	11
US Top Album Sales (Billboard)	21
US Vinyl Albums (Billboard)	8
