= Piano Works =

Piano Works may refer to:

== Music ==
=== Compositions ===
- "Piano Works", a composition by Ed Starink, part of Starink's Universe Symphony
- Piano Works, published edition name of many printed editions of sheet music, particularly:
  - Piano Works' Johann Nepomuk Hummel

=== Albums ===
Own compositions

- Piano Works, album by Igor Khoroshev 1999
- Piano Works, album by Denver Oldham 1992
- Piano Works (Craig Armstrong album)
- The Piano Works, album by Conrad Schnitzler 1997
- Around Brazil, by Simon Nabatov, 2005, also known as Piano Works V: Around Brazil
- Pianoworks, by Eluvium, 2019

Classical pianists

- The Piano Works, album by Fujiko Hemming 2009
- Piano Works, series of albums recorded by Margaret Fingerhut

== See also ==
- Piano works (Bruckner)
