= The Wilderness (Explosions in the Sky album) =

Studio album by Explosions in the Sky
- Released: April 1, 2016
- Genre: Post-rock, electronic rock
- Length: 46:20
- Label: Temporary Residence Limited
- Producer: Explosions in the Sky; John Congleton

Explosions in the Sky chronology
Take Care, Take Care, Take Care (2011)	The Wilderness (2016)	End (2023)

Singles from The Wilderness
- 1. "Disintegration Anxiety" Released: January 10, 2016; 2. "Logic of a Dream" Released: February 29, 2016

The Wilderness is the seventh studio album by American post-rock band Explosions in the Sky, released on April 1, 2016, through Temporary Residence Limited.

== Critical reception ==
Professional ratings
Aggregate scores
Source	Rating
AnyDecentMusic?	7.5/10
Metacritic	80/100
Review scores
Source	Rating
AllMusic	4/5 stars
The Austin Chronicle	5/5 stars
Consequence of Sound	4/5 stars
The Guardian	4/5 stars
The Line of Best Fit	9/10
Pitchfork	8.0/10
Rock Sound	8/10
Rolling Stone	3.5/5 stars
Q	4/5 stars
Uncut	8/10

The album has received positive reviews from critics, and Metacritic has assigned it an average score of 80/100 based on 26 critics. Dave Simpson for The Guardian called it a "beautifully understated epic" and rewarded the album 4 out of 5 stars. Johnathan K. Dick, writing for Consequence of Sound stated that, "The Wilderness proves that Explosions in the Sky aren't stuck in any creative rut." and gave the album a B+. Paul Simpson for AllMusic said, "On The Wilderness, Explosions in the Sky deconstruct and rebuild their sound from the ground up, giving it a revitalized sense of urgency and resulting in some of their most dynamic work yet." Pitchfork gave the album 8/10 and said it is "their best since The Earth is Not a Cold Dead Place."

Mojo, in their May 2016 issue, stated, "Although recognisably, and powerfully, the work of Explosions In The Sky this is now a band whose music undulates."

The cover and insert artwork are parts of a painting entitled "8th and Main" by Jacob van Loon.

=== Accolades ===
Accolades for The Wilderness
Publication	Accolade	Year	Rank
Consequence of Sound	Top 50 Albums of 2016	2016	32
Rough Trade	Albums of the Year	2016	57

== Track listing ==
The Wilderness track listing
No.	Title	Length
1.	"Wilderness"	4:36
2.	"The Ecstatics"	3:12
3.	"Tangle Formations"	5:34
4.	"Logic of a Dream"	6:37
5.	"Disintegration Anxiety"	4:11
6.	"Losing the Light"	6:02
7.	"Infinite Orbit"	2:37
8.	"Colors in Space"	7:14
9.	"Landing Cliffs"	6:17
Total length:		46:20

== Charts ==
Chart performance for The Wilderness
Chart (2016)	Peak position
Australian Hitseekers Albums (ARIA)	5
Belgian Albums (Ultratop Flanders)	33
Belgian Albums (Ultratop Wallonia)	61
Canadian Albums (Billboard)	94
German Albums (Offizielle Top 100)	98
Irish Albums (IRMA)	77
Scottish Albums (OCC)	21
Swiss Albums (Schweizer Hitparade)	93
UK Albums (OCC)	39
UK Independent Albums (OCC)	11
US Billboard 200	24
US Independent Albums (Billboard)	1
US Indie Store Album Sales (Billboard)	1
US Top Alternative Albums (Billboard)	2
US Top Rock Albums (Billboard)	2
