= Some Days Are Better Than Others =

Some Days Are Better Than Others can refer to

- "Some Days Are Better Than Others" (U2 song), a song from the eighth studio album Zooropa (1993) by Irish rock band U2.
- Some Days Are Better Than Others (film), a 2009 film starring Carrie Brownstein and James Mercer
