= Friday Night Lights =

Friday Night Lights may refer to:

- Friday Night Lights: A Town, a Team, and a Dream, a 1990 non-fiction book by H. G. Bissinger
  - Friday Night Lights (film), a 2004 film based on the book
    - Friday Night Lights (film soundtrack), the soundtrack of the 2004 film
  - Friday Night Lights (TV series), a 2006 TV series based on the book and film
    - Friday Night Lights (television soundtrack)
    - Friday Night Lights Vol. 2 (television soundtrack)
- Friday Night Lights (Attic Lights album), an album by Attic Lights
- Friday Night Lights (mixtape), a mixtape by J. Cole

== See also ==
- Friday Night (disambiguation)
