= Lambent Material =

Studio album by Eluvium
- Released: May 6, 2003
- Genre: Ambient
- Length: 35:51
- Label: Temporary Residence

Eluvium chronology
Lambent Material (2003)	An Accidental Memory in the Case of Death (2004)

Lambent Material is the debut studio album by American ambient musician Matthew Cooper under the name Eluvium. It was released on May 6, 2003, through Temporary Residence Limited.

== Background ==
Eluvium's Matthew Cooper is based in Portland, Oregon. Lambent Material is his debut release. Emily Wahl plays clarinet on the album's song "There Wasn't Anything". All other instruments on the album are played by Matthew Cooper.

== Critical reception ==
Professional ratings
Review scores
Source	Rating
AllMusic	4.5/5 stars
Cokemachineglow	87%
Pitchfork	6.2/10
Stylus Magazine	A−
Tiny Mix Tapes	4.5/5 stars

Jean-Pierre of Tiny Mix Tapes stated, "All instrumental and filled with tone and drone, the album's influences are definitely Eno, possibly Mogwai's more drone-y moments, some Keith Fullerton Whitman and even a little Sigur Ros in places." He added, "Building on these great foundations, Lambent Material offers something fresh to the listener." Rob Theakston of AllMusic commented that "the drones, washes, and layers are all there and in full force, with no filler or wasted space." He added, "Every note is meaningful and relevant, no matter how many times looped or manipulated." Scott Reid of Cokemachineglow stated, "Lambent Material is able to work so well because of the simplicity of the arrangements and the strength of the moods created." He added, "Within each song, Eluvium (aka Matthew Cooper) uses the repetitive drones to manipulate subtle shifts in intensity, allowing the music to completely overtake the listeners with even the most minimal level of active participation."

== Track listing ==
Lambent Material track listing
No.	Title	Length
1.	"The Unfinished"	4:38
2.	"Under the Water It Glowed"	5:09
3.	"There Wasn't Anything"	4:40
4.	"Zerthis Was a Shivering Human Image"	15:35
5.	"I Am So Much More Me That You Are Perfectly You"	5:49
Total length:		35:51

== Personnel ==
Credits adapted from liner notes.

- Matthew Cooper – instruments, arrangement, booklet photography
- Emily Wahl – clarinet (3), clarinet arrangement (3)
- Jeremy deVine – design, layout
- Noel Anthony Javier – other photography
