= Friday Night Lights (television soundtrack) =

Soundtrack album by various artists
- Released: July 2007
- Genre: Soundtrack
- Length: 62:03
- Label: Adrenaline Records
- Producers: Liza Richardson; Jonathan McHugh; Jonathan Platt; Jonathan Miller

Professional ratings
Review scores
Source	Rating
Music Box	3/5 stars

Friday Night Lights is the soundtrack for the television series Friday Night Lights, a program inspired by the film of the same name.

Although post-rock band Explosions in the Sky wrote most of the film's soundtrack, the music for the television series was a more accessible affair, with bands such as The Killers and OutKast featuring on it. One Explosions in the Sky track did appear on the soundtrack album, however, with "First Breath After Coma" (from their album The Earth is Not a Cold Dead Place) becoming the album closer.

== Track listing ==
1. "Devil Town" – Tony Lucca
2. "Read My Mind" – The Killers (Like Rebel Diamonds mix)
3. "I Turn My Camera On" – Spoon
4. "Idlewild Blues" – OutKast
5. "Everything I Do" – Whiskeytown
6. "Rewind" – Stereophonics
7. "Keep Us Together" – Starsailor
8. "Big Big Kid" – Jibbs
9. "So Divided" – ...And You Will Know Us by the Trail of Dead
10. "Goodbye" – Drive-By Truckers
11. "Dead Man's Will" – Calexico/Iron & Wine
12. "Storm" – José González
13. "I Remember" – Chris Brokaw
14. "First Breath After Coma" – Explosions in the Sky
