= False Readings On =

Studio album by Eluvium
- Released: September 2, 2016
- Studio: Watership Sounds
- Length: 66:19
- Label: Temporary Residence
- Producer: Matthew Cooper

Eluvium chronology
Nightmare Ending (2013)	False Readings On (2016)	Shuffle Drones (2017)

False Readings On is a studio album by American musician Matthew Cooper under the pseudonym Eluvium. It was released on September 2, 2016, through Temporary Residence Limited, and received universal acclaim from critics.

== Background ==
Matthew Cooper, also known as Eluvium, is an American musician. False Readings On is his first studio album since Nightmare Ending (2013). He drew inspiration from "themes of cognitive dissonance in modern society." The album was released on September 2, 2016, through Temporary Residence Limited, on CD, black vinyl, light gray vinyl, and digitally.

== Critical reception ==
Professional ratings
Aggregate scores
Source	Rating
Metacritic	81/100
Review scores
Source	Rating
AllMusic	4/5 stars
The A.V. Club	B+
Drowned in Sound	8/10
Exclaim!	8/10
Pitchfork	7.0/10
PopMatters	8/10
Tiny Mix Tapes	3.5/5 stars

According to the review aggregator Metacritic, False Readings On received "universal acclaim" based on a weighted average score of 81 out of 100 from 8 critic scores.

Paul Simpson of AllMusic stated, "The main element that sticks out on this album is Cooper's occasional somewhat jarring usage of operatic vocal samples." He added, "On several pieces, he builds up layers of wavy synthesizer drones and gliding guitars before inserting eerie, disembodied vocal trills." Luke Pearson of Exclaim! called the album "another strikingly beautiful work from Eluvium."

=== Accolades ===
Accolades for False Readings On
Publication	List	Rank	Ref.
PopMatters	The 70 Best Albums of 2016	70	

== Track listing ==
All tracks are written by Matthew Cooper.

False Readings On track listing
No.	Title	Length
1.	"Strangeworks"	4:23
2.	"Fugue State"	7:36
3.	"Drowning Tone"	0:59
4.	"Regenerative Being"	7:21
5.	"Washer Logistics"	4:05
6.	"Movie Night Revisited"	4:29
7.	"Beyond the Moon for Someone in Reverse"	8:51
8.	"False Readings On"	1:22
9.	"Rorschach Pavan"	6:43
10.	"Individuation"	3:08
11.	"Posturing Through Metaphysical Collapse"	17:22
Total length:		66:19

== Personnel ==
Credits adapted from liner notes.

- Matthew Cooper – piano, synthesizer, guitar, sampler, tape, arrangement, performance, production, design
- Francesco Donadello – mastering
- Jeannie L. Paske – artwork
