= Copia (album) =

Studio album by Eluvium
- Released: February 20, 2007
- Recorded: Summer 2006
- Genre: Ambient
- Length: 54:45
- Label: Temporary Residence

Eluvium chronology
When I Live by the Garden and the Sea (2006)	Copia (2007)	Similes (2010)

Professional ratings
Aggregate scores
Source	Rating
Metacritic	84/100
Review scores
Source	Rating
AllMusic	4.5/5 stars
Cokemachineglow	70%
Drowned in Sound	9/10
Pitchfork	7.7/10
PopMatters	7/10
Sputnikmusic	4.5/5
Tiny Mix Tapes	4/5 stars

Copia is the fourth album from Portland, Oregon ambient musician Matthew Cooper, under the name Eluvium. The album features many more instruments than much of Cooper's past material, such as brass and string instruments. The cover illustration is Jeannie Paske's watercolor and ink, titled In Search of a View.

== Track listing ==
1. "Amreik" – 3:18
2. "Indoor Swimming at the Space Station" – 10:29
3. "Seeing You Off the Edges" – 5:03
4. "Prelude for Time Feelers" – 5:48
5. "Requiem on Frankfort Ave." – 2:41
6. "Radio Ballet" – 3:12
7. "(Intermission)" – 0:50
8. "After Nature" – 1:51
9. "Reciting the Airships" – 4:35
10. "Ostinato" – 6:08
11. "Hymn #1" – 1:32
12. "Repose in Blue" – 9:18
