= The Motion Makes Me Last =

EP by Eluvium
- Released: December 7, 2010
- Genre: Ambient
- Length: 19:30
- Label: Temporary Residence Limited

Eluvium chronology
Static Nocturne (2010)	The Motion Makes Me Last (2010)	Nightmare Ending (2013)

The Motion Makes Me Last is an EP from Portland, Oregon-based ambient musician Matthew Cooper, under the name Eluvium. The EP is a follow-up to the Leaves Eclipse the Light EP released a few months earlier. The album features the second track from Similes, two unreleased instrumental / ambient tracks and a remix of "Leaves Eclipse the Light" by Nick Zammuto from The Books.

== Track listing ==
1. "The Motion Makes Me Last" – 5:25
2. "Crash Deconstructed" – 5:36
3. "Remnant Signals" – 5:06
4. "Leaves Eclipse The Light (Nick Zammuto Remix)" - 3:23
