= NOS Primavera Sound 2017 =

Portuguese music festival

The NOS Primavera Sound 2017 was held on 8 to 10 June 2017 at the Parque da Cidade, Porto, Portugal. The festival was headlined by Bon Iver, Aphex Twin and Justice.

== Lineup ==
Headline performers are listed in boldface. Artists listed from latest to earliest set times.

=== NOS ===
Thursday, 8 June	Friday, 9 June	Saturday, 10 June
**Justice**; Run the Jewels; Miguel; Cigarettes After Sex	Nicolás Jaar; **Bon Iver**; Angel Olsen; Pond	**Aphex Twin**; Metronomy; The Growlers; Evols

Bon Iver set list
1. "22 (OVER S∞∞N)"
2. "10 d E A T h b R E a s T ⚄ ⚄"
3. "715 - CREEKS"
4. "33 “GOD”"
5. "29 #Strafford APTS"
6. "666 ʇ"
7. "21 M♢♢N WATER"
8. "Perth"
9. "Minnesota, WI"
10. "Beach Baby"
11. "Towers"
12. "8 (circle)"
13. "____45_____"
14. "Holocene"
15. "Calgary"
16. "Creature Fear"

Encore

17. "Skinny Love"
Aphex Twin set list
1. "Pretend Analog Extmix 2b,e2,ru"
2. "Untitled 7"
3. "Meadow"
4. "umil 25-01"
5. "3 Notes Con"
6. "Fredugolon 6"
7. "Juniper"
8. "3000000 (W3C Remix)"
9. "Mi Raza"
10. "Point of No Return"
11. "Ziberterai"
12. "Apathetic (W3C Remix)"
13. "Boxing Day"
14. "Dance2thebeat"
15. "Mangle 11 (Circuit Bent VIP Mix)"
16. "Acid Beta Test"
17. "Phase 4"
18. "The Garden of Linmiri"
19. "PAPAT4 (pineal mix)"
20. "Win in the Flat World"
21. "Physically"
22. "Meshes"
23. "Clissold VIP"
24. "Worldwide Shit"

=== Super Bock ===
Thursday, 8 June	Friday, 9 June	Saturday, 10 June
Flying Lotus; Arab Strap; Rodrigo Leão & Scott Matthew; Samuel Úria	Skepta; Teenage Fanclub; Whitney; First Breath After Coma	Japandroids; Sampha; Elza Soares; Núria Graham

=== Palco ===
Friday, 9 June	Saturday, 10 June
King Gizzard & the Lizard Wizard; Swans; Sleaford Mods; Royal Trux; Jeremy Jay	The Black Angels; Make-Up; Death Grips; Shellac; Wand; Songhoy Blues

=== Pitchfork ===
Friday, 9 June	Saturday, 10 June
Mano Le Tough; Richie Hawtin; Cymbals Eat Guitars; Hamilton Leithauser; Julien Baker; Nikki Lane	Marc Piñol; Bicep; Tycho; Against Me!; Operators; Weyes Blood; Mitski
