= (Whirring Marvels In) Consensus Reality =

Studio album by Eluvium
- Released: May 12, 2023
- Genre: Electronic
- Length: 41:12
- Label: Temporary Residence
- Producer: Matthew Robert Cooper

Eluvium chronology
Virga II (2021)	(Whirring Marvels In) Consensus Reality (2023)	Virga III (2026)

(Whirring Marvels In) Consensus Reality is a studio album by American composer Matthew Robert Cooper under the pseudonym Eluvium. It was released on May 12, 2023, through Temporary Residence Limited. It received universal acclaim from critics.

== Background ==
Matthew Robert Cooper, also known as Eluvium, is an American composer. (Whirring Marvels In) Consensus Reality took inspiration from T. S. Eliot's The Waste Land and Richard Brautigan's "All Watched Over by Machines of Loving Grace". He created the album remotely with members of the American Contemporary Music Ensemble (ACME), Golden Retriever, and the Budapest Scoring Orchestra. It is his first album to feature a full live orchestra.

The album was released on May 12, 2023, through Temporary Residence Limited.

== Critical reception ==
Professional ratings
Aggregate scores
Source	Rating
Metacritic	84/100
Review scores
Source	Rating
AllMusic	4/5 stars
The Line of Best Fit	8/10
MusicOMH	4.5/5 stars
Spectrum Culture	70%

According to the review aggregator Metacritic, (Whirring Marvels In) Consensus Reality received "universal acclaim" based on a weighted average score of 84 out of 100 from 4 critic scores.

Jack Bray of The Line of Best Fit praised the album's "commitment to opposing ideas and the curveballs it throws your way in pursuit of them." He added, "Where one song might see Cooper deal with the onward march of technology, another will see him harken back to the kind of loneliness and isolationism many of us will recognise from our time in lockdown." Fred Thomas of AllMusic wrote, "Though his inspirations might have been dystopic thoughts of algorithms and robotic interaction, the buoyant strings and inspiring compositions ultimately mirror human nature's endless questing more than anything else."

=== Accolades ===
Year-end lists for (Whirring Marvels In) Consensus Reality
Publication	List	Rank	Ref.
AllMusic	Favorite Electronic Albums	—	

== Track listing ==
All tracks are written by Matthew Robert Cooper.

(Whirring Marvels In) Consensus Reality track listing
No.	Title	Length
1.	"Escapement"	1:36
2.	"Swift Automatons"	2:36
3.	"Vibration Consensus Reality (for Spectral Multiband Resonator)"	8:00
4.	"Scatterbrains"	3:33
5.	"Phantasia Telephonics"	5:55
6.	"The Violet Light"	2:30
7.	"Void Manifest"	4:10
8.	"Clockwork Fables"	2:16
9.	"Mass Lossless Interbeing"	3:43
10.	"A Floating World of Demons"	3:04
11.	"Endless Flower"	3:45
Total length:		41:12

== Personnel ==
Credits adapted from liner notes.

- Matthew Robert Cooper – piano, synthesizer, voice, virtual instruments, modular synthesis, sampler, orchestration, production, mixing
- Ben Russell – violin
- Jonathan Sielaff – bass clarinet
- Charlotte Mundy – vocals, noise, screaming
- Ben Shafer – horn
- Budapest Scoring Orchestra – additional instrumentation
- Conor Abbott Brown – orchestration, additional orchestra assistance
- Denes Redly – Budapest Scoring Orchestra recording
- Viktor Szabo – Budapest Scoring Orchestra recording
- Rafael Anton Irisarri – mastering
- Craig McCaffrey – sleeve
- Jeannie Lynn Paske – cover art ("A Substitute for Any Larger Form of Thought")
