= Pianoworks =

Studio album by Eluvium
- Released: May 31, 2019
- Genre: Ambient
- Length: 51:01
- Label: Temporary Residence
- Producer: Matthew Cooper

Eluvium chronology
Shuffle Drones (2017)	Pianoworks (2019)	Virga I (2020)

Pianoworks is the tenth studio album by American ambient artist Matthew Cooper under the moniker Eluvium. The album was released on May 31, 2019, through Temporary Residence and consists solely of piano compositions. It received generally favorable reviews from critics.

== Background ==
Pianoworks is Eluvium's first solo studio album since Shuffle Drones (2017), and his first solo piano album since An Accidental Memory in the Case of Death (2004). The album was inspired by "the quiet thoughts and solitary observations of children."

== Release ==
The standard edition of the album comes in CD and 2LP formats, while the deluxe edition comes in 2CD and 3LP formats. The latter comes with the bonus album, titled Pianoworks Vol. 2, which contains solo piano recordings of Eluvium's past compositions.

In conjunction with the album, Eluvium also released the Pianoworks sheet music book, a 76-page performance guide containing transcriptions of every solo piano song in Eluvium's discography.

== Critical reception ==
Professional ratings
Aggregate scores
Source	Rating
Metacritic	73/100
Review scores
Source	Rating
AllMusic	3.5/5 stars
Exclaim!	6/10
Pitchfork	7.6/10
PopMatters	7/10 stars

According to the review aggregator Metacritic, Pianoworks received "generally favorable reviews" based on a weighted average score of 73 out of 100 from 4 critic scores.

Fred Thomas of AllMusic stated, "The 13 tracks here are spare, lonely, and muted, played with a sense of remove that suggests both nostalgia and the resurfacing of lost memories." Brian Howe of Pitchfork commented that "The compositions are consummate Eluvium, but the signature childlike wonder is underscored with mature regret and intellect." Ed Whitelock of PopMatters called the album "Eluvium's most immediately accessible record to date." Adam Feibel of Exclaim! commented that "It is thoughtfully composed but, for the most part, emotionally flat, and at times even feels rather metronomic and inhuman." Nathan Stevens of Spectrum Culture called it "a wondrous, welcoming album."

Amy X. Wang of Rolling Stone named Pianoworks the fifth best album of 2019.

== Track listing ==
All tracks are written by Matthew Cooper.

Pianoworks track listing
No.	Title	Length
1.	"Recital"	3:51
2.	"Quiet Children"	4:24
3.	"Carrier 32"	2:49
4.	"Inherent Mosaic"	2:46
5.	"Transfiguration One"	4:45
6.	"Masquerade"	2:42
7.	"Underwater Dream"	4:02
8.	"Vacuous Plenum"	3:49
9.	"Transfiguration Two"	3:37
10.	"Paper Autumnalia"	4:17
11.	"Myriad Days"	1:59
12.	"Soliloquy & Aside"	5:46
13.	"Empathy for a Silhouette"	6:07
Total length:		51:01

Deluxe edition bonus tracks
No.	Title	Length
1.	"An Accidental Memory in the Case of Death"	3:05
2.	"Genius and the Thieves"	1:49
3.	"Perfect Neglect in a Field of Stautes"	5:39
4.	"Nepenthe"	3:14
5.	"In a Sense"	1:41
6.	"The Well-Meaning Professor"	7:09
7.	"Prelude for Time Feelers"	5:20
8.	"Radio Ballet"	3:30
9.	"Hymn #1"	1:23
10.	"Caroling"	3:44
11.	"Impromptu (For the Procession)"	3:44
12.	"Entendre"	4:20
Total length:		44:43

== Personnel ==
Credits adapted from liner notes.

- Matthew Cooper – performance, production, design
- Rafael Anton Irisarri – mastering
- Jeremy deVine – layout
- Jeannie Lynn Paske – cover ("They Had Not Heard Us Calling")

== Charts ==
Chart performance for Pianoworks
Chart (2019)	Peak position
UK Classical Artist Albums (OCC)	31
