= Eluvium (musician) =

American songwriter

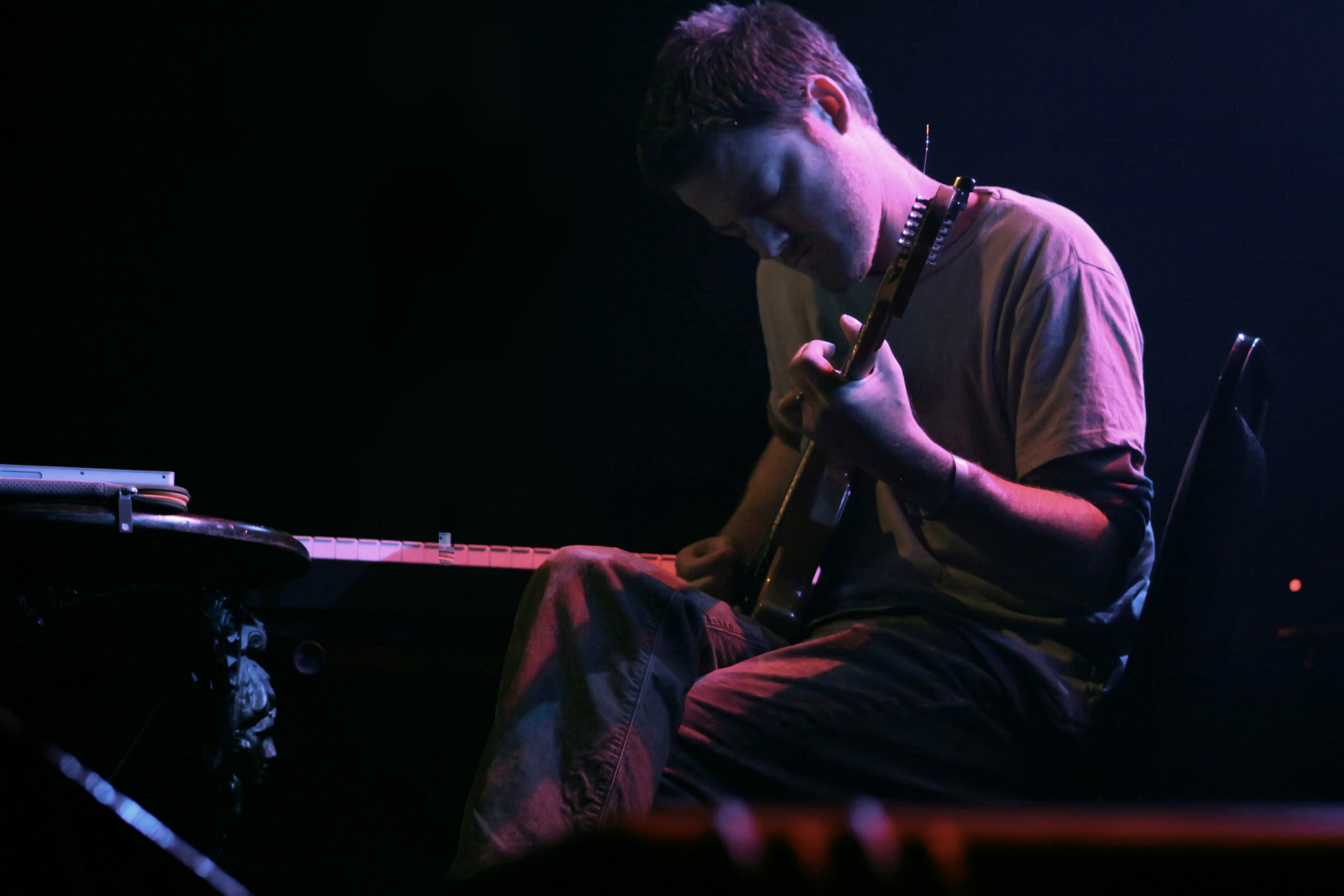
- Eluvium performing in Portland, Oregon

Background information
- Born: Matthew Robert Cooper; Tennessee, United States
- Origin: Portland, Oregon; Seattle, Washington
- Genres: Ambient; drone; minimalism; experimental; electronic; piano music
- Occupation: Musician
- Years active: 2003–present
- Labels: Temporary Residence Limited; Watership Sounds
- Member of: Inventions
- Website: www.eluvium.net

Matthew Robert Cooper, also known by the moniker Eluvium, is an American ambient recording artist who resides in Portland, Oregon. Cooper was born in Tennessee and raised in Louisville, Kentucky, before relocating to the Northwest. His albums often feature artwork and photographs by Jeannie Paske. He is signed to the record label Temporary Residence Limited.

== Career ==
Under the pseudonym Eluvium, Matthew Cooper released his debut album, Lambent Material (2003). It was followed by a solo piano album, An Accidental Memory in the Case of Death (2004). He then released Talk Amongst the Trees (2005), as well as Copia (2007).

Cooper has also teamed up with Charles Buckingham, with whom he has worked on the ambient video project titled Window Exchange, to produce the "unedited improvised basement minidisc recordings" of Concert Silence. In the fall of 2007, Concert Silence made 09.22.07 [2-3pm], a 51-minute, six part instrumental piece.

In 2008, Cooper announced he would release a "solo album" under the name Matthew Robert Cooper. Writing on the Temporary Residence message boards, Cooper explained the change "this is not far from something "eluvium" would release—but since I began writing them—I felt that they were somehow disconnected from eluvium—perhaps a different personality took shape—thus, the use of a different name - this work is very dear to me."

Miniatures was issued in 2008 on a limited vinyl release on the fledgling Portland label, Gaarden Records. The album was limited to 2,000 copies with the first 1,000 on colored vinyl.

In 2010, Infraction Records released "09.22.07 [2-3pm]" on limited edition vinyl and compact disc, alongside a new 12" E.P./CD titled "Rain Furniture".

Cooper scored fellow Portlander Matt McCormick's feature film debut Some Days Are Better Than Others, under Temporary Residence Limited. One of Cooper's original pieces can be heard in the trailer of the film. Another film scored by Cooper is For Thousands of Miles (2013) by Mike Ambs.

In 2012, Cooper began releasing electronic music under a new moniker, Martin Eden, named after the 1909 Jack London book. Cooper described the debut Martin Eden 7" as something that "may appeal to fans of early Aphex Twin stuff, or turn of the century electronic music."

Cooper has released an Eluvium 10" vinyl named "Pedals / Petals" in January 2013, for the Vinyl Films project by film director Cameron Crowe.

Cooper and Mark T. Smith of Explosions in the Sky teamed up to form a new act called Inventions, who released their self-titled first album, in 2014 through Temporary Residence. The duo released two more albums: Maze of Woods (2015) and Continuous Portrait (2020).

In 2016, Cooper released the album False Readings On. He also released Pianoworks (2019) and (Whirring Marvels In) Consensus Reality (2023).

== Discography ==
=== Studio albums ===
- Lambent Material (Temporary Residence Limited, 2003)
- An Accidental Memory in the Case of Death (Temporary Residence Limited, 2004)
- Talk Amongst the Trees (Temporary Residence Limited, 2005)
- Copia (Temporary Residence Limited, 2007)
- 09.22.07 [2-3pm] (with Charles Buckingham, as Concert Silence; self-released, 2007 / Infraction Records, 2010)
- Miniatures (as Matthew Robert Cooper; Gaarden Records, 2008)
- Similes (Temporary Residence Limited, 2010)
- Static Nocturne (Watership Sounds, 2010)
- Dedicate Function (as Martin Eden; Lefse Records, 2012)
- Nightmare Ending (Temporary Residence Limited, 2013)
- False Readings On (Temporary Residence Limited, 2016)
- Shuffle Drones (Temporary Residence Limited, 2017)
- Pianoworks (Temporary Residence Limited, 2019)
- Virga I (Temporary Residence Limited, 2020)
- Virga II (Temporary Residence Limited, 2021)
- (Whirring Marvels In) Consensus Reality (Temporary Residence Limited, 2023)
- Virga III (Temporary Residence Limited, 2026)

=== EPs ===
- Travels in Constants Vol. 20 (Temporary Residence Limited, 2005)
- When I Live by the Garden and the Sea (Temporary Residence Limited, 2006)
- Jesu/Eluvium (split with Jesu; Temporary Residence Limited, 2007)
- Leaves Eclipse the Light (Temporary Residence Limited, 2010)
- The Motion Makes Me Last (Temporary Residence Limited, 2010)
- Rain Furniture (with Charles Buckingham, as Concert Silence; Infraction Records, 2010)
- Catalin (2014)
- Wisdom for Debris (2014)

=== Singles ===
- "I Am Darkness, I Am Light" (with Peter Broderick, as MRC / PRB; Brian Records, 2011)
- "Lefse Records" (as Martin Eden; Lefse Records, 2012)
- "Pedals" / "Petals" (Vinyl Films, 2013)

=== Compilation albums ===
- Indecipherable Text (Sensory Projects, 2007)
- Life Through Bombardment (Temporary Residence Limited, 2009)
- Life Through Bombardment Vol. 2 (Temporary Residence Limited, 2016)

=== Soundtrack albums ===
- Some Days Are Better Than Others (as Matthew Robert Cooper; Temporary Residence Limited, 2011)

=== Remixes ===
- Pacific UV - Pacific UV EP (WARM Records, 2006; song: "L.A.P.D. vs N.Y.P.D. (Eluvium Remix)")
- Explosions in the Sky - All of a Sudden I Miss Everyone (Temporary Residence Limited, 2007; song: "So Long, Lonesome (Eluvium Mix)")
- The Sight Below - Murmur EP (Ghostly International, 2009; song: "No Place For Us (Eluvium Remix)")
- Balmorhea - All Is Wild, All Is Silent: Remixes (Western Vinyl, 2009; song: "Settler (Eluvium Remix)")
- The Black Heart Procession - Blood Bunny / Black Rabbit (Temporary Residence Limited, 2010; song: "Drugs (Remix by Eluvium)")

=== Compilation appearances ===
- Various artists - Thankful (Temporary Residence Limited, 2005; song: "Carousel")
- Various artists - Tempset - (Re)Mix Tape (Temporary Residence Limited, 2006)
- Various artists - Props Summer 2004 BMX Scene Report
- Various artists - Destroy Independent Music! (Temporary Residence Limited, 2007; song: "Prelude for Time Feelers")
- Various artists - Disquiet, Vol. 1 (Unseen Music, 2017; song: "Windmills")
- Various artists - For Ukraine (Volume 3) (Headphone Commute, 2022; song: "Broken Music" feat. Stanislav Teterevlev)

=== In other media ===
- Queer as Folk Season 5 Episode 9 end credits "Genius and the Thieves"
- Skins Season 2 Episode 8 (Jal) "Genius and the Thieves"
- Britney Spears - DVD: For the Record (FremantleMedia Enterprises, 2008; song: "Taken")
- Ireland's Grand Slam Glory 2009 (song: "Radio Ballet")

== See also ==
- List of ambient music artists
