= All of a Sudden I Miss Everyone =

Studio album by Explosions in the Sky
- Released: February 20, 2007
- Recorded: 2006
- Studio: Pachyderm in Cannon Falls, Minnesota
- Genre: Post-rock
- Length: 43:34
- Label: Temporary Residence Limited; TRR99
- Producer: Explosions in the Sky; John Congleton

Explosions in the Sky chronology
The Rescue (2005)	All of a Sudden I Miss Everyone (2007)	Take Care, Take Care, Take Care (2011)

All of a Sudden I Miss Everyone is the fifth studio album by American post-rock band Explosions in the Sky, released on February 20, 2007.

== Recording ==
The album was recorded over the course of summer 2006. On October 19, the band announced they had finished recording.

== Title and artwork ==
The album title itself is likely a reference to a line of dialogue spoken by the character of Mabel Longhetti (Gena Rowlands) in the 1974 John Cassavetes film A Woman Under the Influence. Having just seen her children taken off to school by their grandmother, Mabel states, "All of a sudden I miss everyone; I don't know why.".

The title of the song "The Birth and Death of the Day" appears in the 1952 novel East of Eden by John Steinbeck:

I remember that the Gabilan Mountains to the east of the valley were light grey mountains full of sun and loveliness and a kind of invitation, so that you wanted to climb into their warm foothills almost as you want to climb into the lap of a beloved mother. They were beckoning mountains with a brown grass love. The Santa Lucias stood up against the sky to the west and kept the valley from the open sea, and they were dark and brooding-unfriendly and dangerous. I always found in myself a dread of west and a love of east. Where I ever got such an idea I cannot say, unless it could be that the morning came over the peaks of the Gabilans and the night drifted back from the ridges of the Santa Lucias. It may be that the birth and death of the day had some part in my feeling about the two ranges of mountains.

The album artwork is by frequent collaborator Esteban Rey.

== Release ==
On November 3, 2006, All of a Sudden I Miss Everyone was announced for release. All of a Sudden I Miss Everyone was released on February 20, 2007, through Temporary Residence. A limited-edition version of the album came with a bonus CD of remixes of all 6 tracks on the album. The band appeared on Late Night with Conan O'Brien on February 20 and performed a shortened version of "Welcome, Ghosts". From late February to early April, the band went on a US tour with support from Eluvium. The band went on another US tour in October and November 2007 with the Smashing Pumpkins. They closed out the year with a four-date tour of Spain with Spoon and appearing at the Fun Fun Fun Fest in their hometown of Austin, Texas. They embarked on a tour of the UK in January 2008, which was followed by shows in Greece and Australia with Eluvium. In March and April 2008, the band embarked on a tour across the US with Lichens, followed by a European tour with Eluvium, which included appearances at the All Tomorrow's Parties festival in the UK. They appeared at the 2009 South by Southwest music conference. In May 2009, the band appeared at Sasquatch! Music Festival.

== Reception ==
Professional ratings
Aggregate scores
Source	Rating
Metacritic	80/100
Review scores
Source	Rating
AllMusic	4/5 stars
Drowned in Sound	8/10
Entertainment Weekly	A−
The Guardian	4/5 stars
Mojo	4/5 stars
The Observer	4/5 stars
Pitchfork	6.0/10
Rolling Stone	4/5 stars
Spin	4/5 stars
Tiny Mix Tapes	4/5 stars

It debuted on the Billboard 200 at number 76, selling 11,000 copies in its first week on the chart.

=== Popular culture ===
Internet vlogger and music reviewer Anthony Fantano has the album artwork tattooed to his left bicep.

== Track listing ==
No.	Title	Length
1.	"The Birth and Death of the Day"	7:49
2.	"Welcome, Ghosts"	5:43
3.	"It's Natural to Be Afraid"	13:27
4.	"What Do You Go Home To?"	4:59
5.	"Catastrophe and the Cure"	7:56
6.	"So Long, Lonesome"	3:40
Total length:		43:34

Disc two (bonus disc of remixes)
No.	Title	Length
1.	"The Birth and Death of the Day" (Jesu mix)	9:48
2.	"Welcome, Ghosts" (Adem mix)	6:24
3.	"It's Natural to Be Afraid" (The Paper Chase mix)	6:53
4.	"What Do You Go Home to?" (Mountains mix)	10:23
5.	"Catastrophe and the Cure" (Four Tet mix)	8:33
6.	"So Long, Lonesome" (Eluvium mix)	5:40
Total length:		91:15

== Charts ==
Chart performance for All of a Sudden I Miss Everyone
Chart (2007)	Peak position
Australian Hitseekers Albums (ARIA)	18
Belgian Albums (Ultratop Flanders)	43
Belgian Alternative Albums (Ultratop Flanders)	28
Canadian Albums (Nielsen SoundScan)	179
Irish Albums (IRMA)	81
Scottish Albums (OCC)	49
UK Albums (OCC)	58
UK Independent Albums (OCC)	2
US Billboard 200	76
US Independent Albums (Billboard)	2
US Indie Store Album Sales (Billboard)	3
US Top Rock Albums (Billboard)	21
