= Those Who Tell the Truth Shall Die, Those Who Tell the Truth Shall Live Forever =

Studio album by Explosions in the Sky
- Released: September 4, 2001
- Genre: Post-rock
- Length: 49:51
- Label: Temporary Residence Limited; TRR34
- Producer: Trevor Kampmann

Explosions in the Sky chronology
How Strange, Innocence (2000)	Those Who Tell the Truth Shall Die, Those Who Tell the Truth Shall Live Forever (2001)	The Earth Is Not a Cold Dead Place (2003)

Professional ratings
Review scores
Source	Rating
AllMusic	4/5 stars
LAS Magazine	Favorable
Pitchfork	8.9/10

Those Who Tell the Truth Shall Die, Those Who Tell the Truth Shall Live Forever is the second studio album by American post-rock band Explosions in the Sky, released on September 4, 2001 through Temporary Residence (the groups' first release on the label).

== Background and composition ==
The track "Have You Passed Through This Night?" is one of the few Explosions in the Sky songs to contain any words: a sample of the narration from the film The Thin Red Line.

The track "The Moon Is Down" was based on The Moon Is Down by author John Steinbeck.

The artwork for the album (created by David Logan) was inspired by the Angels of Mons.

== Legacy ==
The band garnered a small amount of media attention as the liner notes of this album contained a picture of an airplane and the text "This Plane Will Crash Tomorrow". A rumor circulated that the album was released on September 10, 2001, the day before the September 11, 2001 attacks, but this is not true. According to Amazon.com, the album was officially released September 4, 2001, exactly one week before the attacks. An interview with Stylus claims the album was available as early as August 24, 2001. Members of the band told Stylus that they had the artwork and idea for the liner notes for over a year before the attacks on the World Trade Center.

The track title "With Tired Eyes, Tired Minds, Tired Souls, We Slept" was used as an episode title for an episode of season three of the television show One Tree Hill.

== Track listing ==
No.	Title	Length
1.	"Greet Death"	7:19
2.	"Yasmin the Light"	7:03
3.	"The Moon Is Down"	10:02
4.	"Have You Passed Through This Night?"	7:19
5.	"A Poor Man's Memory"	6:04
6.	"With Tired Eyes, Tired Minds, Tired Souls, We Slept"	12:04
Total length:		49:51
