= Lone Survivor (soundtrack) =

Lone Survivor: Original Motion Picture Soundtrack

Film score by Explosions in the Sky and Steve Jablonsky
- Released: December 24, 2013
- Genres: Electronic; post-rock
- Length: 65:19
- Labels: Metropolis Movie Music; Back Lot Music
- Producers: Explosions in the Sky; Steve Jablonsky

Explosions in the Sky chronology
Prince Avalanche (2013)	Lone Survivor (2013)	Manglehorn (2014)

Steve Jablonsky chronology
Ender's Game (2013)	Lone Survivor (2013)	Transformers: Age of Extinction (2014)

Lone Survivor: Original Motion Picture Soundtrack is the soundtrack to the 2013 film Lone Survivor directed by Peter Berg. Featuring original score composed by the American post-rock band Explosions in the Sky and Steve Jablonsky. The soundtrack was released in digital and physical formats by Metropolis Movie Music and Back Lot Music on December 24, 2013, a day before the film's limited release.

== Development ==
Berg had used few cues from the band's music as temp tracks, and as he liked it, he then brought the band to contribute the music. He felt that the band had an "emotional, tender quality to the music when its aggressive". He did not want it to be overly aggressive, but haunting and emotional. Jablonsky could not work directly with the band as they were in Austin, Texas and him being in Los Angeles, so he virtually communicated with the band members and gave them directions on the score production and did their own things, trying not to have two totally different sounds for the score.

Explosions in the Sky composed over 65 percent of the film's scores, while Jablonsky composed the remaining pieces in the last reel, which consisted of a "traditional" score without using strings but praised the sounding as "wonderful" after supervising the final edit.

== Track listing ==
No.	Title	Writer(s)	Length
1.	"Warriors"	Explosions In The Sky	2:24
2.	"Waking Up"	Explosions In The Sky	4:50
3.	"Briefing"	Explosions In The Sky	3:18
4.	"Seal Credo / Landing"	Explosions In The Sky	4:00
5.	"Checkpoints"	Explosions In The Sky	4:56
6.	"The Goat Herders"	Steve Jablonsky	5:33
7.	"The Decision"	Explosions In The Sky	4:54
8.	"Set Them Free"	Explosions In The Sky	2:25
9.	"False Summit"	Explosions In The Sky	3:02
10.	"Murphy's Ridge"	Explosions In The Sky	5:41
11.	"47 Down"	Steve Jablonsky	2:23
12.	"Axe"	Explosions In The Sky	1:52
13.	"QRF En Route"	Explosions In The Sky	2:16
14.	"Hunted"	Explosions In The Sky	0:51
15.	"Gulab"	Explosions In The Sky	2:02
16.	"Near Beheading"	Explosions In The Sky	2:32
17.	"A Storm Is Coming"	Explosions In The Sky	2:07
18.	"Letter Received / Taliban Attacks"	Steve Jablonsky	3:51
19.	"Lone Survivor"	Steve Jablonsky	3:38
20.	"Never, Never, Never Give Up"	Explosions In The Sky	2:44
Total length:			65:19

== Reception ==
Michael Roffman of Consequence assigned a B+ score complimenting as an Explosions' album that "inject all the aural emotionalism that has glazed their iconic discography". He also felt that the score is spiritual sequel of the band's 2003 album The Earth Is Not a Cold Dead Place. Al Horner of NME rated two-and-a-half stars out of five, stating Jablonsky "gives a suitably filmic thrust to EITS's subtly stretched sound, perforated with machine gun drums and a steady swing between droning atmospherics and Mogwai-esque bluster". Peter Bradshaw of The Guardian called the music "unbearably clamorous and coercive, finishing with a clunkingly misjudged use of a cover version of David Bowie's 'Heroes'". Calum Marsh of The Atlantic felt that the band's post-rock music "plays out like an advertisement for the Marine Corps—an affectionate endorsement from Hollywood of the SEALs’ peerless brawn". Paul Shirley of JoBlo.com wrote that the composers "put forth a strong, toned-down score that elevates the material without overshadowing it".

== Personnel ==
Credits adapted from CD liner notes

- Music composed and arranged by – Explosions in the Sky, Steve Jablonsky
- Additional arrangements, acoustic guitar – Jacob Shea
- Drums – Jon Jablonsky
- Electric guitar – Steve Jablonsky
- Technical engineer – Lori Castro
- Executive in charge of music for Universal Pictures – Mike Knobloch
- Music business affairs for Universal Pictures – Philip M. Cohen
- Mixing – Jeff Biggers, Satoshi Mark Noguchi
- Mixing assistance – Brady McGowan
- Music editor – Bryan Lawson, Sam Zeines
- Sound designer – Clay Duncan
