= The Subconscious Art of Graffiti Removal =

- Directed by: Matt McCormick
- Produced by: Matt McCormick
- Starring: Miranda July
- Release date: 2001
- Running time: 16 minutes
- Country: United States
- Language: English

The Subconscious Art of Graffiti Removal (USA, 2001, 16 min) is an experimental documentary directed by filmmaker Matt McCormick, based on the ideas of Avalon Kalin and narrated by Miranda July that makes the tongue-in-cheek argument that municipal efforts by Portland, Oregon to mask and erase graffiti is an important new movement in modern art stemming from the repressed artistic desires of city workers.

The film screened at Sundance Film Festival and the Museum of Modern Art and received both critical and popular acclaim.

== See also ==
- Graffiti in Portland, Oregon
