= When I Live by the Garden and the Sea =

EP by Eluvium
- Released: August 22, 2006
- Genre: Ambient
- Length: 22:26
- Label: Temporary Residence

Eluvium chronology
Travels in Constants Vol. 20 (2005)	When I Live by the Garden and the Sea (2006)	Copia (2007)

Professional ratings
Review scores
Source	Rating
AllMusic	4/5 stars
Pitchfork Media	7.0/10

When I Live by the Garden and the Sea is an EP from the Portland, Oregon based, ambient musician Matthew Cooper, under the name Eluvium. The song "As I Drift Off" opened with an audio fragment from the 1989 film, The 'Burbs.

In February 2007, American webzine Somewhere Cold voted When I Live by the Garden and the Sea EP of the Year on their 2006 Somewhere Cold Awards Hall of Fame.

== Track listing ==
1. "I Will Not Forget That I Have Forgotten" – 5:20
2. "As I Drift Off" – 3:47
3. "All the Sails" – 5:45
4. "When I Live by the Garden and the Sea" – 7:32
