= Inventions (Inventions album) =

Studio album by Inventions
- Released: April 1, 2014
- Length: 44:20
- Label: Temporary Residence
- Producer: Matthew Cooper; Mark T. Smith

Inventions chronology
Inventions (2014)	Maze of Woods (2015)

Inventions is the debut studio album by Inventions, a collaborative project between Matthew Cooper and Mark T. Smith. It was released on April 1, 2014, through Temporary Residence Limited. It received generally favorable reviews from critics.

== Background ==
Inventions consists of Matthew Cooper, also known as Eluvium, and Mark T. Smith of Explosions in the Sky. They became friends when Eluvium and Explosions in the Sky toured together. They first collaborated on the song "Envenom Mettle" for Eluvium's album Nightmare Ending (2013). Inventions is the duo's debut studio album.

== Critical reception ==
Professional ratings
Aggregate scores
Source	Rating
Metacritic	72/100
Review scores
Source	Rating
AllMusic	3.5/5 stars
Consequence	C+
The Line of Best Fit	8/10
Pitchfork	7.5/10
PopMatters	7/10 stars
The Skinny	2/5 stars
Spin	7/10

According to the review aggregator Metacritic, Inventions received "generally favorable reviews" based on a weighted average score of 72 out of 100 from 9 critic scores.

Benjamin Hedge Olson of PopMatters stated, "Inventions places Cooper's lush, electronic ambience alongside Explosions in the Sky's sense of space and tension." He added, "The results are quite satisfying and not too syrupy." Garrett Kamps of Spin commented that "Inventions works for all the reasons post-rock ambient experimental noise-scape music is supposed to work." Mark Richardson of Pitchfork stated, "Lack of variety aside, Eluvium and Smith couldn't be a better match, and the record as a whole possesses an uncommon beauty." John Skibeat of The Line of Best Fit described Inventions as "an instrumental album of the most beautiful, minimalist, ambient rock music that resonates at a completely different frequency from all that has gone before."

=== Accolades ===
Year-end lists for Inventions
Publication	List	Rank	Ref.
Drowned in Sound	50 Favourite Albums of 2014	40	
MusicOMH	Top 100 Albums of 2014	60	

== Track listing ==
All tracks are written by Matthew Cooper and Mark T. Smith.

Inventions track listing
No.	Title	Length
1.	"Echo Tropism"	2:53
2.	"Flood Poems"	7:28
3.	"Entity"	6:33
4.	"Luminous Insects"	4:47
5.	"Peacable Child"	7:29
6.	"Sun Locations / Sun Coda"	6:01
7.	"Recipient"	5:10
8.	"Psychic Automation"	3:59
Total length:		44:20

Notes

- "Luminous Insects" contains a sample from "Young Prayer Untitled 1" by Noah Lennox.

== Personnel ==
Credits adapted from liner notes.

- Matthew Cooper – performance, production
- Mark T. Smith – performance, production
- Michael James – voice (7)
- Roger Seibel – mastering
- Jeremy deVine – layout, design
- NASA – cover photography source
- Kim Høltermand – inside photography
- Esteban Rey – illustration

== Charts ==
Chart performance for Inventions
Chart (2014)	Peak position
US Heatseekers Albums (Billboard)	22
