= The Rescue (Explosions in the Sky album) =

Studio album by Explosions in the Sky
- Released: October 11, 2005
- Recorded: 2005
- Genre: Post-rock
- Length: 32:48
- Label: Temporary Residence Limited; TRR13 / TIC21
- Producer: Explosions in the Sky

Explosions in the Sky chronology
Friday Night Lights (2004)	The Rescue (2005)	All of a Sudden I Miss Everyone (2007)

Professional ratings
Review scores
Source	Rating
Pitchfork	7.2/10
Stylus Magazine	B

The Rescue is the fourth studio album by American post-rock band Explosions in the Sky, released on October 11, 2005. Written, recorded and mastered in two weeks in band member Michael James's house in Austin, Texas, The Rescue is a concept album inspired by an experience the band had while touring.

== Overview ==
The album was recorded and mixed in just two weeks. The band wrote no new material for this album prior, and then spent eight straight days writing and finishing a song each day. The rest of the two weeks was spent mixing. The album is Volume 21 in the Travels in Constants series and was originally only available for purchase via mail order and at the band's shows. Due to the demand of fans who could not get hold of the album, The Rescue used to be offered as a free download at the band's official website at one time.

The Rescue was inspired by a time the band was on tour and its van broke down on the road. The members had to wait eight days (hence each track title) for the transmission to be replaced in the van (as described in dialogue during the song "Day Three"), and they went flat broke after the payment. They had to spend those eight days in the attic of someone kind enough to let them stay. They described "Day Eight" as "a goodbye".

The album cover is a painting by Walter Hunt called "Rescue of a Lost Friend".

== Track listing ==
No.	Title	Length
1.	"Day One"	4:32
2.	"Day Two"	3:47
3.	"Day Three"	4:34
4.	"Day Four"	3:00
5.	"Day Five"	4:35
6.	"Day Six"	5:22
7.	"Day Seven"	4:23
8.	"Day Eight"	2:35
Total length:		32:48
