= Mook (Portland graffiti artist) =

Portland graffiti artist

- A Mook tag on a building in the Old Town Chinatown neighborhood of Portland
- Born: Marcus Edward Gunther; 1987 or 1988 (age 37–38)
- Movement: Graffiti

Mook is the pseudonymous tag of Marcus Edward Gunther. He was known to have tagged over one hundred locations with the word Mook in the late 2010s and was sentenced to two years in prison in February 2019 for his repeated acts of spraying graffiti without permission.

== Graffiti ==
The Oregon Department of Transportation and Portland Police Bureau began an investigation on June 29, 2018, after the letters "M-O-O-K" were spray painted onto newly installed electronic signs hanging over an Interstate 84 overpass in Northeast Portland. Police opened a second investigation on September 6, 2018, after the same tag was found on a U-Store self storage facility elsewhere in the city. On September 13, 2018, Portland resident Marcus Edward Gunther was arrested in connection with the two incidents. Gunther was arrested at the corner of Southwest 13th Ave and Southwest Main Street. He was lodged at the Multnomah County Jail on charges of Criminal mischief in the Second Degree (two counts), Criminal Mischief in the First Degree, and a probation violation. Gunther was a prolific graffiti vandal, leaving over 100 documented tags around the city. The Columbian reported that Gunther's graffiti tags have also been found in the nearby city of Vancouver, Washington.

== Legal issues ==
On February 8, 2019, Gunther pleaded guilty to four counts of first-degree criminal mischief and one count of second-degree criminal mischief. He was sentenced to two years in prison and will be required to pay a restitution of about $30,000 and enroll in five years of post-release drug treatment for his heroin and methamphetamine habits. As of September 14, 2018, Gunther has had one felony conviction, three misdemeanor convictions and three parole violations, including possession of heroin and DWI. According to Portland Tribune, He was charged with second-degree theft earlier in September 2018, and faced 10 charges for second-degree theft and criminal mischief in August 2018.

On February 11, 2019, Multnomah County District Attorney's Office announced:

30-year-old Marcus Gunther changed his plea and was sentenced for causing nearly $30,000 in damages by illegally spray-painting on private property. "This is a sentence that holds Marcus Gunther accountable for his repeated acts of spraying graffiti without permission,” Multnomah County Senior Deputy District Attorney Nathan Vasquez, who prosecuted this case, said after sentencing. “It also provides Mr. Gunther an opportunity at treatment, which will benefit him and our entire community.” Gunther was arrested September 13, 2018 by members of the Portland Police Bureau. The change of plea and sentencing hearing occurred on February 8, 2019. Gunther was responsible for numerous acts of vandalism throughout Portland, Oregon. Primarily, he was spray-painting his "tag" on private property, which included Oregon Department of Transportation (ODOT) property.

== See also ==
- Graffiti in Portland, Oregon
