= Friday Night =

Friday Night may refer to:

- Friday, evening

Friday Night may also refer to:

== Art, entertainment, and media ==
=== Film ===
- Friday Night (1987 film) (Petak vecher), a Bulgarian film by Lyudmil Kirkov
- Friday Night (2000 film) (V petek zvecer), a Slovenian film
- Friday Night (2002 film) (Vendredi soir), a French film by Claire Denis

=== Music ===
- Friday Night (album), a 2016 album by Will Butler
- "Friday Night" (Arabesque song), a song by Arabesque from 1978
- "Friday Night" (Lady Antebellum song), was also recorded by Eric Paslay
- "Friday Night" (Burak Yeter song), a 2019 song by Burak Yeter
- "Friday Night", a song by Allister from Dead Ends and Girlfriends
- "Friday Night", a song by Beck Martin from I Love My Life
- "Friday Night", a song by the Click Five from Greetings from Imrie House
- "Friday Night", a song by The Damned Things from Ironiclast, 2010
- "Friday Night", a song by the Darkness from Permission to Land
- "Friday Night", a song by Emil Bulls from The Southern Comfort
- "Friday Night", a song by Energy from Here I Am, 2024
- "Friday Night", a song by House of Heroes from House of Heroes
- "Friday Night", a song by Lily Allen from Alright, Still
- "Friday Night", a song by Loverboy from Lovin' Every Minute of It
- "Friday Night", a song by McFly from the single "Sorry's Not Good Enough"/"Friday Night"
- "Friday Night", a song by Redgum from Frontline
- "Friday Night", a song by Roy Orbison from Laminar Flow
- "Friday Night", a song by S Club 7 from S Club
- "Friday Night", a song by Slick Shoes from Slick Shoes
- "Friday Night", a song by Twenty 4 Seven
- "Friday Night", a song by Timothy B. Schmit from Expando
- "Friday Night", a song from the TV series The Kids from "Fame"
- "Friday Night", a song by David Latour, remixed by Madeon
- "Friday Night", a song by Dennis Wilson from Pacific Ocean Blue
- "Friday Night", a song by Vandenberg from Heading for a Storm
- "Friday Night", a song by XO-IQ, featured in the television series Make It Pop
- "Last Friday Night", a song by Katy Perry

=== Television ===
- Friday Night with Jonathan Ross, a British TV chat show
- Friday Night with Niall Paterson, a news programme on Sky News
- Friday Night Videos or simply Friday Night, an American music video show
- Friday Night! with Ralph Benmergui, a Canadian TV variety show
- "Friday Night", an episode of Beavis and Butt-head
- "Friday Night", an episode of Degrassi: The Next Generation

== See also ==
- Black Friday (disambiguation)
- Friday Night Lights (disambiguation)
- Good Friday
- Thank God It's Friday (disambiguation)
