= Travels in Constants Vol. 20 =

Studio album by Eluvium
- Released: September 30, 2005
- Genre: Ambient
- Length: 33:19
- Label: Temporary Residence

Eluvium chronology
Talk Amongst the Trees (2005)	Travels in Constants Vol. 20 (2005)	When I Live by the Garden and the Sea (2006)

Travels in Constants Vol. 20 is Matthew Cooper's contribution to the mail order only Travels in Constants series from label Temporary Residence Limited. Other artists in the series include By Water, Bonnevill, Tarentel, Drona Parva, Papa M, Sonna, Bonnie 'Prince' Billy, Paul Newman, Low, Cerberus Shoal, Rumah Sakit, Mogwai, Appendix Out, Songs:Ohia, Sybarite, At Right Angles, Kilowatthours, Colophon, The Drift and Explosions in the Sky.

== Title ==
The title of the album is taken from an entry in Gustavus Hindman Miller's 1901 book, "Ten Thousand Dreams Interpreted, Or, What's In A Dream"

The entry for evening is reproduced in the album's sparse liner notes:

To see stars shining out clear, denotes present distress, but brighter fortune is behind your trouble.

== Track listing ==
1. "Behind Your Trouble" - 33:19

== Album credits ==
guitars, loops, amps, bells, whistles, trains, engines, fans, silence, keyboards, papers, gears, marbles, doors, etc...played by Matthew Cooper & Eric Macey (atticus played by atticus)

photography by Jeannie Paske
