= Ender's Game (soundtrack) =

Film score by Steve Jablonsky
- Released: October 22, 2013
- Venue: 2013
- Studio: Abbey Road Studios, London
- Genre: Film score
- Length: 70:40
- Label: Varèse Sarabande
- Producer: Steve Jablonsky; Alex Gibson

Steve Jablonsky chronology
Pain & Gain (2013)	Ender's Game (2013)	Lone Survivor (2013)

Ender's Game (Original Motion Picture Score) is the film score soundtrack to the 2013 film Ender's Game, directed by Gavin Hood and based on the 1985 novel by Orson Scott Card. The score is composed by Steve Jablonsky, who replaced the original composer James Horner. Varèse Sarabande released the soundtrack exclusively through iTunes on October 22, 2013, and in CDs and digital download on October 29.

== Development ==
In January 2013, it was announced that James Horner would compose the musical score for Ender's Game. However, by that May, Steve Jablonsky was hired to compose the musical score replacing Horner. Though Jablonsky was unfamiliar with the 1985 novel, once he was brought onboard, he listened to the one-line narration by Hood and found it to be compelling, called it as "more of a drama wrapped up in a sci-fi film". Like his prior films, he would compose specific themes from the ideas he provided from the discussions with the directors and sketch rough outline of the musical ideas. From the onset, he did not want to focus on the action sequences or emphasize the grandeur with the film's music and produce over-blown sound effects. Instead, he wanted to find simple thematic ideas to play Ender's emotions and his development throughout the film.

Jablonsky developed orchestral and choral compositions to highlight the battle room sequences—set in a glass-paned dome where Ender and his troops trained for combat in zero gravity—as the choir gives "an ethereal, floaty feeling to the zero-gravity scenes in the film". The dome's setting was also used for playful sequences, where he composed a lighter piece of music for the sequence where the kids play in the dome, while the rest of the film's score was kept to be very dark and moody. As Ender being an isolated person, he wrote a simple melody for solo cello; the filmmakers liked those piece as it was very fitting for Ender's character.

== Reception ==
Jonathan Broxton, reviewing for Movie Music UK, wrote: "Ender’s Game is the most satisfying music Steve Jablonsky has penned for several years, in terms of the design and structure of the score, the intelligent application of themes, and some straightforward contemporary action, and is worth giving a second look to for those who might have otherwise automatically dismissed it." Filmtracks wrote "Like the Transformers scores, there is a guilty pleasure suite to be compiled from Jablonsky's generic output for Ender's Game, perhaps even fifteen minutes of tonally dumb but tasty red meat for avid Remote Control collectors. It's significantly better than Battleship, but then again, damn near everything is, even the concurrent Remote Control disaster for Captain Phillips."

James Christopher Monger of AllMusic called it as "a thrilling mix of old-school and new that complements the film's eye-popping special effects and traditional narrative structure." Movie Music Mania summarized "It may not be Jablonsky's worst, but Ender’s Game is in so many ways a marvelous opportunity squandered." Tim Grierson of Screen International called it as a "booming, solemn score". Peter Debruge of Variety wrote "Steven Jablonsky’s mostly-digital score, which sounds like Daft Punk plus strings, cements the film’s debt to that recent Disney reboot". Charlie Schmidlin of IndieWire called it as a "serviceable electronic score". Angela Watercutter of Wired wrote "What Ender’s Game has lost in heart, it attempts to make up for with lushly filmed battles to fill the void, scored by Transformers composer Steve Jablonsky."

== Track listing ==
No.	Title	Length
1.	"Ender's War"	3:27
2.	"Stay Down"	2:42
3.	"Battle School"	1:56
4.	"Move It Launchies"	0:56
5.	"The Battle Room"	3:03
6.	"Mind Game Part 1"	2:24
7.	"Salamander Battle"	3:34
8.	"Mind Game Part 2"	3:55
9.	"Dragon Army"	2:24
10.	"Dragons Win"	3:53
11.	"Bonzo"	1:37
12.	"Ender Quits"	6:22
13.	"Mazer Rackham"	2:34
14.	"Enemy Planet"	3:50
15.	"Command School"	2:42
16.	"Graduation Day"	1:28
17.	"Final Test"	6:02
18.	"Game Over"	2:36
19.	"The Way We Win Matters"	6:14
20.	"Ender's Promise"	5:09
21.	"Commander"	3:33
Total length:		70:40

== Credits and personnel ==
Credits adapted from liner notes

- Composer – Steve Jablonsky
- Producer – Alex Gibson, Steve Jablonsky
- Technical score engineer – Lori Castro
- Assistant engineer – Jack Sugden, Matt Mysko
- Arrangements – Jacob Shea
- Recording – Peter Cobbin
- Digital recordist – John Barrett
- Mixing – Jeff Biggers
- Mastering – Patricia Sullivan
- Music consultant – Linda Cohen
- Music supervisor – Chris Brown
- Music co-ordinator – Nikki Triplett, Ryan Svendsen
- Executive producer – Robert Townson
- Copyist – Junko Tamura
- Music librarian – Jill Streater

Orchestra

- Orchestrators – Alain Mayrand, Larry Rench, Philip Klein
- Supervising orchestrator – Penka Kouneva
- Booth reader – Alastair King
- Orchestra leader – Everton Nelson
- Conductor – Gavin Greenaway
- Orchestra contractor – Isobel Griffiths
- Assistant orchestra contractor – Jo Changer
- Choir – Metro Voices
- Choirmaster – Jenny O'Grady

Soloists

- Cello – Caroline Dale
- Violin – Everton Nelson
