= Portland Documentary and Experimental Film Festival =

Oregon film festival

The Portland Documentary and eXperimental Film Festival, or PDX Fest, is a five-day event that showcases non-narrative film and video from Portland, Oregon, United States and around the world. The film festival was started in 2001 by filmmaker Matt McCormick.

The Portland Documentary and eXperimental Film Festival is also home of the Peripheral Produce Invitational, which makes an annual award to experimental film.

== See also ==
- Culture of Portland, Oregon
- List of film festivals in the United States
