= Similes (album) =

Studio album by Eluvium
- Released: February 23, 2010
- Genre: Ambient
- Length: 42:35
- Label: Temporary Residence Limited

Eluvium chronology
| Copia (2007) | Similes (2010) | Leaves Eclipse the Light (2010) |

Professional ratings
Review scores
| Source | Rating |
|---|---|
| AllMusic | 4.5/5 stars |
| Pitchfork Media | 6.9/10 |

Similes is the fifth album from Portland, Oregon ambient musician Matthew Cooper, under the name Eluvium. The album features Cooper's first vocal performances and percussion, and is the first album to have a verse-chorus form in some of its tracks. The front cover is an artwork created by his wife, Jeannie Paske, who painted artworks for most of his other albums.

== Tour ==
Eluvium toured across North America in the end of April and throughout May 2010, for the first time performing as a trio - featuring Eric Masey (who joined him on the Travels in Constants disc) and Charles Buckingham (with whom Eluvium made the Concert Silence project), "both on keyboard duties as well as samples and live manipulation". At the tour Eluvium performed 5 tracks from Similes (only those which feature vocals) and 4 tracks from his previous albums.

== Track listing ==
1. "Leaves Eclipse the Light" – 5:42
2. "The Motion Makes Me Last" – 5:24
3. "In Culmination" – 2:54
4. "Weird Creatures" – 4:31
5. "Nightmare 5" – 3:26
6. "Making Up Minds" – 6:28
7. "Bending Dream" – 2:40
8. "Cease to Know" – 11:16
