= Talk Amongst the Trees =

Studio album by Eluvium
- Released: March 1, 2005
- Genre: Ambient
- Length: 54:36
- Label: Temporary Residence

Eluvium chronology
An Accidental Memory in the Case of Death (2004)	Talk Amongst the Trees (2005)	Travels in Constants Vol. 20 (2005)

Talk Amongst the Trees is the third studio album by American ambient musician Matthew Cooper under the name Eluvium. It was released on March 1, 2005, through Temporary Residence Limited. In 2016, Pitchfork named it the 43rd best ambient album of all time.

== Critical reception ==
Professional ratings
Review scores
Source	Rating
AllMusic	4.5/5 stars
Cokemachineglow	85%
Pitchfork	7.9/10
PopMatters	6/10 stars
Stylus Magazine	A
Tiny Mix Tapes	4.5/5 stars

Dave Segal of XLR8R commented that Talk Amongst the Trees "conjures an expansive pathos with a minimalist's economy of means." Jean-Pierre of Tiny Mix Tapes praised Eluvium's "mastery of melodies and loops" on the album. Rob Theakston of AllMusic commented that "This is not just a release for post-rock, experimental, ambient or electronic fans." He added, "This is a release for everyone who simply likes honest, well-crafted music." Tim O'Neil of PopMatters stated, "If you entertain any affection at all for the airy, numinous realms of abstract sound, this might just be your new favorite record."

=== Accolades ===
Accolades for Talk Amongst the Trees
Publication	List	Rank	Ref.
Pitchfork	The 50 Best Ambient Albums of All Time	43	
Stylus Magazine	Top 50 Albums of 2005	27	

== Track listing ==
All tracks are written by Matthew Cooper.

Talk Amongst the Trees track listing
No.	Title	Length
1.	"New Animals from the Air"	10:47
2.	"Show Us Our Homes"	4:46
3.	"Area 41"	0:59
4.	"Everything to Come"	5:40
5.	"Calm of the Cast-Light Cloud"	5:30
6.	"Taken"	16:56
7.	"We Say Goodbye to Ourselves"	2:09
8.	"One"	7:44
Total length:		54:36

== Personnel ==
Credits adapted from liner notes.

- Matthew Cooper – performance, photography
- Jeremy Devine – layout, design
- Quint Buchholz – cover painting ("November")
- Jeannie Lynn Paske – photography
- Philip Cooper – poems
