= An Accidental Memory in the Case of Death =

Studio album by Eluvium
- Released: May 4, 2004
- Recorded: September 2003
- Studio: The Northwest Academy (Portland, Oregon)
- Genres: Ambient; piano music
- Length: 26:30
- Label: Temporary Residence

Eluvium chronology
Lambent Material (2003)	An Accidental Memory in the Case of Death (2004)	Talk Amongst the Trees (2005)

An Accidental Memory in the Case of Death is the second studio album by American ambient musician Matthew Cooper under the name Eluvium. It was released on May 4, 2004, through Temporary Residence Limited.

== Background ==
An Accidental Memory in the Case of Death is a follow-up to Eluvium's debut studio album, Lambent Material (2003). It consists of seven solo piano pieces. Recording of the album took place in September 2003, at The Northwest Academy in Portland, Oregon. It was recorded in one take and was completed in two hours.

== Critical reception ==
Professional ratings
Review scores
Source	Rating
AllMusic	4/5 stars
Cokemachineglow	71%
Tiny Mix Tapes	4/5 stars

Michael Cramer of Dusted Magazine commented that "Much of the music on Accidental Memory suggests that the carefully considered beauty of a perfect melody may be no less 'human' or emotive than impassioned improvisational wailing." He added, "Eluvium's compositions keep romantic exuberance and excess at arm's length, but sacrifice none of music's potential for emotional expression." Rob Theakston of AllMusic stated, "Equally beautiful and accessible, this could likely be a disappointing follow-up for those expecting more of what Lambent Material had to offer." He added, "But if you listen patiently, you will be led to a conclusion that will leave you wanting more than its painfully short 26-minute running time has to offer." Scott Reid of Cokemachineglow stated, "The pieces are uniformly gorgeous and relaxing but never really develop, and since the piano is the sole instrument on the entire record, the abundance of repetition can become especially monotonous and trying, even with a handful of impressive melodies thrown in along the way."

== Track listing ==
An Accidental Memory in the Case of Death track listing
No.	Title	Length
1.	"An Accidental Memory"	1:12
2.	"Genius and the Thieves"	2:26
3.	"Perfect Neglect in a Field of Statues"	5:25
4.	"Nepenthe"	3:42
5.	"In a Sense"	1:45
6.	"The Well-Meaning Professor"	7:34
7.	"An Accidental Memory in the Case of Death"	4:26
Total length:		26:30

== Personnel ==
Credits adapted from liner notes.

- Matthew Cooper – solo piano
- Nathan Stanton – recording
- Denis Blackham – mastering
- Jeremy deVine – design, layout
- Jeannie Lynn Paske – artwork
- Douglas Coupland – liner notes ("Life After God")
