= Maze of Woods =

Studio album by Inventions
- Released: March 17, 2015
- Length: 40:08
- Label: Temporary Residence; Bella Union
- Producer: Matthew Cooper; Mark T. Smith

Inventions chronology
Inventions (2014)	Maze of Woods (2015)	Blanket Waves (2015)

Maze of Woods is the second studio album by Inventions, a collaborative project between Matthew Cooper and Mark T. Smith. It was released on March 17, 2015, through Temporary Residence Limited and Bella Union. It received generally favorable reviews from critics.

== Background ==
Inventions consists of Matthew Cooper, also known as Eluvium, and Mark T. Smith of Explosions in the Sky. Maze of Woods is a follow-up to the duo's debut studio album, Inventions (2014). It is inspired by the final paragraph of Denis Johnson's novella Train Dreams. Music videos were released for the songs "Springworlds" and "Peregrine".

Maze of Woods was released on March 17, 2015, through Temporary Residence Limited in the United States, and through Bella Union in the United Kingdom. The digital edition of the album comes with a three-song EP containing remixes of the album's songs by The Field, Leyland Kirby, and A Winged Victory for the Sullen.

== Critical reception ==
Professional ratings
Aggregate scores
Source	Rating
Metacritic	68/100
Review scores
Source	Rating
AllMusic	4/5 stars
DIY	3/5 stars
Drowned in Sound	8/10
Exclaim!	5/10
The Line of Best Fit	6.5/10
MusicOMH	3.5/5 stars
Pitchfork	7.6/10
The 405	8/10

According to the review aggregator Metacritic, Maze of Woods received "generally favorable reviews" based on a weighted average score of 68 out of 100 from 9 critic scores.

Brian Howe of Pitchfork stated, "For all of its dreamy moods, Maze of Woods frequently edges toward electronic pop, and is more expansive and dynamic than the debut." Fred Thomas of AllMusic described the album as "an enthusiastic and farther-reaching second chapter to their quickly developing sound." Max Raymond of MusicOMH commented that "It certainly feels like a mellower, more wistful album than its predecessor, even if it isn't quite compelling for the full duration of its running time."

James Appleyard of The Line of Best Fit stated, "On Maze of Woods, Inventions have genuinely tried to sonically challenge themselves and in the process manage to create moments of genuine beauty." He added, "The artistry is unquestionable, but ultimately the indulgence of the album's creation seems to have fogged Invention's original vision." Scott Simpson of Exclaim! commented that "There's very little on offer to ground the listener here, which makes Maze of Woods a challenging collection; it's the aural equivalent of a 90-minute movie that feels like a 3-hour watch."

== Track listing ==
All tracks are written by Matthew Cooper and Mark T. Smith.

Maze of Woods track listing
No.	Title	Length
1.	"Escapers"	3:45
2.	"Springworlds"	4:53
3.	"Peregrine"	6:00
4.	"Slow Breathing Circuit"	4:06
5.	"A Wind from All Directions"	5:08
6.	"Wolfkids"	4:23
7.	"Moanmusic"	5:27
8.	"Feeling the Sun Thru the Earth at Night"	6:23
Total length:		40:08

Digital edition bonus tracks
No.	Title	Length
9.	"Peregrine" (The Field remix)	9:17
10.	"Springworlds" (Leyland Kirby remix)	4:54
11.	"Slow Breathing Circuit" (A Winged Victory for the Sullen remix)	6:07
Total length:		60:26

Notes

- "Peregrine" contains a sample from "Teasing Song" by Elisabeth Tittusen.
- "Peregrine" also contains a sample from "Singing Game" by Kûitse Andersen and Malene Andersen.
- "Feeling the Sun Thru the Earth at Night" is inspired by Tao Line.

== Personnel ==
Credits adapted from liner notes.

- Matthew Cooper – performance, production, art direction
- Mark T. Smith – performance, production, art direction
- Noel Summerville – mastering
- Jeremy deVine – layout
- C&GS Season's Report Scaife 1924 – photography
- C&GS Season's Report Heck 1920–1945 – photography
