= Graffiti in Portland, Oregon =

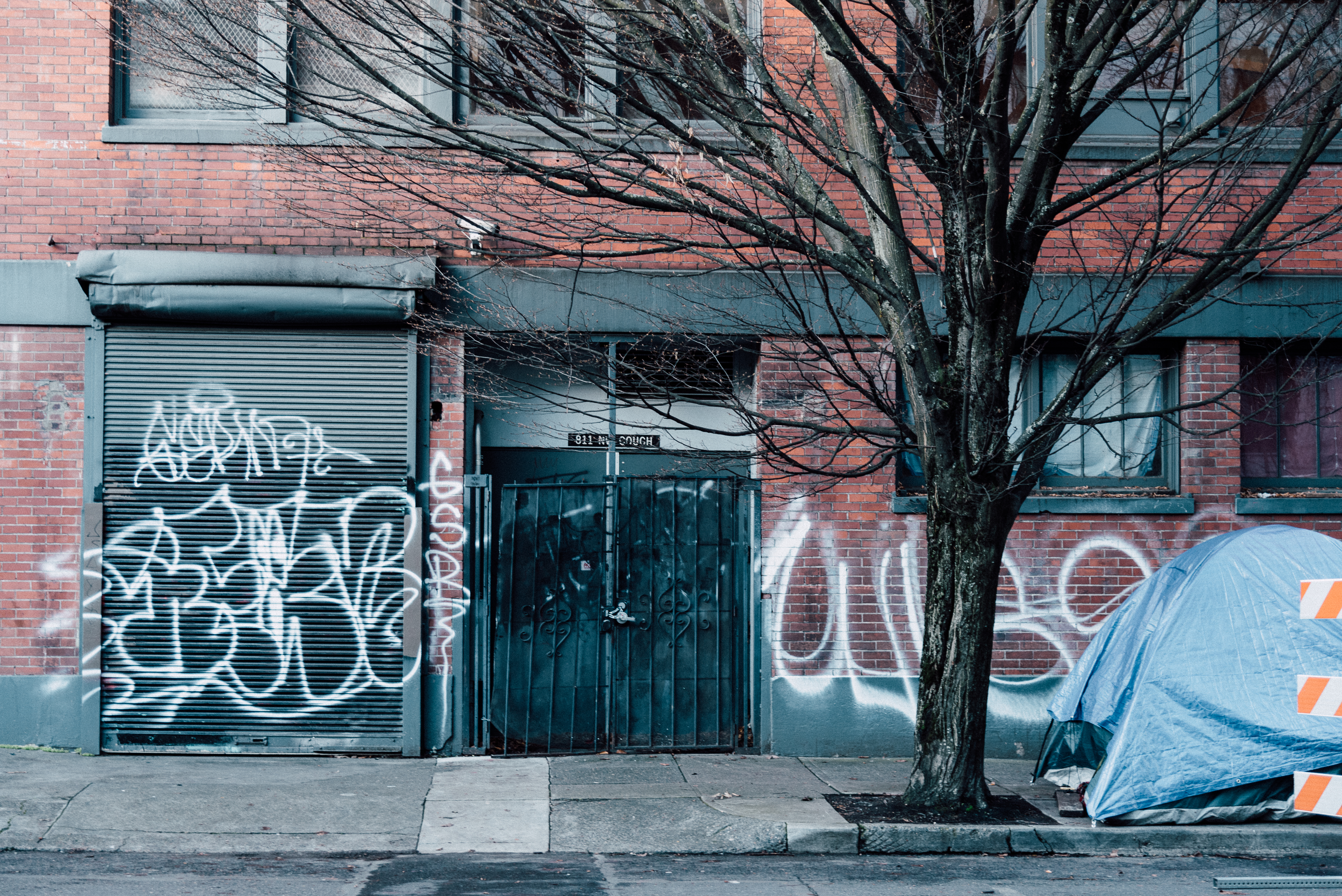
Graffiti in Portland, Oregon, 2010

Graffiti is a cause of disagreement among residents of Portland, Oregon. Residents can report graffiti and request removal. In 2023, a poll conducted by The Oregonian showed 61 percent of Portland voters considered graffiti a "big" problem.

== Prevalence ==
Portland saw a marked rise in graffiti during the COVID-19 pandemic. The city has also seen "tagger tourism", or people visiting for the purpose of spray painting illegally. According to KPTV, "Portland's location on the I-5 corridor means that transient taggers often stop off to leave their mark. It’s an underground culture of dedicated wall writers leaving their mark on a city, that’s eager to buff it out."

== Removal efforts ==
Grafitti on the Fountain for Company H, 2020

The graffiti increase during the pandemic prompted city council to strengthen removal efforts.

In 2021, the Oregon Department of Transportation (ODOT) hired an outside contractor to remove graffiti along three highways. As of 2022, ODOT set aside $2 million was set aside for graffiti and litter clean up. In late 2022, the city deployed "preventative graffiti".

ODOT's $2 million in funding ran out in 2023. In 2024, the Oregon legislature allocated $4 million for ODOT for addressing graffiti. Synthetic ivy has been used on walls in an attempt to deter graffiti.

The city requires building owners to remove graffiti within 10 days or risk a fine. In practice, the code is not being enforced against property owners. In 2024, commissioner Rene Gonzalez proposed "meaningful" penalties for graffiti vandals. His proposal did not receive a vote before he left office.

Police have also arrested major offenders. In 2024, police raided the house of a suspected graffiti vandal who was featured on a YouTube series. The same man was later arrested. Another man received a 2.5 year prison sentence.

Jacob Abel Ramos who tagged "BIER" and was part of the tagging crew "KYT" which stands for "Kill Your Television". was sentenced to prison for four years in January 2026.

A female graffiti vandal Shelaleh Rostami who is responsible for tagging "THULA, "LADY THUJA" and "LADY T." in numerous places were sentenced to two years in prison in August 2026 on seven criminal mischief charges. Rostami associated with Ramos who tagged "BIER".

== See also ==
- Culture of Portland, Oregon
- Mook (Portland graffiti artist)
- The Subconscious Art of Graffiti Removal (2001)
