= Take Care, Take Care, Take Care =

Studio album by Explosions in the Sky
- Released: April 18, 2011
- Recorded: Sonic Ranch, El Paso, Texas
- Genre: Post-rock
- Length: 46:05
- Labels: Temporary Residence Limited; TRR199
- Producer: John Congleton

Explosions in the Sky chronology
All of a Sudden I Miss Everyone (2007)	Take Care, Take Care, Take Care (2011)	The Wilderness (2016)

Take Care, Take Care, Take Care is the sixth studio album by American post-rock band Explosions in the Sky, released on April 18, 2011, in the UK, April 25, 2011, in Europe, and April 26, 2011, in the US.

== Reception ==
Professional ratings
Aggregate scores
Source	Rating
AnyDecentMusic?	7.6/10
Metacritic	77/100
Review scores
Source	Rating
AllMusic	4.5/5 stars
The A.V. Club	B−
Clash	8/10
MusicOMH	4.5/5 stars
NME	8/10
Pitchfork	7.2/10
PopMatters	8/10
Rock Sound	9/10
Slant Magazine	3/5 stars
Tiny Mix Tapes	4.5/5 stars

The album mostly received positive reviews from critics, peaking at #81 on the iTunes Store. Metacritic assigned it an average score of 77 out of 100, based on 31 reviews. Gregory Heaney of AllMusic compliments the album, saying "it feels as though Explosions in the Sky have developed an even greater sense of patience, allowing songs to build up more intricately without rushing their way into a huge moment of distortion-filled catharsis." Kevin Liedel of Slant Magazine gave it a 3 out of 5, saying "In the end, the Texas band can't help but eventually indulge their desire to produce epic, guitar-driven film-score material, and after some initial feints into other territory, Take Care is business as usual."

== Track listing ==
No.	Title	Length
1.	"Last Known Surroundings"	8:22
2.	"Human Qualities"	8:10
3.	"Trembling Hands"	3:31
4.	"Be Comfortable, Creature"	8:48
5.	"Postcard from 1952"	7:07
6.	"Let Me Back In"	10:07
Total length:		46:05

== Charts ==
Chart performance for Take Care, Take Care, Take Care
Chart (2011)	Peak position
Australian Hitseekers Albums (ARIA)	7
Belgian Albums (Ultratop Flanders)	64
Belgian Albums (Ultratop Wallonia)	73
Canadian Albums (Nielsen SoundScan)	59
Dutch Alternative Albums (Alternative Top 30)	30
Irish Albums (IRMA)	64
Scottish Albums (Official Charts)	53
UK Albums (Official Charts)	58
UK Independent Albums (Official Charts)	8
US Billboard 200	16
US Independent Albums (Billboard)	3
US Indie Store Album Sales (Billboard)	3
US Top Alternative Albums (Billboard)	3
US Top Rock Albums (Billboard)	4
