= Golden retriever egg challenge =

Internet challenge

The Golden retriever egg challenge is a viral video phenomenon where people put a raw egg in a dog's mouth to see if it can hold it without cracking it.

== History ==
It began after the veterinary technician Carrie DuComb read that golden retrievers had soft mouths and were thus bred to be able to retrieve things killed by hunters. She then decided to see if her dog, Sookie, would hold a raw egg in its mouth. Her 17-year-old niece Haley Bowers posted a video of the dog doing this on Twitter, resulting in millions of views, and more than 200,000 retweets. Since then others have tried this with their dogs with various degrees of success.

== Challenge ==
Whether a dog will do it or not depends on their breed and their temperament.

== Health concerns ==
The president of the Australian Veterinary Association, Dr. Paula Parker, has warned people that putting an egg in a dog's mouth could be a choking hazard and that salmonella and other harmful bacteria could be on the outside of the egg as well as the inside. Other professionals, according to Dogs Naturally, have argued that raw eggs are safe and nutritious for dogs.
