= Friday Night Live =

Friday Night Live may refer to:

- Friday Night Live (Big Brother Australia), a television series aired on Network Ten as a part of Big Brother Australia
- Friday Night Live (UK TV show), successor to Saturday Live
- Friday Live, originally titled Friday Night Live, a news commentary program which aired on Sky News Australia

== See also ==
- Friday Night Games, spin-off series of Big Brother Australia
