= Matt McCormick =

Matt McCormick is a Spokane, Washington based video installation artist and filmmaker. His work extends documentary and experimental filmmaking, focusing on the sublime decay of contemporary culture and the landscape both urban and rural.

McCormick is an artist and filmmaker who works in both the art and independent film worlds. He has had three films screen at the Sundance Film Festival, has had work exhibited at Art Basel, Moscow Biennale, and the Museum of Modern Art, and his film The Subconscious Art of Graffiti Removal was named in ‘Top 10 film lists of 2002’ in both Art Forum Magazine and The Village Voice.

He has also directed music videos for The Shins, Broken Bells, Sleater-Kinney, and Yacht, while also collaborating on projects with artists such as Miranda July, James Mercer, Patton Oswalt, and Calvin Johnson.

== Career ==
McCormick's work spans mediums and defies genre distinctions to fashion witty, abstract observations of contemporary culture and the urban landscape. His project Future So Bright maps and catalogs abandoned spaces in the American West, while American Nutria "examines the plight of an imported species while chastising capitalism’s tendency to create its own disasters." The Subconscious Art of Graffiti Removal makes the observation that the process of destroying one art form unwittingly creates another, while his installation piece Ride a Wave To Tomorrow’s Sunset reflects on society's need for ‘synthetic meditation’.

A collection of McCormick's music and sound recordings titled Very Stereo was released in 2007 by Marriage Records.

McCormick is also the founder of the video distribution label Peripheral Produce and the Portland Documentary and Experimental Film Festival.

In 2008 McCormick began production on his first feature-length project called Some Days Are Better Than Others, starring James Mercer and Carrie Brownstein. The Film premiered at the 2010 South by Southwest film and music festival in Austin, Texas.

McCormick's short film, The Deepest Hole, will screen at Sundance Film Festival in January, 2020.

== Works ==
=== Feature films ===
- Some Days Are Better Than Others (2010)
- The Great Northwest (2012)
- Buzz One Four (2017)

=== Short films ===
- Sincerely, Joe P. Bear (1999)
- The Vyrotonin Decision (1999)
- The Subconscious Art of Graffiti Removal (2001)
- American Nutria (2003)
- Towlines (2004)
- The Problem with Machines that Communicate (2007)
- Light Tiger Eye (2008)
- Future So Bright (2009)
- The Deepest Hole (2019)

=== Installation ===
- Future So Bright (2007)
- Satellites (2008)

=== Music videos ===
- The Shins / "The Past and Pending" (Sub Pop Records, 2002)
- Sleater-Kinney / "Jumpers" (Sub Pop Records, 2005)
- Yacht / "See a Penny" (Marriage Records, 2007)
- Arthur and Yu / "Afterglow" (Hardly Art, 2007)
- The Shins / "Australia" (Sub Pop Records, 2007)
- Eluvium / "The Motion Makes Me Last" (Temporary Residence, 2010)

== Screenings and exhibitions ==
Besides numerous film festivals like Sundance and the New York Underground Film Festival McCormick has shown in international art venues like The 2007 Moscow Biennale, The Oslo Museum of Modern Art, The Serpentine Gallery, Uncertain States Of America, Baja to Vancouver and Art Basel Miami Beach (2007).
