= Some Days Are Better Than Others (film) =

Some Days Are Better Than Others is a 2009 film by Portland-based filmmaker Matt McCormick. It explores "isolation and the deadening effects of consumerist-conformist culture." It stars James Mercer and Carrie Brownstein.

The film premiered at the 2010 South by Southwest Film and Music Festival in Austin, Texas.

The original soundtrack was composed and performed by Portland-based ambient musician Matthew Robert Cooper.
