= Lunopolis =

2010 film

- Film poster
- Directed by: Matthew Avant
- Written by: Matthew Avant
- Produced by: Matthew Avant; Hal Maynor IV
- Starring: Matthew Avant; Hal Maynor IV; Dave Potter
- Edited by: Matthew Avant; Hal Maynor
- Production company: Media Savant
- Release date: February 12, 2010
- Running time: 97 minutes
- Country: United States
- Language: English

Lunopolis is a 2010 American Direct-to-video science fiction film directed by Matthew Avant. The film is presented in found footage style and takes place in the weeks preceding the rumored events of the 2012 prophecies. Two documentary filmmakers discover a mysterious device and begin to unravel a conspiracy involving the Moon, time travel, and a very powerful organization who will stop at nothing to protect their secret.

== Plot ==
Footage on the news shows what seems like proof of a paranormal event. Twelve days earlier, on December 9, 2012, a conspiracy-themed radio show takes a call from a man who claims to work at Area 51. After the caller describes a secret civilization on the Moon, he is cut off. George Larson, the host, dismisses it as a hoax until he receives a photo album that contains enough evidence that he hires a documentary crew headed by Matt and Sonny to investigate the claims. Matt and Sonny realize a decades-old Polaroid photograph depicts a man in modern clothing; on the back, it has a series of numbers written on it. They decode these as GPS coordinates that are less than an hour away from where they live in Louisiana.

There, they find a hatch that leads to an underground warehouse. After searching the mostly empty structure, they find a mysterious device none of them can identify. Intrigued, they grab it and flee what they believe are approaching people. Documentation provides little explanation of the device but identifies it as a harness and allows them to turn it on; this turns out to be disastrous. Sonny, who is wearing the harness, disappears for a second and suffers injuries that require a brief hospitalization. Worried that they are over their heads, they take the harness to Dr. Orin Raymond, a local professor. While examining it, Dr. Raymond finds a glowing, green crystal he identifies as found only on the moon. As they leave, a member of the Church of Lunology harasses them and hands them a flyer.

Interviewees describe the Church of Lunology, which claims to be the fastest growing religion. Members believe that a civilization lives on the Moon, and the US government has been covering it up. While Matt and Sonny investigate a Church of Lunology building, one of their camera operators, Nate, takes exterior shots. Separately, both groups are confronted by Church of Lunology members, who demand the return of their time machine. The filmmakers regroup and flee, chased by the Lunology members. Unable to outrun the Lunology members, the filmmakers stop their car and demand an explanation. Instead, the Lunology members' car takes off into the sky. Stunned and unsure of what happened, the filmmakers debate what to do next.

A note leads them to David James, a former member of the lunar colony who explains its history. The lunar colony and Church of Lunology are separate; the colonists are from the future, and Lunology cultists are normal people. Using the lunar rock, J. Ari Hilliard invents immortality and time travel, and, on December 21, 2012, he sends the first mission back to 350 BC, where they begin changing the timeline. This created unintended changes, resulting in a desire to repeatedly tinker with the timeline. Dissidents opposed this, fearing it could result in more unintended changes and weakened dimensional barriers between the changed timelines. The scientists' rationalizations became Lunology.

Hilliard, himself disillusioned, left the lunar colony and tried to reveal the truth, to no avail. Convinced that immortality was too great a power for any one person, he tried to murder himself before he could become immortal. The lunar colony, wise to his plans, prevented his first attempt in 1947, when he was born. His next attempt resulted in the Roswell UFO incident, as he fled the lunar colony back to Earth with the crystal. The crystal exists only in one place across all timelines, so the lunar colony must recover it before they can time travel any further. When Lunologists track down James, the filmmakers flee. Dr. Raymond and Larson both disappear. When the filmmakers return to the spot where they found the harness, it seems to have changed.

James recommends they give the crystal to Hilliard himself. The CEO of Lunology plays stupid, but they set up a meeting with Hilliard. At the meeting, James reveals himself as the immortal, future version of Hilliard. Hilliard says the crystal was a test; James comes to the realization that they failed the test and kills Hilliard, his alternative self, to prevent further time travel. In a possible alternate timeline, people discover the documentary footage. Meanwhile, the anachronistic man from the Polaroid walks into the meeting room, with both timelines intertwining behind him, and picks up the crystal. He also picks up the camera and stares into it, with his eyes glowing green momentarily behind his sunglasses.

== Cast ==
- Matthew Avant as Matt, researcher and filmmaker
- Hal Maynor IV as Sonny, researcher and filmmaker
- Nathan Avant as Nate, camera operator
- Sarah Avant as Sarah, camera operator
- Arte Richard as Arte, owner of a boatyard
- Dave Potter as David James and J. Ari Hilliard
- Jed Himel as the Director
- Ray Blum as Dr. Orin Raymond
- Rob Rue as George Larson, host of the radio call-in show

== Production ==
Shooting took place in Lafayette, Louisiana.

== Release ==
Lunopolis premiered at the Boston Science Fiction Film Festival on February 12, 2010. It was released on DVD in October 2011.

== Reception ==
The film received a rating of 4.5/5 from SBS One film critic Simon Foster who said of the film "The finale... is both 'sci-fi cool' and emotionally impactful." Harry H. Long of the Lebanon Daily News wrote, "Even if it gets a mite tangled up in its own mythmaking, Lunopolis is a lot of fun. Just go along for the ride and don't worry if you fully understand all that's going on." Paul Pritchard of DVD Verdict called it "a fine example of ambitious low-budget filmmaking" and said the found footage gimmick "works better than most films of its ilk". Tyler Foster of DVD Talk rated it 4.5/5 stars and wrote, "Lunopolis [is] an effective, electrifying little movie that's refreshingly interested in engaging the imagination rather than just the eyes and ears."

Avant won Best Director at Sydney's Fantastic Planet Film Festival.
