= How Strange, Innocence =

2000 album by Explosions in the Sky

Studio album by Explosions in the Sky
- Released: January 17, 2000
- Genre: Post-rock; indie rock
- Length: 48:50
- Label: Sad Loud America

Explosions in the Sky chronology
How Strange, Innocence (2000)	Those Who Tell the Truth Shall Die, Those Who Tell the Truth Shall Live Forever (2001)

Professional ratings
Review scores
Source	Rating
AllMusic	3/5 stars
Lost at Sea	7/10
Pitchfork	7.9/10
Rolling Stone	(favorable)
Stylus Magazine	B−
Tiny Mix Tapes	3.5/5 stars

How Strange, Innocence is the debut studio album by American post-rock band Explosions in the Sky, released on January 17, 2000 through Sad Loud America (the groups' only release with the label). Initially, only 300 copies were issued in the form of CD-Rs. Due to demand from fans, the album was remastered from the original tapes, given new artwork, and reissued on CD by Temporary Residence Limited on October 11, 2005.

The album was also released in a limited edition, 300 copy, double LP 180 gram vinyl on Ruined Potential records. The record was released in 5 different colors (black, blue, red, gray and white). The black, blue, and gray versions came with a special insert. The band sold the vinyl version exclusively on their 2004 tour. On July 4, 2019, a vinyl re-issue and streaming platform release (along with 2005's The Rescue) was announced for August 16.

== Track listing ==
No.	Title	Length
1.	"A Song for Our Fathers"	5:43
2.	"Snow and Lights"	8:17
3.	"Magic Hours"	8:29
4.	"Look into the Air"	5:30
5.	"Glittering Blackness"	5:30
6.	"Time Stops"	9:55
7.	"Remember Me as a Time of Day"	5:27
Total length:		48:50
