= Pat Perry (artist) =

American painter and street artist

- Born: 1991 (age 34–35); Pontiac, Michigan
- Education: Kendall College of Art and Design
- Known for: mural painting
- Notable work: National Lilypond Songs, Song and Dance, Which World
- Style: American vernacular landscape painting
- Website: www.patperry.net

Pat Perry (born 1991) is an American painter and street artist based in Detroit, Michigan. He is best known for a series of sketchbooks and 35mm photographs documenting years of itinerant traveling around the United States and painting realistic depictions of 21st century America. His practice also includes mural painting, photography, illustration, storytelling, and freight train tagging.

== Early life ==
Perry was born in Pontiac, Michigan, and grew up in Comstock Park. His father was a copywriter, and his mother was a remedial teacher. From 2009 to 2012, Pat attended Kendall College of Art and Design, but did not graduate.

== Career ==
During the early 2010s, Perry gained recognition for his series of sketchbooks and photographs collected while traveling around the United States by hitchhiking and riding freight trains. His large-scale works and posters have called attention to various social causes through collaborations with groups such as AptArts, No More Deaths, and the UN High Commissioner For Refugees. He collaborated with the Beehive Design Collective on their years-long poster project, MesoAmerica Resiste.

From 2015 to the present, Perry created for his large-scale murals on buildings in Belgium, Mozambique, Australia, Sweden, Finland, Kosovo, New Zealand, and Iraqi Kurdistan, as well as several murals in Detroit. His murals depict diverse cultures and landscapes of different parts of the world, often involving humanistic, socially-conscious themes. In addition to murals on buildings, Perry has worked on murals on the exterior of a plane, automotive vehicles as well as a skateboard park.

In 2018, Perry had his first museum exhibition, titled National Lilypond Songs, at the Urban Institute for Contemporary Art in Grand Rapids, Michigan. The show featured depictions of the American landscape, and was considered as a major shift for Perry. The style of painting was compared to the artworks of Andrew Wyeth and Grant Wood.

In 2020, Perry had his second solo exhibition, Song and Dance, at Takashi Murakami’s Hidari Zingaro gallery in Tokyo, Japan. In 2021, Perry debuted Sensemaking, which depicted quiet scenes framed through roadside vantage points and performances of costumed figures and contemporary symbols. The works centered around a broad theme of flawed logic while continuing his social commentary.

In 2023, Perry presented a solo exhibition, Which World, at Hashimoto Contemporary in Los Angeles. The artwork utilized images from crowd-sourced, public-facing archives like Craigslist or YouTube. Everyday objects were used to represent the effects of the digital age on day-to-day life in Perry's Craigslist series.

In 2025, Perry completed 27 Schoolteachers and a Volcano, a mural in Princeton, Wisconsin, commissioned by the Princeton Art Collective. The work depicts a volcanic landscape bordered by portraits of local schoolteachers who participated in the project. The mural examines how individuals sustain a sense of purpose through everyday acts of service while existing amid broader, uncontrollable global forces.

In 2025, Perry created a flyer titled Mentor Wanted, a public call centered on the ambiguities of adult life. The project was described as a response to prevailing certainty in online discourse. The flyer was posted in cities across the United States and internationally, and was also made available as a free download.

== Work ==
=== Selected exhibitions ===
==== Solo ====
- 2024: Especially Terrific, Fort Wayne Museum Of Art, IN
- 2023: Which World, Hashimoto Contemporary, Los Angeles, CA
- 2021: Sensemaking, Hashimoto Contemporary, NYC
- 2020: Song and Dance, Hidari Zingaro Gallery, Tokyo, JP
- 2018: National Lilypond Songs, Michigan Institute for Contemporary Art, Grand Rapids, MI
- 2016: The House You Came From, Dorothy Circus Gallery, Rome, IT

==== Group ====
- 2025: Hi-Vis, Buffalo AKG Art Museum, Buffalo, NY
- 2025: Elements of the Anthropocene, Dorothy Circus Gallery, London, UK
- 2024: 10 Year Anniversary, Hashimoto Contemporary, San Francisco, CA
- 2022: Printmaking in the Twenty-First Century, Detroit Institute of Arts, Detroit, MI
- 2021: Polemic, ABC No Rio, NYC
- 2016: The Detroiter, Heron Arts, San Francisco, CA
- 2014: Miscellanea, Martha Otero Gallery, Los Angeles, CA

=== Selected commissions ===
- 2025: 27 Schoolteachers and a Volcano, Princeton Art Collective, Princeton, WI
- 2024: Erie County Witness Tree Map, Buffalo AKG Art Museum, Buffalo, NY
- 2024: Detroit Institute of Arts (PIPA Murals), Detroit, MI
