= Golden Retriever (band) =

American musical duo

- Origin: Portland, Oregon, U.S.
- Genres: Classical; ambient; electronic
- Years active: 2008–present
- Label: Thrill Jockey
- Members: Jonathan Sielaff; Matt Carlson

Golden Retriever is an American musical duo from Portland, Oregon.

Jonathan Sielaff (formerly of Au) and Matt Carlson both played in the experimental music community in the Pacific Northwest in the mid-2000s. Sielaff played with Carlson's band Parenthetical Girls. They founded Golden Retriever in 2008 and began releasing albums on cassette and CD-R. In 2012, the group signed with Thrill Jockey and released Occupied with the Unspoken; Seer followed in 2014.

== Members ==
- Jonathan Sielaff - bass clarinet
- Matt Carlson - analog synthesizer

== Discography ==
- Golden Retriever (Root Strata, 2010)
- Static Rain (Gift Tapes, 2010)
- Golden Retriever 2 (Bucket Factory, 2010)
- Arda Viraf (Agents of Chaos, 2011)
- Emergent Layer (NNA Tapes, 2011)
- Light Cones (Root Strata, 2012)
- Occupied with the Unspoken (Thrill Jockey, 2012)
- Seer (Thrill Jockey, 2014)
- Rotations (Thrill Jockey, 2017)
- Rain Shadow with Chuck Johnson (Thrill Jockey, 2020)
