= Nightmare Ending =

Studio album by Eluvium
- Released: May 14, 2013
- Genre: Ambient
- Length: 83:47
- Label: Temporary Residence Limited

Eluvium chronology
The Motion Makes Me Last (2010)	Nightmare Ending (2013)	Curious Things (2016)

Professional ratings
Review scores
Source	Rating
AllMusic	4/5 stars
Consequence of Sound	3.5/5 stars
Sputnikmusic	3.9/5

Nightmare Ending is the seventh studio album from Portland, Oregon ambient musician Matthew Robert Cooper, under the name Eluvium. It is a double-album and was released on May 14, 2013. The album’s final track, “Happiness”, features vocals by Ira Kaplan of the band Yo La Tengo. A special digital edition, featuring a print by artist Jeannie Paske, was released on May 1, 2013, limited to 300 copies.

== Track listing ==
Disc 1

1. "Don't Get Any Closer" – 9:06
2. "Warm" – 7:10
3. "By the Rails" – 2:15
4. "Unknown Variation" – 8:42
5. "Caroling" – 3:54
6. "Sleeper" – 6:17
7. "Envenom Mettle" – 5:23

Disc 2

1. "Chime" – 3:26
2. "Rain Gently" – 8:49
3. "Impromptu (For the Procession)" – 4:01
4. "Covered in Writing" – 9:18
5. "Entendre" – 4:20
6. "Strange Arrivals" – 2:50
7. "Happiness" (ft. Ira Kaplan) – 8:16
