= Friday Night Lights (film soundtrack) =

Soundtrack album by Explosions in the Sky
- Released: October 12, 2004
- Recorded: Burbank, California
- Genres: Instrumental rock, post-rock
- Length: 52:52
- Label: Hip-O Select
- Producers: Brian Reitzell; Justin Stanley; Richard Jory

Explosions in the Sky chronology
The Earth Is Not a Cold Dead Place (2003)	Friday Night Lights (2004)	The Rescue (2005)

Alternative Cover
- Vinyl Edition Cover

Professional ratings
Review scores
Source	Rating
AllMusic	3.5/5 stars
Pitchfork Media	5.5/10

Friday Night Lights is the soundtrack for the 2004 film Friday Night Lights, largely composed by American post-rock band Explosions in the Sky during June and August 2004. Additionally, the album features music by Daniel Lanois, Bad Company, and David Torn.

Explosions in the Sky became involved with the project after receiving an email from producer Brian Reitzell that said "he was working on a new movie and he was wondering if [the band] would be interested in doing music for it." The members were familiar with the book on which the film was based, and were raised in its setting of West Texas. Despite having access to "all sorts of rare equipment", the band did not deviate from its usual songwriting style. The prominent track "Your Hand in Mine" was adapted from the 2003 album The Earth Is Not a Cold Dead Place.

Some songs from the film, including "Your Hand In Mine," "Inside It All Feels the Same," "The Sky Above, the Field Below," "To West Texas," "A Slow Dance," "From West Texas," "An Ugly Fact of Life," and "Home" have been featured on the subsequent television show.

A double vinyl version of the album was released exclusively through Hip-O Select records and was limited to only 2500 copies.

== Track listing ==
1. "From West Texas" - 2:41
2. "Your Hand in Mine (w/Strings)" - 4:08
3. "Our Last Days as Children" - 2:41
4. "An Ugly Fact of Life" - 2:55
5. "Home" - 2:38
6. "Sonho Dourado" (Daniel Lanois) - 3:26
7. "To West Texas" - 4:06
8. "Your Hand in Mine (Goodbye)" - 2:05
9. "Inside It All Feels the Same" - 4:23
10. "Do You Ever Feel Cursed" (David Torn) - 3:23
11. "Lonely Train" - 6:51
12. "Seagull" (Bad Company) - 4:03
13. "The Sky Above, the Field Below" - 5:40
14. "A Slow Dance" - 3:53
