= The Earth Is Not a Cold Dead Place =

Studio album by Explosions in the Sky
- Released: November 4, 2003
- Genre: Post-rock
- Length: 45:37
- Label: Temporary Residence TRR61
- Producer: John Congleton

Explosions in the Sky chronology
Those Who Tell the Truth Shall Die, Those Who Tell the Truth Shall Live Forever (2001)	The Earth Is Not a Cold Dead Place (2003)	Friday Night Lights (2004)

The Earth Is Not a Cold Dead Place is the third studio album by American post-rock band Explosions in the Sky, released on November 4, 2003, through Temporary Residence Limited. Explosions in the Sky is composed of Mark Smith and Munaf Rayani on guitars, Michael James on bass, and Christopher Hrasky on drums, with the album being produced by John Congleton. The album consists of five tracks that span a total runtime of 45 minutes.

Having formed in Austin, Texas in 1999, the band recorded two studio albums before releasing The Earth Is Not a Cold Dead Place. The album is often considered to be released within the context of the post-September 11 attacks world, despite the attacks not being taken into consideration by the band during recording. The music of the album is without lyrics, and includes tracks that are considered to be inspired by reactions to crises, including the Kursk submarine disaster. The album generally garnered critical acclaim.

== Background ==
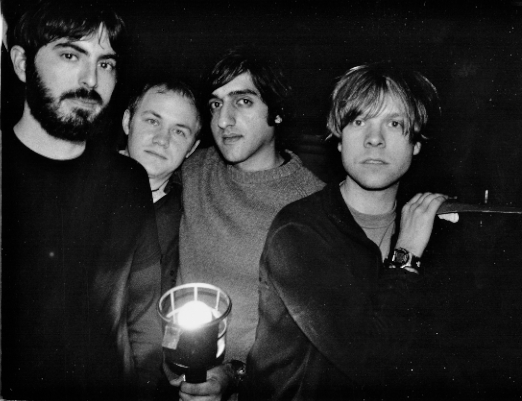
A group picture of the members of Explosions in the Sky. From left to right: Mark Smith, Michael James, Munaf Rayani, and Chris Hrasky

Originally known as Breaker Morant, Explosions in the Sky was formed in 1999 in Austin, Texas by Mark Smith and Munaf Rayani (guitars), Michael James (bass), and Christopher Hrasky (drums). They released their first album, How Strange, Innocence with Temporary Residence Limited in 2000. In 2001, the band released their second album Those Who Tell the Truth Shall Die, Those Who Tell the Truth Shall Live Forever, which was widely distributed and led to a critical breakthrough for the band. As the band's money and concentration began to decrease, they returned to Midland, Texas, where The Earth Is Not a Cold Dead Place was recorded. The band worked day jobs to play in an office building basement.

Between Those Who Tell the Truth Shall Die, Those Who Tell the Truth Shall Live Forever and The Earth Is Not a Cold Dead Place, the September 11 attacks occurred. It was within the context of the post-September 11 world that The Earth Is Not a Cold Dead Place was released. Although the band did not have the September 11 attacks in mind while recording the album, band member Christopher Hrasky commented that "if people look at it as though 'this song is about 9/11,' then that connection exists for them." The album was, according to producer John Congleton, recorded and mixed in three days.

== Music ==
None of the tracks on The Earth Is Not a Cold Dead Place have lyrics. "Six Days at the Bottom of the Ocean" was inspired by the Kursk submarine disaster in 2000 – the band sees the track as "the album's darkest moment". Songs like "First Breath After Coma", "Memorial" and "Your Hand in Mine" suggest "personal or collective reactions to crises", according to scholars of September 11-related music Joseph Fisher and Brian Flota. Hartley Goldstein of Pitchfork compared the album to their previous one, saying that it was much warmer and "laced with an intense yearning for optimism in the face of horrific circumstance."

The album opens with "First Breath After Coma", starting with a sound that "captures a moment of awakening" with a guitar that mimics "the incessant nerve-wracking electrical beeps of a hospital heart monitor". Guitars "dance and gleam" through "The Only Moment We Were Alone". The closing guitar freak-out of "The Only Moment We Were Alone" transitions into "Six Days at the Bottom of the Ocean", which relies heavily on it.

Johnny Loftus of AllMusic referred to "Memorial" as the "meditative heart" of the album, saying that "it begins so quietly, reduced to brittle landscapes of tone. Lightly chiming guitars drift in, like the echoes of church bells off in narrow city streets. Then, like each of the album's movements, it surges forward in a rush, like the overtures of Sonic Youth separated, dried, and ultimately lengthened in the blistering Texas sun."

"Your Hand in Mine" is the most popular of the album's tracks. Loftus describes it as including a "pair of determined guitars picking out a melody that's both pretty and pretty damn heartbreaking."

== Title and packaging ==
The title of The Earth Is Not a Cold Dead Place originated, according to Hrasky, "from this idea of life being very confusing. It was a dark time, and the record is sort of about trying to hang on to the beauty in the world."

The cover, designed by Esteban Rey, depicts the album's name in black written repeatedly across a white background. Hrasky explains that "that way we could kind of imagine that it was written by someone who sees all the horror and terror of the world, but who is also trying to look at all the wonderful and beautiful things." The inside sleeve of the album depicts "a sketch of lifeless autumnal leaf wistfully tumbling in the air, only to transform into the body of a fluttering dove."

== Critical reception ==
Professional ratings
Aggregate scores
Source	Rating
Metacritic	86/100
Review scores
Source	Rating
AllMusic	4.5/5 stars
Alternative Press	4/5
Drowned in Sound	9/10
Entertainment Weekly	A−
The Guardian	4/5 stars
Mojo	4/5 stars
Pitchfork	7.7/10
Q	3/5 stars
Tiny Mix Tapes	4.5/5 stars
Uncut	4/5 stars

The album was received well, with a rating of 86 out of 100 on Metacritic, based on reviews from 17 critics, indicating "universal acclaim". Stylus called the album "essential", with the reviewer remarking that "I may never need another instrumental album like this again". Guitar.com argues that it is the "ultimate post-rock album". The Guardian praised the album, calling the tracks "tunes that twinkle and thunder like exploding stars, and show that there are still infinite possibilities in two guitars, bass and drums." Entertainment Weekly commented on the "gargantuan beauty" of the album. Pitchfork pinpointed the most impressive part of the album as the fact that it is constantly in flux, and called it "a sweetly melodic, inspirationally hopeful album for a genre whose trademark is tragedy." Blender, however, gave a mixed review of the album, saying that it was "executing almost exactly the same formula [as the first track] four more times ... and the dramatic shock wears off quickly."

The album is featured on a list of 30 best post-rock albums as compiled by Fact, at the 20th spot. Fact praises the simplicity of the album, but also calls its simplicity the reason for its downfall, as "their blueprint was easy to replicate, creating a sea of diluted copyists. But there's no taking away the sparkle of the album that inspired them all". Kerrang! put the album on its list of the 16 greatest post-rock albums, saying that there was "something wonderfully, moreishly melodramatic about this set, possessing an unspoken narrative that post-rock rarely conjured". Paste put the album at the 24th spot on its list of the 50 best post-rock albums, describing the album as having "dramatic compositions that swell and recede like a deep meditative breath before bursting forth with fist-pumping crescendos".

== In other media ==
On the Versus TV network, "First Breath After Coma" was used to introduce feature presentations. "The Only Moment We Were Alone" is featured on the film Capitalism: A Love Story (2009). According to guitarist Munaf Rayani, "it's exciting to see visual images accompany our music."

The Ted Cruz 2016 presidential campaign used "Your Hand in Mine" in a campaign video, which was taken down following comments against the use by the band.

== Track listing ==
The Earth Is Not a Cold Dead Place track listing
No.	Title	Length
1.	"First Breath After Coma"	9:33
2.	"The Only Moment We Were Alone"	10:14
3.	"Six Days at the Bottom of the Ocean"	8:43
4.	"Memorial"	8:50
5.	"Your Hand in Mine"	8:16
Total length:		45:37

== Credits ==
- Munaf Rayani (guitars)
- Michael James (guitars/bass)
- Mark T Smith (guitars)
- Christopher Hrasky (drums)
- Recorded and engineered by John Congleton
