= Cokemachineglow =

Canadian music webzine

Cokemachineglow was a Canadian webzine dedicated mainly to music criticism, though it also featured articles about local music scenes. It was founded in 2002 and closed down permanently at the end of 2015. In 2006, it was described as one of "the most influential music blogs" by the Washington City Paper.

Writers included Archway Editions founder Chris Molnar. In 2022, cokemachineglow: Writing Around Music 2005–2015, a compilation of writing from the website, was published by the imprint, distributed by Simon & Schuster.
