= Explosions in the Sky =

American post-rock band

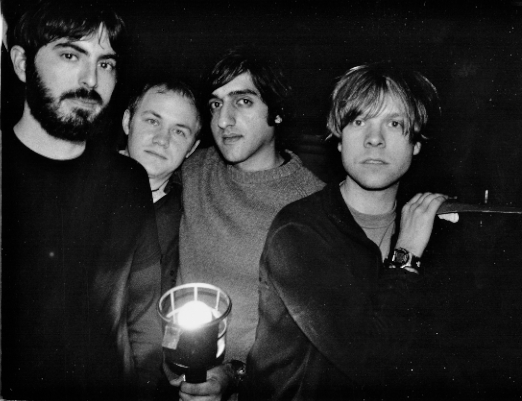
- From left to right: Mark Smith, Michael James, Munaf Rayani, and Chris Hrasky

Background information
- Origin: Austin, Texas, U.S. Midland, Texas, U.S.
- Genres: Post-rock; instrumental rock
- Years active: 1999–present
- Labels: Temporary Residence Limited, Bella Union
- Members: Chris Hrasky; Michael James; Munaf Rayani; Mark Smith
- Website: www.explosionsinthesky.com

Explosions in the Sky is an American post-rock band, formed in Austin, Texas, in 1999. The band is a quartet, composed of drummer Chris Hrasky and guitarists/keyboardists Michael James, Munaf Rayani, and Mark Smith. The band originally played under the name Breaker Morant, then changed to the current name in 1999. They primarily play with three electric guitars and a drum kit, although James will at times exchange his electric guitar for a bass guitar, and all three guitarists also add additional keyboard and synthesizer parts. The band later added a fifth musician to their live performances, largely to accommodate for these bass and keyboard parts. This role was occupied by multi instrumentalist Carlos Torres from 2010 to 2018 and reprised in 2024. The band has released eight studio albums to date; their most recent, End, was released in September 2023.

The band has garnered popularity beyond the post-rock scene for their elaborately developed guitar work, narratively styled instrumentals – which they refer to as "cathartic mini-symphonies" – and their emotional live shows.

== History ==
Originally called Breaker Morant, Explosions in the Sky was formed in Austin, Texas, in 1999. Drummer Chris Hrasky is from Rockford, Illinois, and the rest of the band hails from Midland, Texas. The new name of "Explosions in the Sky" came from a comment Hrasky made in reference to the noise or sight of fireworks when they left KVRX on the night they played their first set and recorded their first track, "Remember Me as a Time of Day", that would be released on a compilation. Their 2000 debut album, How Strange, Innocence, was locally distributed in the form of CD-Rs. Rehearsal footage is featured on the feature film Cicadas, which won an Austin Film Festival award.

Performing at Central Park SummerStage on June 30, 2009

Explosions in the Sky quickly gained a reputation among other established bands such as Lift to Experience. Temporary Residence Limited signed the band on the strength of their demo after only half a listen; the demo was submitted by fellow Austin band The American Analog Set with a brief note saying, "This totally fucking destroys."

They garnered a small amount of media attention with their second album, Those Who Tell the Truth Shall Die, Those Who Tell the Truth Shall Live Forever, due to rumors linking it to the September 11, 2001 attacks. The band denied any connection in interviews. The album art shows an airplane with the caption "This plane will crash tomorrow." There were false reports that the last track was called "This Plane Will Crash Tomorrow" and that the album was released on September 10, 2001; the concept had actually originated in 2000, and the album was officially released on September 4, 2001. Bassist Michael James was detained in an airport as a threat to security and had to explain why his guitar contained the words "this plane will crash tomorrow".

The band also received a considerable amount of attention playing before large audiences as the opening act of Fugazi's spring 2002 US tour in support of The Argument.

The band released The Earth Is Not A Cold Dead Place in 2003 and this is generally considered their most famous album. The album has been described as a concept album and was stated by guitarist Munaf Rayani as the band's attempt at love songs.

After being contacted by Brian Reitzell, Explosions in the Sky wrote the soundtrack for the 2004 film Friday Night Lights. Despite having access to rare equipment in the studio for that project, the band kept to their songwriting style in creating original material.

Their album The Rescue was written and recorded in eight days as part of the TRL Travels in Constants series. As such, the album was originally only available at the band's live shows.

Explosions in the Sky's fifth studio album, All of a Sudden I Miss Everyone, which debuted February 20, 2007, exists as both a one-disc version and a two-disc special edition featuring remixes by multiple artists. The band began touring on February 19 in the U.S. and Canada.

On April 26, 2011, the band released their sixth studio album, Take Care, Take Care, Take Care.

The band served as one of the support acts for Nine Inch Nails on their North American leg of the Twenty Thirteen Tour in late 2013, alternating dates with Godspeed You! Black Emperor. Following a period of seldom live shows across 2014 and 2015, the band returned in 2016 with their seventh studio album, The Wilderness. Two singles were released from the album prior to its April release: "Separation Anxiety" in January, and "Logic of a Dream" in February. The band toured extensively in support of the album throughout 2016 and into 2017, playing over 140 shows worldwide.

In April 2023, the band announced via their website their first North American tour since 2019. The tour was dubbed "The End Tour", leading to speculation that the tour could be their last. On July 17, however, their official Twitter account announced the release of their eighth album, titled End, for September 15. In a press release for the announcement, they explained that the title came from "the concept of an ending—death, or the end of a friendship or relationship", and does not imply that it would be the band's final album.

== Musical style ==
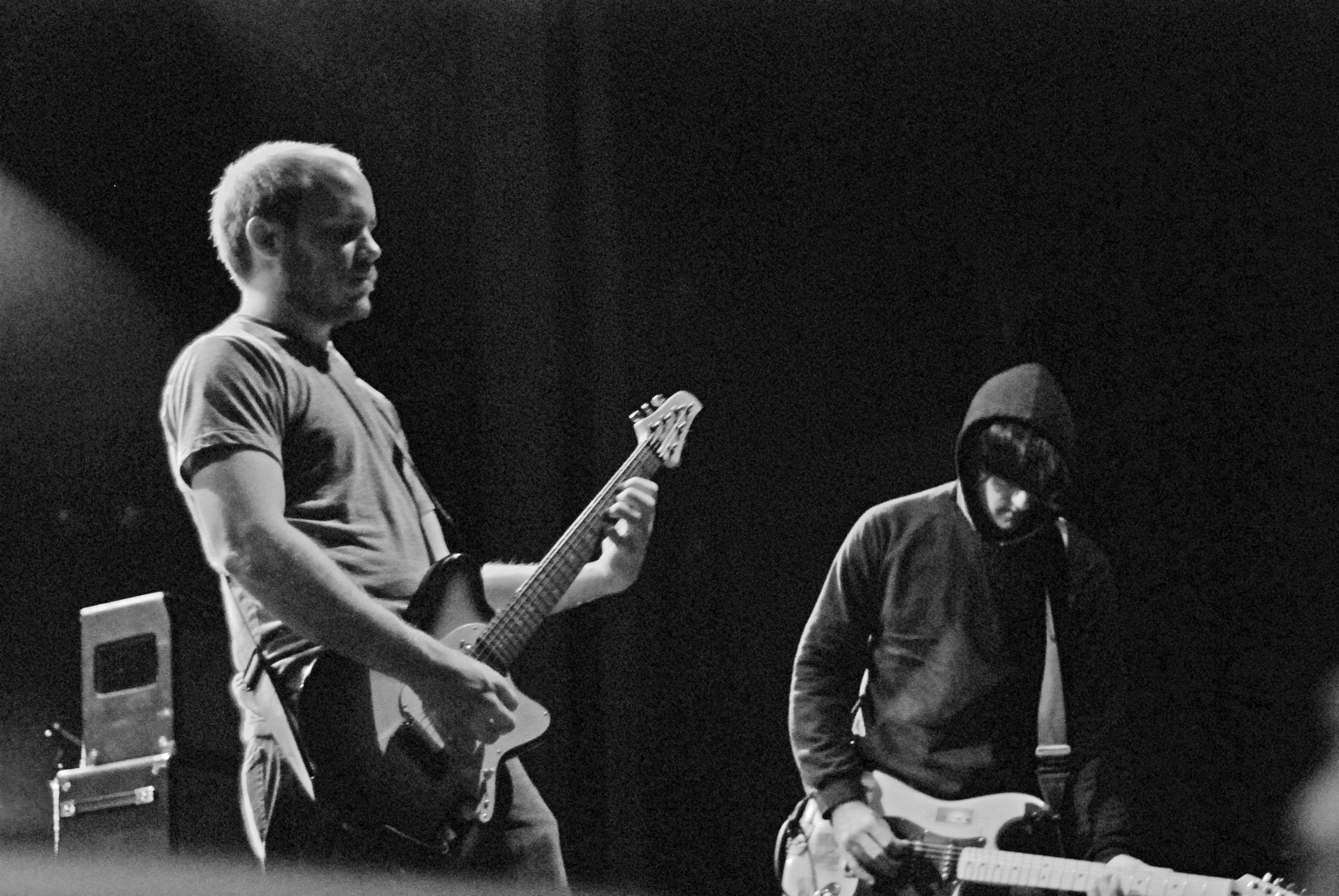
On stage in the Webster Hall, New York City, 2007

Explosions in the Sky is known for their "cathartic, heavily dynamic instrumental rock" sound, described as "moody" and "crescendo-heavy".

Although Explosions in the Sky is known for eschewing the conventions of popular music, Hrasky has compared the band's use of hooks to those of pop music, "like immediately grabbing your attention and getting to your emotions." Although many major publications have classified Explosions in the Sky as a post-rock group, Rayani has stated that the band members prefer to simply be called a "rock band".

In a post-show interview clip on Austin City Limits, guitarist Munaf Rayani said about their status as instrumentalists, "I mean, I think we discussed singing for half a second, and then it just kinda, we just dropped it. We just didn't go back to it because we were comfortable enough." Drummer Chris Hrasky added, "I think we just liked the idea of a band that there was not a leader or main songwriter, everyone sort of collaborating and has their own say. I don't think any of us want the sort of 'leader role', so a leaderless band is kind of the best option for us."

== In popular culture ==
In addition to the band writing original music for film and television scores, many existing songs by Explosions in the Sky have been used to soundtrack visual media. The success of the Friday Night Lights movie brought "a whole new world of listeners to the band", according to guitarist Munaf Rayani, while the subsequent television show "amplified" this effect. The band turned down the chance to record a theme song for the series, which was instead a piece composed by W. G. Snuffy Walden that "recreate[d] our sound".

"First Breath After Coma", which featured prominently in Friday Night Lights, was also used to introduce feature presentations on the television network Versus, the trailer for the Steve Hwang documentary Focus, an Adidas commercial featuring Chicago Bulls player Derrick Rose, the end of the television series Doctors, the 2005 Israeli film Close to Home and in the first episode of John Bishop's Australia. It was also used in the 2010 film Kalamity along with "Six Days at the Bottom of the Ocean" from the same album. The latter song also featured in the film Lunopolis.

Other music by Explosions in the Sky used in several popular culture includes:

- "The Birth and Death of the Day" was used in the BBC documentary Lost Land of the Jaguar, All the Real Girls, Shopgirl, One Tree Hill, Love the Beast and The Diving Bell and the Butterfly, at the end of the 2015 mountaineering documentary Meru, as well as various songs for the PBS documentary The Street Stops Here. A number of One Tree Hill episodes are named after the band's songs.
- The song "It's Natural To Be Afraid" is featured in the narrative sports documentary series 24/7, "Mayweather vs. De La Hoya", and was also used in the season 8 finale of CSI: Crime Scene Investigation, "For Gedda (Part 1)".
- The song "Catastrophe and the Cure" is used during the intro to Get Collins, an Irish documentary on Michael Collins and the film Kaboom by director Gregg Araki in which the male lead is also given a signed copy of All of a Sudden I Miss Everyone as a birthday gift.
- The song "The Only Moment We Were Alone" is shortly featured in Michael Moore's documentary Capitalism: A Love Story. It was also featured in the 2008 film Sleepwalking and in the teaser reveal of Street Fighter V.
- The song "Your Hand in Mine" is featured in the films Friday Night Lights, The Big Empty, Love Happens, The King of Staten Island, the TV series Prisoners' Wives, the documentary Gideon's Army and the Cerveza Pacifico TV commercial "Anchors Up".
- The song "A Poor Man's Memory" is featured in the TV show Blue Mountain State.
- The song "Glittering Blackness" is featured in the film Ghosts of Girlfriends Past.
- The song "So Long, Lonesome" is featured in the 2010 film Last Night.
- The song "An Ugly Fact of Life" was featured in the film adaptation of The Kite Runner.
- The song "Human Qualities" is featured in the 2012 film This Means War.
- The song "Trembling Hands" is featured on the 2012 video game Major League Baseball 2K12.
- The song "The Birth and Death of the Day" is used in the final scene of the mountain biking documentary Life Cycles
- The song "Waking Up" was featured in the film Lone Survivor.
- The song "Postcard From 1952" was used in the episode "Chicago" of Foo Fighters: Sonic Highways, and a snippet of the song is used in the Welcome to Night Vale episode "The September Monologues".
- Along with David Wingo, Explosions in the Sky wrote the entire soundtrack to the 2013 comedy-drama film Prince Avalanche, starring Paul Rudd and Emile Hirsch. The idea itself came when the band proposed working on a film with director David Gordon Green.
- The band is filmed performing "Last Known Surroundings" for Terrance Malick's 2015 film Knight of Cups.
- The song "Remember Me as a Time of Day" was used in the 2015 film Me and Earl and the Dying Girl.
- Their song "Logic of a Dream" was used in the trailer of the 2016 film Deepwater Horizon.
- Their song "The Ecstatics" was used in the 2017 film Power Rangers.
- Austin-based movie theater chain Alamo Drafthouse Cinema uses "Wilderness" in their Feature Presentation bumper.

== Band members ==
- Chris Hrasky – drums
- Michael James – guitar, bass, keyboards
- Munaf Rayani – guitar, keyboards, percussion
- Mark Smith – guitar, keyboards

Current touring musicians

- Carlos Torres – bass, guitar, keyboards, percussion (2010–2018, 2024–present)

Former touring musicians

- David Wingo – guitar, keyboards (2013)
- Jay Demko – bass guitar, guitar, keyboards, percussion (2019–2024)

== Discography ==
=== Studio albums ===
- How Strange, Innocence (2000)
- Those Who Tell the Truth Shall Die, Those Who Tell the Truth Shall Live Forever (2001)
- The Earth Is Not a Cold Dead Place (2003)
- The Rescue (2005)
- All of a Sudden I Miss Everyone (2007)
- Take Care, Take Care, Take Care (2011)
- The Wilderness (2016)
- End (2023)

=== Soundtracks ===
- Friday Night Lights (2004)
- Prince Avalanche (2013)
- Lone Survivor (2013)
- Manglehorn (2014)
- Big Bend (2021)
- American Primeval (2025)
- The Mosquito Bowl (2026)

=== Compilations ===
- "Remember Me as a Time of Day" on Refurbished Robots (1999)
- "The Long Spring" on Thank You (TRR50) (2004), Temporary Residence Limited
- "Welcome Ghosts" sampler on Destroy Independent Music! (2007), Temporary Residence Limited
- "First Breath After Coma" on Friday Night Lights (television soundtrack) (2007), Adrenaline Records
- "Your Hand in Mine" on The Steel People (2009)
- "Your Hand in Mine" on the Love Happens soundtrack (2009)
- "You Knew Joe?" on the Joe soundtrack (2013)
- "Remember Me as a Time of Day" on the Me and Earl and the Dying Girl soundtrack (2015)

=== Singles ===
- "A Song for Our Fathers" (2000)
- "Last Known Surroundings" (2011)
- "Be Comfortable, Creature" (2011)
- "Postcard from 1952" (2011)
- "The Ecstatics" (2017)

== See also ==
- List of post-rock bands
