= Body Void =

American metal band formed in 2014

- Also known as: Devoid (2014–2016)
- Origin: San Francisco, California; Winooski, Vermont
- Genres: Doom metal; sludge metal; drone metal; noise; industrial
- Years active: 2014–present
- Label: Prosthetic
- Members: Willow Ryan; Eddie Holgerson; Janys-Iren Faughn
- Past members: Parker Ryan
- Website: bodyvoid.bandcamp.com

Body Void is an American sludge metal/doom metal band, formed in 2014 in San Francisco, California (before relocating to Winooski, Vermont in 2019). Originally known as Devoid, they currently consist of vocalist/guitarist Willow Ryan, drummer Eddie Holgerson, and soundscapist Janys-Iren Faughn. They have released four studio albums, including the Prosthetic Records releases Bury Me Beneath This Rotting Earth (2021) and Atrocity Machine (2023), the latter of which was critically acclaimed. The band have been noted for their exceptionally heavy sound, use of noise and industrial elements, and prominent queer and political themes.

== History ==
=== Origins, I and II, and Ruins (2014–2018) ===
Body Void formed in 2014 in San Francisco under the name Devoid, with an original lineup of Willow Ryan (vocals, guitar), their (Note: Willow Ryan uses they/them pronouns.) brother Parker Ryan (bass), and Eddie Holgerson (drums). Prior to forming the band, the three had not played music regularly in several years.

In their first two years, the band released a single, "Patriarch Scum", and a pair of demos, which they then compiled as the 2015 EP I & II, issued by Transylanian Tapes. This garnered the attention of CVLT Nation, who included them in a list of "doom bands you should hear today" and praised the compilation as "completely untampered" and "an album to be revered".

Ahead of their debut album Ruins, recorded and mixed by Brainoil's Greg Wilkinson and released June 16, 2016 via Transylvanian Tapes, the group rebranded to Body Void, after a song on their second demo, to have a more unique name. Ruins was included on CVLT Nation's top-ten list of the year's best sludge releases, while Kim Kelly, writing for Vice, praised the album as "perfectly horrible music, with an emphasis on 'perfectly.'" The following March, they appeared on CVLT Nation's Doom Nation Vol. VII compilation album, alongside Monarch!, Graves at Sea, and Electric Wizard. In December, KQED's The Bay Bridged included their song "Swans" on a mixtape of emerging Bay Area metal bands.

=== I Live Inside a Burning House and You Will Know The Fear You Forced Upon Us EP (2018–2019) ===
In March 2018, Body Void premiered via CVLT Nation the song "Haunted", simultaneously announcing an upcoming second album, I Live Inside a Burning House. Another song from the album, "Given", was streamed via Metal Injection the following month. The band again recorded with Wilkinson, this time adding Brad Boatright as mastering engineer. The album was released on May 11, 2018, via Seeing Red, Crown & Throne, and Dry Cough Records, and given an exclusive stream by the website Echoes and Dust. Kelly, again writing for Vice, listed it among her favorite metal albums of the year.

The following March, they released the two-song EP You Will Know The Fear You Forced Upon Us, via the same labels. The EP again made CVLT Nation's list of the year's top sludge releases. The Quietus also mentioned the EP in their year-end list of metal albums, calling it "excellent" and "a righteous call to arms". Invisible Oranges wrote that the band "demonstrate excellence at this brand of claustrophobic, all-encompassing noise devastation."

=== Move to Vermont, signing to Prosthetic, and Bury Me Beneath This Rotting Earth (2019–2023) ===
In late 2019, the band amicably split with Parker Ryan, who left to pursue other projects. Concurrently, unhappy with the Bay Area metal scene, the remaining duo of Willow Ryan and Eddie Holgerson relocated to the New England region, settling in Winooski, Vermont.

The band recorded a split album with the band Keeper, released on January 15, 2020 via Roman Nvmeral and Tridroid Records and given an exclusive stream via Invisible Oranges. On February 5, they performed with Bismuth and Vile Creature's KW Campol at The Black Heart in Camden Town, London.

In the summer of 2020, amid the COVID-19 pandemic and the George Floyd protests, the group began writing and recording a third album. The album was produced by Eric Sauter, with Wilkinson moving to mixing and mastering, longtime collaborator Ibay Arifin Suradi handling the artwork, and Janys-Iren Faughn, then the band's touring bassist and a solo artist under the name Entresol, providing noise and electronics.

In February 2021, the band announced they had signed to Prosthetic Records and released "Wound", the first single from their third album, titled Bury Me Beneath This Rotting Earth. Another single, "Fawn", was premiered the following month via Decibel. In early April, they performed at a virtual edition of Roadburn Festival, alongside Aaron Turner, Nadja, Steve Von Till, Dawn Ray'd, Emma Ruth Rundle, Thou, Sunrot, Inter Arma, Kayo Dot, and Blanck Mass.

Bury Me Beneath This Rotting Earth was released on April 23 via Prosthetic, with a cassette release by Tridroid Records. It was included on Kerrang!'s list of the month's best rock and metal albums, PopMatters's list of the month's best metal albums, Treble's list of the year's best metal albums, and Decibel's list of the best albums of the year. In an August 2021 interview with New Noise Magazine, Nadja's Aidan Baker listed Body Void as a newer artist he enjoyed. Later that year, they joined Uniform and Portrayal of Guilt as an opener on the former's Fall tour.

In May 2022, Body Void performed at the 2022 Oblivion Access Festival, alongside Thou, 16, Dorthia Cottrell of Windhand, Jarhead Fertilizer, Soul Glo, and Vile Creature. That same month, they joined Primitive Man's 10th anniversary tour alongside Mortiferum, Jarhead Fertilizer, Elizabeth Colour Wheel, and Candlemass. In August, the band independently released the EP Burn The Homes Of Those Who Seek To Control Our Bodies, of which Invisible Oranges' Ted Nubel wrote, "Their palpable anger filters into noisy, acerbic doom like a painful dose of capsaicin, burning and twisting already heavy music into something legitimately tough to process." Ahead of this EP, Faughn was made a full member of the band.

=== Atrocity Machine (2023–present) ===
April 2023 saw the band return to Roadburn Festival, this time alongside Bell Witch, Teeth of the Sea, Bo Ningen, High Vis, OvO, Deafheaven, Boy Harsher, Cave In, Julie Christmas, Wolves in the Throne Room, Giles Corey, Chat Pile, Backxwash, KEN Mode, Have a Nice Life, and Mamaleek. In June, they joined Zao for a West Coast tour with Mouth For War and Godcollider.

In August, the band announced a fourth album titled Atrocity Machine and released the project's first single, "Flesh Market". Uniform's Ben Greenberg produced, mixed, and engineered the album, with Boatright mastering, and Primitive Man's Ethan Lee McCarthy created the artwork. Later that month, Metal Injection included "Flesh Market" in a list of "The 15 Underground Metal Bands You Might've Missed In August 2023". On September 25, they released another single, "Cop Show", with an accompanying lyric video.

Atrocity Machine was released on October 13 via Prosthetic. It appeared on month- and year-end lists of the best metal albums from PopMatters, Bandcamp Daily, Treble, CVLT Nation, The Quietus, and BrooklynVegan. McCarthy, speaking to BrooklynVegan, named the album as one of his personal favorites of the year.

In January 2024, Metal Hammer listed the band as one of "4 brilliant new metal bands you need to hear this month". In April, they performed Atrocity Machine at their third Roadburn appearance, this time alongside Health, Clipping, Kavus Torabi, Uboa, Blood Incantation, The Jesus and Mary Chain, Chelsea Wolfe, Lankum, Ragana, Drowse, Royal Thunder, Khanate, Laster, Inter Arma, Birds in Row, White Ward, and Thantifaxath. Later in the year, they performed at Northwest Terror Fest alongside Amenra, Forbidden, Giant Squid, Immortal Bird, Repulsion, Slow Crush, and Weekend Nachos. They also played the inaugural Toronto-based Prepare The Ground festival, alongside 40 Watt Sun, KEN Mode, Mares of Thrace, Marissa Nadler, Odonis Odonis, Sunrot, Drowse, Maggot Heart, North of America, Orchid, and Tomb Mold.

In May, the band joined Vermin Womb and Sissy Spacek in supporting Liturgy on their 93696 North American tour. However, on June 6, the band announced they were leaving the tour after only a week; no official reason was disclosed, and Liturgy claimed they were not informed of the decision.

== Musical style ==
Body Void's music has most often been classified as doom and sludge metal, with elements of drone metal, crust punk, black metal, death metal, noise, and industrial. (Note: Genre sources: doom metal; sludge metal; drone metal; crust punk; black metal; death metal; noise; industrial) Their early sound as Devoid was likened to black metal-influenced acts such as Oathbreaker, Deafheaven, Wolves in the Throne Room, and Behemoth. Since then, they have been credited alongside Sunrot, Thou, Primitive Man, Vile Creature, Dawn Ray'd, Dragged into Sunlight, and others as representing a new generation of metal. With the addition of soundscapist Janys-Iren Faughn as a member, the band began introducing noise, industrial, ambient, and power electronics elements to their sound, most prominently on Atrocity Machine.

The band members have cited Khanate and Vile Creature as major influences, as well as Indian, Primitive Man, Godspeed You! Black Emperor, Pupil Slicer, Dystopia, and Sunn O))). Their later industrial/noise sounds on Atrocity Machine were inspired by Killing Joke, Wolf Eyes, Pharmakon, and Controlled Bleeding. They also draw influence from poetry, hip-hop, and punk rock. Vocalist Willow Ryan has expressed personal appreciation for fellow heavy bands KEN Mode, Gridlink, Tomb Mold, and Sprain, as well as non-metal artists like Victoria Monét, Julia Byrne, Fever Ray, Yeule, and Neil Young.

Lyrically, the band's music typically features heavy, often political themes. They self-described their 2016 album Ruins as exploring "death, gender identity, depression, suicide ideation, dreams, and, of course, space". I Live Inside A Burning House (2018) saw Willow Ryan exploring more personal themes of queerness and mental illness. Following this early period, they began expanding to more outward-looking themes on later projects, such as climate crisis (Bury Me Beneath This Rotting Earth), bodily autonomy (Burn The Homes Of Those Who Seek To Control Our Bodies), and on Atrocity Machine, late capitalism, police brutality, and the prison-industrial complex. For the latter project, Ryan took inspiration from films like Tetsuo: The Iron Man, Akira, and the work of Paul Verhoeven, as well as the novels of William Gibson, Philip K. Dick, and Kurt Vonnegut.

== Side projects ==
- In 2018, Willow and Parker Ryan formed the sludge metal band Atone, with Ura and Zak McCune of the band Swamp Witch. They released a self-titled EP via Transylvanian Tapes.
- Willow Ryan and producer/Keeper frontman Jacob Lee collaborate as the duo Hellish Form, performing funeral doom with elements of goth and post-punk. They released a debut EP in 2020, followed by a four-song album, Remains, the following year on Translation Loss Records.

== Members ==
=== Current ===
- Willow Ryan – vocals, guitar, bass (2014–present), electronics (2023–present)
- Eddie Holgerson – drums (2014–present)
- Janys-Iren Faughn – noise, electronics, samples (2022–present)

=== Former ===
- Parker Ryan – bass (2014–2019)

=== Touring ===
- Jacob Lee – guitar (2023–present)
- Janys-Iren Faughn – bass (2019–2022)

== Discography ==
=== Studio albums ===
Year	Title	Label
2016	Ruins	Transylvanian
2018	I Live Inside a Burning House	Seeing Red / Crown & Throne / Dry Cough
2021	Bury Me Beneath This Rotting Earth	Prosthetic/Tridroid
2023	Atrocity Machine	Prosthetic

=== Extended plays ===
- Demo (2014) (as Devoid)
- II (2015) (as Devoid)
- Ruins (2016) (as Devoid)
- You Will Know The Fear You Forced Upon Us (2019; Seeing Red/Crown & Throne/Dry Cough)
- Burn The Homes Of Those Who Seek To Control Our Bodies (2022; independent)

=== Split albums ===
- Body Void/Keeper (2020; Roman Numeral/Tridroid)
- Sunrot/Body Void (2024; Riff Merchant)

=== Compilations ===
- I & II (2015; Transylvanian Tapes) (as Devoid)

=== Singles ===
- "Patriarch Scum" (2015) (as Devoid)
- "Haunted" (2018)
- "Given" (2018)
- "Wound" (2021)
- "Fawn" (2021)
- "Flesh Market" (2023)
- "Cop Show" (2023)
- "Human Greenhouse" (2023)

=== Music videos ===
- "Wound" (2021; dir. Chariot of Black Moth)
- "Flesh Market" (2023; dir. Body Void)
