= List of sludge metal bands =

This is a list of bands that play sludge metal, or sludge, a genre of extreme music that originated through combining elements of doom metal and hardcore punk.

== List of artists ==
Band	Formed	Origin	Notes
16	1992	United States	
Acid Bath	1991	United States	
Agrimonia	2005	Sweden	Also classed as crust punk and post-metal.
Alice in Chains	1987	United States	Also classed as grunge, alternative metal, alternative rock, and doom metal.
Alien Boys	1987	Germany	Also classed as grunge and doom metal
Amenra	1999	Belgium	Also classed as post-metal.
Baroness	2003	United States	Also classed as progressive metal and stoner metal.
Big Business	2004	United States	Also classed as stoner metal.
Bison B.C.	2006	Canada	Also classed as stoner metal and doom metal.
Black Flag	1976	United States	Notable for the creation of sludge metal with the album My War. Generally described as hardcore punk.
Black Tusk	2005	United States	Also classed as stoner rock/metal and hardcore punk.
Blood Circus	1988	United States	
Body Void	2014	United States	Also classed as doom metal.
Bongzilla	1995	United States	Also classed as stoner rock/metal.
Boris	1992	Japan	Also classed as experimental metal and drone metal.
Burning Witch	1995	United States	Also classed as doom metal and stoner doom.
Buzzoven	1990	United States	
Cavity	1992	United States	
Cattle	2012	United Kingdom	
Celeste	2005	France	Also classed as post-hardcore and black metal.
Chat Pile	2019	United States	Also classed as noise rock.
Conan	2006	United Kingdom	Also classed as doom metal.
Conjurer	2014	United Kingdom	Also classed as post-metal and doom metal.
Corrosion of Conformity	1982	United States	Also classed as stoner rock/metal and southern metal.
Corrupted	1994	Japan	Also classed as doom metal and drone metal.
Crowbar	1990	United States	
Cult of Luna	1998	Sweden	Also classed as post-metal and doom metal.
Cultura Tres	2006	Venezuela	Also classed as doom metal and groove metal.
Down	1991	United States	Also classed as southern metal and stoner metal.
Downthesun	1999	United States	Also classed as nu metal and alternative metal.
Dragpipe	2001	United States	Also classed as alternative metal, nu metal, and stoner rock.
DVNE	2013	United Kingdom	Also classed as post-metal and progressive metal.
Dystopia	1991	United States	Also classed as crust punk.
Eyehategod	1988	United States	
Fudge Tunnel	1988	United Kingdom	Also classed as noise rock and alternative metal.
Gaza	2004	United States	Also classed as mathcore and grindcore.
Godflesh	1988	United Kingdom	Also classed as industrial metal and experimental metal.
Graves at Sea	2002	United States	Also classed as doom metal.
Greenmachine	1995	Japan	Also classed as stoner metal.
Grief	1991	United States	
Harkonen	1997	United States	Also classed as post-hardcore and math rock.
Harvey Milk	1992	United States	
Helms Alee	2007	United States	Also classed as post-hardcore, noise rock, shoegaze, and stoner metal.
High on Fire	1998	United States	Also classed as stoner metal, doom metal, and thrash metal.
Isis	1997	United States	Also classed as post-metal.
Iron Monkey	1994	United Kingdom	
Jucifer	1993	United States	Also classed as noise rock.
Keelhaul	1997	United States	Also classed as mathcore and post-hardcore.
KEN Mode	1999	Canada	Also classed as noise rock and post-hardcore.
Kingdom of Sorrow	2005	United States	Also classed as metalcore.
Knut	1994	Switzerland	Also classed as mathcore.
Kylesa	2001	United States	Also classed as stoner rock/metal.
Lody Kong	2011	United States	Also classed as hardcore punk, grunge and thrash metal.
Lair of the Minotaur	2003	United States	Also classed as thrash metal.
Mantar	2012	Germany	
Mastodon	2000	United States	Also classed as progressive metal and stoner metal.
Melvins	1983	United States	Also classed as alternative rock, experimental rock, grunge, noise rock, and stoner rock.
Mico de Noche	2001	United States	Also classed as stoner metal.
Minsk	2002	United States	Also classed as post-metal and doom metal.
Mistress	1999	United Kingdom	Also classed as grindcore and death metal.
Neurosis	1985	United States	Also classed as post-metal.
Nightstick	1992	United States	Also classed as noise rock and acid rock.
Norma Jean	1997	United States	Also classed as mathcore, metalcore, post-hardcore, and nu metal (early, as Luti-Kriss).
The Ocean	2000	Germany	Also classed as progressive metal, post-metal, and experimental metal.
Old Man Gloom	1999	United States	Also classed as post-metal.
Part Chimp	2000	United Kingdom	Also classed as noise rock.
Raging Speedhorn	1998	United Kingdom	Also classed as extreme metal, hardcore punk, stoner metal, and nu metal (early).
Raw Radar War	2002	United States	Also classed as hardcore punk and crust punk.
Red Fang	2005	United States	Also classed as stoner rock/metal.
Sofa King Killer	1999	United States	Also classed as stoner rock/metal.
Shallow North Dakota	1993	Canada	Also classed as noise rock.
Soilent Green	1988	United States	Also classed as grindcore.
Sourvein	1993	United States	Also classed as doom metal.
Stake	2004	Belgium	Also classed as post-rock/metal.
Sumac	2014	Canada / United States	Also classed as post-metal.
Sunrot	2013	United States	Also classed as doom metal.
Superjoint Ritual	1993	United States	Also classed as hardcore punk.
Thou	2005	United States	
Torche	2004	United States	Also classed as stoner rock/metal and alternative rock.
Totimoshi	1999	United States	Also classed as noise rock, alternative rock, stoner rock/metal, and alternative metal.
Trenches	2007	United States	Also classed as metalcore.
Twitching Tongues	2009	United States	Also classed as groove metal and metalcore.
Unpersons	1997	United States	Also classed as hardcore, stoner rock/metal, doom metal, and noise rock.
Vorvaň	2009	Russia	Also classed as hardcore punk.
Weedeater	1998	United States	Also classed as stoner metal.
Whores	2010	United States	Also classed as noise rock.
Willard	1989	United States	Also classed as grunge, doom metal, and alternative metal.
Will Haven	1995	United States	Also classed as metalcore, post-hardcore, and alternative metal.
Year of No Light	2001	France	Also classed as post-metal and post-rock.
Zozobra	2006	United States	Also classed as post-metal.
