= Sunrot =

American sludge metal band, formed 2013

- Origin: North Jersey, New Jersey, U.S.
- Genres: Sludge metal, doom metal
- Years active: 2013–present
- Label: Prosthetic
- Members: Lex Santiago; Christopher Eustaquio; Rob Gonzalez; Alex Dobrowolski; Ross Bradley
- Website: sunrot.bandcamp.com

Sunrot is an American sludge metal band formed in 2013 in Northern New Jersey. It consist of vocalist/noise artist Lex Santiago, guitarists Christopher Eustaquio and Rob Gonzalez, drummer Alex Dobrowolski, and bassist Ross Bradley. They have released two projects on Prosthetic Records, The Unfailing Rope (2023) and the EP Passages (2025).

== History ==
=== Formation and Sunnata (2013–2021) ===
Sunrot was formed in 2013 in the North Jersey region of New Jersey. Vocalist Lex Santiago, having moved back to the state after undergoing drug rehabilitation in Florida, recruited drummer Rob Gonzalez and guitarist Christopher Eustaquio after seeing them in local bands Furnace Head and Thera Roya. Across 2015 and 2016, they played shows with U.S. Christmas, Cavity, Grief, and Full of Hell. Early in their career, they reportedly opened for Listener and Birds in Row.

They released their first full-length album, Sunnata, on August 3, 2017, premiered via Vice's Noisey website. The album's first-day sales were contributed to a Bandcamp donation drive for the Transgender Law Center. That same month, they embarked on a summer tour with Philadelphia band God Root. Following the release of Sunnata, the band added new drummer Alex Dobrowolski, while Gonzalez switched to guitar.

In 2018, the band played a Fourth of July date with Amenra at Saint Vitus on the latter's North American tour, and in September, they performed alongside Uniform and Thou at the Knitting Factory for the latter's Magus album release party.

Sunrot performed in February 2019 at Black Flags Over Brooklyn, an anti-fascist extreme metal festival organized by journalist Kim Kelly, alongside bands including Dawn Ray'd and Racetraitor. They also contributed to Kelly's Riffs for Reproductive Justice compilation album, released the following July, which featured many of the same acts as well as Emma Ruth Rundle, Svalbard, and Planning for Burial and benefited the National Network of Abortion Funds and the Yellowhammer Fund. That same month, they were included in Revolver's monthly "Artists You Need to Know" feature. Later in the year, they opened shows for City of Caterpillar and Pig Destroyer.

=== Signing to Prosthetic and The Unfailing Rope (2021–present) ===
The band released a split album with the punk band Ides in May 2021, on which they covered Black Flag's "Fix Me". Around this time, the band added bassist Ross Bradley. In February 2022, it was announced that Sunrot had signed to Prosthetic Records, and they released the single "21%" concurrent with the announcement. In April, they appeared on a Thou tribute album, Heavier Than Thou, benefiting House of Tulip, alongside Cloud Rat, Aseethe, Cowardice. The following summer, they toured with Vile Creature, beginning with a show at Saint Vitus.

In early 2023, the band performed with Imperial Triumphant and appeared on The HIRS Collective's album We're Still Here. Both acts also joined Sunrot at the inaugural Subterranean Dissonance Fest, which also included Liturgy, Horrendous, Thantifaxath, Pyrrhon, Umbra Vitae, and John Frum among others. On February 2, the band released the single "Gutter", featuring Thou members Bryan Funck and Emily McWilliams, and announced an upcoming second album titled The Unfailing Rope. The album also featured Pig Destroyer's Blake Harrison and was produced by Scot Moriarty and mastered by Cult of Luna's Magnus Lindberg. The album's recording saw a number of setbacks, including Santiago being hospitalized due to a psychotic episode. The following month, they released a second single, "Patricide", and the album itself was released on April 7 via Prosthetic. Tom Morgan of Invisible Oranges included The Unfailing Rope as an honorable mention on his list of the Top Albums of 2023. In October, they performed at the Slower & Harder Fest alongside Weedeater, Bongripper, Portrayal of Guilt, and Dorthia Cottrell.

In May and June 2024, Sunrot played the inaugural Toronto-based Prepare The Ground festival, alongside 40 Watt Sun, KEN Mode, Mares of Thrace, Marissa Nadler, Odonis Odonis, Body Void, Drowse, Maggot Heart, North of America, Orchid, and Tomb Mold. The following two months, they toured the East Coast and Midwest with Ragana.

The band released a new EP, Passages, on January 24, 2025, on Prosthetic. The EP features contributions from Full of Hell vocalist Dylan Walker, Cloud Rat drummer Brandon Hill, and a vocal sample from musician Sun Ra. The following spring, they co-headlined a US tour with The Body. They also performed in June at Mutants of the Monster Festival in Little Rock, Arkansas, sharing a lineup with bands including Rwake, Pallbearer, The Body, Royal Thunder, The Atlas Moth, and Exhorder.

== Musical style ==
Sunrot's music has been labeled sludge metal, doom metal, noise, post-metal, and grindcore, with elements of harsh noise, industrial, drone, punk/hardcore, and black metal. Their sound has been compared to artists including Neurosis, Amenra, Swans, Eyehategod, Sunn O))), Electric Wizard, The Body, Dragged into Sunlight, and High on Fire. The website CVLT Nation has listed them alongside acts like Thou, Primitive Man, Vile Creature, Dawn Ray'd, and Body Void as part of a newer generation of metal bands.

On the subject of influences, guitarist Christopher Eustaquio described their debut album Sunnata as "total Neurosis worship". The members have expressed admiration for artists including Kristin Hayter, Emma Ruth Rundle, King Woman, Jenna Pup of The HIRS Collective, Dreamcrusher, King Vision Ultra of PTP, Soul Glo, Moor Mother, Gel, Danzig, Ill Niño, and Discharge. For The Unfailing Rope, they pointed to Indian's From All Purity, Sleep's The Sciences, Rundle's Engine of Hell, and Amenra's Mass VI as inspirations.

The band's lyrics often address dark themes such as depression, psychosis, suicide, trauma, grief, bigotry, toxic masculinity, colonialism, and ecocide, albeit with a sense of humor and an optimistic outlook. Bassist Ross Bradley described The Unfailing Rope as being broadly about "hurt and healing in one way or another. Healing from childhood trauma, mental health crises, the trauma of colonialism and extractive capitalism. The way we tend to write is to hold a mirror up to some really ugly truth in ourselves or our world and try to explore a way out. I think that hurt and that hope is present in the music and lyrics of basically every song on here."

== Side projects ==
According to a 2024 interview with CVLT Nation, several members have other musical projects: guitarist Rob Gonzalez is in the death grind band Unhinge, bassist Ross Bradley is in the drone metal band Quiet Man, and vocalist Lex Santiago has a solo noise project under the name Skin Pop.

== Members ==
- Lex Santiago – vocals, noise (2013–present)
- Christopher Eustaquio – guitar (2013–present)
- Rob Gonzalez – drums (2013–2017), guitar (2017–present)
- Alex Dobrowolski – drums (2017–present)
- Ross Bradley – bass (2021–present)

== Discography ==
=== Studio albums ===
Year	Title	Label
2017	Sunnata	Independent
2023	The Unfailing Rope	Prosthetic

=== Extended plays ===
Year	Title	Label
2014	Sunrot	Ouro Preto
2020	Dialectical	Independent
2025	Passages	Prosthetic

=== Split albums ===
Year	Title	Split with	Label
2015	Inertia. / Sunrot	Inertia.	Ouro Preto
2021	Sunrot // Ides Split	Ides	Independent
2022	Heavier Than Thou	Aseethe, Cloud Rat, Cowardice, Hell, Chained to the Bottom of the Ocean	Riff Merchant
2024	Sunrot // Body Void	Body Void	Riff Merchant

=== Singles ===
Year	Title	Album
2014	"SPF666"	Non-album single
2022	"21%"	Non-album single
2023	"Gutter" (ft. Bryan Funck & Emily McWilliams)	The Unfailing Rope
2023	"Patricide" (ft. Blake Harrison)	The Unfailing Rope
2023	"Trepanation" (ft. Scot Moriarty)	The Unfailing Rope

=== Music videos ===
Year	Title	Director
2022	"Molt (This Feels Like Death)"	Sunrot
2023	"Gutter"	Nicolle Maroulis & Sunrot
2023	”Patricide”	Ross Bradley
2023	"Trepanation"	Sunrot
2025	"The First Wound"	Ross Bradley
