= Ride the Void =

Studio album by Holy Grail
- Released: January 18, 2013
- Genre: Heavy metal
- Length: 53:06
- Label: Nuclear Blast, Prosthetic
- Producer: Matt Hyde

Holy Grail chronology
Crisis in Utopia (2010)	Ride the Void (2013)	Times of Pride and Peril (2016)

Professional ratings
Review scores
Source	Rating
Blabbermouth.net	7.5/10
Brave Words & Bloody Knuckles	8/10
Under the Gun Review	8.5/10

Ride the Void is the second studio album by American heavy metal band Holy Grail, released in 2013 in Europe through Nuclear Blast and in North America through Prosthetic Records.

== Track listing ==
All tracks are written by Holy Grail

No.	Title	Length
1.	"Archeus" (instrumental)	2:15
2.	"Bestia Triumphans"	5:48
3.	"Dark Passenger"	4:11
4.	"Bleeding Stone"	4:20
5.	"Ride the Void"	4:30
6.	"Too Decayed to Wait"	4:12
7.	"Crosswinds"	4:07
8.	"Take It to the Grave"	3:49
9.	"Sleep of Virtue"	4:49
10.	"Silence the Scream"	5:29
11.	"The Great Artifice"	3:49
12.	"Wake Me When It's Over" (instrumental)	1:15
13.	"Rains of Sorrow"	4:32
Total length:		53:06

Bonus track
No.	Title	Length
14.	"Can't Hide the Wolf"	4:01
Total length:		57:07

== Personnel ==
=== Holy Grail ===
- Alex Lee – guitars
- James Paul Luna – vocals
- Eli Santana – guitars, vocals
- Tyler Meahl – drums
- Blake Mount – bass

=== Additional personnel ===
- Giovanna Maraga Clayton – cello on "Ride the Void" and "Wake Me When It's Over"
- Matt Hyde – producer, recording
- Mike Bax – photography
- Jessica Luna – photography
- Angela Boatwright – photography
- Jeff McDonough – string orchestration
- Richard Barron - string arrangements on "Wake Me When It's Over"
- Alan Douches – mastering
- Chris Rakestraw – engineering
- Mark Lewis – mixing
- Dylan Cole – cover art
