= Ode to the Flame =

Studio album by Mantar
- Released: 15 April 2016
- Genre: Sludge metal, extreme metal
- Length: 44:05
- Label: Nuclear Blast (CD); Tower Records (Vinyl)

Mantar chronology
Death by Burning (2013)	Ode to the Flame (2016)	The Modern Art of Setting Ablaze (2018)

Ode to the Flame is the second studio album by a German sludge metal band Mantar which was released by Nuclear Blast on 15 April 2016.

== Release ==
Mantar made his first announcement of Ode to the Flame on 27 January 2016. On 24 March 2016, Mantar began streaming audio snippets for the tracks featured on their announced album, Ode to the Flame. A limited vinyl LP was released by Tower Records the same year.

== Reception ==
Professional ratings
Review scores
Source	Rating
Dead Rhetoric	7.5/10
Distorted Sound	7/10
Metal.de	7/10
Metal Hammer	4/5 stars
Metal Wani	8/10
New Noise Magazine	4.5/5 stars
The Austin Chronicle	3.5/5 stars
The Metal Observer	8/10

In a review for Distorted Sound, James Halstead said that "the real strength of Ode to the Flame is its diversity in sonic assault". Joseph Collins of the CVLT Nation said that "with the release of their venomous sophomore release entitled Ode to the Flame on Nuclear Blast, Mantar are poised to salt the earth and burn everything within their sight". In his closing comments, Yidu Sun of Metal Wani, said that "'Ode to the Flame' is a crushing, appropriately melodic, and dynamic sludge metal album that is intelligent and mature but lacks in personality". Shawn Miller of The Metal Observer said that "'Ode to the Flame' is a step in the right direction for Mantar" and added that "[the album] offers much to enjoy and will definitely be a contender for many year end best of lists".

== Track listing ==
Ode to the Flame track listing
No.	Title	Length
1.	"Carnal Rising"	2:33
2.	"Praise the Plague"	4:21
3.	"Era Borealis"	4:01
4.	"The Hint"	5:03
5.	"Born Reversed"	3:28
6.	"Oz"	3:27
7.	"I, Omen"	4:51
8.	"Cross the Cross"	4:42
9.	"Schwanenstein"	6:24
10.	"Sundowning"	5:15
Total length:		44:05

== Personnel ==
- Hanno Klänhardt – vocals, guitar
- Erinç Sakarya – drums

== Charts ==
Chart performance for Ode to the Flame
Chart (2016)	Peak position
German Albums (Offizielle Top 100)	7
