= Improper Burial =

EP by Holy Grail
- Released: November 19, 2009
- Genre: Heavy metal
- Length: 7:18
- Label: Prosthetic Records
- Producer: Chris Rakestraw

Holy Grail EP chronology
Improper Burial (2009)	Seasons Bleedings (2011)

Improper Burial is an EP by Holy Grail released in 2009 under Prosthetic Records.

== Track listing ==
No.	Title	Length
1.	"Fight to Kill"	3:23
2.	"Immortal Man"	3:55
Total length:		7:18

CD bonus tracks
No.	Title	Length
3.	"Exciter" (Judas Priest cover)	4:13
4.	"Fast as a Shark" (Accept cover)	3:45
Total length:		15:16

== Personnel ==
- Blake Mount - bass
- Tyler Meahl - drums
- Eli Santana - guitars
- James Paul Luna - vocals
- James J. LaRue - guitars

=== Additional personnel ===
- Ed Repka - cover art
- Chris Rakestraw - producer, mixing
- Relyt Lhaem - mixing
- Carson Slovak - layout
