= Immortal Bird =

American blackened death metal band

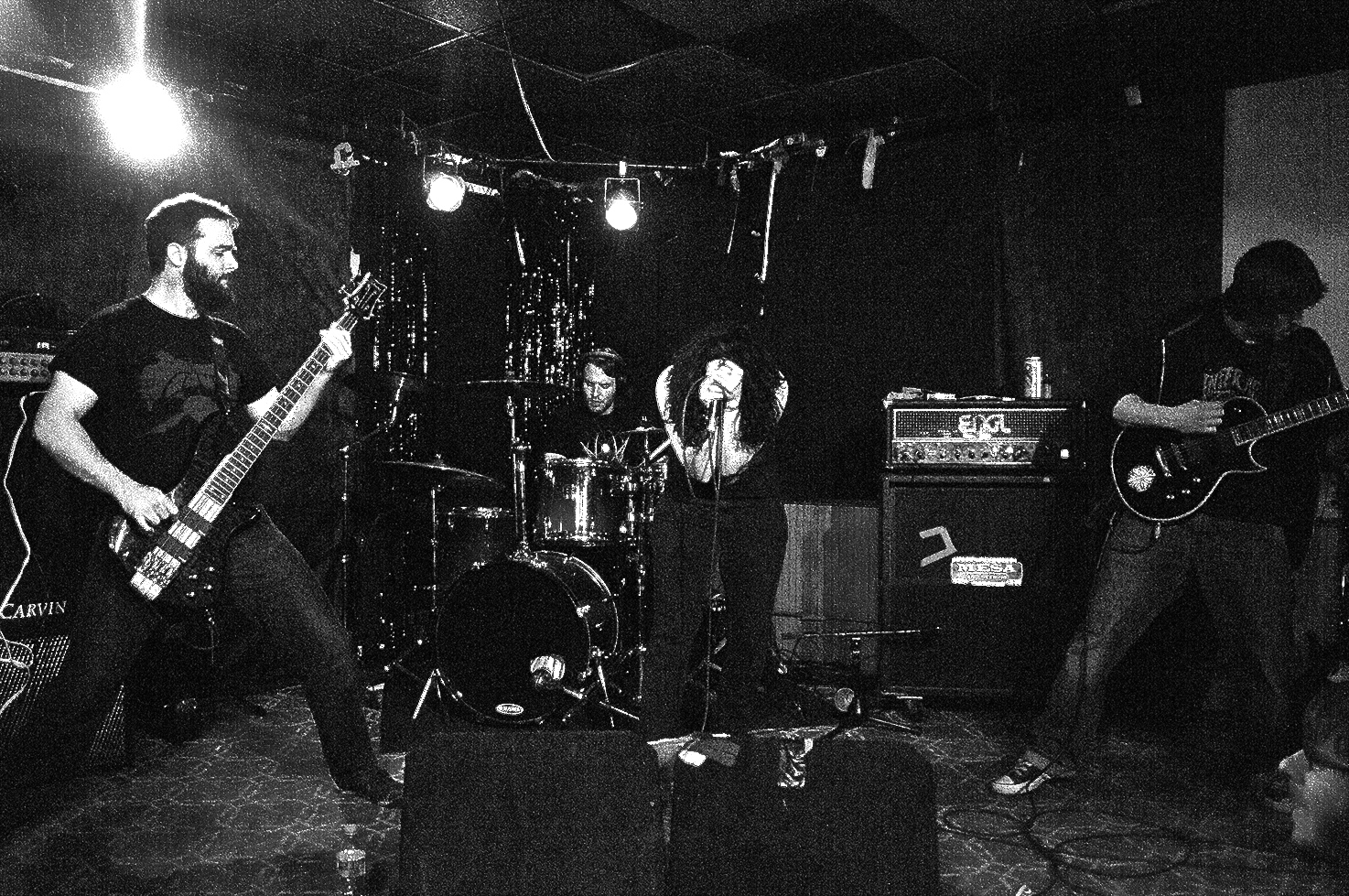
- Immortal Bird in Minneapolis, Minnesota, 2015

Background information
- Origin: Chicago, Illinois, United States
- Genres: Blackened death metal
- Years active: 2013–present
- Labels: 20 Buck Spin, Manatee Rampage
- Members: Rae Amitay; John Picillo; Nate Madden; Matt Korajczyk

Immortal Bird is an American blackened death metal band made up of Rae Amitay, John Picillo, Nate Madden and Matt Korajczyk. They are from Chicago, Illinois. Their music is influenced by grindcore, progressive metal, and post-metal. The band was formed in 2013 with the intention of being a recording project, but has evolved into an actively touring and collaborative group.

== History ==
Immortal Bird was formed in early 2013 by drummer/vocalist and Berklee College of Music graduate Rae Amitay (formerly of JUNO-winning metal band Woods of Ypres and Polaris Prize nominated Mares of Thrace) as a writing project between themselves and guitarist/arranger Evan Berry. Following the addition of bassist John Picillo, the band recorded their debut EP, Akrasia at Lo-Tech Laboratories where it was then mixed by Kurt Ballou and mastered by Brad Boatright. The EP was released on December 3, 2013, and debuted on the Decibel magazine website to critical acclaim, calling it "dark and twisting, Akrasia refuses to be pigeonholed. Often proggy, sometimes doomy, and other times quite beautiful, it offers surprises around every sudden corner." The band quickly garnered a hometown following as well, with the Chicago Reader calling it "sick and greasy black metal that does an admirable job inventing the sound of a mind tearing itself apart." The band was also featured in Kerrang! where it was lauded as "one of the most ferocious things you'll hear in 2014. Immortal Bird have delivered a septic, gnawing, and phenomenal debut here." Immortal Bird then embarked on a series of North American tours, including brief runs with Mortals, as well as Krieg, and Occultist in the United States. They also made an appearance at the inaugural Southern Darkness Fest in August 2014. The band recorded their full-length debut, Empress/Abscess, in February 2015 with Pete Grossmann at Bricktop Recording Studio where it was then mixed and mastered by Colin Marston. The album was released worldwide on vinyl and cassette by Broken Limbs Recordings on July 14, 2015 and digitally/CD by Amitay's own Manatee Rampage Recordings. The first single, "Neoplastic" debuted via Decibel magazine and featured a guest vocal performance from John Hoffman of the renowned powerviolence/grind band Weekend Nachos. Amitay noted, "I never envisioned having a guest vocalist when we were writing the album, but John has such an aggressive, inimitable voice and killer presence that I just had to ask! I think it adds something very cool to the track and I'm stoked he was a part of it." The album's track "Saprophyte" was premiered by NPR and hailed as "find[ing] the sweet spot between guitarist Kurt Ballou's menacing melodies for Converge, The Dillinger Escape Plan's battle-ready tech-metal, and Carcass' unrelenting (and often catchy) death-metal-spiked grindcore." Empress/Abscess was praised by Adrien Begrand of PopMatters, saying, "It's hateful, violent, and at times strikingly beautiful.” Following the album's release, the band toured the West coast of the United States in October 2015, including a main stage performance at Southwest Terror Fest alongside Landmine Marathon, Dropdead, Sleep, and more.

== Present ==
As of April 2016, the band has added drummer Matt Korajczyk and guitarist Nate Madden to their live lineup and are currently writing new material. Immortal Bird completed a co-headlining Southern US tour with the Brooklyn-based experimental metal band Pyrrhon in April 2016, followed by the announcement of more extensive summer touring with Seattle grind band Theories (Metal Blade) and InAeona (Prosthetic) and appearances at 71Grind Fest in Colorado Springs, CO and Crucialfest in Salt Lake City, UT. In February 2017, they embarked on an Eastern US/Canadian tour with the experimental death/doom band Withered (Season of Mist). In October/November 2017, they completed their first European/UK tour, playing fifteen shows and two festivals (Damnation Prefest in Leeds, UK and Bilbao Deathfest in Bilbao, Spain). In November 2018 it was announced that they would be releasing a new album in 2019 through 20 Buck Spin. The album Thrive on Neglect was released summer of 2019.

== Band members ==
Current members

- Rae Amitay – vocals, drums(2013–present)
- John Picillo– bass guitar (2013–2024)
- Nate Madden - guitar (2015–present)
- Matt Korajczyk – drums (2016–present)

Former members

- Evan Berry – guitar/arranging (2013–2015)
- Eric Kornfeind – live guitars (2014-2015)
- Garry Naples (Novembers Doom) – live drums/studio drums on Empress/Abscess (2014-2015)

== Discography ==
=== Studio albums ===
- Akrasia EP (2013)
- Empress/Abscess (2015)
- Thrive on Neglect (2019)
- Sin Querencia (2024)
