= Derivae =

Studio album by Nero di Marte
- Released: 28 October 2014
- Recorded: May–June 2014
- Studio: Studio 73, Ravenna, Italy
- Genre: Post-metal, Technical death metal
- Length: 56:50
- Label: Prosthetic Records

Nero di Marte chronology
| Nero di Marte (2013) | Derivae (2014) |

Derivae is the second studio album from the Italian post-metal band Nero di Marte. The album was released on October 28, 2014 through Prosthetic Records, and recorded at Studio 72 in Ravenna, Italy from May–June 2014.

== Musical style and writing ==
In an interview, Sean Worrell said that "We try to interpret the mood and the atmosphere of what we are playing, as if the sounds were speaking to us and we need to translate that into written language." A number of music critics have compared the album's style to Ulcerate, Gorguts, Meshuggah, and Gojira for the heavy atmosphere, dissonant and technical guitarwork, and dynamic song structures which make significant use of soft, heavy, slow, and fast sections.

== Critical reception ==
The album received positive reviews from music critics. Many critics noted the impressive use of percussion, the use of dynamics within the song structures, and the heavy atmospheric sound. MetalSucks wrote that the band's "sense of dynamics and timely mellowness help the band pack a stronger punch", and praised the emotional depth of the album.

Sputnik Music's Ben Kuettel also praised the dynamic songs, directing particular praise at the closing track, describing it as the band's "greatest achievement yet". He wrote that "it delicately weaves together all components of the album while simultaneously bringing its contrasting elements to an apocalyptic and stunning end. Guitar riff after riff follow each other, building and exploding into intensity before calming down again for one of the greatest and most dynamic guitar leads of the album. It continues to build in atmosphere and intensity until ultimately descending into special effects and atmospherics."

Professional ratings
Review scores
| Source | Rating |
|---|---|
| Metal Hammer | 4/5 stars |
| MetalSucks | 4/5 stars |
| Sputnik Music | 4/5 |

== Track listing ==
| No. | Title | Length |
|---|---|---|
| 1. | "L'eclisse" | 8:13 |
| 2. | "Clouded Allure" | 6:04 |
| 3. | "Pulsar" | 8:29 |
| 4. | "Dite" | 6:30 |
| 5. | "Simulacra" | 8:20 |
| 6. | "Il Diluvio" | 9:00 |
| 7. | "Those Who Leave" | 10:14 |

== Personnel ==
Personnel adapted from AllMusic credits.

- Sean Worrell - guitars, vocals
- Francesco D'adamo - guitars
- Andrea Burgio - bass
- Marco Bolognini - percussion
- Riccardo Pasini - engineering, mastering, mixing
- Alex Eckman-Lawn - artwork
