= Holy Grail (band) =

American heavy metal band

- Also known as: Sorcerer (founding name)
- Origin: Pasadena, California, U.S.
- Genres: Heavy metal
- Years active: 2008–2022
- Labels: Nuclear Blast, Prosthetic
- Members: James Paul Luna; Tyler Meahl; Blake Mount; Eli Santana; Donald Penn
- Past members: James J. LaRue; Eric Harris; Alex Lee
- Website: holygrailofficial.com

Holy Grail was an American heavy metal band from Pasadena, California, formed in 2008.

== History ==
Holy Grail was formed in 2008 as Sorcerer by singer James Paul Luna, lead guitarist James J. LaRue and drummer Tyler Meahl, all ex-members of White Wizzard. They recruited rhythm guitarist Eli Santana and bassist Eric Harris (formerly of Skeletonwitch) to complete the lineup. Before Holy Grail recorded their first extended play, bassist Blake Mount replaced Harris.

In 2009, the band released their first EP, Improper Burial, on Prosthetic Records. They went on to release their first full-length album, Crisis in Utopia, in 2010, to critical acclaim. The cover art for Crisis in Utopia was created by Andrei Bouzikov.

The band toured heavily from 2009 to 2012 in support of their first album. In November 2009, they supported 3 Inches of Blood and Saviours on a North American tour. In April 2010, they supported Amon Amarth on their North American tour. In June, they performed at the UK's Download Festival. In July 2010, bassist Jessie Sanchez took Blake Mount's place in the band; in October of that year, Mount returned to the band Marcel and Sanchez left. In August, the band performed at Germany's Wacken Open Air Festival. They then began their third North American tour, supporting Exodus.

In October 2010, the band parted ways with LaRue, replacing him with guitarist Ian Scott for the next few months. Scott's first performance with the band took place at Japan's Loud Park Festival. In December, the band toured North America for the fourth time, this time supporting Blind Guardian. In February 2011, the band toured North America again, supporting Eluveitie alongside 3 Inches of Blood. In March, the band embarked on a headlining tour of the UK, supported by Revoker.

In April 2011, the band parted ways with Scott, replacing him with guitarist Alex Lee (formerly of Bonded by Blood). The band then began its first headlining tour of North America, with support from Cauldron in the US (Holy Grail supported Cauldron on Canadian dates). In September, they toured North American again, this time supporting Toxic Holocaust. They released their second EP, Season's Bleedings, in December 2011.

In February 2012, the band performed at Australia's Soundwave festival. In March, they supported Saviours on another North American tour, including a performance at Austin's South by Southwest festival. In May, they supported DragonForce on their North American tour, alongside Huntress. In June, they supported Valient Thorr on their North American tour, alongside Royal Thunder. In October 2012, they supported Hellyeah on their North American tour.

The band's second full-length album, Ride the Void, was released on January 22, 2013. It was released in North America by Prosthetic Records and in Europe by Nuclear Blast. Shortly after the release of Ride the Void, the band embarked on the Metal Alliance Tour, with Anthrax headlining, along with Exodus, Municipal Waste, High on Fire, and Shadows Fall.

Sometime in 2022, James Paul Luna left the band and formed the band Intranced.

== Musical style ==
While the band's sound is rooted in traditional heavy metal of the 1980s, their music also contains modern metal elements. Rock Hard's Boris Kaiser compared Holy Grail to Trivium, 3 Inches of Blood, Sanctity, and DragonForce. AllMusic described the band as playing traditional or retro heavy metal with thrash influences. The band's lyrics deal with death, terror and other typical metal themes.

Frontman Luna described Holy Grail as "a modern band with a new twist of old-school metal with death metal riffs, modern breakdowns, and power-metal singing".

== Discography ==
=== Studio albums ===
- Crisis in Utopia (2010)
- Ride the Void (2013)
- Times of Pride and Peril (2016)

=== Extended plays ===
- Improper Burial (2009)
- Seasons Bleedings (2011)

=== Compilation albums ===
- Label Showcase – Prosthetic Records (2012)

=== Singles ===
- My Last Attack (2010)
- Dark Passenger (2012)

== Members ==
Current members

- James Paul Luna – vocals (2008–2022)
- Eli Santana – rhythm guitar (2008–2022)
- Tyler Meahl – drums (2008–2022)
- Blake Mount – bass (2008–2010, 2010–2022)
- Donald Penn – lead guitar (2022–2022)

Former members

- James LaRue – lead guitar (2008–2010)
- Eric Harris – bass (2008)
- Alex Lee – lead guitar (2011–2022)

Touring members

- Ian Scott – lead guitar (2010–2011)
- Jessie Sanchez – bass (2010)
- Marcel Monroy – drums (2009–2014)

== See also ==
- List of heavy metal bands
- List of Nuclear Blast artists
- List of Prosthetic Records artists
- Music of California
