= Bonded by Blood (disambiguation) =

Bonded by Blood may refer to:

- Bonded by Blood (band), an American thrash metal band
- Bonded by Blood, an album by the California thrash metal band Exodus
- Bonded by Blood (film), a 2010 film starring Adam Deacon
- Bonded by Blood (poster), a limited edition poster for the All Blacks rugby team
