= No Clean Singing =

American heavy metal website

- Website type: Music, news and media
- Headquarters: Seattle, Washington, U.S.
- Owner: Islander
- Creators: Islander; Alexis; IntoTheDarkness
- Website: nocleansinging.com
- Registration: Optional
- Launched: November 2009; 16 years ago

No Clean Singing is an American heavy metal news and media website based in Seattle. The website primarily covers extreme music, with a focus on various forms of Death Metal, Black Metal, Hardcore, Sludge, and Doom Metal, especially those featuring "bands with vocalists who exclusively scream, growl, or otherwise avoid melodic, 'traditional' singing".

Their primary focus, however, remains bands who err towards the heavier and/or more extreme end of the spectrum, especially those who have less mainstream exposure, and the ethos of the site is to avoid outwardly negative reviews in favour of "...[writing] about music I liked and wanted to recommend [...] [and] to support music I enjoy rather than tell people what they shouldn't listen to or make fun of bands."

== History ==
No Clean Singing was founded in November 2009 by Islander, Alexis, and IntoTheDarkness.

The site was originally named as a tongue-in-cheek reference to Islander's dislike of Bury Your Dead vocalist Myke Terry's switch to a more stereotypical mix of "good cop/bad cop" harsh and clean vocals, which he considered part of "an awful trend".

However, Islander has also stated on several occasions that the name has evolved even more into an in-joke, as they frequently make "exceptions to the rule" for bands like Ulver, Green Carnation, Caronte, etc.

As of 2025 the core staff of the blog compraises editor Islander, deputy-editor Andy Synn (who joined the site in 2010), and long-time fan-favourite writer DGR (who joined the site in 2011), but also features frequent contributions from guest writers in multiple US cities, as well as countries like France, Norway, and Slovenia.

In a May 2016 interview, Islander reported that No Clean Singing had received 1.1 million page views and about 260,000 users in the previous six months, with 40% of its internet traffic coming from the United States.

Some of the site's most popular posts feature artists like Gojira (35,000 views), Devin Townsend (17,000 views) and Cattle Decapitation (17,000 views), but the site has also been instrumental in promoting the works of more underground acts such as Body Void, Allegaeon, Spectral Wound, and more.

Although the site itself does not feature any advertising, Islander has had to pay to promote the site on Facebook; he has publicly criticized the platform's EdgeRank algorithm for limiting the site's (and other blogs) reach unless they paid for promotion.

In 2017, No Clean Singing collaborated with Invisible Oranges and Southwest Terrorfest to launch the Northwest Terrorfest. The website continues to sponsor the festival.
