= Seasons Bleedings =

EP by Holy Grail
- Released: December 6, 2011
- Genre: Heavy metal
- Length: 8:40
- Label: Prosthetic Records

Holy Grail EP chronology
Improper Burial (2009)	Seasons Bleedings (2011)

Seasons Bleedings is an EP by Holy Grail released in 2011 under Prosthetic Records.

== Track listing ==
No.	Title	Length
1.	"No Presents for Christmas" (King Diamond cover)	4:04
2.	"Kill the King" (Rainbow cover)	4:36
Total length:		8:40

Digital download bonus tracks
No.	Title	Length
3.	"Exciter" (Judas Priest cover)	4:13
4.	"Fast as a Shark" (Accept cover)	3:45
Total length:		16:38

== Personnel ==
- Blake Mount - bass
- Tyler Meahl - drums
- Eli Santana - guitars
- James Paul Luna - vocals
- Alex Lee - guitars
