= Crisis in Utopia =

Studio album by Holy Grail
- Released: October 22, 2010 (Germany); October 25, 2010 (UK/Europe); October 26, 2010 (USA); October 27, 2010 (Japan)
- Genre: Heavy metal
- Label: Prosthetic Records
- Producer: Danny Lohner

Holy Grail chronology
Crisis in Utopia (2010)	Ride the Void (2013)

Professional ratings
Review scores
Source	Rating
Lords of Metal	82/100

Crisis in Utopia is the debut album by American heavy metal band Holy Grail.

== Track listing ==
No.	Title	Length
1.	"My Last Attack"	5:16
2.	"Fight to Kill"	3:25
3.	"Call of Valhalla"	3:47
4.	"Crisis in Utopia"	3:58
5.	"Immortal Man"	3:48
6.	"Nocturne in D Minor" (instrumental)	2:07
7.	"The Blackest Night"	3:57
8.	"Chase the Wind"	5:19
9.	"Hollow Ground"	5:23
10.	"Requiem"	5:10
11.	"Cherish Disdain"	4:58
Total length:		47:08

== Personnel ==
Holy Grail

- James Paul Luna – vocals
- Tyler Meahl – drums
- Blake Mount – bass
- Eli Santana – guitars, vocals
- James J. LaRue – guitars
- Dirk Rüdiger Monroy Duarte - guitars

Additional personnel

- Andrei Bouzikov – cover art
- Scott Hull – mastering
- Mark Lewis – mixing
- Matt Appleton – engineering
- Danny Lohner – producer, engineering
- Carson Slovak – layout
- Anna Murphy – additional instrumentation
- Meri Tadic – additional instrumentation
