= The Modern Art of Setting Ablaze =

Studio album by Mantar
- Released: 24 August 2018
- Genre: Sludge metal, black metal
- Length: 47:44
- Label: Nuclear Blast

Mantar chronology
Ode to the Flame (2016)	The Modern Art of Setting Ablaze (2018)	Grungetown Hooligans II (2020)

The Modern Art of Setting Ablaze is the third studio album by German sludge metal band Mantar, which was released by Nuclear Blast on 24 August 2018. The album also was released in Russia, Japan and South Africa.

== Reception ==
Professional ratings
Review scores
Source	Rating
Distorted Sound	8/10
Hard Beat	6/10
Metal.de	8/10
Metal Hammer	4/5 stars
Metal Wani	8.5/10

In a review for Metal Wani, Prateek Kulkarni called it "Mantar's best album yet" and added that The Modern Art of Setting Ablaze blows Ode [to the Flame] out of the water for me. It is heavier, filthier and the vocals sound wretched – [that's] how I like my sludge". Kulkarni also stated that "there isn't a bad track on this album, but if I have to mention some personal standout tracks, [it will be] "Age of the Absurd", "Eternal Return", "Obey the Obscene" and "The Formation of Night".

== Track listing ==
The Modern Art of Setting Ablaze track listing
No.	Title	Length
1.	"The Knowing"	1:50
2.	"Age of the Absurd"	3:39
3.	"Seek + Forget"	4:05
4.	"Taurus"	4:28
5.	"Midgard Serpent (Seasons Of Failure)"	4:20
6.	"Dynasty of Nails"	4:42
7.	"Eternal Return"	3:47
8.	"Obey the Obscene"	4:17
9.	"Anti Eternia"	3:49
10.	"The Formation of Light"	4:13
11.	"Teeth of the Sea"	3:15
12.	"The Funeral"	5:15
Total length:		47:44

== Personnel ==
- Hanno Klänhardt – vocals, guitar
- Erinç Sakarya – drums

== Charts ==
Chart performance for The Modern Art of Setting Ablaze
Chart (2018)	Peak position
Austrian Albums (Ö3 Austria)	53
German Albums (Offizielle Top 100)	7
Swiss Albums (Schweizer Hitparade)	54
