= Feed the Beast =

Feed the Beast may refer to:

- Feed the Beast (Bonded by Blood album), 2008
- Feed the Beast (Kim Petras album), 2023
  - Feed the Beast World Tour, the accompanying tour
- Feed the Beast (TV series), 2016
- "Feed the beast", a political strategy
