= Year of Desolation =

American metal band

- Origin: Indianapolis, Indiana, U.S.
- Genres: Melodic death metal, thrash metal, groove metal
- Years active: 2001–present
- Label: Prosthetic Records
- Members: Chad Zimmerman; Matt Behner; Josh Kappel; John Hehman; Mike Vandegriff

Year of Desolation is an American metal band formed in Indiana in 2001. They are influenced by classic rock and heavy metal, and have year and years of touring under their belts. They have four releases, with a critically acclaimed release on Prosthetic Records with a video for the song "Suffer Thy Nemesis" on YouTube.

== Members ==
=== Current members ===
- Chad Zimmerman – vocals (2001)
- Matt Behner – drums (2006–present)
- Josh Kappel – guitar (2004–present)
- John M Hehman II – guitar (2001)
- Mike Vandegriff – bass (2004–present)

=== Former members ===
- Jason Connors – drums (2001)
- David Bailey – drums (2001–2002)
- Joey Roberts – drums (2002–2003)
- Chad Beber – bass (2002–2004)
- Mike Collier – guitar (2002–2004)
- Ryan Green – guitar (2004)
- Jason Carr – drums (2003–2005)
- Jake Omen – drums (2005–2006)
- Matt McCutcheon – drums (2006)
- Matthew Behner – drums (2006, 2007–present)
- Mike Vandegriff – bass (2004–2007–present)
- Steve Spitzbart – drums (2007)
- Brandon Lytle – bass (2007–2008)

== Discography ==
- The Dirty 30 vs. The Donkey Punch (EP, 2002)
- Your Blood, My Vendetta (album, 2004)
- Winter (demo, 2005)
- Year of Desolation (CD, Prosthetic, 2007)
