= Undeath (band) =

American metal band

- Origin: Rochester, New York
- Genres: Death metal
- Years active: 2018–present
- Labels: Prosthetic
- Members: Alexander Sason; Matt Browning; Kyle Beam; Tommy Wall; Jared Welch
- Website: undeathmetal.com

Undeath is an American death metal band from Rochester, New York founded in 2018.

After forming in 2018, the band released two demos the following year. Signing with Prosthetic Records, they released their debut studio album, Lesions of a Different Kind, in October 2020. Their second album, It's Time...to Rise from the Grave, came out in 2022, followed by More Insane in 2024.

The band has been described as playing old-school death metal, drawing comparisons to Cannibal Corpse, while their stage presence and general attitude has been called "party death metal".

== Members ==
- Alexander Sason – vocals
- Matt Browning – drums
- Kyle Beam – guitar
- Tommy Wall – bass (2020–present)
- Jared Welch – guitar (2020–present)

== Discography ==
=== Albums ===
- Lesions of a Different Kind (2020)
- It's Time...to Rise from the Grave (2022)
- More Insane (2024)

=== Demos ===
- Demo '19 (2019)
- Sentient Autolysis (2019)
