= Mantar (band) =

German sludge metal band

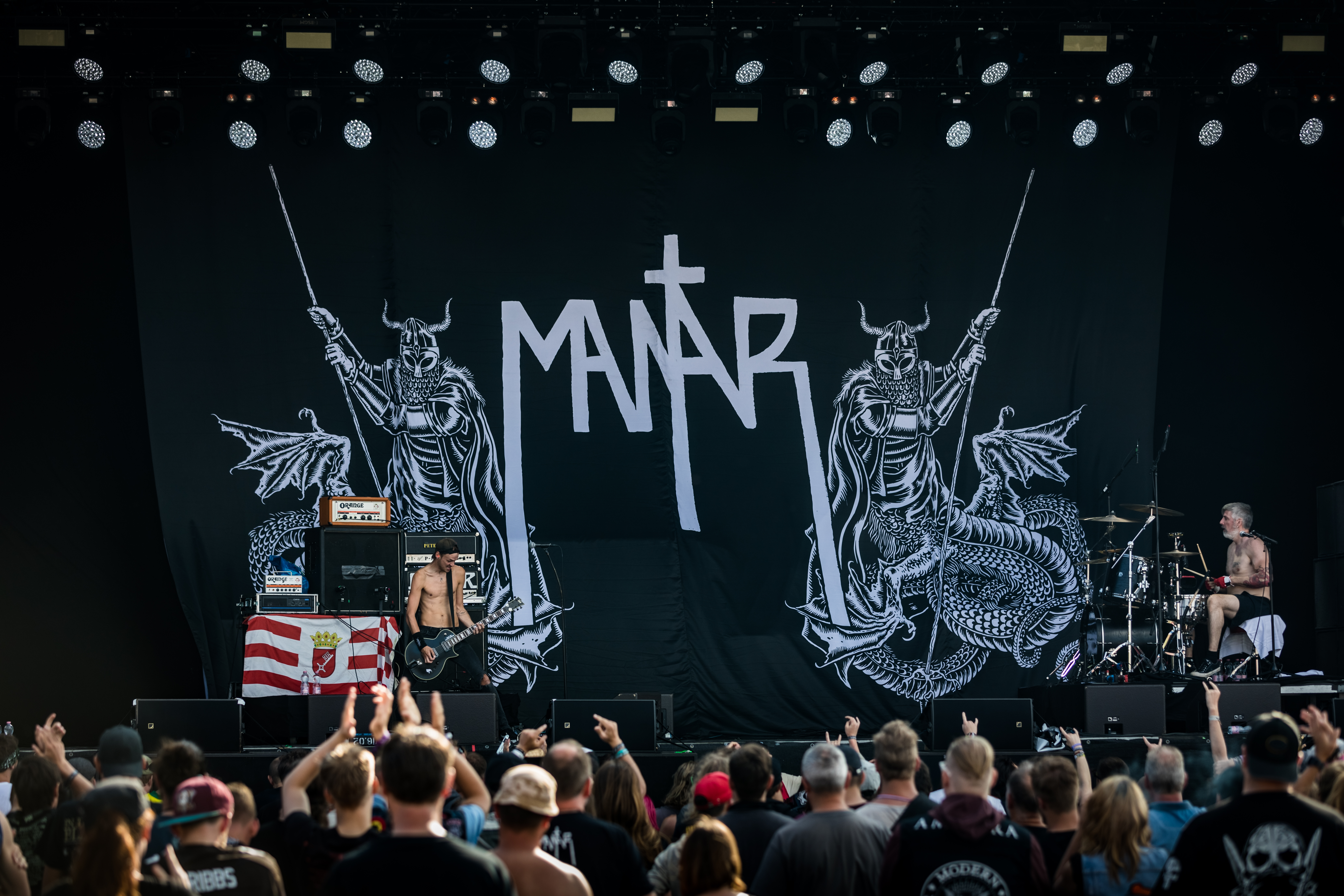
- Hanno (left) and Erinç (right) performing at Rock am Ring 2018

Background information
- Origin: Bremen, Germany
- Genres: Sludge metal, extreme metal
- Years active: 2012–present
- Labels: Nuclear Blast, Svart, Metal Blade
- Members: Erinç Sakarya; Hanno Klänhardt
- Website: mantarband.com

Mantar (Turkish for "mushroom") is a German sludge metal duo. It was formed in 2012 by drummer Erinç Sakarya and guitarist Hanno Klänhardt. The two are originally from Bremen but later moved to Hamburg. Hanno Klänhardt lives in Gainesville, Florida since 2015. The band plays entirely without a bassist.

== History ==
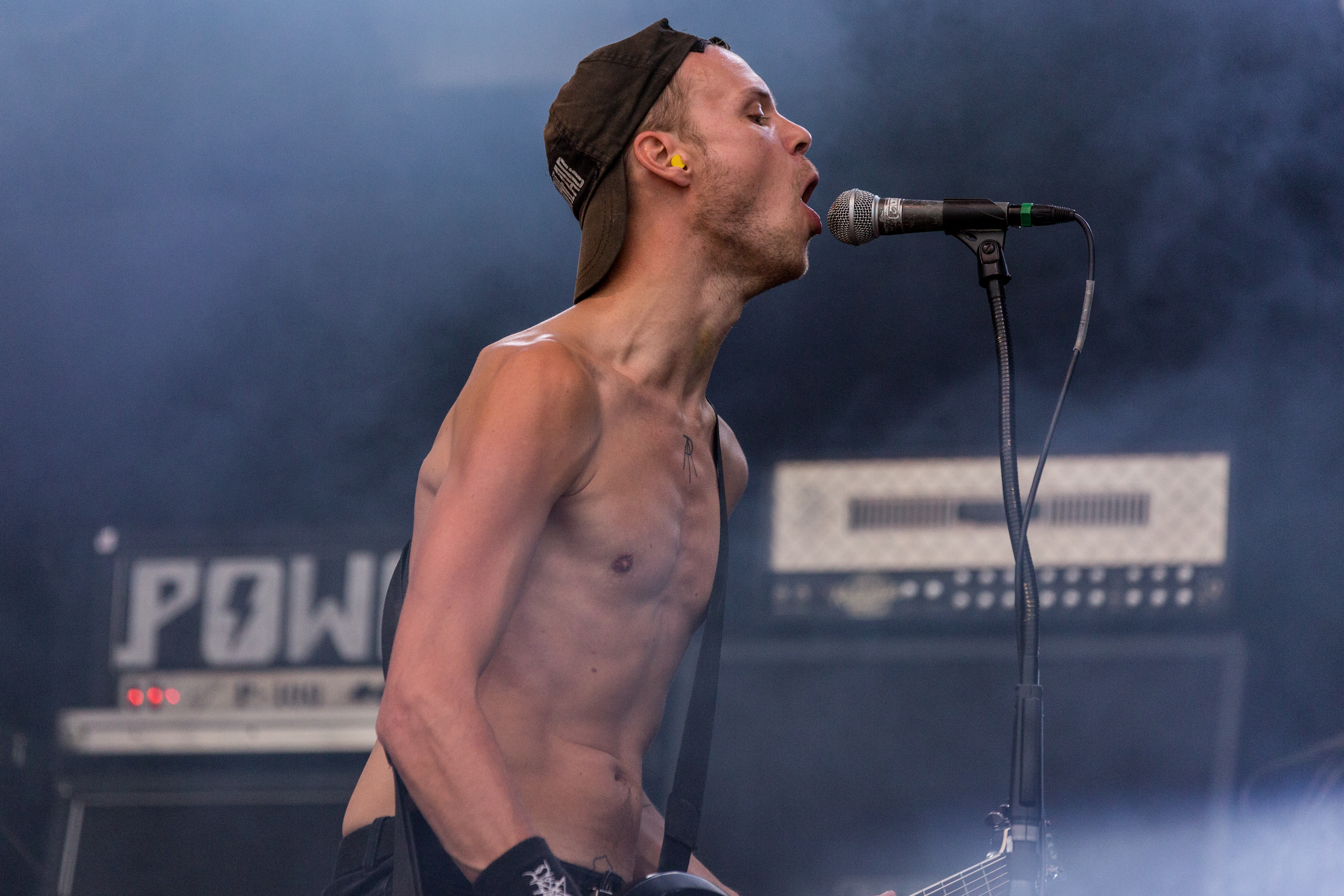
Hanno Klänhardt at Party.San 2017

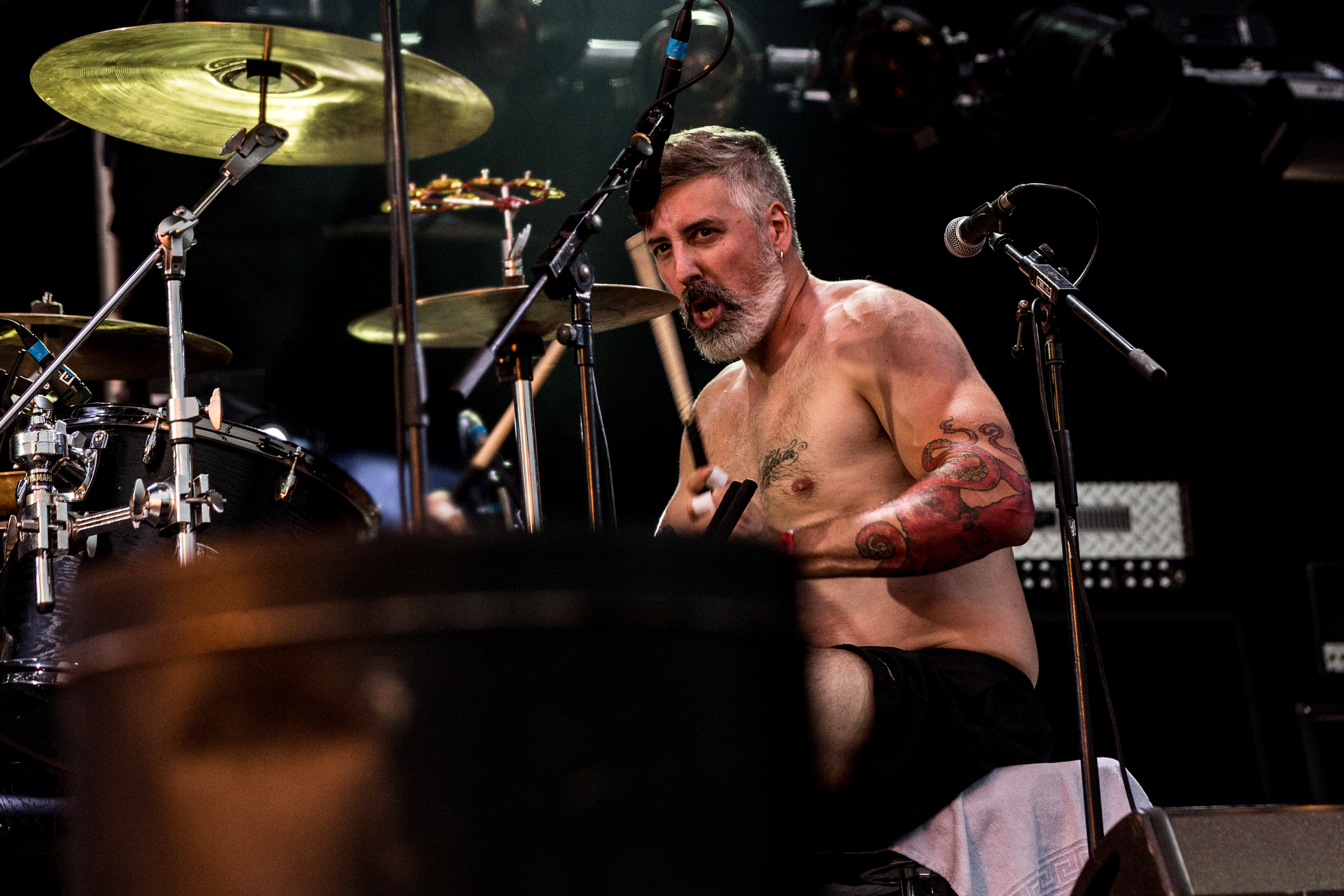
Erinç Sakarya at Party.San 2017

Mantar was formed in 2012 by two old friends, drummer Erinç Sakarya and guitarist Hanno Klänhard. The band's music was influenced by the early works of bands such as Melvins, Darkthrone and Motörhead. The duo released their debut studio album, Death by Burning, in 2014 on the Svart Records. In 2016 band signed to the Nuclear Blast. In same year they released second album, called Ode to the Flame. In the summer of 2018, the third album, The Modern Art of Setting Ablaze, was released. In 2020 band released cover album Grungetown Hooligans II via their own label Mantar Records. In April 2022, the band announced their next album, Pain Is Forever and This Is the End, released on 15 July.

== Members ==
- Erinç Sakarya – drums, vocals (2012–present)
- Hanno Klänhardt – vocals, guitars (2012–present)

== Discography ==
Studio albums

- Death by Burning (2014)
- Ode to the Flame (2016)
- The Modern Art of Setting Ablaze (2018)
- Grungetown Hooligans II (2020)
- Pain Is Forever and This Is the End (2022)
- Post Apocalyptic Depression (2025)

Singles and EPs

- Spit (2013)
- The Berserker's Path (2014)
- Cross The Cross (2016)
- The Spell (2017)
- Conquest of Rats (2018)

Live albums

- St. Pauli Sessions (2016)
