= Infernaeon =

- Origin: Ft. Lauderdale, Florida, United States
- Genres: Heavy Metal
- Labels: Prosthetic Records, Black & Blue Records

Infernaeon is an extreme metal band from Ft. Lauderdale, Florida. They have released two full-length albums on Prosthetic Records entitled A Symphony of Suffering (2007) and Genesis to Nemesis (2010) and a full-length album on Black & Blue Records entitled The Cancer Within (2013). Formed in the spring of 2004 by vocalist Chris Defaut, bassist Kevin Gibbons (Strychnine), guitarist Brian Magley, and drummer Salvatore Guasto, the group recorded and released their first demo entitled "Oracle of Armageddon" in Fall of 2004. They went on to gain a following in the South Florida area where they played with such bands as Response Negative, Sac, and Divine Empire.

In late 2005 Chris Defaut left the band to join Divine Empire, and was replaced by vocalist Brian Werner (Vital Remains/Monstrosity), and guitarist Sam Molina (Monstrosity).

In 2007, Infernaeon released their debut album A Symphony of Suffering via Prosthetic Records and features Nick Augusto on drums (Trivium/Maruta) and guest vocals by Ben Falgoust (Goatwhore/Soilent Green). The album was recorded at keyboardist Zach Brown’s Homeland studios in Boca Raton, FL, and Mastered at Mana Studios in St. Petersburg, FL by Erik Rutan (Morbid Angel/Hate Eternal). The band toured this album steadily over the next several years with other acts including Anal Cunt, Vital Remains, Skinless, Anal Blast, Pyrexia, Sons of Azrael, and Crematorium.

In 2010, they released their second album Genesis to Nemesis also via Prosthetic Records introducing new guitarists Steven Harger and Taylor Nordberg, new drummer Jeramie Kling (The Absence), and keyboardist Dave Stein (Northwinds/Strychnine).

The release features guest vocals by Dave Brockie (Oderus Urungus) of Gwar on the band's cover of Metallica's "Creeping Death", and guest vocals by Erik Rutan (Morbid Angel/Hate Eternal) on "Legacy of Cain".

The album was recorded/engineered by Brian Elliot at Mana Studios in Florida, and drums were recorded/produced by James Murphy (Death/Testament). The band went on to tour with Gwar, The Casualties, and Mobile Deathcamp in the Fall of 2010 on Gwar’s three-month-long Bloody Pit of Horror Tour. In 2013, the band started work on their follow-up to Genesis to Nemesis, entitled The Cancer Within, and newcomer Eric Rhodes replaced Werner on vocals. The Cancer Within was released on Black & Blue Records on August 27, 2013 and was produced, recorded, and mastered by James Murphy (Death/Testament) and mixed by Peter Tägtgren (Hypocrisy/Pain).
