= Nero di Marte =

Italian experimental metal band

- Genres: Post metal Experimental metal
- Years active: 2012—present
- Labels: Prosthetic Records
- Website: http://www.nerodimarte.com/

Nero di Marte is an experimental metal band based in Bologna, Italy. Formerly known under the name "Murder Therapy" since 2007, the band released their debut album Symmetry of Delirium in 2009 and the EP Molochian in 2011. After some line-up changes, recording sessions for a new album took place throughout the summer of 2011, which was then mixed and mastered at Studio73 in Ravenna. During the course of 2012, the band changed their name to Nero di Marte, the name the album was originally given and subsequently signed to Prosthetic Records, who released the album worldwide in mid-March 2013. After their first North American tour with Gorguts and Origin, they returned once again to Studio73 from May to June 2014 to record their second album, Derivae, which was released in late October 2014 on Prosthetic. Nero di Marte has toured Europe and North America with major acts such as Gorguts, Godflesh, Cynic, Decapitated, Origin, Psycroptic, The Ocean, Intronaut, Ulcerate and Red Fang among others.

== Band members ==
=== Current members ===
- Sean Worrell – vocals, guitar
- Alessio Cattaneo – guitar
- Giorgio Figà Talamanca – bass
- Giulio Galati – drums, percussion

=== Former members ===
- Marco Bolognini – drums, percussion
- Francesco D'Adamo – guitar
- Andrea Burgio – bass

== Discography ==
=== Albums ===
- 2009 – Symmetry of Delirium (as "Murder Therapy")
- 2013 – Nero di Marte
- 2014 – Derivae
- 2020 – Immoto

=== EPs ===
- 2008 – The Therapy (as "Murder Therapy")
- 2011 – Molochian (as "Murder Therapy")
- 2014 – Split MMXV 7" split with Void Of Sleep

=== Singles and Music Videos ===
- 2013 – Time Dissolves
- 2016 – Those Who Leave
