= List of Nuclear Blast artists =

The following artists (musicians or bands) have had releases with the German independent record label Nuclear Blast.

== 0-9 ==
- 96 Bitter Beings

== A ==
- Aborted
- Accept (ex)
- After Forever (ex)
- Agathodaimon (ex)
- Agnostic Front (ex)
- Alcest
- Alesana (after Artery Recordings and Revival Recordings)
- All Shall Perish (ex)
- Am I Blood (ex)
- Amaranthe
- Amorphis (ex)
- Anthem
- Anthrax (EU only)
- Arsis (US only)
- Ashes of Ares (ex)
- As I Lay Dying (ex)
- Augury (US only)
- Auri
- Avantasia (ex)
- Avatarium (ex)
- Aversions Crown

== B ==
- Bal-Sagoth (ex)
- Battle Beast
- Battlecross (ex)
- Beast in Black
- Behemoth
- Belphegor (ex)
- Benediction
- Beyond the Black
- Biohazard
- Blackbriar
- Black Star Riders (ex)
- Blackguard (Europe only) (ex)
- Bleed from Within
- Bleed the Sky (ex)
- Bleeding Through (Europe only) (ex)
- Blind Guardian
- Blues Pills (ex)
- Brujeria
- Before the Dawn
- Brand of Sacrifice
- Broken Teeth
- Bullet (ex)
- Bury Tomorrow (ex)

== C ==
- Cabal
- Callejon (ex)
- Candlemass (ex)
- Carcass
- Carnifex (ex)
- Cathedral (ex)
- Cellar Darling
- Children of Bodom (ex)
- Chimaira (Cleveland Ohio) (ex)
- Cipher System
- Chrome Division
- Clawfinger(ex)
- Coldseed (ex)
- Communic
- Comeback Kid (ex)
- Conjurer (band)
- Control Denied (ex)
- Corrosion of Conformity
- Cradle of Filth (ex)
- Crematory (ex)
- Crucified Barbara (US only)
- Cryptopsy (As Gomorrah Burns only)

== D ==
- The Damned Things
- Danzig (ex)
- Darkane (ex)
- Darkseed (ex)
- Dark Sermon (ex)
- David Shankle Group (ex)
- Death (ex)
- Death Angel
- Deathstars
- Decapitated
- Decrepit Birth
- Defecation
- Demonaz
- Demonoid (ex)
- Destruction (ex)
- Despised Icon
- Devilment
- Devil You Know
- Dew-Scented (ex)
- Diablo Boulevard
- Die Apokalyptischen Reiter
- Dimmu Borgir
- Disbelief (ex)
- Discharge
- Disembodied Tyrant
- Disharmonic Orchestra (ex)
- Dismal Euphony (ex)
- Dismember (ex)
- Dissection (ex)
- Divinity (ex)
- Doro
- Down
- Dreadful Shadows (USA Only)
- Dynazty

== E ==
- Earthless
- Echoes of Eternity (ex)
- Edguy
- Ektomorf (ex)
- Eluveitie
- Enforcer
- Enslaved
- Emperor (ex)
- Epica
- Equilibrium
- Ex Deo (ex)
- Exodus (ex)
- Exhorder
- Eyes Set To Kill

== F ==
- Face Down (ex)
- Fallujah
- Farmer Boys (ex)
- Fear Factory
- Filter (ex)
- Fireball Ministry (ex)
- Fit for an Autopsy
- Fleshgod Apocalypse
- Flotsam and Jetsam (ex)
- Forbidden (ex)
- For Today (ex)
- Fuming Mouth

== G ==
- Gardenian (ex)
- Gatecreeper
- Generation Kill
- Ghost Bath
- Godgory (ex)
- Golem (ex)
- Gorefest (ex)
- Gorgoroth (ex)
- Gotthard
- Grand Magus
- Grave Digger (ex)
- Graveworm
- Graveyard
- Green Lung

== H ==
- Hackneyed (ex)
- HammerFall
- The Halo Effect
- Hangman's Chair
- Hatebreed (ex)
- Hardcore Superstar
- Heathen (ex)
- Hell
- The Hellacopters
- Helloween (ex)
- Helltrain (ex)
- Higher Power
- HOKKA
- Hollow (ex)
- Holy Grail
- Horde (ex)
- Hypocrisy

== I ==
- I
- Illuminate (ex)
- Immortal (ex)
- In Flames
- Immolation
- Indica

== K ==
- Kadavar
- Kataklysm
- Keep of Kalessin (ex)
- Khemmis
- Killer Be Killed
- Knorkator (ex)
- Korpiklaani
- The Kovenant (ex)
- Kreator

== L ==
- Lacrimosa (United States only)
- Lamb of God (ex)
- Light the Torch
- Like Moths to Flames (ex)
- Lingua Mortis Orchestra
- Liquido (ex)
- Lock Up
- Lordi (ex)
- Lovebites
- Luca Turilli's Rhapsody

== M ==
- M.O.D. (ex)
- Machine Head
- Madball
- Majestica
- Malevolent Creation (ex)
- Mandragora Scream (ex)
- Manowar (ex)
- Mantic Ritual (ex)
- Marilyn Manson
- Master (ex)
- MaYan
- Melechesh
- Mendeed (ex)
- Meshuggah (ex)
- Metal Allegiance
- Ministry (ex)
- Misery Index (ex)
- Møl
- Mnemic (ex)
- Mortification (ex)
- Municipal Waste
- My Dying Bride
- Mystic Prophecy (ex)

== N ==
- Nails
- Narnia (ex)
- Nightwish
- Nile (ex)
- Nokturnal Mortum (ex)
- NorthTale
- Northward
- Nothing Left

== O ==
- Obscura
- Omnium Gatherum (ex)
- One Man Army and the Undead Quartet (ex)
- Opeth (ex)
- Opprobrium (ex)
- Orchid
- Origin
- Orphanage (ex)
- Overkill

== P ==
- Pain
- Paradise Lost
- Pegazus (ex)
- Phil Campbell and the Bastard Sons
- Possessed
- Primal Fear (ex)
- Prime STH (ex)
- Pro-Pain (ex)
- Psycroptic
- Pungent Stench (ex)
- Pyogenesis (ex)

== R ==
- Rage
- Raise Hell (ex)
- Raunchy (ex)
- ReVamp (ex)
- Rhapsody of Fire (ex)
- Ride the Sky (ex)
- Rings of Saturn (ex)
- Ringworm
- Rob Zombie
- Rise of the Northstar (ex)

== S ==
- S.O.D. (ex)
- Sabaton (ex)
- Samael (ex)
- Satyricon (ex)
- Savatage (United States only)
- Scar Symmetry
- Scorpion Child
- Scour
- Secret Sphere (ex)
- Sepultura
- Sinergy (ex)
- Sinister (ex)
- Sinner (ex)
- Sirenia (ex)
- Skyclad (ex)
- Slaughter (ex)
- Slayer (ex)
- Soilwork
- Sonata Arctica (ex)
- Sonic Syndicate (ex)
- Soulfly
- Speckmann Project (ex)
- Stahlhammer (ex)
- Steel Prophet (ex)
- Stormwitch (ex)
- Stratovarius (ex)
- Subway To Sally (ex)
- Success Will Write Apocalypse Across the Sky (ex)
- Such A Surge (ex)
- Suffocation
- Suicide Silence (ex)
- Suicidal Tendencies (ex)
- Susperia (ex)
- Svalbard
- Swashbuckle (ex)
- Sylosis
- Symphony X

== T ==
- Tankard (ex)
- Tarot
- Tasters (ex)
- Terror 2000 (ex)
- Testament
- Texas in July (Europe only)
- Textures
- Theatre of Tragedy (ex)
- The 69 Eyes (ex)
- The Abyss (ex)
- The Accüsed (ex)
- The Adicts
- The Black League (ex)
- The Crinn (US only)
- The Defiled
- The Duskfall (ex)
- The Exploited
- The Halo Effect
- The Hellacopters
- The Night Flight Orchestra
- The Vintage Caravan
- The Charm The Fury
- Therion (ex)
- Threat Signal (ex)
- Threshold
- Thunderstone (ex)
- Thy Art Is Murder (ex)
- Tiamat (ex)
- Timo Tolkki (ex)
- To/Die/For (ex)
- Tribal Gaze
- Tuomas Holopainen
- Turilli / Lione Rhapsody (ex)
- Twilight Force (ex)

== U ==
- Unleashed (ex)

== V ==
- Vader
- Vein.fm
- Venom Inc.
- Voivod (ex)

== W ==
- Warmen (ex)
- Warrior (ex)
- Watain
- We Came as Romans (Europe only)
- Wednesday 13 (ex)
- While Heaven Wept
- White Skull (ex)
- Winter (ex)
- Wintersun
- Witchcraft
- Witchery (ex)
- Within Temptation (Hydra only)
- Wolf Hoffmann
- World Under Blood
