= Judicator (band) =

American power metal band

- Origin: United States
- Genres: Power metal; heavy metal
- Years active: 2012–present
- Labels: Prosthetic, Masters of Metal, Divebomb, Alone, Independent
- Members: John Yelland; Alicia Cordisco; Chad Anderson; Dayton Anderson; Mike Lofgreen; Francisco Pérez
- Past members: Jordan Elcess; Balmore Lemus; Joseph Palomares; Chris Kelly; Joshua Payne; Lorelai Rena Laffey; Austin Bentley; Michael Sanchez; Ulises Hernandez; Dalton Jolley; John Dolan

Judicator is an American power metal band based in Salt Lake City, Utah, Goodyear, Arizona, and Los Angeles, California. The band was formed in 2012 after singer/songwriter John Yelland met guitarist/songwriter Alicia Cordisco at a Blind Guardian concert two years prior. The band has released seven full-length albums, King of Rome, Sleepy Plessow, At the Expense of Humanity, The Last Emperor, Let There be Nothing, The Majesty of Decay and Concord, and one EP, Coping Mechanism. The band's lyrics center primarily on history, faith, and existentialism.

== History ==
=== Formation and time as a two-person project (2012–2015) ===
Judicator was formed in 2012 after singer/songwriter John Yelland met guitarist/songwriter Alicia Cordisco at a Blind Guardian concert two years prior. They released their debut album King of Rome under Masters of Metal Productions in October 2012. The album follows the rise of Napoléon Bonaparte and his eventual defeat during the War of the Seventh Coalition at Waterloo. The album was met with generally favorable reviews.

On June 4, 2013, their second studio album Sleepy Plessow was released; it details Prussian history and culminates with the life and death of Frederick the Great. The album received mixed reviews. Metal Music Archives gave it 4.5/5 rating, complimenting its use of harsh vocals and more complex song arrangements. Hard Rock Haven gave the album a 5/10 and described it as "hit or miss", while Slug Magazine criticized the album for sounding "like it was only partially finished, hampered by flat production and a rote, repetitive take on typical power metal riffs."

=== At the Expense of Humanity (2015–2017) ===
Emboldened by an increase in popularity following their first two albums, Yelland and Cordisco grew the duo into a full-fledged band.

In 2015, the band released the album At the Expense of Humanity based on Yelland's experience of losing his older brother to cancer when he was a teenager. The album explores the struggles of the Yelland family during the tragic experience, as well as the questions it raised surrounding faith, death, and family. After Masters of Metal Productions closed, Judicator signed with Divebomb Records to release the album. The band also successfully launched and funded the production of the album through an IndieGoGo campaign.

The album was met with universally positive reviews. Dissonant Geek gave the album a 9/10 and praised the album's improved production quality, saying, "You would think this album came from a big producer like Nuclear Blast USA or Roadrunner, it's that well made." Amps and Green Screens gave the album a 9.9/10 and praised the lyrics as "deep and thought provoking."

=== The Last Emperor (2018–2019) ===
In 2018, Judicator released their fourth studio album The Last Emperor. The album follows the Peasant's Crusade and The Crusades. Hansi Kürsch, the vocalist of Blind Guardian, appeared on the track “Spiritual Treason”.

Angry Metal Guy gave the album a 3.5/5, stating that The Last Emperor's quality proves "that At the Expense of Humanity was no mere fluke" and that it "is surely one of the best power metal albums" of the year.

=== Signing to Prosthetic Records and Let There be Nothing (2020–2022) ===
In April 2020, the band announced they had signed with Prosthetic Records and would release their fifth album Let There Be Nothing on July 24, 2020.

Let There be Nothing is a concept album about Flavius Belisarius. According to a press release on Prosthetic Records' website: "The album follows Belisarius, a humble and renowned Byzantine general, on his campaigns to reconquer former Roman territories. While Belisarius is a master on the battlefield, his greatest struggle will be within. Political forces continually undermine his authority, and his wife’s infidelity will put both his faith and morals to the test. Let There be Nothing is a morality play framed within a sweeping, historical epic."

The album garnered mostly favorable reviews, with Blabbermouth.net giving it an 8.5/10 and applauded the "immaculately constructed" songs. Angry Metal Guy gave the album a 3.5/5, stating that with this album, "Judicator have cemented themselves as one of the best modern power metal acts running."

In September 2020, co-founder, guitarist and songwriter Alicia Cordisco announced her departure from the band citing personal reasons, and that she would be continuing her former band Project: Roenwolfe. The band announced that they would continue on with a new lineup, adding John Dolan on bass, Jordan Elcess moving back to drums, and Balmore Lemus on guitar.

=== The Majesty of Decay (2022–present) ===
In August 2021, MetalStorm.net reported that Judicator had begun to work on a new album. In September 2022, the band premiered a new music video and single via Metal Injection, and announced their sixth studio album The Majesty of Decay, which was released on November 25, 2022.

The Majesty of Decay has been considered a turning point for the band, as it marks the first album without Alicia Cordisco, who up until her departure from the band had been the principal songwriter. Singer John Yelland wrote all of the music and lyrics for The Majesty of Decay.

The album received critical success, with many reviewers praising the album's more progressive direction. Devilution gave the album a 5/5, calling it "a stroke of genius," and "something new, but still something excellent." Pop Matters claimed The Majesty of Decay was the best power metal album of 2022 and Angry Metal Guy said it was "simply one of the best power metal albums released in the last few years".

== Line up ==
Current members

- John Yelland – vocals (2012–present)
- Alicia Cordisco – rhythm & lead guitars, backing vocals (2012–2020, 2026–present)
- Chad Anderson - guitars (2023–present)
- Dayton Anderson - guitars (2023–present)
- Mike Lofgreen - drums (2024–present)
- Francisco Pérez - keyboards (2025–present)

Former members

- Jordan Elcess – drums (2014–2023), bass (2014)
- Balmore Lemus - lead guitar (2020–2023)
- Joseph Palomares – bass (2013–2016)
- Chris Kelly – drums (2013–2014)
- Joshua Payne – guitars (2013–2014)
- Lorelai Rena Laffey – keyboards (2014–2016)
- Austin Bentley – guitars, keyboards (2016)
- Michael Sanchez – bass, guitars (2016–2020)
- Ulises Hernandez - drums (2020)
- Dalton Jolley - drums (2023–2024)
- John Dolan - bass (2020–2026)

== Discography ==
- King of Rome (2012)
- Sleepy Plessow (2013)
- At the Expense of Humanity (2015)
- The Last Emperor (2018)
- Let There Be Nothing (2020)
- The Majesty of Decay (2022)
- Concord (2025)
