= Inter Arma =

American metal band

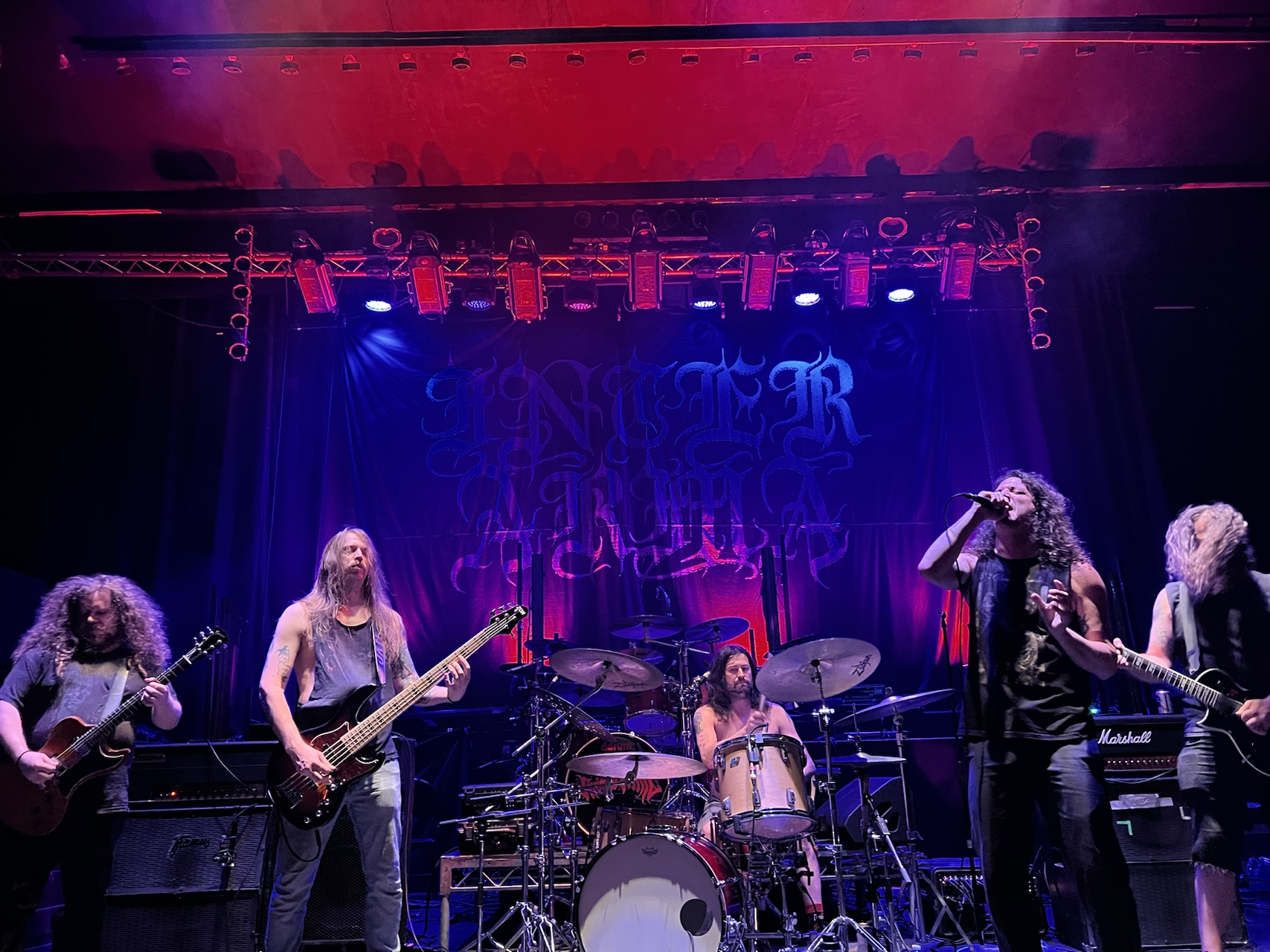
- Inter Arma performing in 2025.

Background information
- Origin: Richmond, Virginia
- Genres: Extreme metal
- Years active: 2006-present
- Members: Mike Paparo; Steven Russell; Trey Dalton; Joel Moore; T.J. Childers

Inter Arma is an American extreme metal band from Richmond, Virginia.

== Band members ==
Current

- Mike Paparo – vocals (2007–present)
- Steven Russell – guitars (2007–present)
- Trey Dalton – guitars (2009–present)
- Joel Moore - bass (2022–present)
- T.J. Childers – drums (2007–present)

Former

- Kristopher Cox - vocals (2006-2007)
- Joe Mueller - guitar (2007-2009)
- Andrew LaCour – bass (2018–2020)
- Tommy Brewer - bass (2007–2012)
- Joe Kerkes - bass (2012–2018)
- Brently Hilliard - bass (2021–2022)

Touring members

- Jon Liedtke - keyboards (2007–present)
- Alex Tomlin - drums (2023–present)
- Mikey Allred – keyboards, organ, theremin, trombone (2017)
- Toby Swope - Guitar (2026-present)

== Discography ==
=== Studio albums ===
- Sundown (2010, Forcefield)
- Sky Burial (2013, Relapse)
- Paradise Gallows (2016, Relapse)
- Sulphur English (2019, Relapse)
- Garbers Days Revisited [Covers album] (2020, Relapse)
- New Heaven (2024, Relapse)

=== EPs and splits ===
- Inter Arma / Battlemaster (2009, Mirror Universe)
- Destroyer (2012, Toxic Assets)
- The Cavern (2014, Relapse)

=== Demos ===
- Live demo (2007, self released)
- '08 demo (2008, self released)
