= Bonded by Blood (band) =

American thrash metal band

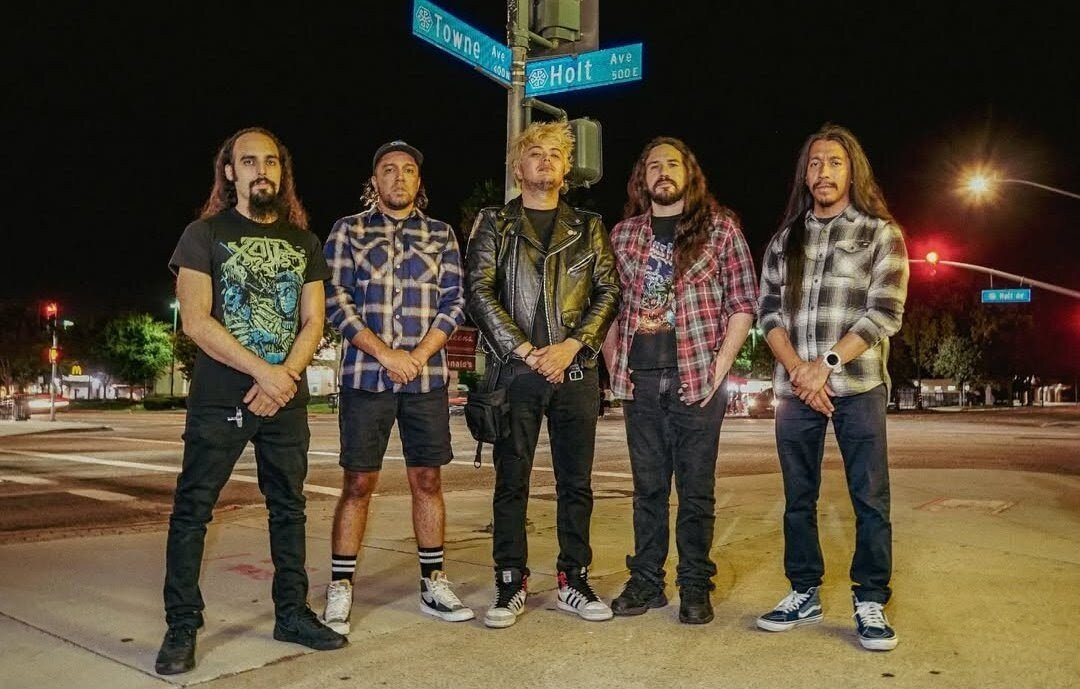
- Bonded by Blood, c. 2024

Background information
- Origin: Pomona, California, U.S.
- Genre: Thrash metal
- Years active: 2005–present
- Label: Earache
- Members: Jose Barrales; Juan Juarez; Jadran Gonzalez; Jerry Garcia; Stephen Ramirez
- Past members: Jessie Sanchez; Mauro Gonzalez; Ruben Dominguez; Carlos Regalado; Alex Lee

Bonded by Blood is an American thrash metal band, named after Exodus' debut album Bonded by Blood. Like its labelmates Evile, Gama Bomb, and Municipal Waste, Bonded by Blood is part of the thrash metal revival movement. The band was founded in mid-2005 by vocalist Jose Barrales, who with the help of friends completed the band's original lineup with guitarist Alex Lee, guitarist Juan Juarez, bassist Ruben Dominguez, and drummer Carlos Regalado.

In 2006, Bonded by Blood won a battle of bands that featured over 250 musical groups. With the contest prize, the band recorded the demo Four Pints of Blood and a year later they self-financed the recording of the EP Extinguish the Weak, releasing the songs through their MySpace page. The band attracted the attention of Earache Records, which signed them in late 2007. The band released its first full-length Feed the Beast in 2008. While on tour Dominguez left the band and was replaced by bassist Jerry Garcia, who had his debut on Bonded by Blood's second full length Exiled to Earth, released in 2010. Their third and last full-length studio album to date, The Aftermath, was released two years later.

== History ==
=== Formation and win at battle of bands (2005–2006) ===
Hailing from Pomona, California, the members of Bonded by Blood met through mutual friends. The idea of creating a band was conceived by lead vocalist Jose Barrales, a singer with hardcore punk and crossover thrash backgrounds, influenced by groups like Bad Brains, Cryptic Slaughter, D.R.I. and Black Flag. He always had an appreciation for heavy metal music, but it was not until a friend recommended him to listen to Exodus that Barrales got into the thrash metal subgenre. Exodus' debut album Bonded by Blood had a profound impact on Barrales, and it was inspiring to the point he idealized the creation of a thrash metal band, as he had noticed that there were few or even no groups in this genre in the music scene.

In mid-2005 Barrales began looking for musicians for the band, asking friends of his to see if they could recommend anyone, which is how he heard of guitarist Alex Lee. When Barrales saw Lee play, he dropped the thought of trying to play rhythm guitar himself because he had a fear of not being able to keep up. There were a few years that Lee was playing guitar, but he was already playing along to music by Steve Vai, John Petrucci, Rusty Cooley, Paul Gilbert and Michael Angelo Batio. Lee decided to join Barrales, and together, they went on searching until they found themselves the drummer Carlos Regalado, who was known locally by playing covers of Megadeth and Metallica. With Regalado in the band, he helped to find bassist Ruben Dominguez. The band was impressed with the skills of Dominguez, who soon joined the band completing its line-up. The band then decided to name themselves after Exodus' Bonded by Blood, an album they had in common in their collection, even though their music tastes differed.

A year later, the band decided to enter into a battle of bands contest, which included over 250 musical ensembles. The music competition's prize was $3,000 and two days in a recording studio. The band then decided it was time for another guitarist, to fill in some of that empty sounds during guitar solo's and to add to the band for a more full sound live. Through friends, Barrales contacted guitarist Juan Juarez and asked him to join Bonded by Blood. Juarez accepted and he then met the rest of the members and they all liked him as well. After winning round after round, Bonded by Blood finally won first place. The band then recorded the demo Four Pints of Blood at Love Juice Labs in the Californian city of Riverside. With this demo, Bonded by Blood gave people something to listen to and it gave the band an audience.

=== Extinguish the Weak and Feed the Beast (2007–2008) ===
At that time, the band was courted by some independent record labels, but they refused any offer because they felt they were not ready to sign a recording contract. After playing plenty more shows and making a few more songs, they recorded the Extinguish the Weak EP in August 2007. Just as many of its contemporaries, Bonded by Blood self-released the EP. The band was receiving assistance from edtrax (Edward S Duke) of Thrash Unlimited (Radio) who debuted the band to the world and heavily promoted their demo. A BBB track was played every hour 24 hrs a day for about 8 months. One of Earache Records talent scouts was listening to Thrash Unlimited Radio. Earache Records, signed the band in September 2007. In late October, Bonded by Blood was one of the support acts for Exodus on a three-date Mexican tour.

Bonded by Blood commenced the recording of its first full-length, Feed the Beast, in January 2008 at J Street studios in Sacramento, California with producer Michael Rosen. At first, the recording sessions were going well, but when the band finish off Rosen began to manipulate the songs in ways that musicians were not enjoying it. The band then decided to re-record the album in the same studio where they recorded the Extinguish the Weak EP. Earache released Feed the Beast on May 9 in the United Kingdom and June 24 in the United States. Bonded by Blood supported the album with the Thrashing Like a Maniac tour. They toured the United States between June and July along with Fueled by Fire and Merciless Death, and in Europe between September and October with Gama Bomb headlining.

=== Exiled to Earth and The Aftermath (2009–2012) ===
The band continued the tour returning to the UK in May 2009 for a short string of dates with support from labelmates Cauldron. In November 2009 they announced the departure of Dominguez, who was replaced by bassist Jerry Garcia from San Bernardino thrash metal band Taking Over. Meanwhile, the band was finishing the writing process of their second album, and in January 2010 they entered the Highland Recorders studio in Phoenix, Arizona to begin recording with producer Ralph Patlan. Bonded by Blood's second full-length, Exiled to Earth, was released through Earache on August 10 in North America and August 16 in Europe.

Just a month after the release of Exiled to Earth, Bonded by Blood have parted ways with Barrales, who decided to leave the band due to personal and financial reasons. The band's founding member was replaced by Mauro Gonzales from local band Mutants of War. The new lineup have been rehearsing for the upcoming tour dates. In early 2011 Jerry left the band for personal and financial reasons and Alex Lee left the band to join Holy Grail. On October 8, 2011, they welcomed Jessie Sanchez (ex Holy Grail) into the group as their new bassist. With this lineup, Bonded by Blood recorded their third album The Aftermath, which was released in July 2012. After a few tour stints to promote The Aftermath the band has not been active and has not released any music in 9 years.

=== Reunion (since 2021) ===
The band announced on their official Facebook and Instagram page that after years of hiatus the band has been revived. The reunion includes 3 of the founding members (Alex Lee, Jose Barrales and Juan Juarez) and Exiled to Earth era bassist (Jerry Garcia).

== Musical style and lyrical themes ==
"Despite the name, Bonded by Blood are far from a mere Exodus tribute act, taking the riffs, ideas and neck-snapping tempos of their heroes and bolstering them with two decades of momentum, making every pummeling beat, dizzying solo and juvenile lyric sound completely relevant."

— Adam Rees, Metal Hammer

According to Barrales, beyond the name, Bonded by Blood borrowed from Exodus for inspiration everything. "From the guitars being razor-sharp to the drums, the speed. We wanted to do something that resemble that. Something that is gonna be fast and in-your-face. And what better band than Exodus to be inspired by?" Exodus' lead guitarist Gary Holt says that is a compliment that the band has named themselves after Bonded by Blood. "Could I have imagined that all these years later a band was going to name themselves after our first album? Probably not. It is not like that convention—naming bands after songs—is something new, but I think it is great."

Bonded by Blood along with its labelmates Evile, Gama Bomb, and Municipal Waste are considered part of the thrash metal revival movement. The members of Bonded by Blood have been inspired by the music and fashion of 1980s thrash metal.

Aside from 1980s thrash metal, the band has expressed their love of skateboarding, comic books, cartoons (most notably the Teenage Mutant Ninja Turtles), and writing detailed articles about themselves. At the time of recordings of the Extinguish the Weak EP—while the band were rehearsing—Barrales was listening to the Teenage Mutant Ninja Turtles theme song online and suggested the band to create a cover version. Initially, Bonded by Blood played the song in live performances, but after receiving positive feedback from the audience the band decided to record it. "Theme from Teenage Mutant Ninja Turtles" was originally included on the Extinguish the Weak EP and later on Feed the Beast.

== Members ==
Current members

- Juan Juarez – guitars (2005–present)
- Jadran "Conan" Gonzalez– guitars (2023 - present)
- Jose Barrales– vocals (2005–2010, 2021–present)
- Jerry Garcia – bass (2009–2011, 2021–present)
- Stephen Ramirez – drums (2021–present)

Former members

- Jessie Sanchez – bass
- Mauro Gonzalez – vocals
- Ruben Dominguez – bass
- Carlos Regalado – drums
- Alex Lee - guitars

Timeline

== Discography ==
=== Full-lengths ===
- Feed the Beast (Earache, 2008)
- Exiled to Earth (Earache, 2010)
- The Aftermath (Earache, 2012)

=== Other releases ===
- Four Pints of Blood (Demo, 2006)
- Extinguish the Weak (self-released EP, 2007)

=== Appears on ===
- Thrashing Like a Maniac (Compilation, 2007)
