= Feed the Beast (Bonded by Blood album) =

Studio album by Bonded by Blood
- Released: June 9, 2008
- Genre: Thrash metal
- Length: 41:48
- Label: Earache
- Producer: Michael Rosen

Bonded by Blood chronology
Feed the Beast (2008)	Exiled to Earth (2010)

Feed the Beast is the debut studio album by American thrash metal band Bonded by Blood, released in 2008 via Earache Records. In 2017, it was ranked number 50 on Loudwire's list "Top 50 Thrash Albums of All Time".

== Track listing ==
All songs are credited to Bonded by Blood.

No.	Title	Length
1.	"Immortal Life"	2:55
2.	"Feed the Beast"	4:52
3.	"Psychotic Pulse"	4:28
4.	"Necropsy"	3:18
5.	"Mind Pollution"	3:26
6.	"Another Disease"	3:23
7.	"The Evil Within"	4:48
8.	"Tormenting Voices"	2:50
9.	"Civil Servant"	3:48
10.	"Self-Immolation"	3:26
11.	"Vengeance"	3:25
12.	"Teenage Mutant Ninja Turtles"	1:13

== Personnel ==
- Jose Barrales – vocals
- Alex Lee – guitar
- Juan Juarez – guitar
- Ruben Dominguez – bass
- Carlos Regalado – drums
