= Thantifaxath =

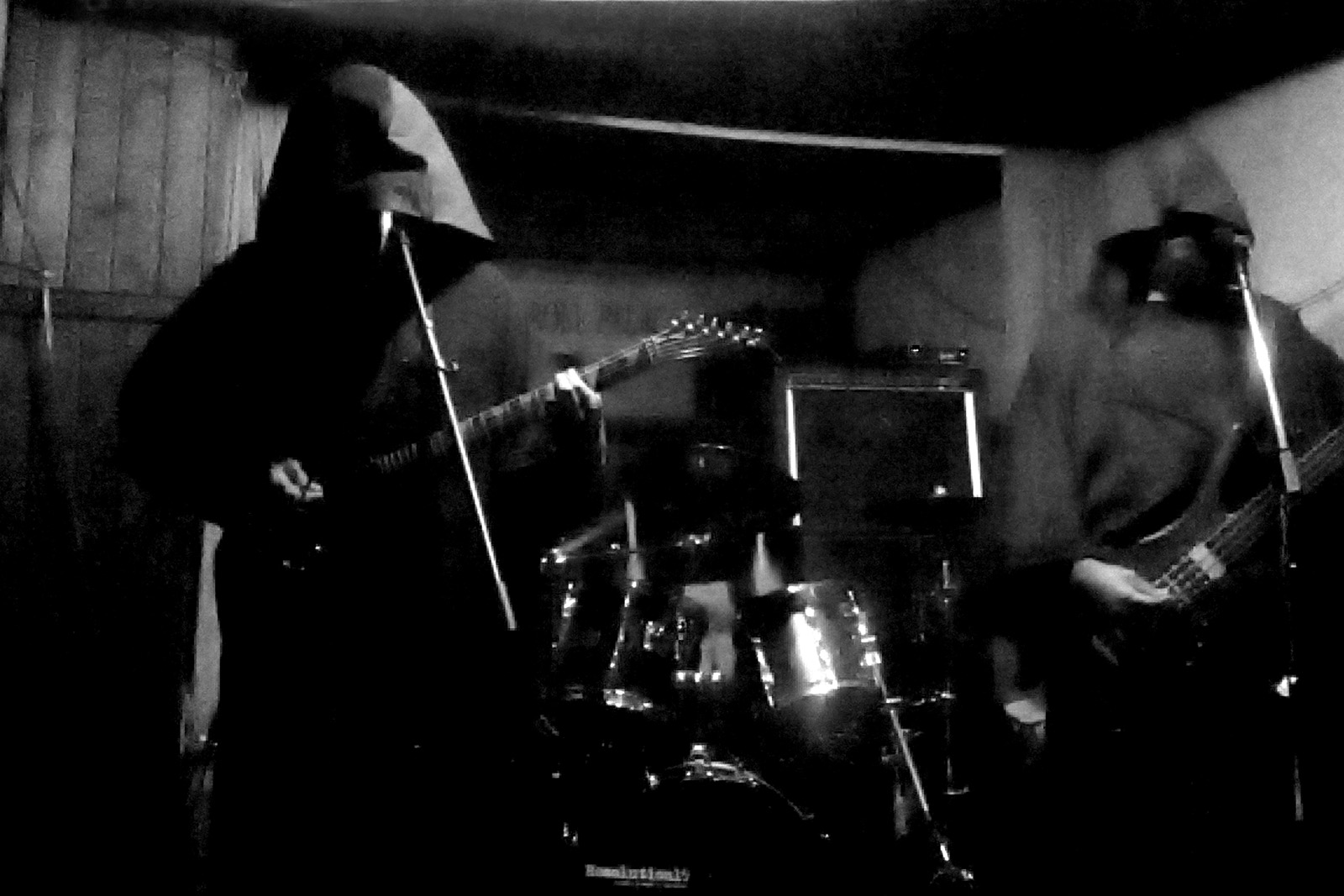
- Thantifaxath in 2015

Background information
- Origin: Toronto, Ontario, Canada in 2010
- Genres: Black metal, experimental metal
- Label: Dark Descent
- Website: darkdescentrecords.com

Thantifaxath is a Canadian avant-garde black metal band based in Toronto, Ontario. The band, which is signed to Dark Descent Records, consists of three anonymous members.

The band, founded in 2010, released their self-titled EP in 2011. The band's debut album, Sacred White Noise, was released on April 15, 2014 via Dark Descent Records. The band premiered the album's opening track, "The Bright White Nothing at the End of the Tunnel" via SoundCloud in February 2014, which gained attention from art and music websites such as Vice, BrooklynVegan and Sputnikmusic. The track "Where I End & the Hemlock Begins" was also released on SoundCloud.

In 2014, the band started touring with New York-based black metal band Castevet in North America. Despite touring, the band maintains its anonymity.

The band's music has been described as "a batch of incendiary, discordant and blistering black metal." On the band's debut album, Doug Moore of Invisible Oranges wrote: "Sacred White Noise is both artsy and rooted in black metal, it's pristinely performed, beautifully recorded, and far more expansive than any typical black metal album." He also described it as "a thematically and harmonically frightening" record, while stating: "Progressive rock and outré noise run flanking maneuvers around the edges of a truly vicious frontal assault that borders on death metal in gravity."

== Discography ==
Studio albums

- Sacred White Noise (2014, Dark Descent Records)
- Hive Mind Narcosis (2023, Dark Descent Records)

EPs

- Thantifaxath (2011, Dark Descent Records)
- Void Masquerading as Matter (2017, Dark Descent Records)
