= Dawn Ray'd =

British black metal band

- Origin: Liverpool, England
- Genres: Black metal
- Years active: 2015–2023
- Labels: Prosthetic Records
- Members: Simon Barr; Matthew Broadley; Fabian Devlin
- Website: dawnrayd.bandcamp.com

Dawn Ray'd were a British black metal band.

== History ==
In 2008, singer and violinist Simon Barr and guitarist Fabian Devlin formed a band named We Came Out Like Tigers in Liverpool. In the following years, drummer Matthew Broadley would join them, leading to the creation of a black metal band, named Dawn Ray'd. The group was named after a line in Voltairine de Cleyre's 1898 poem Santa Agueda about the assassination of Antonio Cánovas del Castillo. The group was openly anarchist and anti-fascist.

The band released their first EP, A Thorn, a Blight, in 2015, followed by their first album, The Unlawful Assembly, in 2017. In 2017, the group additionally signed with record label Prosthetic Records.

In 2019, the group released their second album, Behold Sedition Plainsong. Kerrang! reviewed the album at 4/5 stars, stating that the band "simultaneously exemplify and challenge black metal rebellion here."

In September 2023, the band announced they had broken up.

== Discography ==
Studio albums

- The Unlawful Assembly (2017)
- Behold Sedition Plainsong (2019)
- To Know the Light (2023)

EPs

- A Thorn, a Blight (2015)
- Wild Fire (2021)
