= Vile Creature =

Canadian metal band

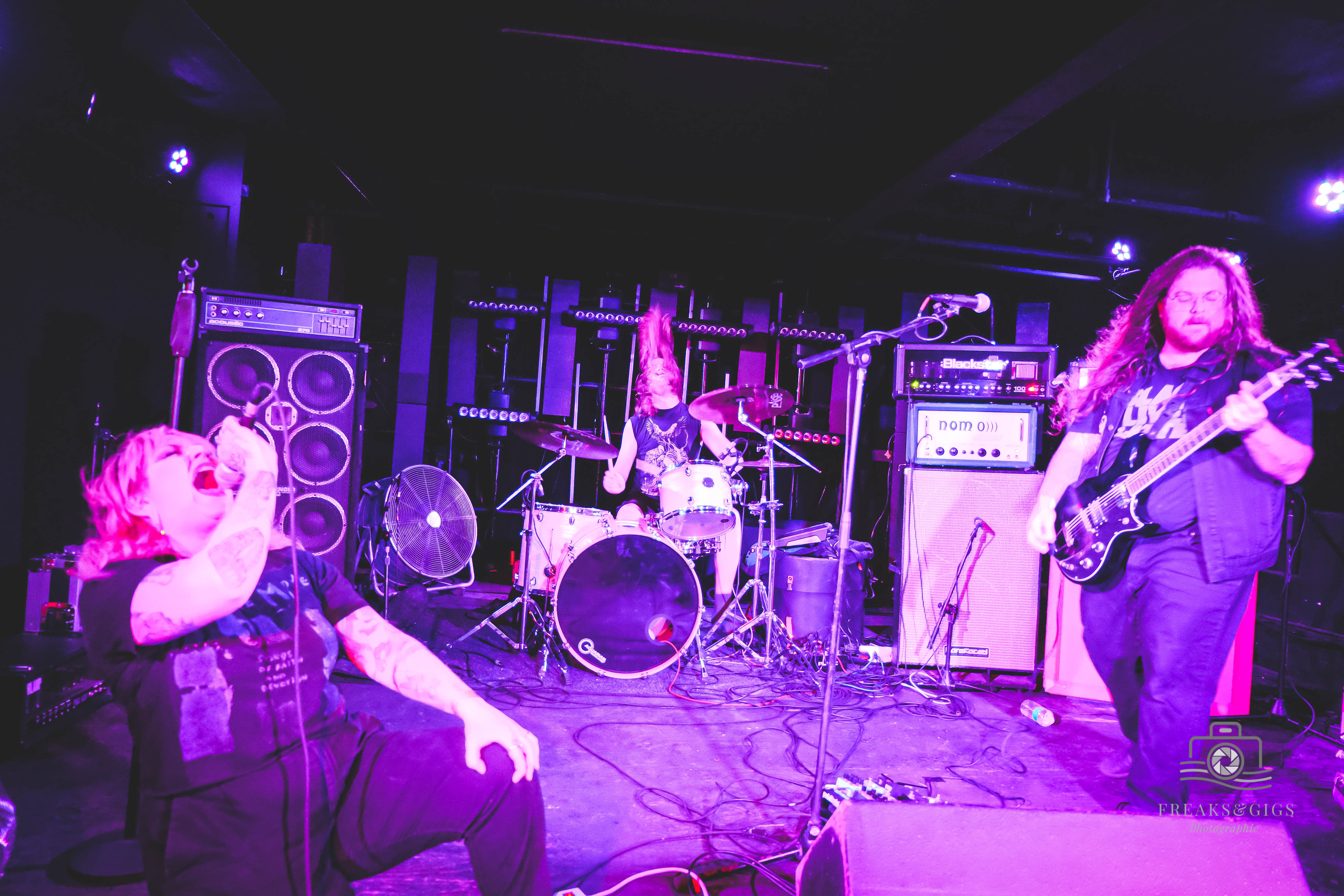
- Vile Creature performing at Electrowerkz, 2022

Background information
- Origin: Hamilton, Ontario, Canada
- Genres: sludge metal; drone metal; doom metal
- Years active: 2014–present
- Labels: Perpetual Flame Ministries (2022-present); Prosthetic Records (2014-2022)
- Members: Vic; KW Campol
- Website: vilecreature.net

Vile Creature is a Canadian sludge/doom metal band from Hamilton, Ontario. They are most noted for their 2020 album Glory, Glory! Apathy Took Helm!, which received a Juno Award nomination for Heavy Metal Album of the Year at the Juno Awards of 2021.

The band consists of guitarist and vocalist KW Campol and drummer and vocalist Vic, a couple who both identify as queer and make music from a progressive activist perspective. In addition to their musical career, they operate the Coven Plant Based Marketplace, a vegan food store in Hamilton, and KW is part owner of a tattoo shop, Sleepy Bones.

The duo released their first album, A Steady Descent Into the Soil, in 2015, and followed up with the EP A Pessimistic Doomsayer in 2017 and the album Cast of Static and Smoke in 2018. In 2019, after signing to Prosthetic Records, they released Preservation Rituals (2015-2018), a compilation album which combined all three of the earlier releases.

In 2022, Campol co-founded the Perpetual Flame Ministries record label alongside American musician Kristin Hayter.

In July 2024, Vile Creature announced that they taking an indefinite hiatus from performing live.

== Personnel ==
Members

- Vic – drums, vocals
- KW Campol – guitar, vocals, drums

== Discography ==
Studio albums

- A Steady Descent into the Soil (2015)
- Cast of Static and Smoke (2018)
- Glory, Glory! Apathy Took Helm! (2020)
- A Hymn of Loss and Hope (collaboration with Bismuth) (2022)

Singles

- Harbinger Of Nothing (Metal Swim 2 Compilation) (2019)
- In Tenebris Lux (with Bismuth) (2020)
- Paperdoll (Kittie cover, Send the Pain Below compilation) (2021)

EPs

- A Pessimistic Doomsayer (2016)

Compilations

- Preservation Rituals (2015-2018) (2019)
