= Graves at Sea =

American metal band

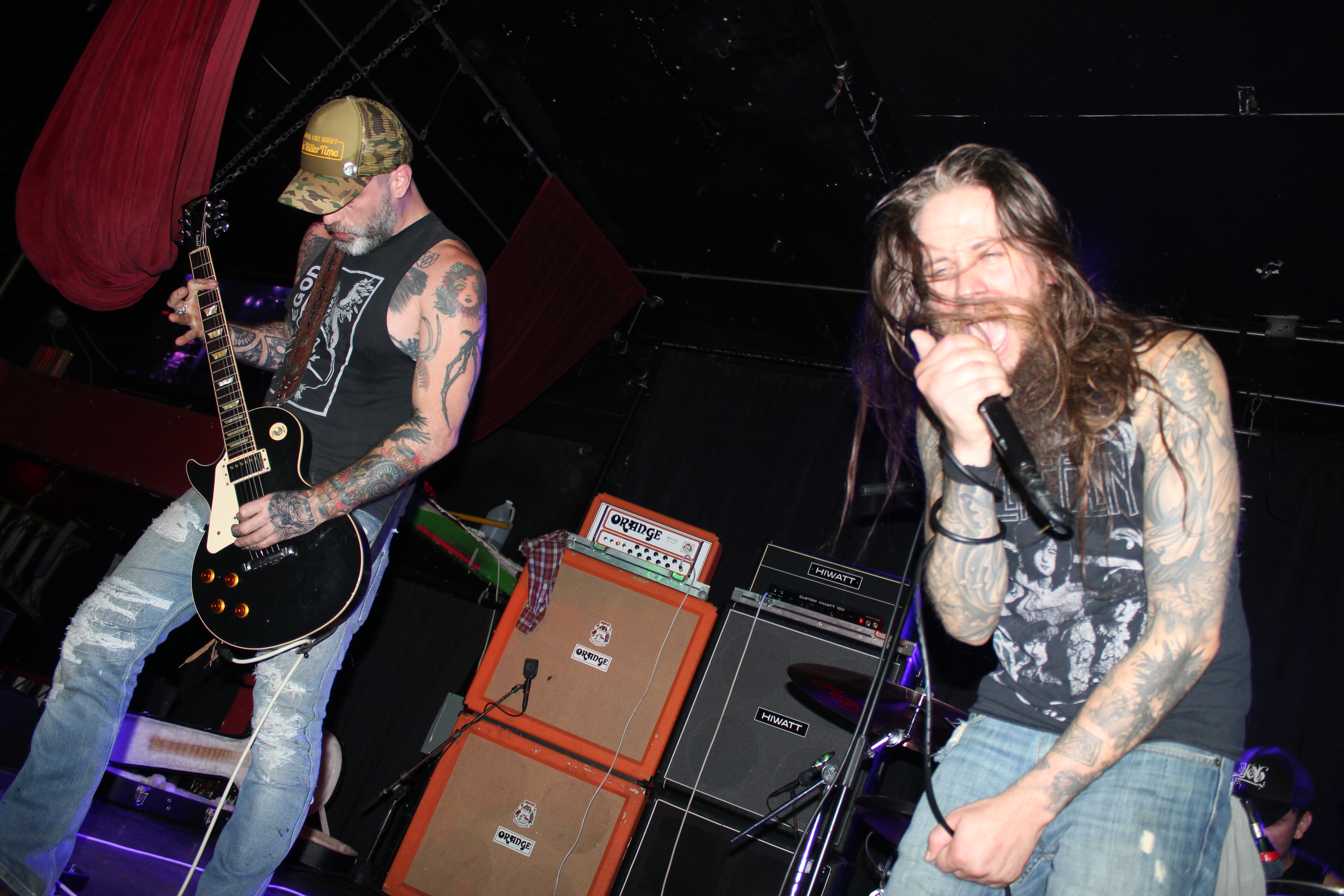
- Graves at Sea in 2015

Background information
- Origin: Phoenix, Arizona; Oakland, California; Portland, Oregon
- Genres: Sludge metal; doom metal
- Years active: 2002–2008; 2012–present
- Labels: Relapse, Southern Lord, Eolian Empire, Seventh Rule Records
- Members: Nick Phit; Nathan Misterek; Jeff McGarrity; Bryan Sours
- Past members: Tommy Cavizel; Roger Williams; Steve Klatz; Miguel Veliz; Chiyo Nukaga; Lola Henderson; Greg Wilkinson; Chuck Watkins
- Website: gravesatsea.bandcamp.com

Graves at Sea are an American sludge/doom metal band that was originally formed in 2002 by Nick Phit, Nathan Misterek, Roger Williams and Steve Klatz.

== Biography ==
The band kickstarted their career by self-releasing a demo titled Documents of Grief in 2003. Following this, they vigorously toured and gained the attention of by Greg Anderson of Southern Lord Records and of the drone metal band Sunn O))), whose label released the band's single, Cirrhosis b/w Atavist Arise in 2004. In 2005, Graves at Sea released a split with the death-doom band Asunder, which was followed by a line up change in 2007 when Misterek moved to Oakland and Phit moved to Portland, Oregon. In 2008, the band played two final shows with members Chiyo Nukaga of the band Noothgrush on drums and Miguel Veliz of Sourvein and The Roller on bass and broke up following this.

Four years later in 2012 however, Graves at Sea reunited with Nukaga on drums and Greg Wilkinson of the band Brainoil on bass, but both would subsequently leave the band due to time constraints they faced. The band would go on to tour in Europe in 2013, followed by performances on the West Coast of the United States. In 2014, the band released a split album with the band Sourvein on Seventh Rule Records, followed by their second European tour, also with Sourvein, which included an appearance at Roadburn Festival. The band followed this by releasing an EP on Eolian Records titled This Place Is Poison followed by live performances at Maryland Deathfest and other US festivals. The band eventually released their debut studio album titled The Curse That Is in 2016 on Relapse Records.

== Members ==
=== Current members ===
- Nick Phit – guitars (2002–2008, 2012–present)
- Nathan Misterek – vocals (2002–2008, 2012–present)
- Jeff McGarrity – bass guitar (2013–present)
- Bryan Sours – drums (2013–present)

=== Former members ===
- Tommy Cavizel – drums
- Roger Williams – bass guitar (2002–2006)
- Steve Klatz – drums (2002–2006)
- Miguel Valiz – bass guitar (2007–2008)
- Chiyo Nukaga – drums (2007–2008, 2012–2013)
- Greg Wilkinson – bass guitar (2012–2013)

== Discography ==
=== Studio albums ===
- The Curse That Is (2016)

=== Other releases ===
- Documents of Grief (demo, 2003)
- Cirrhosis b/w Atavist Arise (single, 2004)
- Graves at Sea/Asunder (split, 2005)
- This Place Is Poison (EP, 2014)
- Graves at Sea/Sourvein (split, 2014)
