= Mares of Thrace (band) =

Canadian band

Mares of Thrace is a Canadian doom metal band from Calgary, Alberta. They are most noted for their album The Pilgrimage, which was a longlisted nominee for the 2012 Polaris Music Prize.

== History ==
Originally consisting of vocalist Therese Lanz and drummer Stef MacKichan, the band released their debut album The Moulting in 2010, and followed up with The Pilgrimage in 2012.

After The Pilgrimage, however, the band went on hiatus for a number of years as Lanz was under increasing time pressures in her primary job as a video game developer; they reunited in 2017 to begin recording new material, but MacKichan was forced to drop out due to a family matter, and the band went back on hiatus until Casey Rogers, a bandmate of Lanz's in a different project prior to Mares of Thrace, offered to fill in on drums. Lanz and Rogers completed recording on the band's third album, The Exile, which was released in 2022 on Sonic Unyon. They supported the album with a tour of Canada and the United States in 2023.
