= CVLT Nation =

Online magazine

- Company type: Private
- Website type: Music, arts, and fashion magazine; online store
- Available in: English
- Founded: March 2011; 15 years ago
- Headquarters: Vancouver, Canada; Los Angeles, United States
- Area served: Worldwide
- Founders: Sean Reveron; Meghan MacRae
- Industry: Music, apparels, accessories
- Website: www.cvltnation.com
- Launched: 2011
- Current status: Active

CVLT Nation is an international online magazine established by Sean Reveron and Meghan MacRae in 2011 in Los Angeles, California. Founded primarily as an independent clothing brand inspired by crust punk and extreme metal, its articles and music projects have gained considerable recognition. CVLT Nation is now based in Vancouver, Canada.

The publication focuses on music, art and fashion, especially relating to underground musicians and visual artists of extreme metal, crust punk and punk rock's heavier subgenres. It also features articles on real-life horror stories, such as cults and murders. CVLT Nation's clothing art is either made by them or commissioned from metal and punk tattoo artists, musicians, and illustrators around the world, wherein black metal artists play a substantial part. According to Reveron, the company was intended to be international from the beginning, and most of its collaborators are from outside the United States.

== History ==
CVLT Nation was founded in 2011 by Sean Reveron and his partner Meghan MacRae. Previously, both were part of the streetwear company RockersNYC from New York and God's Prey from Los Angeles. The couple decided to launch the company after attending an Amebix show in 2010 in Los Angeles, where they "felt at home" because their fashion and music tastes were based on metal and crust punk, as well as the community of these subcultures, said Reveron, which is at variance with the competitiveness of the fashion industry. Reveron stated that they were "trying to build a bridge between the music we love and the clothing we make". They started a blog as a complement for the clothing line, which soon became a proper web magazine; according to Arkansas Times, CVLT Nation had become an "indispensable metal/punk/hardcore online magazine" by 2012.

In August 2015, CVLT Nation established the new marketplace site CVLT Nation Bizarre to sell their clothing alongside small-batch goods from other underground companies and record labels.

== Music projects ==
Since its beginning, CVLT Nation has released series of free albums. The "Sonic Cathedrals" series are mixtapes curated by artists such as Nails, Pallbearer and The Body, who choose songs from bands that influenced them. The "Doom Nation" series are doom metal mixtapes.

In January 2014, the publication began releasing the "CVLT Nation Sessions" series, which are cover compilation albums of classic recordings by underground artists. Albums covered include Black Sabbath's Master of Reality, Dead Kennedys' Fresh Fruit for Rotting Vegetables, The Cure's Pornography, Black Flag's My War and Sleep's Holy Mountain. The CVLT Nation Sessions have been featured on Episode 67 of the metal and motorcycle podcast Chop N' Roll .

== Recognitions ==
In March 2015, Noisey called CVLT Nation a "crucial resource for underground music". In March 2019, Czech Radio named it one of the four best independent punk websites, praising the quality of the underground artists featured despite the brand's substantial growth. Dave Cantrell of XRAY.FM credits the darkwave articles of CVLT Nation for the foundation of his radio program Songs From Under the Floorboard and the Out From the Shadows music festival which started in 2018.

CVLT Nation's album series have been praised by Kerrang!, Metal Injection and MetalSucks.
