= Nuclear Blast Records =

German independent record label

Nuclear Blast
- Parent company: Believe Digital
- Founded: 1987
- Founder: Markus Staiger
- Status: Active
- Distributors: AMPED Distribution; Alternative Distribution Alliance; BMG Rights Management; Warner Music Group
- Genre: Heavy metal; hard rock; hardcore punk; extreme metal
- Country of origin: Germany
- Location: Donzdorf, Germany
- Official website: nuclearblast.de

Nuclear Blast Records is a German record label with subsidiaries in Germany, the United States and Brazil. It was founded in 1987 by Markus Staiger in Donzdorf. Originally releasing hardcore punk records, the label moved on to releasing albums by thrash metal, melodic death metal, grindcore, industrial metal, power metal and black metal bands, as well as tribute albums. It also distributes and promotes post-hardcore/metalcore labels SharpTone Records. Another post-hardcore/metalcore label, Arising Empire, was in Nuclear Blast's portfolio until its acquisition by Kontor New Media in 2020.

In October 2018, French independent label Believe Digital acquired a majority stake in Nuclear Blast.

== History ==
Logo and typeface of Nuclear Blast used from 1987 to 2022

Nuclear Blast was formed in 1987 after founder Markus Staiger traveled throughout the United States for four weeks and saw a gig of his favorite band BL'AST!. The label's first release was a vinyl compilation called Senseless Death (NB 001) featuring US hardcore bands like Attitude, Sacred Denial, Impulse Manslaughter and others.

Swedish band Meshuggah became the first band in the history of Nuclear Blast Records to crack the Billboard 200, landing at number 165 with their 2002 album, Nothing. Meshuggah also became the first Nuclear Blast band to be reviewed in Rolling Stone magazine.

In 2004, Finnish symphonic metal band Nightwish released Once on Nuclear Blast, which rocketed to the top of the charts in multiple countries, including Finland, Germany, Norway, Greece, Sweden, Austria, and more. It became the first release in the company's history to reach number 1 on the German charts. It was at this time that Nuclear Blast began releasing its compilation series of DVDs with Nuclear Blast: Monsters of Metal Vol. 1.

During the 2000s and 2010s, Nuclear Blast signed many veteran thrash metal bands including Slayer, Exodus, Testament, Anthrax, Kreator, Overkill, Sepultura, Destruction, Tankard, Death Angel, and Heathen.

Slayer released the album Repentless in 2015, which went to number 4 on the Billboard 200, making it the highest charting Nuclear Blast release in the United States.

In 2021, Nuclear Blast founder Markus Staiger launched a new record company called Atomic Fire GmbH.

In June 2022, Nuclear Blast unveiled a new logo. The logo caused some controversy when the canned water company Liquid Death jokingly noted its similarities with their logo (which also features a melting skull), inadvertedly leading to its designer, Justin Moll, receiving hate mail. Liquid Death quickly apologized for the joke, saying that it was not targeted at Moll but at Nuclear Blast, whose personnel had reportedly raised concerns over the new logo's similarities with Liquid Death's before it was implemented.

On 23 August 2022, the video game Saints Row was released, which features an in-game radio station that includes Nuclear Blast artists.

== Blood Blast Distribution ==
Blood Blast Distribution is a subsidiary of Nuclear Blast that solely focuses on the distribution of extreme music. The company was founded in 2020 by Bryce Lucien, Jerome Riera, Denis Ladegaillerie and Myriam Silberstein.

== See also ==
- List of Nuclear Blast artists
