= Prosthetic Records =

American heavy metal record label

- Parent company: MNRK Music Group
- Founded: 1998
- Founder: Edward "E.J." Johantgen, Dan Fitzgerald
- Distributor: The Orchard
- Genre: Extreme metal, heavy metal
- Country of origin: United States
- Location: Los Angeles, California
- Official website: prostheticrecords.com

Prosthetic Records is an American record label specializing in heavy metal recordings, founded in Los Angeles, California, in 1998 by E.J. Johantgen and Dan Fitzgerald. Prosthetic Records released the first two albums by Lamb of God and Animals as Leaders, and was the North American home to Gojira.

In June 2025, the label was acquired by MNRK Music Group.

== Notable artists ==
=== Current ===
- AC×DC
- The Atlas Moth
- Body Void
- Blind Equation
- Dawn Ray'd
- Four Stroke Baron
- Gama Bomb
- .gif from god
- Judicator
- Junius
- Marty Friedman
- Monotheist
- Neckbeard Deathcamp
- Psycroptic
- Sunrot
- Thus Spoke Zarathustra
- Undeath
- Venom Prison
- Vile Creature
- Wraith

=== Former ===
- 1349
- The Acacia Strain
- All That Remains
- Antagonist
- Animals as Leaders
- Beneath the Massacre
- Byzantine
- Cannae
- Century
- Cognizance
- Dew-Scented
- Dragged into Sunlight
- Exmortus
- Gojira
- Grief of War
- Himsa
- Holy Grail
- Hour of Penance
- Infernaeon
- Kylesa
- Landmine Marathon
- Lamb of God
- Last Chance to Reason
- Light This City
- Nero di Marte
- Septicflesh
- Scale the Summit
- Spirit Adrift
- Skeletonwitch
- Testament
- The Esoteric
- The Funeral Pyre
- Through the Eyes of the Dead
- Trap Them
- Unholy
- Withered
- Wolf
- Wolves Like Us
- Yakuza
- Year of Desolation
- Zodiac

== See also ==
- List of record labels
