= Shame (Uniform album) =

Studio album by Uniform
- Released: September 11, 2020
- Genre: Noise rock; industrial punk; industrial metal
- Length: 34:20
- Label: Sacred Bones
- Producer: Ben Greenberg

Uniform chronology
The Long Walk (2018)	Shame (2020)	American Standard (2024)

Singles from Shame
- 1. "Delco" Released: June 24, 2020; 2. "Dispatches From the Gutter" Released: July 2020

Shame is the fourth studio album by American industrial rock band Uniform. It was released on September 11, 2020 by Sacred Bones Records. Produced by the band's guitarist, Ben Greenberg, the record features Mike Sharp on drums. It was mixed by Randall Dunn.

The lead single from the album, "Delco", was released on June 24, 2020. The second single from the album, "Dispatches From the Gutter", was released in July 2020 with an accompanying music video. A music video for "Life in Remission" was also released concurrently with the album.

== Background and recording ==
The band's third studio album, 2018's The Long Walk, was recorded with drummer Greg Fox. Greg Fox departed the project following the band's European tour in accompaniment with the album, due to his commitments to other bands. The band has enlisted drummer Mike Sharp for its North American tour with Deafheaven and Drab Majesty. In November 2019, vocalist Michael Berdan and guitarist Ben Greenberg went to Austin, Texas for a brief time to meet up with Sharp and brainstormed on the upcoming record, subsequently demoing material. The album was recorded in New York in early February 2020. Randall Dunn handled the mixing; the sessions were completed before the unfolding of the COVID-19 pandemic in the United States. In addition to guitars, Greenberg also played bass guitar on the record; a large portion of the electronic elements and samples were provided by Berdan. Some of the album's material dates back to the band's initial touring sessions with Sharp.

The cover art of the album was created by Heather Gabel of the band Hide.

== Music and lyrics ==
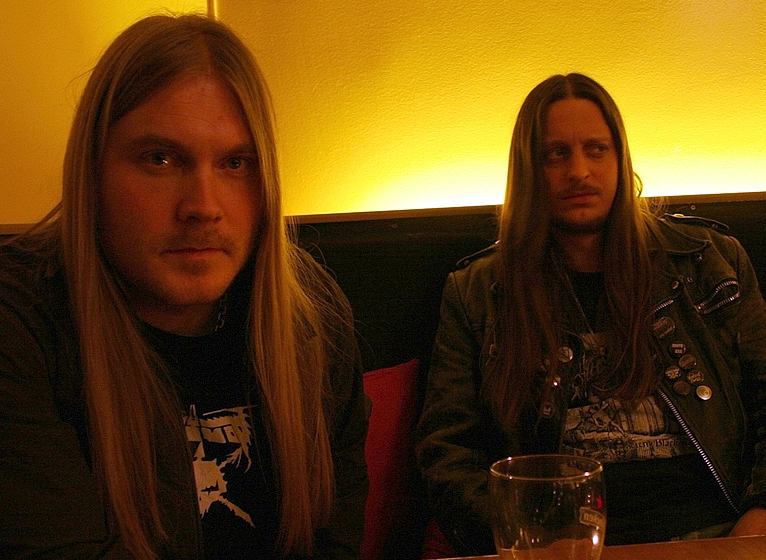
The track "Life in Remission" was inspired by the work of Darkthrone (pictured in 2005).

Shame has been described as industrial noise rock, industrial punk and industrial metal; AllMusic's Paul Simpson thought that the record's sound "snaps between various shades of heavy, electronically charged rock." Michael Berdan has listed punk rock acts Crossed Out and Anti Cimex and industrial metal acts Dead World and Spine Wrench as influences on the record, in addition to noise rock and black metal styles. Beats Per Minute's Todd Dedman drew comparisons to noise rock acts such as Helmet, Big Black and Cherubs, while likening Berdan's screams to those of David Yow. "Life in Remission", which features a rhythm section "similar to black metal", was conceived as a tribute to the works of Darkthrone, namely the records Hate Them (2003) and Sardonic Wrath (2004). The track "The Shadow of God's Hand" combines doom metal and thrash metal elements while "Dispatches from the Gutter" draws from "'92-era Ministry." The eight-minute closer track, "I Am the Cancer", was noted for its combination of "ambient drones and death metal breakdowns", in addition to its black metal and thrash metal riffs.

The lyrics on Shame were inspired by Berdan's personal experiences; according to Berdan, the record is about "self reflection and the role many of us have in making a mess of our own lives." Berdan has also stated that he was reading the works of Raymond Chandler, James Ellroy and Dashiell Hammett during the recording of the album. "Delco" is about his upbringing in Upper Darby Township, Pennsylvania, while the lyrics of the title track were inspired by Sam Peckinpah's Bring Me the Head of Alfredo Garcia and Will Christopher Baer's Kiss Me, Judas, among other works; one particular line of the latter track was interpolated from a Twilight Zone episode, "The Night of the Meek". "All We've Ever Wanted" and "This Won't End Well" deal with chronic depression and martyr complex, respectively, while self-destruction is the central topic on "I Am the Cancer".

== Critical reception ==
Professional ratings
Aggregate scores
Source	Rating
Metacritic	79/100
Review scores
Source	Rating
AllMusic	3.5/5 stars
Beats Per Minute	75/100
Blabbermouth.net	8/10
Exclaim!	8/10
Kerrang!	4/5
musicOMH	4/5 stars
Under the Radar	8/10

Shame has received generally positive reviews. At Metacritic, which assigns a normalized rating out of 100 to reviews from mainstream critics, the album has an average score of 79 based on 8 reviews, indicating "generally favorable reviews". AllMusic critic Paul Simpson has stated: "Like other Uniform records, Shame is bleak and chaotic, but feels unmistakably honest and true to life." Writing for Beats Per Minute, Todd Dedman considered the record to be "slightly more mature, perhaps even more confident, than some of the visceral slabs of pure adrenaline that marked their earlier releases." Dedman further described the album as "a record that plays with extremes but with a command over the noise created." Dom Lawson of Blabbermouth.net was positive in his review, stating: "The world is fucked, and Uniform know it, offering consolation or reprieve only via the revitalizing power of flat-out noise and untamed fury." Exclaim!'s Spencer Nafekh-Blanchette praised the record, calling it "thought-provoking music which is guaranteed to make listeners feel uncomfortable in their own skin."

Kerrang! critic wrote: "Reinventing a core element of themselves, Uniform present a side they have previously kept boiling angrily under a darkened surface." Describing Shame as "a slab of repugnant, malignant noise made with evil intent", Ross Horton of musicOMH praised the record, stating the band "deserves recognition as one of finest purveyors of heavy metal (of any kind) anywhere in the world." Under the Radar's Ian King thought that "range and muscle they've incrementally built up in their sound is bolstered here with the addition of drummer Mike Sharp." King further wrote: "There is no purism in Uniform's approach, which is a liberating factor in their industrial aggro vision."

== Track listing ==
All tracks written by Uniform.

1. "Delco" — 4:36
2. "The Shadow of God's Hand" — 3:54
3. "Life in Remission" — 4:25
4. "Shame" — 4:02
5. "All We've Ever Wanted" — 3:58
6. "Dispatches from the Gutter" — 1:54
7. "This Won't End Well" — 3:40
8. "I Am the Cancer" — 7:51

== Personnel ==
Album personnel as adapted from vinyl liner notes.

- Michael Berdan — vocals, programming, electronics
- Ben Greenberg — guitar, bass, electronics, production
- Mike Sharp — drums, electronics
- Garrett DeBlock — assistant engineering
- Randall Dunn — mixing
- Matt Colton — mastering
- Heather Gabel — artwork
