= Kristin Hayter =

American singer & pianist (born 1986)

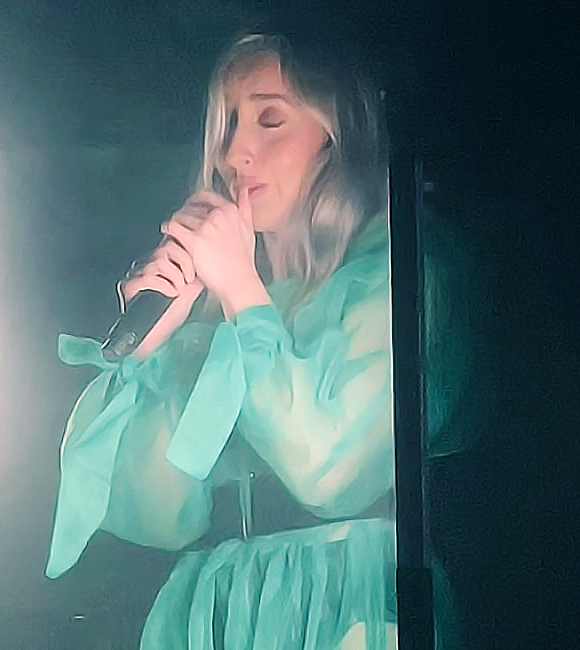
- Hayter at (Le) Poisson Rouge, 2022, New York City

Background information
- Also known as: Lingua Ignota; Reverend Kristin Michael Hayter
- Born: June 17, 1986 (age 40); Del Mar, California, U.S.
- Origin: Lincoln, Rhode Island, U.S.
- Genres: Neoclassical dark wave; neofolk; industrial; classical; noise; Christian music
- Occupations: Singer, composer, musician
- Instruments: Vocals; piano
- Years active: 2017–present
- Labels: Perpetual Flame Ministries; Sargent House; Profound Lore
- Website: linguaignota.net

Kristin Hayter (born June 17, 1986) is an American singer and pianist. She started releasing music in 2017 and performed under the stage name Lingua Ignota (Latin for "unknown language"). In 2023, citing the unhealthiness of reliving her trauma through her performances, Hayter retired the Lingua Ignota project and adopted a new persona under the moniker Reverend Kristin Michael Hayter.

Her professional music career began in 2017 with the self-released albums Let the Evil of His Own Lips Cover Him and All Bitches Die, which spread through word-of-mouth. Hayter's music caught the attention of Profound Lore Records, who re-issued All Bitches Die and released her third studio album, Caligula, in 2019, which was met with universal critical acclaim. Her fourth album, Sinner Get Ready, was released in 2021 on Sargent House and received more widespread critical acclaim. Her work as Lingua Ignota drew from her experiences as a survivor of domestic violence for musical and lyrical inspiration, and she describes her music as "survivor anthems". Her debut album as Reverend Kristin Michael Hayter, Saved!, came out in 2023.

== Early life ==
Hayter was born in Del Mar, California, in 1986. She felt like she didn't fit in in Southern California and was often bullied. About her hometown, she said: "I think of [Del Mar] as a sort of hell in the way that I was so different than everyone else when I was growing up and couldn't situate myself, couldn't find myself there at all." Hayter was raised Catholic and was educated in parochial schools until the sixth grade, when she entered public school. A teacher noticed her voice's natural vibrato when she was eight years old, which led to her becoming a church cantor, singing every week at her local church and beginning classical voice-training lessons. Despite a religious upbringing, she considered herself to be an atheist for several years starting as a teenager. However, in 2019, Hayter claimed she had "renounced her teenage atheism" and had become particularly interested in Roman Catholic iconography and concepts of divine retribution.

Hayter studied interdisciplinary creative arts at the School of the Art Institute of Chicago, earning a Bachelor of Fine Arts, and earned a Master of Fine Arts (MFA) degree in Literary Art from Brown University in Providence, Rhode Island, in 2016. She is also classically trained in piano and voice. Her undergraduate thesis, titled Architect and Vapor, deconstructed Johann Sebastian Bach's The Well-Tempered Clavier, and centered its poetry component on anorexia, a disorder Hayter had for over a decade. For her MFA thesis, titled Burn Everything Trust No One Kill Yourself, she created a 10,000-page manuscript (a page count selected because it was approximately Hayter's weight in paper) linking real-world examples of misogyny in music with her own personal life using a Markov chain. In her own words, it was composed of "lyrics, message board posts, and liner notes from subgenres of extreme music that mythologize misogyny, […] [and] court papers, audio recordings, and police filings from my own experiences of violence." In addition to the manuscript, her interdisciplinary performance included music and a black-and-white video projection with footage of serial killer Aileen Wuornos and burning buildings.

== Career ==
=== Early career ===
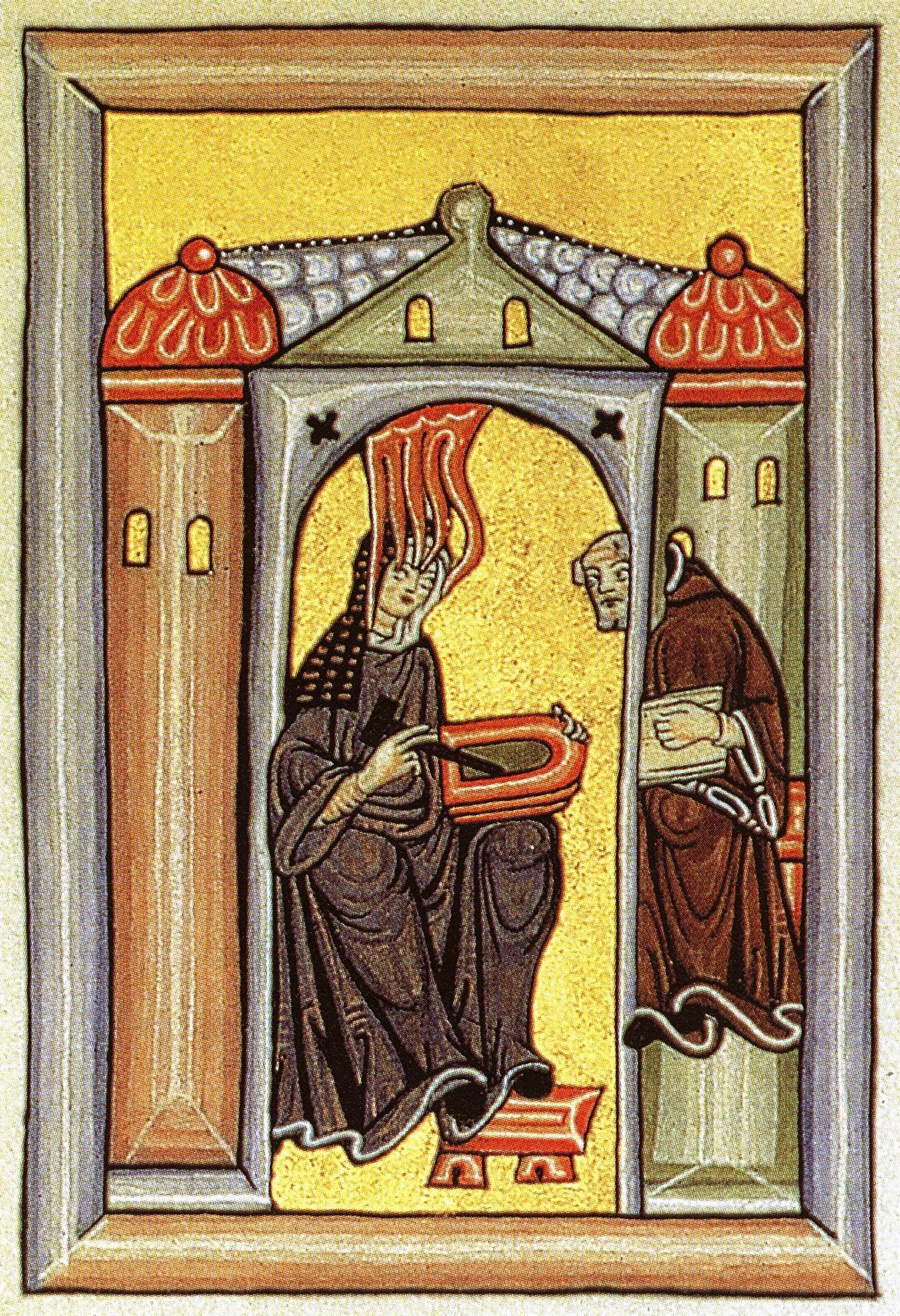
An illustration of Hildegard of Bingen receiving a vision from God and sketching on a wax tablet. The concept of God speaking through someone inspired Kristin Hayter's moniker "Lingua Ignota".

In high school, Hayter played in various metal garage bands with her friends.

=== Lingua Ignota (2017–2023) ===
==== Formation and self-released albums ====
Kristin Hayter began releasing music in 2017 under the moniker Lingua Ignota. Literally translating to "unknown language", the name is derived from the sacred constructed language Lingua Ignota created by the German Christian mystic Hildegard of Bingen. She chose this name because of her interest in glossolalia or ecstatic language, relating it to the idea of a "possession" or God speaking through a body. She said, "I'm trying to construct something that speaks the unspeakable, and so I use this sort of amalgam of musical devices to make my own sonic language which is meant to also be ecstatic or outside the self." Hayter released her first album under the name Lingua Ignota on Valentine's Day 2017. Titled Let the Evil of His Own Lips Cover Him, all of the proceeds were donated to the National Network to End Domestic Violence not-for-profit organization and combined original compositions used in her MFA thesis Burn Everything Trust No One Kill Yourself with a cover of the Inner Circle song "Bad Boys", famous for its use as the opening theme on Cops. There are about 10 songs from Hayter's Burn Everything Trust No One Kill Yourself thesis performance that may be released one day.

Four months later, Lingua Ignota self-released its second album, All Bitches Die, through Bandcamp in June 2017. The album consists of four "murder ballads" loosely inspired by Angela Browne's 1987 book When Battered Women Kill, a study of victim violence. Hayter did not plan to tour in support of the album and only expected to sell a few copies; however, word-of-mouth buzz surrounding All Bitches Die eventually made its way to Chris Bruni, owner of the Canadian extreme metal independent label Profound Lore Records. Profound Lore reissued All Bitches Die with updated artwork and a bonus track in 2018. Hayter said of the label: "Lingua Ignota is not a neutral project by any means and I've been asked to tone it down in various capacities since I've started. But Profound Lore only encouraged me to remain uncompromising and brutal, and that was ultimately what sold me to them as a label. I feel like they really believe in my work and won't ask me to dilute it to make it more fashionable or palatable." Lingua Ignota opened for experimental metal band The Body during their North American June–August 2018 tour, who Hayter credits for welcoming her into the experimental metal scene. The Body was touring in support of I Have Fought Against It, but I Can't Any Longer., an album that features guest vocals from Hayter.

==== Caligula, pandemic releases and Sightless Pit ====
After All Bitches Die, Lingua Ignota began working on a full-length album of cover songs that were reinterpreted in her unique music style, often with re-written lyrics. Songs from this session included Eminem's "Kim" and Foreigner's "I Want to Know What Love Is". A split EP with The Rita was released in 2019 that featured covers of Dolly Parton's "Jolene" and Scott Walker's "The Girls from the Streets". With the covers album still unannounced, Lingua Ignota released its third studio album, Caligula, through Profound Lore on July 19, 2019. The album is about one of her abusive relationships, specifically about "speaking out about abuse and feeling invalidated, and people who I thought were my friends no longer being my friends, and the crushing experience of how that feels."

A few years prior to its announcement, Hayter formed the supergroup side project Sightless Pit with Dylan Walker (Full of Hell) and Lee Buford (the Body). The noise project released its debut album, Grave of a Dog, on February 21, 2020, through Thrill Jockey.

Throughout the COVID-19 pandemic, particularly during the lockdowns and typically occurring on a Bandcamp Friday event, Hayter released several singles, EPs and demos. In March 2020, she released the harsh noise single "Above Us Only Sky". The song was a response to the viral "Imagine" video starring Gal Gadot and other celebrities that was intended to boost morale in the early stages of the pandemic but was critically panned. That same month, through the Adult Swim Singles Program she released the single "O Ruthless Great Divine Director," which she described as a song that "both addresses and embodies the hypocrite and the false prophet." Hayter then released three cover song singles: "Jolene" by Dolly Parton in May 2020, "Wicked Game" by Chris Isaak in August 2020 and "Kim" by Eminem in October 2020. In December 2020, Hayter released the home-recorded demos for the album Caligula. In February 2021 she released the EP Agnus Dei, which featured covers of songs by the Seattle punk band Iron Lung and the classical composers George Frideric Handel and Johann Sebastian Bach.

==== Sinner Get Ready and end of Lingua Ignota ====
In June 2021, Lingua Ignota shared a new song titled "Pennsylvania Furnace" and announced a new album, Sinner Get Ready, which was released August 6, 2021 on Sargent House.

In November 2022, Hayter announced her plans to retire the early catalog of Lingua Ignota in 2023 to either continue making music under the same name with a new direction or restart her music career under a new name. She cited the physical and emotional toll that writing and performing this material takes on her, elaborating: "This music has been excruciating to perform, and I know that what is healthiest for me is to stop performing it. I am proud of what I have accomplished so far and I look forward to what the future holds, I am in no way leaving music behind and will continue to build this world, but this world will look different." Her final performances of the Lingua Ignota material in the United States took place from April 28–30, 2023 at Chicago's Thalia Hall. Her final European tour was set to take place in May 2023, but was canceled a week before due to Hayter aggravating her spinal injury.

Hayter's final performance as Lingua Ignota took place on October 13 and 14, 2023 at London's Islington Assembly Hall. On November 3, 2023, the live album of the performance, The End: Live at Islington Assembly Hall, was released on Bandcamp. A live video for "Do You Doubt Me Traitor" and "All Bitches Die", shot and edited by the Diamond Bros, had also been released.

=== Perpetual Flame Ministries and Reverend Kristin Michael Hayter (2022–present) ===
In December 2022, Hayter founded the Perpetual Flame Ministries record label along with KW Campol of the band Vile Creature, and its first release was the first vinyl pressing of her debut Lingua Ignota album Let the Evil of His Own Lips Cover Him.

On August 22, 2023, she announced her debut album Saved! under the stage name Reverend Kristin Michael Hayter, which was released on October 20, 2023. It is described as "sonically and thematically, [...] both a logical conclusion to and a significant departure from Hayter's previous work as Lingua Ignota".

On February 2, 2024, Hayter released Saved! The Index, a compilation of 12 outtakes from the Saved! sessions, through Perpetual Flame Ministries.

== Musical style and influences ==
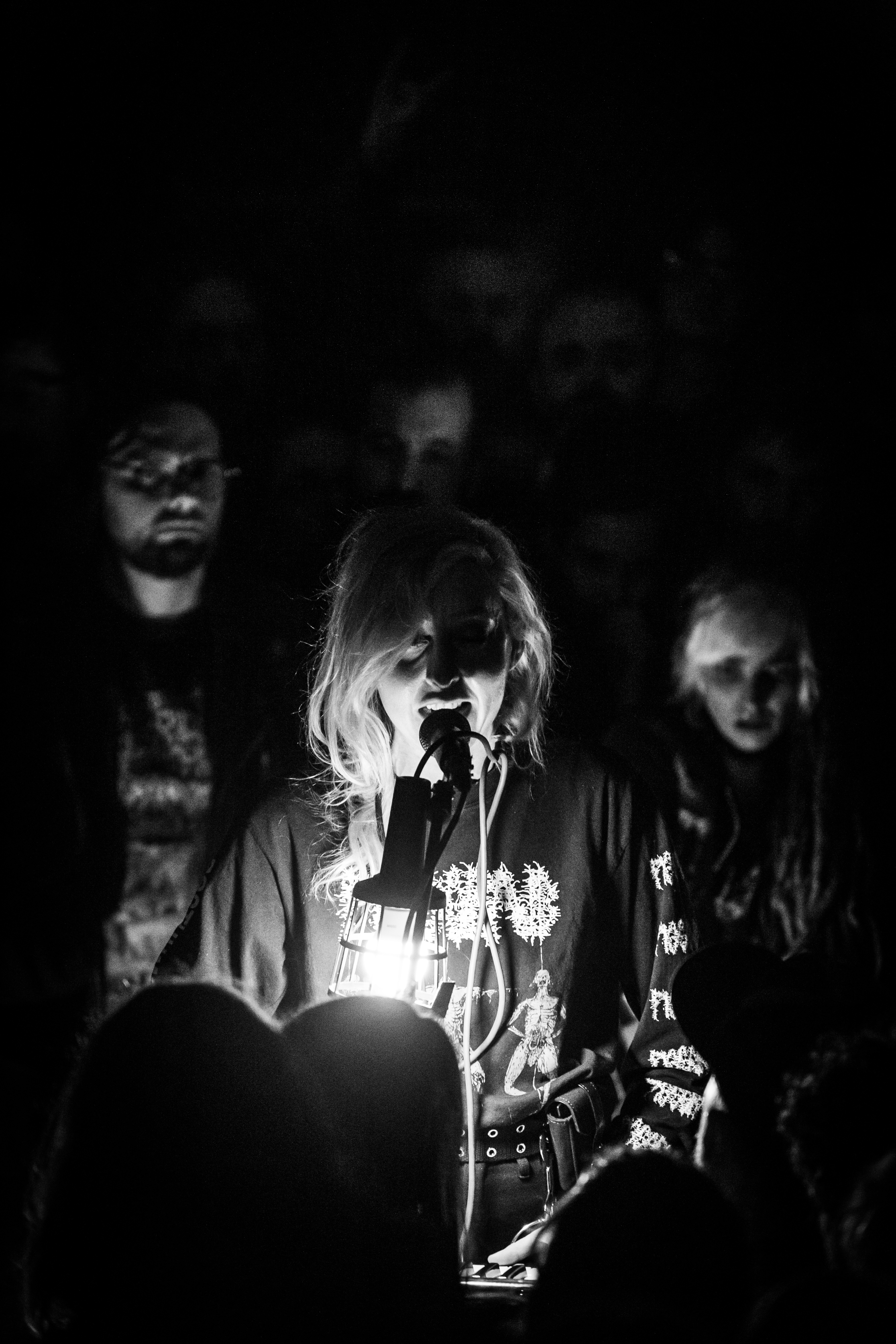
Lingua Ignota performing live at Roadburn Festival 2019

Lingua Ignota's two 2017 releases, Let the Evil of His Own Lips Cover Him and All Bitches Die, have been described using a wide range of musical genres, including baroque, black metal, classical, death industrial, doom metal, electronic, extreme metal, experimental, folk, harsh noise wall, metal, industrial, neoclassical, noise, opera, power electronics and spiritual. Her third studio album, Caligula, features fewer industrial and electronic influences. Hayter herself admits she has difficulty describing her musical genre.

Generally, Hayter draws inspiration from people "who've been through hard shit and keep going. The people who are still strong even if they're struggling to have their voices heard." She first became interested in rock music when she found a cassette tape copy of Nirvana's 1991 album Nevermind left behind by her cousin, and became "obsessed" with Kurt Cobain. She said, "I became enamored of [Cobain] and wanted to be him, wanted to make music like him, wanted to have a voice like him." The interest in Cobain inspired her to take singing lessons in grade school. By high school, her music tastes evolved into underground, extreme and complex artists including grindcore band the Locust, extreme metal band Cattle Decapitation, free jazz founder Ornette Coleman, experimental noise musician Aaron Dilloway, and avant-garde musician John Zorn. Both Trent Reznor and Nine Inch Nails had an early influence, and she estimates that she likely saw the music video for "Closer" when she was about 12 years old. She said of Nine Inch Nails' seminal 1994 second album: "The Downward Spiral was a gateway into industrial music and then noise and experimental. It's not too difficult to get from Nine Inch Nails to [Einstürzende] Neubauten to Merzbow." She is particularly influenced by vocalists, including German musician Blixa Bargeld (Einstürzende Neubauten, Nick Cave and the Bad Seeds), German new wave vocalist Klaus Nomi, American composer Cathy Berberian, Hungarian extreme metal vocalist Attila Csihar and Greek-American avant-garde musician Diamanda Galás. Hayter has also studied traditional Bulgarian polyphony.

Hayter is a survivor of domestic violence and draws from her experiences to write what she describes as "survivor anthems". After reading several books about surviving abuse, she noticed common themes and advice around gentleness, self-love and adopting new hobbies as coping mechanisms, but she felt this "enforced patriarchal models of civilized femininity". Instead, her music seeks to explore other avenues of survivorhood, such as rage and despair, and her lyrical approach to topics of violence are emotionally raw (from "All Bitches Die": "he beat me till my teeth were scattered / like pearls across the red, red ground"). Hayter's interest in performing extreme music, in part, stems from her multiple abusive relationships. One of her relationships was with a prominent figure in the Providence noise music scene, and his abusive behavior changed how she relates to the genre. In a separate interview, Hayter mentioned a relationship with someone who would not allow her to perform music, so as soon as the relationship was over, Hayter used Lingua Ignota to process what she went through. Though her music is empowering for women, Hayter has said her work intentionally has nothing in common with feminism or feminist theory. Instead, she's reclaiming what she describes as a "phallocentric" genre for the benefit of other survivors of abuse. She said:

I don't find most of the graphic depictions of (forgive my language here) 'sending this dumb slut back to hell hearing her final screams as my throbbing erection pounds her maggot-filled cunt' upsetting to my feminine sensibilities, most of it isn't even well-executed enough to be taken seriously, I just find that it occupies this weird space of being simultaneously very loaded and totally obsolete, especially when we consider that none of these guys are actually sodomizing female corpses in their free time. So my thoughts were to flip this whole paradigm and to try to make it meaningful, to reframe extreme imagery for survivors of violence, upon whom very dark shit has actually been visited, and who may have been confronted with the possibility of committing homicide in self-defense to survive an attack.

Lingua Ignota is known for its energetic and expressionistic live performances. A typical stage setup includes a keyboard with a "believe survivors" sticker and a video projection of violent, beautiful and biblical imagery. Hayter delivers vocals "that oscillate between the venomous and aggressive and the heartbreakingly mournful" and loses control of her body on stage, often hitting herself with objects and leaving bruises. Hayter describes her live performance as an "exorcism" in that, similar to her interest in Hildegard of Bingen's "Lingua Ignota" language given to her by God, she feels like a "conduit" with her performance flowing through her. She says, "I very much try to get to a place where [the performance] no longer feels like me, and where something else is moving through me, whether that's my abuser, or god, or something that can create a voice I wouldn't have myself." Repeatedly performing music about violence and surviving abusers can be emotionally taxing, but Hayter says she is motivated when other survivors tell her how much her music deeply resonates with them.

== Personal life ==
Kristin Hayter is a survivor of domestic violence and has been in several relationships that were "physically, emotionally, sexually, or psychologically" abusive, and hence, her music as Lingua Ignota often alludes to her own experiences with abuse, and perception of abusive relationships.

One abusive relationship lasted five years and in a separate interview she detailed an abusive relationship with "a very powerful noise musician in the Providence community". While the events of her abuse were traumatizing, she says what came after was worse, elaborating: "He was arrested for assaulting me and some of my most traumatic memories are from being re-victimized by police, by my school, and by the court. The system is so fucking broken for victims of sexual and domestic violence."

In October 2021 Hayter released a brief statement on twitter opening with "Alexis is an abuser... I wrote the record about it." (referring to SINNER GET READY), stating that she will take some time before speaking about her experience, as she wants it to "come from a place of clarity and strength". Hayter released her full statement in December 2021 via a Google Doc on Twitter, accusing her ex-boyfriend Alexis Marshall of sexual assault, rape, and "psychologically, emotionally, and sexually" abusing her throughout their relationship. She alleged that, during "one incident of objectifying, violent sex", Marshall had injured her spine and caused a spinal disc herniation, which led to her developing cauda equina syndrome that required surgery and ongoing physical therapy. Marshall denied all allegations of abuse and stated that he was "investigating legal options". Marshall's label Sargent House revealed that it had privately terminated Marshall in August 2021 when Hayter first alerted the label of Marshall's alleged abuse, and had waited to publicize their decision for Hayter's privacy.

== Discography ==
=== As Lingua Ignota ===
Studio albums

- Let the Evil of His Own Lips Cover Him (2017, self-released)
- All Bitches Die (2017, self-released)
- Caligula (2019, Profound Lore)
- Sinner Get Ready (2021, Sargent House)

Live albums

- The End: Live at Islington Assembly Hall (2023, self-released)

EPs

- Commissioned (split with The Rita) (2019, Total Black)
- Agnus Dei (2021, Sargent House)
- The Heart of Man (2021)
- Epistolary Grieving for Jimmy Swaggart (2021)

Singles

- "Above Us Only Sky" (2020)
- "O Ruthless Great Divine Director" (2020)
- "Jolene" (originally by Dolly Parton) (2020)
- "Wicked Game" (originally by Chris Isaak) (2020)
- "Kim" (originally by Eminem) (2020)
- "Katie Cruel" (traditional song) (2022)
- "Ein Traum" (Pentiment soundtrack) (2022)

Guest contributions

Year	Artist	Album	Track(s)
2019	The Body	Remixed	"Hallow Hollow" (remixed by Lingua Ignota)
2019	Street Sects	The Needle Drop	"Fourteen Frames"

=== As Kristin Hayter ===
Guest contributions

Year	Artist	Album	Track(s)
2018	The Body	I Have Fought Against It, but I Can't Any Longer.	"Can Carry No Weight" "Nothing Stirs" "An Urn" "Sickly Heart of Sand"
2019	Full of Hell	Weeping Choir	"Armory of Obsidian Glass"
2021	Alexis Marshall	House of Lull. House of When	
2023	Oxbow	Love's Holiday	"Lovely Murk"

=== With Sightless Pit ===
- Grave of a Dog (2020, Thrill Jockey)

=== As Reverend Kristin Michael Hayter ===
Studio albums

- Saved! (2023, Perpetual Flame Ministries)

Compilation albums

- Saved! The Index (2024, Perpetual Flame Ministries)
