= I've Seen All I Need to See =

2021 album by the Body

Studio album by the Body
- Released: January 29, 2021
- Recorded: 2019
- Studio: Machines with Magnets
- Genre: Death industrial; power electronics
- Length: 38:00
- Label: Thrill Jockey
- Producer: Seth Manchester

The Body chronology
Mental Wounds Not Healing (2018)	I've Seen All I Need to See (2021)

I've Seen All I Need to See is the eighth full-length studio album by the American experimental metal band the Body. The album was released on January 29, 2021, through Thrill Jockey.

== Background and release ==
On October 13, 2020, the Body announced the release of the album, I've Seen All I Need to See. The opening track, "A Lament" was served simultaneously as the album's lead single. It marks the duo's first non-collaborative studio album since I Have Fought Against It, but I Can't Any Longer. (2018). Recorded in 2019, the album was engineered by the duo's frequent collaborator, Seth Manchester, and mastered by Matt Colton. It features contributions from Chrissy Wolpert and vocalist Ben Eberle.

I think that's just a fancy way of saying that we tried to focus more on the distortion and reverb, which is how we sound live [...] we just tried to recreate that to the best of our ability.

— Lee Buford on the album, Apple Music

== Composition ==
I’ve Seen All I Need to See relies on a more stripped-down production that departs from the orchestral arrangements, operatic vocals, and contemporary pop and chopped-and-screwed hip-hop production of their past releases. The production employs drums, vocals, and violently overdriven guitars, deriving its sound from death industrial and power electronics. Described by the band "as an exploration of the extremes and micro-tonality of distortion" the album lyrically addresses themes of death and despondence. The record opens with a reading of Scottish poet Douglas Dunn's "The Kaleidoscope", that was written by him after the early death of his wife, Lesley Dunn, in 1981.

== Critical reception ==
Professional ratings
Aggregate scores
Source	Rating
Metacritic	80/100
Review scores
Source	Rating
AllMusic	3.5/5 stars
Exclaim!	8/10
musicOMH	4.5/5 stars
Pitchfork	8/10 stars
Uncut	3.5/5 stars

At Metacritic, which assigns a weighted average rating out of 100 to reviews from mainstream publications, this release received an average score of 80 based on 7 reviews, indicating "generally favourable reviews".

Pitchfork's Grayson Haver Currin said that the album embraces the "bluntly fatalistic" sound of the duo by being "mercilessly distilled and efficient, reminding us there's no time to waste." Similarly, Sam Shepherd of musicOMH called it "a brutal album", writing that "somehow, there's an odd clarity to be found amongst all the noise, distortion and decay." Paul Simpson of AllMusic lauded the duo's "piercing vocals" and regarded the album as "undeniably some of their most direct and punishing work." Exclaim! writer Max Heilman praised the stripped-down concept and impenetrable execution of the album and summarized it as "the purest summation of the Body's artistry."

== Track listing ==
I've Seen All I Need to See track listing
No.	Title	Length
1.	"A Lament"	5:54
2.	"Tied Up and Locked in"	2:55
3.	"Eschatological Imperative"	4:37
4.	"A Pain of Knowing"	5:40
5.	"The City is Shelled"	5:38
6.	"They are Coming"	4:44
7.	"The Handle / the Blade"	3:38
8.	"Path of Failure"	5:08
Total length:		38:00

== Personnel ==
Credits are adapted from AllMusic.

The Body

- Lee Buford – drums, vocals
- Chip King – guitar, vocals

Additional musicians

- Max Goldman – vocals
- Ben Eberle – vocals
- Seth Manchester – drums, programming, keyboard
- Chrissy Wolpert – piano, vocals

Production

- Seth Manchester – engineering, production
- Matt Colton – mastering
- Alexander Barton – art design, layout
