= Sinner Get Ready =

Studio album by Lingua Ignota
- Released: August 6, 2021
- Studio: Machines with Magnets (Pawtucket)
- Genres: Avant-garde; Appalachian music; classical; neoclassical dark wave
- Length: 55:53
- Label: Sargent House
- Producers: Kristin Hayter; Seth Manchester

Kristin Hayter chronology
Agnus Dei (2021)	Sinner Get Ready (2021)	Saved! (2023)

Lingua Ignota chronology
Agnus Dei (2021)	Sinner Get Ready (2021)	The End: Live at Islington Assembly Hall (2023)

Singles from Sinner Get Ready
- 1. "Pennsylvania Furnace" Released: June 17, 2021; 2. "Perpetual Flame of Centralia" Released: July 15, 2021

Sinner Get Ready (stylized in all caps) is the fourth studio album by American musician Kristin Hayter, and her last under her alias Lingua Ignota. Created in collaboration with producer and engineer Seth Manchester, it is the follow-up to Hayter's 2019 album Caligula. It was released on Sargent House on August 6, 2021, and was met with widespread acclaim from music critics.

== Critical reception ==
Professional ratings
Aggregate scores
Source	Rating
AnyDecentMusic?	8.0/10
Metacritic	83/100
Review scores
Source	Rating
Beats per Minute	88%
Exclaim!	9/10
The Guardian	4/5 stars
Kerrang!	4/5 stars
Loud and Quiet	9/10
Metal Hammer	4.5/5 stars
Mojo	4.5/5 stars
Pitchfork	8.0/10
PopMatters	8/10
Slant Magazine	4/5 stars

Sinner Get Ready received widespread critical acclaim. At Metacritic, which assigns a normalized rating out of 100 to reviews from professional publications, the release received an average score of 83, based on twelve reviews, indicating "universal acclaim". Aggregator AnyDecentMusic? gave the album a 8.0 out of 10 score, based on their assessment of the critical consensus.

Music critic and YouTuber Anthony Fantano gave the album a rare perfect score.

=== Accolades ===
Sinner Get Ready on year-end lists
Publication	List	Rank	Ref.
Beats per Minute	Top 50 Albums of 2021	3	
Crack	The Top 50 Albums of the Year	30	
Decibel	Top 40 Albums of 2021	14	
Exclaim!	50 Best Albums of 2021	32	
Junkee	The Best Albums of 2021	N/A	
Kerrang!	The 50 best albums of 2021	23	
Our Culture	The 50 Best Albums of 2021	16	
Paste	The 50 Best Albums of 2021	23	
Pitchfork	The 50 Best Albums of 2021	41	
PopMatters	The 75 Best Albums of 2021	23	
Rough Trade UK	Albums of the Year 2021	50	
Slant Magazine	The 50 Best Albums of 2021	39	

== Track listing ==
No.	Title	Length
1.	"The Order of Spiritual Virgins"	9:10
2.	"I Who Bend the Tall Grasses"	6:28
3.	"Many Hands"	5:15
4.	"Pennsylvania Furnace"	5:46
5.	"Repent Now Confess Now"	5:48
6.	"The Sacred Linament of Judgement"	5:22
7.	"Perpetual Flame of Centralia"	5:34
8.	"Man Is Like a Spring Flower"	7:16
9.	"The Solitary Brethren of Ephrata"	5:11
Total length:		55:53

Notes

- All tracks are stylized in all caps. For example, "The Order of Spiritual Virgins" is stylized as "THE ORDER OF SPIRITUAL VIRGINS".
- "The Sacred Linament of Judgment" features audio from televangelist Jimmy Swaggart's "I have sinned" speech.

== Personnel ==
Musicians

- Kristin Hayter – vocals (all tracks), piano (tracks 1, 4, 6–9), bowed banjo (1, 6), cello (1, 2, 5), organ (2), bells (2, 3, 6), bowed psaltery (3), mountain dulcimer (3), banjo (5), prepared piano (5, 8)
- Seth Manchester – prepared piano (1, 2, 8); oscillators, extended banjo (1); percussion (2, 4, 5), shruti box (3, 6); guitar, Moog (3); banjo (5), Moog Grandmother (8)
- Ryan Seaton – clarinets (1, 4, 8, 9), saxophones (1, 4, 5, 7–9), melodicas (1–3, 5, 8), castanets (1–3, 8), Tibetan cymbals (1–3), woodwind mouthpieces (1–5, 7, 9); wooden drum with animal skin and single snare, frame drums (1, 4); vocals, Doepfer MS-404, wooden shakers, singing bowl (1); bells (2), cowbell (2, 3), wooden flute (4, 5, 9); pennywhistle, Korg Wavestation (4, 8, 9); trumpet VST, harmonica (4, 9); Moog Voyager (5, 8, 9), saxophone neck (5, 9); mandolins, cello VST (7, 9); FM8 soft synth, Juno 106, Roland TB-303, Wurlitzer, tambourine, electric guitars (8); Eisenberg Vier soft synth (9)
- J. Mamana – banjo (8)

Technical

- Kristin Hayter – production, additional recording
- Seth Manchester – production, mixing, recording
- Ryan Seaton – additional production, additional recording, instrumental arrangements
- Chris Gehringer – mastering

Artwork

- Kristin Hayter – album photography (shooting, editing)
- Alexis Marshall – album photography assistance
- Ashley Rose Couture – mask
- Chimere Noire – layout design

== Charts ==
Chart performance for Sinner Get Ready
Chart (2021)	Peak position
UK Independent Albums (Official Charts)	11
US Heatseekers Albums (Billboard)	12
US Top Album Sales (Billboard)	36
US Top Current Albums (Billboard)	21
