= Wake in Fright (album) =

Studio album by Uniform
- Released: January 20, 2017
- Recorded: 2016
- Genre: Noise rock; industrial rock; industrial metal
- Length: 37:12
- Label: Sacred Bones
- Producer: Ben Greenberg

Uniform chronology
Perfect World (2015)	Wake in Fright (2017)	The Long Walk (2018)

Singles from Wake in Fright
- 1. "Tabloid" Released: November 30, 2016; 2. "The Killing of America" Released: January 5, 2017

Wake in Fright is the second studio album by the American industrial rock band Uniform. It was released on January 20, 2017 on Sacred Bones Records. The record was produced by the band's guitarist and programmer Ben Greenberg. The lead single from the record, "Tabloid," was released in November 2016. The second single, "The Killing of America," was accompanied by a music video by the time of the album's release.

The album takes its name from the 1971 film of the same name.

== Music and lyrics ==
Incorporating a heavier metal influence compared to its precursor, Wake in Fright features a blend of "electronic noise, hardcore and industrial rock" with elements from thrash metal and EBM. The record's sound was largely compared to Ministry's works, particularly The Land of Rape and Honey. According to Drowned in Sound's Benjamin Bland, the guitar sound on the record "rekindles the nihilistic psychedelia at the heart of industrial and marries it with unrelenting Converge-esque metallic hardcore," while the rhythm tracks were labeled as "Godflesh-gone-thrash drum programming." Exclaim!'s Ian Gormely noted that vocalist Michael Berdan's "harrowing vocals" were "pushed to the back of the mix in favour of general noise and drums that run the gamut from industrial motorik to grindcore blast beats." On the album, the band sought to incorporated more sample layering and sequencing, which they achieved through Pro Tools. Movie samples, sound effects, foley tracks and different drum machine samples were used in layered; explosion and gunshot sounds were also used on rhythm tracks as kicks and snares, respectively.

Berdan wrote the lyrics in between fall of 2015 and the winter to early spring of 2016. While the lyrics largely drew from Berdan's personal struggles, namely insomnia, anxiety and "an absence of hope for a positive future," many critics drew parallels between them and the socio-political climate in the United States amidst the 2017 inauguration of Donald Trump at the time of the album's release. Berdan sought to portray "human experiences that transcend politics" and stated that "none of these songs are meant to speak to anything more than a feeling that a character is experiencing," with the exception of "The Killing of America," a song about gun violence in the United States. The tracks such as "Habit" and "Bootlicker" deal with alcoholism, while "Tabloid" relates to a person's downward spiral with negative thoughts. Both "The Light at the End" tracks are about substance abuse while "Night of Fear" deals with Berdan's insomnia.

Many titles from Wake in Fright were appropriated from media such as exploitation films and pulp novels, including The Light at the End, The Killing of America and The Lost.

== Critical reception ==
Professional ratings
Aggregate scores
Source	Rating
Metacritic	80/100
Review scores
Source	Rating
AllMusic	3.5/5 stars
Drowned in Sound	7/10
Exclaim!	8/10
The Line of Best Fit	7.5/10
Pitchfork	8.0/10

Wake in Fright has received generally positive reviews. At Metacritic, which assigns a normalized rating out of 100 to reviews from mainstream critics, the album has an average score of 80 based on 10 reviews, indicating "generally favorable reviews". AllMusic critic Paul Simpson has noted the political themes of the record, stating: "Terrifying and violent, Wake in Fright is a perfectly logical response to the state of the world." Drowned in Sound's Benjamin Bland regarded Wake in Fright as "a more consistently provocative record than the duo’s debut," writing that the record's "selling point is that – no matter how well it binds together varied musical strands – it is that rare contemporary record that convincingly portrays real hostility." Ian Gormely of Exclaim! remarked the influence of Ministry on the record, while concluding that "the pair never succumb to mimicry or idolatry."

The Line of Best Fit critic Ian King has stated: "The album digs for transcendence by jackhammering away at the ills and addictions that afflict individuals and hold us back collectively." Andy O'Connor of Pitchfork thought that both band members "have found new sides to themselves" with respect to their past work and wrote: "Their fevered, relentless sophomore record is the sound of clawing for survival and sanity." The Quietus's Tom Howells stated: "As it stands, Wake In Fright is a misanthropic social/personal/political blank cheque as bleak in outlook as it is righteously harrowing in sound."

== Track listing ==
All tracks written by Michael Berdan and Ben Greenberg.

1. "Tabloid" — 3:15
2. "Habit" — 4:30
3. "The Lost" — 4:49
4. "The Light at the End (Cause)" — 4:36
5. "The Killing of America" — 4:04
6. "Bootlicker" — 5:03
7. "Night of Fear" — 5:01
8. "The Light at the End (Effect)" — 5:52

== Personnel ==
Album personnel as adapted from the LP liner notes:

- Michael Berdan — vocals
- Ben Greenberg — guitar, mixing, production
- Josh Bonati — mastering
- Adam Helms — cover art
- Sacred Bones Records — layout
