= Saved! (album) =

Studio album by Reverend Kristin Michael Hayter
- Released: October 20, 2023
- Studio: Machines with Magnets (Pawtucket)
- Genres: Avant-garde; Southern gospel; tape music
- Length: 46:23
- Label: Perpetual Flame Ministries

Kristin Hayter chronology
Sinner Get Ready (2021)	Saved! (2023)	The End: Live at Islington Assembly Hall (2023)

Reverend Kristin Michael Hayter chronology
Saved! (2023)	Saved! The Index (2024)

Singles from Saved!
- 1. "All of My Friends Are Going to Hell" Released: August 22, 2023; 2. "I Will Be with You Always" Released: September 20, 2023

Saved! (stylised in all-caps) is the fifth studio album by American avant-garde musician Kristin Hayter and the first under the alias Reverend Kristin Michael Hayter. It was released on October 20, 2023, through her own label, Perpetual Flame Ministries. It documents her attempt at salvation through religion, a topic featured heavily under her previous alias, Lingua Ignota. The album fixates on a Christian message. Hayter produced the album alongside Seth Manchester. Saved! received critical acclaim upon release, with critics praising Hayter's lyricism and delivery.

== Background ==
On November 2, 2022, Hayter revealed that she would retire the persona Lingua Ignota and the accompanying catalog. In a statement, she explained that it is "not healthy for me to relive my worst experiences over and over" through the music of her former alias. The musician announced the debut album under the name Reverend Kristin Michael Hayter, an allusion to her real name Kristin Hayter, on August 22, 2023. A first single titled "All of My Friends Are Going to Hell" with a video directed by herself was shared the same day. The project is set to include a mix of "gospel" classics and "new original music". Hayter created Saved! alongside her long-time collaborator Seth Manchester. The album marks the first release under her new label Perpetual Flame Ministries, which she launched in December 2022.

Hayter herself declared the album to be the "Book of Revelations (sic) within", in which she reaches "new levels of unhinged, spiritually and sonically". After leaving "Lingy" behind, she is now seeking herself, explaining, "evangelical conversion becomes an allegory for undoing and rebuilding". In order to achieve that, she quotes: "To live ye must be born again". It signifies an "earnest attempt to achieve salvation" and comes across as an "apocalyptic revelation on the complex, sometimes ugly, always nonlinear process of healing". After hearing the album, Nat Lacuna of New Noise Magazine found Saved! to be "quite a departure" from Hayter's previous work, as the musical arrangements consist "mostly of piano and vocals". Hayter and Manchester started out recording on a 4-track which then "degraded in a series of small half-broken cassette players".

== Critical reception ==
Professional ratings
Aggregate scores
Source	Rating
Metacritic	80/100
Review scores
Source	Rating
Exclaim!	7/10
Kerrang!	4/5
The Line of Best Fit	8/10
Paste	9.4/10
Pitchfork	7.5/10

Saved! received a score of 80 out of 100 on review aggregator Metacritic based on eight critics' reviews, indicating "generally favorable reviews". Nick Ruskell of Kerrang! wrote that "Kristin is in a different place", calling it "an album built on twisted folk-horror Americana that still features so much darkness and painful emotion, but also has a desperate hope to it that there is better to be found". Reviewing the album for Exclaim!, Kyle Kohner wrote that Hayter "toes the line between the horrifying hell still burning within and a hope-feigning religious euphoria" and while she "doesn't quite have the answers, [...] the quest is what drives the reverend to take up her cross with such fiery passion".

John Amen of The Line of Best Fit found Hayter's "delivery is as anguished as ever, even if her perspective reflects a religious or teleological clarity. All things considered, Hayter demonstrates that she's as compelling when testifying from an evangelical perch as when navigating an existential crisis". Annie Parnell of Paste summarized that "the result is an unspooled revelation, a supplicant's distorted glee—a celebration which Hayter leaves pointedly open-ended". Parnell concluded that the Saved! "professes a simple, guaranteed salvation — but only if you insist, through blood and iron, on taking it".

== Track listing ==
Saved! track listing
No.	Title	Length
1.	"I'm Getting Out While I Can"	3:38
2.	"All of My Friends Are Going to Hell"	4:39
3.	"There Is Power in the Blood"	0:52
4.	"Idumea"	3:55
5.	"I Will Be with You Always"	6:33
6.	"Precious Lord, Take My Hand"	1:34
7.	"May This Comfort and Protect You"	4:11
8.	"The Poor Wayfaring Stranger"	7:32
9.	"Nothing But the Blood"	1:10
10.	"I Know His Blood Can Make Me Whole"	4:13
11.	"How Can I Keep from Singing?"	8:06
Total length:		46:23

Notes

- All tracks are stylized in all caps.

== Personnel ==
- Kristin Hayter – vocals, prepared piano
- Seth Manchester – recording

== Charts ==
Chart performance for Saved
Chart (2023)	Peak position
UK Album Downloads (Official Charts)	34
UK Independent Albums (Official Charts)	46
