= The Long Walk (album) =

Studio album by Uniform
- Released: August 17, 2018
- Studio: Strange Weather (Williamsburg, Brooklyn)
- Genre: Industrial metal
- Length: 37:27
- Label: Sacred Bones
- Producer: Ben Greenberg

Uniform chronology
| Wake in Fright (2017) | The Long Walk (2018) | Shame (2020) |

Singles from The Long Walk
- 1. "The Walk" Released: June 21, 2018

The Long Walk is the third studio album by American industrial rock band Uniform. It was released on August 17, 2018 by Sacred Bones Records. Produced by the band's guitarist, Ben Greenberg, it is the band's first record to feature a live drummer: Greg Fox of Zs and Liturgy contributed to its recording. The lead single from the album, "The Walk", was released in June 2018.

The album takes its name from the Stephen King novel of the same name.

== Background and recording ==
Recording the previous releases with a drum machine, the band sought to incorporate a live drummer during the sessions for The Long Walk; they had toyed with the idea previously. Greg Fox showed up the last minute, as the first drummer had to quit due to an illness. The band took on a lengthy pre-production process to redesign their guitar and synthesizer rigs to adapt their usual setup for live drumming in studio and gigs; a hybrid acoustic and electronic drum kit was also built for Fox. Guitarist Ben Greenberg used a system of drum triggers and pedals to control synthesizers while playing guitar. In contrast to the past album sessions, the band recorded the arrangements live, editing arrangements as they play. Fox learned his drum parts on the spot. The sessions, which reportedly lasted for three days, occurred in the Strange Weather studio at Williamsburg, Brooklyn in the first half of 2018. Greenberg opted to use magnetic tapes for recording instead of computers: he wanted the record to "sound shredded but not lo-fi—a true tape recording,” likening the desired sound to "the dream sequence in ‘Terminator 2’ when the nuke goes off near the playground."

A mini-documentary that documents the recordings sessions was released on July 10, 2018. It was shot by Revolver contributor Sean Stout mostly on 8 mm film.

== Music and lyrics ==
The sound on The Long Walk has been described as industrial metal, with the tracks except "Found" and "Peaceable Kingdom" taking on a "sludgy, midtempo industrial metal groove." According to Pitchfork's Andy O'Connor, the crossover influence on Wake in Fright is mostly eschewed "in favor of mangled, mid-paced riffing, like Celtic Frost recorded through a series of budget amps and distortion pedals, then played at deafening volume." Noting the lo-fi and noisy production of the record, Paul Simpson of AllMusic likened the album to "a recording of a basement punk show during the '80s, then dug up from the vaults and remixed with modern equipment, only to make it sound harsher and uglier." Despite the application of noise and distortion on the tracks, the songs are largely based on rock structures. Critics also noted that Fox's drumming introduces "a slight imbalance" and "unpredictability" to the band's sound.

A large portion of the album's lyrics deal with "paradoxes in spirituality" and criticism of organized religion. Vocalist Michael Berdan drew from his Catholic upbringing while writing the lyrics.

== Critical reception ==
Professional ratings
Aggregate scores
| Source | Rating |
|---|---|
| Metacritic | 75/100 |
Review scores
| Source | Rating |
| AllMusic | 3.5/5 stars |
| Exclaim! | 5/10 |
| The Line of Best Fit | 8.5/10 |
| Pitchfork | 7.6/10 |

The Long Walk has received generally positive reviews. At Metacritic, which assigns a normalized rating out of 100 to reviews from mainstream critics, the album has an average score of 75 based on 7 reviews, indicating "generally favorable reviews". AllMusic critic Paul Simpson described the record as "some of Uniform's most challenging, disrupting work yet" while noting the live drumming to be "much rawer and more direct" than the programmed beats on its predecessor, Wake in Fright. The Line of Best Fit's Evan Lilly gave the record a positive review, stating: "While touching briefly on new ground, The Long Walk is generally what you’d expect it to be, but with minor variations alongside the engrossing quality that make Uniform so distinct to begin with." Pitchfork regarded The Long Walk as "Uniform’s most stylistically consistent record yet for all its controlled chaos."

Reviewing for PopMatters, Spyros Stasis has stated: "Uniform shed light to the ugly side of the human psyche, and while they do so in a very explicit and expressive way, it feels like there is still much more they can dig up to the surface." In a mixed review, Exclaim! critic Matthew Blenkarn regarded the record as "monotonous and exhausting," stating: "Where Wake in Fright felt lean and energetic, The Long Walk is bloated and tired, not so much a fulfilling, purposeful exercise as a slow crawl to nowhere in particular."

== Track listing ==
1. "The Walk" — 5:30
2. "Inhuman Condition" — 4:15
3. "Found" — 3:50
4. "Transubstantiation" — 4:35
5. "Alone in the Dark" — 3:46
6. "Headless Eyes" — 3:57
7. "Anointing of the Sick" — 4:46
8. "Peaceable Kingdom" — 6:48

== Personnel ==
Album personnel as adapted from the CD liner notes:

- Michael Berdan — vocals
- Ben Greenberg — guitar, electronics, production
- Greg Fox — drums, electronics
- Garret De Block — assistant engineering
- Josh Bonati — mastering
- John Conn — cover art, photography
- Joshua Zucker-Pluda — photography
