= I Shall Die Here =

Studio album by the Body
- Released: April 1, 2014
- Genre: Doom metal; industrial; dark ambient
- Length: 39:58
- Label: RVNG Intl.
- Producer: The Haxan Cloak

The Body chronology
Christs, Redeemers (2013)	I Shall Die Here (2014)	The Body/Sandworm (2014)

I Shall Die Here is the fourth studio album by American sludge metal band the Body. Released on April 1, 2014, through RVNG Intl. record label, the album was produced by British electronic musician the Haxan Cloak.

== Critical reception ==
Professional ratings
Aggregate scores
Source	Rating
Metacritic	80/100
Review scores
Source	Rating
AllMusic	4/5 stars
Exclaim!	9/10
Fact	3.5/5
Pitchfork	7.8/10
The Skinny	4/5 stars
Tiny Mix Tapes	4/5 discs

Upon its release, I Shall Die Here received positive reviews from music critics. At Metacritic, which assigns a normalized rating out of 100 to reviews from critics, the album received an average score of 80, which indicates "generally favorable reviews", based on 9 reviews. AllMusic critic Gregory Heaney wrote: "While words like "fun" or "entertaining" aren't likely to ever be used to describe I Shall Die Here, those with the fortitude to endure its savagery and stare into the abyss will definitely know what they're made of." Natalie Zina Walschots of Exclaim! described the album as "a journey to the edge of mortality, an experiment in the musical possibilities of horror; it is troubling, altering and sublime." Fact magazine's Louis Pattison stated: "I Shall Die Here is a bracing listen, certainly no easier than The Body’s conventional albums, and in its application of intense studio treatment, at times perhaps even more intense." Nevertheless, Pattison also thought that the album is "a whole lot better" than the Body’s 2013 album for Thrill Jockey, Christ, Redeemers, eventually concluding: "Here’s a record, then, that pulls off a clever sort of flourish: both communicating a horrific plunge into darkness, while showing all its participants in the best possible light."

Pitchfork critic Nick Neyland wrote: "The execution of I Shall Die Here is so full-blooded, so committed to forcing your head underwater to the point of blackout, that it's hard not to view this as a singular piece, out there on its own, in a place most people wouldn't want to go anywhere near." The Skinny's Bram E. Gieben commented: "From the plodding, scream-infested bass wash of opener "To Carry the Seeds of Death Within Me", this record speaks to your gut." Matthew Phillips of Tiny Mix Tapes wrote that the band "is seeking something more basic, using techniques that link us on a primal level to that most universal of human certainties: death itself. Together, they give us both the forest and the harpies, the tortured and the torturer." The Wire thought that the album's "meeting of stark electronic textures and rhythms with monstrous guitars evokes Godflesh's Pure."

=== Accolades ===
Year-end lists for I Shall Die Here
Publication	List	Rank	Ref.
Exclaim!	Top 10 Metal & Hardcore Albums of 2014	9	
The Quietus	Quietus Albums of the Year 2014	26	
Tiny Mix Tapes	Favorite 50 Music Releases of 2014	49	

== Track listing ==
All tracks are written by Chip King and Lee Buford.

I Shall Die Here track listing
No.	Title	Length
1.	"To Carry the Seeds of Death Within Me"	6:30
2.	"Alone All the Way"	5:22
3.	"The Night Knows No Dawn"	7:38
4.	"Hail to Thee, Everlasting Pain"	5:58
5.	"Our Souls Were Clean"	5:23
6.	"Darkness Surrounds Us"	9:11
Total length:		39:58

== Personnel ==
The Body

- Chip King — guitars, vocals
- Lee Buford — drums, programming

Other personnel

- The Haxan Cloak — production, recording, arrangement, synthesizer, programming
- Keith Souza — drums, programming
- Seth Manchester — drums, programming
- Gus Martin — bass guitar
- Scott Reber — synthesizer, noises
- Laura Gulley — violin, viola
- Ben Eberle — vocals
- Kathryn Teague — vocals
- Rashad Becker — mastering
- Will Work for Good — design
