= Perfect World (Uniform album) =

Studio album by Uniform
- Released: July 8, 2015
- Genres: Noise rock; industrial rock
- Length: 38:26
- Labels: 12XU, Alter Records
- Producer: Ben Greenberg

Uniform chronology
Perfect World (2015)	Wake in Fright (2016)

Perfect World is the debut studio album by the American industrial rock band Uniform. It was released on July 8, 2015 by 12XU and Alter Records. Produced by the band's guitarist and programmer Ben Greenberg, it features contributions from former Coil member Drew McDowall.

== Background and music ==
The style on Perfect World draws heavily from industrial and hardcore, while featuring elements such as doom-metal guitar licks. Structurally, the tracks are reliant on the drum machine; a large portion of the record eschews traditional rock structures. PopMatters's Ian King has stated that the record "takes Throbbing Gristle’s abrasiveness, throws it in a pressure cooker with the cold, old-tech repetition of the Normal, and then slices through it all with lashing guitar distortion," while Raymond Cummings of Spin described it as "an inchoate stutter-shove equal parts post-punk and first-album Suicide with a pinch of debilitating noise tossed in for good measure." Singer Michael Berdan's vocals were compared to those of GG Allin, Jello Biafra and Lee Ving.

During the recording, the band used a minimal setup with a single bass synthesizer and drum machine in addition to vocals: "a cheap ’80s preamp marketed to metal kids" was used for guitar tracks while the rhythm section was recorded with an Akai Professional XR20 drum machine.

== Critical reception ==
Professional ratings
Aggregate scores
Source	Rating
Metacritic	78/100
Review scores
Source	Rating
Paste	7.9/10
Pitchfork	7.6/10

Perfect World has received generally positive reviews. At Metacritic, which assigns a normalized rating out of 100 to reviews from mainstream critics, the album has an average score of 78 based on 5 reviews, indicating "generally favorable reviews". Dave Cantor of Paste stated that "the furious yowling on each track off Uniform’s Perfect World belies some pretty arresting compositional finery." Cantor further remarked that "steadily digesting the amount of hate injected into each second of the group’s first full-length could just be an emotional bummer." Pitchfork's Andy O'Connor wrote: "Perfect World's six songs work within the limits of hardcore and industrial to create a monolithic record that manages to slyly underminine its central thrust." Reviewing for PopMatters, Ian King described the album as an "exhilarating and exhausting art that shrouds an exposed core with sonic brutality." Spin's Raymond Cummings thought that "the duo leaven Perfect World's miserablism with just enough smeared hooks and doom-metal licks to make converts of the underground faithful and the casual headbanger; as tortured triumphs go, this debut is a doozy." Brendan Telford of The Quietus wrote: "The album kicks against the pricks only because it's what it is used to, programmed to, expected to do - but underneath the scuzzed squalls are souls filleted by raw emotion, rough circumstance, riled ambiguity and ritualistic hearsay."

Pitchfork contributor Andy O'Connor included the album as number 16 on his list of "The Best Metal Albums of 2015."

== Track listing ==
All tracks written by Michael Berdan and Ben Greenberg.

1. "Perfect World" — 6:37
2. "Indifference" — 6:04
3. "Footnote" — 6:21
4. "Buyers Remorse" — 5:47
5. "Lost Causes" (feat. Drew McDowall) — 8:34
6. "Learning to Forget" — 5:03

== Personnel ==
Album personnel as adapted from the LP liner notes:

- Michael Berdan — vocals
- Ben Greenberg — guitar, electronics, production
- Drew McDowall — synthesizer (5)
- Josh Bonati — mastering
- Uniform — recording
- Mark McCoy — artwork
