= Imagine (Gal Gadot video) =

2020 Instagram video by Gal Gadot

A screenshot of the video uploaded to Instagram

"Imagine" is a 2020 video posted by Israeli actress Gal Gadot on 18 March, featuring herself and two dozen celebrity friends singing a rendition of the song "Imagine" by John Lennon, which was intended to raise morale in the face of the COVID-19 pandemic. The video was poorly received.

== Origins ==
Gadot organized the video with help from Kristen Wiig. She told InStyle: "The pandemic was in Europe and Israel before it came here (to the United States) in the same way. I was seeing where everything was headed." So she told Wiig, "Listen, I want to do this thing."

Gadot said she was inspired to make the video after seeing a man from Italy play "Imagine" on his trumpet from his balcony.

=== Participants ===
The following is a list of participants, in order of appearance.

- Gal Gadot
- Kristen Wiig
- Jamie Dornan
- Labrinth
- James Marsden
- Sarah Silverman
- Eddie Benjamin
- Jimmy Fallon
- Natalie Portman
- Zoë Kravitz
- Sia
- Lynda Carter
- Amy Adams
- Leslie Odom Jr.
- Pedro Pascal
- Chris O'Dowd
- Dawn O'Porter
- Will Ferrell
- Mark Ruffalo
- Norah Jones
- Ashley Benson
- Kaia Gerber
- Cara Delevingne
- Annie Mumolo
- Maya Rudolph

== Reception ==
The video was nearly universally panned, with critics dismissing it as an ineffective, out-of-touch, "cringey" response to the pandemic; Jon Caramanica of The New York Times called it "an empty and profoundly awkward gesture". Gadot later acknowledged the video did not garner the positive reaction that had been intended but was unapologetic in explaining the thinking behind it. Gadot acknowledged the video ended up being in "poor taste" but maintained that it was made with "pure intentions".

The video attained 4.5 million views on Gadot's Instagram page within 16 hours, and people posted themselves singing as well, which Gadot re-shared.

== Parodies ==
The video was parodied by comedian Zack Fox, whose version was based on the song "Slob on My Knob" by Tear Da Club Up Thugs. Fox's version featured appearances from Eric André, Thundercat, 6lack, Quinta Brunson, Langston Kerman, and Chuck Inglish, among others.

British comedian Joe Lycett (then named Hugo Boss) parodied the video which also featured Greg James, Rob Beckett, Nish Kumar, Katherine Ryan, Noel Fielding, Suzi Ruffell, Alex Horne, Paul Chuckle, Rosie Jones, Josh Widdicombe, Harry Hill and Joel Dommett, in which a lyric in each cut was replaced with the word "bastard".

American singer-songwriter John Mayer also parodied the video in an episode of his Instagram talk show Current Mood. Mayer inserted clips of himself singing "Imagine" by Ariana Grande into Gadot's original video.

The video was also parodied on the series The Boys, in the opening scene of the episode "Herogasm", in which the character the Deep, himself a parody of Aquaman, mirrors Gadot's comments about feeling philosophical before starting to sing "Imagine" followed by celebrities such as Patton Oswalt, Josh Gad, Mila Kunis, Ashton Kutcher, Elizabeth Banks, Kumail Nanjiani, Aisha Tyler, and Rose Byrne, individually singing a line of the song each.

The video was also parodied by Bob Odenkirk and David Cross during a virtual reunion of Mr. Show, where the participants sang "Eat It" by "Weird Al" Yankovic. The cover featured an array of Mr. Show cast members, as well as actors and actresses from both Breaking Bad and Better Call Saul, including Rhea Seehorn, Michael Mando, Michael McKean, and Bryan Cranston. Sarah Silverman, who appeared in the original, also joined, along with Rachel Bloom and Yankovic himself.

== Remixes ==
American jazz musician and YouTuber Charles Cornell analyzed the video from a musical standpoint, critiquing the lack of coordination in maintaining a consistent musical key and rhythm. He then created and performed a new version with his own backing music; using the celebrities' vocals put to a consistent meter and with relevant key changes to transition between singers.

Experimental musician Lingua Ignota also remixed the audio of Gadot's version into a harsh noise wall song titled "Above Us Only Sky".
