= Ascending a Mountain of Heavy Light =

Studio album (collaboration) by the Body and Full of Hell
- Released: November 17, 2017
- Genre: Experimental metal
- Length: 34:30
- Label: Thrill Jockey

The Body chronology
One Day You Will Ache Like I Ache (2016)	Ascending a Mountain of Heavy Light (2017)	A Home on Earth (2018)

Full of Hell chronology
Trumpeting Ecstasy (2017)	Ascending a Mountain of Heavy Light (2017)	Weeping Choir (2019)

Ascending a Mountain of Heavy Light is a collaborative studio album between American extreme metal bands the Body and Full of Hell. Released on November 17, 2017 through Thrill Jockey, the album serves as the Body's 12th studio album and Full of Hell's sixth studio album. It's also the second collaborative album between the two bands, following 2016's One Day You Will Ache Like I Ache. Ascending a Mountain of Heavy Light was promoted with an online stream of "Earth is a Cage" in August 2017.

== Reception ==
Professional ratings
Aggregate scores
Source	Rating
Metacritic	82/100
Review scores
Source	Rating
AllMusic	4/5 stars
Exclaim!	8/10
Pitchfork	7.8/10

The album was met with generally positive reviews from music critics. At Metacritic, which assigns a normalized rating out of 100 to reviews from mainstream publications, the album received an average score of 82/100 based on eight reviews, indicating "universal acclaim". Grayson Haver Currin of Pitchfork gave the album a 7.8/10 rating, stating: "Heavy Light might be their clearest recorded indication of that complex personality, of how there's often a sense of zeal and color in what seem like obscenely dark moments. The Body and Full of Hell sound delighted while making this record, new partners becoming comfortable enough to admit just how weird they are." Paul Simpson of AllMusic gave the album a four-out-of-five star rating, concluding: "Utterly unpredictable and thoroughly devastating, this album slays from start to finish, and upholds both acts' reputations as groundbreaking artists." Cole Firth of Exclaim! gave the album an 8/10 rating, concluding: "This is the kind of odd, idiosyncratic record that makes collaboration so compelling; whether or not it appeals to you, there's absolutely no way you've heard a metal release quite like it this year." Both Simpson and Currin expressed that the album was an improvement upon One Day You Will Ache Like I Ache. Currin ended his review expressing interest in a follow-up collaboration, stating: "A second collaboration between the Body and Full of Hell seemed unnecessary; the third, somehow, now seems imperative."

== Track listing ==
No.	Title	Length
1.	"Light Penetrates"	3:35
2.	"Earth is a Cage"	3:14
3.	"The King Laid Bare"	3:45
4.	"Didn't the Night End"	5:11
5.	"Our Love Conducted with Shields Aloft"	4:48
6.	"Master's Story"	4:52
7.	"Farewell, Man"	4:33
8.	"I Did Not Want to Love You So"	4:32
