= I Have Fought Against It, but I Can't Any Longer. =

Studio album by the Body
- Released: May 11, 2018
- Recorded: 2017
- Studio: Machines with Magnets
- Genre: Noise, power electronics
- Length: 49:35
- Label: Thrill Jockey
- Producer: Seth Manchester, Keith Souza

The Body chronology
A Home on Earth (2017)	I Have Fought Against It, but I Can't Any Longer. (2018)	Mental Wounds Not Healing (2018)

I Have Fought Against It, but I Can't Any Longer. is the sixth full-length studio album by the American experimental metal band the Body. The album was released on May 11, 2018, through Thrill Jockey. The band have described the album as their most ambitious to date, featuring samples of their own past recordings. The album's title is an excerpt from Virginia Woolf's suicide letter.

== Critical reception ==
Professional ratings
Aggregate scores
Source	Rating
Album of the Year	76/100
Metacritic	75/100
Review scores
Source	Rating
AllMusic	4/5 stars
The A.V. Club	B+
Consequence of Sound	B
Drowned in Sound	8/10
The Line of Best Fit	7/10
Loud and Quiet	7/10
Louder Sound	4/5 stars
Metal Injection	8/10
Pitchfork	7.8/10.0
Rolling Stone	3/5 stars

I Have Fought Against It, but I Can't Any Longer was met with "generally favorable" reviews from critics. At Metacritic, which assigns a weighted average rating out of 100 to reviews from mainstream publications, this release received an average score of 75, based on 9 reviews. Aggregator Album of the Year gave the release a 76 out of 100 based on a critical consensus of 12 reviews.

Pitchfork included I Have Fought Against It, but I Can't Any Longer. on its list of 2018's best metal albums.

== Track listing ==
No.	Title	Length
1.	"The Last Form of Loving"	3:34
2.	"Can Carry No Weight"	4:30
3.	"Partly Alive"	4:22
4.	"The West Has Failed"	3:38
5.	"Nothing Stirs"	5:55
6.	"Off Script"	5:28
7.	"An Urn"	4:03
8.	"Blessed, Alone"	3:58
9.	"Sickly Heart of Sand"	5:35
10.	"Ten Times a Day, Every Day, a Stranger"	8:32
Total length:		49:35

== Personnel ==
I Have Fought Against It, but I Can't Any Longer. credits adapted from AllMusic.

The Body

- Lee Buford
- Chip King

Additional musicians

- Michael Berdan (Uniform) – vocals
- Ben Eberle (Sandworm) – vocals
- Laura Gulley (Amoebic Ensemble) – viola, violin
- Kristin Hayter (Lingua Ignota) – piano, vocals
- Jim Manchester – vocals
- Seth Manchester – drums, programming
- Ryan Seaton – saxophone
- Keith Souza – drums, keyboards
- Chrissy Wolpert (Assembly of Light Choir) – piano, vocals

Production

- Seth Manchester – engineering, production
- Keith Souza – engineering, production
- Paco Barba – layout
- Richard Rankin – artwork, photography
