= Kiss Me, Judas =

1998 novel by Will Christopher Baer

- First edition
- Author: Will Christopher Baer
- Language: English
- Publisher: Viking Press
- Publication date: October 1, 1998
- Publication place: United States
- Media type: Print (Hardcover, Paperback)
- Pages: 240 pp
- ISBN: 0-670-88175-9
- OCLC: 39024789
- Dewey Decimal: 813/.54 21
- LC Class: PS3552.A3323 K5 1998
- Followed by: Penny Dreadful

Kiss Me, Judas is a 1998 neo-noir novel by the American author Will Christopher Baer. The book was first published on October 1, 1998, through Viking Press and follows the character of Phineas Poe after he wakes up in a hotel bathtub full of ice to discover that somebody has removed one of his kidneys.

== Plot summary ==
During his first night out of a mental institution after suffering a nervous breakdown, Phineas Poe is picked up by a prostitute named Jude. She drugs him removes his kidney, and leaves him in a hotel bathtub full of ice with a note on the counter that reads, "If you want to live, call 9-1-1." Phineas, an ex-police officer who had recently been searching for information against the Denver Police Department's Internal Affairs Unit, later finds out that a bag of heroin replaced his kidney. While searching for his missing kidney, Phineas finds love in his attacker while he evades the angry Denver police and tries to unlock the secrets behind his wife's recent death.

== Reception ==
Critical reception for Kiss Me, Judas was mixed. Entertainment Weekly gave the book a "C+", writing that Baer's "scalpel-sharp noir style proves a mesmerizing lure, but it can't compensate for a hazy plot that veers from the nauseating (much gratuitous, ornately sadistic violence) to the nonsensical". The Chicago Tribune also gave a mixed review, recommending the book to "fans of James Ellroy's more elliptical writing" but writing that it took a while to get into the book's rhythm. Kirkus Reviews gave a more positive review, stating that "Baer will almost certainly write better books than this, but probably not with such youthful verve, bare nerve-ends, or frigidly droll, dead-on metaphors".
