= Uniform (band) =

American industrial metal band

- Origin: New York City, U.S.
- Genres: Industrial metal; noise rock; industrial rock
- Years active: 2013–present
- Labels: Beggars Tomb; Alter; Sacred Bones
- Members: Michael Berdan; Ben Greenberg; Mike Sharp; Michael Blume; Brad Truax
- Past members: Greg Fox
- Website: unifuckingform.com

Uniform is an American industrial metal and noise rock band, formed in 2013 in New York City by vocalist Michael Berdan and guitarist Ben Greenberg. The current lineup of the band also features Mike Sharp and Michael Blume on drums, and Brad Truax on bass.

== History ==
Greenberg previously played with The Men and Pygmy Shrews whereas Berdan sang for Drunkdriver and York Factory Complaint. The band came together after Greenberg and Berdan, who played in bands 3 years prior, started living on the same street. The duo recorded their eponymous 12" single, which was released in 2014. Their debut studio album, 2015's Perfect World, was issued on Alter Records. For the release of 2016's Ghosthouse EP, the band signed to Sacred Bones Records.

2017 saw the release of the band's second album, Wake in Fright. Following the tour with experimental metal band The Body, Berdan contributed to their 2018 album I Have Fought Against It, But I Can't Any Longer., and the bands released a collaborative record Mental Wounds Not Healing. The band also enlisted Liturgy and Zs drummer Greg Fox for its third studio album, 2018's The Long Walk. A second collaborative album with The Body, titled Everything That Dies Someday Comes Back, was issued in 2019. In January 2020, the band released the track "Awakening" as a part of the Adult Swim single series. In June 2020, the band announced their fourth album, Shame, and released its lead single "Delco". The second single from the album, "Dispatches From the Gutter," was released in July 2020 with an accompanying music video. Released on September 11, 2020, the record was mixed by Randall Dunn and features Mike Sharp on drums. In the same year, the band contributed the track "Catholic Town" to Jesse Draxler's compilation, Reigning Cement.

In June 2024, the band announced the release of their fifth studio album, American Standard, which will feature the extended line-up with the addition of touring drummer Michael Blume and bassist Brad Truax. The announcement was accompanied by the release of the lead single, "This Is Not a Prayer". The record will be supported by a North American summer tour.

== Musical style ==
Uniform's style has been described as industrial metal, noise rock, industrial rock and industrial punk. The band incorporates elements from industrial music, thrash metal and power electronics; according to Luca Cimarusti of Chicago Reader, the band "continually streamlined their sound, toying with Wax Trax! industrial, straightforward punk, and electronic synth swaths—sometimes all at once." Their second record,Wake in Fright, has brought together elements from EBM, hardcore and noise, while "leaning more heavily towards their hardcore and metal heritage" than their debut album, Perfect. AllMusic's Paul Simpson compared the record to "an overdriven version of Ministry's most thrash-influenced material, while likening Berdan's vocals to those of David Yow and "a severely electroshocked David Thomas." Pitchfork's Andy O'Connor has compared the "mangled, mid-paced guitar riffs" on The Long Walk to "Celtic Frost recorded through a series of budget amps and distortion pedals, then played at deafening volume."

The band's live setup features heavy use of drum machines, bass synthesizers and multiple guitar amplifiers; Berdan additionally works on electronic instruments such as synthesizers and sequencers while Greenberg handles drum programming, synthesizer parts and production. Perfect World was recorded with a single bass synthesizer and a drum machine; for its follow-up Wake in Fright, the band sought to "get a bigger sound" by the use of sampling and sequencing on Pro Tools. Samples of gunshots and explosions were also used to produce rhythm tracks. Introduction of on Greg Fox's live drums on The Long Walk necessitated pre-production and modifications on Greenberg's guitar rig; his modified rig enabled him to trigger the bass synthesizer while playing the guitar. Live drums on the follow-up record, Shame, were performed by Mike Sharp; the record featured "various shades of heavy, electronically charged rock," while incorporating elements from doom metal, black metal and thrash metal.

== Members ==
Current members

- Michael Berdan – vocals, electronics (2013—present)
- Ben Greenberg – guitar, bass, programming, electronics (2013—present)
- Mike Sharp – drums, electronics (2019—present)
- Michael Blume – drums
- Brad Truax – bass

Past members

- Greg Fox – drums, electronics (2017—2018)

Touring members

- Blaze Bateh – drums (2019)

== Discography ==
Studio albums

- Perfect World (2015)
- Wake in Fright (2017)
- The Long Walk (2018)
- Shame (2020)
- American Standard (2024)

Collaborative albums

- Mental Wounds Not Healing (2018; with The Body)
- Everything That Dies Someday Comes Back (2019; with The Body)
- Live at the End of the World (2020; live album with The Body)
- Bright New Disease (2023; with Boris)

EPs

- Ghosthouse (2016)
- Ghosthouse in the Nightmare City (2024)

Singles

- "Our Blood" / "Of Sound Mind and Body" (2014)
- "Ghosthouse" (2016)
- "Tabloid" (2016)
- "The Killing of America" (2017)
- "Come and See" (2018; with The Body)
- "The Walk" (2018)
- "Penance" (2019; with The Body)
- "Not Good Enough" (2019; with The Body)
- "Awakening" (2020)
- "Delco" (2020)
- "Dispatches From the Gutter" (2020)
- "Shame" (2020)
- "This Is Not a Prayer" (2024)

Music videos

- "Tabloid" (2016; dir. Jim Larson)
- "The Killing of America" (2017; dir. Yussef Cole)
- "The Walk" (2018; dir. Danny Perez)
- "Day of Atonement" (2019; dir. Alexander Barton; with The Body)
- "Dispatches From the Gutter" (2020; dir. Jacqueline Castel)
- "Life in Remission" (2020; dir. A.F. Cortes)
- "The Shadow of God's Hand" (2021; dir. John Bradburn)
