= Will Christopher Baer =

American author of hardboiled fiction

Will Christopher Baer is an American author of hardboiled fiction.

== Bibliography ==
=== Novels ===
- Kiss Me, Judas (1999)
- Penny Dreadful (2000)
- Hell's Half Acre (2004)
- Godspeed (TBD)

=== Collections ===
- Phineas Poe (2005), the trilogy consisting of Kiss Me, Judas, Penny Dreadful, and Hell's Half Acre
