= The Body (band) =

American sludge metal band

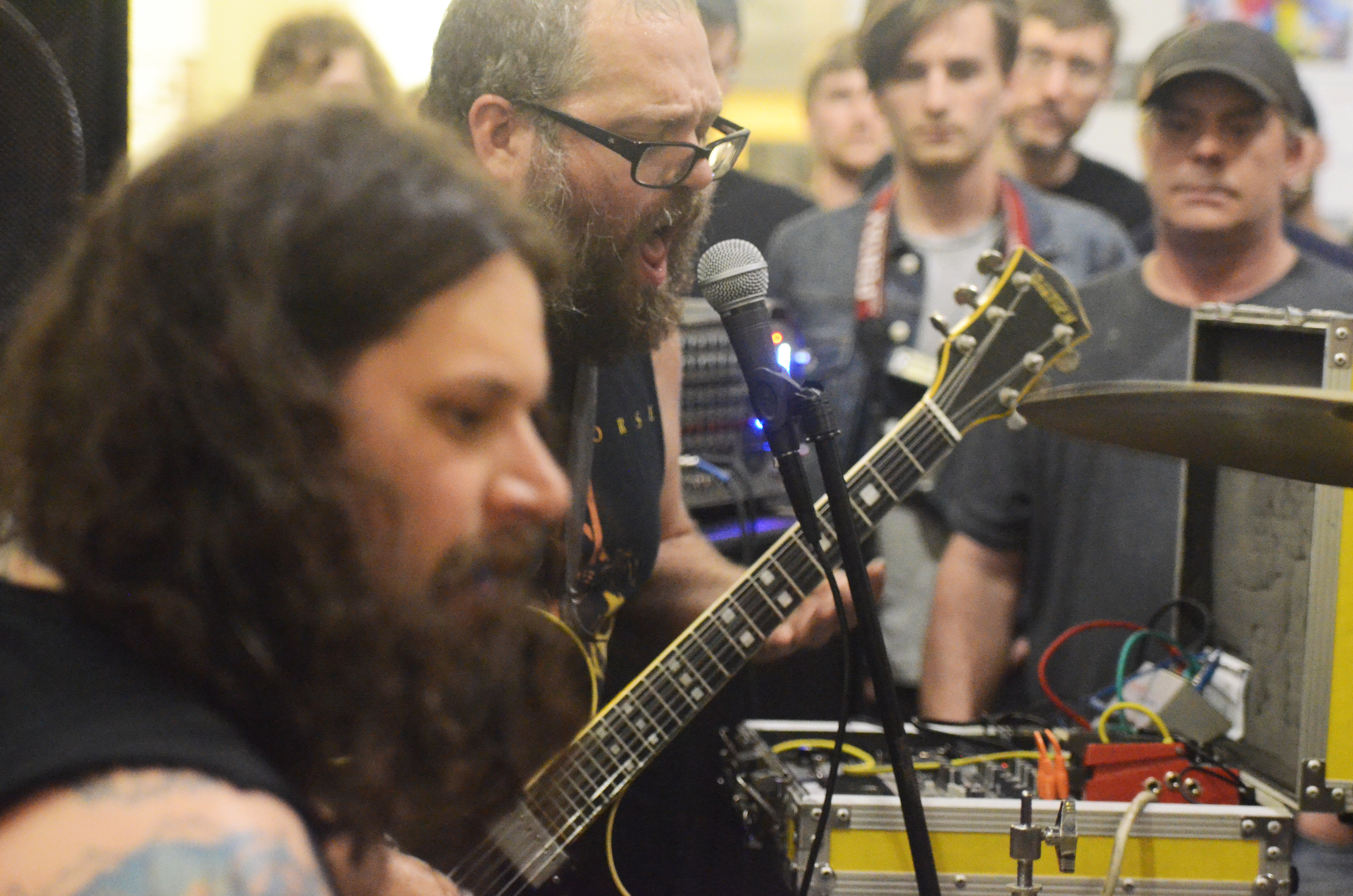
- The Body in 2015

Background information
- Origin: Providence, Rhode Island, U.S.
- Genres: Experimental metal; sludge metal; doom metal; noise; power electronics
- Years active: 1999–present
- Labels: At a Loss; Thrill Jockey; Sacred Bones; RVNG Intl.
- Members: Chip King; Lee Buford
- Website: thebody.bandcamp.com

The Body is an American experimental metal duo that was formed in 1999 in Providence, Rhode Island by guitarist/vocalist Chip King and drummer/programmer Lee Buford. As of 2025, they have released eight solo full-length albums as well as seventeen collaborative LPs, nine EP's, four splits, three compilations, two singles, and one collaborative live album.

== History ==
Drummer Lee Buford started the band with hometown friend Chip King after one year of school at the Museum School in Boston and moving to Manhattan in a four-month stint with Blue Man Group. They released their eponymous first full-length album in 2004. Six years of touring and small releases passed before they released their second full-length album, All the Waters of the Earth Turn to Blood, in collaboration with the Assembly of Light choir. This album was met with some critical acclaim. They followed this in 2011 with a full length collaboration with post-rock band Braveyoung, called Nothing Passes.

== Members ==
- Chip King – guitars, vocals
- Lee Buford – drums, programming, vocals

== Discography ==
Studio albums

- The Body (2004)
- All the Waters of the Earth Turn to Blood (2010)
- Christs, Redeemers (2013)
- I Shall Die Here (2014)
- No One Deserves Happiness (2016)
- I Have Fought Against It, but I Can't Any Longer. (2018)
- I've Seen All I Need to See (2021)
- The Crying Out of Things (2024)

Collaborative albums

- Nothing Passes (with Braveyoung) (2011)
- Released from Love (with Thou) (2014)
- You, Whom I Have Always Hated (with Thou) (2015)
- xoroAHbin (with Vampillia) (2015)
- The Body & Krieg (with Krieg) (2015)
- One Day You Will Ache Like I Ache (with Full of Hell) (2016)
- Ascending a Mountain of Heavy Light (with Full of Hell) (2017)
- Mental Wounds Not Healing (with Uniform) (2018)
- Whitehorse & The Body (with Whitehorse) (2019)
- Everyday, Things Are Getting Worse (with Thou) (2019)
- Everything That Dies Someday Comes Back (with Uniform) (2019)
- Live at the End of the World (live album with Uniform) (2020)
- I Don't Ever Want to Be Alone (with MSC) (2020)
- Leaving None but Small Birds (with BIG BRAVE) (2021)
- Enemy of Love (with OAA) (2022)
- Orchards of a Futile Heaven (with Dis Fig) (2024)
- Was I Good Enough? (with Intensive Care) (2025)
- Whole Wide World (with Cel Genesis) (2026)

EPs

- The Body Demo (2004)
- Cop Killer/Dead Cops (2005)
- Even the Saints Knew Their Hour of Failure and Loss (2006)
- 2008 Tour EP (2008)
- The Cold, Suffocating Dark Goes on Forever, and We Are Alone (2012)
- Master, We Perish (2013)
- The Tears of Job (2015)
- A Home on Earth (2017)
- O God Who Avenges, Shine Forth. Rise Up, Judge of the Earth; Pay Back to the Proud What They Deserve. (2018)

Splits

- Split 7" (with Get Killed) (2004)
- Split 7" (with Whitehorse) (2011)
- Split LP (with Sandworm) (2014)
- Split 7" (with Bummer) (2020)

Singles

- "To Know and to Hide" (2016)
- "Everybody Goes, as Far as They Can" (2017)
- "To Be Eviscerated" (2026)

Compilations

- Anthology (2011)
- Remixed (2019)
- I Shall Die Here / Earth Triumphant (2023)
