= Le ceneri di Heliodoro =

2019 studio album by Rome

Studio album by Rome
- Released: January 18, 2019
- Studio: Audio Oak; Heliopolis Studios
- Genre: Neofolk
- Length: 44:52
- Label: Trisol Music Group

Rome chronology
Hall of Thatch (2018)	Le ceneri di Heliodoro (2019)	The Lone Furrow (2020)

Singles from Le Ceneri Di Heliodoro
- 1. "Who Only Europe Know" Released: 2018

Professional ratings
Review scores
Source	Rating
Ondarock	7.5/10
House of Prog	83/100
Metal1.info	9/10
Side-Line Magazine	8.5/10
Scene Point Blank	8.5/10
TerraRelicta	9/10

Le ceneri di Heliodoro (Italian for 'The Ashes of Heliodorus') is the twelfth album by Luxembourgish neofolk band Rome, released on January 18, 2019 on Trisol Music Group.

== Track listing ==
No.	Title	Length
1.	"Sacra entrata"	4:35
2.	"A New Unfolding"	3:29
3.	"Who Only Europe Know"	3:39
4.	"The West Knows Best"	3:22
5.	"Feindberührung"	3:55
6.	"Fliegen wie Vögel"	4:45
7.	"One Lion's Roar"	3:30
8.	"Black Crane"	3:16
9.	"La Fin d'un monde"	0:57
10.	"The Legion of Rome"	3:04
11.	"Uropia o morte"	3:45
12.	"Desinvolture"	6:30
Total length:		44:52
