= The Lone Furrow =

2020 studio album by Rome

Studio album by Rome
- Released: 28 August 2020
- Genre: Neofolk
- Length: 43:52
- Language: English, French, German
- Label: Trisol Music Group

Rome chronology
Gärten und Strassen (2020)	The Lone Furrow (2020)	Parlez-Vous Hate? (2021)

Singles from The Lone Furrow
- 1. "Ächtung, Baby!"; 2. "Kali Yuga Über Alles"

The Lone Furrow is the 16th studio album by the Luxembourgish music act Rome, released on 28 August 2020 by Trisol Music Group. It is in the neofolk genre and addresses themes of spiritual decay, with influence from writers such as Rudyard Kipling, Friedrich Nietzsche and George Orwell. The album features several guest vocalists from heavy metal bands and critics have said it may appeal to heavy metal fans. Critics said it was a return to the style of Rome's early records, which they described as "martial", while keeping some elements from the more recent albums.

== Music and lyrics ==
The press release for The Lone Furrow says the album is targeted against the "despiritualized modern age" and promotes a cultural heritage present in Hermann Hesse, Friedrich Nietzsche, Tacitus, George Orwell, Ovid, the Prose Edda, W. B. Yeats and Charles Baudelaire. It says the aim is to convince listeners that the world is larger than any idea about it and to reject easy answers.

The song title "Ächtung, Baby!" is a reference to the 1991 album Achtung Baby by U2, where the added umlaut changes the meaning to "Ostracism, Baby!" The song features Alan Averill from the band Primordial as a guest vocalist. Adam Darski from the band Behemoth appears on "The Angry Cup" with an incantation in Polish. Other guest appearances from singers include Joseph D. Rowland of Pallbearer and J.J. of Harakiri for the Sky. "The Twain" is inspired by the writings of Rudyard Kipling. "Kali Yuga Über Alles" refers to the Kali Yuga, an age of spiritual decline in Hinduism; the track features Aki Cederberg, author of the book Journeys in the Kali Yuga: A Pilgrimage from Esoteric India to Pagan Europe, which is about a search for spiritual connections between ancient Indian and European cultures. The song's lyrics are partially inspired by Ovid and the title is an ironic reference to "California über alles" by Dead Kennedys. "The Weight of Light" takes inspiration from Nietzsche and "The Lay of Ira" from Old Norse literature. The French-language "Palmyra" is about the archaeological site of Palmyra and the threats against its pagan artefacts. "Obsidian" is a German-language tribute to the writer and soldier Ernst Jünger.

== Release ==
"Ächtung, Baby!" was released as a single on 29 May 2020 with "Any Other Grey" as its B-side. "Kali Yuga Über Alles" was also released as a single. Trisol Music Group released The Lone Furrow on 28 August 2020. It was Rome's 16th studio album in 15 years of existence.

== Reception ==
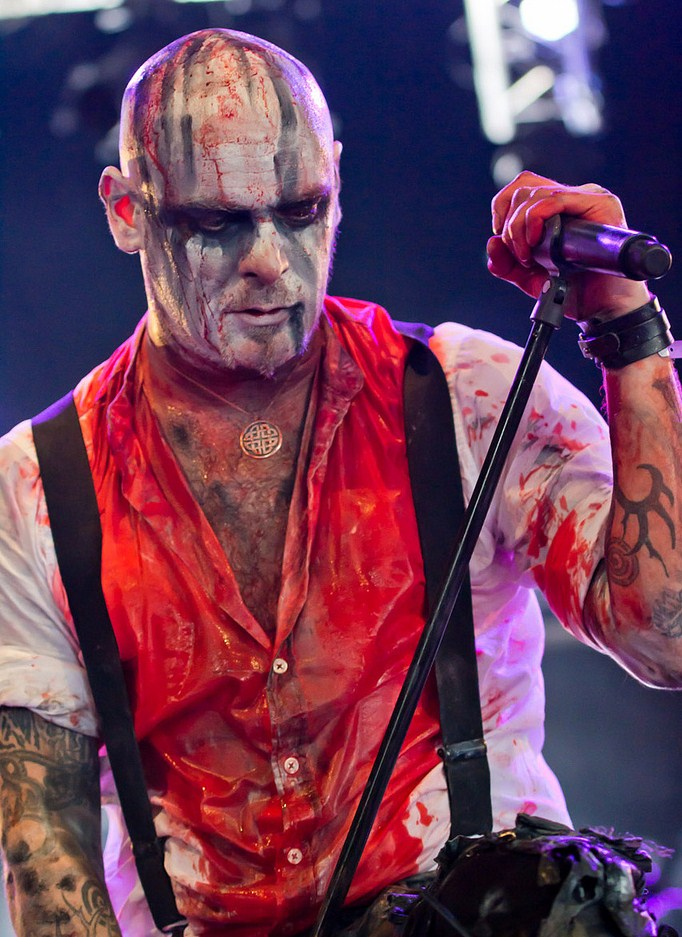
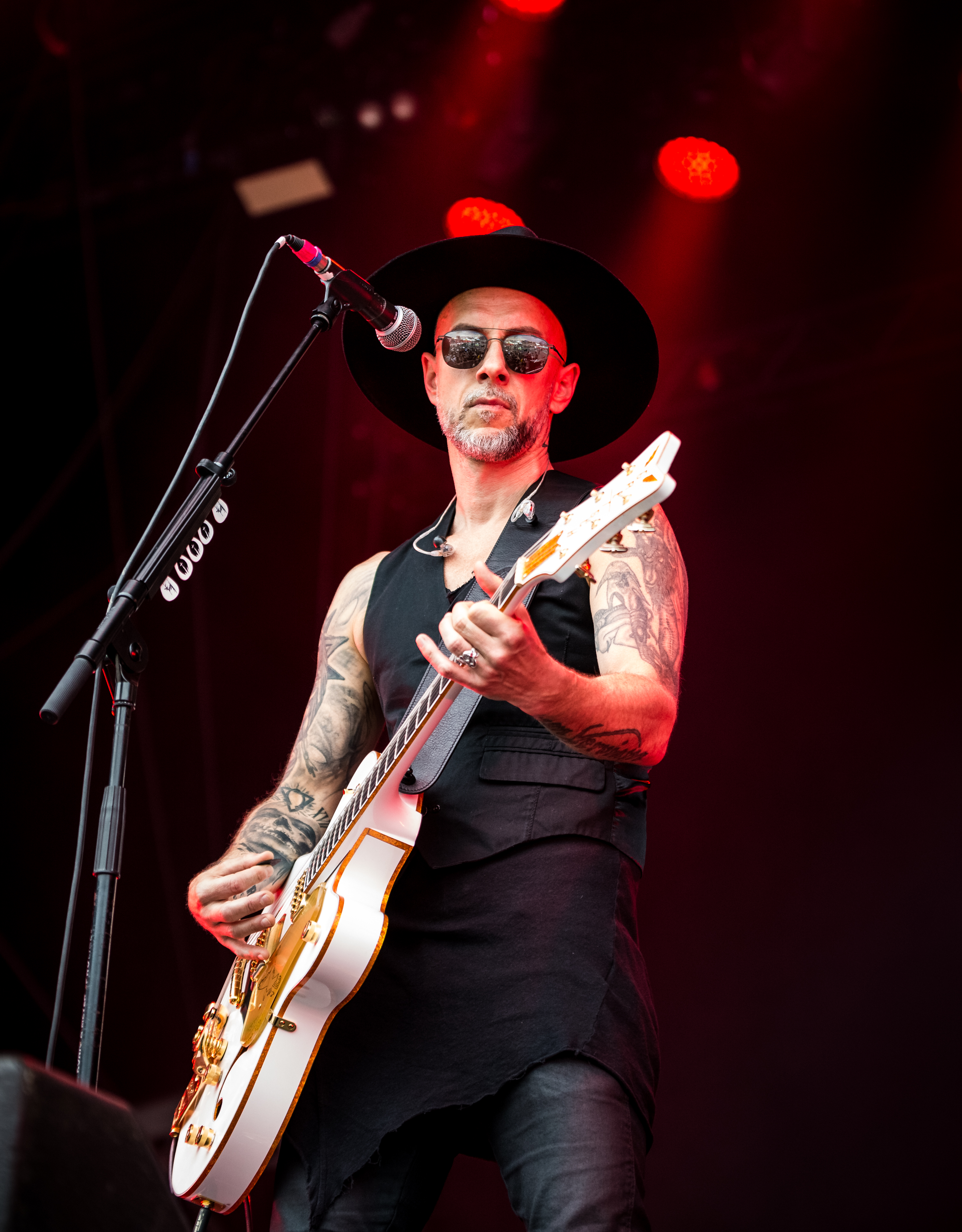
The heavy metal singers Alan Averill and Adam Darski appear as guest vocalists.

Dom Lawson of Blabbermouth.net and Stefan Wolfsbrunn of Metal.de highlighted the prominent presence of guest singers from the heavy metal genre. They wrote that The Lone Furrow should resonate with heavy metal listeners both for the guest appearances and, according to Lawson, because the album has a dark intensity similar to much heavy metal music. Wolfsbrunn wrote that Rome is one of the most important bands in the neofolk genre, which is pinpointed by The Lone Furrow, and said he hoped the album would transcend genre boundaries.

Marco De Baptistis of Ondarock and Wolfsbrunn wrote that The Lone Furrow sees Rome return to its musical roots of "martial" neofolk. De Baptistis said "On Albion's Plan" is an exception, because of its similarities to the folk music of The Dublin Session (2019), but otherwise, The Lone Furrow is reminiscent of Rome's first three albums, released by Cold Meat Industry. At the same time, it differs from them due to the guest appearances and how Rome works more with suggestions. Wolfsbrunn wrote that The Lone Furrow differs musically from Rome's two previous albums, The Dublin Session and Le Ceneri di Heliodoro (2019), but it retains the latter's political discourse about progress and globalisation, and has similar provocative elements. De Baptistis highlighted the rejection of progress delivered by Cederberg and the album's dystopian visions, which include quotations from Orwell. Oliviër Bernard of Obsküre described a dramaturgy throughout the album which combines the motifs of spiritual decay and rage with the belief that beauty can save humanity. He wrote that the use of several languages may play into this theme, displaying a "real union of nations", although the album does not offer any clear answers. Claudia Zinn-Zinnenburg of Orkus wrote that the opening track's questioning of modern society runs as a red thread, allowing the album to be both critical and open-minded. Although engaging in Weltschmerz, Zinn-Zinnenburg wrote, the message is rebellious rather than mournful, and detached from time and space rather than stuck in the past.

Lawson praised The Lone Furrow's musical formula of drums, synthesizers, acoustic instruments, reverb and Reuter's baritone voice, and said the latter's songwriting abilities have matured, highlighting "Tyriat Sig Tyrias" and "Ächtung, Baby!" He described the album as a highpoint in Rome's career and a good entry point for new listeners. Wolfsbrunn highlighted "The Angry Cup", "Kali Yuga Über Alles" and "Obsidian", writing that the album has its own mood and spirit, which he regards as the mark of an exceptional album. De Baptistis said "Kali Yuga Über Alles" and "Ächtung, Baby!" will be among the most prominent songs in Rome's discography. Bernard said "The Twain" is the album's best track whereas "Making Enemies in the New Age" is "a little flat". Orkus selected The Lone Furrow as its album of the week. Zinn-Zinnenburg said it invites repeated listening and called it "a profound masterpiece".

== Track listing ==
All tracks are written by Jérôme Reuter.

No.	Title	Length
1.	"Masters of the Earth" (featuring Aki Cederberg)	2:45
2.	"Tyriat Sig Tyrias"	2:58
3.	"Ächtung, Baby!" (featuring Alan Averill)	3:58
4.	"Making Enemies in the New Age" (Joseph D. Rowland)	1:00
5.	"The Angry Cup" (featuring Adam Darski)	4:00
6.	"The Twain"	4:00
7.	"Kali Yuga Über Alles" (featuring Cederberg)	4:38
8.	"The Weight of Light"	2:22
9.	"The Lay of Iria" (featuring J.J.)	4:14
10.	"On Albion's Plain"	3:37
11.	"Palmyra" (featuring Laure Le Prunenec)	6:01
12.	"Obsidian"	3:02
13.	"A Peak of One's Own"	1:17
Total length:		43:52

== See also ==
- "The Ballad of East and West"
