= Sorrow and Extinction =

Studio album by Pallbearer
- Released: February 21, 2012
- Recorded: 2010–2011
- Genre: Doom metal
- Length: 48:48
- Labels: Profound Lore; 20 Buck Spin

Pallbearer chronology
Sorrow and Extinction (2012)	Foundations of Burden (2014)

Sorrow and Extinction is the debut studio album by the American doom metal band Pallbearer. It was released on February 21, 2012 via Profound Lore Records, and on August 31, 2012 via 20 Buck Spin with alternate vinyl mastering.

== Critical reception ==
Professional ratings
Review scores
Source	Rating
AllMusic	3.5/5 stars
The Austin Chronicle	3/5 stars
Blabbermouth.net	8/10
Pitchfork	8.4/10
Spectrum Culture	4.25/5
Spin	8/10

The album was met with generally favourable reviews from music critics. Pitchfork ranked it No. 1 of its 'Top 40 Metal Albums of 2012' list.

Accolades for Sorrow and Extinction
Publication	Accolade	Rank	Ref.
Beats per Minute	The Top 50 Albums of 2012	24	
Exclaim!	Exclaim!'s Best Albums of 2012: Top 50 Albums of the Year	47	
Pitchfork	The Top 50 Albums of 2012	47	

== Track listing ==
No.	Title	Writer(s)	Length
1.	"Foreigner"	Brett Campbell; Joseph D. Rowland	12:20
2.	"Devoid of Redemption"	Campbell	8:16
3.	"The Legend"	Campbell	8:46
4.	"An Offering of Grief"	Campbell	8:31
5.	"Given to the Grave"	Campbell; Rowland	10:55
Total length:			48:48

== Personnel ==
- Pallbearer – mixing
  - Brett Campbell – vocals, guitar
  - Devin Holt – guitar
  - Joseph Rowland – bass
  - Zach Stine – drums
- Chuck Schaaf – engineering, mixing
- Dan Lowndes – mastering
- Sean Reynolds Williams – artwork
- Greg Wilkinson – alternate mastering
