= The Hyperion Machine =

2016 studio album by Rome

Studio album by Rome
- Released: 12 August 2016
- Studio: Ear We Go Studio, Belgium
- Genre: Neofolk
- Length: 47:16
- Language: English
- Label: Trisol Music Group

Rome chronology
Coriolan (2016)	The Hyperion Machine (2016)	Hall of Thatch (2018)

The Hyperion Machine is the tenth studio album by the Luxembourgish music act Rome, released on 12 August 2016 by Trisol Music Group.

== Release ==
Trisol Music Group released The Hyperion Machine on 12 August 2016. It was Rome's tenth studio album in ten years.

== Reception ==
Laut.de's Toni Hennig said The Hyperion Machine breaks with Rome's last few records by not being a historically themed concept album, but it addresses some of the same subjects. These include the treatment of Jews and political opponents by Nazi Germany in the songs "The Secret Germany (For Paul Celan)", which references Paul Celan's "Todesfuge", and "Die Mörder Mühsams", which is about the anarchist Erich Mühsam. Marco De Baptistis of Ondarock described the historical and literary references—which include Louis-Ferdinand Céline and the novel Hyperion by Friedrich Hölderlin—as romantic, ghostly and hallucinatory.

Hennig described the album as musically divided in two halves, where the first has simple arrangements and the second is "more exciting" and uses ambient techniques. The Swedish newspaper Dagens Nyheter brought up the collaboration with Thåström, who appears as a guest vocalist on the song "Stillwell" and has his song "FanFanFan" covered by Rome as a bonus track. The critic said the neofolk on The Hyperion Machine has some similarities to Thåström's music, as well as to Leonard Cohen, Nick Cave and the "late industrial blues" of Einstürzende Neubauten. Sara Berg of Nöjesguiden described the album as "americana folk, post-rock, polished growl and dystopian melodies"; unfortunately, according to Berg, it has a "martyr-solemn sound" which makes it seem self-pitying. De Baptistis wrote that the album combines Rome's later influences from Jacques Brel and Léo Ferré with the martial industrial elements of the band's early releases. He said The Hyperion Machine is more varied than Rome's previous records and that the guest appearance from Thåström turned out successful, hoping to see more collaboration between him and Rome. Hennig said the melodies, rhythms and mood alone make the album worth listening to, but the lyrics add another depth and make it a Gesamtkunstwerk.

== Track listing ==
All tracks are written by Jérôme Reuter, except where noted.

No.	Title	Length
1.	"The Hyperion Machine"	0:24
2.	"Celine in Jerusalem"	4:41
3.	"Transference"	4:26
4.	"The Alabanda Breviary"	3:21
5.	"Stillwell" (featuring Thåström)	5:04
6.	"Cities of Asylum"	4:35
7.	"Skirmishes for Diotima"	4:42
8.	"Adamas"	6:32
9.	"The Secret Germany (For Paul Celan)"	4:09
10.	"Die Mörder Mühsams"	4:28
11.	"FanFanFan" (Thåström cover; bonus track)	4:54
Total length:		47:16
