= Forgotten Days =

Studio album by Pallbearer
- Released: October 23, 2020
- Genre: Doom metal
- Length: 52:58
- Label: Nuclear Blast
- Producer: Randall Dunn

Pallbearer chronology
Heartless (2017)	Forgotten Days (2020)	Mind Burns Alive (2024)

Forgotten Days is the fourth studio album by the American doom metal band Pallbearer. It was released on October 23, 2020, through Nuclear Blast, making it the band's first full-length for the label. Production was handled by Randall Dunn.

== Critical reception ==
Professional ratings
Aggregate scores
Source	Rating
AnyDecentMusic?	7.3/10
Metacritic	84/100
Review scores
Source	Rating
AllMusic	4/5 stars
Classic Rock	4/5 stars
Consequence of Sound	A
Exclaim!	6/10
Kerrang!	4/5
Metal Hammer	4.5/5 stars
Pitchfork	8/10
Spectrum Culture	(75%)

Forgotten Days was met with universal acclaim from music critics. At Metacritic, which assigns a normalized rating out of 100 to reviews from mainstream publications, the album received an average score of 84 based on eight reviews. The aggregator AnyDecentMusic? has the critical consensus of the album at a 7.3 out of 10, based on seven reviews.

Jon Hadusek of Consequence of Sound praised the album, stating that it "is arguably the best doom metal album of 2020 and an impressive label debut. Thanks to Dunn's minimalist production, the album is a sonic pleasure, and it's instantly more listenable and accessible than Heartless. AllMusic's Thom Jurek wrote, "Forgotten Days is the album that will likely unite all Pallbearer fans. Its return-to-roots aesthetic is planted in a physical base that carries the band's dark, progressive doom into a new era". Hannah May Kilroy of Kerrang! wrote, "There's nothing too out there on Forgotten Days – the '80s synth of the closing "Caledonia" probably the biggest surprise, but a welcome one: a playful take on the pain of the past – and all the tracks are solid, with any experimentation woven tightly around Pallbearer's doom roots. This is the sound of a genre being refreshed, and of a band making it entirely their own". Dave Everley of Classic Rock magazine wrote, "Their fourth album takes yet more detours, but without ever losing sight of the path. Devotees of lead-heavy riffs will be spoilt by the title track and "Rites Of Passage", and the pace never exceeds sluggish". Grayson Haver Currin of Pitchfork wrote, "These eight songs grapple candidly with [family loss], but, like the music itself, the words don't wallow. Instead, Pallbearer use these tragedies to revel in being alive, or to answer the 'gnawing doubts that I ever learned to live'". Jake Cole of Spectrum Culture summarized, "offering up the most focused, heaviest record since their debut, Pallbearer further cement themselves as one of modern doom's luminaries". In a mixed review, Trystan MacDonald of Exclaim! said, "Gone are the crushing riffs and transitions, replaced with subdued progressions. It's a real blight on much of the record, unable to keep the listener enthralled or interested".

=== Year-end lists ===
Publications' year-end list appearances for Forgotten Days
Critic/Publication	List	Rank	Ref
Consequence of Sound	Top 50 Albums of 2020	26	
Decibel	Top 40 Albums of 2020	19	
Metal Hammer	The 50 Best Metal Albums of 2020	14	
PopMatters	Top 10 Progressive Rock/Metal Albums of 2020	5	

== Track listing ==
All music is composed by Brett Campbell, Devin Holt, Joseph D. Rowland and Mark Lierly.

No.	Title	Lyrics	Length
1.	"Forgotten Days"	Brett Campbell	6:29
2.	"Riverbed"	Joseph D. Rowland	6:24
3.	"Stasis"	Campbell	4:00
4.	"Silver Wings"	Campbell	12:18
5.	"The Quicksand of Existing"	Rowland	3:59
6.	"Vengeance & Ruination"	Campbell	6:53
7.	"Rite of Passage"	Rowland	4:55
8.	"Caledonia"	Rowland	8:00
Total length:			52:58

== Personnel ==
- Brett Campbell – vocals, lyrics (tracks: 1, 3, 4, 6), guitar, piano, synthesizer
- Devin Holt – backing vocals, guitar
- Joseph D. Rowland – vocals, lyrics (tracks: 2, 5, 7, 8), bass, synthesizer, guitar, baritone guitar
- Mark Lierly – drums, percussion
- Randall Dunn – producer, mixing
- Justin Morris – engineering
- Matt Colton – mastering
- Rob Kimura – design, layout
- Michael Lierly – paintings

== Charts ==
Chart (2020)	Peak position
UK Rock & Metal Albums (OCC)	14
UK Independent Albums (OCC)	29
US Current Album Sales (Billboard)	28
US Top Hard Rock Albums (Billboard)	12
US Top Album Sales (Billboard)	34
