= Heartless (album) =

Studio album by Pallbearer
- Released: March 24, 2017
- Genre: Doom metal
- Length: 59:59
- Label: Profound Lore
- Producer: Pallbearer

Pallbearer chronology
Foundations of Burden (2014)	Heartless (2017)	Forgotten Days (2020)

Heartless is the third studio album by the American doom metal band Pallbearer. It was released on March 24, 2017 through Profound Lore Records.

A music video was made for the track "I Saw the End".

== Critical reception ==
Professional ratings
Aggregate scores
Source	Rating
AnyDecentMusic?	7.9/10
Metacritic	82/100
Review scores
Source	Rating
The 405	9/10
AllMusic	4/5 stars
The A.V. Club	B+
Consequence of Sound	B+
Exclaim!	8/10
Kerrang!	KKKKK
Metal Hammer	4/5 stars
MetalSucks	4.5/5 stars
Pitchfork	6.0/10
PopMatters	9/10 stars

Heartless was met with critical acclaim. The album received an average score of 82/100 from 13 reviews on Metacritic, indicating "universal acclaim". AllMusic writer Thom Jurek praised the album for being a maturation of Pallbearer's sound, saying that it manages to not forsake the band's origins while still breaking new ground. Writing for Exclaim!, Trystan MacDonald said, "Heartless continues to build on the band's reputation as one of the biggest acts in doom metal." In a more mediocre review, Pitchfork contributor Andy O'Connor wrote, "The deep cauldron of metal, prog, and doom influences have so far been a key to Pallbearer's greatness, but their third record fails to piece it all together. They have run up against their limits." PopMatters writer Tanner Smith was very positive on Heartless, calling it a sign that Pallbearer will go down as one of the best metal acts of the decade.

=== Accolades ===
Year	Publication	Country	Accolade	Rank	Ref.
2017	Consequence of Sound	United States	"Top 50 Albums of 2017"	18	
2017	Decibel	United States	"Top 40 Albums of 2017"	3	
2017	Loudwire	United States	"25 Best Metal Albums of 2017"	5	
2017	Metal Hammer	United Kingdom	"100 Best Metal Albums of 2017"	13	
2017	PopMatters	United States	"The Best Metal of 2017"	2	
2017	The Quietus	United Kingdom	"The Best Metal Albums of 2017"	1	
2017	Rolling Stone	United States	"20 Best Metal Albums of 2017"	6	
2017	Stereogum	United States	"The 50 Best Albums of 2017"	25	

== Track listing ==
All songs written and composed by Pallbearer.

No.	Title	Length
1.	"I Saw the End"	6:21
2.	"Thorns"	5:24
3.	"Lie of Survival"	8:25
4.	"Dancing in Madness"	11:47
5.	"Cruel Road"	7:13
6.	"Heartless"	8:09
7.	"A Plea for Understanding"	12:40
Total length:		59:59

Japan exclusive bonus disc (Fear and Fury 2016 EP)
No.	Title	Length
1.	"Fear & Fury"	5:52
2.	"Over & Over" (Black Sabbath cover)	6:08
3.	"Love You to Death" (Type O Negative cover)	7:23
Total length:		19:23

== Personnel ==
Pallbearer

- Brett Campbell – guitar, vocals, synthesizers
- Mark Lierly – percussion
- Joseph D. Rowland – bass, backing vocals, synthesizers
- Devin Holt – guitar, backing vocals

Additional personnel

- Jason Weinheimer – engineering
- Zach Reeves – engineering
- Joe Barresi – mixing
- Dave Collins – mastering
- Michael Lierly – artwork

== Charts ==
Chart (2017)	Peak position
Belgian Albums (Ultratop Flanders)	89
German Albums (Offizielle Top 100)	98
US Billboard 200	187
