= Parlez-Vous Hate? =

Studio album by Rome
- Released: January 29, 2021
- Genre: Neofolk
- Length: 41:28
- Label: Trisol Music Group

Rome chronology
The Lone Furrow (2020)	Parlez-Vous Hate? (2021)

Singles from Parlez-Vous Hate?
- 1. "Panzerschokolade" Released: December 31, 2020; 2. "Parlez-Vous Hate?" Released: January 21, 2021; 3. "Feral Agents (Feat. King Dude)" Released: April 30, 2021

Parlez-Vous Hate? is the fourteenth album by Luxembourgish neofolk project Rome. It was released on January 29, 2021, on Trisol Music Group.

== Background ==
Parlez-Vous Hate? was released shortly after Rome's previous album, The Lone Furrow. Project leader Jérôme Reuter wrote that he was able to release this album so quickly because of the free time due to the COVID-19 pandemic cancelling his live performances, giving him more free time to spend in the studio.

Two singles from the album were released on YouTube prior to the album release: "Panzerschokolade", on December 31, 2020, and "Parlez-Vous Hate?", on January 21, 2021.

== Critical reception ==
Professional ratings
Review scores
Source	Rating
Ave Noctum	7/10
Crossfire Metal	10/10
Dark Entries	6/10 stars
House of Prog	82/100
Metal1.info	8.5/10
Metalitalia.com	7.5/10
MonkeyPress	8.5/10
Ondarock	7.5/10
RockHard Slovenia	85%
Side-Line Magazine	9½/10

Parlez-Vous Hate? was largely well received by critics. It received favourable write-ups in publications such as Amboss-Mag, Antyradio, PlanetMosh, VerdamMnis Magazine, and Ver Sacrum.

== Track listing ==
No.	Title	Length
1.	"Shangri-Fa"	0:22
2.	"Parlez-vous Hate?"	3:30
3.	"Born in the E.U."	3:38
4.	"Death from above"	3:18
5.	"Panzerschokolade"	4:03
6.	"Der Adler trägt kein Lied"	3:57
7.	"Toll in the great Death"	3:10
8.	"Feral Agents"	4:06
9.	"You owe me a whole World"	3:19
10.	"Blood for All"	3:35
11.	"Alesia"	3:41
12.	"Fort Nera, Eumesville"	4:45
