= Foundations of Burden =

Studio album by Pallbearer
- Released: August 19, 2014
- Recorded: February−March 2014
- Studio: Type Foundry Studios (Portland, OR)
- Genre: Doom metal
- Length: 54:54
- Label: Profound Lore
- Producer: Billy Anderson

Pallbearer chronology
Sorrow and Extinction (2012)	Foundations of Burden (2014)	Heartless (2017)

Foundations of Burden is the second studio album by the American doom metal band Pallbearer. It was released on August 19, 2014, via Profound Lore Records. Recording sessions took place at Type Foundry Studios in Portland from February to March 2014. Production was handled by Billy Anderson.

The album debuted at number 90 on the Billboard 200, number 10 on the Top Hard Rock Albums and number 14 on the Independent Albums charts in the United States and number 19 on the Official Independent Album Breakers Chart in the United Kingdom.

== Critical reception ==
Professional ratings
Aggregate scores
Source	Rating
AnyDecentMusic?	8.2/10
Metacritic	88/100
Review scores
Source	Rating
AllMusic	4/5 stars
The A.V. Club	A
Exclaim!	9/10
The Line of Best Fit	8/10
MusicOMH	4/5 stars
Now	5/5 stars
Paste	8.2/10
Pitchfork	8.6/10
PopMatters	7/10
Tiny Mix Tapes	3/5 stars

Foundations of Burden was met with universal acclaim from music critics. At Metacritic, which assigns a normalized rating out of 100 to reviews from mainstream publications, the album received an average score of 88 based on sixteen reviews. The aggregator AnyDecentMusic? has the critical consensus of the album at an 8.2 out of 10, based on eleven reviews.

John Semley of Now praised the album, calling it "a master class in School of Iommi doom metal". Jason Heller of The A.V. Club also praised the album, writing "it's quite simply moving, the sounds of dislocated souls finding a voice at last". Natalie Zina Walschots of Exclaim! called it "an effort that is even more emotionally ambitious an undertaking, and all the more wounding for its beauty". Brandon Stosuy of Pitchfork resumed: "as obsessed as Pallbearer is with endings, the music here is timeless". Michael Madden of Paste claimed: "even though the album is crushing, the band's penchant for melody is what elevates Foundations of Burden above otherwise comparable records from this year". AllMusic's Thom Jurek found "the album and its production make catharsis part of an evolutionary process, not an end in itself". Sam Shepherd of musicOMH noted the album "showcases the development in the band's songwriting skills". Steve Lampiris of The Line of Best Fit called it a "fantastic sophomore effort". Sean McCarthy of PopMatters wrote: "if there are any faults on Foundations of Burden, it's that the middle portion of the album tends to succumb to a sameness sound, which is almost inevitable when you have two 10-minute plus tracks back to back. Fortunately, the demand for subsequent listens is hardly a laborious task, given Brett Campbell's stellar, sustained vocal delivery".

In mixed reviews, Tiny Mix Tapes writer concluded: "Foundations of Burden is special, there's little question of that, but the precocious virtuosity of the performance doesn't change the fact that the material is far from challenging".

== Track listing ==
No.	Title	Length
1.	"Worlds Apart"	10:16
2.	"Foundations"	8:41
3.	"Watcher in the Dark"	10:40
4.	"The Ghost I Used to Be"	10:17
5.	"Ashes"	3:19
6.	"Vanished"	11:41
Total length:		54:54

== Personnel ==
- Brett Campbell – lead vocals, guitar
- Devin Holt – vocals (tracks: 1, 3), guitar
- Joseph D. Rowland – vocals (tracks: 1, 4, 5), bass guitar, Rhodes piano, analog synthesizer
- Mark Lierly – drums
- Billy Anderson – producer, recording, mixing, engineering
- Rohan Sforcina – engineering assistant
- Justin Weis – mastering
- Erin Pierce – photography
- Diana Lee Zadlo – photography
- Chimere Noire – layout

== Charts ==
Chart (2014)	Peak position
US Billboard 200	90
US Top Hard Rock Albums (Billboard)	10
US Independent Albums (Billboard)	14
