= Mind Burns Alive =

Studio album by Pallbearer
- Released: May 17, 2024
- Recorded: 2023
- Studios: Fellowship Hall Sound, Idlewild Audio, Audio MQ Headquarters, and Metropolis Music
- Genre: Doom metal
- Length: 50:58
- Label: Nuclear Blast
- Producer: Pallbearer

Pallbearer chronology
Forgotten Days (2020)	Mind Burns Alive (2024)

Singles from Mind Burns Alive
- 1. "Where the Light Fades" Released: March 20, 2024

Mind Burns Alive is the fifth studio album by the American doom metal band Pallbearer, released on May 17, 2024, through Nuclear Blast. The record was produced by the band and primarily recorded by Zach Reeves and Jason Weinheimer at Fellowship Hall Sound in Little Rock, AR, with additional recording by Joseph D. Rowland at the band's newly constructed studio Idlewild Audio, as well as by Devin Holt and Brett Campbell in their respective home studios.

== Background ==
On May 22, 2022, the band announced via Instagram that they were back in the studio to record their fifth album at Fellowship Hall Studios, posting an image of drummer Mark Lierly with the comment: "After seemingly endless obstacles, we are equally thrilled and relieved to announce that tracking has begun for our next record."

When the band announced the album on March 20, 2024, and its first single, "Where The Light Fades", vocalist and guitarist Brett Campbell told Speakeasy PR: "These songs are a deeper exploration of dynamics and sonic color than anything we have done up to this point. I'm of the belief that true heaviness comes from emotional weight, and sometimes sheer bludgeoning isn't the right approach to getting a feeling across." In the same interview, bassist and co-vocalist Joseph D. Rowland remarked: "It's ironic given that the album is largely centered around isolation, but it felt like it summoned us into being back together again in one town, after so long apart."

Nearly a week after the announcement, Brett Campbell sat down for an interview with Nick Ruskell of Kerrang!, noting that the album title, which is the title of the second song, "encapsulated the overall themes of mental unease and people being unwell." He further added: "What's strange is, Joe (Joseph D. Rowland) and I wrote our material and wrote about the subject matter completely independent of one another. When we started showing each other the songs we were like, 'This could be a themed collection of short stories,' because they're all dealing with neuroses, or depression, or isolation, or manic breakdown delusions, or getting caught by dangerous ideas that lead you down that path."

== Music videos ==
To support the release of Mind Burns Alive, a series of three distinct music videos were created.

The first video, "Where the Light Fades", was released on March 20, 2024. It features vignettes of each band member being revealed and obscured by a consistently fading light. A motif borrowed from videos like Sinéad O'Connor's "Nothing Compares 2 U" is evident, where Brett is isolated against a black background, directly engaging the viewer with a heartfelt vocal performance is also prominent.

The second video, "Endless Place", was released on April 24, 2024. This video showcases the band performing in a vast, empty theater located in the Deep South. The location, a historic masonic temple, embodies the "Endless Place" mentioned in the song's lyrics with its tomb-like atmosphere and winding hallways. The video is finished in stark black and white, further removing any sense of time and place.

The third and final video for the album's title track, "Mind Burns Alive", was released on May 17, 2024. This video presents the band in an abstract visual motif, with bold mixes of orange and blue color schemes. The character in the song is depicted suffering from mania, proposing grand gestures to reach a former lover. Techniques such as slow shutter speed and fisheye lens were used to visually represent the protagonist's declining mental faculties. This video was also a direct collaboration between the band and Dan Almasy, the director of the two previous videos.

== Reception ==
Professional ratings
Review scores
Source	Rating
Blabbermouth.net	9/10
Distorted Sound	10/10
Kerrang!	4/5 stars
Metal Hammer	4/5 stars
Metal Injection	8.5
MetalSucks	4/5 stars
Sonic Perspectives	8.6

Mind Burns Alive has been well received by music critics. Blabbermouth.net contributor Dom Lawson call the album the band's "most radical to date", emphasizing that they "have learned that silence is the most powerful noise of all, and their mastery of the space between the excruciatingly quiet and the punishingly loud is total." Similarly, Distorted Sound writer Phil Cooper noted that "the use of sparseness within the songwriting helps to elevate the moments when the wall of sound joins together to deliver the soaring melodies," adding that "the heartfelt delivery of the lyrics advances the striking emotional levels of the music."

More analytically, Alex Deller of Metal Hammer wrote that the band has "not done away with the crunch entirely, but quiet restraint is now the name of the game, and those thumps to the back of the head are tempered by prog, synths, sax and slowcore." And as Jordan Blum of Sonic Perspectives proclaims, "it's impossible to refute that Mind Burns Alive is a logical and wholly satisfying successor to Forgotten Days."

== Track listing ==
All music is composed by Brett Campbell, Devin Holt, Joseph D. Rowland, and Mark Lierly, with the addition of Norman Williamson on "Endless Place".

Mind Burns Alive track listing
No.	Title	Lyrics	Length
1.	"Where the Light Fades"	Brett Campbell	6:40
2.	"Mind Burns Alive"	Joseph D. Rowland	7:57
3.	"Signals"	Campbell	7:53
4.	"Endless Place"	Campbell & Rowland	10:38
5.	"Daybreak"	Rowland	7:11
6.	"With Disease"	Campbell	10:37
Total length:			50:58

== Personnel ==
Pallbearer

- Brett Campbell – vocals, electric guitar, synthesizer, production
- Devin Holt – backing vocals, guitar, production
- Joseph D. Rowland – vocals, bass guitar, synthesizer, production
- Mark Lierly – drums, percussion

Additional contributors

- Norman Williamson – saxophone
- Zach Reeves and Jason Weinheimer – recording, audio engineering
- Mario Quintero – mixing
- Matt Colton – mastering
- Simon Henderson – design, layout
- Bill Armstrong – cover photography
- Dan Almasy – music videos director + press/pr photography

== Charts ==
Chart performance for Mind Burns Alive
Chart (2024)	Peak position
UK Album Downloads (Official Charts)	46
UK Independent Albums (Official Charts)	29
UK Rock & Metal Albums (Official Charts)	8
