= Rome (band) =

Luxembourgish band

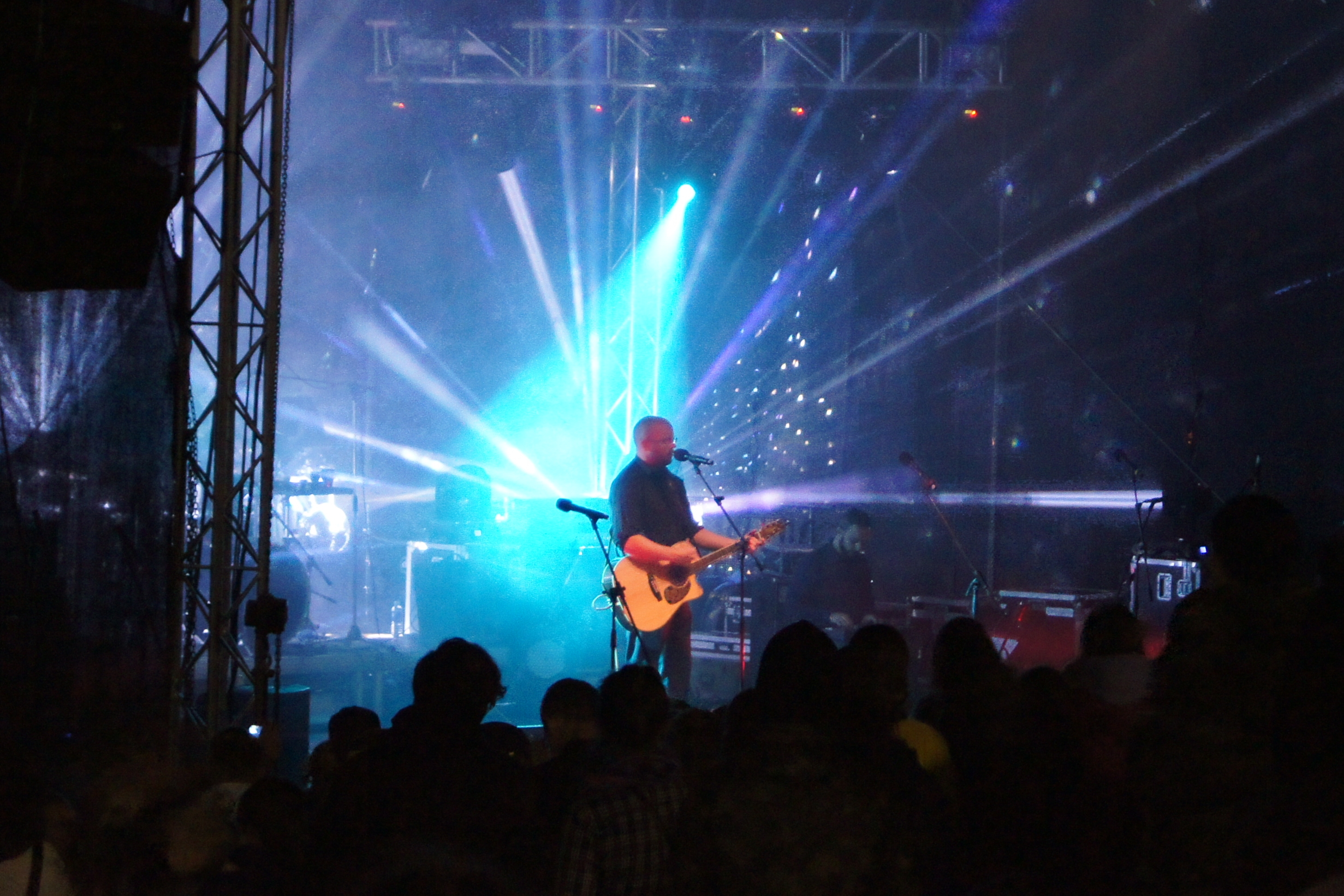
- Rome performing at the festival Mėnuo Juodaragis in 2013

Background information
- Origin: Luxembourg
- Genres: Neofolk, martial industrial
- Years active: 2005–present
- Labels: Trisol, CMI
- Members: Jérôme Reuter
- Past members: Patrick Damiani; Nikos Mavridis

Rome is a Luxembourgish neofolk band founded in November 2005 as a main output for the songs of Jérôme Reuter (born August 2, 1981) of Luxembourg. Though Reuter is the main creative force in the band, he performs live with a range of musicians who also contribute performances on various studio recordings. In early 2006 Rome was signed to the Swedish record label Cold Meat Industry. Rome has since signed with the Trisol Music Group record label as of 2009. Rome is considered one of the most important acts within the neofolk genre.

== Background ==
Reuter previously recorded music under the name Reggie Fain, which was influenced by Tom Waits. He was also a member of an Oi! band called the Skinflicks, and a post-punk band called Mack Murphy and the Inmates, where he performed under the name Mack Murphy.

Reuter's first recording as Rome was the EP Berlin, which was recorded in Patrick Damiani's studio in Germany in December 2005. Damiani, a sound engineer, has been considered a full-time member of Rome since 2008. In 2009, violinist Nikos Mavridis joined the group, although he left after being conscripted into the Greek military.

Rome has had live performances featuring Die Weisse Rose on drums.

== Musical style ==
According to Paul Simpson, the band's sound combines "military drumming and horns with atmospheric electronic textures and ethereal acoustic guitars, as well as samples and poetic lyrics often relating to war-related themes, as well as more universal topics such as love, pain, and death." Many of his albums have historical themes, such as Flowers From Exile and A Passage to Rhodesia, which focus on the Spanish and Rhodesian Civil Wars, respectively. Reuter has cited Jacques Brel, Léo Ferré, Albert Camus, Ernst Jünger, and Jean Genet as influences on his music and lyrics.

== Discography ==
=== Albums ===
- Berlin (2005)
- Nera (2006)
- Confessions d'un voleur d'âmes (2007)
- Masse Mensch Material (2008)
- Flowers from Exile (2009)
- Nos Chants perdus (2010)
- Die Æsthetik der Herrschaftsfreiheit (2011)
- Hell Money (2012)
- A Passage to Rhodesia (2014)
- Coriolan (2016)
- The Hyperion Machine (2016)
- Hall of Thatch (2018)
- Le ceneri di Heliodoro (2019)
- The Dublin Session (2019)
- The Lone Furrow (2020)
- Parlez-Vous Hate? (2021)
- Hegemonikon (2022)
- Gates of Europe (2023)
- The Dublin Session II (2025)
- Civitas Solis (2025)
- Flowers from Exile — Revisited (2025)
- The Tower (2025)
- The Hierophant (2025)

=== Extended plays ===
- Defiance (2022)
- World in Flames (2024)

=== Live albums ===
- Hansa Studios Session (2017)
- Hansa Studios Session II (2021)
- Live in Kyiv (2023)
