= Pallbearer (band) =

American doom metal band

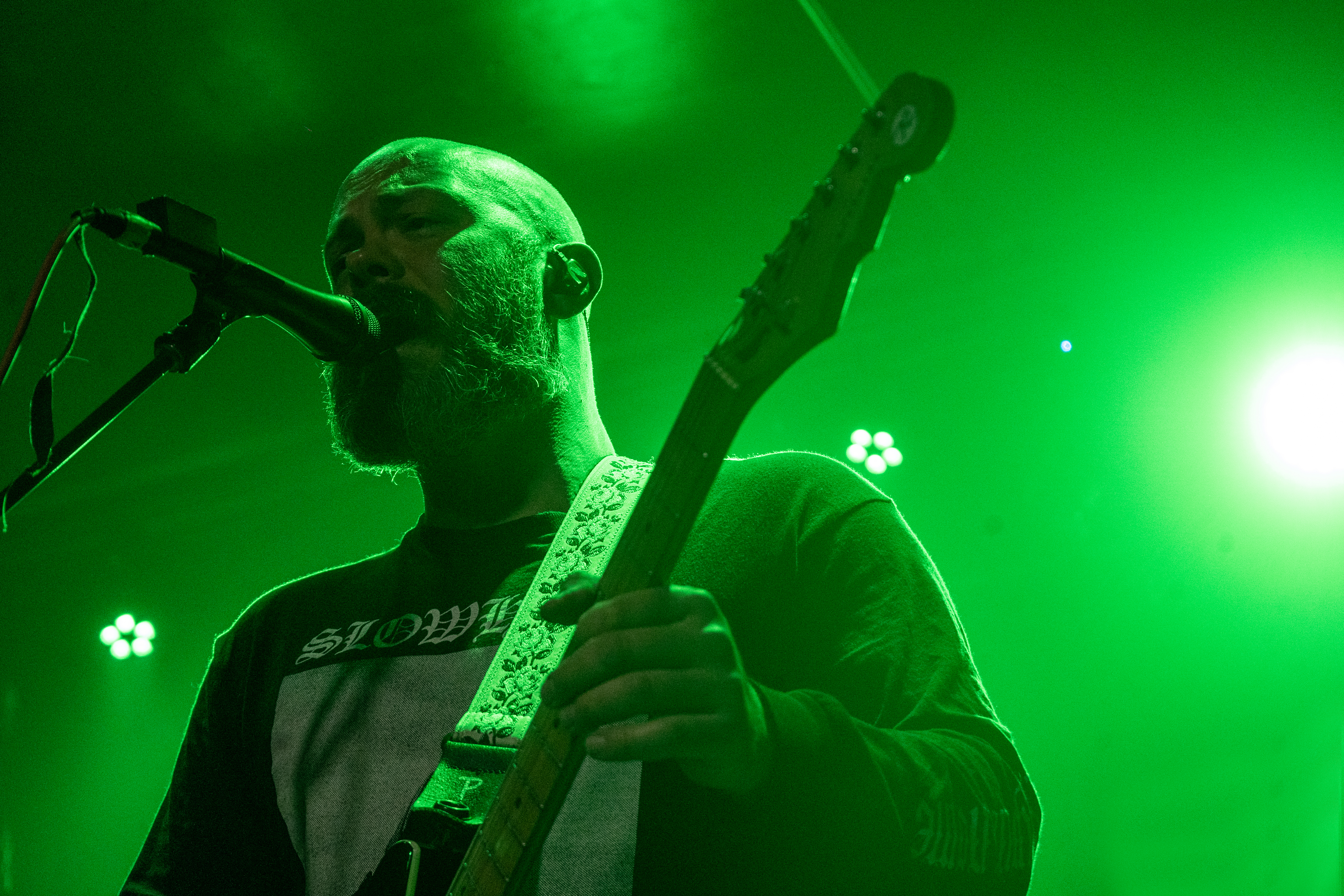
- Brett Campbell of Pallbearer - 2-21-26 - Performing at The Regency Live in Springfield Missouri

Background information
- Origin: Little Rock, Arkansas, U.S.
- Genre: Doom metal
- Years active: 2008–present
- Labels: Profound Lore, Nuclear Blast
- Members: Brett Campbell; Devin Holt; Joseph D. Rowland; Mark Lierly
- Past members: David Dobbs; Zach Stine; Chuck Schaaf
- Website: pallbearerdoom.com

Pallbearer is an American doom metal band from Little Rock, Arkansas, formed in 2008. While initially rooted in a fairly traditional sound at their beginning, their music is noted for expanding into progressive rock and alternative rock territories as their career has continued.

== History ==
Pallbearer was formed in 2008 in Little Rock, Arkansas by Brett Campbell and Joseph D. Rowland. The two met as students at the University of Central Arkansas and were previously in an experimental project, called SPORTS. After adding Devin Holt on second guitar and drummer David Dobbs, who was shortly thereafter replaced by Zach Stine, Pallbearer recorded and self-released a three-song demo in 2010. The group was signed by Profound Lore Records in 2011. Pallbearer's first full length Sorrow and Extinction was released in 2012, earning immediate critical success. Sorrow and Extinction was awarded Best New Music status by Pitchfork and was cited amongst the best albums of the year by Spin and NPR.

The line up was solidified by the addition of Mark Lierly (drums) after the recording of the debut LP. Pallbearer's 2014 album, Foundations of Burden was recorded and produced by Billy Anderson at Type Foundry Studio in Portland, Oregon. The album was awarded Best New Music status by Pitchfork. The album topped Decibel magazine's Album of the Year list.

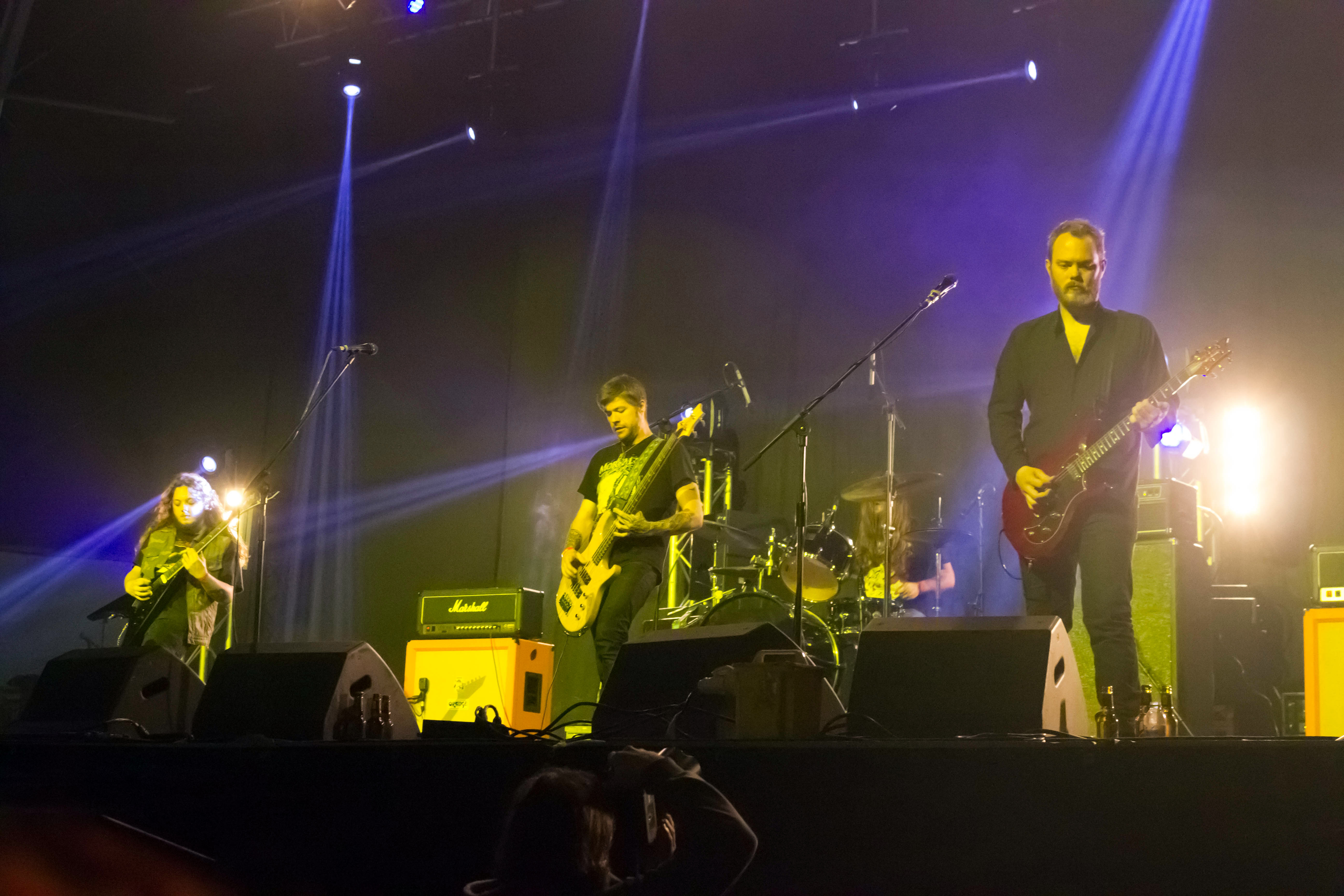
Pallbearer performing in 2015

In the summer of 2016, the band returned to Little Rock to record their third full-length, Heartless, at Fellowship Hall Sound studios. The mix was done by Joe Barresi. The official video for the opening track, "I Saw the End," was released in March 2017, along with the album. Heartless debuted at #187 on the Billboard Top 200 Album chart in the U.S. and #42 on the Billboard Top Current Albums chart. It ranks on Stereogum's 50 Best Albums of 2017 So Far. Heartless marked the band moving away from their traditional metal and doom roots, with the album demonstrating grunge, classic rock, and prog influences such as The Smashing Pumpkins, Camel, Pink Floyd, Kansas, and Brian Eno. PopMatters, in reviewing the album, wrote "Pallbearer reaches universality previously hit by artists like the Beatles on Abbey Road or Pink Floyd at their most explorative."

In October 2017, the band was featured in The New York Times Magazine in an essay by cultural critic David Rees. Acknowledging the band's expanding appeal and sonic horizons, Rees described Pallbearer as "one of the most resonant emotional campaigns in American rock music." They were awarded the 2017 Metal Hammer Golden God award for Best Underground Band. Thrillist also named Pallbearer the best band from Arkansas in their Best Bands From Every State rankings. Their fourth album, Forgotten Days, was released in October 2020 and was described by Consequence of Sound as "Perhaps the best doom metal album of 2020".

On 20 March 2024, the band released a new song titled "Where the Light Fades" and announced their fifth album, Mind Burns Alive, which was released on 17 May with high acclaim from music critics.

The band is scheduled to perform at Milwaukee Metal Fest in June 2026.

== Band members ==
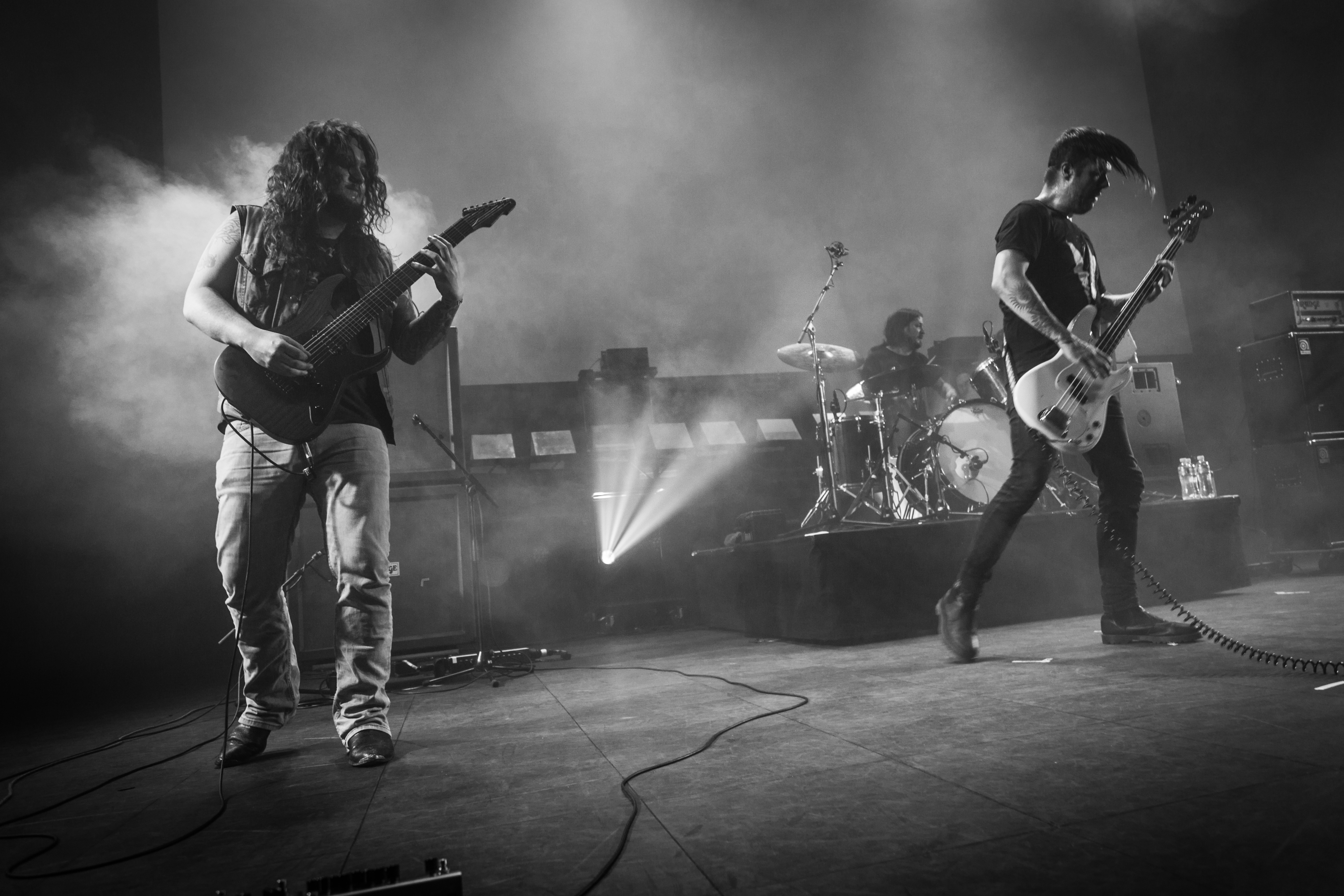
Pallbearer performing in 2017

Current

- Brett Campbell – lead vocals, guitar, synthesizer (2008–present)
- Joseph D. Rowland – bass, lead and backing vocals, electric and acoustic piano, synthesizer (2008–present)
- Devin Holt – guitar, backing vocals (2008–present)
- Mark Lierly – drums (2012–present)

Former

- David Dobbs – drums (2009)
- Zach Stine – drums (2009–2011)
- Chuck Schaaf – drums (2011-2012)

Timeline

== Discography ==
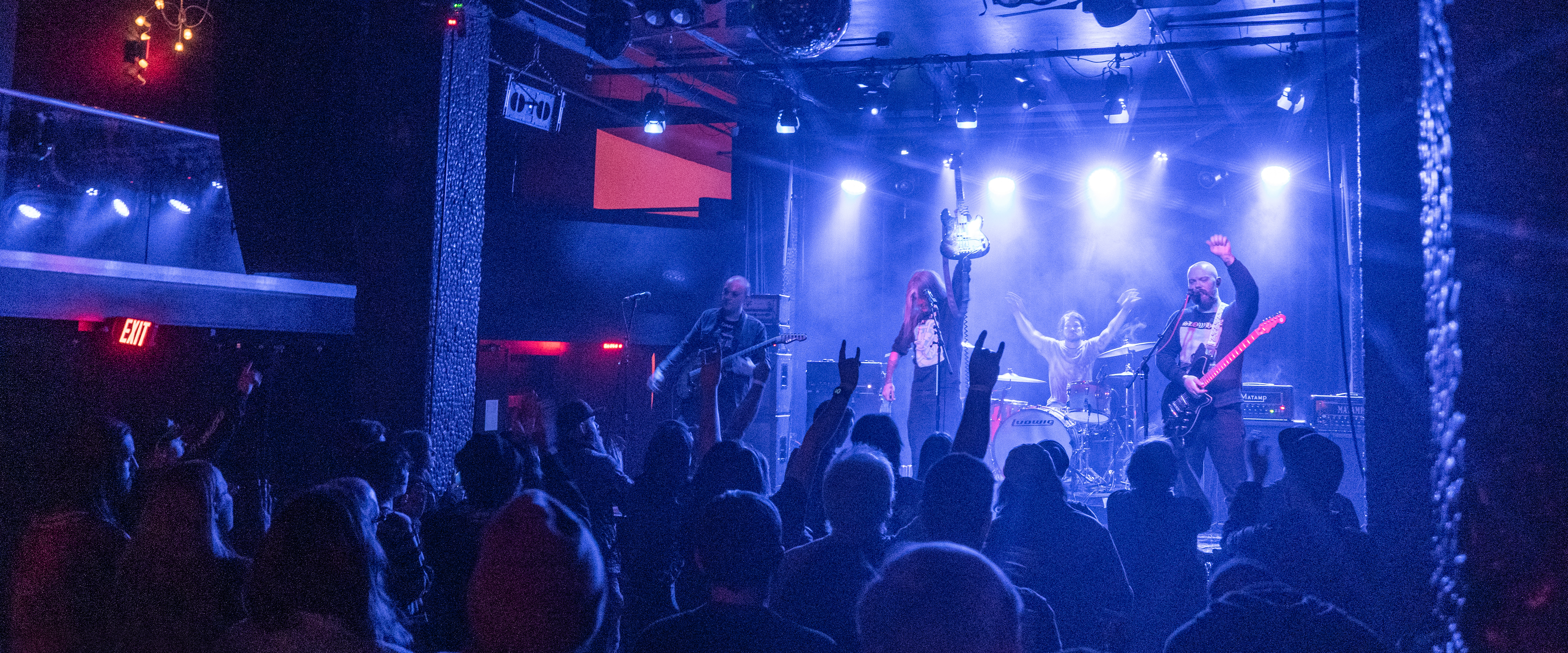
Pallbearer - 2-21-26 - Performing at The Regency Live in Springfield Missouri

=== Studio albums ===
- Sorrow and Extinction (2012)
- Foundations of Burden (2014)
- Heartless (2017)
- Forgotten Days (2020)
- Mind Burns Alive (2024)

=== EPs ===
- 2010 Demo (2010)
- Fear and Fury (2016)

=== Live ===
- Pallbearer Live (2012)
- Live at JJ's (2025)
- Live at Reggies (2025)

=== Singles ===
- "Fear and Fury" (2015)
- "Dropout" (2018)
- "Atlantis" (2019)
- "Endless Place" (2024)
