= Aki Cederberg =

Finnish writer, musician and filmmaker

Aki Cederberg (born in 1978) is a Finnish writer, musician, and filmmaker. He has written books about Indian religions and European modern paganism, including Journeys in the Kali Yuga (2017) and Holy Europe (Finnish ed. Pyhä Eurooppa 2020, English ed. 2024). He is also chief editor of Porvoon Kipinä, a periodical focusing on spiritual traditions, history, art and culture. Cederberg conducts seasonal ceremonies and rites of passage in accordance with Finnic and northern tradition.

== Early life ==
Aki Cederberg was born in Helsinki, Finland in 1978. He has a bachelor's degree in culture and arts. Interested in spiritual matters from an early age, he explored Western esotericism before moving into European modern paganism, which he defines as having a mythopoetic view of the world. A formative experience in his youth was living in England as part of a heathen brotherhood, with which he experienced both the positive aspects of paganism as well as its limitations, which he saw as those arising from the lack of living lines of spiritual tradition and authority.

Cederberg wanted to connect to a living tradition and travelled to India to seek gurus and explore Indian religious traditions. His first trip to India lasted for three months and he returned to the country several times during the next ten years. He received an initiation by a Naga Sadhu of the Juna Akhara and was given the name Adinath Puri. He also took part in the 2010 Kumbh Mela in Haridwar. After having explored the Indian esoteric world, Cederberg came to re-embrace the native, pagan traditions of Europe.

In his subsequent explorations of paganism, Cederberg has sought to transcend the tribal and national, and looked for commonalities between the various European pantheons and traditions. According to him, paganism can be defined by a several factors: a special bond with locality, local nature and the genius loci or spirit of a place, and an understanding of certain places as thresholds to the spirit world; an understanding of the ancestral chain that a person is part of, as well as a heightened sense of mortality; a cyclical conception of time, expressed through celebrations of the seasons; the importance of heritage and lore, including the oral traditions of mythic songs and spells, initiatory knowledge, symbolism and spiritual culture; as well as an intimate relationship with the divine maintained through action on a mythic level, i.e. rites and ceremonies.

== Writing career ==
Cederberg has written for The Fenris Wolf, a series of anthologies from Edda Publishing. Experiences he had in Asia form the basis for his books Pyhiinvaellus. Matkalla Intiassa ja Nepalissa (lit. 'Pilgrimage. Travelling in India and Nepal') from 2013 and Journeys in the Kali Yuga: A Pilgrimage from Esoteric India to Pagan Europe, published in 2017. At the end of the latter book, Cederberg rejects universalism and spiritual exoticism and argues for Westerners to approach spirituality through the gods of their native traditions, in Cederberg's case paganism from the Nordic countries. Publishers Weekly called Journeys in the Kali Yuga a "visceral, evocative memoir" where the author acts as "neither guide nor guru, allowing readers to truly participate in his journey without worrying about what exactly they are supposed to learn".

Cederberg's next book, Pyhä Eurooppa (lit. 'Holy Europe'), was published in 2020 and is a travelogue about places in Europe with a reputation of being holy. Cederberg uses this to argue that humans need a sense of sanctity and significance in life, which he contrasts with materialism and exploitation. The book discusses how European cultural and spiritual heritage has become associated with nationalist and far-right politics, something Cederberg renounces. A. W. Yrjänä of Helsingin Sanomat called the book "weirdly refreshing" because of its rejection of irony and direct call for spirituality. Ville Hytönen of Turun Sanomat highlighted and complimented the book's argument about a human need to connect to previous generations, which both capitalism and the Soviet Union have been unable to fulfill.

In 2023, Cederberg co-edited an anthology in memory of the musician and journalist Perttu Häkkinen (1979–2018).

== Other work ==
Cederberg has been active as a musician and filmmaker. He has been a member of various music groups and made the film Taiwaskivi (2009) with the audiovisual group Halo Manash. He has worked as an assistant director on several Finnish feature films and made a making-of documentary about the film Christmas Story (2007).

In 2021, Cederberg launched the cultural magazine Porvoon Kipinä (lit. 'Spark of Porvoo') with himself as editor-in-chief. The magazine is published by Salakirjat with three yearly issues. It has a special focus on spiritual and esoteric dimensions of culture and people associated with Porvoo.

== Selected publications ==
- Pyhiinvaellus. Matkalla Intiassa ja Nepalissa, Salakirjat 2013
- Journeys in the Kali Yuga: A Pilgrimage from Esoteric India to Pagan Europe, Inner Traditions – Bear & Company 2017
- Pyhä Eurooppa, Basam Books 2020
- Perttu Häkkinen – Valonkantaja, co-editor with Boris Brander, Vesa Iitti and Jussi K. Niemelä, Salakirjat 2023
- Holy Europe, Arcana Europa, 2024
- Tuonilmaiset – Porvoon Kipinä IV, Salakirjat, 2025
