= Xiu Xiu discography =

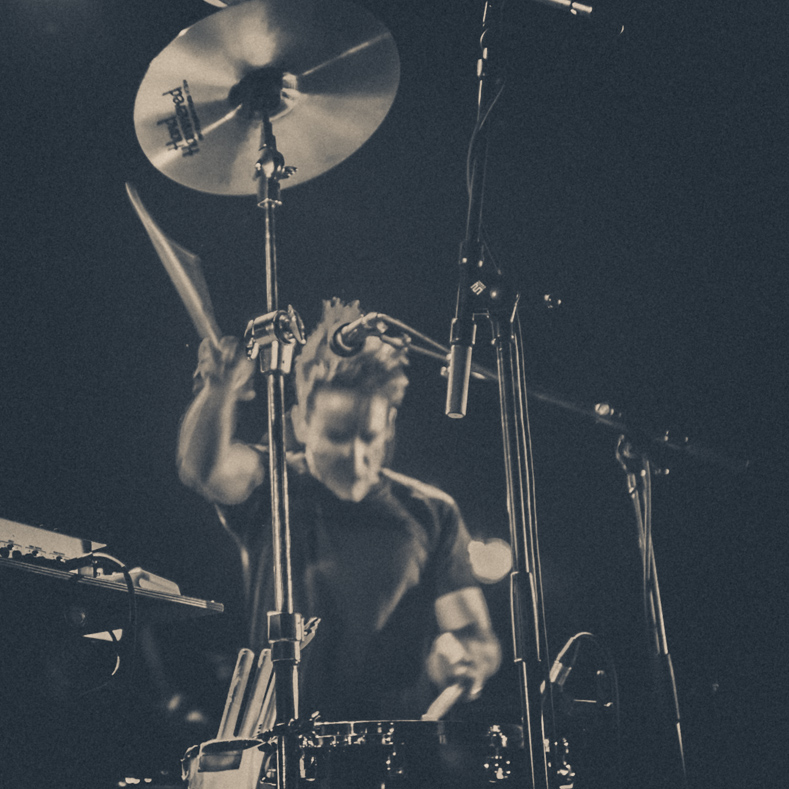
- Studio albums: 16
- Extended plays: 5
- Live albums: 1
- Compilation albums: 5
- Singles: 11

This is a selective list of American experimental band Xiu Xiu's discography.

== Albums ==
=== Studio albums ===
List of studio albums, with selected details and chart positions.
Title	Album details	Peak chart positions		
Title	Album details	US Heat.	US Vinyl	US Indep.
Knife Play	Released: February 19, 2002; Label: 5 Rue Christine, Kill Rock Stars; Format: CD, LP, cassette, digital download	—	—	—
A Promise	Released: February 18, 2003; Label: 5 Rue Christine; Format: CD, LP, cassette, digital download	—	—	—
Fabulous Muscles	Released: February 17, 2004; Label: 5 Rue Christine; Format: CD, LP, digital download	—	—	—
La Forêt	Released: July 12, 2005; Label: 5 Rue Christine; Format: CD, LP, digital download	—	—	—
The Air Force	Released: September 15, 2006; Label: 5 Rue Christine; Format: CD, LP, digital download	—	—	—
Women as Lovers	Released: January 29, 2008; Label: Kill Rock Stars; Format: CD, LP, cassette, digital download	45	—	—
Dear God, I Hate Myself	Released: February 23, 2010; Label: Kill Rock Stars; Format: CD, LP, digital download	—	—	—
Always	Released: February 28, 2012; Label: Polyvinyl, Bella Union; Format: CD, LP, digital download	—	10	—
Nina	Released: December 3, 2013; Label: Graveface; Format: CD, LP, cassette, digital download	—	—	—
Angel Guts: Red Classroom	Released: February 4, 2014; Label: Polyvinyl, Bella Union; Format: CD, LP, cassette, digital download	38	—	—
Unclouded Sky	Released: June 13, 2014; Label: Polyvinyl; Format: CD, digital download	—	—	—
Xiu Xiu Plays the Music of Twin Peaks	Released: April 16, 2016; Label: Polyvinyl, Bella Union; Format: CD, LP, cassette, digital download	9	8	—
Forget	Released: February 24, 2017; Label: Polyvinyl; Format: CD, LP, cassette, digital download	—	24	—
Girl with Basket of Fruit	Released: February 8, 2019; Label: Polyvinyl; Format: CD, LP, cassette, digital download	19	—	47
Oh No	Released: March 26, 2021; Label: Polyvinyl; Format: CD, LP, digital download	—	—	—
Ignore Grief	Released: March 3, 2023; Label: Polyvinyl; Format: CD, LP, digital download	—	—	—
13" Frank Beltrame Italian Stiletto with Bison Horn Grips	Released: September 27, 2024; Label: Polyvinyl; Format: CD, LP, digital download	—	—	—
Xiu Mutha Fuckin' Xiu: Vol. 1	Released: January 16, 2026; Label: Polyvinyl; Format: CD, LP, digital download	—	—	—
Eraserhead Xiu Xiu	Released: July 10, 2026; Label: Polyvinyl; Format: CD, LP, digital download	—	—	—

=== Live albums ===
- Life and Live (2005)

=== Compilation albums ===
- Fag Patrol (2003)
- Xiu Xiu for Life: The First 5 Years (2008) – Japanese best-of compilation
- Rare (2012) – Always companion compilation
- There Is No Right, There Is No Wrong (2014) – best-of compilation
- Xiu Mutha Fuckin' Xiu: Vol. 1 (2026) – compilation of covers voted by XMFX subscribers

== EPs ==
- Chapel of the Chimes (2002)
- Tu mi piaci (2006)
- Grumpus Krampus (2022)
- Ignore Grief Remixes (2023)
- Tired of Your World Newfoundland (2026)

== Singles ==
- "Fleshettes" CD-single (2004)
- The Special 12 Singles Series (2005)
- "Boy Soprano" / "San Pedro Glue Stick" picture disc 7-inch (2006)
- Jamie Stewart Pre-Xiu Xiu Picture disc 7-inch (2007)
- Untitled 12 month/12 disc subscription service – limited edition of 50 subscriptions (2009)
- "Razor Scooter" / "Sashay Away" digital single (2011)
- "Daphny" / "Only Girl (In the World)" 7-inch (2011)
- Graveface Records Charity 7-inch (2012)
- "Quagga" / "Thylacine" 7-inch (2012)
- "Fear of the Horizon" / "Turkish March" 7-inch art by Heidi Hahn (2017)
- "Between the Breaths" with Mitski (2018)
- "A Real Indication" digital single (2021)
- "Brand New Bitch"/"Enola Gay" 7-inch & bonus tracks for "Xiu Mutha Fuckin' Xiu Vol. 1" (2026)

=== Splits ===
- The Jim Yoshii Pile-Up & Xiu Xiu Split EP (Insound Tour Supports Series #26 (2003)
- This Song Is a Mess But So Am I & Xiu Xiu – 7-inch (2004)
- Bunkbed & Xiu Xiu – 7-inch (2004)
- Devendra Banhart & Xiu Xiu – 7-inch (2005)
- Kill Me Tomorrow & Xiu Xiu – 7-inch (2005)
- The Paper Chase & Xiu Xiu – 7-inch (2005)
- The Dead Science & Xiu Xiu – 7-inch (2005)
- WS-Burn & Xiu Xiu – 7-inch (2007)
- High Places & Xiu Xiu – 7-inch (2008)
- Parenthetical Girls (Morrissey/The Smiths covers, Upset the Rhythm (2009)
- Almost Xiu Xiu, Almost Deerhoof – 7-inch (2011)
- Chad VanGaalen & Xiu Xiu – The Green Corridor II 12-inch (2012)
- Dirty Beaches & Xiu Xiu – 7-inch (2012)
- Always "I Luv Abortion" / "Joeys Song" remixes by Deerhoof/Kid606 – 7-inch (2012)
- "Real Doll Factory" / "The Honour of the Season" split 7-inch with Lawrence English (2013)
- "Sharp Dressed Man" / "Gimme All Your Lovin'" split 7-inch with Fabrizio Palumbo as (r) (2017)

== Collaborations ==
- ¡Ciaütistico! – collaboration with Larsen under the moniker XXL, for Xiu Xiu Larsen (2005)
- Creepshow – collaboration with Grouper under the artist name "Xiu Xiu vs. Grouper" (2006)
- Remixed & Covered – collaboration with artists including To Live and Shave in L.A. (Tom Smith (filker)), Her Space Holiday, Larsen, Oxbow, Sunset Rubdown, Marissa Nadler, Good For Cows, Kid606, XO Skeletons, Gold Chains, Devendra Banhart, Warbucks, Cherry Point, and Grouper) (2007)
- ¿Spicchiology? – Xiu Xiu and Larsen as XXL (2007)
- A Soundtrack for a Polaroid of Two Trees in Indiana – collaboration disc included with the Xiu Xiu: The Polaroid Project: The Book (2007)
- Desperate Living, Jamie Stewart collaboration with Horse the Band (2009)
- Blue Water White Death, Jamie Stewart collaboration with Jonathan Meiburg (2010)
- Hello Cruel World, track 1, "Napoleon", with Sole (formerly of Anticon) and The Skyrider Band (2011)
- Düde – Xiu Xiu and Larsen as XXL (2012)
- Sal Mineo, Jamie Stewart collaboration with Eugene Robinson of Oxbow (2013)
- Newstalgia, track 7, "8 Bit Memories" with Time (2013)
- Christmas Island, track 4, "Coffin Dance", Jamie Stewart collaboration with Andrew Jackson Jihad (2014)
- Metal collaboration with artist Danh Vo; 3 hour percussion piece played live at the Kitchen in New York City (2014)
- Extinction Meditation collaboration with Mantra; 4 movement percussion piece about environmental apocalypse – movements entitled 2050, 2071, 2092, 2113 (2015)
- Merzxiu – collaboration with Merzbow (2015)
- The Magic Flute, with Susanne Sachsee, Jonathan Berger and Vaginal Davis (2016)
- Puff O' Gigio – Xiu Xiu and Larsen as XXL (2019)
- Moira – Xiu Xiu and Black Leather Jesus (2021)

== XMFX subscription covers ==
No.	Month	Song(s)	Original artist(s)	Appears on...	Ref.
1	April 2020	"Dancing with a Stranger"	Sam Smith and Normani	Love Goes	
2	May 2020	"Plain Gold Ring"/"In Heaven"	Nina Simone/Peter Ivers and David Lynch	Little Girl Blue/Eraserhead (soundtrack)	
3	June 2020	"Sex Dwarf"	Soft Cell	Non-Stop Erotic Cabaret	
4	July 2020	"'See You Don’t Bump His Head'"	Scott Walker	Bish Bosch	
5	August 2020	"I Put a Spell on You"/"Isn't It A Pity"	Screamin' Jay Hawkins/Galaxie 500	At Home with Screamin' Jay Hawkins/On Fire	
6	September 2020	"Less than Human"	The Chameleons	Script of the Bridge	
7	October 2020	"Halloween"	El Muertho de Tijuana	Padre Santo	
8	November 2020	"I Think I'm a Mother"	PJ Harvey	To Bring You My Love	
9	December 2020	"Stripped"	Depeche Mode	Black Celebration	
10	January 2021	"Names"	Cat Power	You Are Free	
11	February 2021	"Kansas"	The Wolfgang Press	Bird Wood Cage	
12	March 2021	"In Every Dream Home a Heartache"	Roxy Music	For Your Pleasure	
13	April 2021	"In the Garage"	Weezer	Weezer (Blue Album)	
14	May 2021	"In Dreams"	Roy Orbison	In Dreams	
15	June 2021	"New Dawn Fades"	Joy Division	Unknown Pleasures	
16	July 2021	"Reject All American"	Bikini Kill	Reject All American	
17	August 2021	"Triple Sun"	Coil	The Ape of Naples	
18	September 2021	"He Hit Me (And It Felt Like a Kiss)"	The Crystals	Non-album single	
19	October 2021	"Hamburger Lady"	Throbbing Gristle	D.o.A: The Third and Final Report of Throbbing Gristle	
20	November 2021	"Dancing On My Own"	Robyn	Body Talk Pt. 1	
21	December 2021	"Mama, You Been on My Mind"	Bob Dylan	The Bootleg Series Volumes 1–3	
22	January 2022	"Black Ships Ate the Sky"	Current 93	Black Ships Ate the Sky	
23	February 2022	"The Passenger"	Iggy Pop	Lust for Life	
24	March 2022	"Cherry Bomb"	The Runaways	The Runaways	
25	April 2022	"Some Things Last a Long Time"/"Ricky's Hand"	Daniel Johnston/Fad Gadget	1990/Non-album single	
26	May 2022	"Modern Romance"	Yeah Yeah Yeahs	Fever to Tell	
27	June 2022	"S.P.Q.R."	This Heat	Deceit	
28	July 2022	"I Hate You"	The Monks	Black Monk Time	
29	August 2022	"Heroin"	The Velvet Underground & Nico	The Velvet Underground & Nico	
30	September 2022	"Warm Leatherette"	The Normal	Non-album single	
31	October 2022	"These Boots Are Made for Walkin'"	Nancy Sinatra	Boots	
32	November 2022	"Lucretia My Reflection"	The Sisters of Mercy	Floodland	
33	December 2022	"The Hall of Mirrors"	Kraftwerk	Trans-Europe Express	
34	January 2023	"A Forest"	The Cure	Seventeen Seconds	
35	February 2023	"How Shall Our Judgement Be Carried Out Upon The Wicked"	Diamanda Galás	Plague Mass	
36	March 2023	"Haenim"/"People Ain't No Good"	Kim Jung Mi/Nick Cave and the Bad Seeds	Now/The Boatman's Call	
37	April 2023	"Blister in the Sun"	Violent Femmes	Violent Femmes	
38	May 2023	"Rosegarden Funeral of Sores"	John Cale	Sabotage/Live	
39	June 2023	"I'm Deranged"	David Bowie	Outside	
40	July 2023	"Never Say Never"	Romeo Void	Benefactor	
41	August 2023	"Losing You"	Solange Knowles	True	
42	September 2023	"Decline and Fall"	Virgin Prunes	...If I Die, I Die	
43	October 2023	"No Words"	Clan of Xymox	Clan of Xymox	
44	November 2023	"What Makes a Man a Man"	Charles Aznavour	Aznavour Sings Aznavour Vol. 3	
45	December 2023	"Super Subway Comedian"	Suicide	Suicide: Alan Vega and Martin Rev	
46	January 2024	"Our Lips Are Sealed"	Fun Boy Three	Waiting	
47	February 2024	"Kool Thing"	Sonic Youth	Goo	
48	March 2024	"Double Dare"	Bauhaus	In the Flat Field	
49	April 2024	"Enola Gay"/"The New Stone Age"	Orchestral Manoeuvres in the Dark	Organisation/Architecture & Morality	
50	May 2024	"Psycho Killer"	Talking Heads	Talking Heads: 77	
51	June 2024	"Is It All Over My Face? (Love Dancing)"	Loose Joints	Is It All Over My Face?	
52	July 2024	"Raping a Slave"	Swans	Filth	
53	August 2024	"Lick Or Sum"	GloRilla	Lick Or Sum	
54	September 2024	"O Death"	n/a	n/a	
55	October 2024	"Rise"	Public Image Ltd	Album	
56	November 2024	"Jolene"	Dolly Parton	Jolene	
57	December 2024	"Wedding"	Einstürzende Neubauten	Alles in Allem	
58	January 2025	"Brand New Bitch"	Cobrah	Kinds of Kindness (Original Score)	
59	February 2025	"66 5 4 3 2 1"	The Troggs	The Vintage Years	
60	March 2025	"Can't Get You Out of My Head"	Kylie Minogue	Fever	
61	April 2025	"Pain"	Boy Harsher	Pain	
62	May 2025	"Orgasm Addict"	Buzzcocks	Singles Going Steady	
63	June 2025	"Breakdown (And Then...)"	Rowland S. Howard	Teenage Snuff Film	
64	July 2025	"My Forever"	Sophie	Sophie	
65	August 2025	"Monkey Gone to Heaven"	Pixies	Doolittle	
66	September 2025	"Kick Out the Jams"	MC5	Kick Out the Jams	
67	October 2025	"The One I Love"	R.E.M.	Document	
68	November 2025	"Eighties"	Killing Joke	Night Time	
69	December 2025	"Goodbye Horses"	Q Lazzarus	Goodbye Horses	
