= Angel Guts: Red Classroom (album) =

Studio album by Xiu Xiu
- Released: February 4, 2014
- Studio: Elmwood Recording, Dallas; Nurse, Los Angeles
- Genre: Art rock; noise rock
- Length: 44:37
- Label: Polyvinyl (US); Bella Union (EU)
- Producer: John Congleton

Xiu Xiu chronology
Nina (2013)	Angel Guts: Red Classroom (2014)	Unclouded Sky (2014)

Angel Guts: Red Classroom is the ninth studio album by Xiu Xiu, released on February 4, 2014. It was released in the US via Polyvinyl Records and in the UK via Bella Union. The album was recorded in the Los Angeles home studio of lead vocalist Jamie Stewart, and in the Dallas, Texas studio of producer John Congleton.

The song "Black Dick" was removed from digital and streaming services in July 2023.

== Background and recording ==
Angel Guts is Xiu Xiu's follow-up studio album to its 2012 Always. The album was recorded at Nurse, the home studio of Jamie Stewart, and the Elmwood studio of producer John Congleton in Dallas, Texas. The instruments on the album are limited to analog drum machines, analog synthesizers, and a drum set.

Stewart's songwriting was influenced by their move from North Carolina to a crime-ridden area of Los Angeles, as well as the aforementioned erotic film. Stewart's home was near "a park divided among four gangs, a lake routinely dragged for bodies, [and] a building wherein two infant skeletons were recently uncovered".

=== Lyrical themes ===
The title of the album is based on the 1979 Japanese erotic film Angel Guts: Red Classroom. Its themes include "racialized sex, double suicides, double penetration, criminality, [and] fear of physical harm". Tiny Mix Tapes described the album preview as "the most Xiu Xiu album ever released", darker than its preceding albums, and "the sound of Xiu Xiu's death". Record label Bella Union compared the album's tone to that of Suicide, Einstürzende Neubauten, and Scott Walker.

== Release and promotion ==
The album's first single, "Stupid in the Dark", was released via Pitchfork on SoundCloud on November 20, 2013. The album was released on February 4, 2014 in the US via Polyvinyl Records and in the UK via Bella Union on CD, clear vinyl, limited-edition red vinyl, and as a digital download.

Music videos were made for "Stupid in the Dark," "Botanica de los Angeles," "Cinthya's Unisex," "Lawrence Liquors," "Bitter Melon," "El Naco," and "Black Dick." The latter two were premiered on non-music websites rather than YouTube —"El Naco" on a horror site and "Black Dick" on a porn site.

"Botanica de Los Angeles" is the end credits music for Creep 2.

== Critical reception ==
Professional ratings
Aggregate scores
Source	Rating
Metacritic	66/100
Review scores
Source	Rating
AllMusic	3.5/5 stars
Consequence of Sound	D−
DIY	3/5 stars
Drowned in Sound	8/10
musicOMH	4/5 stars
NME	7/10
Pitchfork	6.6/10
PopMatters	4/10
Tiny Mix Tapes	3.5/5 stars
The 405	7.5/10

In a positive review, Giuseppe Zevolli of Drowned in Sound praised the album saying, "is the typical blend of passion, pain and awkwardness which makes Xiu Xiu what they are. Fearless, demanding, relentlessly subversive". Tim Lee of DIY thought "Most of the time ‘Angel Guts: Red Classroom’ is either provoking creeping dread or all out panic, with the latter just making the former seem even more frenzied. An album trying to survive under the harshest conditions, is a properly thrilling listen." Leonie Cooper of NME found the album to be quite similar to the band's former records, "superficially it resembles many of Xiu Xiu’s others by draping wracked and fragile vocals over obtuse electronics and analogue atonality. However, Stewart and musical partner Angela Seo venture further than ever before into realms of horror-soundtrack psychodrama."

Ian Cohen of Pitchfork was less complimentary, saying, "Angel Guts is yet another strong, occasionally frustrating record restrained by Stewart’s consistency." Similarly, "AllMusic" commented, "The results could be shocking for shocking's sake -- and sometimes they are -- but Xiu Xiu still deliver nuances within this abrasive territory" and "It might not be as haunting as some of their earlier work, but Angel Guts: Red Classroom proves Xiu Xiu can still make impressively intimidating music -- even if their real strengths arguably lie elsewhere."

In a negative review, Sasha Geffen of Consequence of Sound, described the album as "the most boring, inane, and useless work Xiu Xiu has produced to date" and was extremely critical of the lyrical content saying "This album is offensive not because it broaches subject matter no other musicians will touch, but because it skips across the surface of content other musicians have been tackling thoughtfully for years." Kevin Catchpole of PopMatters was also dismissive of Stewart' vocals throughout the album "[Stewart] takes this style of singing and just drives it into the ground. There is just too much of it to take in when repeated so often over an entire album".

== Track listing ==
No.	Title	Length
1.	"Angel Guts:"	3:28
2.	"Archie's Fades"	3:28
3.	"Stupid in the Dark"	2:50
4.	"Lawrence Liquors"	2:59
5.	"Black Dick"	3:43
6.	"New Life Immigration"	2:47
7.	"El Naco"	3:13
8.	"Adult Friends"	2:23
9.	"The Silver Platter"	3:39
10.	"Bitter Melon"	2:55
11.	"A Knife in the Sun"	2:55
12.	"Cinthya's Unisex"	4:22
13.	"Botanica de Los Angeles"	3:05
14.	"Red Classroom"	2:27
Total length:		44:37

== Personnel ==
Credits adapted from All Music.

Xiu Xiu

- Jamie Stewart – vocals, analogue synthesizer, drum machine
- Angela Seo – analogue synthesizer

Additional musicians

- Thor Harris – drum set, percussion
- Shayna Dunkelman – percussion

Technical

- John Congleton – production, engineering, mixing (Elmwood Recording, Dallas)
- Jamie Stewart – engineering (Nurse, LA)
- Alan Douches – mastering (West West Side Music, NY)

Artwork

- Tim Reynolds – layout
