= Xiu Mutha Fuckin' Xiu: Vol. 1 =

2026 album by Xiu Xiu

Studio album by Xiu Xiu
- Released: January 16, 2026
- Studios: Nurse (Los Angeles); Krankenschwester (Berlin)
- Genres: Art rock; experimental
- Length: 45:23 (standard); 74:27 (deluxe); 51:57 (Bandcamp)
- Label: Polyvinyl
- Producers: Angela Seo; Jamie Stewart

Xiu Xiu chronology
13" Frank Beltrame Italian Stiletto with Bison Horn Grips (2024)	Xiu Mutha Fuckin' Xiu: Vol. 1 (2026)	Eraserhead Xiu Xiu (2026)

Singles from Xiu Mutha Fuckin' Xiu: Vol. 1
- 1. "Cherry Bomb" Released: December 3, 2025; 2. "Some Things Last a Long Time" Released: December 3, 2025; 3. "Dancing on My Own" Released: January 13, 2026

Xiu Mutha Fuckin' Xiu: Vol. 1 is the fifteenth studio album by American experimental band Xiu Xiu. It was released on January 16, 2026, through Polyvinyl. The album is a collection of covers originally released through the band's Bandcamp subscription service beginning in 2020. Three singles were released in promotion of the album; "Cherry Bomb" and "Some Things Last a Long Time" on December 3, 2025, and "Dancing on My Own" on January 13, 2026. The album was received positively by critics.

== Background ==
Xiu Xiu have previously released cover albums, such as Plays the Music of Twin Peaks and Nina. Beginning in early 2020, Xiu Xiu released content through a subscription titled Xiu Mutha Fuckin' Xiu featuring covers, solo versions of tracks, and stems. Subscribers were able to vote on songs for inclusion in Xiu Mutha Fuckin' Xiu: Vol. 1. Jamie Stewart, the band's frontperson, stated that the project was intended as a way to "say thank you" to the original songs, emphasizing an approach focused on learning from the material rather than reworking it to improve upon it.

== Release ==
Xiu Mutha Fuckin' Xiu: Vol 1 was announced on December 3, 2025. On the same day, the band's covers of "Cherry Bomb" by the Runaways and "Some Things Last a Long Time" by Daniel Johnston were released as singles. Their cover of "Dancing on My Own" by Robyn was released as a single on January 13, 2026. The album was released on January 16.

== Critical reception ==
Professional ratings
Aggregate scores
Source	Rating
Metacritic	78/100
Review scores
Source	Rating
Clash	8/10
The Line of Best Fit	7/10
PopMatters	8/10

Xiu Mutha Fuckin' Xiu: Vol. 1 was received positively by critics upon release. At Metacritic, which assigns a weighted average rating out of 100 to reviews from mainstream critics, Xiu Mutha Fuckin' Xiu: Vol. 1 received a rating of 78 out of 100 based on five critic reviews, indicating "universal acclaim".

In a review for Treble Zine, Wil Lewellyn said the band "[honored] the 12 songs presented" and that their takes "[grow] on you by capturing the necessary mood while staying true to who they are". Writing for Clash, Nick Roseblade called the band "masters of covers" and noted how their versions were both faithful to the originals and added something new. Mike Lesuer of Flood Magazine called the album "the most defining work of this stage of the project's lifespan". In a review for Buzz Magazine, Menna Wilson commended the band's creative choice to tie artistic inspirations together. Writing for Narc Magazine, Cameron Wright described the album as both a "love letter to music" and an "engaging and exciting listen".

Jon Buckland of Bandcamp Daily said the band merging "mischievous surprises with the expected darkness" showed the band "still [liked] a little play to accompany their cutting sounds". In an article for Backseat Mafia, Deb Pelser said the album showed that the band's interpretations of songs were their way of "listening closely. Writing for the Quietus, Richard Foster called the album "brave" and said it was an album "which we, in turn, can employ to our own ends". A Pitchfork article called the album "a perfect introduction to the influential art-rockers' dark allure". Brian Stout of PopMatters said the quality and range of material on the album was "a testament to the band's talent". Writing for the Line of Best Fit, Sydney Peterson said the album was both "uncompromising" and "unsparing", and pointed out how the band move between styles of music, instruments and production methods fluidly.

George Ward of Clunk Magazine was slightly more negative towards the album, calling it "incredibly messy" and that "some tracks [felt] too gimmicky to be returned to".

== Track listing ==
Xiu Mutha Fuckin' Xiu: Vol. 1 track listing
No.	Title	Original artist	Length
1.	"Psycho Killer"	Talking Heads	4:05
2.	"Warm Leatherette"	The Normal	3:49
3.	"I Put a Spell on You"	Screamin' Jay Hawkins	2:12
4.	"Hamburger Lady"	Throbbing Gristle	4:17
5.	"In Dreams"	Roy Orbison	3:20
6.	"Sex Dwarf"	Soft Cell	4:40
7.	"Dancing on My Own"	Robyn	5:28
8.	"SPQR"	This Heat	3:46
9.	"Lick or Sum"	GloRilla	3:10
10.	"Some Things Last a Long Time"	Daniel Johnston	4:15
11.	"Triple Sun"	Coil	3:51
12.	"Cherry Bomb"	The Runaways	2:30
Total length:			45:23

Xiu Mutha Fuckin' Xiu: Vol.1 bonus 7" vinyl
No.	Title	Original artist	Length
13.	"Brand New Bitch"	Cobrah	3:17
14.	"Enola Gay"	Orchestral Manoeuvres in the Dark	3:18
Total length:			51:58

Xiu Mutha Fuckin' Xiu: Vol. 1 (Deluxe Edition) track listing
No.	Title	Original artist	Length
13.	"In Every Dream Home a Heartache"	Roxy Music	12:50
14.	"Pain"	Boy Harsher	4:25
15.	"Breakdown and Then"	Rowland S. Howard	7:32
16.	"Jolene"	Dolly Parton	4:17
Total length:			74:27

== Personnel ==
Credits adapted from Bandcamp and Tidal.

=== Xiu Xiu ===
- Jamie Stewart – vocals, guitar, drum machine, synthesizers, organ, bass, piano, production
- Angela Seo – vocals, backing vocals, synthesizers, percussion, production
- David Kendrick – drum set

=== Additional contributors ===
- Tim Berne – alto saxophone
- Mary Halvorson – guitar
- Tony Malaby – tenor saxophone
- Fabrizio Modonese Palumbo – viola, vocals
- Ches Smith – drum set
- Houda Zakeri – backing vocals
- Alan Douches – mastering
- Janelle Abad – design

== Charts ==
Chart performance for Violet
Chart (2026)	Peak position
UK Album Downloads (Official Charts)	49
UK Independent Albums Breakers (OCC)	17
