= Dear God, I Hate Myself =

Studio album by Xiu Xiu
- Released: February 23, 2010
- Recorded: 2009
- Genres: Experimental rock; indie rock
- Length: 36:02
- Label: Kill Rock Stars
- Producers: Jamie Stewart, Greg Saunier

Xiu Xiu chronology
Women as Lovers (2008)	Dear God, I Hate Myself (2010)	Always (2012)

Singles from Dear God, I Hate Myself
- 1. "Dear God, I Hate Myself" Released: January 19, 2010; 2. "Gray Death" Released: January 26, 2010; 3. "This Too Shall Pass Away (For Freddy)" Released: February 2, 2010

Dear God, I Hate Myself is the seventh studio album by American experimental rock band Xiu Xiu released on February 23, 2010. This is their first album since the departure of Caralee McElroy. The album features new member Angela Seo on piano, synthesizer and drum programming, with production by band leader Jamie Stewart and Deerhoof's Greg Saunier. This album marked a departure from the more analogue styles of Women as Lovers and The Air Force, and shifted stylistic choices to a more chiptune style, utilizing the Nintendo DS' KORG DS-10 software to program drum and synthesizer tracks.

Lyrically, the album touches on themes such as body image, eating disorder, race, self-loathing, parental pressure and Stewart's idolization of fictional characters such as Butters Stotch and Pandapple. The album was supported by three singles, "Dear God, I Hate Myself", "Gray Death", and "This Too Shall Pass Away (For Freddy)".

== Composition ==
Many of the songs on Dear God, I Hate Myself were partially or wholly crafted on the KORG DS-10 software for the Nintendo DS. Jamie Stewart composed these songs on a Hello Kitty-themed DS, and even used the KORG DS-10 in live shows, including a rendition of "I Luv The Valley OH!" from Fabulous Muscles.

== Release ==
Dear God, I Hate Myself was released on February 23, 2010, by Kill Rock Stars (US & UK) and P-Vine Records (Japan). A deluxe numbered edition of 100 copies was released by Kill Rock Stars the same year, featuring a sleeve cover printed with silver ink and 12 vinyl stickers by artist J. Morrison. Prior to this collaboration, Jamie Stewart had previously worked with Morrison for a 12-shirt subscription series. 54 copies included just the LP and its sleeve, while 46 copies included the LP, a square of chocolate homemade by Stewart, and a shirt with the slogan "Xiu Xiu For Life" written in blood.

On January 6, 2016, Xiu Xiu released a drunk commentary of Dear God, I Hate Myself on their xiuxiu69 bandcamp, which was initially proposed as a bonus track for the album but was not reconsidered until 2016. The commentary was inspired by the Pet Shop Boys track by track commentary of their album Yes. The recording of the commentary includes Jamie Stewart drinking a tall and strong cocktail "every two songs" and remarking that a strawberry in their drink appeared "gay". At the end of the commentary, during "Impossible Feeling", Angela Seo interrupts the commentary to play loud instruments and yell that Jamie Stewart should attend a cook-out and an ice cream shop to buy a milkshake, one of 40 available flavors.

Dear God, I Hate Myself was reissued and remastered on July 16, 2021, by Kill Rock Stars. As part of Kill Rock Stars' "KRS30" series (for the label's 30th anniversary), the reissue was on black, grey, white, pink and clear/black splatter vinyl and included a bonus 7" including "The Ropes Have Pulled Tight" and "Cute Pee Pee". Following this, the deluxe remaster was released on streaming services and Bandcamp. In addition to these changes, the text reading "2010" on the bottom of the original cover was changed to "2010-2021".

== Songs ==
=== Tracks 1–6 ===
"Gray Death" prominently features Ches Smith on timpani, at the top of a stairwell at a "crappy rental" Jamie Stewart used to live at. Stewart compliments this sound by saying that by being recorded at the top of the staircase, Smith's playing was "starlike". The lyric "sopping wet towel of stupidity" refers to Stewart. Stewart's description of the song's title being incorrectly spelled was due to the fact that Xiu Xiu's touring agent's son name was Grey, so they changed the song's title to Gray as to "not make it sound creepy".

"Chocolate Makes You Happy" is about body image, food, race, self-loathing and also "just about chocolate". The lyric "incredibly dumb, incredibly ugly" also refers to Stewart. The chord changes in "Chocolate Makes You Happy" were inspired by a Gui Boratto song. Stewart also used a sample of a boy's choir on the song, but remarked that "it would be cool" to have a real boy's choir next to the word "slavishness". Greg Saunier of Deerhoof compared the guitar on the song to the Grateful Dead, which is Jamie Stewart's "least favorite non-contemporary band". This remark made Stewart feel "really bad" about themself.

"Apple For A Brain" has lyrics that reference the cartoon characters Butters Stotch and Pandapple (from South Park and Sanrio respectively). Stewart idolizes Butters, and the song is primarily written about him. Angela Seo joins Stewart on vocals for the "lu-lu-lu-lu-lu" jingle, a reference to Butters' "I've got some apples" song from the eighth season South Park episodes "You Got F'd In The A" and "Stupid Spoiled Whore Video Playset". "Apple For A Brain" is about "as an adult man, being obsessed with two cartoon characters, one of which is a child and the other of which is a panda with an apple for a brain". The song includes the lyric "dispraise for what I am, a cartoon with no friends, oh yeah yeah yeah". This is referential to how Butters is depicted as more naive, optimistic and gullible than the show's other young characters and can become increasingly anxious, similar to other emotional themes on Dear God, I Hate Myself. The weeping sound in the song is a slowed-down and backwards sample from the film Double Suicide. The flute sound at the end is from an Optigan keyboard.

"House Sparrow" was initially "a complete disaster" before it was re-arranged by Greg Saunier, who Stewart refers to as "the maestro". Saunier also plays bass guitar on the song. "House Sparrow"'s subject is American necrophile and cannibalistic serial killer Richard Chase. A music video for "House Sparrow" was released, directed by Jason LaRay Keener. The music video features footage of children playing with snails interspersed with zoomed-in spermatozoons, which shortly cuts to news reports about a fictional missing child and the search-and-rescue operation that followed her disappearance.

"Hyunhye's Theme" was the first song written for Dear God, I Hate Myself that made it onto the final tracklist, which Stewart comments on by saying that "five or so songs" were written before "Hyunhye's Theme" that did not make it onto any Xiu Xiu project. "Hyunhye's Theme" also includes nods to a Korean diaspora that exists in a Los Angeles valley, as well as the Xiu Xiu song "I Luv The Valley OH!" which is about, "amongst other things", the aforementioned valley. Musically, "Hyunhye's Theme" is also a tribute to Brazilian composer Tom Zé, who influenced the song by influencing Xiu Xiu to use industrial sounds and musique concrète. "Hyunhye" refers to Hyunhye Seo, the birth-name of Xiu Xiu member Angela Seo.

The title track, "Dear God, I Hate Myself" included drum machine and synthesizer sounds done on the KORG DS-10. The guitar on "Dear God, I Hate Myself" was influenced by Tom Petty's style of guitars. Stewart later called the lyrics on "Dear God, I Hate Myself" "laughably direct", a result of a period where Stewart could write "one of those rare songs where the lyrics just poured out, because it was happening at that moment and I could write everything that was occurring, without having to analyze it or look into the back pages of some masterwork of literature and just steal lines from it." The lyric "Flip off the mirror in protest, who the F-word are you?" is a nod to "I Broke Up (SJ)" from Knife Play. The cymbal crash in the song was also adopted from "Gayle Lynn" from Women as Lovers. A music video for "Dear God, I Hate Myself" was released on February 1, 2010. The video features Xiu Xiu member Angela Seo forcing her hands down her throat and frequently vomiting, while Jamie Stewart eats a large and expensive Escazu chocolate bar. Eventually, the video culminates with Seo vomiting on Stewart, who has been dancing throughout the video's duration. The video was taken down by YouTube for a "terms of use" violation, and eventually re-uploaded to Vimeo. The Harvard Crimson said that the meter of "Dear God, I Hate Myself" brings to mind the "driving compositions" of New Order.

=== Tracks 7–12 ===
"Secret Motel" was composed entirely using the KORG DS-10 software. "Secret Motel" was written on trains while Xiu Xiu was traveling during a 2010 European tour. Stewart has called the sounds on "Secret Motel" "incredibly fast and intertwining lines going bonkers all up and down multiple octaves with zimzam death-cute sounds". The cymbal crash on "Secret Motel" was also taken from "Gayle Lynn" from Women as Lovers, similarly to the previous track. The song also features a period of vocal scatting and beeping on a toy stylophone.

"Falkland Rd." is about sex trafficking and includes lines from Sex Trafficking: Inside The Business of Modern Slavery by Siddharth Kara. The "Falkland Rd." title refers to the real-life Falkland Road in New Delhi, the city's "notorious red-light district" which according to Stewart, contained many underage sex workers from Nepal who were terrorized and trafficked. Ches Smith also plays vibraphone on "Falkland Rd."

"The Fabrizio Palumbo Retaliation" is named after Fabrizio Palumbo of Larsen, (r), Blind Cave Salamander and XXL (a collaboration between Xiu Xiu and Larsen). The working title of "The Fabrizio Palumbo Retaliation" was "Pinot Pinot", named after a two-person band that Stewart had encountered while working in college radio. Stewart also remarks that they was "the first person to ever record Ragady Anne" (who later became The Donnas) during this time period after meeting Pinot Pinot.

"Cumberland Gap" is an interpolation of the traditional song of the same name. John Dieterich of Deerhoof played everything on "Cumberland Gap" (including the quatro and the dobro) with the exception of the banjo and vocals (by Stewart). Stewart's uncle, John Stewart, influenced Stewart's banjo playing on the song.

"This Too Shall Pass Away (For Freddy)" is the penultimate track of Dear God, I Hate Myself, and is the song on the record that most features the high school / junior high Immaculata Catholic School Orchestra on brass and woodwinds. Stewart marks that it was "extremely enjoyable" to work with these "catholic young adults of North Carolina". "This Too Shall Pass Away" was called an "ode to heartbreak and healing" by Terrorbird. The song received a music video directed by C. Spencer Yeh, and portrays "young 20-something life in the style of an overhead 'dungeon crawler' video game" similar to The Legend of Zelda and The Real World. Yeh had previously directed a video for Deerhoof's "Buck and Judy", and repurposed the style in the music video for "This Too Shall Pass Away". The composition of "This Too Shall Pass Away" include bells ran through the Enigma plugin for the Waves software, which Stewart remarked "made the bells sound like a de-tuned electro gamalan." The "Steven" mentioned in the song is Steven Morrissey, who Stewart has previously mentioned being a fan of, listening to The Queen Is Dead by Morrissey's band The Smiths during the making of The Air Force.

"Impossible Feeling" contains piano played by Angela Seo. "Impossible Feeling" is also the only song on Dear God, I Hate Myself which contains real drums, recorded before Stewart moved to Durham in Oakland, California. Ches Smith played and recorded the drum set in an apartment building. The song ends with a "long drone" which was "stolen from someone else", who Stewart never mentioned. Stewart remarked that "who doesn't (steal ideas from other people), except Jesus Christ, Abraham, Buddha, and Muhammad." During the recording of the drunk commentary for Dear God, I Hate Myself, Angela Seo interrupted the commentary of this track to loudly play instruments and demand that Jamie Stewart get a milkshake, one of 40 flavors.

=== Bonus tracks ===
"The Ropes Have Pulled Tight" references the Immaculata Catholic School, the Orchestra of which was prominently used in "This Too Shall Pass Away (For Freddy)" among other tracks. "Cute Pee Pee" is a fetishistic depiction of a mouth being filled with urine.

== Themes ==
"Chocolate Makes You Happy" is about an eating disorder, depicting the subject of the song forcing their hands down their throat to vomit. "Apple for a Brain" depicts Jamie Stewart's fanaticism for fictional characters Butters Stotch (of South Park) and Pandapple (of Sanrio fame). The lyrics for "Apple for a Brain" include Stewart's interpolation of Butters' "I've Got Some Apples" jingle.

== Critical reception ==
Professional ratings
Aggregate scores
Source	Rating
Metacritic	74/100
Review scores
Source	Rating
AllMusic	4/5 stars
The A.V. Club	B+
Drowned in Sound	7/10
MusicOMH	4/5 stars
Pitchfork	7.3/10
PopMatters	6/10
Slant Magazine	4/5 stars
Spin	4/5 stars
Tiny Mix Tapes	4/5 stars
Uncut	6/10

Dear God, I Hate Myself received positive reviews upon release. Dear God, I Hate Myself holds a 74/100 on Metacritic, indicating "generally favorable" reviews.

AllMusic gave Dear God, I Hate Myself four stars out of five. The Boston Globe gave Dear God, I Hate Myself favorable reviews. Drowned in Sound gave Dear God, I Hate Myself a 7/10, saying that "influences are thrown in and bounced around with the mania of a Take A Break prizewinner's trolley dash". MusicOMH gave Dear God, I Hate Myself 4 stars out of 5, stating that it "covers a considerable range of sounds." Pitchfork gave Dear God, I Hate Myself a 7.3/10, remarking that "with Caralee McElroy gone, Jamie Stewart enlists new guests and experiments with 8-bit textures. It's still Xiu Xiu though: look at the title." PopMatters gave Dear God, I Hate Myself a 6/10. Slant Magazine gave Dear God, I Hate Myself four stars out of five, calling it "Xiu Xiu's most vibrant album since Fabulous Muscles".

Spin and Tiny Mix Tapes both gave Dear God, I Hate Myself four stars out of five. The latter compared Dear God, I Hate Myself to the likes of Orchestral Manoeuvres in the Dark, Joy Division and Deerhoof.

== Track listing ==
All tracks written by Jamie Stewart except for "Cumberland Gap" (Traditional)

No.	Title	Length
1.	"Gray Death"	2:56
2.	"Chocolate Makes You Happy"	3:55
3.	"Apple for a Brain"	3:24
4.	"House Sparrow"	2:39
5.	"Hyunhye's Theme"	3:31
6.	"Dear God, I Hate Myself"	3:06
7.	"Secret Motel"	2:07
8.	"Falkland Rd."	3:06
9.	"The Fabrizio Palumbo Retaliation"	3:00
10.	"Cumberland Gap"	1:34
11.	"This Too Shall Pass Away (For Freddy)"	3:34
12.	"Impossible Feeling"	4:10
Total length:		36:02

iTunes Store and 2021 reissue bonus tracks
No.	Title	Length
1.	"The Ropes Have Pulled Tight"	3:35
2.	"Cute Pee Pee"	3:18
Total length:		42:55

== Credits ==
- Recorded in Oakland, CA and Durham, NC
- Mixed by Greg Saunier
- Produced by Thee Fallings Out Brose
- Design by Joe Stewart
- Sticker by J. Morrison
- Mastered by Brent Lambert at Kitchen
- Immaculata Catholic School Orchestra conducted by Consolata Lopez
- All songs published by Will It Burn Music BMI except "Cumberland Gap" (Traditional)

on "Gray Death":

- Greg Saunier – mandolin, guitar, synth
- Ches Smith – timpani, snare
- Jamie Stewart – vox, guitar, the bass guitar, gongs, tambourine, electronic percussion, track whistles, bird calls, snare
- Immaculata Catholic School Orchestra – strings

on "Chocolate Makes You Happy":

- Angela Seo – piano
- Jamie Stewart – vox, programming, guitar, the bass guitar, harmonium, synth, gongs, samples

on "Apple for a Brain":

- Ches Smith – moog, cymbal
- Angela Seo – vox
- Jamie Stewart – vox, game boy, optigan, samples, desk bell, chamberlin, bird call

on "House Sparrow":

- Ches Smith – moog
- Greg Saunier – the bass guitar, electronic percussion, hand claps
- Jamie Stewart – vox, programming, guitar, hand claps, synth, harmonium

on "Hyunhye's Theme":

- Gabrielle Ataladye – cello
- Angela Seo – programming
- Jamie Stewart – vox, guitar, percussion, tenor recorder, samples, piano, synth

on "Dear God, I Hate Myself":

- Greg Saunier – the bass guitar
- Angela Seo – vox
- Jamie Stewart – vox, game boy, guitar, the bass guitar, castanets, tambourine, optigan, percussion

on "Secret Motel":

- Jamie Stewart – vox, game boy, guitar, samples, stylophone, synth

on "Falkland Rd.":

- Caralee McElroy – the bass guitar, electronics
- Greg Saunier – electronic percussion, samples
- Ches Smith – snare, vibraphone
- Jamie Stewart – vox, piano, programming, guitar, synth, optigan, electronics, celeste, glockenspiel
- Immaculata Catholic School Orchestra – strings

on "The Fabrizio Palumbo Retaliation":

- Caralee McElroy – bass synth, electronics, flute
- Greg Saunier – drum set
- Ches Smith – drum set
- Jamie Stewart – vox, piano, programming, guitar, the bass guitar, electronics, bird call, percussion, organ, tambourine

on "Cumberland Gap":

- John Dieterich – drum set, quatro, dobro, percussion, the bass guitar
- Jamie Stewart – vox, banjo

on "This Too Shall Pass Away (for Freddy)":

- Greg Saunier – guitar, synth
- Angela Seo – synth
- Ches Smith – bongos, kalimba, cymbal
- Jamie Stewart – vox, programming, the bass guitar, organ, guitar
- Immaculata Catholic School Orchestra – brass, woodwinds

on "Impossible Feeling":

- Gabrielle Ataylada – cello
- Greg Saunier – electronic percussion
- Angela Seo – piano
- Ches Smith – drum set, conga
- Jamie Stewart – vox, string arr., the bass guitar, tuning forks, cymbals, harmonium
