= Angela Seo =

South Korean and American musician

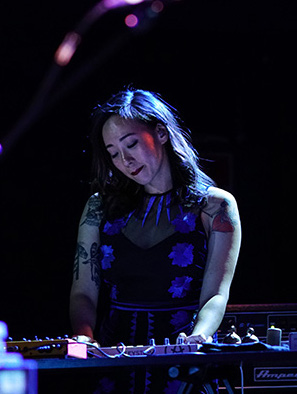
- Seo playing with Xiu Xiu in Denmark, 2017
- Born: Hyunhye Seo; Busan, South Korea
- Education: Duke University School of Law; University of California, Berkeley
- Occupation: Musician
- Years active: 2006–present
- Organization: Mark Ridley-Thomas administration
- Title: Deputy for Public Health
- Musical career
- Genres: Avant-pop; noise; experimental; electronic
- Occupations: Singer; songwriter; multi-instrumentalist
- Instruments: Vocals; keyboards; harmonium; percussion; drum machine; sampler; vocoder
- Years active: 2006–present
- Labels: Polyvinyl; Kill Rock Stars; Bella Union
- Member of: Xiu Xiu; XXL; Deal$
- Website: angelaseo.com

Hyunhye Seo, professionally known as Angela Seo, is a South Korean and American singer-songwriter, multi-instrumentalist and vocalist best known for her role in American experimental band Xiu Xiu.

Seo has contributed to every Xiu Xiu studio project since 2006's The Air Force, for which she contributed lyrics. She formally joined the band in 2009, and contributed to their next album, 2010's Dear God, I Hate Myself.

Seo has also played in the bands Deal$ and XXL (Xiu Xiu Larsen) and played on songs by Holy Hum and Blind Cave Salamander.

== Personal life ==
Seo was born in Busan, South Korea and moved to the United States at the age of 8, where she grew up in Southern California's San Fernando Valley, in the same neighborhood as Xiu Xiu frontperson and lead vocalist Jamie Stewart. Seo's parents were immigrants; she recalls both of them working four to six jobs at once. Seo has said her parents loved music and literature, but had the "Korean idea" of education and a hard-work ethic.

Seo and Stewart lived in Durham, North Carolina, while she attended the Duke University School of Law. Stewart has said that Xiu Xiu had moved to Durham to support Seo's post-graduate studies. Stewart regretted moving to Durham and grew to despise it, as did Seo. Stewart has frequently called Seo their "best friend".

In addition to being a member of Xiu Xiu, Seo was the Deputy for Public Health of the Los Angeles County Office of Cannabis Management. She worked under the Mark Ridley-Thomas administration.

== Xiu Xiu ==
In 2006, Seo contributed lyrics to "Bishop, CA" and "Wig Master" off of Xiu Xiu's fifth album The Air Force. Also in 2006, Seo took the cover photograph for Tu mi piaci. In 2008, Seo contributed lyrics to the song "You Are Pregnant You, You Are Dead" on Xiu Xiu's sixth album Women as Lovers, also under her birthname.

In May 2009, Caralee McElroy announced her departure from Xiu Xiu, though no reason was given apart from her membership in Manhattan-based darkwave band Cold Cave. With McElroy's absence and the absence of Xiu Xiu double bassist Devra Hoff who left the year prior, Jamie Stewart and Ches Smith recruited Seo to join Xiu Xiu in late 2009. After, Xiu Xiu began to work on Dear God, I Hate Myself, recording in Durham and Oakland, California. Seo inspired Stewart to shift Xiu Xiu's motifs again, and Dear God, I Hate Myself included elements of chiptune and video game-based programming, Xiu Xiu using the KORG DS-10 for the Nintendo DS to write many of the songs on the album.

The music video for the title track off of 2010's Dear God, I Hate Myself received polarizing response online in 2010. The video consists of Seo forcing her fingers down her throat, vomiting throughout the entire video. This music video eventually climaxes as she vomits on Stewart, who has been eating a large Escazu chocolate bar and dancing throughout the entire video. Seo and Stewart have defended the video, stating that the video illustrates the eating disorder subject of the song in an extreme fashion.

On the fifth track off of Dear God, I Hate Myself, "Hyunhye's Theme", Stewart dedicates the song's title and lyrical content to Seo. They write about Seo's work ethic, personal life, and impact on the band, as well as naming the track after her.

Seo's vocals debuted on 2012's Always, with her vocals being featured prominently on "Honey Suckle". She continued to contribute to Angel Guts: Red Classroom and played a series of live shows with Stewart and Shayna Dunkelman covering the soundtrack from Twin Peaks. These covers were later rerecorded into a Record Store Day release Plays The Music Of Twin Peaks.

Seo starred in the music video for the title track of 2017's Forget. In the music video, she portrays a stage musician playing the keyboard as a heckler yells sarcastic comments and throws banana peels at her. Seo also directed the music video for "Wondering". She directed the music videos for "Scisssssssors", "Pumpkin Attack On Mommy and Daddy" and "It Comes Out As A Joke" for 2019's Girl with Basket of Fruit. Seo also contributes vocals on the album, and co-produced the entire album alongside Greg Saunier of Deerhoof.

Seo contributes vocals to "Fuzz Gong Fight" from 2021's Oh No, and directed and starred in the music videos for "A Bottle Of Rum", "Rumpus Room" and "Sad Mezcalita".

== Other works ==
Seo's debut studio album is Strands, a two-sided album released on cassette and digitally on Lawrence English's Room40 record label on June 11, 2021. Side one of Strands is dark ambient music, while side two is Seo performing unaccompanied piano. Strands was recorded by Jamie Stewart at Xiu Xiu's NURSE home studio and produced by Lawrence English.

== Discography ==
Solo

- Strands (2021)
- Eel (2023)

As part of Xiu Xiu

- Dear God, I Hate Myself (2010)
- Always (2012)
- Angel Guts: Red Classroom (2014)
- Plays the Music of Twin Peaks (2016)
- Forget (2017)
- Girl with Basket of Fruit (2019)
- Oh No (2021)
- Ignore Grief (2023)
- 13" Frank Beltrame Italian Stiletto with Bison Horn Grips (2024)
- Xiu Mutha Fuckin' Xiu: Vol. 1 (2026)
- Eraserhead Xiu Xiu (2026)

As part of XXL (Xiu Xiu Larsen)

- Düde (2012)
- Puff O'Gigio (2018)
