= Caralee McElroy =

American musician

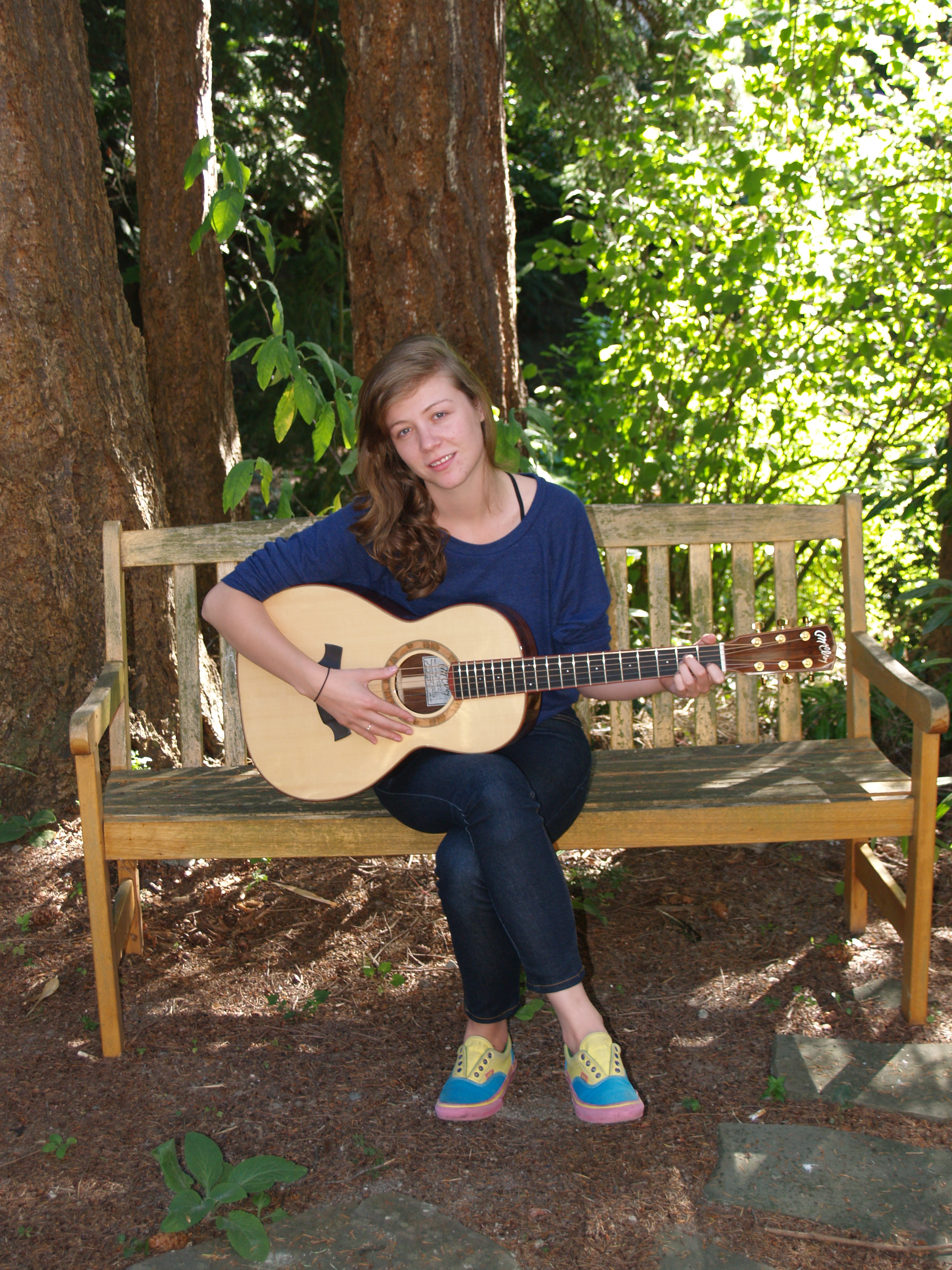

Background information
- Born: December 27, 1983 (age 42); Olympia, Washington, United States
- Genre: Experimental
- Occupation: Musician
- Instruments: Keyboards; flute; bass guitar; guitar; drums
- Years active: 2003–present

Caralee McElroy (born December 27, 1983) is a Brooklyn-based American multi-instrumentalist who has played in the bands Xiu Xiu, XXL, and Cold Cave.

== Biography ==
McElroy was born in Olympia, WA and was raised in Modesto, California and Seattle, Washington. She grew up immersed in both music and the visual arts. Her father, Brent, is a luthier and builds acoustic guitars.

== Music ==
At seven, McElroy started to study the flute, and throughout her school years, she picked up the guitar, percussion, drums, and keyboards.

=== Xiu Xiu ===
In 2003, McElroy met her long-lost cousin, Jamie Stewart of Xiu Xiu. They needed a multi-instrumentalist, so she auditioned and joined Xiu Xiu during their Fabulous Muscles tour in 2004. McElroy left Xiu Xiu in May 2009.

=== Cold Cave ===
In February 2009, Caralee joined the band Cold Cave. She left in early 2010.

=== Other activities and collaborations ===
McElroy appeared on recordings for Casiotone for the Painfully Alone in 2006. As of 2009, she has been collaborating on a yet-to-be-named musical project with Chris Garneau.

== Discography ==
with Xiu Xiu

- 2004 – "Fleshettes" CD single
- 2005 – La Forêt
- 2006 – The Air Force
- 2007 – Remixed & Covered
- 2008 - Women as Lovers

with XXL (Xiu Xiu Larsen)

- 2005 – Ciautistico!
- 2007 – ¿Spicchiology?

with Cold Cave

- 2009 - Electronic Dreams cassette
- 2009 - Cremations CD
- 2009 - Stars Explode split cassette with Prurient
- 2009 - Easel and Ruby 12" single
- 2009 - Love Comes Close CD/LP

with Casiotone for the Painfully Alone

- 2006 - Graceland
- 2006 - Young Shields
