= Jason LaRay Keener =

American filmmaker (born 1985)

- Born: Jason LaRay Keener; May 12, 1985 (age 41); Centre, Alabama, United States
- Website: https://www.youtube.com/@JasonLaRayKeener

Jason LaRay Keener (born May 12, 1985) is an American music composer and filmmaker from Alabama.

== Reining Nails & Catfish with Falcon Wings ==
In 2006, Keener founded his production company, Reining Nails. From 2006 to 2009, he directed several Southern Gothic-inspired surrealistic short films. His film Hallelujah! Gorilla Revival featured guest voice-overs from filmmakers Cory McAbee, Damon Packard, Todd Rohal and Jamie Stewart of the bands Ten in the Swear Jar, Xiu Xiu and Former Ghosts. The film won Best Experimental Short at the 2009 Nashville Film Festival, as well as Best Alabama Short Film and the Kathryn Tucker Windham Storytelling Award at the 11th annual Sidewalk Moving Picture Festival.

In 2009, Keener released a DVD+R EP of his short films entitled Catfish with Falcon Wings. Catfish with Falcon Wings has been remixed by Brighter Death Now as projection for live shows.

In 2011, the short films of Catfish with Falcon Wings were curated alongside films by Woody Allen, Jean-Luc Godard, Harmony Korine, and David Lynch as part of a film series on problems in contemporary society. The series was programmed by the Pavilion Unicredit Art Gallery in Bucharest, Romania .

== The Unreinable Compulsion ==
The Unreinable Compulsion, described as a psychological drama about an irrational murder, was Keener's first feature-length film. The film was self-financed and never distributed. The film starred Jarrod Cuthrell and features actor and dentist George Hardy (Troll 2, Best Worst Movie) as himself.

Keener cites Robert Bresson, John Carpenter, Unsolved Mysteries, Flannery O'Connor, and Edward Hopper as the primary influences for the style and tone of the film, in which a young man in a small town gives in to his irrational desire to recreationally murder a stranger.

=== Synopsis ===
After loner Dewayne Sykes (Jarrod Cuthrell) decides to give in to his irrational desire to recreationally murder a stranger, he begins his search for a random victim and finds one in “Miss Fit” (Jen Stedham), a young jogger he spies at a park. After briefly familiarizing himself with her neighborhood and schedule, he puts his plan into action and commits a murder that will haunt him in ways he could not anticipate.

== Collinsville Trade Day, 1988 ==
It is a found-footage short film featuring his grandfather, Charles Keener, based on footage Charles shot in 1988 of a popular outdoor market in the Northeast Alabama town of Collinsville. The short film premiered at the 2015 Nashville Film Festival.

=== Synopsis ===
In 1988, Charles Keener took a video camera to Collinsville, AL to document the town's outdoor market for his young grandson (LaRay Keener). 26 years later, this newly discovered footage has been edited by the grandson into a short documentary.

== Discography ==
=== Studio albums ===
- Prayers to the Prayer Tree (2023)
- Sorrow Safari (2025)

=== Compilations and additional releases ===
- I tried. (2020)
- Odds are we're even. (2020)
- Where the dog hid while it happened. (2020)
- Rurnt (2021)
- Discount Funeral (2025)
- Recreational Despondency (2025)
- Cryptic Glimpses (2025)
- Awfulizer (2026)
- Rural Modem (2026)

== Filmography ==
=== Feature films ===
- The Unreinable Compulsion (2013)

=== Short films ===
- Collinsville Trade Day, 1988 (2014)
- Hollow Porcelain Fish Chamber (2009)
- Hallelujah! Gorilla Revival (2008)
- Hail Cracking Cobra Eggs (2007)
- The Man with Apple-Shaped Boxing Gloves (2006)

=== As actor ===
- Laura Panic (2007)
- The Man with Apple-Shaped Boxing Gloves (2006)

=== As music composer ===
- Hollow Porcelain Fish Chamber (2009)
- Hallelujah! Gorilla Revival (2008)
- 1000 Year Sleep (2007)
- Hail Cracking Cobra Eggs (2007)
- The Man with Apple-Shaped Boxing Gloves (2006)
