= Merzxiu =

Studio album by Merzbow + Xiu Xiu
- Released: April 18, 2015
- Genre: Noise, drone, dark ambient
- Length: 37:25
- Label: Kingfisher Bluez

Merzbow chronology
Cuts of Guilt, Cuts Deeper (2015)	Merzxiu (2015)	Wildwood (2015)

Xiu Xiu chronology
Unclouded Sky (2014)	Merzxiu (2015)	Plays the Music of Twin Peaks (2016)

Merzxiu is a collaborative album by Japanese noise musician Merzbow and American art rock band Xiu Xiu. It was released exclusively for the Record Store Day on April 18, 2015 through Canadian record label Kingfisher Bluez. The initial run of the LP was limited to only 1000 copies.

Merzbow and Xiu Xiu previously collaborated live in 2010 at a show in (Le) Poisson Rouge in New York. During the recording of the release, both artists swapped music through e-mail and a translator. Jamie Stewart of Xiu Xiu described the tracks off the record as "death drone/extinction meditations... very slow, sonically violent and loud."

== Track listing ==
1. "Merzxiu A" — 19:52
2. "Merzxiu B" — 17:33

== Personnel ==
- Merzbow — performance, mixing
- Jamie Stewart (Xiu Xiu) — performance
- Ryan Dyck — typography
- Masahiro Takahashi
