= Life and Live =

Live album by Xiu Xiu
- Released: 2005
- Genre: Art rock; experimental; post-punk
- Length: 54:45; 23:13 (Without tracks from Fag Patrol)
- Label: Xeng

Xiu Xiu chronology
Fabulous Muscles (2004)	Life and Live (2005)	La Forêt (2005)

Professional ratings
Review scores
Source	Rating
Pitchfork	7.7/10
PopMatters	7/10

Life and Live is a live album by the American experimental band Xiu Xiu.

It was released on the Italian record label Xeng less than a month before the release of La Forêt in the United States. Life and Live consists of Xiu Xiu songs that band leader Jamie Stewart rendered live into acoustic guitar and vocal compositions. Tracks 3,4,8-13 appear on the 2003 release Fag Patrol, So in effect, this compilation contains all the tracks from Fag Patrol (except for an alternative version of "Asleep"), albeit in a different order. It is not known why the EP was interspersed with this release.

== Track listing ==
1. "20,000 Deaths for Eidelyn Gonzales, 20,000 Deaths for Jamie Peterson" – 3:31
2. "Sad Redux-O-grapher" – 3:44
3. "King Earth, King Earth" – 5:39
4. "I Broke Up" – 3:25
5. "Thanks Japan" – 3:29
6. "Sad Pony Guerilla Girl" – 4:39
7. "Asleep" – 1:19
8. "Jennifer Lopez" – 2:02
9. "20,000 Deaths for Eidelyn Gonzales, 20,000 Deaths for Jamie Peterson" – 2:46
10. "Helsabot" – 4:50
11. "Dr. Troll" – 4:17
12. "Brooklyn Dodgers" – 3:43
13. "Nieces Pieces" – 3:24
14. "Clover" – 4:46
15. "I Broke Up" – 3:02
