= Ches Smith =

American musician

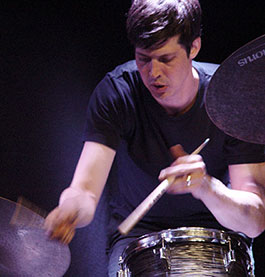

Background information
- Born: Gordon McChesney Smith; San Diego, California, United States
- Origin: Sacramento, California, United States
- Genres: Jazz; rock; experimental
- Occupation: Musician
- Instruments: Drums; percussion
- Website: chessmith.com

Ches Smith is an American musician, whose primary instruments are drums and percussion.

He recorded and performed an album of his own solo percussion pieces entitled Congs for Brums (2006). In 2010 he released Noise to Men.

== Biography ==
Smith was born in San Diego, California, and raised in Sacramento. After studying philosophy at the University of Oregon, he moved to the San Francisco Bay Area in 1995. He studied composition, improvisation and percussion with Fred Frith, Pauline Oliveros, William Winant and Alvin Curran. In 1999, he toured with Mr. Bungle.

== Discography ==
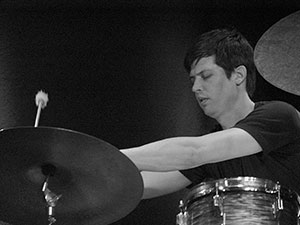
Ches Smith.

=== As leader/co-leader ===
- 2006 – Congs for Brums (Free Porcupine Society)
- 2010 – Noise to Men (Self Released) & Congs for Brums
- 2010 – Finally Out of My Hands (Skirl) & These Arches
- 2012 – Psycho Predictions (Figure Eight Records) & Congs for Brums
- 2013 – Hammered (Clean Feed) & These Arches
- 2014 – International Hoohah (ForTune) & These Arches
- 2016 – The Bell (ECM) Trio w Craig Taborn, Mat Maneri
- 2018 – A Complete and Tonal Disaster (Self Released) & Congs for Brums
- 2021 – Path of Seven Colors (Pyroclastic) & We All Break
- 2022 – Interpret It Well (Pyroclastic)
- 2024 – Laugh Ash (Pyroclastic)
- 2025 – Clone Row (Otherly Love Records)

=== As sideman ===
with Tim Berne

- 2012 – Snakeoil (ECM)
- 2013 – Shadow Man (ECM)
- 2015 – You've Been Watching Me (ECM)
- 2015 – Spare (Screwgun)
- 2017 – Incidentals (ECM)
- 2020 – The Fantastic Mrs. 10 (Intakt)
- 2020 – The Deceptive 4 (Live) (Intakt)
- 2022 - Decay (Screwgun)

with Trevor Dunn's trio-convulsant

- 2004 – Sister Phantom Owl Fish (Ipecac)

with Mary Halvorson

- 2008 - Dragon's Head
- 2010 - Saturn Sings
- 2012 - Bending Bridges
- 2013 - Illusionary Sea
- 2013 - Ghost Loop
- 2016 - Away With You

with Moe! Staiano

- 2001 – The Lateness of Yearly Presentations

with Moe! Staiano's Moe!kestra!

- 2006 – An Inescapable Siren Within Earshot Distance Therein and Other Whereabouts
- 2007 – Two Rooms of Uranium Inside 83 Markers

with Graham Connah

- 2001 – The Only Song We Know

with Good For Cows

- 2001 – Good for Cows
- 2003 – Cows Less Than or Equal To
- 2004 – Bebop Fantasy
- 2008 – 10th Concert Anniversary
- 2010 – Audumla

with Theory Of Ruin

- 2002 – Counter–Culture Nosebleed
- 2003 – Frontline Posterchild

with Mitch Marcus Quintet

- 2002 – Entropious

with Lou Harrison

- 2003 – Drums Along the Pacific

with John Zorn

- 2003 – Voices in the Wilderness (Tzadik)
- 2016 – The Painted Bird (Tzadik)
- 2018 – The Urmuz Epigrams (Tzadik)
- 2018 – In a Convex Mirror (Tzadik)
- 2020 – Les Maudits (Tzadik)
- 2021 – Heaven and Earth Magick (Tzadik)
- 2022 – Incerto (Tzadik)
- 2022 – Suite For Piano (Tzadik)

with Xiu Xiu

- 2002 – Knife Play with Greg Saunier
- 2003 – A Promise
- 2005 – La Foret
- 2007 – Remixed and Covered as Good for Cows
- 2008 – Women as Lovers
- 2010 – Dear God I Hate Myself
- 2012 – Always
- 2013 – Nina

with David Torn

- 2019 – Sun Of Goldfinger (ECM)
- 2020 – Sun Of Goldfinger (Congratulations to You) (Screwgun)
- 2022 - Ozmir (Screwgun)

with Secret Chiefs 3

- 2004 – Book of Horizons
- 2008 – Xaphan: Book of Angels Volume 9
- 2013 – Book of Souls: Folio A
- 2019 – The Book Beri'ah Vol 10—Malkhut

with Aaron Novik

- 2004 – Gubbish: Notations in Tonations
- 2006 – Kipple: Flashes of Irrational Happiness

with Redressers

- 2004 – To Each According...

with Carla Bozulich/Evangelista

- 2009 – Prince of Truth
- 2011 – In Animal Tongue
- 2014 – I'm Gonna Stop Killing

with Will Bernard Trio

- 2005 – Directions to My House

with Fever Pitch

- 2005 – Just Drums 2 Project

with Sean Hayes

- 2006 – Big Black Hole and the Little Baby Star

with Todd Sickafoose

- 2006 – Blood Orange

with Ben Goldberg Quintet

- 2006 – The Door, the Hat, the Chair, the Fact

with 7 Year Rabbit Cycle

- 2006 – Ache Horns

with Fred Frith, Darren Johnston, Devin Hoff and Larry Ochs

- 2007 – Reason to Move

with Marc Ribot's Ceramic Dog

- 2008 – Party Intellectuals
- 2013 – Your Turn
- 2018 – YRU Still Here?
- 2020 - What I Did On My Long 'Vacation'
- 2021 - Hope
- 2023 - Connection

with Leonid Fedorov, Vladimir Volkov, John Medeski, Marc Ribot

- 2010 – RazinRimILev

with Dave Holland

- 2018 – Uncharted Territories

with Moonface

- 2018 – This One's for the Dancer & This One's for the Dancer's Bouquet

with Craig Taborn and Mette Rasmussen

- 2024 – Weird of Mouth (Otherly Love)

with Craig Taborn

- 2026 - Dream Archives (ECM)
