= Always (Xiu Xiu album) =

Studio album by Xiu Xiu
- Released: February 28, 2012
- Genre: Art rock
- Length: 37:46
- Label: Polyvinyl (US); Bella Union (UK/EU)
- Producer: Greg Saunier and Xiu Xiu

Xiu Xiu chronology
Dear God, I Hate Myself (2010)	Always (2012)	Nina (2013)

Always is the eighth studio album by Xiu Xiu, released in the UK and the European Union on February 28, 2012 and worldwide on March 6, 2012.

== Recording ==
Always saw the return of Devra Hoff to Xiu Xiu's lineup. The album was produced by Deerhoof's Greg Saunier and mixed by John Congleton.

== Lyrical themes ==
The songs "Beauty Towne" and "Black Drum Machine" revisited subjects from earlier Xiu Xiu songs. "Beauty Towne" revisited the subjects of "Clowne Towne", while "Black Drum Machine" finished the narrative to "Black Keyboard". "Joey's Song" was dedicated to Jamie Stewart's brother, while "Gul Mudin" was dedicated to the title person. "The Oldness" and "Chimneys Afire" were written by a band member Stewart fired, with the latter song about the author's attempted suicide during Xiu Xiu's tour. "Hi" is "about trying to find beauty and company in the realization that life, for the most part in incredibly difficult and that pretending otherwise only adds disappointment to hardship," while "Born to Suffer" is "about the potential for relief in ending one's own life, even just the thought of it, being mortified by life and about the earthquake in Haiti."

The songs on Always also contained some social commentary. "I Luv Abortion" is about a young friend of Stewart's who decided to get an abortion because she felt she would not be a good parent if she had the baby, and most of the song's lyrics are taken from a series of e-mails between the two. "Factory Girl" is about the migration of women in China from rural areas to factories, and the harsh treatment they received working in the factories.

== Reception ==
Professional ratings
Aggregate scores
Source	Rating
Metacritic	78/100
Review scores
Source	Rating
AllMusic	4/5 stars
Alternative Press	4/5 stars
The A.V. Club	B+
Beats Per Minute	45%
Drowned in Sound	9/10
The Independent	5/5 stars
Pitchfork	7.3/10
PopMatters	7/10
Tiny Mix Tapes	4.5/5 stars
Uncut	8/10

Always has received mostly positive reviews. On the review aggregate site Metacritic, the album has a score of 78 out of 100, indicating "generally favorable reviews".

Simon Price of The Independent gave the album a perfect score, calling it Xiu Xiu's finest album to date. Ed Comentale of Tiny Mix Tapes also praised the album, writing "Xiu Xiu has been around for a while, but it is less a band or a trend that can fade with time than a critical germ cultivated and fed from within mainstream America. Such ugliness is for always." In another positive review, Heather Phares of AllMusic wrote "It's apt that Always was made with Xiu Xiu's devoted fans in mind, since these catchy, desperate, searing, and searching songs aren't always the most accessible, but they show exactly why this band has such a dedicated audience." The A.V. Club's Tuyet Nguyen gave the album a grade of "B+," writing "Jamie Stewart is definitely a bummer. A [person] of few positive affirmations, [they] continue [...] to be recursive, dispirited, antagonized, and bitter. [Their] wily charm is that they're endearingly so. They open old wounds with the grace of a jagged knife, and the catharsis feels great."

Not all critics were entirely positive. Chris Bosman of Beats Per Minute criticized the album for rehashing the sound and lyrical matters of earlier Xiu Xiu albums, writing "So here's a sad truth about people: once they understand the tactics you're using to get your message across, the message loses its impact if you still attempt to approach them from that angle. Xiu Xiu has been doing exactly what they do on Always for ten years and nine LPs now." Pitchfork contributor Carrie Batton also agreed in an otherwise positive review, writing "The difficulty for both casual and hardcore fans is that the receptors attuned to the Xiu Xiu experience have become desensitized, so that when a new album comes along, you have to ask yourself: Why should I even bother to listen to this?"

== Track listing ==
No.	Title	Length
1.	"Hi"	3:37
2.	"Joey's Song"	3:36
3.	"Beauty Towne"	2:40
4.	"Honeysuckle"	3:12
5.	"I Luv Abortion"	2:32
6.	"The Oldness"	3:25
7.	"Chimney's Afire (Mickensian Suicide)"	2:43
8.	"Gul Mudin"	2:25
9.	"Born to Suffer"	3:23
10.	"Factory Girl"	2:21
11.	"Smear the Queen"	3:19
12.	"Black Drum Machine"	4:34
Total length:		37:46

== Personnel ==
The following people contributed to Always:

=== Musicians ===
- Carla Bozulich - Composer
- John Dieterich - Composer
- Devra Hoff - Composer
- Sam Mickens - Composer
- Zac Pennington - Composer
- Greg Saunier - Composer, Producer
- Angela Seo - Composer
- Ches Smith - Composer
- Jamie Stewart - Composer, Engineer

=== Additional personnel ===
- John Congleton - Mixing
- Alan Douches - Mastering
- Jason Martin - Cover Photo
- Damion Ross - Tattoo Art
- Joe Stewart - Design
- Stu Watson - Engineer
