= Forget (Xiu Xiu album) =

Studio album by Xiu Xiu
- Released: February 24, 2017
- Studio: Nurse
- Genre: Art rock; experimental rock; art pop
- Length: 43:57
- Label: Polyvinyl
- Producer: John Congleton, Greg Saunier, Angela Seo

Xiu Xiu chronology
Plays the Music of Twin Peaks (2016)	Forget (2017)	Girl with Basket of Fruit (2019)

Forget is the tenth studio album by experimental band Xiu Xiu, released on February 24, 2017. Produced by John Congleton, Greg Saunier, and Angela Seo, it features contributions from Charlemagne Palestine, Kristof Hahn, Vaginal Davis, and Enyce Smith.

== Background ==
The album cover bears Arabic calligraphy that translates to "we forget". Xiu Xiu leader Jamie Stewart has stated that the album cover has no meaning besides that "it looks beautiful" and is not meant as a political statement: "in hoping to depoliticize it, I suppose that it becomes political." "Petite" and "Faith, Torn Apart" are about women used in sex trafficking on Backpage.

The title was further explained by Stewart: “To forget uncontrollably embraces the duality of human frailty. It is a rebirth in blanked out renewal but it also drowns and mutilates our attempt to hold on to what is dear.”

In a press release, the album was marketed as the band's "most direct engagement with pop music".

== Critical reception ==
Professional ratings
Aggregate scores
Source	Rating
AnyDecentMusic?	7.1/10
Metacritic	78/100
Review scores
Source	Rating
AllMusic	4/5 stars
The A.V. Club	B
Drowned In Sound	8/10
The Irish Times	4/5 stars
Exclaim!	8/10
Pitchfork	6.4/10
PopMatters	8/10
Tiny Mix Tapes	4/5 stars
Uncut	7/10
Under The Radar	7/10

At Metacritic, which assigns a weighted average score out of 100 to reviews from mainstream critics, the album received an average score of 78 based on 11 reviews, indicating "generally favorable reviews".

Andrew Paschal of PopMatters gave the album 8 stars out of 10, calling it "one of Xiu Xiu's poppiest and most accessible works to date".

== Track listing ==
No.	Title	Length
1.	"The Call"	3:17
2.	"Queen of the Losers"	4:23
3.	"Wondering"	4:12
4.	"Get Up"	5:00
5.	"Hay Choco Bananas"	3:48
6.	"Jenny GoGo"	3:57
7.	"At Last, At Last"	3:12
8.	"Forget"	4:11
9.	"Petite"	4:01
10.	"Faith, Torn Apart"	7:56
Total length:		43:57

== Personnel ==
Xiu Xiu

- Jamie Stewart – vocals, guitar, modular synthesizer, organ, programming
- Angela Seo – synthesizer, organ, percussion

Additional personnel

- Vaginal Davis – vocals
- Kristof Hahn – guitar
- Tanisha Hall – vocals
- Devra Hoff – double bass
- Chiara Lee – vocals
- Charlemagne Palestine – carillon
- Greg Saunier – bass guitar, percussion, guitar, synthesizer, vocals, organ
- Enyce Smith – commentary
- Federico Zanatta – vocals

== Charts ==
Chart	Peak position
US Vinyl Albums (Billboard)	24
