= Ignore Grief =

Studio album by Xiu Xiu
- Released: March 3, 2023
- Studio: Nurse (Los Angeles)
- Genres: Experimental; industrial; modern classical music
- Length: 42:14
- Label: Polyvinyl
- Producer: Angela Seo

Xiu Xiu chronology
Oh No (2021)	Ignore Grief (2023)	13" Frank Beltrame Italian Stiletto with Bison Horn Grips (2024)

Singles from Ignore Grief
- 1. "Maybae Baeby" Released: January 12, 2023; 2. "Pahrump" Released: February 15, 2023

Ignore Grief is the thirteenth studio album by American experimental band Xiu Xiu, released on March 3, 2023, by Polyvinyl. It was written by band leader Jamie Stewart and new member David Kendrick, formerly the drummer of Devo. It was produced by fellow member Angela Seo, and recorded by Stewart at their home studio in Los Angeles, alongside a wide array of guest musicians including Charlie Looker, Ben Chisholm, Ezra Buchla, Patrick Shiroishi and Ian Wellman. The album artwork was designed by Janelle Abad, and depicts a white bat over a black background.

Ignore Grief is a departure from the band's previous album, more in line with the sounds and themes seen in Girl with Basket of Fruit (2019). It mainly features a sound that embodies experimental, industrial, and modern classical music. Instrumentally, it incorporates orchestral instrumentation including violins, violas, cellos, double bass, flutes and piano, in addition to the electronic percussion and synthesizers typically used by the band, as well as a variety of other instruments, including, gongs, double reed flute and found objects. Its lyrical content explores life's horrors and human tragedy, dealing with prostitution, sex trafficking, murder, cults and substance abuse, through two halves, one inspired by real stories, and the other one by imaginary ones, sang each by Seo and Stewart.

The first single, "Maybae Baeby" was released on January 12, 2023, followed by "Pahrump" on February 15.

== Background ==
Ignore Grief was announced on January 12, 2023, via the band's social media platforms. Regarding the lead single, frontrunner Jamie Stewart said: "In 'Maybae Baeby,' the singer's viewpoint is of a young person hiding in a fantastical conversation with a tarantula in order to escape a physically abusive parent". The album also marks the first project to feature contributions from new member David Kendrick.

== Composition ==
=== Musical style and influences ===
Ignore Grief departs from the band's previous album, more in line with the sounds and themes seen in Girl with Basket of Fruit (2019). It has been described by the band as an experimental, industrial, and modern classical music album.

=== Lyrics and themes ===
Ignore Grief is a two-part album with one half depicting the suffering of five people connected to the band, and the other depicting imaginary stories. Lyrically, the album deals with said suffering, and acts as an "abstract exploration of the early rock and roll 'Teen Tragedy' genre", through themes such as prostitution, sex trafficking, murder, cults and substance abuse. The imaginary songs are written as a way to offer levity to the band, due to the heaviness of the themes discussed. With the "aesthetic examination" of these issues, the band aspires "to see if there is any way to come out the other side or if there is even any reason. In either case there may not be but to simply turn away would be yet a further act of destruction".

== Reception ==
=== Critical ===
Professional ratings
Aggregate scores
Source	Rating
AnyDecentMusic?	68/100
Metacritic	80/100
Review scores
Source	Rating
AllMusic	4/5 stars
Beats Per Minute	80%
Clash	9/10
The Line of Best Fit	6/10
Slant Magazine	3/5 stars
Sputnikmusic	3.5/5
Under the Radar	7/10

Ignore Grief received generally favourable reviews from critics. At Metacritic, which assigns a normalised rating out of 100 to reviews from mainstream publications, the album received a score of 80, based on 7 reviews.

== Track listing ==
Ignore Grief track listing
No.	Title	Length
1.	"The Real Chaos Cha Cha Cha"	5:18
2.	"666 Photos of Nothing"	3:52
3.	"Esquerita, Little Richard"	3:34
4.	"Maybae Baeby"	3:30
5.	"Tarsier, Tarsier, Tarsier, Tarsier"	4:24
6.	"Pahrump"	4:22
7.	"Border Factory"	3:01
8.	"Dracula Parrot, Moon Moth"	3:07
9.	"Brothel Creeper"	2:58
10.	"For M."	8:18
Total length:		42:14

== Personnel ==
Credits adapted from Polyvinyl.

Xiu Xiu

- Jamie Stewart – vocals, synthesizers, harmonium, percussion, electronic percussion, double reed flute, found objects, recording, arrangement
- Angela Seo – vocals, piano, gongs, no-input mixer, percussion, production
- David Kendrick – percussion, drums

Additional musicians

- Charlie Looker – choral vocals
- Ben Chisholm – synthesizer, piano, electronic percussion
- Ezra Buchla – viola
- Patrick Shiroishi – saxophones
- Ian Wellman – field recordings
- Andrea Kopecká – violins
- Radka Navrátilová – violins
- Katrina Musilová – violas
- Marie Vlčková – violas
- Martina Čermáková – cellos
- Jiřina Hájková – cellos
- Pavel Kučera – double bass
- Jitka Kašparová – flutes
- Marika Nováková – flutes
- Dominika Charvátová – woodwinds
- Sára Štěpánová – woodwinds
- Pavlína Vlková – woodwinds
- Chris Dostál – brass
- Katrina Lišková – brass
- David Zelenka – brass

Technical

- Lawrence English – mixing
- Alan Douches – mastering

Artwork

- Janelle Abad – design
