= 13" Frank Beltrame Italian Stiletto with Bison Horn Grips =

Studio album by Xiu Xiu
- Released: September 27, 2024
- Studio: Nurse (Los Angeles)
- Genre: Experimental rock; noise pop; neo-psychedelia
- Length: 36:10
- Label: Polyvinyl
- Producer: Angela Seo

Xiu Xiu chronology
Ignore Grief (2023)	13" Frank Beltrame Italian Stiletto with Bison Horn Grips (2024)	Xiu Mutha Fuckin' Xiu: Vol. 1 (2026)

Singles from 13" Frank Beltrame Italian Stiletto with Bison Horn Grips
- 1. "Common Loon" Released: June 25, 2024; 2. "Arp Omni" Released: August 13, 2024; 3. "Veneficium" Released: August 13, 2024

13" Frank Beltrame Italian Stiletto with Bison Horn Grips, colloquially referred to as 13", is the fourteenth studio album by American experimental band Xiu Xiu, released on September 27, 2024, by Polyvinyl.

== Background ==
13" was announced on June 25, 2024 with the lead single "Common Loon", which was accompanied by a music video featuring Alicia McDaid. The singles "Arp Omni" and "Veneficium" were released on August 13, 2024.

The album's title comes from a switchblade owned by band frontperson Jamie Stewart. In an interview with Our Culture, Stewart explained, "Switchblades, since the 1950s, are an almost clichéd symbol of 'tough guy' aesthetics. But as an instrument of violence, they're pretty useless... Serving as a symbol for violence and fear while being pretty useless is a fascinating symbol of violence generally." Stewart said one driving force the record was "interesting uselessness", "a stupid contradiction that could have genuine consequences". They said that there were switchblades "around the studio or at our desks or whatever", which functioned as a sort of talisman, guiding the band throughout the production.

== Critical reception ==
Professional ratings
Aggregate scores
Source	Rating
Metacritic	80/100
Review scores
Source	Rating
AllMusic	4/5 stars
Beats Per Minute	79%
Paste	8.2/10
PopMatters	7/10
Record Collector	4/5 stars
The Skinny	4/5 stars
Sputnikmusic	4.2/5
Uncut	7/10
Under the Radar	8/10

13" received generally favorable reviews on release. On the review aggregating website Metacritic, the album received a normalized rating of 80 out of 100 based on 10 critical reviews. Dale Maplethorpe of Far Out praised the album for being an "unpredictable mesh of chaos", and wrote that it "is an absolute joy from start to finish". The Quietus's Claire Biddles said the album "might be Xiu Xiu's best," further noting that it's "funny, terrifying, extreme, horny, embarrassing, relatable – everything that Xiu Xiu have ever been at once."

== Track listing ==
No.	Title	Length
1.	"Arp Omni"	4:22
2.	"Maestro One Chord"	3:38
3.	"Common Loon"	3:31
4.	"Pale Flower"	5:00
5.	"Veneficium"	4:08
6.	"Sleep Blvd."	3:15
7.	"T.D.F.T.W."	3:24
8.	"Bobby Bland"	3:57
9.	"Piña, Coconut & Cherry"	4:55
Total length:		36:10

== Personnel ==
Credits adapted from Polyvinyl.

Xiu Xiu

- Jamie Stewart – vocals, guitar, bass, synthesisers, percussion, bajo quinto, drum machine
- Angela Seo – vocals, synthesisers, organ, sheet metal, percussion, piano, autoharp, production
- David Kendrick – percussion, drums

Additional musicians

- Soo Cho – violin
- David Kim – violin
- Min Kim – viola
- John Lee – cello
- Daniel Park – cello

Technical

- John Congleton – mixing
- Alan Douche – mastering

Artwork

- Janelle Abad – design
