= Eraserhead Xiu Xiu =

Studio album by Xiu Xiu
- Released: July 10, 2026
- Studios: Krankenschwester, Berlin
- Length: 46:29
- Label: Polyvinyl
- Producers: Angela Seo; Jamie Stewart

Xiu Xiu chronology
Xiu Mutha Fuckin' Xiu: Vol. 1 (2026)	Eraserhead Xiu Xiu (2026)

Singles from Eraserhead Xiu Xiu
- 1. "In Heaven" Released: May 19, 2026

Eraserhead Xiu Xiu is a tribute album by American experimental rock band Xiu Xiu, released on July 10, 2026, through Polyvinyl Record Co. Composed of both original material and covers inspired by the Soundtrack to David Lynch's Eraserhead, It is the second tribute album of works created by Lynch, with the first being 2016's Plays the Music of Twin Peaks.

Eraserhead Xiu Xiu also has an ongoing accompanying tour and film that utilizes field recordings and "concert specific homemade instruments". The track "In Heaven" was released as a single on May 19, 2026. According to Xiu Xiu, when recording the record, the original sound design by Lynch and Alan Splet served as a "guiding influence" for their version.

== Track listing ==
Eraserhead Xiu Xiu track listing
No.	Title	Length
1.	"Viento"	12:58
2.	"Sleep Synth"	8:56
3.	"Tetra"	10:46
4.	"Steampipe"	3:51
5.	"Smashy Smashy"	2:56
6.	"Ether"	1:55
7.	"In Heaven"	5:07
Total length:		46:29

== Personnel ==
Credits are adapted from Tidal.

=== Xiu Xiu ===
- Jamie Stewart – synthesizer, engineering
- Angela Seo – synthesizer, engineering

=== Additional personnel ===
- Alan Douches – mastering
