= La Forêt (album) =

Studio album by Xiu Xiu
- Released: July 12, 2005
- Genre: Art rock; experimental; post-punk
- Length: 44:11
- Label: 5 Rue Christine
- Producer: Cory McCulloch

Xiu Xiu chronology
Life and Live (2005)	La Forêt (2005)	The Air Force (2006)

2024 reissue album cover

La Forêt is the fourth studio album by Xiu Xiu, released on July 12, 2005 on 5 Rue Christine. The album features John Dieterich of Deerhoof and Devra Hoff as contributors.

== Overview ==
La Forêt's sound has been described as more subtle and less pop-sounding than Xiu Xiu's previous album Fabulous Muscles. The album was seen as a return to the band's earlier sound.

The instrumentation includes clarinet, string arrangements, and vibraphone. Band leader Jamie Stewart said the tone of the album reflected their personal life where they began to internalize the difficult events that occurred around when Fabulous Muscles was recorded. They described the album as "about reflection and resignation and coming to a sort of resolution".

Stewart described six main subjects of Xiu Xiu songs: family, politics, sex, love and lovelessness, and suicide. The song "Bog People" is about family and loss, and was written late at night while Stewart was in a bout of sadness and loneliness during a thunderstorm. The track "Saturn" is based on Francisco Goya's Saturn Devouring His Son and "wanting to rape" then-President George W. Bush "to death". Stewart had seen the former at the Prado during the 2004 U.S. presidential elections. "Muppet Face" was the name of a cat belonging to Jamie Stewart's friend. The cat died before the song was written. In the animated music video for "Muppet Face", the titular cat appears, with the tag "M.F."

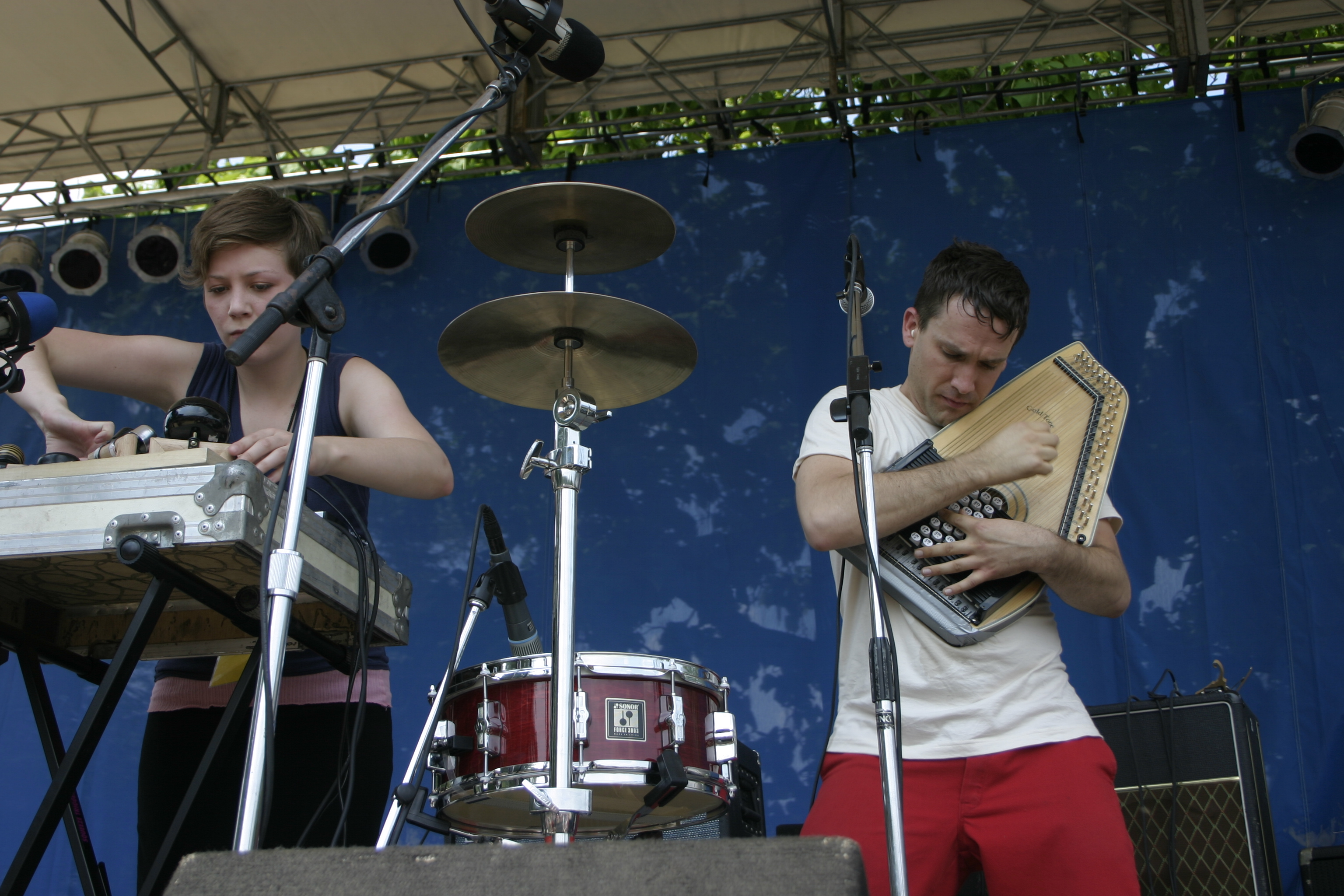
Jamie Stewart and Caralee McElroy performing "Bog People" in 2005

== Reception ==
Professional ratings
Aggregate scores
Source	Rating
Metacritic	82/100
Review scores
Source	Rating
AllMusic	4/5 stars
Christgau’s Consumer Guide	(dud)
Cokemachineglow	71%
Drowned in Sound	8/10
Entertainment Weekly	A−
Now	2/5 stars
Pitchfork	7.9/10
PopMatters	7/10
Stylus	A−
Tiny Mix Tapes	4/5 stars

La Forêt received critical acclaim. On the review aggregate site Metacritic, the album has a score of 82 out of 100, indicating "Universal acclaim." La Forêt is also Xiu Xiu's highest rated album on the site.

Stylus Magazine's William S. Fields gave the album a grade of "A-," writing "La Forêt has the sort of courage-minus-contrivance that is exceedingly (and ironically) rare in music of its dramatic and thematic ilk. For this reason, though I have enjoyed and admired many records this year, this is one of the few I genuinely care about." Jordan Dowling of Drowned in Sound also gave the album a positive review, writing "Easy listening this amn't, but if you want a rollercoaster ride into deep recessions and to be thrilled by the sounds that surround you, then this could be the perfect album for you." Allmusic's Heather Phares wrote "La Foret may be more delicate and less immediate than some of Xiu Xiu's other work (especially Fabulous Muscles), but at its best, it may have even more impact because of that."

Brandon Stosuy of Pitchfork described the album as "less jagged, more elegant" than previous albums, and subtler than Fabulous Muscles.

== Track listing ==
No.	Title	Length
1.	"Clover"	5:13
2.	"Muppet Face"	3:25
3.	"Mousey Toy"	3:29
4.	"Pox"	4:10
5.	"Baby Captain"	3:43
6.	"Saturn"	3:21
7.	"Rose of Sharon" (Grey Ghost Version)"	5:05
8.	"Ale"	5:41
9.	"Bog People"	3:21
10.	"Dangerous You Shouldn't Be Here"	3:53
11.	"Yellow Raspberry"	3:06
Total length:		44:11

== Personnel ==
The following people contributed to La Forêt:

=== Xiu Xiu ===
- Jamie Stewart - Vocals, Guitar (1,2,4,5,10), Programming (2,4,6,9,11), Synthesizer (2,3,6,10), Percussion (3,5,6), Piano (3,4), Bass (5), Harmonium (7), Autoharp (9)
- Cory McCulloch - Production, Synthesizer (3,6), Mandolin (3), Piano (3), Bass (4), Harmonium (6), Percussion (10)
- Caralee McElroy - Synthesizer (5,7,9), Harmonium (2,7), Percussion (8,9), Piano (9)
- Ches Smith - Vibraphone (1), Drums (11)

=== Additional personnel ===
- Devra Hoff - Double Bass (1,7,11)
- John Dieterich - Casio Guitar (1), Programming (11), Vibraphone (11)
- Miya Zane Osaki - Artwork, Design, Bass (1,11)
- Alan Wiley - Tuba Mouth Piece (2), Tuba (5)
- Marika Hughes - Cello (7)
- Sam Mickens - String Arrangements (7)
- Ben Goldberg - Clarinet (8), Bass Clarinet (8)
- Nick Hennies - Percussion (11)
