= Remixed & Covered =

Studio album by Xiu Xiu
- Released: April 10, 2007
- Length: 83:30
- Label: 5RC

Professional ratings
Review scores
Source	Rating
Pitchfork Media	7.0/10
Tiny Mix Tapes	3/5 stars

Remixed & Covered is a 2007 double album by Xiu Xiu. One disc contains cover versions of the band's songs, whilst the other contains remixes of their originals.

== Track listing ==
=== Disc One (Covered) ===
1. Larsen - "Mousey Toy" (originally from La Forêt)
2. Oxbow - "Saturn" (originally from La Forêt)
3. Sunset Rubdown - "Apistat Commander" (originally from A Promise)
4. Marissa Nadler - "Clowne Towne" (originally from Fabulous Muscles)
5. Good For Cows - "Sad Pony Guerilla Girl" (originally from A Promise)
6. Kid 606 - "Fabulous Muscles" (originally from Fabulous Muscles)
7. Why? - "The Wig Master" (originally from The Air Force, title adds "The")
8. Her Space Holiday - "I Love The Valley OH!" (originally from Fabulous Muscles)
9. Devendra Banhart - "Support Our Troops" (originally from Fabulous Muscles, title omits "OH! (Black Angels OH!)")

=== Disc Two (Remixed) ===
1. "Hello From Eau Claire" (Remixed by Gold Chains) (originally from The Air Force)
2. "Ceremony" (Remixed by Xiu Xiu) (originally from Chapel of the Chimes)
3. "Suha" (Remixed by Warbucks) (originally from Knife Play)
4. "Ale" (Remixed by Cherry Point) (originally from La Forêt)
5. "Over Over" (Remixed by Son) (originally from Knife Play)
6. "Buzz Saw" (Remixed by This Song is a Mess but So Am I) (originally from The Air Force)
7. "Bishop, CA" (Remixed by Kid 606) (originally from The Air Force)
8. "Tonite & Today" (Remixed by Grouper) (originally from Knife Play, title omits (What 'chu talkin' 'bout?))
9. "The Air Force" (Remixed by To Live and Shave in L.A.) (uses various tracks from The Air Force)

=== iTunes/eMusic/Spotify exclusives ===
1. "Apistat Commander" (Covered by Parts & Labor) (originally from A Promise)
2. "Clowne Towne" (Covered by So So Modern) (originally from Fabulous Muscles)
3. "I Broke Up" (Remixed by Kill Me Tomorrow) (originally from Knife Play, title omits (SJ))
4. "I Love The Valley Oh" (Covered by XO Skeletons) (originally from Fabulous Muscles, titled "I Luv The Valley OH!")
