= Tu mi piaci =

EP by Xiu Xiu
- Released: June 20, 2006
- Length: 17:56
- Label: Acuarela

Xiu Xiu chronology
The Air Force (2006)	Tu mi piaci (2006)	Women as Lovers (2008)

Professional ratings
Review scores
Source	Rating
Pitchfork	(8.0/10)

Tu mi piaci (Italian for 'I like you') is an EP of cover songs by American band Xiu Xiu, released on June 20, 2006 on Acuarela.

Future Xiu Xiu member Angela Seo took the photograph on the cover.

== Track listing ==
1. "He Needs Me" (Nina Simone) – 2:00
2. "Don't Cha" (Pussycat Dolls) – 4:00
3. "Kangaroo" (Alex Chilton) – 4:12
4. "Blueberry Mine Shaft" (Nedelle) – 2:52
5. "All We Ever Wanted Was Everything" (Bauhaus) – 4:52
