= Nina (Xiu Xiu album) =

Studio album by Xiu Xiu
- Released: December 3, 2013
- Genre: Avant-garde jazz
- Length: 49:10
- Label: Graveface

Xiu Xiu chronology
Always (2012)	Nina (2013)	Angel Guts: Red Classroom (2014)

Nina is a Nina Simone tribute album by Xiu Xiu. It was released on Graveface Records on December 3, 2013, to generally favorable reviews.

== Recording ==
The idea for the album came while band leader Jamie Stewart was on tour with Swans. Nina was recorded in a day. The album features Stewart's voice, Ches Smith on drums, Tim Berne and Tony Malaby on saxophones, Andrea Parkins on accordion, and Mary Halvorson on guitar. The latter four had experience in avant jazz. The album reimagines rather than recreates Nina Simone's songs. It was released on Graveface Records on December 3, 2013.

== Reception ==
Professional ratings
Aggregate scores
Source	Rating
Metacritic	65/100
Review scores
Source	Rating
The 405	5.5/10
All About Jazz	2/5 stars
AllMusic	4/5 stars
Blurt	2/5 stars
Consequence of Sound	1.5/5 stars
Exclaim!	6/10
Pitchfork	4.7/10
Slant Magazine	3.5/5 stars
Tiny Mix Tapes	2.5/5 stars
Under the Radar	6.5/10

Nina received a score of 65 (out of 100) from the ratings aggregator Metacritic, which indicates "generally favorable" reviews. Nate Chinen from The New York Times described the album as accentuating Simone's "spooky, unsettling side". He adds that Stewart's vocals add to the "psychodrama" in "Four Women" and "the wildness" in "Wild Is the Wind". Chinen thought the art rock Nina Simone covers field was already crowded before Nina. Heather Phares of AllMusic considered Stewart's stylistic choices "provocative" and the album Stewart's "most avant-garde ... in years". She added that the album considered the "more progressive aspects" of Simone's music. Kyle Fowle of Slant Magazine thought the album to be Xiu Xiu's "most ambitious ... in years". He thought Stewart's vocal style was out of place on "Don't Explain" and "Just Say I Love Him". Billy Hamilton of Under the Radar wrote that Simone would approve of the album. Mark Richardson of Pitchfork noted a mystical connection between Xiu Xiu and Simone as artists who perform raw emotions, but described the album as a "wasted opportunity" and "weirdly conservative". For this, he blamed Stewart's vocals for being "theatrical" and insincere. Richardson praised the album's selection of songs covered.

== Track listing ==
No.	Title	Length
1.	"Don't Smoke in Bed"	4:48
2.	"Don't Explain"	4:28
3.	"Wild Is The Wind"	6:07
4.	"Where Can I Go?"	4:06
5.	"See Line Woman"	2:35
6.	"Just Say I Love Him"	3:25
7.	"Four Women"	4:13
8.	"Pirate Jenny"	5:52
9.	"You'd Be So Nice"	3:49
10.	"The Other Woman"	2:54
11.	"Flo Me La"	6:53
Total length:		49:10

== Personnel ==
- Jamie Stewart – vocals, writer, producer
- Ches Smith – drums, producer, arrangements

Additional personnel

- Andrea Parker – accordion, electronics, piano, Moog
- Mary Halvorson – guitar
- Tim Berne – alto saxophone, baritone saxophone
- Tony Malaby – tenor saxophone
- Aaron Nevezie – recording engineer
- Chris Koltay – mixing
- Collin Jordan – mastering engineer
