= Good for Cows =

American experimental jazz band

Good For Cows is an experimental jazz band from Oakland, United States. Their line-up consists of two member of Xiu Xiu: drummer Ches Smith and bassist Devra Hoff.

== Beginning ==
Band claims they formed in Oakland, CA in 1999 "when no one else would show up for band practice".

== Discography ==
Title	Year	Label
Good for Cows	2001	Evander Music
Less Than or Equal to	2003	Free Porcupine Society
Bebop Fantasy	2004	Asian Man Records
10th Anniversary Concert	2008	Bleeding Ear
Audumla	2010	Web of Mimicry
