= ¿Spicchiology? =

Studio album by XXL
- Released: May 22, 2007
- Recorded: 2007
- Genres: Post-rock, experimental rock
- Label: Important Records

XXL chronology
¡Ciaütistico! (2005)	¿Spicchiology? (2007)	Düde (2012)

Professional ratings
Review scores
Source	Rating
Alternative Press	3.5/5 stars
Pitchfork	7.4/10
Tiny Mix Tapes	3/5 stars

¿Spicchiology? is the second album from XXL, the collaborative effort of experimental rock bands Larsen and Xiu Xiu.

== Track listing ==
No.	Title	Length
1.	"So Easy, So Cheap"	2:03
2.	"Daydrinking"	3:53
3.	"Little Mouse of the Favelas"	4:15
4.	"King of Koalas"	4:50
5.	"The Green Count Tapes"	4:40
6.	"Last in the Society"	3:40
7.	"...Nothing About Dwarves?"	5:45
8.	"Tale of Brother Cakes and Sugar Dust"	9:52
