= Xiu Xiu =

American experimental band

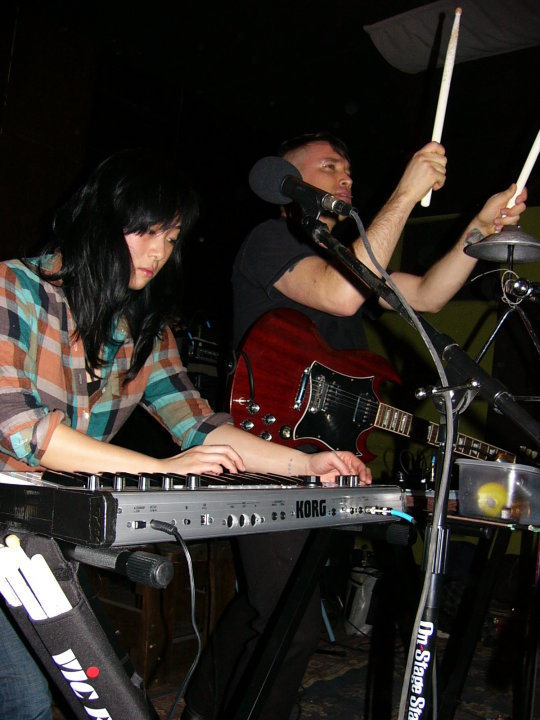
- Angela Seo and Jamie Stewart of Xiu Xiu, 2010

Background information
- Origin: San Jose, California, U.S.
- Genres: Experimental rock; indie rock; art rock; noise pop; electronic; post-punk; art pop
- Works: Discography
- Years active: 2002–present
- Labels: Polyvinyl; Upset the Rhythm; Bella Union; 5 Rue Christine; Absolutely Kosher; Free Porcupine Society; Kill Rock Stars
- Spinoffs: XXL
- Members: Jamie Stewart; Angela Seo; David Kendrick
- Past members: Cory McCulloch; Lauren Andrews; Yvonne Chen; Caralee McElroy; Ches Smith; Shayna Dunkelman; (see Band members section for others)
- Website: xiuxiu.org

Xiu Xiu (/ˈʃuːʃuː/ SHOO-shoo) is an American experimental rock band, formed in 2002 by singer-songwriter Jamie Stewart in San Jose, California. The line-up consists of multi-instrumentalists Stewart (the only constant member since formation), Angela Seo, and percussionist David Kendrick. The band's name comes from the Chinese film Xiu Xiu: The Sent Down Girl, which Stewart and fellow founding member Corry McCulloch watched during the early days of their project and related to the tragedies faced by the lead character from the movie.

Xiu Xiu released their first two albums, Knife Play (2002) and A Promise (2003), on 5 Rue Christine to positive critical reception. In-between the two, the EP Chapel of the Chimes was released via Absolutely Kosher. The compilation album Fag Patrol was released shortly after, and their third studio album Fabulous Muscles was released in 2004. La Forêt was released in 2005 after Caralee McElroy joined the group, and The Air Force followed in 2006. 2008's Women as Lovers was released via the main Kill Rock Stars label in 2008, and McElroy departed the group shortly afterwards.

Dear God, I Hate Myself was released in 2010 and was the first Xiu Xiu album to prominently feature longtime member Angela Seo. Following a signing to Polyvinyl and Bella Union, Xiu Xiu released Always (2012) and Angel Guts: Red Classroom (2014). In between those two projects, the group released a Nina Simone tribute project, Nina, in late 2013 via Graveface Records.

Plays the Music of Twin Peaks (2016) followed, an album consisting of covers from the Twin Peaks soundtracks originally as a Record Store Day exclusive release but re-released by Polyvinyl later that year. Forget (2017) and Girl with Basket of Fruit (2019) were released afterwards, and Xiu Xiu released their twelfth album Oh No in 2021. Their thirteenth album, Ignore Grief, was released in March 2023, and their fourteenth, 13" Frank Beltrame Italian Stiletto with Bison Horn Grips, was released in September 2024.

In July 2025, the band announced on Instagram that they were removing their music from Spotify in response to Daniel Ek's investment in AI war drones.

== History ==
=== 2002–2004: Formation and early years ===
Jamie Stewart formed Xiu Xiu in 2002 after their previous band, Ten in the Swear Jar, disbanded. Stewart and Cory McCulloch continued from the previous group, and were joined by Yvonne Chen and Lauren Andrews. The band's sound was characterized by its use of indigenous instruments and programmed drums in place of traditional rock instruments: harmonium, mandolin, brass bells, gongs, keyboards, and a cross between a guitarrón mexicano and a cello for bass, etc.

On February 19, 2002, Xiu Xiu released their first album Knife Play, and its successor EP Chapel of the Chimes, on August 13, 2002, blending both melody and cacophony with a heavy reliance on percussive instrumentation and brass instrumentation. In a review of the album, Pitchfork remarked, "Each track on Knife Play is like a rock song captured in a photo negative, with all the hidden details brought frighteningly to the fore".

Following 2002, the group would shrink in membership as Yvonne Chen left to focus on her vegan boutique Otsu and self-published magazine Zum, while Cory McCulloch also stopped touring, focusing instead on producing the band's next two LPs. A personal loss would affect Xiu Xiu as well, as Jamie Stewart's father, musician and record producer Michael Stewart was found dead after an apparent suicide. Coping with this loss, Stewart would record the group's second album, A Promise, which released on February 18, 2003.

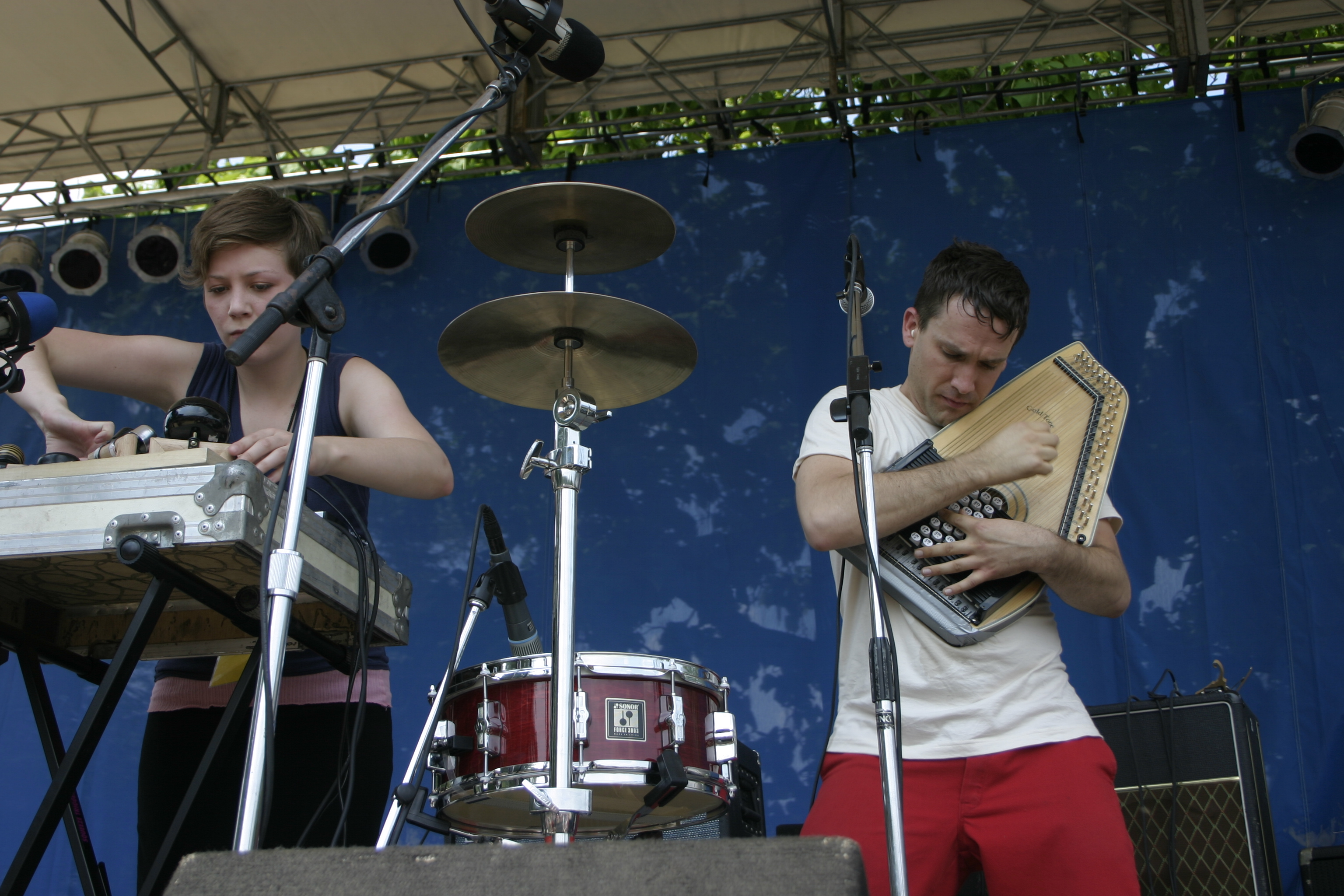
Jamie Stewart and Caralee McElroy performing "Bog People" from La Forêt in July 2005

Continuing to focus on the subject matter of Jamie Stewart's personal life – as witnessed previously by Knife Play – A Promise acts like a concept record of internal despair. Consisting of ten tracks, the record was oriented towards a more or less acoustic presentation, rather than relying on the booming brass and percussion which had worked to make Knife Play. However, the record did not veer from the formulated programming for which Stewart and McCulloch would be praised by fans and critics alike. A Promise also contains a cover of Tracy Chapman's "Fast Car", a version that has been praised for its stripped sound and Stewart's distressing vocals.

During this time, Stewart recorded Fag Patrol, which was released on May 27, 2003, a collection of previous recorded material as well as covers of songs by The Smiths and their previous group with McCulloch, Ten in the Swear Jar. Released as a handmade CD by Rob Fisk's and Kelly Goodefisk's Free Porcupine Society, Fag Patrol was limited to only a few hundred copies (however saw a CD repress in 2005, and a vinyl reissue by Improved Sequence in 2021).

On February 17, 2004, Stewart and McCulloch released what is considered by many to be the group's most accessible album, Fabulous Muscles. More pop-friendly in its sound than previous releases, Fabulous Muscles boosted Xiu Xiu to new heights in terms of popularity, largely thanks to its single "I Luv the Valley OH!". The tone of the album reflected an "incredibly, incredibly violent, incredibly jarring, and difficult to take" string of events in Stewart's life. Stewart described their lyrics as "never fictional". They told Pitchfork that Xiu Xiu songs are based around five topics: family, politics, sex, love and lovelessness, suicide, and how they are connected.

With the departure of Lauren Andrews in 2003 – who wished to focus on her academic studies – Stewart was joined on stage by their "long-lost" cousin, Caralee McElroy in 2004. The two would tour relentlessly throughout that year, releasing not only the group's third LP, but also split recordings with This Song Is a Mess But So Am I and Bunkbed, along with the "Fleshettes" single – which featured a rendition of the Ten in the Swear Jar track "Helsabot" by McElroy.

=== 2004–2010: La Forêt to Dear God, I Hate Myself ===
Seen as a return to Stewart's more dark and crabby demeanor, Xiu Xiu's fourth album La Forêt, which released on July 12, 2005, alluded to a frustration which Stewart had felt throughout the process of recording their 2004 record. Centered around the topic of "horrible times in horrible lives" as well as Stewart's personal frustrations with then-U.S. President George W. Bush, La Forêt is characterized by an altogether different sound – layered by mandolin, harmonium, clarinet, cello, autoharp, and tuba. In addition to La Forêt, Xiu Xiu would join Italian experimental group Larsen in forming XXL, which released its first LP, ¡Ciaütistico!, on September 20, 2005, followed later by its successor ¿Spicchiology?, on May 22, 2007. Stewart also issued formative splits throughout 2005, working with artists such as The Paper Chase, Devendra Banhart, and Kill Me Tomorrow.

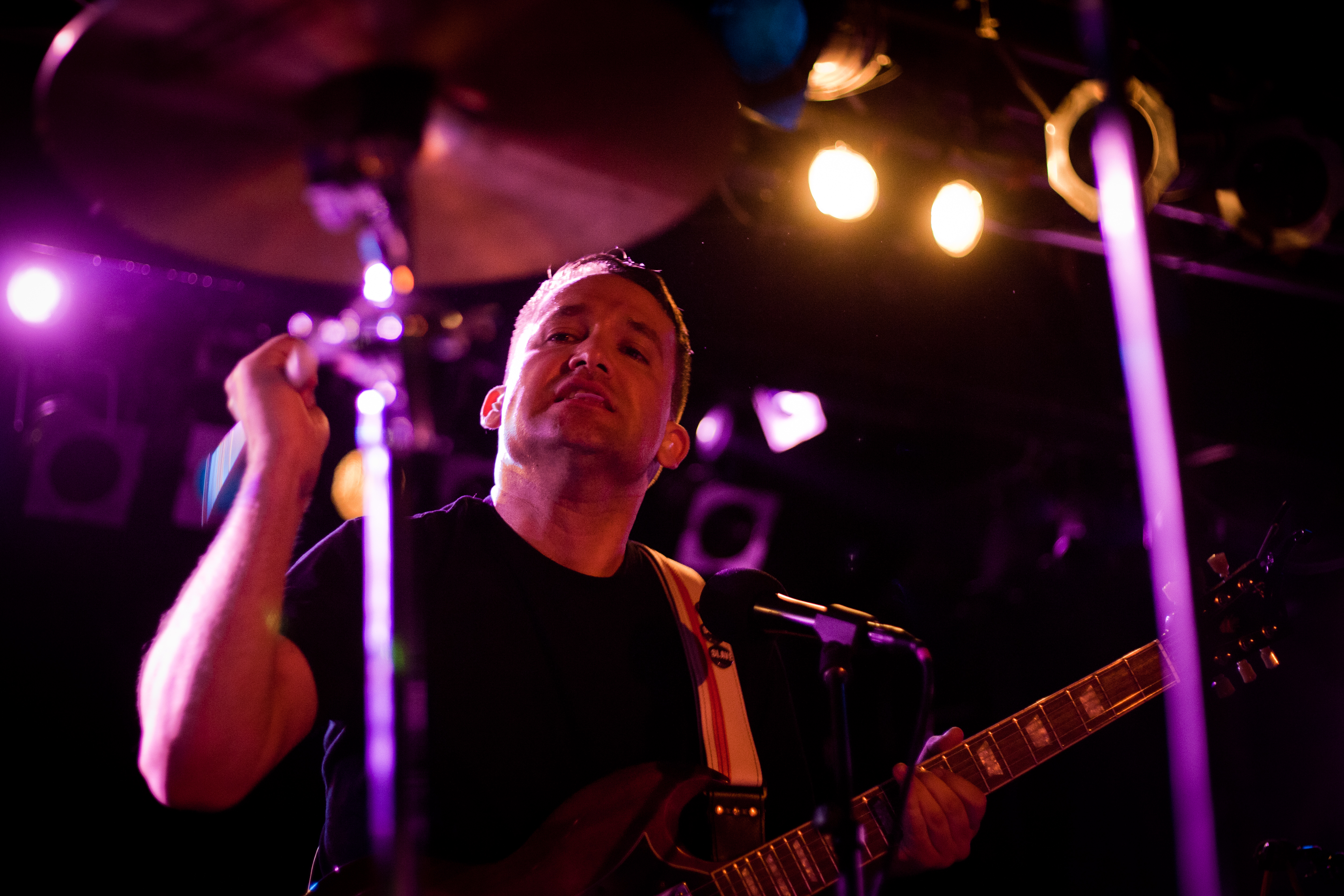
Jamie Stewart at a performance in Stockholm, Sweden, November 2010

In 2006, Stewart would break from tradition by ending their professional relationship with McCulloch. They then started recording with San Francisco–based band Deerhoof's drummer Greg Saunier as producer for Xiu Xiu's fifth LP entitled The Air Force which released on September 12, 2006. Saunier, who had previously worked with Stewart on Knife Play, created for the record a greater wall of sound – a stark contrast to that of McCulloch's discordant attitude towards production. The Air Force would be supported throughout 2006 by a three piece ensemble, as Stewart and McElroy were joined by drummer/percussionist Ches Smith, who himself had previously worked with the group on Knife Play. Produced by Greg Saunier, Stewart said that the album is about "making other people feel bad" instead of feeling bad oneself and the year it was released was "one of the first not dominated by personal tragedies". Its major themes are "guilt and sex as opposed to sorrow and sex". Stewart considered it their best and most consciously pop album yet. They said that the band was obsessed with Weezer's Blue Album and The Smiths' The Queen Is Dead while on tour, though the album does not reflect those albums particularly. The Air Force also contained the band's first album-based songs without vocals by Stewart – with McElroy singing "Hello From Eau Claire", as well as the instrumental piece "Saint Pedro Glue Stick".

A third EP – Tu mi piaci ("I like you") – of cover songs originally recorded by acts such as Bauhaus, Nedelle, Big Star, The Pussycat Dolls, and Nina Simone was released on June 20, 2006, along with a collaboration with ambient artist Grouper, entitled Creepshow which released on November 7, 2006. The following year, on April 10, 2007, Xiu Xiu released Remixed & Covered, a double album with the first disc consisting of covers of Xiu Xiu songs performed by other bands and artists such as Devendra Banhart, Oxbow, and Sunset Rubdown among others, and the second disc consisting of remixes of Xiu Xiu songs from the likes of Grouper, Kid606, and Gold Chains among others.

Shortly thereafter, Xiu Xiu would release their sixth album, Women as Lovers, on January 28, 2008. Their longest LP to date, Women as Lovers attempts to hone the synth-pop influences of the group's sound. Stewart's and McElroy's duet with Michael Gira of Swans on a cover of David Bowie and Queen's "Under Pressure" is representative of this. Touring that year alongside Xiu Xiu aluminist Devra Hoff on bass, the band's second four-piece incarnation would not last long, as Hoff abruptly left the group soon after touring began.

In May 2009, it was revealed that Caralee McElroy would no longer work with Xiu Xiu. Speculations ran as to what reasons McElroy had for leaving the group after five years of recording and touring, though no explanation was given other than her subsequent membership in Manhattan-based darkwave group Cold Cave, which she soon after departed from in 2010. With the vacancies left by both Hoff and McElroy, Stewart and Smith recruited Angela Seo in late 2009. Thereafter, the group would begin work on its seventh album Dear God, I Hate Myself, recording in both Oakland, California as well as Durham, North Carolina. Once again shifting motifs, Xiu Xiu would this time choose to experiment with video game-based programming, using the KORG DS-10 music creation program game cartridge on the Nintendo DS to write many of the songs which appear on the album, which released on February 23, 2010. The music video for the song "Dear God, I Hate Myself" received attention online in. The video consists of Seo inducing vomiting over the course of the three-minute song, culminating with her vomiting on Stewart, who has been eating a chocolate bar during the entire video. Seo and Stewart have defended the video online and in interviews, stating that the video illustrates the subject of the song in an extreme and visceral fashion.

=== 2010–2017: Always to Forget ===
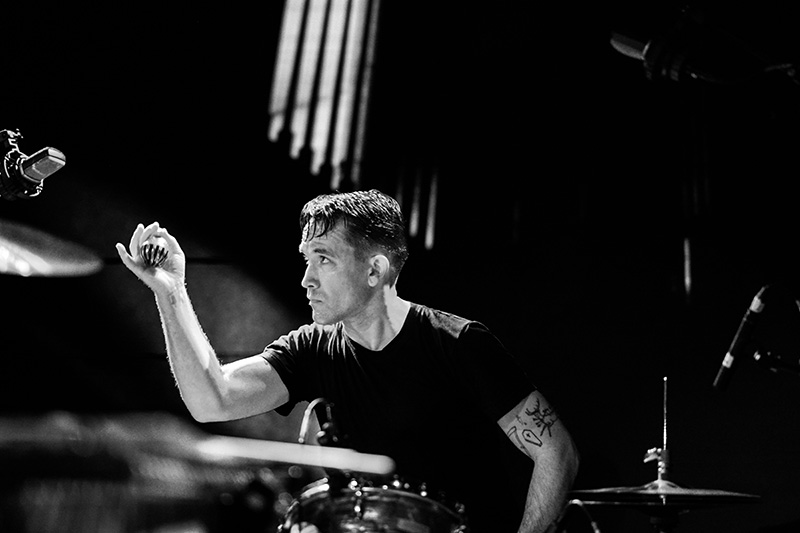
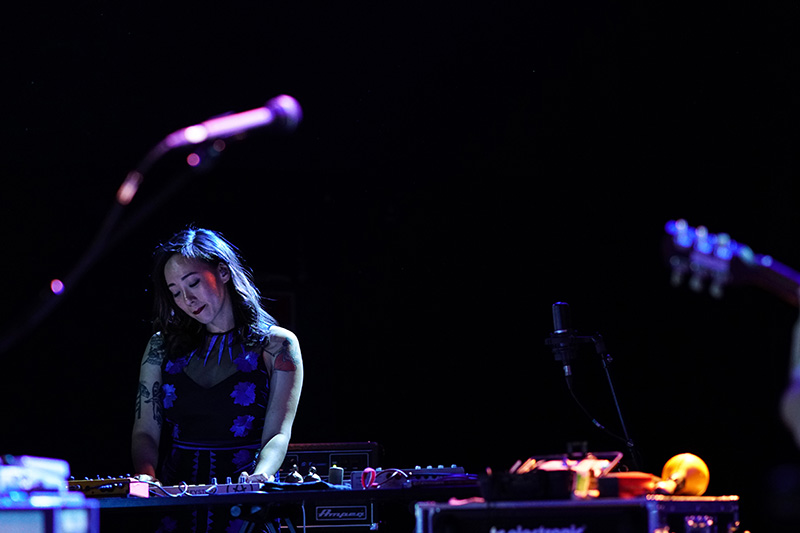
Xiu Xiu members Jamie Stewart, Angela Seo in Aarhus, Denmark, 2017

In 2010, Xiu Xiu left Kill Rock Stars and signed with both Bella Union and Polyvinyl. Xiu Xiu released Always on these new labels on February 28, 2012. It was called "magnificent" and given 5 stars by The Independent and given a 9/10 by Drowned in Sound. Xiu Xiu also released a split single with Dirty Beaches as well as a split LP with Chad VanGaalen in 2012.

On April 23, 2013, Stewart and Eugene Robinson of Oxbow released the collaborative album Xiu Xiu & Eugene S. Robinson Present: Sal Mineo on Important Records after having toured Europe together in February to promote the project.

In an email sent to fans on January 28, 2013, Xiu Xiu announced that "Ches Smith, Mary Halvorson, Tim Berne, Tony Malaby, Andrea Parkins and Jamie Stewart just finished recording an album in NYC of free jazz and art song versions of all Nina Simone songs". The album, Nina, was released on Graveface Records on December 3, 2013.

In the same email, Xiu Xiu also announced that a new Xiu Xiu album was being made. Xiu Xiu said that it is possible that it will be named Angel Guts: Red Classroom and that "it will be a mean, tight hearted, blackness of Neubauten vs Suicide vs Nico." Angel Guts: Red Classroom was released on February 4, 2014. It was given an 8 out of 10 by Drowned in Sound and Mojo. David Hartley of The War on Drugs praised the album, calling it a "stereoscopic assault".

In June 2015, Xiu Xiu started a new Bandcamp page under the title "xiuxiu69". Since its creation, they have self-described the page as an "ephemera shoppe specializing in exclusive, obscure, out of print, experimental & overlooked zonk". The page is used to host projects such as non-studio Xiu Xiu releases, solo Jamie Stewart albums, ambient projects, out of print Xiu Xiu collaborations and recordings from Jamie Stewart's former band Ten In The Swear Jar. Xiuxiu69 also hosts sales of physical music and merchandise, including LPs of Xiu Xiu material and material loosely related to Xiu Xiu such as Jamie Stewart and Lawrence English's band HEXA.

On November 16, 2016, the band announced their next album Forget, which eventually released on February 24, 2017. The announcement was accompanied with lead single "Wondering", signifying a return to more pop-oriented songwriting.

=== 2017–2024: Girl with Basket of Fruit to 13" Frank Beltrame Italian Stiletto with Bison Horn Grips ===
In May 2018, Xiu Xiu performed a long piece, "Deforms the Unborn", at the Guggenheim Museum in New York City based on the demonic possession of children. The following year, the band released their eleventh album titled Girl with Basket of Fruit on February 8, 2019, via Polyvinyl. The first single released for the album, "Scisssssssors", was released alongside its music video which featured, "dark rituals in different contexts... It deals with themes and references of ritual, mythology, mundane and divergent belief, film, music, and resurrected motifs from preceding Xiu Xiu videos".

Their twelfth album, Oh No, was released on March 26, 2021. Its lead single, "A Bottle of Rum", featuring Liz Harris (Grouper), was released along with the album's announcement on January 27, 2021. Its second single, "Rumpus Room", featuring Liars, was released on March 4, 2021.

"Maybae Baeby", the first single from the band's thirteenth studio album Ignore Grief, was released on January 12, 2023. The album featured new member David Kendrick, formerly of Sparks and Devo and was released on March 3, 2023. Before the album's release, the band described the album's genres saying, “Half of the songs are experimental industrial. Half of the songs are experimental modern classical”.

Their fourteenth album, 13" Frank Beltrame Italian Stiletto with Bison Horn Grips, was announced on June 25, 2024 and released on September 27. The band toured North America and Europe from September to November 2024.

=== 2024–present: Xiu Mutha Fuckin' Xiu: Vol 1 and Eraserhead Xiu Xiu ===
In July 2025, Xiu Xiu pulled their music catalogue from Spotify alongside bands Deerhoof and King Gizzard & the Lizard Wizard saying "Spotify uses music money to invest in AI war drones".

Their third cover album, Xiu Mutha Fuckin' Xiu: Vol. 1, was released on January 16, 2026. The album is a collection of covers originally released through the band's Bandcamp subscription service beginning in 2020. Months later, on May 19, 2026, the band released a rendition of "In Heaven" as a single for their album Eraserhead Xiu Xiu, inspired by the film Eraserhead which released on July 10, 2026.

== Band members ==
Current members

- Jamie Stewart – production, vocals, percussion, guitar, synthesizers, keyboards, piano, programming, bass, organ, harmonium, viola (2002–present)
- Angela Seo – production, vocals, percussion, piano, synthesizers, programming, organ, harmonium (2009–present)
- David Kendrick – production, drums, percussion (2022–present)

Former members

- Cory McCulloch – production, bass guitar, mandolin, synthesizers (2002–2009)
- Lauren Andrews – synthesizers, keyboards, piano, percussion (2002–2004)
- Yvonne Chen – synthesizers, percussion, trumpet (2002–2003)
- Caralee McElroy – production, synthesizers, piano, harmonium, percussion, flute, vocals (2004–2009)
- Ches Smith – drums, percussion, synthesizers, vocals (2006–2018)
- Devra Hoff – double bass, bass guitar, acoustic bass (2008)
- Zac Pennington – multi-instrumentalist (2011)
- Marc Riordan – percussion (2012)
- Shayna Dunkelman – drums, vibraphone, synthesizers, percussion (2012–2017)
- Thor Harris – drums, percussion (2019)
- Christopher Pravdica – bass (2019)

== Musical style and influences ==
The band's name comes from the film Xiu Xiu: The Sent Down Girl. The band found its first tracks to match the "rotten realness" spirit of the film, "that sometimes life turns out with a worst possible case scenario". Stewart said Tracy Chapman's "Fast Car", which Xiu Xiu covered on A Promise, had a similar theme. The group have also been influenced by the music of Nina Simone, Krzysztof Penderecki, The Birthday Party and OMD.

Metro Silicon Valley's David Espinoza likened Stewart to an explorer charting new territories of sound in 2001 as he started Xiu Xiu. He compared Stewart's voice to a combination of Robert Smith's fragility and The Downward Spiral-era Trent Reznor's anger, and noted Stewart's deliberate and considered choices towards developing the band's tone in light of the disparate wackiness of the individual instruments.

Brandon Stosuy of Pitchfork noted a "continual poetic and romantic beauty" behind "the violence" in Stewart's lyrics. He wrote that the band inspired fandom of the kind where teenage girls ask for Stewart's autograph.

Stewart has added that the band was a product of San Jose pirate radio stations that played house, hi-NRG, freestyle, and techno, which Stewart considered unpretentious, plain, heartbroken, clear, and based around dancing away sadness. They said they wrote their first Xiu Xiu song after leaving a San Jose dance club alone on a Christmas night: "Xiu Xiu came from feeling stupid and lonely and then wanting to dance it away, but having the club and its music only magnify that stupid and lonely feeling." At the time of A Promise, Stewart said that they were influenced by gamelan and Japanese and Korean folk music, and had been listening to contemporary classical and "gay dance music".

=== Live performances ===
In 2003, Stewart told Pitchfork that the band's live shows were starkly different from the recorded material. They said this was largely due to the technical limitations of being able to reproduce the way it was recorded. In their live shows, the band increased the intensity of their loud rock parts, though Stewart reported their set to be half "louder, more dance-y stuff" and half "really quiet stuff". They said the latter was sometimes at odds with the type of venues they played.

== Discography ==
Studio albums

- Knife Play (2002)
- A Promise (2003)
- Fabulous Muscles (2004)
- La Forêt (2005)
- The Air Force (2006)
- Women as Lovers (2008)
- Dear God, I Hate Myself (2010)
- Always (2012)
- Angel Guts: Red Classroom (2014)
- Forget (2017)
- Girl with Basket of Fruit (2019)
- Oh No (2021)
- Ignore Grief (2023)
- 13" Frank Beltrame Italian Stiletto with Bison Horn Grips (2024)
- Xiu Mutha Fuckin' Xiu: Vol. 1 (2026)

Additional albums (covers, tributes and compilations)

- Fag Patrol (2003)
- Remixed & Covered (2007)
- Nina (2013)
- Plays the Music of Twin Peaks (2016)
- Eraserhead Xiu Xiu (2026)
