= Women as Lovers (album) =

Studio album by Xiu Xiu
- Released: January 29, 2008
- Genres: Art rock; experimental; post-punk
- Length: 43:27
- Label: Kill Rock Stars

Xiu Xiu chronology
Tu mi piaci (2006)	Women as Lovers (2008)	Dear God, I Hate Myself (2010)

Professional ratings
Aggregate scores
Source	Rating
Metacritic	77/100
Review scores
Source	Rating
AllMusic	4/5 stars
American Songwriter	4/5 stars
The A.V. Club	B+
Drowned in Sound	6/10
musicOMH	3.5/5 stars
Pitchfork	7.9/10
PopMatters	8/10
Tiny Mix Tapes	3/5 stars
Uncut	8/10
Under the Radar	8/10

Women as Lovers (stylised as women as LOVERS) is the sixth studio album by American avant-garde band Xiu Xiu. It was released on January 29, 2008, by Kill Rock Stars, and shares its title with the Martin Chalmers translation of Elfriede Jelinek's 1975 novel Die Liebhaberinnen.

Prior to its release, the album was reported to be "more approachable or communicative on a basic human level" than anything else the band has released. The first track, "I Do What I Want When I Want", was released on December 11 via Pitchfork Media's "Forkcast", and is also available free of charge from Kill Rock Stars' webstore.

The release through the iTunes Store includes seven exclusive bonus tracks, whilst 500 limited edition copies were packaged with a DVD called "What's Your Problem?", containing four tour films, 100 photos, and sixteen music videos.

== Track listing ==
All songs are written by Xiu Xiu, except "Under Pressure" written by Queen and David Bowie. "You Are Pregnant You, You Are Dead" contains additional lyrics by Angela Seo. All tracks are stylized in sentence case on the original release.

No.	Title	Length
1.	"I Do What I Want, When I Want"	3:12
2.	"In Lust You Can Hear the Axe Fall"	3:30
3.	"F.T.W."	2:56
4.	"No Friend Oh!"	3:48
5.	"Guantanamo Canto"	2:37
6.	"Under Pressure" (featuring Michael Gira)	3:30
7.	"Black Keyboard"	3:57
8.	"Master of the Bump (Kurt Stumbaugh, I Can Feel the Soil Falling Over My Head)"	3:55
9.	"You Are Pregnant You, You Are Dead"	2:16
10.	"The Leash"	2:15
11.	"Child at Arms"	2:52
12.	"Puff and Bunny"	2:51
13.	"White Nerd"	2:45
14.	"Gayle Lynn"	3:13
Total length:		43:27

iTunes Store bonus tracks
No.	Title	Length
1.	"From the Balcony to the Mud, Part 1"	0:44
2.	"Kitten Revolution"	5:40
3.	"There Are Two Men in a Red Mercedes Trying to Rape a Woman in My Parking Space"	3:34
4.	"Farther On (Traditional)"	3:35
5.	"Juarez"	4:27
6.	"From the Balcony to the Mud, Part 2"	0:30
7.	"Interview: An 11 Year Old Girl from the Ukraine Emailed These This Year, All Year"	11:18
Total length:		73:15
