= Jamie Stewart (American musician) =

American musician

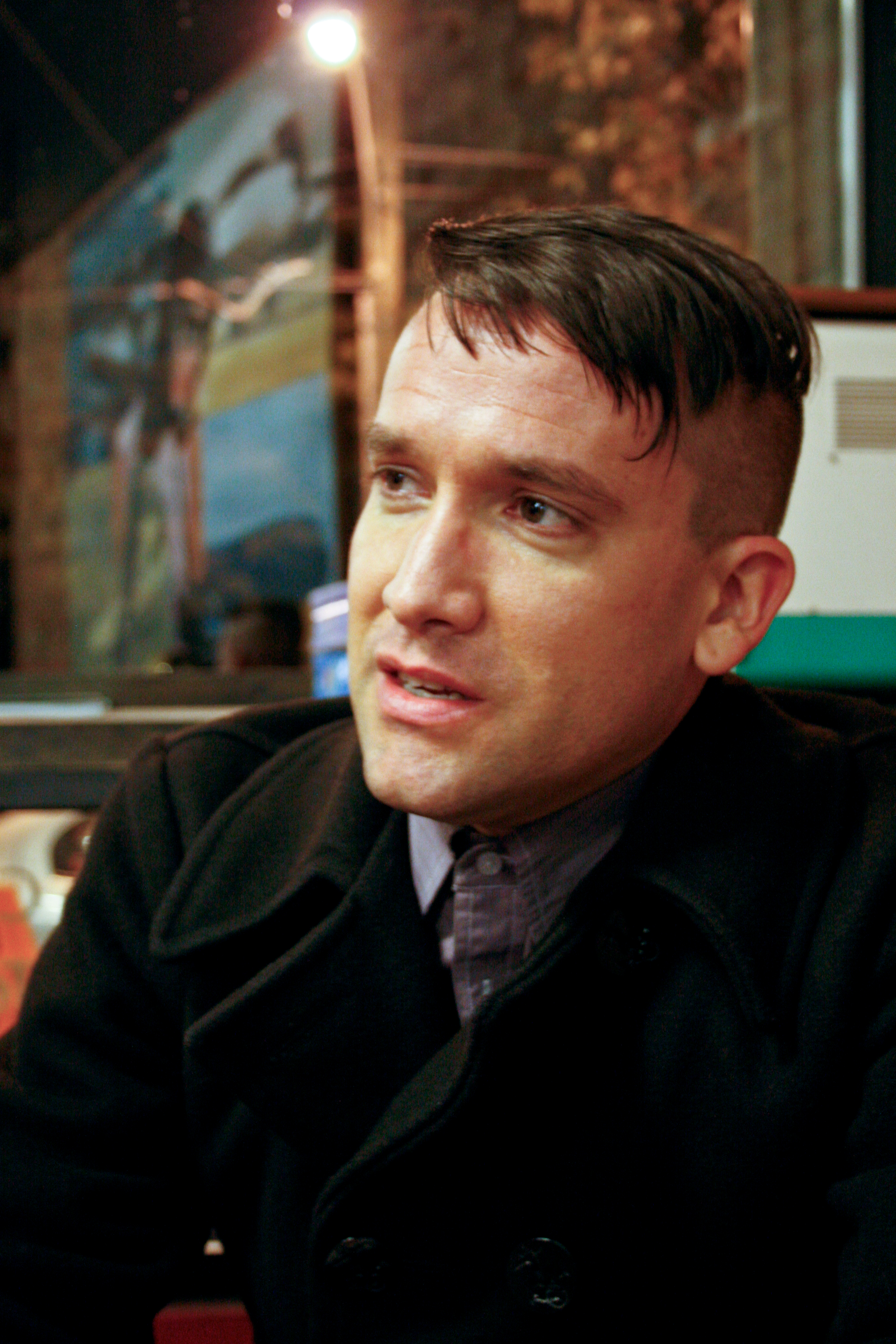
- Stewart in 2009 being interviewed for Former Ghosts.

Background information
- Also known as: Thee Fallings Out Brose; Butch Jenny Stewart
- Born: March 2, 1978 (age 48)
- Origin: Los Angeles, California
- Genres: Experimental rock; avant-pop; post-industrial
- Instruments: Vocals; keyboards; guitar; bass; drums; percussion; viola; harmonium
- Years active: 1996–present
- Member of: Xiu Xiu; Former Ghosts; XXL; Hexa
- Formerly of: Sal Mineo; Ten in the Swear Jar; IBOPA; Teen Plaque; Blue Water White Death; 7 Year Rabbit Cycle; Korea Girl

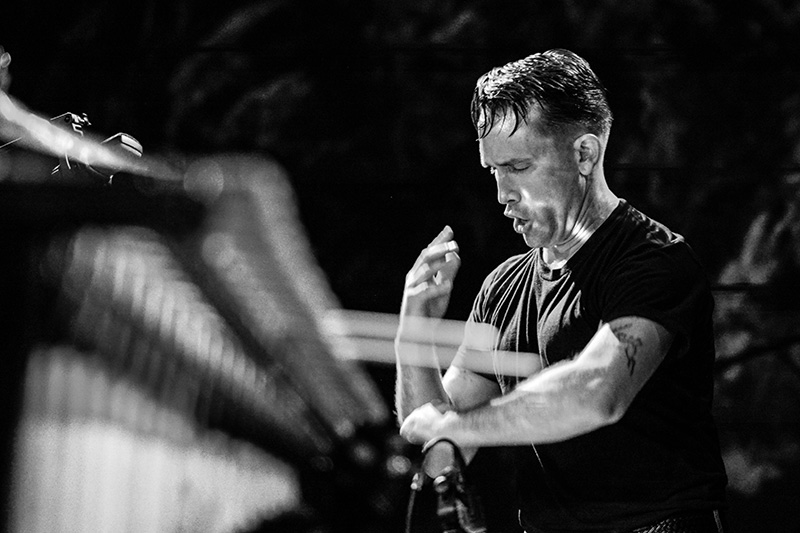
Stewart at Aarhus Festival 2017

James Stewart (born March 2, 1978) is an American musician and writer best known for their (Note: Stewart uses they/them pronouns.) role in experimental rock band Xiu Xiu. They have appeared in other bands, including XXL, Former Ghosts, and Sal Mineo.

== Early life and career ==
Stewart was born in 1978 to musician Michael Stewart and was raised in Los Angeles. Their favorite musical artists included electronic band Orchestral Manoeuvres in the Dark and composer Krzysztof Penderecki. Stewart was in several bands before Xiu Xiu; while in school, they played in a parody band and a Bauhaus cover band. After high school, they played bass in a group with guitarist Kenny Lyon and members from bands such as Devo, Geza X, The Screamers, and Sparks. Stewart has said that this experience was particularly formative for their career, but they did not realize this at the time. They later quit the band and moved home to attend college. During this period, they came out to their parents, although this was not received warmly.

Stewart on songwriting

At home, Stewart briefly played in several other bands before being kicked out, and a high school friend suggested that they start their own band, which became Indestructible Beat of Palo Alto (IBOPA). (Note: IBOPA is an acronym of the Indestructible Beat of Palo Alto, based on the film The Indestructible Beat of Soweto and the Bay Area suburb Palo Alto, where Stewart lived.) Their father also played in the band, and Stewart also played with Korea Girl during this period. Metro Silicon Valley described IBOPA as a collision of "dance, lounge, disco, and ska" with the horror of Red Asphalt, and noted the band for bringing attention to South Bay music. IBOPA was briefly signed to an Elektra Records subsidiary in 1999, and broke up in July 1999 when the label dropped most of its artists. (Note: IBOPA was signed to Elektra Records subsidiary Spongebath Records in April 1999 with plans to release three seven-inch records and a retrospective CD worldwide, but decided to fold three months later when Spongebath dropped the majority of its talent. Their last show was on July 4, 1999 at the Grand Fanali Presents Fourth of July Celebration.) The band announced that five of its members—Stewart, Cory McCulloch, Kurt Stumbaugh, Tim Kirby, and Don Dias—would continue into a new acoustic and experimental band called Ten in the Swear Jar.

Ten in the Swear Jar (abbreviated as XITSJ) continued IBOPA's "unusual approach" with eccentric and erratic music. (Note: Their debut album My Very Private Map was produced on CD and vinyl, and their next album, Inside the Computer Are All of My Feelings, was released on vinyl from Random Order Records.) Metro's David Espinoza described the band as "futuristic in instrumentation and erratic in mentality" with the traditional instrumentation backgrounded by baritone saxophones, banjos, accordions, and synthesizers. They added that the band's sound was minimalistic and that the unusual instruments were not used to excess. XITSJ members included Jason Albertini of Duster and Miya Osaki of The Chinkees and The Bruce Lee Band, as well as Don Dias, the namesake of Xiu Xiu's song "Don Diasco". XITSJ disbanded in September 2002 and Stewart formed Xiu Xiu.

== Xiu Xiu ==
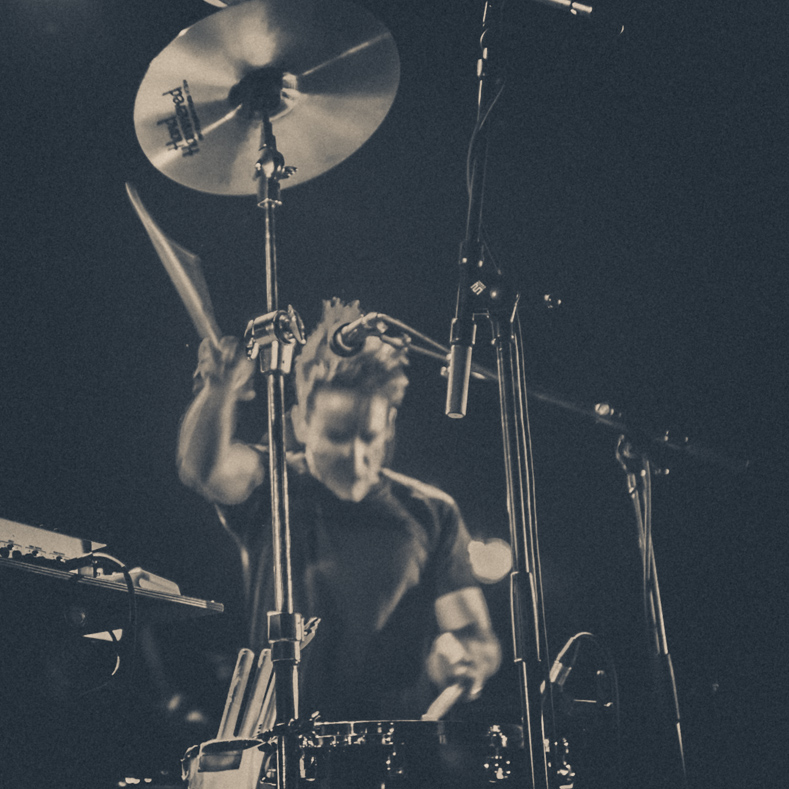
Stewart with Xiu Xiu in Nancy, France, May 9, 2008

Stewart started their third band, Xiu Xiu, with Cory McCullouch (from XITSJ), Yvonne Chen, and Lauren Andrews. The band forgoes traditional rock instruments for programmed drums, indigenous instruments, and others including harmonium, mandolin, brass bells, gongs, keyboards, and a cross between a guitarrón mexicano and a cello for bass. Metro Silicon Valley's David Espinoza likened Stewart to an explorer charting new territories of sound in 2001 as they started Xiu Xiu. He compared Stewart's voice to a combination of Robert Smith's in its fragility and The Downward Spiral-era Trent Reznor's in its anger, and noted Stewart's deliberate choice of tone in light of the individual instruments' disparate wackiness. The name Xiu Xiu, pronounced "shoe shoe", is taken from the titular character of the 1998 film Xiu Xiu: The Sent Down Girl. In Stewart's description, the film's theme is that of no resolution—that awful things happen to the protagonist throughout the film and she ultimately dies, tragically, at the end. The band found its first tracks to match the "rotten realness" spirit of the film, "that sometimes life turns out with a worst possible case scenario". Stewart said Tracy Chapman's "Fast Car", which Xiu Xiu covered on A Promise, had a similar theme.

Stewart visited Vietnam around 2001, where they took the picture that appears on the cover of A Promise. To afford the trip, they opened their equipment to local punk and ska bands as a recording studio. Stewart described the period between Knife Play and A Promise as full of "really bad things" in their personal life. In 2003, Stewart said that they have been very influenced by gamelan and Korean and Japanese folk music, and that they have been listening primarily to contemporary classical and "gay dance music".

Brandon Stosuy of Pitchfork said that Stewart, "one of underground music's consistently brilliant anomalies", "came into [their] own" on A Promise, and that their vocal style was compared with Robert Smith, Annie Lennox, and Michael McDonald. He noted a "continual poetic and romantic beauty" behind "the violence" in Stewart's lyrics.

The tone of 2004's Fabulous Muscles reflected an "incredibly, incredibly violent, incredibly jarring, and difficult to take" string of events in Stewart's life.

When interviewing for The Air Force in 2006, Stewart said that the year was "one of the first not dominated by personal tragedies", though the tone of the album reflects their experience internalizing the events of the previous years, which they felt was "almost more difficult".

== Other works ==
Stewart released an album with Eugene Robinson of Oxbow as Xiu Xiu & Eugene Robinson Present: Sal Mineo on Important Records in April 2013. They have also appeared in the album Christmas Island by Andrew Jackson Jihad. In addition, they have released an album with Jonathan Meiburg of Shearwater under the name Blue Water White Death.

Outside of music, Stewart said that they had written a "failed attempt" at a humorous novel based on "very, very peculiar sexual encounters" they had through their life. They wrote for two years ending in 2005, and circulated the book to friends. Among their favorite authors, they listed Yukio Mishima, Dennis Cooper, Charles Bukowski, and Kenzaburō Ōe.

They released their first book, a memoir titled Anything That Moves with UK-based publisher And Other Stories in April 2023.

== Personal life ==
Stewart is openly bisexual, has identified as queer, and uses they/them pronouns. They are the child of Michael Gassen Stewart, the half-sibling of sociologist Benjamin H. Bratton, and the "long-lost" cousin of former Xiu Xiu member and multi-instrumentalist Caralee McElroy. Their uncle is John Coburn Stewart.

Stewart's father and uncle were both musicians and songwriters: Michael was the co-founder and guitarist of 1960s folk-rock group We Five and a music producer. John was a former member of folk/pop music group The Kingston Trio, largely credited with helping launch the folk music revival of the late 1950s to the late 1960s, and later found success as a singer-songwriter; he is perhaps best known as the songwriter of The Monkees' 1967 No. 1 hit "Daydream Believer". "Mike", the closing track from Xiu Xiu's 2004 album Fabulous Muscles, concerns Jamie's reaction to their father's suicide in 2002.

Stewart has, on multiple occasions, referred to bandmate Angela Seo as their "best friend".

== See also ==
- Accordion Solo!
