= Fever 121614 =

Live album by Deerhoof
- Released: 27 November 2015
- Recorded: 16 December 2014
- Venue: FEVER, Tokyo
- Length: 37:30
- Label: Polyvinyl

Deerhoof chronology
La Isla Bonita (2014)	Fever 121614 (2015)	Balter/Saunier (2016)

Fever 121614 is a 2015 live album by Deerhoof. It received "generally favorable" reviews, according to review aggregator Metacritic.

== Track listing ==
No.	Title	Length
1.	"Exit Only" (from La Isla Bonita, 2014)	2:51
2.	"Paradise Girls" (from La Isla Bonita, 2014)	3:33
3.	"Let's Dance the Jet" (from Deerhoof vs. Evil, 2011)	2:47
4.	"Doom" (from La Isla Bonita, 2014)	3:18
5.	"Fresh Born" (from Offend Maggie, 2008)	3:17
6.	"We Do Parties" (from Breakup Song, 2012)	3:14
7.	"Buck and Judy" (from Offend Maggie, 2008)	3:26
8.	"Dummy Discards a Heart" (from Apple O', 2003)	3:01
9.	"Twin Killers" (from The Runners Four, 2005)	2:39
10.	"I Did Crimes for You" (from Deerhoof vs. Evil, 2011)	3:33
11.	"There's That Grin" (from Breakup Song, 2012)	3:11
12.	"Come See the Duck" (from Green Cosmos, 2005)	2:40
Total length:		37:30

Professional ratings
Aggregate scores
Source	Rating
Metacritic	77/100
Review scores
Source	Rating
AllMusic	3.5/5 stars
