= Friend Opportunity =

Studio album by Deerhoof
- Released: January 23, 2007
- Recorded: 2006
- Genre: Pop rock; experimental pop; avant-garde; art pop
- Length: 36:39
- Label: Kill Rock Stars; ATP; 5 Rue Christine
- Producer: Deerhoof

Deerhoof chronology
Untitled Deerhoof EP (2006)	Friend Opportunity (2007)	Offend Maggie (2008)

Professional ratings
Aggregate scores
Source	Rating
Metacritic	78/100
Review scores
Source	Rating
AllMusic	4.5/5 stars
The A.V. Club	A−
The Guardian	4/5 stars
Mojo	4/5 stars
MSN Music (Consumer Guide)	C+
NME	7/10
Pitchfork	8.9/10
Q	4/5 stars
Rolling Stone	4/5 stars
Spin	3.5/5 stars

Friend Opportunity is the ninth studio album by American experimental rock band Deerhoof. It was released on January 23, 2007, on Kill Rock Stars, ATP Recordings and 5 Rue Christine.

Twelve different front covers were designed for the album by the British artist David Shrigley.

== Composition ==
Friend shows Deerhoof shift into traditional pop rock, yielding a "pretty intricate [and] proggy" take on the genre. Along with experimental pop, it is also seen as a return to the "listener-friendly" avant-garde music that appeared on Apple O' and Milk Man.

== Track listing ==
No.	Title	Length
1.	"The Perfect Me"	2:40
2.	"+81"	3:03
3.	"Believe E.S.P."	3:07
4.	"The Galaxist"	2:40
5.	"Choco Fight"	3:01
6.	"Whither the Invisible Birds?"	2:11
7.	"Cast Off Crown"	2:47
8.	"Kidz Are So Small"	1:59
9.	"Matchbook Seeks Maniac"	3:23
10.	"Look Away"	11:45
Total length:		36:36

Limited edition 2011 Polyvinyl re-issue
No.	Title	Length
1.	"The Perfect Me"	2:40
2.	"Choco Fight"	3:00
3.	"+81"	3:04
4.	"Believe E.S.P"	3:07
5.	"The Galaxist"	2:42
6.	"Makko Shobu"	2:07
7.	"Matchbook Seeks Maniac"	3:20
8.	"Cast Off Crown"	2:48
9.	"Kidz Are So Small"	1:59
10.	"Whither the Invisible Birds?"	2:12
11.	"Look Away"	11:46
Total length:		38:45

== Personnel ==
- John Dieterich – guitar
- Satomi Matsuzaki – bass, vocals
- Greg Saunier – drums, vocals

== Charts ==
Chart (2007)	Peak position
US Heatseekers Albums (Billboard)	3
US Independent Albums (Billboard)	14
