= All Tomorrow's Parties (festival) =

UK music festival organisation

- Genre: Post-rock, indie rock, electronic, avant-garde, underground hip hop
- Locations: London, England
- Years active: 2001–2016
- Founders: Barry Hogan
- Website: atpfestival.com

All Tomorrow's Parties (ATP) was a London-based organisation based that promoted music festivals, concerts and records internationally between 2001 and 2016. It was founded by Barry Hogan in preparation for the first All Tomorrow's Parties Festival at Pontins, Camber Sands. Named after the song "All Tomorrow's Parties" by the Velvet Underground, the festival tended to programme post-rock, indie rock, avant-garde music, and underground hip hop musicians. It claimed to set itself apart from festivals like Reading or Glastonbury by staying intimate, non-corporate and fan-friendly.

== All Tomorrow's Parties Festival ==
=== Conception ===
The festival had its origins in the Bowlie Weekender, curated by Belle & Sebastian at Camber Sands in April 1999.

The festival was founded by Barry Hogan.

The festival was curated by a variety of musicians (and sometimes visual artists like Matt Groening, whose line-up featured in The Observer's list of the ten best festivals of the year, and Jake and Dinos Chapman), who would invite their favourite performers to play. The idea was that it was akin to dipping into the curator's record collection, or as Hogan described it, "ATP is like an excellent mix tape".

Most ATP festival events featured art exhibitions and cinema programmes (in the US, ATP collaborated with Criterion to present cinema highlighted by appearances from Paul Schrader and Jim Jarmusch), and others featured spoken word performances, stand-up comedy, and book clubs.

=== Festival locations and artists ===
The festival took place in the UK, US, Japan, Iceland and Australia, and was curated by the following artists: Broadcast, Deerhunter, TV on the Radio, Yeah Yeah Yeahs, the National, the Drones, Greg Dulli (Afghan Whigs), Jeff Mangum (Neutral Milk Hotel), Battles, Caribou, Les Savy Fav, Amos, Animal Collective, Godspeed You! Black Emperor, Jim Jarmusch, Pavement, the Flaming Lips, the Breeders, Nick Cave & the Bad Seeds, Mike Patton, Melvins, My Bloody Valentine, Explosions in the Sky, Pitchfork Media, Portishead, Psarantonis, Fennesz, Dirty Three, Thurston Moore, the Shins, Sleater-Kinney, Dinosaur Jr., Devendra Banhart, Mudhoney, the Mars Volta, Vincent Gallo, Slint, Swell, Jake & Dinos Chapman, Stephen Malkmus, Mogwai, Tortoise, Shellac, Stewart Lee, Sonic Youth, Boards of Canada, Autechre, Modest Mouse, Cowboy Junkies, and the Simpsons creator Matt Groening.

Performances at ATP festivals include the reformations of The Magic Band, Television, The Jesus Lizard, Sleep, and Slint amongst others. ATP also presented the return of My Bloody Valentine with a series of worldwide live performances throughout 2008, the London concerts of which were named Time Out London's Gig of the Year.

=== History ===
In 2001, the first All Tomorrow's Parties Festival was held at Pontins, Camber Sands. Mogwai curated the festival. Rock band Shellac was one of the bands Mogwai invited. Frontman Steve Albini praised the festival, saying "They completely changed the festival game. Now the whole world has to operate under the knowledge that there are these cool, curated festivals where everyone is treated well and the experience is a generally pleasant one." Since then, Shellac had a longstanding involvement with ATP and were often referred to as their 'House Band'. Shellac were the curators of ATP at Camber Sands, UK in 2002 and 2012, co-curated in 2004 and also played at several other editions of the festival including its final UK holiday camp event in 2013. Albini said:

We didn't like the cattle call nature of unrelated artists playing in an un-curated fashion. We established the precedent that we weren't gonna play festivals...Most festivals, there's a competition to get the biggest names as headliners, then everybody else was whoever was on tour, and then the bottom rungs were filled with payola spots where labels would pay to get people added to a bill. ATP was entirely curated. Somebody chose every single one of those bands because they thought they were awesome.

At first, the festival was sponsorship-free and the organisers and artists stayed in the same accommodation as the fans.

In 2002, ATP Festival expanded to the US, and several events took place there in subsequent years.

In 2007, the curators allowed festival-goers to pick the line-up by organising a voting process for all ticket holders in the months running up to the event. This was repeated in May 2009. The 2007 festival took place at Butlin's Minehead.

In 2008, ATP ran their first East Coast USA festival, which took place at Kutsher's Hotel and Country Club, Monticello, New York.

In January 2009, the festival took place for the first time in Australia, with events in Brisbane, Sydney and Mount Buller (in Victoria) all curated by Nick Cave & The Bad Seeds.

In 2009, Warp Films released a feature-length documentary about the festival named All Tomorrow's Parties. It premiered at the SXSW Film Festival, and then premiered in the UK at Edinburgh in June. In October 2009 the film was screened at a number of 'one night only' UK theatrical screenings also featuring live music from Les Savy Fav, who feature in the film and have long been mainstays of All Tomorrow's Parties line-ups.

In 2010, ATP announced "I'll Be Your Mirror", a series of events to take place in cities around the world named after the B-side to the original 1966 "All Tomorrow's Parties" single by the Velvet Underground. These events still involved a curator choosing all the music and films that play at the event, but without the holiday resort accommodation. The first event took place in Tokyo, Japan in February 2011.

In the years before 2013, when ATP announced they were ceasing to hold residential festivals in the UK, the festival took place up to three or four times a year in the UK (in May and then in December for the "Nightmare Before Christmas"). UK festivals were planned to recommence in 2015, moving to Pontins, Prestatyn.

== Record label ==
In 2001, the organisation created ATP Recordings, a record label originally formed to release compilation albums for its festivals. However, the label eventually moved on from just doing compilations for the festival to sign and release singles and albums from artists including Threnody Ensemble, Bardo Pond, The Magic Band, Deerhoof, White Out, Death Vessel, The Drones, Fursaxa, The Scientists, Apse, Fuck Buttons, Alexander Tucker, Sleepy Sun, Spiritualized, Built To Spill, Autolux, Tall Firs and Tennis.

At the end of 2007, ATP/R launched series of double 7" singles called Custom Made, which would feature bands choosing four songs; one something old, one something new, one something borrowed (a cover version) and one something blue (artists were free to interpret this as they feel). Artists who released singles in this series were The Drones, Alexander Tucker and Deerhoof.

== Other activities ==
In 2002, ATP became involved in booking stages at the Pitchfork Music Festival and the Primavera Sound Festival in Barcelona, Spain.

ATP also promoted concerts in London and the rest of the United Kingdom and curated the yearly Don't Look Back concert series.

== Company closure ==
In 2012, ATP was put into liquidation, owing £2.6 million to its creditors. The company's directors set up a new firm, Wilwall, but this also experienced difficulties, filing late accounts, incurring significant debts, and was subject to court judgements related to debt. A concert at Alexandra Palace from the rock band Grizzly Bear was cancelled, as was its urban festival, Jabberwocky, the latter only 3 days before the event was due to take place. A festival hosted by Drive Like Jehu was to be held in Prestatyn in Wales in 2016, but this was moved to Manchester in England, before being cancelled. A few months later the company went in administration, and its scheduled festival in Iceland was cancelled.

== See also ==
- List of electronic music festivals
- List of music festivals in the United Kingdom
- All Tomorrow's Parties, a 2009 documentary film
