= Reveille (album) =

Studio album by Deerhoof
- Released: June 4, 2002
- Genre: Art rock, noise pop, avant-garde, psychedelic pop
- Length: 33:36
- Label: Kill Rock Stars / 5 Rue Christine
- Producer: Jay and Ian Pellicci

Deerhoof chronology
Koalamagic (2001)	Reveille (2002)	Apple O' (2003)

Professional ratings
Review scores
Source	Rating
AllMusic	4/5 stars
Pitchfork	8.5/10
Stylus	B+

Reveille is the fifth album by American experimental rock band Deerhoof, released in 2002. The line-up of the band at the time was Satomi Matsuzaki, John Dieterich and Greg Saunier, with Chris Cooper contributing extra guitar work on one of the tracks. Satomi Matsuzaki also created the album's cover art. It was jointly released on the record labels 5 Rue Christine and Kill Rock Stars.

== Track listing ==
1. "Sound the Alarm" – 0:20
2. "This Magnificent Bird Will Rise" – 3:33
3. "The Eyebright Bugler" – 0:42
4. "Punch Buggy Valves" – 1:53
5. "No One Fed Me So I Stayed" – 0:47
6. "Our Angel's Ululu" – 1:42
7. "The Last Trumpeter Swan" – 8:11
8. "Top Tim Rubies" – 1:56
9. "Tuning a Stray" – 0:08
10. "Holy Night Fever" – 1:18
11. "All Rise" – 1:09
12. "Frenzied Handsome, Hello!" – 1:48
13. "Days & Nights in the Forest" – 3:59
14. "Hark the Umpire" – 1:19
15. "Cooper" – 2:04
16. "Hallelujah Chorus" – 2:45

== Personnel ==
- John Dieterich – guitar
- Satomi Matsuzaki – bass guitar and vocals
- Greg Saunier – drums and vocals
- Chris Cooper – guitar, only on "Cooper"
