= The Air Force =

Studio album by Xiu Xiu
- Released: September 12, 2006
- Genres: Art rock; experimental; post-punk
- Length: 34:37
- Label: 5 Rue Christine
- Producers: Caralee McElroy, Greg Saunier, Jamie Stewart

Xiu Xiu chronology
| La Forêt (2005) | The Air Force (2006) | Tu mi piaci (2006) |

Professional ratings
Aggregate scores
| Source | Rating |
|---|---|
| Metacritic | 76/100 |
Review scores
| Source | Rating |
| AllMusic | 4/5 stars |
| Cokemachineglow | 81% |
| Drowned in Sound | 8/10 |
| Los Angeles Times | 3/4 stars |
| Now | 4/5 stars |
| Pitchfork | 8.0/10 |
| PopMatters | 8/10 |
| Slant Magazine | 3.5/5 stars |
| Tiny Mix Tapes | 4/5 stars |
| Under the Radar | 8/10 |

The Air Force is the fifth studio album by Xiu Xiu. It was released on September 12, 2006, and was produced by Greg Saunier of Deerhoof, who also performs on the album with band members Caralee McElroy and Jamie Stewart.

== Production ==
The album was produced by Greg Saunier of Deerhoof, and released on 5 Rue Christine in September 2006. Stewart said that the year was "one of the first not dominated by personal tragedies" and that the album is about "making other people feel bad" instead of feeling bad oneself. Its major themes are "guilt and sex as opposed to sorrow and sex". Stewart considered it their best and most consciously pop album yet. They said that the band was obsessed with Weezer's Blue Album and The Smiths's The Queen Is Dead while on tour, though the album does not reflect those albums particularly.

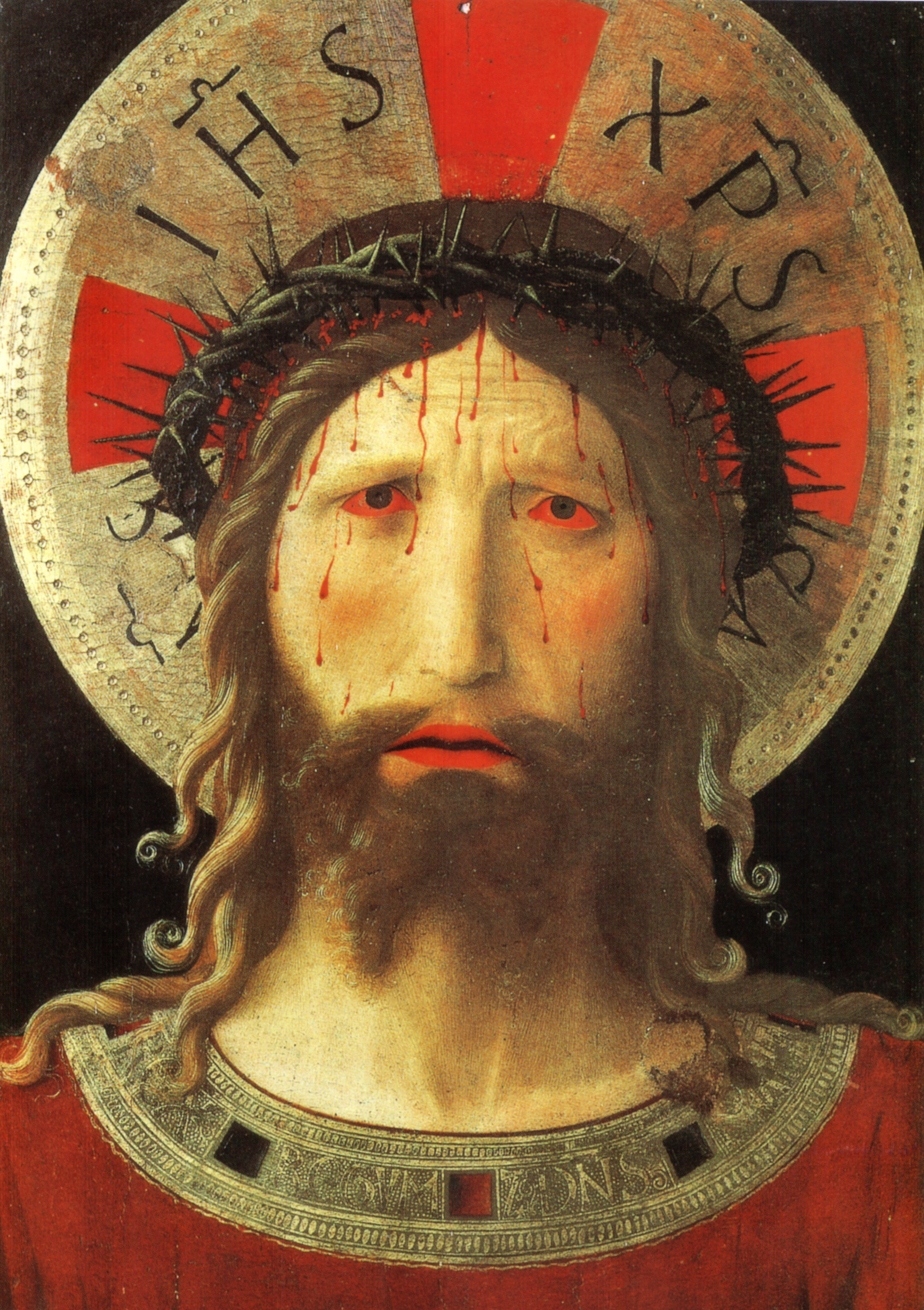
The album cover includes a tempera and gold leaf painting, Christ Crowned with Thorns, created between 1438 to 1439 by Florentine Renaissance painter, Fra Angelico.

== Track listing ==
All lyrics are written by Jamie Stewart, except "Bishop, CA" and "Wig Master", which have additional lyrics by Angela Seo who went on to formally join the band in 2009.

| No. | Title | Length |
|---|---|---|
| 1. | "Buzz Saw" | 3:01 |
| 2. | "Boy Soprano" | 3:23 |
| 3. | "Hello from Eau Claire" | 2:54 |
| 4. | "Vulture Piano" | 3:23 |
| 5. | "PJ in the Streets..." | 2:57 |
| 6. | "Bishop, CA" | 4:06 |
| 7. | "Saint Pedro Glue Stick" | 1:17 |
| 8. | "The Pineapple vs. the Watermelon" | 3:28 |
| 9. | "Save Me Save Me" | 2:39 |
| 10. | "The Fox & the Rabbit" | 3:12 |
| 11. | "Wig Master" | 4:17 |
| Total length: | | 34:37 |

iTunes Store bonus tracks
| No. | Title | Length |
|---|---|---|
| 1. | "Bonus Track" | 1:28 |
| 2. | "Feeding the Raging Heart" | 2:18 |
| 3. | "Bonus Track" | 1:13 |
| Total length: | | 39:36 |

Notes

- "Feeding the Raging Heart" is the opening song to the 2007 Robby Reis short film of the same name.
- "Hello from Eau Claire" and "Saint Pedro Glue Stick" do not have vocals by lead member Jamie Stewart; instead, Caralee McElroy does all of the vocals on the former, while the latter is instrumental.

== Personnel ==
=== Xiu Xiu ===
- Jamie Stewart - Production, vocals (1–6, 8–11), percussion (1, 3, 4, 6, 8, 9), drum programming (2–4, 6, 9, 10), synthesizer (2–4, 6, 8, 10), guitar (2, 4, 5, 8, 10), bass (4, 5, 8, 9), sampler (3, 5, 7), harmonica (4, 6), piano (1), accordion (2), recorder (2), autoharp (5), mandolin (9)
- Caralee McElroy - Production, vocals (1, 3, 6, 10), flute (2, 4), synthesizer (4), glockenspiel (9), cymbal (10)

=== Additional personnel ===
- Greg Saunier - Production, vocals (1, 3, 5, 6, 10), sampler (2–4, 9, 11), synthesizer (1, 4, 6, 9), guitar (2, 4, 5, 10), percussion (1, 2, 5), piano (1, 8), drum programming (2, 4), bass (3), electronic drums (3), banjo (6), bass drum (6), snare drum (9), glockenspiel (9)
- Devra Hoff - Double bass (2, 10, 11), bass (10)
- David Horvitz - Koto (7)
- Nedelle Torisi - Violin (9)
