= Future Teenage Cave Artists =

Studio album by Deerhoof
- Released: May 29, 2020
- Length: 36:26
- Label: Joyful Noise

Deerhoof chronology
Mountain Moves (2017)	Future Teenage Cave Artists (2020)	Love-Lore (2020)

Future Teenage Cave Artists is the sixteenth studio album by American experimental rock band Deerhoof. It was released on May 29, 2020 under Joyful Noise Recordings. A tour to support the release was scheduled for May and June 2020; however, these were rescheduled due to COVID-19.

Two singles from the album, "Future Teenage Cave Artists" and "The Loved One" were released on March 25, 2020. The third single, "Farewell Symphony", was released April 20, 2020.

Greg Saunier said in an August 2020 interview that a "sort of a sequel" to Future Teenage Cave Artists would be "coming out in a couple months".

== Critical reception ==
Professional ratings
Aggregate scores
Source	Rating
AnyDecentMusic?	7.7/10
Metacritic	79/100
Review scores
Source	Rating
AllMusic	4.5/5 stars
DIY	3.5/5 stars
Exclaim!	9/10
Loud and Quiet	9/10
MusicOMH	3.5/5 stars
NME	3.5/5 stars
Our Culture Mag	3.5/5 stars
Paste	7.3/10
Pitchfork	7.8/10
Tom Hull – on the Web	B+

Future Teenage Cave Artists was met with generally favorable reviews from critics. At Metacritic, which assigns a weighted average rating out of 100 to reviews from mainstream publications, the album received an average score of 79, based on 10 reviews.

Reviewing the album for AllMusic, Heather Phares opined that, "In Future Teenage Cave Artists, they explore what happens when that fight is lost. As Deerhoof dives into the messes that younger generations have to clean up, and art's role in the process, they sound rawer than they have in years. These songs are filled with intentionally frayed edges and jarring edits, as if they were created with whatever broken equipment the band could find after society collapsed." he concluded by claiming that, "the band's long-standing need to reflect and confront the world's problems, make Future Teenage Cave Artists remarkable proof that their experiments are as crucial as ever."

In the review for Exclaim!, Bryon Hayes claimed that, "Thematically, Future Teenage Cave Artists imagines a not-too-distant future in which our society's collective outpourings are seen as the cave art of a primitive civilization that has since decimated itself. While this all sounds rather bleak, there is a slightly unfinished essence in Future Teenage Cave Artists, indicating that perhaps society hasn't written its own death sentence; there is still hope."

Assessing the album for DIY, Nick Harris was less enthused by the album and the band's performance. He stated that, "They’re a band with a very definite foot (or hoof?) stuck in the past, everything they touch holding a vintage sheen of some kind, but it’s such a broad and masterful selection that there’s no sense of pastiche. The lyrics across the record let it down - they match the random patchwork of the sound, but take a step too far in the direction of gibberish for the most part."

Daniel Felsenthal of Pitchfork wrote, "...much of Future Teenage Cave Artists was recorded on laptops and phones, a tech-forward simplicity that reflects the album’s scrappy and cataclysmic milieu. It sounds less polished than their last couple of albums, but never as raw as their recently reissued early oeuvre...We’re left contemplating how a rock band, 26 years into their career, have managed to not only pin down the chaos of our time, but also to point toward our uncertain future."

== Track listing ==
Future Teenage Cave Artists track listing
No.	Title	Length
1.	"Future Teenage Cave Artists"	3:26
2.	"Sympathy for the Baby Boo"	2:23
3.	"The Loved One"	2:38
4.	"O Ye Saddle Babes"	3:32
5.	"New Orphan Asylum for Spirited Deerchildren"	3:56
6.	"Zazeet"	2:28
7.	"Fraction Anthem"	2:52
8.	"Farewell Symphony"	3:49
9.	"Reduced Guilt"	3:44
10.	"Damaged Eyes Squinting into the Beautiful Overhot Sun"	3:58
11.	"I Call on Thee"	3:17
Total length:		36:26
