= The Runners Four =

Studio album by Deerhoof
- Released: October 11, 2005
- Genre: Pop rock; art pop
- Length: 56:01
- Label: Kill Rock Stars; ATP; 5 Rue Christine; Children of Hoof
- Producer: Deerhoof

Deerhoof chronology
Green Cosmos (2005)	The Runners Four (2005)	Untitled Deerhoof EP (2006)

Professional ratings
Aggregate scores
Source	Rating
Metacritic	76/100
Review scores
Source	Rating
AllMusic	4.5/5 stars
Entertainment Weekly	B
Houston Chronicle	4/5
The Independent	4/5 stars
Mojo	4/5 stars
NME	7/10
Pitchfork	9.0/10
Rolling Stone	3.5/5 stars
Spin	B+
Uncut	3/5 stars

The Runners Four is the eighth studio album by American experimental rock band Deerhoof, released on October 11, 2005 by Kill Rock Stars, ATP Recordings and 5 Rue Christine. A vinyl edition with a different cover was released by the label Children of Hoof.

== Track listing ==
All tracks are written by Deerhoof.

No.	Title	Length
1.	"Chatterboxes"	2:32
2.	"Twin Killers"	2:16
3.	"Running Thoughts"	3:45
4.	"Vivid Cheek Love Song"	2:14
5.	"O'Malley, Former Underdog"	2:16
6.	"Odyssey"	2:55
7.	"Wrong Time Capsule"	2:52
8.	"Spirit Ditties of No Tone"	4:07
9.	"Scream Team"	2:40
10.	"You Can See"	3:20
11.	"Midnight Bicycle Mystery"	1:59
12.	"After Me the Deluge"	3:59
13.	"Siriustar"	4:37
14.	"Lemon and Little Lemon"	2:04
15.	"Lightning Rod, Run"	2:15
16.	"Bone-Dry"	2:15
17.	"News from a Bird"	1:23
18.	"Spy on You"	2:12
19.	"You're Our Two"	2:24
20.	"Rrrrrrright"	3:57
Total length:		56:01

== Personnel ==
- Chris Cohen – bass, vocals
- John Dieterich – guitar, vocals
- Satomi Matsuzaki – guitar, vocals
- Greg Saunier – drums, vocals

== Charts ==
Chart (2005)	Peak position
US Independent Albums (Billboard)	50
US Heatseekers Albums (Billboard)	46
