= The Magic (album) =

Studio album by Deerhoof
- Released: June 24, 2016
- Length: 40:18
- Label: Polyvinyl

Deerhoof chronology
Balter/Saunier (2016)	The Magic (2016)	Mountain Moves (2017)

The Magic is the fourteenth studio album by American experimental rock band Deerhoof, released in June 2016 through Polyvinyl.

== Production ==
In April 2016, Deerhoof announced The Magic, its first studio album since their 2014 La Isla Bonita.

Joseph Baughman created the music video for the album's "The Devil and his Anarchic Surrealist Retinue". Baughman described his style as a slow-motion improvisation. The clay animated video features chessboard pieces and multicolored minotaurs. Gary McQuiggin created the video for "Dispossessor", featuring Professor Raphael Appleblossom (eccentric alter ego of author Matthew Watkins) "demonstrating" the Banach-Tarski Paradox.

== Critical reception ==
Professional ratings
Aggregate scores
Source	Rating
Metacritic	79/100
Review scores
Source	Rating
AllMusic	3.5/5 stars
Pitchfork	6.9/10
Exclaim!	9/10

The album received "generally favorable" reviews, according to review aggregator Metacritic. Exclaim!'s Anna Alger was extremely positive, writing that the album "finds the wholly original and ever-engaging band at their most cohesive and versatile — which is saying a lot, given their dynamic history."

== Track listing ==
No.	Title	Length
1.	"The Devil and His Anarchic Surrealist Retinue"	3:14
2.	"Kafe Mania!"	2:43
3.	"That Ain't No Life to Me"	1:52
4.	"Life Is Suffering"	3:36
5.	"Criminals of the Dream"	5:00
6.	"Model Behavior"	2:35
7.	"Learning to Apologize Effectively"	3:15
8.	"Dispossessor"	2:09
9.	"I Don't Want to Set the World on Fire"	1:36
10.	"Acceptance Speech"	3:00
11.	"Patrasche Come Back"	0:47
12.	"Debut"	2:54
13.	"Plastic Thrills"	2:01
14.	"Little Hollywood"	2:56
15.	"Nurse Me"	2:41
Total length:		40:18
