= Balter/Saunier =

Studio album by Ensemble Dal Niente, Marcos Balter, and Deerhoof
- Released: April 29, 2016
- Length: 49:00
- Label: New Amsterdam

Ensemble Dal Niente chronology
Diligence is to Magic as Progress is to Flight (2014)	Balter/Saunier (2016)	Mikel Kuehn: Object Shadow (2016)

Deerhoof chronology
Fever 121614 (2014)	Balter/Saunier (2016)	The Magic (2016)

Professional ratings
Review scores
Source	Rating
Pitchfork	7.6/10
PopMatters	9/10 stars

Balter/Saunier is a 2016 album of a collaboration between orchestral Ensemble Dal Niente, composer Marcos Balter, and experimental rock band Deerhoof. The Boston Globe described the album as "arrestingly gorgeous".

== Track listing ==
All tracks are written by Marcos Balter except where noted. All tracks performed by Ensemble Dal Niente and Deerhoof, except the last two performed just by Ensemble Dal Niente.

No.	Title	Writer(s)	Length
1.	"meltDown Upshot - Credo"		4:48
2.	"meltDown Upshot - Parallel Spaces"		2:33
3.	"meltDown Upshot - Ready"		3:19
4.	"meltDown Upshot - True/False"		1:50
5.	"meltDown Upshot - Home"		3:51
6.	"meltDown Upshot - Cherubim"		2:42
7.	"meltDown Upshot - Rapture"		4:25
8.	"Pois Que Nada Que Dure, Ou Que Durando..."	Balter; Fernando Pessoa	4:52
9.	"Deerhoof Chamber Variations"	Saunier	20:40
Total length:			49:00
