= Dan Webb =

- Born: 13 August 1989 (age 37)
- Origin: Melbourne, Australia
- Genres: Avant-rock; alternative rock; psychedelic rock; jazz fusion; progressive pop; electronic; electro-jazz; post-punk; experimental
- Occupations: Musician; songwriter
- Instruments: Vocals; keyboard; guitar; piano; organ; keytar
- Years active: 2008–present
- Labels: Sungenre; Misdemeanor Records; MGM Distribution
- Website: danwebb.music

Dan Webb (born 13 August 1989) is an Australian musician, composer, songwriter, and producer.

== Career ==
Early in his music career, Webb garnered much attention for his energetic and partly improvised live shows. One of Webb's most notable stage antics at the time involved him playing his keyboard behind his back, in a style similar to Jimi Hendrix.

In 2011 he played five shows in a UK tour, played two sets at St Kilda Festival and supported Conway Savage. He headlined a tour of New Zealand in 2012 and performed at Newtown Festival in Wellington.

Webb released demos of twelve original songs for free download, one a month, from his official website in 2013. These songs were later developed and released on his 2014 studio album Sandstorm, which featured collaborations with Kylie Auldist, Bobby Flynn and actress Ashleigh Cummings. The first demo to be released, "Departure" featured Auldist on co-vocals and debuted on The Craig Charles Funk and Soul Show on BBC Radio 6 Music on 26 January 2013. Webb played seven shows in January and February 2013 on his most extensive Australian tour to date, before announcing an extended leave from live music performance.

In 2015, Webb released the four-track EP Sailing, describing its title track as "detuned psychedelic post-punk disco". It features his first recorded guitar solo, created by manipulating a detuned acoustic guitar in post-production to achieve an electric tone. Unlike his earlier collaborative studio releases, the EP was self-produced, mixed, and recorded largely in isolation in his bedroom, partly direct to analogue tape.

His 2017 avant-rock album Oedipus The King was recorded in the lead up to the 2016 US election and released on the same day as Donald Trump's Inauguration.

In 2019, Webb released Exotic Erotic Concoction, a fully instrumental electronic album whose tracks were named after various medications, with Webb describing it as a tongue-in-cheek thematic antidote to the political intensity of its predecessor.

His fourth album Sunshine/Dialogue was released on 9 June 2023, featuring an electro-jazz spoken-word collaboration with Greg Saunier of Deerhoof. Webb was nominated for Self Producing Artist of the Year at the 2024 Music Producer & Engineers' Guild (MPEG) of Australia Awards.

In 2026, Webb released "Hungry Ghosts", the first single from his fifth album Lion Dance, due for release on 13 November 2026.

== Musical style and critical reception ==
His early songwriting and production style was influenced by the Beatles and Stevie Wonder. By 2015 his sound had shifted toward a more guitar-led psychedelic style, with Webb citing Nick Cave, Blur and Bob Dylan as influences.

His 2017 album Oedipus The King drew comparisons to Miles Davis's Bitches Brew and David Bowie's Berlin Trilogy.

His 2023 album Sunshine/Dialogue received widespread critical acclaim and drew comparisons to Bonobo and Oneohtrix Point Never.

Singles from his 2026 album Lion Dance drew comparisons to Radiohead's In Rainbows, the electric period of Miles Davis, Mahavishnu Orchestra, Jimi Hendrix and Thundercat.

== Discography ==
=== Albums ===
- Sandstorm – Misdemeanor Records/MGM Distribution (May 2014)
- Oedipus The King – Sungenre (January 2017)
- Exotic Erotic Concoction – Independent (July 2019)
- Sunshine/Dialogue – Independent (June 2023)
- Lion Dance – Independent (November 2026)

=== EPs ===
- Capitulation – Independent (March 2009)
- Hyperspace Clearance – Independent/MGM Distribution (September 2010)
- Sailing – Misdemeanor Records (October 2015)

=== Singles ===
- Sleep (feat. Ashleigh Cummings) – Misdemeanor Records/MGM Distribution (February 2014)
- Coming Up Roses – Misdemeanor Records/MGM Distribution (June 2014)
- Drifter – Independent (February 2023)
- Europa – Independent (March 2023)
- A Good Song (feat. Greg Saunier) – Independent (March 2023)
- Hungry Ghosts (feat. Clive Deamer, Dennis Hamm, Bob Lanzetti) – Independent (June 2026)
- Things Rise and Fall (feat. Logan Kane) – Independent (August 2026)
