= Milk Man (Deerhoof album) =

Studio album by Deerhoof
- Released: March 9, 2004
- Genre: Noise rock; art pop; indie rock; avant-garde
- Length: 33:40
- Label: Kill Rock Stars; ATP Recordings; 5 Rue Christine
- Producer: Deerhoof

Deerhoof chronology
Apple O' (2003)	Milk Man (2004)	Bibidi Babidi Boo (2004)

Professional ratings
Aggregate scores
Source	Rating
Metacritic	74/100
Review scores
Source	Rating
Allmusic	4/5 stars
Pitchfork	7.6/10
Stylus Magazine	3.5/5 stars

Milk Man is the seventh album by American experimental rock band Deerhoof, released in 2004. It is something of a concept album, based on a character (the "Milk Man" shown on the cover of the album), created by Japanese artist Ken Kagami, a friend and onetime housemate of the band. The album was remastered and reissued in 2011 by ATP Recordings.

== Track listing ==
No.	Title	Length
1.	"Milk Man"	4:23
2.	"Giga Dance"	2:58
3.	"Desapareceré"	4:07
4.	"Rainbow Silhouette of the Milky Rain"	4:16
5.	"Dog on the Sidewalk"	1:13
6.	"C"	4:00
7.	"Milking"	3:36
8.	"Dream Wanderer's Tune"	2:19
9.	"Song of Sorn"	2:25
10.	"That Big Orange Sun Run Over Speed Light"	2:02
11.	"New Sneakers"	2:14

== Personnel ==
- Chris Cohen – guitar
- John Dieterich – guitar
- Satomi Matsuzaki – bass guitar, vocals
- Greg Saunier – drums, vocals
