= Miracle-Level =

Studio album by Deerhoof
- Released: March 31, 2023
- Recorded: June 25 to July 3, 2022
- Studio: No Fun Club, Winnipeg, Manitoba, Canada
- Genre: Experimental rock, indie rock
- Length: 35:51
- Language: Japanese
- Label: Joyful Noise Recordings

Deerhoof chronology
| Actually, You Can (2021) | Miracle-Level (2023) | Noble and Godlike in Ruin (2025) |

Miracle-Level is the nineteenth studio album by American experimental rock band Deerhoof. The album has received positive reviews from critics and is their first in 19 studio releases to be recorded in a studio with outside technical guidance as well as their first with lyrics exclusively sung in Japanese.

== Reception ==
Professional ratings
Aggregate scores
| Source | Rating |
|---|---|
| AnyDecentMusic? | 7.6/10 |
| Metacritic | 83/100 |
Review scores
| Source | Rating |
| AllMusic | 4/5 stars |
| The Irish Times | 4/5 stars |
| Loud and Quiet | 7/10 |
| Pitchfork | 7.9/10 |
| PopMatters | 8/10 |
| The Skinny | 4/5 stars |
| The Spill Magazine | 7/10 |
| Under the Radar | 8/10 |

Editors at AnyDecentMusic? rated this album a 7.6 out of 10, based on seven reviews. Miracle-Level received universal acclaim from critics as noted at review aggregator Metacritic. It has a weighted average score of 83 out of 100, based on eight reviews.

Editors at AllMusic rated this album 4 out of 5 stars, with critic Heather Phares writing that "nineteen albums into their career, Deerhoof still find new ways to express themselves" and that this album "is about seizing the opportunity to come together to create music and change—a message that, like their other 2020s work, is just as eternal as it is timely". Writing for the Associated Press, Jim Pollock compares this release to "a visit to an unfamiliar city", as "it feels anarchic and unstructured until the listener has some time to acclimate to its rules and norms". Siobhán Kane calls this release "delicate, trippy, grungy and wildly unpredictable" and rated it 4 out of 5 stars in The Irish Times. In Loud and Quiet, Jake Crossland scored this release a 7 out of 10 for "big-picture innovation, which just about filters down into the songs' smaller details".

Writing for Pitchfork, Marc Hogan gave Miracle-Level a 7.9 out of 10, writing that it "celebrates the heady euphoria that can result when skill and craft meet with serendipity and happy accidents, like a long-running indie band teaming up with the former owner of Lil Bub and hustling out a full album in two weeks' studio time". Jay Honeycomb of PopMatters rated it an 8 out of 10 for being "as vitalizing as it is soft-hearted". The Skinny's Joe Creely considers this release "an album where brevity belies what an enlivening and broad world it contains" and gave it 4 out of 5 stars. In The Spill Magazine, Joseph Mastel rated it a 7 out of 10, writing that the lyrics are weak and cautioning that "mainstream music listeners and audiences will likely not enjoy Miracle-Level that much", but he finds that "it is good to try new things" as the band does on this album. In Under the Radar, Kyle Kersey rates Miracle-Level an 8 out of 10, summing up his review that it is "a celebration of the human spirit, one that offers optimism and wonder in the face of pessimism and hopelessness. It's a little miracle in and of itself".

Editors at AllMusic included this on their list of favorite alternative and indie albums of 2023.

== Track listing ==
All songs written by Deerhoof

1. "Sit Down, Let Me Tell You a Story." – 2:06
2. "My Lovely Cat!" – 4:25
3. "The Poignant Melody" – 2:27
4. "Everybody, Marvel" – 4:09
5. "Jet‐Black Double‐Shield" – 1:54
6. "Miracle‐Level" – 3:14
7. "And the Moon Laughs" – 2:41
8. "The Little Maker" – 3:14
9. "Phase‐Out All Remaining Non‐Miracles by 2028" – 3:23
10. "Momentary Art of Soul!" – 5:07
11. "Wedding, March, Flower" – 3:11

The vinyl edition includes a second disc with the track "Demonhooftration".

== Personnel ==
Deerhoof

- John Dieterich – guitar, bass guitar on "Wedding, March, Flower"
- Satomi Matsuzaki – bass guitar, vocals, drums on "Wedding, March, Flower", lettering, liner notes
- Ed Rodriguez – guitar, drums on "Miracle-Level"
- Greg Saunier – drums, piano, organ, vocals

Additional personnel

- Mike Bridavsky – recording, mixing, mastering at Russian Recording, Bloomington, Indiana, United States
- First Regiment of the Zumiko Sakumura Brass Band – horns on "Phase-Out All Remaining Non-Miracles by 2028"
- J Riley Hill – assistant engineering
- Ryan Hover – graphic design, layout
- Kunie Sugiura – cover artwork

== See also ==
- List of 2023 albums
