= Noble and Godlike in Ruin =

Studio album by Deerhoof
- Released: April 25, 2025
- Genre: Experimental rock
- Length: 33:34
- Label: Joyful Noise

Deerhoof chronology
Miracle-Level (2023)	Noble and Godlike in Ruin (2025)	Divine Schism (2026)

Singles from Noble and Godlike in Ruin Album Review
- 1. "Sparrow Sparrow" / "Overrated Species Anyhow" Released: February 26, 2025; 2. "Immigrant Songs" Released: March 21, 2025; 3. "Under Rats" Released: April 9, 2025

Noble and Godlike in Ruin is the twentieth studio album by American experimental rock band Deerhoof. The album was self-produced by the band. The album title is taken from Mary Shelley's Frankenstein, reflecting the band's concept of "our low-budget, DIY Frankenstein: A sensitive, spurned, intelligent, dehumanized creature made out of people", described by drummer Greg Saunier. The album cover depicts a stitched collage of the band members' faces, reflecting this idea of a "Deerhoofstein".

== Composition and release ==
Noble and Godlike in Ruin is an experimental rock record with an abrasive and noisy style, featuring elements of math rock, disco-funk and heavy metal. It also combines classical music and free jazz influences, with tracks like "A Body of Mirrors" and "Who Do You Root For?" incorporating strings, brass, and processed vocals, as well as squawking saxophone and barbed guitars. It explores denser, more challenging musical territory compared to previous releases.

Lyrically, the album identifies with marginalized and oppressed figures, with songs addressing immigration and social exclusion. Our Culture Mag emphasizes that the album is politically charged, touching on themes of dehumanization and empathy. The lyrics of "Immigrant Songs" is about feeling alienated during the presidency of Donald Trump, ending the track with a raw outburst. Saunier explained that a theme on the album was, "If you're called non-human enough times, if you're called an animal enough times, well then, is there part of you that says, 'Okay, I'm an animal'? [...] And investigating what are the feelings that are triggered when you are repeatedly told that your life has less value." The album also has other, secret themes.

According to the band, the double single "Overrated Species Anyhow" and "Sparrow Sparrow" was released on February 26, 2025 and intended as a message of support for those marginalized by mainstream society. The single "Immigrant Songs" was premiered through Craigslist in March 21, a choice made to highlight a platform that, according to the band, "isn't blatantly supporting fascism". The song was made available through a series of "Services" posts on the platform, where the band advertised their availability for hire in various cities, including Brooklyn, Tucson, Portland, and Minneapolis. "Under Rats" is the last single released on April 9, featuring American rapper Saul Williams.

== Critical reception ==
Professional ratings
Aggregate scores
Source	Rating
AnyDecentMusic?	7.0/10
Metacritic	77/100
Review scores
Source	Rating
AllMusic	4/5 stars
Mojo	3/5 stars
Pitchfork	7.2/10
Record Collector	4/5 stars
Our Culture Mag	4/5 stars
Uncut	7/10

Noble and Godlike in Ruin has received acclaim from critics. At the review aggregator Metacritic, which assigns a weighted average rating out of 100 to reviews from mainstream critics, Noble and Godlike in Ruin received a rating of 77 out of 100 based on nine critic reviews, indicating "generally favorable" reviews.

Zach Schonfeld reviewing from Pitchfork described Noble and Godlike in Ruin as "coarse" and "raucous", noting that it remains "refreshingly immune to the staid professionalism" often associated with long-running bands, remarking that the record can feel "cluttered and dense". Kevin Harley, writing for Record Collector, said that it is a "radical assemblage of disparate parts", tightly bound by themes of "outsider resistance and empathy". Konstantinos Pappis, in his review for Our Culture Mag, describes the album as "humanly messy in a way that feels defiant" and "rather lovely". Drawing inspiration from Mary Shelley's Frankenstein, Pappis highlights the album's sensitivity, which resonates through its "mechanical" and "monstrous" sounds.

AllMusic's Heather Phares wrote that the album as "artfully jarring" and said that it is "political art of the highest order". Reviewed by James McNair from Mojo, described the album as "unpredictable" and "stylistically chameleonic". He noted that the band's sound, characterized by "clamorous noise" and "freak-out rifferama", was well-suited to the turbulent world of the 2020s. While acknowledging the album's intense exploration of political and societal issues, McNair found that it still exuded a sense of "invigorating abandon".

== Track listing ==
All tracks are written by Deerhoof; "Under Rats" written with Saul Williams.

No.	Title	Length
1.	"Overrated Species Anyhow"	2:13
2.	"Sparrow Sparrow"	2:26
3.	"Kingtoe"	2:22
4.	"Return of the Return of the Fire Trick Star"	2:35
5.	"A Body of Mirrors"	2:26
6.	"Ha, Ha Ha Ha, Haaa"	3:42
7.	"Disobedience"	5:01
8.	"Who Do You Root For?"	1:55
9.	"Under Rats"	3:48
10.	"Immigrant Songs"	7:00
Total length:		33:34

== Personnel ==
Credits adapted from the album's liner notes and Tidal.

=== Deerhoof ===
- Satomi Matsuzaki – performance, production, recording, mixing, mastering, face collage
- Ed Rodríguez – performance, production, recording, mixing, mastering
- John Dieterich – performance, production, recording, mixing, mastering
- Greg Saunier – performance, production, recording, mixing, mastering

=== Additional contributors ===
- Saul Williams – performance on "Under Rats"
- Satoru Eguchi – photography
- Ryan Hover – design, layout
