= Green Cosmos =

EP by Deerhoof
- Released: June 28, 2005
- Genre: Indie rock
- Length: 15:24
- Label: Toad/Menlo Park, ATP Recordings
- Producer: Deerhoof

Deerhoof chronology
Bibidi Babidi Boo (2004)	Green Cosmos (2005)	The Runners Four (2005)

Professional ratings
Review scores
Source	Rating
AllMusic	3.5/5 stars
Pitchfork	7.9/10
Stylus	B

Green Cosmos is a 2005 EP release by American experimental rock band Deerhoof.

== Track listing ==
Songwriting credits are adapted from the album's liner notes.

All lyrics are written by Satomi Matsuzaki, except where noted.

No.	Title	Lyrics	Music	Length
1.	"Come See the Duck"	Bobby Ray	Greg Saunier	1:06
2.	"Green Cosmos"		Saunier	3:24
3.	"Malalauma"		Chris Cohen	2:26
4.	"Spiral Golden Town"		Saunier	2:59
5.	"Hot Mint Air Balloon"	[instrumental]	Cohen	1:05
6.	"Koneko Kitten"	Matsuzaki; John Dieterich	Matsuzaki	2:10
7.	"Byun"		Matsuzaki; Dieterich	2:14
Total length:				15:24

Kill Rock Stars reissued the album on vinyl for Record Store Day in 2010. In addition to a revised track order, four bonus tracks were made available digitally.

2010 Reissue
No.	Title	Length
1.	"Green Cosmos"	3:24
2.	"Byun"	2:14
3.	"Hot Mint Air Balloon"	1:05
4.	"Koneko Kitten"	2:10
5.	"Come See the Duck"	1:06
6.	"Malalauma"	2:26
7.	"Spiral Golden Town"	2:59
8.	"Spiral Golden Town (Greg Demo)"	3:04
9.	"Hot Mint Air Balloon (Live 2004)"	1:50
10.	"Come See the Duck (Live 2005)"	1:30
11.	"Koneko Kitten (Rehearsal 2004)"	2:52
Total length:		24:40
