= Offend Maggie =

Studio album by Deerhoof
- Released: October 7, 2008
- Recorded: 2008
- Genre: Art pop
- Length: 43:21
- Label: Kill Rock Stars
- Producer: Deerhoof

Deerhoof chronology
Friend Opportunity (2007)	Offend Maggie (2008)	Deerhoof vs. Evil (2011)

Offend Maggie is the tenth studio album by American experimental rock band Deerhoof, released on October 7, 2008 by Kill Rock Stars. Over the summer the band put up sheet music for the song "Fresh Born" online, and invited fans to record their version. The title track is streaming on the label's website, while Wired is streaming short clips of various songs on the album.

The album was issued in the UK on October 13, 2008, via ATP Recordings.

== Critical reception ==
Professional ratings
Aggregate scores
Source	Rating
Metacritic	80/100
Review scores
Source	Rating
AllMusic	4/5 stars
InYourSpeakers	(mixed)
JustPressPlay	7/10
PopMatters	8/10
Pitchfork Media	7.6/10
Punknews	4/5 stars
Rolling Stone	3.5/5 stars
Stereo Subversion	8/10
The Big Issue	3/5 stars
This Is Fake DIY	8/10
Tiny Mix Tapes	3.5/5 stars

Reviews were generally positive, with most critics noting the band's move towards a more mature, guitar-oriented rock sound: "The album's all fretboard, no circuit board, and it feels most comfortable that way."

== Track listing ==
All songs written and composed by Ed Rodriguez, Greg Saunier, John Dieterich, and Satomi Matsuzaki.

=== CD ===
No.	Title	Length
1.	"The Tears and Music of Love"	3:58
2.	"Chandelier Searchlight"	3:31
3.	"Buck and Judy"	3:25
4.	"Snoopy Waves"	2:05
5.	"Offend Maggie"	2:02
6.	"Basket Ball Get Your Groove Back"	2:36
7.	"Don't Get Born"	0:49
8.	"My Purple Past"	3:49
9.	"Family of Others"	2:47
10.	"Fresh Born"	3:35
11.	"Eaguru Guru"	4:00
12.	"This Is God Speaking"	1:15
13.	"Numina O"	3:40
14.	"Jagged Fruit"	5:49
Total length:		43:21

=== Vinyl ===
Act 1
No.	Title	Length
1.	"Offend Maggie"	2:02
2.	"Fresh Born"	3:35
3.	"Chandelier Searchlight"	3:31
4.	"The Tears and Music of Love"	3:58
5.	"Buck and Judy"	3:25
6.	"Don't Get Born"	0:49
7.	"My Purple Past"	3:49
Total length:		21:09

Act 2
No.	Title	Length
1.	"Basket Ball Get Your Groove Back"	2:36
2.	"Numina O"	3:40
3.	"This is God Speaking"	1:15
4.	"Eaguru Guru"	4:00
5.	"Snoopy Waves"	2:05
6.	"Jagged Fruit"	5:49
7.	"Family of Others"	2:47
Total length:		22:12

=== Bandcamp ===
No.	Title	Length
1.	"Fresh Born"	3:35
2.	"Snoopy Waves"	2:05
3.	"This Is God Speaking"	1:15
4.	"Buck and Judy"	3:25
5.	"The Tears and Music of Love"	3:58
6.	"Offend Maggie"	2:02
7.	"Basket Ball Get Your Groove Back"	2:36
8.	"Family of Others"	2:47
9.	"My Purple Past"	3:49
10.	"Jagged Fruit"	5:49
11.	"Eaguru Guru"	4:00
12.	"Chandelier Searchlight"	3:31
13.	"Numina O"	3:40
14.	"Don't Get Born"	0:49
Total length:		43:21

== Personnel ==
- Deerhoof - production, mixing
- Ian Pellicci, Jay Pellicci - recording, vocals
- Eli Crews - recording
- Tomoo Gokita - art work
- Hodaka Hamada - design
