= We Sang, Therefore We Were =

Studio album by Greg Saunier
- Released: April 26, 2024
- Recorded: December 2023
- Genre: Progressive rock
- Length: 37:25
- Label: Joyful Noise
- Producer: Greg Saunier

Singles from We Sang, Therefore We Were
- 1. "Grow Like a Plant" Released: April 8, 2024

We Sang, Therefore We Were is the solo debut album of Deerhoof drummer Greg Saunier, released on April 26, 2024, by Joyful Noise Recordings. Saunier wrote, played, and recorded the whole album himself. It was preceded by one single.

== Background and recording ==
Per Saunier, he was convinced to make a solo record by his Deerhoof bandmates "as a way to cope with the restlessness I've been feeling", in conversations in early December 2023. Saunier started on the album soon after, and found that "With no one to please but myself, it came together way faster than usual. It was basically done by the holidays." Saunier wrote, played, and recorded the whole album himself.

== Release ==
We Sang, Therefore We Were was announced on April 8, 2024, with a release date set for April 26, by Joyful Noise Recordings. The announcement came with the release of lead single "Grow Like a Plant", which came with a music video featuring dancer Sophie Daws. The song was described by BrooklynVegan's Bill Pearis as "funky, skronky and glammy at the same time". On the song, Saunier said:

This song addresses that annoying quirk of the homosapien mind where it thinks it's made of higher quality molecules than the rest of the universe. For millennia civilizations managed to temper this suicidal arrogance with ritual. Until 500 years ago, when a handful of self-appointed experts invented the Enlightenment, proposing that men can solve any problem given enough brooding and/or physical violence; that the cosmos is actually nothing but an inert blob of matter for us to buy and sell. What if this is all wrong? What if it's humans who are really the mindless instinct-machines, competing for territory, food, and mates, and it's the plant and animal kingdoms that secretly know how to think and have fun?

== Style and influence ==
The album's sound doesn't differ significantly from Saunier's work with Deerhoof. Uncut's Piers Martin describes this sound as "intense prog futurism". The album switches between a variety of genres track-to-track, including funk-punk, Western swing, synth-grunge, and Latin pop. The song "Playing Tunes of Victory on the Instruments of Our Defeat" includes an orchestral section, described as "equal parts Appalachian Spring majesty and Merrie Melodies mischief."

At first intrigued by the Rolling Stones's 2023 album Hackney Diamonds being described as "angry", he was disappointed to find the album sounded "more like cotton candy than punk rock". Subsequently, he turned to Nirvana, saying that he "always loved the catchy melody over massive distortion, the way their songs refused to conform to simple major or minor scales, the dark sarcasm which still resonates in this age of phony blue-check-washing of fascism."

== Reception ==
We Sang, Therefore We Were ratings
Review scores
Source	Rating
AllMusic	3.5/5 stars
Uncut	6/10

BrooklynVegan's Bill Pearis wrote that "There's a little cotton candy [on the album] but it's tempered with lots of punk rock gravel." He highlighted moments where "'Rip the Atmosphere from the Wind' channel-flips from Brian Wilson to acid rippers" and "'Playing Tunes of Victory on the Instruments of Our Defeat' left turns from greasy funk into a full-blown symphonic composition worthy of Lincoln Center. AllMusic's Heather Phares said the album "may have been born out of restlessness and anger, but it's also a remarkably fun dispatch from one of indie music's most inventive musical minds." Uncut's Martin wrote that Saunier's "guitar and bass playing are rather more agricultural than his rhythm-keeping but this all adds to the character of his freestyle philosophising."

== Track listing ==
All tracks are written by Greg Saunier.

We Sang, Therefore We Were track listing
No.	Title	Length
1.	"There Were Rebels"	3:21
2.	"Front-load the Fun"	3:03
3.	"Yeah You, Person"	2:29
4.	"Don't Design Yourself This Way"	2:43
5.	"Furrowed Sugarloaf"	2:29
6.	"Rip the Atmosphere from the Wind"	2:59
7.	"Grow Like a Plant"	2:37
8.	"No One Displayed the Vigor Necessary to Avert Disaster's Approach"	2:25
9.	"Blame Yourself"	3:11
10.	"Instead of Queen"	2:34
11.	"Not for Mating, Not for Pleasure, Not for Territory"	2:45
12.	"Playing Tunes of Victory on the Instruments of Our Defeat"	6:49
Total length:		37:25

== Personnel ==
- Greg Saunier – vocals, all instruments, producer, recording, mixing, mastering
- Ryan Hover – cover art, layout
