= Bibidi Babidi Boo =

Live album by Deerhoof
- Released: October 3, 2004
- Genre: Indie music
- Length: 27:51
- Label: Kill Rock Stars

Deerhoof chronology
Milk Man (2004)	Bibidi Babidi Boo (2004)	Green Cosmos (2005)

Bibidi Babidi Boo is a live internet-only 2004 album released by Deerhoof.

== Track listing ==
No.	Title	Length
1.	"Dog on the Sidewalk" (recorded by Glass Shrimp at Resonance FM in London on March 31, 2004)	1:05
2.	"Dummy Discards a Heart" (recorded by Jack Francis at 12 Galaxies in San Francisco on May 8, 2004)	2:29
3.	"All Rise" (live)	1:12
4.	"Milking" (recorded by Jack Francis at 12 Galaxies in San Francisco on May 8, 2004 with Chris on bass)	4:01
5.	"Giga Dance" (recorded at BBC Peel Session in London on April 1, 2004 with Satomi on drums, Chris on bass, and Greg on guitar)	1:54
6.	"Wicca Wind" (live)	2:29
7.	"Flower" (recorded for Japanese national radio in Tokyo on March 24, 2004)	1:32
8.	"Satan" (live)	1:45
9.	"Desaparecere" (recorded at BBC Peel Session in London on April 1, 2004)	3:28
10.	"Rainbow Silhouette" (recorded by Chris Denman at XFM in London on March 31, 2004)	1:43
11.	"The Forbidden Fruits" (recorded for Swedish national radio at Emmaboda Festival on August 12, 2004)	2:05
12.	"Panda Panda Panda" (recorded by Chris Stubbs at WFMU in New York on April 29, 2003)	2:54
Total length:		26:33

Later revision
No.	Title	Length
1.	"Dummy Discards a Heart" (recorded by Jack Francis at 12 Galaxies in San Francisco on May 8, 2004)	2:29
2.	"Dog on the Sidewalk" (recorded by Glass Shrimp at Resonance FM in London on March 31, 2004)	1:05
3.	"Milking" (recorded by Jack Francis at 12 Galaxies in San Francisco on May 8, 2004 with Chris on bass)	4:01
4.	"Panda Panda Panda" (recorded by Chris Stubbs at WFMU in New York on April 29, 2003)	2:54
5.	"Giga Dance" (recorded at BBC Peel Session in London on April 1, 2004 with Satomi on drums, Chris on bass, and Greg on guitar)	1:54
6.	"Desaparecere" (recorded at BBC Peel Session in London on April 1, 2004)	3:28
7.	"Rainbow Silhouette" (recorded by Chris Denman at XFM in London on March 31, 2004)	1:43
8.	"Flower" (recorded for Japanese national radio in Tokyo on March 24, 2004)	1:32
9.	"The Forbidden Fruits" (recorded for Swedish national radio at Emmaboda Festival on August 12, 2004)	2:05
10.	"C" (recorded by Yuani Fragata for Canadian national radio in Montreal on August 21, 2003)	5:39
Total length:		26:45

10 year anniversary reissue
No.	Title	Length
1.	"Dummy Discards a Heart" (live)	2:29
2.	"Giga Dance" (live Satomi on drums+Greg on guitar)	1:54
3.	"Desaparecere" (live)	3:28
4.	"Rainbow Silhouette of the Milky Rain" (live)	1:43
5.	"Flower" (live)	1:32
6.	"Lose My Breath" (live My Bloody Valentine cover*)	2:47
7.	"Panda Panda Panda" (live)	2:54
8.	"Song of Sorn + The Forbidden Fruits" (live*)	3:32
9.	"Satan" (live)	1:45
10.	"Milking" (live)	4:01
11.	"Bendinin" (live*)	1:46
Total length:		27:44

Note: * Indicates tracks that did not appear on either 2004 release

== Personnel ==
- Chris Cohen – guitar
- John Dieterich – guitar
- Satomi Matsuzaki – bass guitar, vocals
- Greg Saunier – drums, vocals
