= Deerhoof vs. Evil =

Studio album by Deerhoof
- Released: January 25, 2011
- Recorded: 2010
- Genres: Indie rock, experimental rock
- Length: 32:45
- Labels: Polyvinyl (U.S. CD and vinyl); Joyful Noise (U.S. limited edition cassette); ATP Recordings (UK); Flying Nun (New Zealand); P-Vine (Japan)
- Producer: Deerhoof

Deerhoof chronology
Offend Maggie (2008)	Deerhoof vs. Evil (2011)	Breakup Song (2012)

Deerhoof vs. Evil is the eleventh studio album by American experimental rock band Deerhoof. It was released on January 6, 2011 on P-Vine Records in Japan, January 24, 2011 on ATP Recordings in the United Kingdom, January 25, 2011 on Polyvinyl in the USA, and January 30, 2011 on Flying Nun Records in New Zealand.

The band released the album one track at a time via different media outlets online, with a full map and schedule available on their own website. The first song released was "The Merry Barracks", which streamed on October 8, 2010, via the US website Pitchfork Media.

== Reception ==
Professional ratings
Aggregate scores
Source	Rating
Metacritic	77/100
Review scores
Source	Rating
Allmusic	4/5 stars
The A.V. Club	A−
Drowned in Sound	8/10 stars
Mojo	4/5 stars
NME	5/10 stars
Paste	9/10 stars
Rolling Stone	3.5/5 stars
Spin	3.5/5 stars
Tiny Mix Tapes	4/5 stars
Uncut	4/5 stars

Deerhoof vs. Evil currently holds a score of 77 on the music review aggregator Metacritic, indicating "generally favorable reviews". Awarding the album 4 out of 5 stars, AllMusic critic Heather Phares noted "[the album] is proof that, once again, Deerhoof can craft something fresh and different after so many albums. In their world, evil and boredom are practically the same thing, and Deerhoof vs. Evil triumphs against both".

== Track listing ==
All tracks are written by Ed Rodriguez, Greg Saunier, John Dieterich, and Satomi Matsuzaki, except where noted.

No.	Title	Length
1.	"Qui Dorm, Només Somia"	3:12
2.	"Behold a Marvel in the Darkness"	3:29
3.	"The Merry Barracks"	3:31
4.	"No One Asked to Dance"	2:16
5.	"Let's Dance the Jet" (Mikis Theodorakis)	1:36
6.	"Super Duper Rescue Heads!"	2:35
7.	"Must Fight Current"	2:53
8.	"Secret Mobilization"	3:03
9.	"Hey I Can"	2:13
10.	"C'Moon"	2:07
11.	"I Did Crimes for You"	3:09
12.	"Almost Everyone, Almost Always"	2:41
Total length:		32:45

iTunes deluxe edition bonus tracks
No.	Title	Length
13.	"Panda Panda Panda" (Live in New York)	3:46
14.	"You Can't Sit Down" (Live in New York)	1:59
15.	"Super Duper Rescue Heads !" (music video)	2:41
Total length:		41:11

== Personnel ==
- Deerhoof - performance, production
- Greg Saunier - mastering, mixing
- Matthew Goldman - design, art direction
- Sarah Cass - photography
