= Untitled Deerhoof EP =

untitled

EP by Deerhoof
- Released: May 22, 2006
- Genre: Indie rock
- Length: 22:38

Deerhoof chronology
The Runners Four (2005)	untitled (2006)	Friend Opportunity (2007)

Professional ratings
Review scores
Source	Rating
Pitchfork Media	7.3/10

The Untitled Deerhoof EP is an MP3 EP by the band Deerhoof, which was self-released in 2006.

== Track listing ==
All songs listed below are written by Deerhoof, unless otherwise noted.

1. "The Continuing Story of Bungalow Bill" (The Beatles cover) (John Lennon, Paul McCartney) – 2:07
2. "Desaparaceré" (Live) – 3:27
3. "Wrong Time Capsule" (Live) – 3:25
4. "Goin' Up the Country" (Canned Heat cover) (Alan Wilson, Henry Thomas) – 2:41
5. "Spirit Ditties of No Tone" (Live) – 2:28
6. "Lose My Breath" (My Bloody Valentine cover) (Kevin Shields, Bilinda Butcher) – 3:40
7. "Dinner for Two" (Live) – 1:09
8. "Scream Team"/"Lightning Rod, Run" (Live) – 2:24
9. "There's a Kind of Hush" (Herman's Hermits cover) (Les Reed, Geoff Stephens) – 1:17

== Personnel ==
- Chris Cohen – guitar
- John Dieterich – guitar
- Satomi Matsuzaki – bass guitar and vocals
- Greg Saunier – drums and vocals
