= Mountain Moves =

Studio album by Deerhoof
- Released: September 8, 2017
- Genre: Indie pop; art rock
- Length: 39:40
- Label: Joyful Noise
- Producer: Deerhoof, Children of Hoof Radio and Television Orchestra

Deerhoof chronology
The Magic (2016)	Mountain Moves (2017)	Future Teenage Cave Artists (2020)

Professional ratings
Aggregate scores
Source	Rating
Metacritic	78/100
Review scores
Source	Rating
AllMusic	4/5 stars
The A.V. Club	B
Exclaim!	8/10
Pitchfork	7.7/10
PopMatters	8/10
Spin	6/10

Mountain Moves is the fifteenth studio album by American experimental rock band Deerhoof. It was released on September 8, 2017, through Joyful Noise.

== Production and release ==
Deerhoof announced Mountain Moves in June 2017. The album was produced by Deerhoof along with the Children of Hoof Radio and Television Orchestra. Although the album was set for a September 8 release, the band made the album available on Bandcamp on August 28, with all the proceeds from purchases (before the official release) going to the Emergent Fund.

== Track listing ==
No.	Title	Length
1.	"Slow Motion Detonation" (featuring Juana Molina)	3:41
2.	"Con Sordino"	3:07
3.	"I Will Spite Survive" (featuring Jenn Wasner)	3:28
4.	"Come Down Here & Say That" (featuring Lætitia Sadier)	3:20
5.	"Gracias a la Vida" (Violeta Parra)	0:59
6.	"Begin Countdown"	2:09
7.	"Your Dystopic Creation Doesn't Fear You" (featuring Awkwafina)	2:55
8.	"Ay That's Me"	3:04
9.	"Palace of the Governors"	2:18
10.	"Singalong Junk" (featuring Xenia Rubinos)	3:32
11.	"Mountain Moves" (featuring Matana Roberts)	1:58
12.	"Freedom Highway" (The Staple Singers)	1:42
13.	"Sea Moves" (featuring Chad Popple and Devin Hoff)	1:58
14.	"Kokoye"	4:07
15.	"Small Axe" (Bob Marley)	1:20

== Charts ==
Chart (2017)	Peak position
New Zealand Heatseekers Albums (RMNZ)	10
