= Threnody Ensemble =

Experimental classical music trio

- Origin: California, United States
- Genres: Indie; Experimental; Classical
- Years active: 1997-present
- Label: ATP Recordings
- Members: Dave Cerf; Dominique Davison; Erik Hoversten
- Website: www.threnodyensemble.com

Threnody Ensemble are a three-piece experimental classical music group who formed in 1997, first as a two-piece made up of Dave Cerf and Erik Hoversten, but soon as a trio when cellist Dominique Davison joined a year later.

The band are unusual in that they are former rock musicians playing experimental music and recording for a classical music label, thus setting them apart from any particular music scene. Threnody Ensemble's music is neither strictly "classical" nor "popular"; it is both part composed and part improvised, part acoustic and part computer-generated. They fuse elements of non-Western musical traditions with their own contemporary compositions to create new hybrid forms. Their stated intent is to complicate traditional notions of musical identity and authenticity.

The word "threnody" means "lament."

== Biography ==
Though the group's material was originally based around the interaction between two acoustic guitars and a cello, the members decided to develop in a more fluid way with each project, and have since eliminated this structure entirely. The group members collaborate with a variety of musicians from disparate musical traditions and assemble different groups for each tour or project.

The Ensemble's core members come from diverse musical backgrounds. Erik Hoversten studied ethnomusicology and composition at the University of California, Berkeley, focusing on Javanese, Balinese, Korean, Indian, and Ghanaian traditions. He played in the noted San Francisco math rock band A Minor Forest from 1993–1998 and later did graduate work in music at the University of California, San Diego.

Dave Cerf studied film as well as West African, Indonesian, and Indian music at California Institute of the Arts. He was a member of the Washington D.C. based group Lorelei and played in numerous heavy metal bands. In addition to his musical activities, Dave has been active in photography, film and video, and radio drama. Cerf and Hoversten have supposedly been collaborating since they were three years old, and have now been making music together for over 25 years.

Dominique Davison has performed in orchestras since childhood. She played bass in the punk band Spitboy and later she met Hoversten while playing cello in A Minor Forest and New York's 33.3. She is an architect.

The debut album by Threnody Ensemble, Timbre Hollow, was produced by Brian Paulson, and took a number of years to be finished. During the process of recording the album the trio was expanded to include cellist Amy Domingues. As well as Domingues, the album would also feature supplementary musicians playing piano, contrabass, clarinet, and percussion. It was finally released on the classical based New Albion label in 2000, to some critical acclaim, Mark Athitakis of SF Weekly stated that "it's one of the most remarkably giving, accessible, and simply beautiful records to come from these parts in some time. Neither rigidly chamber pop nor wildly experimental, its spare, slow, organic sound is utterly entrancing." Two years later was given a European release on the All Tomorrow's Parties-affiliated ATP Recordings.

Members of Threnody Ensemble have also composed music for soundtracks, including Sam Green's documentary The Weather Underground, and Scott Hamilton Kennedy's OT: Our Town.

In the live arena the band have toured with The Sea And Cake, The Mountain Goats, Pinback, Nina Nastasia and The Black Heart Procession. They have also appeared at two All Tomorrow's Parties festivals, in 2002 and 2004 respectively, where they were asked to play by festival curators Shellac and Sonic Youth.

== Discography ==
=== Album ===
- Timbre Hollow (New Albion/ATPR, 2000/2002)

=== Other ===
- All Tomorrow's Parties 2002 UK - hosted by Shellac (compilation) (ATPR, 2002) - contribute track 5: Groups
