= Apple O' =

Studio album by Deerhoof
- Released: March 18, 2003
- Genres: Experimental; noise pop; indie pop; art pop; avant-garde
- Length: 31:16
- Label: Kill Rock Stars / 5 Rue Christine
- Producer: Jay Pellicci

Deerhoof chronology
Reveille (2002)	Apple O' (2003)	Milk Man (2004)

Apple O' is the sixth studio album by American experimental rock band Deerhoof. It was released in 2003 on Kill Rock Stars and 5 Rue Christine, an offshoot of Kill Rock Stars. The album is the group's first with guitarist Chris Cohen.

The 2013 LP version of the album contains a modified track listing.

== Composition ==
The musical style of Apple O' is seen as experimental noise pop. However, it has also been noted for having more in common with a "typical jangly" indie pop album.

Bebop, dance, 1950s doo-wop, jangle pop, and jazz sounds all show up across the album as well.

== Critical reception ==
Professional ratings
Review scores
Source	Rating
AllMusic	4/5 stars
Mojo	4/5 stars
Pitchfork	8.3/10
Tiny Mix Tapes	3.5/5 marks

The record was released to positive assessments from music critics. Eric Carr for Pitchfork applauded it, calling it "a fascinating trip" and positively noted its "intense variety and sparklingly consistent pop songwriting". It received the website's "Best New Music" accolade.

=== Accolades ===
==== Year-end lists ====
Publication	List	Rank	Ref.
Pitchfork	Top 50 Albums of 2003	16	

==== Decade-end lists ====
Publication	List	Rank	Ref.
Pitchfork	The 200 Best Albums of the 2000s	199	

== Track listing ==
Songwriting credits are adapted from Bandcamp.

No.	Title	Lyrics	Music	Length
1.	"Dummy Discards a Heart"	Greg Saunier	Saunier; Satomi Matsuzaki	2:39
2.	"Heart Failure"	Saunier; Matsuzaki	Saunier	1:30
3.	"Sealed with a Kiss"	Saunier	Saunier; Matsuzaki	3:34
4.	"Flower"	Saunier; Matsuzaki	John Dieterich	1:47
5.	"My Diamond Star Car"		Saunier	1:32
6.	"Apple Bomb"	Saunier	Saunier; Dieterich	4:14
7.	"The Forbidden Fruits"	Matsuzaki	Matsuzaki; Chris Cohen	2:30
8.	"L'Amour Stories"	Saunier; Matsuzaki	Saunier	2:42
9.	"Dinner for Two"	Saunier; Matsuzaki	Saunier; Matsuzaki	1:16
10.	"Panda Panda Panda"	Matsuzaki	Matsuzaki; Cohen	2:41
11.	"Hayley and Homer"		Dieterich	1:11
12.	"Adam + Eve Connection"	Saunier; Matsuzaki	Saunier	3:03
13.	"Blue Cash"	Saunier; Matsuzaki	Saunier	2:37

2013 Vinyl Reissue
No.	Title	Lyrics	Music	Length
1.	"Dummy Discards a Heart"	Saunier	Saunier; Matsuzaki	2:39
2.	"My Diamond Star Car"		Saunier	1:32
3.	"Heart Failure"	Saunier; Matsuzaki	Saunier	1:30
4.	"Panda Panda Panda"	Matsuzaki	Matsuzaki; Cohen	2:41
5.	"Apple Bomb"	Saunier	Saunier; Dieterich	4:14
6.	"Flower"	Saunier; Matsuzaki	Dieterich	1:47
7.	"Sealed with a Kiss"	Saunier	Saunier; Matsuzaki	3:34
8.	"L'Amour Stories"	Saunier; Matsuzaki	Saunier	2:42
9.	"Hayley and Homer"		Dieterich	1:11
10.	"Dinner for Two"	Saunier; Matsuzaki	Saunier; Matsuzaki	1:16
11.	"The Forbidden Fruits"	Matsuzaki	Matsuzaki; Cohen	2:30
12.	"Adam + Eve Connection"	Saunier; Matsuzaki	Saunier	3:03
13.	"Blue Cash"	Saunier; Matsuzaki	Saunier	2:37

2023 Vinyl Reissue bonus 7"
No.	Title	Length
1.	"Dummy Discards a Heart (Live 2003)"	2:30
2.	"The Forbidden Fruits (Chris Demo)"	1:49
3.	"Panda Panda Panda (First Performance 2002)"	2:40
4.	"My Diamond Star Car (Live 2002)"	1:44

== Personnel ==
Deerhoof

- Chris Cohen – guitar
- John Dieterich – guitar
- Satomi Matsuzaki – bass guitar and vocals
- Greg Saunier – drums and vocals
