= Actually, You Can =

Studio album by Deerhoof
- Released: October 22, 2021
- Length: 32:16
- Label: Joyful Noise Recordings

Deerhoof chronology
Love-Lore (2020)	Actually, You Can (2021)	Miracle-Level (2023)

Professional ratings
Aggregate scores
Source	Rating
Metacritic	75/100
Review scores
Source	Rating
AllMusic	4/5 stars
DIY	3.5/5 stars
The Line of Best Fit	7/10
Mojo	3/5 stars
Paste	8.3/10
Pitchfork	7.3/10
The Quietus	4/5 stars

Actually, You Can is the eighteenth studio album by the experimental rock band Deerhoof.

== Composition and release ==
"Department of Corrections" was released as the album's first single. Guitarist Ed Rodriguez said that "Scarcity is Manufactured," which was also released as a single, was inspired by the "declaration of Mexican pride" in Ritchie Valens' version of La Bamba and by how fan responses at Deerhoof shows helped Rodriguez accept and celebrate his Mexican heritage.

== Track listing ==
Actually, You Can track listing
No.	Title	Length
1.	"Be Unbarred, O Ye Gates of Hell"	3:06
2.	"Department of Corrections"	3:21
3.	"We Grew, and We Are Astonished"	2:41
4.	"Scarcity is Manufactured"	2:53
5.	"Ancient Mysteries, Described"	3:37
6.	"Plant Thief"	3:13
7.	"Our Philosophy Is Fiction"	4:27
8.	"Epic Love Poem"	3:39
9.	"Divine Comedy"	5:16
Total length:		32:16
