= Nervous Cop =

Experimental rock album

Studio album by Nervous Cop
- Released: November 4, 2003
- Genres: Experimental rock, noise rock
- Length: 30:13
- Label: 5 Rue Christine

Professional ratings
Review scores
Source	Rating
AllMusic	3/5 stars
Pitchfork	6.6/10
Tiny Mix Tapes	2.5/5 stars

Nervous Cop is a 2003 experimental rock album by the group of the same name, consisting of drummer Greg Saunier and electronics musician John Dieterich of Deerhoof, drummer Zach Hill of Hella (later of Team Sleep and Death Grips) with harpist Joanna Newsom, released through 5 Rue Christine.

== Personnel ==
Musicians

- Zach Hill – drums
- Greg Saunier – drums
- Joanna Newsom – classical harp
- John Dieterich – electronics

Production

- Jay Pellicci – drum tracks recording engineer
- Carson McWhirter – harp track recording engineer
- Greg Saunier – mixing
- Allison Schmidt – photography
- Justin Stewart & Zach Hill – photo concepts and art direction
- Aaron Winters – graphic production

== Follow up ==
Nervous Cop reformed with a new lineup in 2017 to record an 18-minute self-titled piece which was released for download through CASH Music and as part of Deerhoof's limited edition vinyl box set for Joyful Noise Recordings' "artist in residence" program. Saunier, Dieterich and Hill returned without Newsom and were instead joined by long-time Deerhoof vocalist and bassist Satomi Matsuzaki, guitarist Ed Rodriguez who joined Deerhoof in 2008, and Andy Morin of Hill's newer group Death Grips.

== Track listing ==
The spelling of some track titles varies between sources. The titles below are spelled as they appear on the back cover of the original CD release.

No.	Title	Length
1.	"Setting the Bushes on Fire"	0:33
2.	"Rice Precipitation"	0:36
3.	"Nonrum Nonproblem"	1:06
4.	"Get Wolf Boy and Get in Context"	0:37
5.	"Ill Pearls"	4:14
6.	"Franks vs. Frank"	7:32
7.	"Colorchains of Inner Space"	2:59
8.	"Nuflesh, Old Thirst"	6:31
9.	"Pow Strikes Pow Implosion"	0:53
10.	"The Hawk Feeds You to Feed Itself"	5:12
Total length:		30:17
