= Fursaxa =

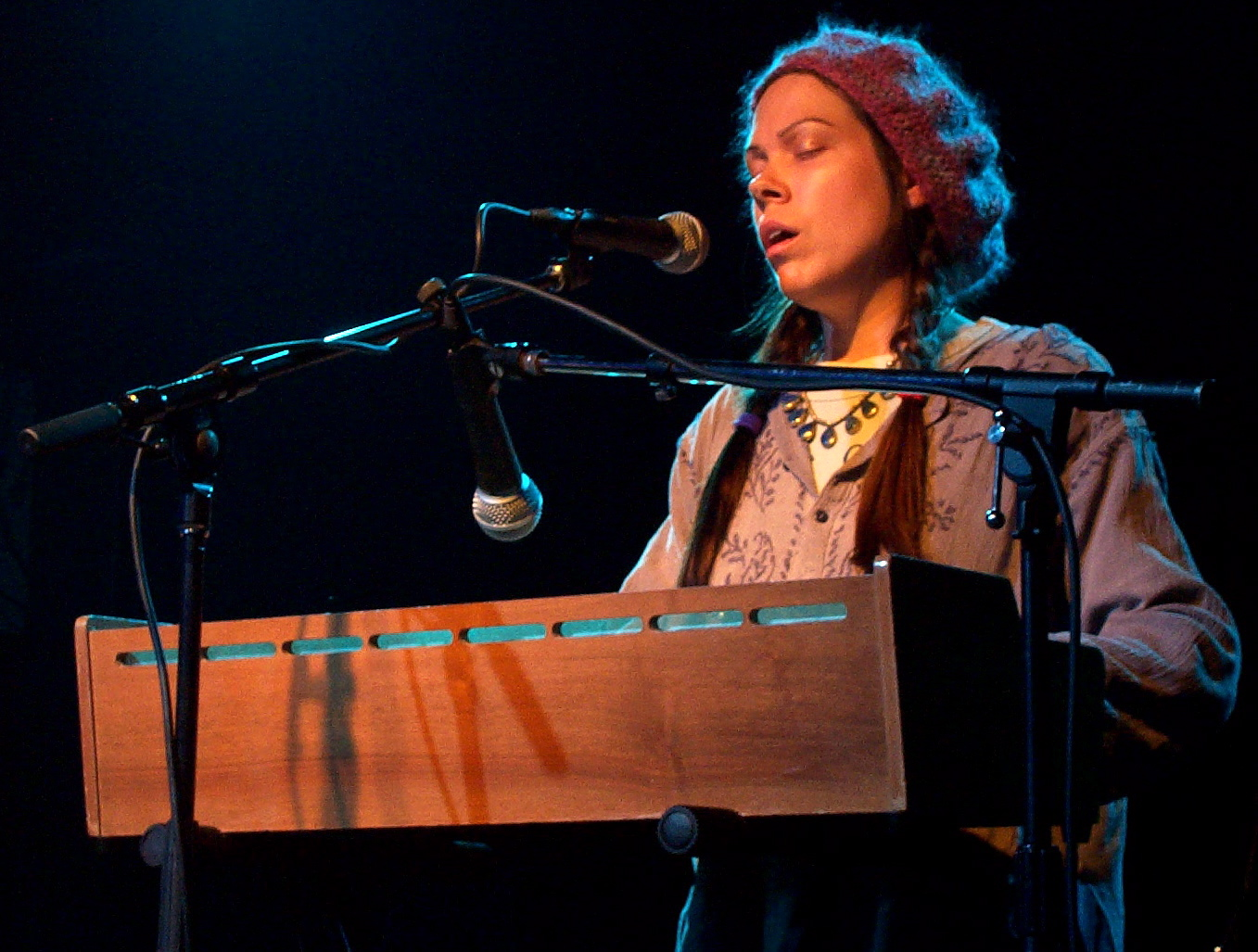
- Fursaxa performing in Minneapolis in 2003

Background information
- Also known as: Fursaxa
- Born: Tara Burke; Philadelphia, Pennsylvania
- Origin: United States
- Genres: Experimental, psychedelic folk, drone
- Occupations: Singer, songwriter, musician
- Years active: 2000–present
- Labels: Eclipse Records, Ecstatic Peace! Records, ATP Records, Time-Lag Records, Jewelled Antler, Mt. St. Mtn., Last Visible Dog, Foxglove, Acid Mothers Temple

Fursaxa is a United States–based psychedelic folk or freak folk project led by Tara Burke of Pennsylvania. Her home-recordings feature acoustic guitar, simple Casio electronic keyboards, accordion, dulcimer and her heavily overdubbed vocals on a 4-track recorder.

She has been making music since childhood. Her music has been compared to Nico's solo work and is often categorized among New Weird America artists. The writings of Medieval mystic Hildegard von Bingen, Vladimir Nabokov, and Mircea Eliade have influenced the lyrics and mood of her work. Her musical influences include: World music, Krautrock, film soundtracks, Minimalism, Medieval and Renaissance music. She has recorded with numerous bands as a guest or side-project, including Acid Mothers Temple, fellow Philadelphians Bardo Pond, Iditarod, Scorces, The Valerie Project, and Six Organs of Admittance. Fursaxa is currently signed to the London-based ATP Recordings label. Live performances in 2010 saw Fursaxa expand to a trio, with Burke backed by harpist Mary Lattimore and cellist Helena Espvall, culminating in an appearance at the ATP New York 2010 music festival in Monticello, New York. Burke and Espvall also record and perform together as a duo under the name Anahita.

== Discography ==
Studio albums

- Immured LP, Sloowax (2016)
- Mycorrhizae Realm – CD & LP ATP Recordings (2010)
- Alone in the Dark Wood – CD, ATP Recordings & LP, Eclipse Records (2007)
- Amulet – CD, Last Visible Dog (2005)
- Lepidoptera – CD, ATP Recordings (2005)
- Madrigals in Duos – LP, Time-Lag Records (2004)
- Fursaxa – LP, Ecstatic Peace! (2002)
- Mandrake – CD, Acid Mothers Temple (2000) & LP, Eclipse Records (2004)

Singles, EPs, and limited releases

- Maidenstone – 7-inch EP, Mt. St. Mtn. (2007)
- Harbinger of Spring – 3"CD, Jewelled Antler (2004)
- Fursaxa/Juniper Meadows – split CDR, Foxglove (2004)

Self Released (Sylph) Recordings

- Kobold Moon – CD (2008)
- Myriad of Satyrids – CDR (2006)
- Amulet – CDR (2004)
- The Cult From Moon Mountain – CDR (2003)
- Trobairitz Are Here From Venus – CDR (2002)

With Helena Espvall, as Anahita

- Arcana En Cantos – CD-R, Deserted Village (2006); LP, alt.vinyl (2010)
- Matricaria – CD, Important Records (2009)
- Tourmaline – LP, Three:four Records (2017)

With Sharron Kraus, as Tau Emerald

- Travellers Two – CD, Important Records (2008)
