= Death Vessel =

American neo-traditional folk band

- Origin: Providence, Rhode Island, United States
- Genres: Folk
- Years active: 2005–present
- Labels: Sub Pop, ATP Recordings, North East Indie Records, Immune Records
- Members: Joel Thibodeau
- Website: Official website

Death Vessel is an American neo-traditional folk band from Rhode Island, signed to Sub Pop and ATP Recordings, and headed by Joel Thibodeau. Their first album, Stay Close was released on North East Indie Records in 2005 to critical acclaim.

== Biography ==
Born in Berlin, Germany and raised in Kennebunkport, Maine, Thibodeau moved to Boston, Massachusetts as a teenager and later to Providence, Rhode Island. From Providence he moved to Brooklyn, New York where he lived until moving back to Rhode Island in 2007. While in Providence he founded the band String Builder with his brother Alec and by early 2003 was playing as part of a duo with Erik Carlson, of Area C (formerly of the Purple Ivy Shadows), who he had met while living in Boston. Thibodeau and Carlson worked closely on the songs that would make up the band's first album, and performed together frequently during this period. A friend from his hometown, Micah Blue Smaldone, formerly of the Pinkerton Thugs and Out Cold also played with Thibodeau at this time and the two have toured as a duo as well. With Carlson (who co-wrote the song "Deep In the Horchata"), Smaldone, Todd Barneson, Brendan Skwire (of Jim and Jennie & The Pinetops), and Pete Donnelly (of The Figgs), Thibodeau began recording what would become Death Vessel's 2005 debut, Stay Close.

Stay Close was widely heralded for its solid songwriting, its musical ingenuity and for the unique quality of Thibodeau's crooning. His soprano register is exceptionally high for a male. Death Vessel has toured with Iron & Wine, Low, José González, and The Books, among others. In 2006 the band was signed to Seattle's venerated Sub Pop Records and London's ATP Recordings. Both labels gave Stay Close a wider release in their respective territories.

On 19 August 2008, Death Vessel's follow up to Stay Close, Nothing Is Precious Enough For Us, was released in the United States via Sub Pop Records.

In 2014, Death Vessel's third album, Island Intervals, was also by Sub Pop. Island Intervals was recorded in Reykjavik, Iceland by producer Alex Somers (Jónsi & Alex, Julianna Barwick). Jónsi of Sigur Rós appears on the song "Ilsa Drown".

== Band members ==
- Joel Thibodeau

=== Honorary and/or performing members ===
- Erik Carlson - collaborations, guitars & noises
- John Carpenter - bass & singing
- Kyla Cech - violin & singing
- Pete Donnelly - recording engineer/producer & many instruments
- Mike Gent - drums & singing
- Don Larson - banjo, guitar, ukulele
- Matthew Loiacono - mandolin & singing
- Matt McLaren - drums & maracas
- Stephanie Rabins - fiddle, guitar & singing
- Pat Rock - bass & singing
- Christopher Sadlers - upright bass
- Mike Savage - drums
- Micah Blue Smaldone - guitars & singing
- Alec Thibodeau - bass & singing
- Jeffrey Underhill - drums, guitar & singing
- Rachel Blumberg - drums
- Liz Isenberg - didgeridoo

=== Guest musicians (in the studio) ===
- Laura Baird - banjo & singing
- Meg Baird - singing
- Todd Barneson - guitars & singing
- Freddie Berman - drums
- Jennifer Black - singing
- Lisa Corson - singing
- Tim Harbeson - coronet & pump organ
- Jesse Honig - drums
- Bon Lozaga - guitar
- Daneil Mazone - drums
- Jason McGill - alto saxophone
- Matty Muir - drums
- Hansford Rowe - singing
- Brendan Skwire - upright bass
- Chuck Treece - drums
- Jónsi - vocals

== Discography ==
=== Albums ===
- Stay Close (2005) (North East Indie Records / ATP Recordings, Immune Records/ Sub Pop)
- Nothing Is Precious Enough For Us (2008, Sub Pop)
- Island Intervals (2014, Sub Pop)
