= ATP Recordings =

British independent record label

- Parent company: Forced Exposure
- Founded: 2001
- Founder: Barry Hogan
- Distributors: SRD; Forced Exposure
- Genre: Experimental, alternative rock, psychedelic, folk
- Country of origin: United Kingdom
- Location: London
- Official website: www.atpfestival.com/recordings

ATP Recordings is a British independent record label that was started in 2001 by London-based concert promoter Barry Hogan of Foundation/All Tomorrow's Parties. It was originally created to bring out a compilation cd (ATPRCD01) after the Tortoise-curated All Tomorrow's Parties event. First, everyone who attended the first festival was given a limited edition promotional sampler (PROATPFCD01), the packaging of which echoed the Factory Records style of Peter Saville. The full compilation followed later, and indeed a number of other ATP festivals would also receive the compilation treatment, the most recent being the 2006 Nightmare Before Christmas, for which ATPR and Plan B Magazine collaborated on a free cd given out to attendees.

The label eventually moved on from just doing compilations for the festival to sign bands like Threnody Ensemble, Bardo Pond, The Magic Band, Jackie-O Motherfucker, Deerhoof and White Out (with Jim O'Rourke). In recent years ATP Recordings has expanded and now also has on its roster Apse, Alexander Tucker, Death Vessel, The Drones, Fuck Buttons, Fursaxa, The Scientists, Sleepy Sun, Built To Spill, Camila Fuchs, Autolux and Grimm Grimm.

Towards the end of 2007 they announced plans to release a new series of double 7" singles called Custom Made, which would feature bands choosing four songs; one something old, one something new, one something borrowed (a cover version) and one something blue (artists were free to interpret this as they feel). The first artists to release singles in this series are The Drones, Alexander Tucker and Deerhoof.

The label also released a very special collector's edition of the classic Spiritualized album Ladies and Gentlemen We Are Floating in Space. The label announced in 2010 that they would now be releasing music from Built To Spill throughout Europe and Autolux worldwide (except Japan & North America). They have also announced the release of the debut solo album from The Drones frontman Gareth Liddiard.

For 2012 new signings include Tall Firs, Tennis and Anywhere (feat members of The Mars Volta, Triclops! and The Minutemen).

== Current artists ==
- Tall Firs
- Band
- The Mars Volta
- Triclops!
- The Minutemen
- Threnody Ensemble
- Bardo Pond
- Grimm Grimm
- The Magic Band
- The Scientists
- Fuck Buttons
- Hebronix
- Mueran Humanos
- Camila Fuchs
- Younghusband
- Loop

== Release history ==
(Information sourced from)

Cat. Number	Artist	Title	Format	Release
ATPRSP20/ATPRSP20D	Fuck Buttons	The Red Wing	12"/Download	06/2013
ATPREP04/ATPREP04D	SQURL	EP #1	12"/Download	05/2013
ATPRSP19/ATPRSP19D	Deerhoof	Mario's Flaming Whiskers III / There's That Grin	Cassette/Download	12/2012
ATPRCD47/ATPRLP47/ATPRDD47	Deerhoof	Breakup Song	CD/LP/Download	09/2012
ATPRCD46/ATPRLP46/ATPRDD46	Anywhere	Anywhere	CD/LP/Download	04/2012
ATPRCD45/ATPRLP45/ATPRDD45	Sleepy Sun	Spine Hits	CD/LP/Download	04/2012
ATPRCD43/ATPRLP43/ATPRDD43	Tall Firs	Out of It And into It	CD/LP/Download	03/2012
ATPRPUB1	Autolux	The Science of Imaginary Solutions	A6 Publication/Download	02/2012
ATPRCD44/ATPRLP44/ATPRDD44	Tennis	Young & Old	CD/LP/Download	02/2012
ATPRSP17D	Tennis	Origins	Book Page/Download	12/2011
ATPRSP16/ATPRSP16D	Tall Firs	Crooked Smiles	7"/Download	11/2011
ATPRCD09/ATPRLP09	Deerhoof	Milk Man (Remastered)	CD/White LP	06/2011
ATPRSP15/ATPRSP15D	Deerhoof	Behold A Marvel in the Darkness	7"/Download	06/2011
ATPRDS02	Sleepy Sun	Desert God	Download	05/2011
ATPRCD42/ATPRLP42	Deerhoof	Deerhoof vs. Evil	CD/LP	01/2011
ATPRCD41/ATPRLP41	Gareth Liddiard	Strange Tourist	CD/LP	01/2011
ATPRSP13	Autolux	The Bouncing Wall/Census	7"	12/2010
ATPRSE01	Sleepy Sun	Wild Machines	Download	11/2010
ATPRSP12	Sleepy Sun	Marina	10"	08/2010
ATPRCD40/ATPRLP40	Autolux	Transit Transit	CD/LP	08/2010
ATPRCD39/ATPRLP39	Sleepy Sun	Fever	CD/LP	05/2010
ATPREP02	Various Artists	ATP/R Sampler 2010	10"	04/2010
ATPREP03D	Sleepy Sun	Open Eyes	Digital EP	04/2010
ATPRSP010	Fuck Buttons	Olympians	12"	04/2010
ATPRCD38	Fursaxa	Mycorrhizae Realm	CD	03/2010
ATPRCD37	Built To Spill	There Is No Enemy	CD	02/2010
ATPRCD36	Spiritualized	Ladies and Gentlemen We Are Floating in Space	CD	12/2009
ATPRCD34/ATPRLP34	Apse	Climb Up	CD/LP	11/2009
ATPRCD31B	The Drones	Live at the Hi-Fi	CD	21 October 2009
ATPRCD35/ATPRLP35	Fuck Buttons	Tarot Sport	CD/LP	12 October 2009 UK; 20 October 2009 USA
ATPRSP09	Fuck Buttons	Surf Solar	7"	14 September 2009 UK, 15 September 2009 USA
ATPRSP08	Apse	3.1 / The Whip	7"	09/2009
ATPRSP07	Sleepy Sun	Sleepy Son	10"	31 August 2009
ATPRCD33/LP33	Sleepy Sun	Embrace	CD/LP	11 May 2009 UK + Europe; 16 June 2009 U.S.
ATPRSP06	Sleepy Sun	New Age	10"	16 March 2009 Worldwide
ATPRCD31/LP31	The Drones	Havilah	CD/LP	09/2008 AUS; 16 February 2009 Worldwide
ATPRCD32	Deerhoof	Offend Maggie	CD	6 October 2008
ATPRSP05	Fuck Buttons	Colours Move	12"/Digital	8 September 2008
ATPREP01	The Drones	The Minotaur + a brief retrospective	12"/Digital	26 August 2008
ATPRCD29	Apse	Spirit	CD	7 July 2008
ATPRCD30/LP30	Alexander Tucker	Portal	CD/LP	9 June 2008
ATPR6D02	Alexander Tucker	Custom Made	2x7"	21 April 2008
ATPRCD28/LP28	Fuck Buttons	Street Horrrsing	CD/LP	17 March 2008
ATPR6D01	The Drones	Custom Made	2x7"	2007
ATPRSP4	Fuck Buttons	Bright Tomorrow	7"	2007
ATPRSP03	Deerhoof	Matchbook Seeks Maniac	7"	2007
ATPRCD27/LP27	Death Vessel	Stay Close	CD/LP	2007
ATPRCD26	Fursaxa	Alone in the Dark Wood	CD	2007
ATPRCD25/LP25	Deerhoof	Friend Opportunity	CD/LP	2007
ATPRSP02	Deerhoof	The Perfect Me	7"	2007
ATPRCD24	The Scientists	Sedition	CD	2007
ATPR/PLANB020CD	Various	Nightmare Before Christmas 2006 (Given away at festival in association with Plan B Magazine)	CD	2006
ATPRCD23/LP23	Alexander Tucker	Furrowed Brow	CD/LP	2006
ATPRCD22/LP22	The Drones	Gala Mill	CD/LP	2006
ATPRCD21	Bardo Pond	Ticket Crystals	CD	2006
ATPRCD20	Jackie-O Motherfucker	Flags of the Sacred Harp	CD	2006
ATPRCD19	Deerhoof	The Runners Four	CD	2006
ATPRCD18	The Drones	Wait Long by the River and the Bodies of Your Enemies Will Float By	CD	2005
ATPRSP1	The Drones	Shark Fin Blues	7"	2005
ATPRCD17	Deerhoof	Green Cosmos	CD Mini-album	2005
ATPRCD16	Various	All Tomorrows Parties 3.1 - Matt Groening	CD	2005
ATPRCD15	Alexander Tucker	Old Fog	CD	2005
ATPRCD14	Bardo Pond	Selections Vols 1 to 4	2xCD	2005
ATPRCD13	Fursaxa	Lepidoptera	CD	2005
ATPRCD12	White Out	China Is Near (with Jim O'Rourke, William Winant)	CD	2005
ATPRCD11	Jackie-O Motherfucker	Fig. 5	CD	2005
ATPRCD10	Jackie-O Motherfucker	Liberation	CD	2005
ATPRCD9/LP9	Deerhoof	Milk Man	CD/LP	2005
ATPRCD8	Jackie-O Motherfucker	The Magic Fire Music / Wow	CD	2004
ATPRCD7	The Magic Band	Back to the Front	CD	2003
ATPRCD6/LP6	Bardo Pond	On the Ellipse	CD/LP	2003
ATPRCD5/LP5	Various	All Tomorrows Parties 3.0	2xCD/2xLP	2003
ATPRCD4	Threnody Ensemble	Timbre Hollow	CD	2002
ATPRCD3/LP3	Various	All Tomorrows Parties 2.0	CD/2xLP	2002
ATPRCD2/LP2	Various	All Tomorrows Parties 1.1	CD/2xLP	2002
ATPRCD1/LP1	Various	All Tomorrows Parties 1.0	CD/2xLP	2001
PROATPFCD01	Various	ATP 1.0 (Given away at first ATP festival.)	CD	2001

== See also ==
- Lists of record labels
