= Breakup Song (album) =

Studio album by Deerhoof
- Released: September 4, 2012
- Genre: Noise pop, experimental rock, synth-pop, indie electronic
- Length: 30:01
- Label: Polyvinyl
- Producer: Deerhoof

Deerhoof chronology
Deerhoof vs. Evil (2011)	Breakup Song (2012)	La Isla Bonita (2014)

Professional ratings
Aggregate scores
Source	Rating
Metacritic	78/100
Review scores
Source	Rating
AllMusic	4/5 stars
The A.V. Club	B−
BBC	(favorable)
Beats Per Minute	81%
Consequence of Sound	B
NME	4/5 stars
Pitchfork	7.2/10
The Quietus	(mixed)
Tiny Mix Tapes	4/5 stars

Breakup Song is the twelfth studio album by American experimental rock band Deerhoof. It was released on September 4, 2012 on Polyvinyl Records. A music video for the album's title track was released on June 3, 2013. It was directed by Pieter Dirkx.

== Track listing ==
All tracks are written by Ed Rodriguez, Greg Saunier, John Dieterich, and Satomi Matsuzaki, except where noted.

No.	Title	Length
1.	"Breakup Songs"	2:03
2.	"There's That Grin"	3:19
3.	"Bad Kids to the Front"	2:33
4.	"Zero Seconds Pause"	2:51
5.	"Mothball the Fleet"	3:15
6.	"Flower"	2:22
7.	"To Fly or Not to Fly"	1:45
8.	"The Trouble with Candyhands"	3:04
9.	"We Do Parties"	3:02
10.	"Mario's Flaming Whiskers III"	2:31
11.	"Fête d'Adieu"	3:16

== Personnel ==
- Deerhoof - performance, production
