= Apse (band) =

American rock band

- Origin: Newtown, Connecticut, United States
- Genres: Ambient; Avant-garde; Experimental post-rock Rock
- Years active: 1999–2011
- Labels: ATP Recordings, Acuarela Discos
- Members: Robert Toher; John Mordecai; Austin Stawiarz; Brandon Collins
- Past members: Aaron Piccirillo; Michael Gundlach; Jed Armour; Ryan Todd; Matthew Wick; Albert Gray; Ezer Lichtenstein; Daniel Sobo (touring musician)

Apse (pronounced "apps") was an American rock band signed to the UK label ATP Recordings and Spanish label Acuarela Discos. The band moved through many different musical styles since its inception, weaving together at various times shoegazer, Heavy Metal, gothic rock, post-punk, prog-rock, industrial, and post-rock influences; while at the same time working in experimental, ambient and ethereal atmospheres. The most common lyrical themes had to do with spirituality, relationships with others (human as well as paranormal or divine), paranoia, power, and control.

== Biography ==
Apse was formed in 1999 in Newtown, Connecticut by high school friends Robert Toher (guitar), Ezer Lichtenstein (drums), and Ryan Todd (bass) as an instrumental, experimental ambient rock group .

After the group recorded its first EP in 2001, friend Aaron Piccirillo joined as an additional guitarist. This lineup recorded several more EPs, and eventually Toher's vocals entered the mix. In the spring of 2003, friend Michael Gundlach (guitar) joined the band. The band's gigs were often performed in low light with the members seated, surrounded by antique electronic equipment.

By the end of 2004, Apse was signed to Acuarela Discos, based in Madrid, Spain. Apse (a self-titled, 34 minute EP), was released internationally in the spring of 2005. A second drummer, Matthew Wick, was added to the band for live performances during this period.

The group underwent another lineup change in the late summer of 2005, when Todd and Wick left the band; Piccirillo switched to bass, and Albert Gray recruited to play guitar. With this lineup, their tribal and darkly atmospheric debut album, Spirit, was recorded, and was released internationally on November 21, 2006. The group toured Europe in support of it that fall, most notably appearing at the Tanned Tin festival in Castellon, Spain .

Gray and Piccirillo left the band in early 2007, and friends Austin Stawiarz (guitar) and John Mordecai (bass) were taken on as new members for that year's European tours, which included a stop at Belgium's Pukkelpop festival. Toher and Gundlach relocated to Cape Cod, Mass., later that year, and by January 2008, creative and personal differences led to Lichtenstein and Stawiarz parting ways with the group. Brandon Collins (drums) and Jed Armour (guitar) joined the band, and Piccirillo rejoined soon after as a keyboardist/guitarist/percussionist for that spring's European tour. The band made its UK debut on that tour at the ATP v. Pitchfork Festival in Camber Sands, England, and would go on to play several more ATP festivals in the UK and US over the next two years.

A re-release of Spirit with alternate packaging and a bonus track (a version of the Eras track "Ark," which here features an alternate ending) was released on London-based ATP Recordings in July (UK) and August (US), 2008.

An album titled Eras was released in a limited run of 425 vinyl copies on Feb. 14, 2009, on Equation Records. Recorded during 2007 (various production issues delayed its release), it primarily features songs written by Toher and Lichtenstein, with an individual track each from Piccirillo and Gundlach. Eras, while similar to Spirit for its dark, experimental nature, ambient passages and heavy rhythms, marked the beginning of a stylistic shift, particularly for the occasional use of major-key chords and overall shorter song lengths. The album notably features performances from almost all of Apse's former and current members (as of 2007). There are no plans to officially release the album in any other format, but with few remaining physical copies, the band is offering it as a free download on its official site.

Numerous new songs for the follow-up to Spirit were written, demoed, performed and discarded since 2007. Recording commenced in autumn of 2008 and continued through the spring. The album, Climb Up, was finally released Oct. 20, 2009 in the UK and Nov. 10 in the US on ATP Recordings. The album marked another departure for the band; the songs are noticeably less dark, shorter, and sometimes adhere to more common rock song structures. Members have attributed the change in sound to the long time spent touring for Spirit, after which a stark contrast to the dark atmospheres was desired. The album was featured in Under the Radar magazine's Best Albums of 2009 list at No. 25. By the time of its release, Piccirillo was no longer a member of the group, though he was present for the initial writing process and is thus credited with co-writing several songs on the album ("Rook," "The Age," and "The Whip"). In 2009, the band added Daniel Sobo as a touring keyboardist/auxiliary musician for tours and live performances through 2010. Sobo, a longtime friend, produced one of the band's early EPs.

The group disbanded in early 2011, with some members moving on to form the band ERAAS.

== Discography ==
=== Albums ===
- Spirit (2006) Acuarela Discos / (2008) ATP Recordings
- Eras (2009) Equation Records
- Climb Up (2009) ATP Recordings

=== Extended plays ===
- Untitled (2001) self-released
- Cloud (2002) self-released
- Three Dialogues (2003) self-released
- Apse (2005) Acuarela Discos

=== Singles ===
- Dornier (from Three Dialogues, 2003) self-released
- Marrer (from Apse, 2004) self-released
- 3.1 / The Whip (Double A-side, 2009) ATP Recordings

== Related Projects ==
Besides their work in Apse, members Robert Toher and Aaron Piccirillo have projects outside of the band. Robert wrote solo material under the moniker Goldfall and currently Public Memory, and Aaron wrote under the moniker Somnolent. In 2005, Somnolent released two tracks on a sampler CD titled Nothing Concrete on 99xoutof10 records, a label created by Roger O'Donnell, keyboardist for The Cure. Aaron has also written for Ultraculture, Clavis Journal, Aeon Sophia Press, and Appalachia Journal, and was included in New Wilderness Voices, an anthology of nature writing released in July 2017 by the University Press of New England. He has also recorded under the names Synesect and D. H. Grey

Following the break-up of Apse, Robert Toher and Austin Stawiarz started a new project and released music under the name ERAAS.
