= La Isla Bonita (album) =

Studio album by Deerhoof
- Released: November 4, 2014
- Genre: Indie rock, noise rock
- Length: 31:49
- Label: Polyvinyl
- Producer: Nick Sylvester

Deerhoof chronology
Breakup Song (2012)	La Isla Bonita (2014)	Fever 121614 (2015)

La Isla Bonita is the thirteenth studio album by American experimental rock band Deerhoof. Produced by former music journalist and Mr. Dream drummer Nick Sylvester, it was released on November 4, 2014 through Polyvinyl Record Co.

The track "Exit Only" was released as the first single off the album on August 20, 2014. On September 10, 2014, Deerhoof shared the second track "Paradise Girls". The band embarked on a tour in support of the album in November 2014.

== Background ==
The album's recording started when Deerhoof tried to write a track similar to their live cover of Ramones’ "Pinhead", which resulted in the track "Exit Only". Demo tracks were recorded for a week at guitarist Ed Rodriguez’s home in Oregon and sent to Nick Sylvester, who eventually produced the album. The album draws upon a wide array of influences, including Radiohead, The Flaming Lips, Lou Reed, Sonic Youth, Beck, the Roots, Ric Ocasek, David Byrne, Janet Jackson, and Madonna, with the album's title being a reference to Madonna's "La Isla Bonita".

On the same press release, drummer Greg Saunier stated:

No band is an island. Felt like one sometimes, in those budgetless and obscure early days, Satomi [Matsuzaki] and me locked in the basement trying to figure out how our clashing personalities and ideas could turn into a band. If we hadn’t had that crazed mid-’90s Bay Area punk scene to call home, I doubt we’d still be here to chat about a 20th anniversary. We don’t set out to create masterpieces. The Deerhoof fan is a thrill-seeker. This is the latest volley in an ongoing conversation we’ve been honored to hold for 20 years.

== Critical reception ==
Professional ratings
Aggregate scores
Source	Rating
Metacritic	77/100
Review scores
Source	Rating
AllMusic	4/5 stars

La Isla Bonita received positive reviews from music critics. At Metacritic, which assigns a normalized rating out of 100 to reviews from critics, the album received an average score of 77, which indicates "generally positive reviews", based on 27 reviews. AllMusic critic Heather Phares regarded the record as "another fine example of how the band changes course on almost every album" and wrote: "they've been able to put different but cohesive spins on their sound so well, and for so long, is truly remarkable."

== Track listing ==
1. "Paradise Girls" — 3:35
2. "Mirror Monster" — 2:39
3. "Doom" — 3:20
4. "Last Fad" — 3:03
5. "Tiny Bubbles" — 3:28
6. "Exit Only" — 2:45
7. "Big House Waltz" — 3:27
8. "God 2" — 1:43
9. "Black Pitch" — 3:24
10. "Oh Bummer" — 4:25

== Personnel ==
Deerhoof

- Satomi Matsuzaki
- John Dieterich
- Ed Rodriguez
- Greg Saunier

Technical personnel

- Nick Sylvester – production
