= The Punks =

American proto-punk band

Background information
- Origin: Waterford, Michigan, United States
- Genres: Proto-punk; hard rock; punk rock
- Years active: 1973–1977
- Label: Rave Up
- Past members: William "Frantic" Kuchon; Alan Webber; Steve Rockey; Rod McMahon; Craig Webber

The Punks were an American proto-punk band from Waterford, Michigan near Detroit, who were active from 1973-1977. They specialized in a hard-driving, sometimes thrashing sound that anticipated much mid-to-late 1970s punk rock and 1980s hardcore. The group came out of the last vestiges of the Detroit rock scene that produced bands such as MC5, Iggy and the Stooges, and Death, and with these acts they formed a musical bridge between the garage rock bands of the 1960s and the later punk movement that emerged in New York and London during the mid-1970s. In 1977 they changed their name to the End and moved to New York with hopes of making their mark in the burgeoning punk rock scene there, but were unsuccessful, and broke up shortly thereafter. Though relatively unknown outside of Detroit and New York in their day, they have more recently garnered the interest and accolades of underground rock enthusiasts who consider them to be pioneers in the early development of punk rock. Parts of their song "My Time's Comin'" were used in the soundtrack of two March 2016 episodes of the television series, Vinyl, co-created by the Rolling Stones’ Mick Jagger and director Martin Scorsese.

== History ==
=== Active years 1973–1977 ===
The Punks formed in Waterford, Michigan, outside of Detroit in 1973. The band was fronted by the highly charismatic lead singer William "Frantic" Kuchon, who has sometimes been compared to Iggy Pop. The group came at the tail end of the Detroit rock scene that produced acts such as MC5 and Iggy and the Stooges, Alice Cooper and these groups were the Punks' primary influences, along with some of the earlier Detroit garage bands of the mid-1960s such as the Underdogs and the Unrelated Segments, as well as acts from elsewhere such as the Velvet Underground and Blue Cheer. The rest of their lineup consisted of Alan Webber and Steve Rockey on guitars, Rod McMahon on bass, and Craig Webber (Alan's younger brother) on drums. The band was known for its volume and energy and exciting live show.

The group made use of occasional costumes and theatrics customary of the glam rock trends of the time. They played gigs when available in the Detroit metro area, and were even touted by influential writer Lester Bangs in a piece for Creem magazine and in another piece that appeared in Creem in September 1976 Air-Wreck Genheimer said of the group: "The Punks played in such a gut grabbing manner that your ear bones feel like they're getting socked in the jaw and cunnilinguisized at the same time". According to Richard Blondy, their former manager and booking agent, "Their music was so intense and so strong, and their stage show was so exciting. It’s just like the guy said about (the Naughty Bits) on ‘Vinyl’—they smack you in the face and they get your attention". In 1974, the group recorded a series of demos in the basement of Alan and Craig Webber's family house in Waterford Township. Several of the tracks they recorded such as "My Time's Comin'", "Q1", and "Drop Dead" display a thrashing intensity indicative of future punk acts.

By 1974 the once thriving Detroit rock scene had dissipated and most of its venues either folded or switched their focus to other musical styles. According to Alan Webber, "We were left going, 'OK, there’s nothing more for us here. Let’s make our own noise." Sensing the futility of trying to remain in Detroit, in early 1977, the band changed its name to the End, and re-located to New York in hopes of making it in the thriving punk rock scene there, but the band was unable to gain a sizable following or land a record deal and ended up out of money and disillusioned. They returned to Detroit and essentially became dormant, ceasing to play, except for occasional private get-togethers—in the words of Alan Webber "just to entertain ourselves...we never had an official, ‘Well, we’re done.’"

=== Later developments ===
The former members of the group moved on to other endeavors. Vocalist William Kuchon, spent time working in the film industry in California. Guitarist Alan Webber is retired and living in Pontiac. Bassist Rod McMahon is a heating and cooling contractor in Auburn Hills, and guitarist Steve Rockey is retired and living in Grand Blanc, Michigan. Webber’s younger brother Craig, the Punks’ original drummer, died in 2011, though another younger brother, Paul, also plays drums. At the turn of the millennium, a Detroit web site, MotorCityJams.com, chronicled the group's career and helped organize the 2003 release of a limited edition CD culled from some of the band's assorted demos and recordings entitled The Most Powerful Music on Earth. It was subsequently distributed by Italy's Rave Up Records on LP in 2005. Many of the tracks have made their way onto YouTube and other internet sites.

The last time The Punks played together privately was in 2011 before drummer Craig Webber died. They reunited again in 2015 (with Craig's brother Paul Playing drums), at the Motor City Music Awards, where they were introduced by Violent J of The Insane Clown Posse as "Detroit Legends". Toronto filmmaker Bennett Phillips, in association with Chains of Madness Motion Pictures, has begun work on a documentary about the band to be titled My Time’s Coming: The Story of The Punks. Their song "My Time's Comin'" was used in the soundtrack for the March 13th and 20th (2016) episodes of the television series, Vinyl, co-created by the Rolling Stones’ Mick Jagger and director Martin Scorsese, in which the Nasty Bits, a fictitious band headed by a lead singer and front man played by Mick Jagger's son James Jagger, attempt to record parts of the song." The show's creators indicate that other songs by the punks may be used in future episodes." Alan Webber indicates that interest in the band could justify release of some of the other unreleased songs in their archive: "there were other recordings we did--I’ve got tons of material we did over the years...And the rest has been history--and possibly a future".

== Membership ==
- William "Frantic" Kuchon (lead vocals)
- Alan Webber (guitar)
- Steve Rockey (guitar)
- Rod McMahon (bass)
- Craig Webber (drums)

== Discography ==
=== Compilations ===
- The Most Powerful Music on Earth (CD, Motor City Music, 2003)
- The Punks (LP, Rave Up Records, 2005)

== See also ==
- Death - early-mid 1970s proto-punk band from Detroit
