= 5 Rue Christine =

American independent record label

- Company logo, featuring a “not equal” sign with the text “5RC:” below.
- Parent company: Kill Rock Stars
- Founded: 1997
- Founder: Slim Moon
- Defunct: 2007 (dormant)
- Genre: Experimental rock Indie rock
- Country of origin: United States
- Location: Olympia, Washington

5 Rue Christine (also known as 5RC) is a semi-defunct Olympia, Washington based independent record label, formed as a spin-off from the Kill Rock Stars label in 1997. Before its dormancy, it had become a premier label for experimental rock bands. In 2007, 5RC released its final record.

== Bands ==
- The Advantage
- Amps for Christ
- BARR
- Deerhoof
- Excepter
- Hella
- Inca Ore
- The Mae Shi
- Marnie Stern
- Metalux
- Need New Body
- Nervous Cop
- No-Neck Blues Band
- The Punks
- The Robot Ate Me
- The Seconds
- Slim Moon and What Army
- The Planet The
- Voltage
- Wooden Wand and the Vanishing Voice
- Xiu Xiu

=== Left 5 Rue Christine ===
- The Get Hustle
- Out Hud
- Rob Fisk
- XBXRX
- Young People

=== Disbanded ===
- Godzik Pink
- Men's Recovery Project
- Replikants
- Schema
- Semiautomatic
- Witchypoo

== See also ==
- List of record labels
- Kill Rock Stars
