= Deerhoof =

American band

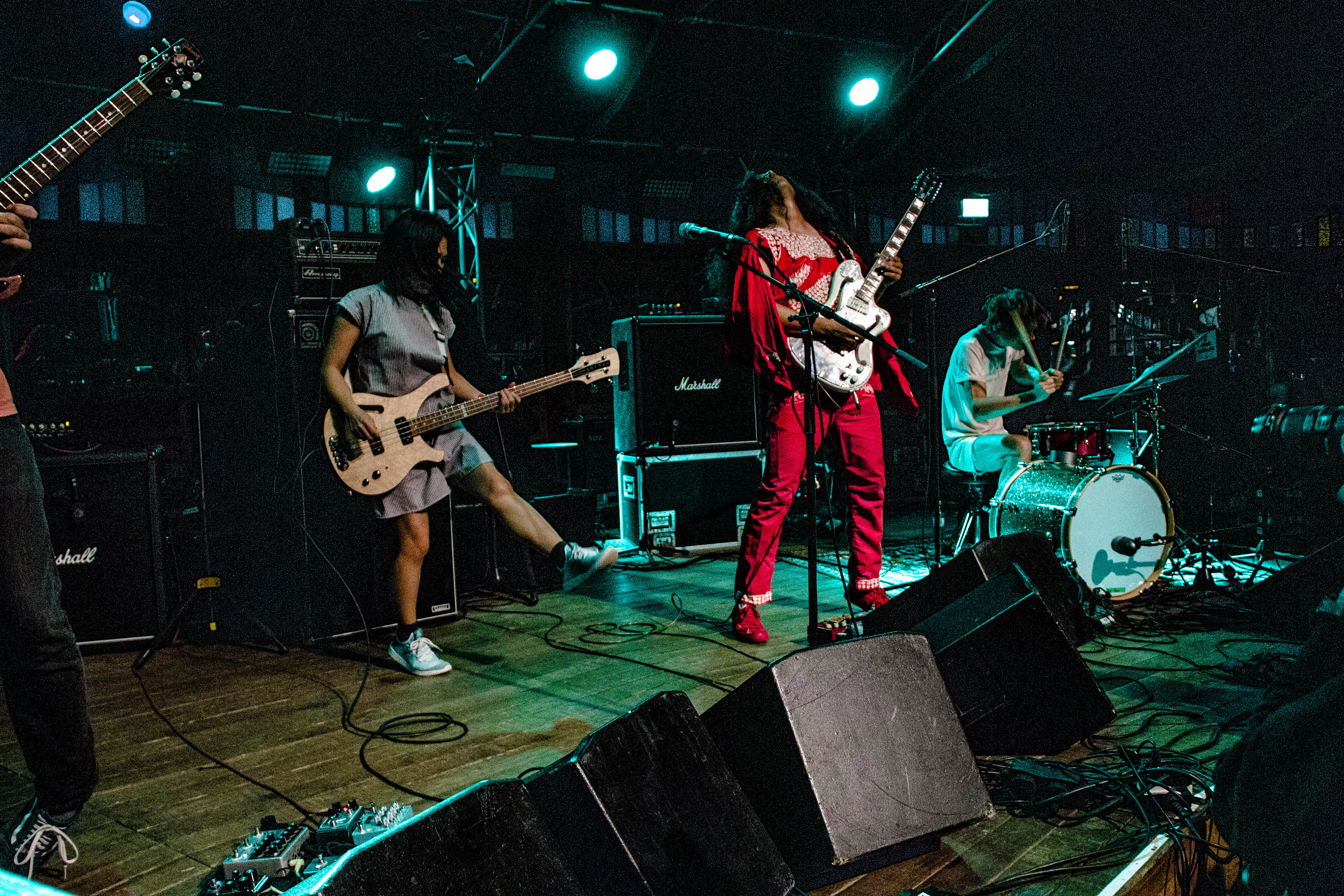
- Deerhoof performing at Haldern Pop in 2018

Background information
- Origin: San Francisco, California, U.S.
- Genres: Indie rock; experimental pop; noise pop; punk rock
- Years active: 1994–present
- Labels: Joyful Noise; Polyvinyl; Kill Rock Stars; Felicity; Upset the Rhythm; Altin Village and Mine; Clapping Music; Kythibong; P-Vine; Flying Nun; Trifekta; ATP; Toad; Menlo Park; New Amsterdam
- Members: Satomi Matsuzaki; John Dieterich; Ed Rodríguez; Greg Saunier
- Past members: Chris Cohen; Rob Fisk; Kelly Goode
- Website: deerhoof.website

Deerhoof is an American musical group formed in San Francisco in 1994. It consists of founding drummer Greg Saunier, bassist and singer Satomi Matsuzaki, and guitarists John Dieterich and Ed Rodriguez. Beginning as an improvised noise punk band, Deerhoof became widely renowned and influential in the 2000s through its self-produced albums.

Deerhoof has released 20 studio albums since 1997. Its most recent, Noble and Godlike in Ruin, was released on April 25, 2025.

== History ==
=== Formation ===
Deerhoof was formed in San Francisco in 1994 as Rob Fisk's improvisational bass/harmonica solo project. Greg Saunier joined on drums a week later. They were quickly signed to record a single for Kill Rock Stars after owner Slim Moon witnessed their performance at the 1994 Yoyo A Go Go festival. Satomi Matsuzaki joined Deerhoof within a week of moving to the United States from Japan in May 1995, with no prior experience playing in a band, and went on tour as Deerhoof's singer only a week later, opening for Caroliner. Deerhoof's 1997 debut album, The Man, the King, the Girl, was recorded on a 4-track tape.

Deerhoof had a music practice space at the Art Explosion Studios at 2425 17th Street in the Mission District; other bands in this space included Creeper Lagoon, Beulah, Zmrzlina, Don't Mean Maybe, and S----- S------ Band Band.

=== Breakthrough ===
Chris Cohen joined Deerhoof on guitar in 2002, between Reveille's completion and release.

In contrast to Reveille's digital production process, 2003's Apple O' was played almost entirely live to tape in one nine-hour session with Jay Pellicci engineering. Extinction, nuclear holocaust, invasive species, and the Greek god of music all figure prominently in the album's themes. Karen O chose Apple O' in the Rolling Stone 2003 Music Awards, Artists' Top Albums, and the album received some critical praise, notably in the New York Times. But in what became a pattern for Deerhoof, the album's critical appraisal improved with time, and Pitchfork later listed Apple O' as one of the top albums of the 2000s. The record's antiwar themes were underscored by Deerhoof's outspoken opposition to the Iraq War.

By 2003 Deerhoof had become the longest-running band on Kill Rock Stars. Matsuzaki was editing a Bay Area Japanese magazine, Cohen was waiting tables at a Thai restaurant, and Dieterich and Saunier were doing data entry for legal and consulting firms, but that year they all quit their jobs simultaneously to focus on touring. That year they contributed to Azadi! A Benefit Compilation for the Revolutionary Association of the Women of Afghanistan. Saunier also released Nervous Cop, a collaboration album with Zach Hill and Joanna Newsom.

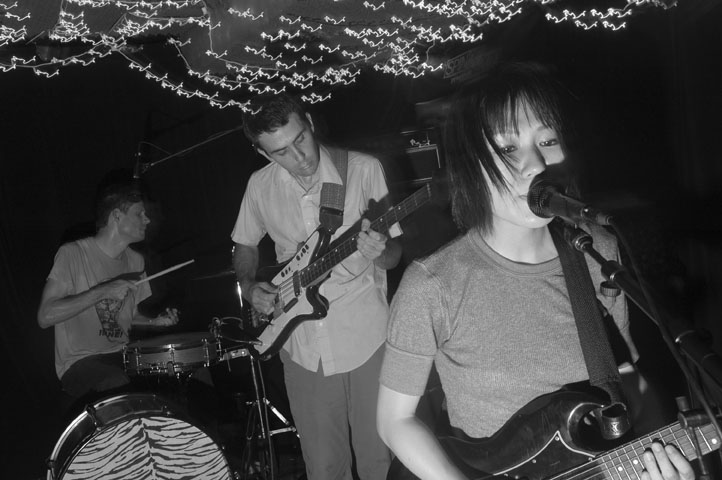
Deerhoof performing in 2004

Deerhoof's next record was inspired by a crudely drawn character created by the Japanese artist Ken Kagami. 2004's Milk Man featured an opulent, campy sound inspired by Broadway and Igor Stravinsky. It was nominated for "Outstanding Alternative Album" in the California Music Awards, and stayed at No. 1 on the Dusted Radio Chart for six consecutive weeks, and reached No. 1 on the CMJ Core Chart. Also in 2004 Deerhoof received the Editor's Choice Award from 7x7 magazine, and was voted "Best Local Rock Band" by readers of SF Weekly. In 2006 Milk Man was adapted to a children's ballet.

Deerhoof's next release was its first to be sung in Matsuzaki's native language of Japanese. 2005's mini-album Green Cosmos combined an orchestral sound with dance music styles.

Deerhoof spent several months in 2005 in a rented rehearsal space in Oakland, writing and recording daily as a full band. When the result was released that fall, the double album The Runners Four featured each band member taking turns as vocalist, singing unusually wordy lyrics in which Arks and time capsules recur, as though foretelling that this would be this lineup's final recording. Instrumental roles were reversed for Matsuzaki (now on guitar) and Cohen (now on bass).

In 2006, Danielson released the critically acclaimed Ships, which featured Deerhoof as the backing band on many of the tracks. Later that year, after an extensive world tour that ended at Coachella, Deerhoof composed and performed a live soundtrack to Harry Smith's hour-long animated film Heaven and Earth Magic at the San Francisco International Film Festival. This was Cohen's last activity with Deerhoof. The split was amicable. Commemorating Cohen, Deerhoof posted a free EP on its website, one of several it has posted over the years. Chris Cohen now records and tours as a solo act.

=== Reconfiguration ===
Matsuzaki, Saunier, and Dieterich began a new recording as a trio. They recorded mostly in Dieterich's bedroom and mixed on the band's laptop in hotel rooms during tours with Radiohead, the Flaming Lips, and Beck. Some material was from the "Heaven and Earth Magic" soundtrack, some was completely orchestral (without drums or guitars), and one song ("Matchbook Seeks Maniac") was specifically created for a Hollywood film's end credits. The album was highly praised in Pitchfork and Rolling Stone.

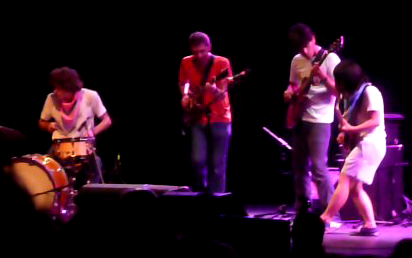
Deerhoof at Prospect Park in Brooklyn in 2008

By January 2008 Deerhoof became a quartet again with the addition of the Flying Luttenbachers/Gorge Trio/XBXRX guitarist and longtime friend Ed Rodriguez. That summer Deerhoof released the song "Fresh Born" online as sheet music only, anticipating similar experiments by Beck and Blur by several years. Fans recorded and uploaded their own versions of the song to a website before anyone outside the band had heard Deerhoof's version. The October 2008 album Offend Maggie was praised by VH1, NPR, Entertainment Weekly, Alternative Press, The Guardian, and Mojo.

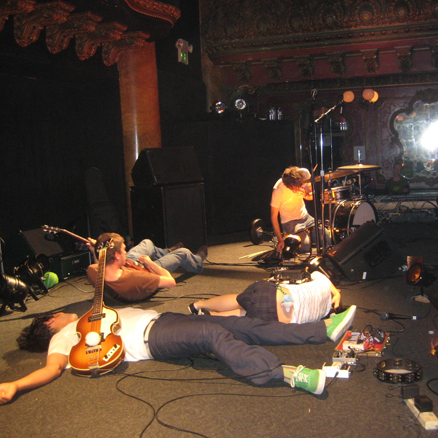
Deerhoof performing in 2009

In April 2010 Deerhoof curated the Belgian music festival Sonic City, inviting an eclectic array of European acts including The Go! Team, Paolo Pandolfo, and sitting in with the Belgian punk band the Kids. In April and July 2010, Deerhoof and Xiu Xiu joined to perform Joy Division's album Unknown Pleasures live at the Donaufestival in Austria and at Brooklyn's Williamsburg Waterfront.

=== Format experimentation ===
Building on "I Did Crimes For You", during this time Deerhoof continued to record in a rented rehearsal space in Oakland. Musical influences from the Beach Boys, new romanticism, tropicalia, and the Congotronics series found their way onto 2011's Deerhoof vs. Evil. The band released the album one track at a time via different media outlets online, with a full map and schedule available on its website. The album was acclaimed by Entertainment Weekly, MOJO, and Paste. Matt Goldman's design was the second Deerhoof album cover to feature a mushroom cloud. Shugo Tokumaru remixed "Behold a Marvel in the Darkness". Deerhoof immediately initiated a 7-inch series wherein guest vocalists (including Jeff Tweedy of Wilco, Kevin Barnes of Of Montreal, singer-songwriter David Bazan, rapper Busdriver, and others) sang new lyrics over an instrumental of a Deerhoof vs. Evil song of their choice.

Deerhoof was The Wire magazine's January 2011 cover story. It contributed to Polyvinyl's benefit compilation Japan 3.11.11, joining the relief efforts for March's earthquake and tsunami. Over the summer of 2011, Deerhoof toured with Congotronics Vs. Rockers, an international supergroup, alongside Konono N°1, Juana Molina, Kasai Allstars, and others. Its onstage repertoire included the Deerhoof song "Super Duper Rescue Heads" from Deerhoof Vs. Evil. In April 2012 Deerhoof collaborated with Questlove, Reggie Watts, Sasha Grey, and others in a conceptual concert event called Shuffle Culture at Brooklyn Academy of Music. In April 2012 a young adult fiction book, Rules to Rock By, by Josh Farrar was published; it is about a 12-year-old girl who is inspired by Deerhoof to form her own band. Deerhoof's version of LiLiPUT's "Hitchhike" appears on the soundtrack. In June 2012 at a Deerhoof performance in Chicago's Millennium Park, contemporary classical music ensemble Dal Niente performed Marcos Balter's arrangement of Deerhoof's "Eaguru Guru". The same month, Deerhoof and The Flaming Lips performed songs by King Crimson, Canned Heat, and Deerhoof onstage together.

In 2012 Deerhoof also began home-recording the record Breakup Song. The band said the album was a response to the tradition of breakup songs, which it felt included too many sad songs and too few empowering ones. After a long final mixing session at Saunier's apartment, Matsuzaki took the front cover photo of a garbage truck in the early morning. The Polyvinyl Records release was also released on Joyful Noise Recordings in "flexi-book" format, allowing listeners to flip from song to song as if each track were a page in a storybook. Deerhoof hero Simeon of Silver Apples remixed "Mario's Flaming Whiskers III". Revealing some of Deerhoof's working methods and group chemistry, a rare full-band interview, with former MTV VJ John Norris, appeared in the fall 2012 Interview magazine.

In October, Deerhoof released a single, "Sexy, but Sparkly", produced by Fear of a Black Planet co-producer Chris Shaw, the first time Deerhoof worked with a producer. It was recorded as part of the series of short documentaries Masters From Their Day, which chronicles the efforts of a band and a record producer as they attempt to record and mix a new single in one day. The song then appeared in the LAMC split-7" series, in which a well-known artist chooses a lesser-known one (Deerhoof chose Half Waif) to make their recorded debut, with proceeds going to the Ariel Panero Memorial Fund at VH1 Save the Music.

Deerhoof's 12th album, 2014's La Isla Bonita, was self-recorded live in guitarist Ed Rodriguez's basement during a "weeklong sleepover arguing over whether to try and sound like Joan Jett or Janet Jackson". The recordings were meant as demos to be rerecorded with former music journalist and Mr. Dream drummer Nick Sylvester, but the band liked the raw DIY versions so much it just kept them and recorded the vocals with Sylvester. The lyrics were heavily influenced by Columbia professor Jonathan Crary's book 24/7. The album art is by Sara Cwynar. The video for "Exit Only" featured Michael Shannon playing two roles, with a cameo by Rodriguez. The Guardian, on its exclusive preview stream of La Isla Bonita, collected testimonials about Deerhoof from various notable musicians and artists, including Radiohead's Jonny Greenwood, Henry Rollins, Blur's Graham Coxon, Adam Green, the Yeah Yeah Yeahs' Brian Chase, and David Shrigley. The album received high praise from NPR, A.V. Club, Alternative Press, and The Wire, and was reviewed by Tune-Yards' Merril Garbus for Talkhouse.

=== 20-year anniversary ===
For Deerhoof and Lightning Bolt's mutual 20-year anniversary, Matt Conboy directed a Pitchfork-premiered documentary, "Checking in at 20", about their respective drummers. 2014 also saw the release of Deerhoof's contribution to the BOATS compilation, an international arts project featuring and supporting Dalit "untouchable" children in south-east India and featuring samples of the Light of Love Children's Choir.

During the world tour for La Isla Bonita, three complete-performance live videos were shot: their November 4 record release show in Brooklyn, a nine-song Boiler Room session recorded in London while both Rodriguez and Matsuzaki were ill with fevers and Saunier had a black eye, and a December 16 performance recorded at a tiny Tokyo rock club called Fever, resulting in a live album, Fever 121614. The 2015 release included a downloadable video of the entire show, edited by longtime friend and collaborator Noriko Oishi. The LP/CD artwork included a massive collage of fan-contributed drawings of the band in manga style. Also in 2015 Deerhoof contributed a track in support of gay and transgender Hoosiers on the Joyful Noise compilation 50 Bands & a Cat for Indiana Equality.

In August 2015, the band was the first act invited to perform improvisational site-specific noise music at CERN's Large Hadron Collider, as part of the Ex/Noise/CERN project, founded by particle physicist James Beacham, who stated, "Musical curiosity is similar to scientific curiosity and, on a personal level, Deerhoof has inspired me as much as Einstein". The resulting film of the project quickly became one of the top ten most-watched videos ever produced by CERN and received wide coverage in the music, art, and science press, as well as positive responses from notable artists, musicians, and writers.

In 2016 Deerhoof released The Magic. The album blends glam metal, punk, and noise, but also includes a cover of "I Don't Want to Set the World on Fire" by The Ink Spots. The cover art was by Matsuzaki. Joseph Baughman created the stop-motion music video for the album's "The Devil and his Anarchic Surrealist Retinue". Baughman described his style as a slow-motion improvisation. The clay animated video features chessboard pieces and multicolored minotaurs.

The Magic was the first Deerhoof album to hit No. 1 on CMJ, and was highly praised by NPR, A.V. Club and Exclaim. A.V. Club invited them to participate in A.V. Undercover, where bands choose from an ever-dwindling list of songs to cover on video. They ended up with "Goody Two Shoes" by Adam Ant but included an excerpt of "Hot for Teacher" by Van Halen. Those who pre-ordered The Magic from Polyvinyl were treated to a surprise cassette that included Deerhoof doing covers of Def Leppard, Van Halen, David Bowie, Madonna, Sonic Youth, Malaria!, and Public Enemy. Their cover of "Fight the Power" appears on the Planned Parenthood benefit compilation Cover Your Ass. They contributed a cover of Xiu Xiu's "Hi", played in the style of White Reaper, to the Polyvinyl Plays Polyvinyl compilation.

After a long world tour for The Magic, Deerhoof was invited by Red Hot Chili Peppers to open their concerts in northern European arenas in November 2016. Deerhoof is confirmed to open for Red Hot Chili Peppers again in summer 2017. They were one of the headliners of 2017's Big Ears Festival.

=== Joyful Noise Recordings ===
In 2017 Deerhoof was chosen as Joyful Noise Recordings' Artist in Residence. Deerhoof and several Deerhoof-related collaborative projects will be releasing five new LPs in 2017. Proceeds will be donated to a variety of causes, the first of which will be Brand New Congress. On June 28 Deerhoof announced a new album titled Mountain Moves and premiered the first single "I Will Spite Survive" (featuring Jenn Wasner on guest vocals) on Democracy Now!. A second single "Your Dystopic Creation Does Not Fear You" (featuring rapper Awkwafina) was premiered on the Adult Swim Singles Series. Mountain Moves was released on September 8, 2017.

On May 29, 2020, the band released their fifteenth album, Future Teenage Cave Artists. They had previously released three singles from it: the title track, "The Loved One", and "Farewell Symphony". Future Teenage Cave Artists is notable in that it is Deerhoof's first overt concept record.

Greg Saunier said in an August 2020 interview that a "sort of a sequel" to Future Teenage Cave Artists would be "coming out in a couple months". On September 28 they released Love-Lore.

On October 22, 2021, the band released the studio album Actually, You Can.

On December 21, 2021, the band released the live album Devil Kids.

The band released Miracle-Level on March 31, 2023. It is notable in that it is their first to be produced in a recording studio (rather than ad hoc spaces) and to have its lyrics entirely in Japanese.

On April 8, 2024, Saunier announced his solo debut album We Sang, Therefore We Were, which was released on April 26 by Joyful Noise.

On April 25, 2025, Deerhoof released the studio album Noble and Godlike in Ruin.

On June 30, 2025, Deerhoof announced that they would pull their music from Spotify following reports that the platform's founder, Daniel Ek, had invested in the AI weapons development company Helsing.

== Musical style and legacy ==
Deerhoof's style has been described as indie rock, noise pop, punk rock, and "experimental pop mired in a pure punk sense of adventure". AllMusic characterizes them as "highly revered indie rockers ... who play fractured, whimsical noise pop with an avant-garde edge", while MaineToday describes them as "the beloved punk band whose erratic style veers between pop, noise, and classic rock and roll".

According to Noisey, Deerhoof formed as a "minimal noise improv" act before shifting to "pop-infused noise-punk". According to AllMusic, their early releases "had a more traditionally harsh, no wave-inspired sound, though they also included the quirky tendencies that dominated their later efforts ... [which] mix noise, sugary melodies, and an experimental spirit into utterly distinctive music that made them one of the most acclaimed acts of the 2000s and 2010s." Impose wrote that since its "beginnings as a noise punk band ... [Deerhoof has] taken leaps and bounds artistically and stylistically, experimenting with pop and punk in ways we could've never imagined ... [and] ultimately [proving] that punk can fit into an artistic world." According to the Los Angeles Philharmonic, it made "some of the most difficult and unclassifiable noise of the mid-'90s [before] unexpectedly [rising] to international prominence as one of indie rock's most renowned and influential groups ... too 'pop' for 'noise,' and too 'noise' for 'pop.'" For The Guardian, its breakthrough after many albums of "elliptical art-pop" came with Friend Opportunity, which showcased "a band playing a constantly shifting mixture of psychedelia, post-punk, jazz and pop, which should have been difficult and forbidding, but was given an accessible focus by the sweet vocals and expressionist lyrics of bassist/chanteuse Satomi Matsuzaki. ... [The followup] Offend Maggie is head-spinning bliss from beginning to end, and proves that the quartet are the best prog-rock post-punk Afro-Oriental art-pop folk-jazz band in the world. Deerhoof also experiments with contemporary classical music.

In 2005, Nick Sylvester wrote in Pitchfork that it was "the best band in the world".

Rodriguez describes early influences in his teens like blues-rock guitarists Jimi Hendrix, Joe Satriani, and Albert King. As his interests broadened Rodriguez found himself increasingly drawn to more experimental performers who performed in an unusual manner such as Robert Fripp, Sonny Sharrock and Derek Bailey, particularly Bailey's combining fretted notes and harmonics to create a wide range of tones.

Deerhoof is known for its anti-capitalist, pro-social, and radical DIY approach to art and life as exemplified by its work with and homages to anthropologist David Graeber (an organizer of Occupy Wall Street), its anti-marketing campaigns, trenchant published commentary, and use of a low-budget and eco-friendly style of production and touring (for example, when it went on tour with the Red Hot Chili Peppers, they all rode together with all their gear to arena gigs in a Prius minivan behind the Chili Peppers' fleet of busses and semi-trailers.)

The band has been appreciated by and/or influential to other artists, notably David Bowie, Radiohead, Questlove, St. Vincent, Foo Fighters, Dirty Projectors, Tune-Yards, Stereolab, Henry Rollins, Sleigh Bells, and of Montreal. Deerhoof's songs are covered often by other artists (notably Phil Lesh, Los Campesinos!, Marco Benevento, David Bazan, and classical composer Marcos Balter).

== Members ==
Current

- Greg Saunier – drums, vocals (1994–present)
- Satomi Matsuzaki – vocals, bass (1995–present), guitar (1995–1997, 2005–2006)
- John Dieterich – guitar (1999–present)
- Ed Rodríguez – guitar (2008–present)

Former

- Rob Fisk – guitar (1994–1999), bass (1994–1997), harmonica (1994)
- Kelly Goode – keyboards (1997–1999)
- Chris Cohen – guitar (2002–2006), bass (2005–2006)

== Discography ==
Studio albums

- Dirt Pirate Creed (1996)
- The Man, the King, the Girl (1997)
- Holdypaws (1999)
- Halfbird (2001)
- Reveille (2002)
- Apple O' (2003)
- Milk Man (2004)
- The Runners Four (2005)
- Friend Opportunity (2007)
- Offend Maggie (2008)
- Deerhoof vs. Evil (2011)
- Breakup Song (2012)
- La Isla Bonita (2014)
- The Magic (2016)
- Mountain Moves (2017)
- Future Teenage Cave Artists (2020)
- Love-Lore (2020) (medley covers album)
- Actually, You Can (2021)
- Miracle-Level (2023)
- Noble and Godlike in Ruin (2025)
- Divine Schism (2026)

EPs

- Green Cosmos (2005)
- Untitled (2006)
- Deerhoof Plays the Music of The Shining (2018)

Live albums

- Koalamagic (2001)
- Bibidi Babidi Boo (2004)
- 99% upset feeling (2011)
- Fever 121614 (2015)
- To Be Surrounded By Beautiful, Curious, Breathing, Laughing Flesh Is Enough (2020) (with Wadada Leo Smith)
- Devil Kids (2021)

Collaborations

- Nervous Cop (2003)
- Balter/Saunier (2016)

Deerhoof has also released a large number of 7-inch singles, split releases with other artists, tracks on compilations, and free downloadable EPs.
