= Greg Saunier =

American drummer (born 1969)

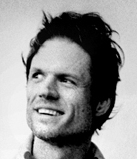
- Greg Saunier in 2009

Background information
- Born: 18 May 1969 (age 57); Valdivia, Chile
- Origin: United States
- Genres: Rock; experimental; avant-pop; noise
- Occupations: Musician; producer; composer
- Instruments: Drums; percussion; electronics; vocals
- Years active: 1990–present
- Labels: Polyvinyl; Kill Rock Stars; Joyful Noise
- Member of: Deerhoof
- Formerly of: Nitre Pit; Mystical Weapons; Nervous Cop

Gregory Lovell Saunier (/ˈsɔːnjeɪ/ SAWN-yay, born 18 May 1969) is a musician, producer, and composer best known as the drummer and founding member of Deerhoof.

Rolling Stone included Saunier alongside Brian Chippendale (of Lightning Bolt) and Zach Hill (of Hella, later Death Grips and the I.L.Y's) as together composing "a generation of trailblazing 21st-century avant-rock percussionists".

== Early life ==
Saunier was born in Valdivia, Chile, while his parents were serving as volunteers in the Peace Corps, and also lived in Peru during his early childhood. After his family returned to the United States, Saunier grew up in Columbia, Maryland.

Saunier began playing the drums in the third grade, as part of his school band. He has cited the Rolling Stones as a major early musical influence.

== Career ==
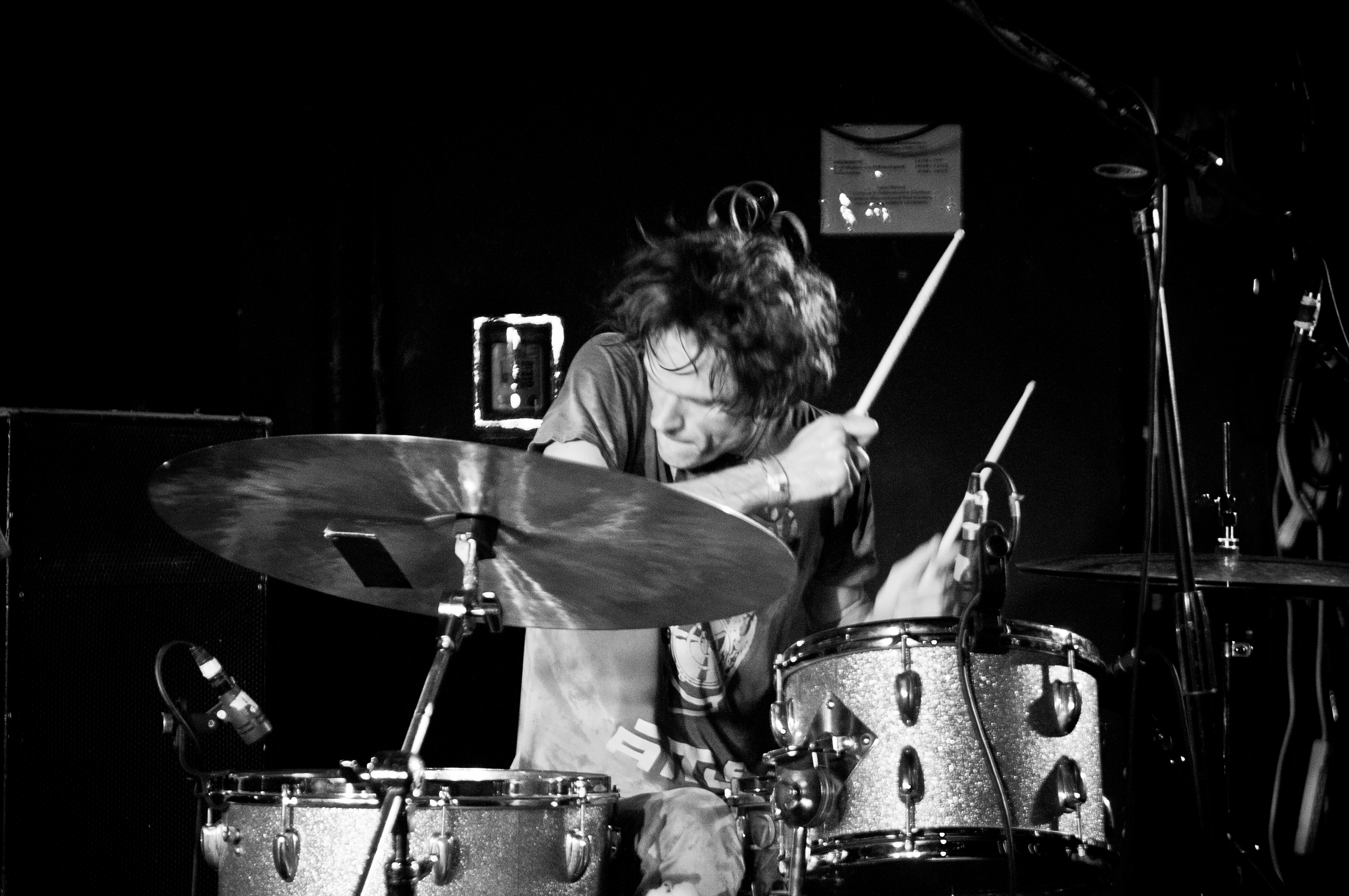
Saunier in 2011

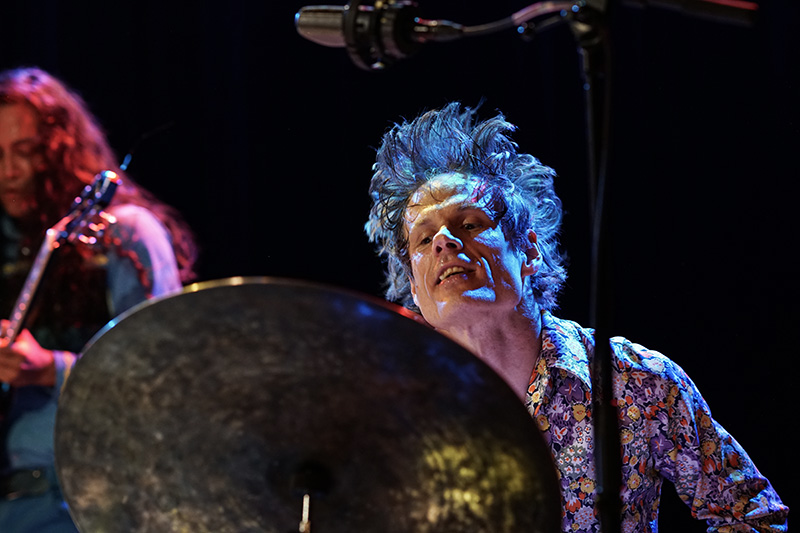
Saunier in 2017

Saunier graduated from the Oberlin Conservatory of Music in 1991. The next year, he joined a four-piece band, Nitre Pit, in San Francisco as its drummer. When the band's two guitarists left, Saunier and Nitre Pit's bassist, Rob Fisk, reformed as an "elastic, hyper-expressive" band to fulfill Nitre Pit's extant scheduled shows, which later became Deerhoof when Slim Moon of Kill Rock Stars signed the group in 1995. Saunier moved to New York with two suitcases and has said that he does not own many possessions. As a drummer, he says, things he touches tend to break.

Outside of Deerhoof, Saunier's bands include Mystical Weapons (a duo with Sean Lennon) and a collaboration with Brian Chippendale, about which a documentary, Checking in at 20, was produced. He also formed Nervous Cop with drummer Zach Hill and harpist Joanna Newsom, and bands with members of Erase Errata and Rainer Maria, soundtracked a film by Martha Colburn, and collaborated with Yonatan Gat on a reinterpretation of Antonín Dvořák's American Quartet. Saunier is a member of the indie rock supergroup Big Walnuts Yonder alongside bassist Mike Watt (Minutemen, fIREHOSE), guitarist Nels Cline (Wilco) and guitarist/vocalist Nick Reinhart (Tera Melos).

He has produced albums including Xiu Xiu's The Air Force and Always, Marc Ribot's Ceramic Dog's Your Turn, Sholi's self-titled album and People Get Ready's Physiques, remixed tracks for Shy Hunters and WOOM, and appeared on albums including Zach Hill's Face Tat and Dan Webb's Sunshine/Dialogue. In 2016, Saunier collaborated with American Brazilian composer Marcos Balter, in which they wrote songs for Deerhoof and Ensemble Dal Niente.

On 8 April 2024, Saunier announced his solo debut album We Sang, Therefore We Were, which was released on 26 April by Joyful Noise Recordings.

== Kit and technique ==
Saunier uses a minimal drum kit, at times only consisting of a kick drum, snare and a cymbal, a set-up inspired in part by the kit and playing style of Questlove (The Roots). Other main influences have been the jazz drummers Brian Blade and Tony Williams. In 2008, Saunier said that he rarely practices, mainly for lack of time. When he writes songs, he usually considers the drum part last and is more concerned about the other components of the song including its technical elements. His interest and judgement in the latter came from his experience starting Deerhoof without producers, a record label, or much outside help.

== Personal life ==
Politically, Saunier is an outspoken critic of capitalism. As of 2021, he resides in Tucson, Arizona.

Saunier was previously married to his Deerhoof bandmate Satomi Matsuzaki; their marriage ended prior to 2013.

Saunier was diagnosed with Tourette syndrome while in college, and has described drumming as a source of relief from its symptoms.
