= Third Coast Percussion =

American percussion ensemble

- Origin: Chicago Illinois, United States
- Genres: Classical Contemporary, Percussion
- Years active: 2004–present
- Labels: Mode Records; New Focus Recordings; New Amsterdam Records; Parlour Tapes; Cedille Records
- Members: Sean Connors; Robert Dillon; Peter Martin; David Skidmore
- Past members: Owen Clayton Condon; Anthony Calabrese; Jake Nissly
- Website: www.thirdcoastpercussion.com

Third Coast Percussion is an American percussion ensemble based in Chicago, Illinois, United States.

Specializing in contemporary classical music, the group is composed of Sean Connors, Robert Dillon, Peter Martin, and David Skidmore. Its album, Third Coast Percussion | Steve Reich, won a Grammy Award for Best Chamber Music/Small Ensemble Performance, making the ensemble the first percussion group to win in a chamber music category.

== Performance history ==
In 2004, original members Anthony Calabrese, Robert Dillon, Jacob Nissly, and David Skidmore were percussionists with the Civic Orchestra of Chicago as well as students of Northwestern University, forming a chamber percussion group that performed at Chicago Public Schools and city colleges as part of the schools' education programs.

The first shows by Third Coast Percussion for general audiences were performed in the summer of 2005 at Northwestern and the Music Institute of Chicago in Evanston. Nissly left for graduate studies at the Juilliard School, replaced bye Peter Martin, a percussionist pursuing a doctoral degree at Northwestern. Former member Owen Clayton Condon, an alumnus from Northwestern and professor at Northeastern University, took Calabrese's place. Early performances were influenced by the small venues they performed in, such as the Empty Bottle, that limited the group's repertoire and number of instruments. Sean Connors assumed Condon's place in the ensemble in 2013.

Third Coast Percussion was the Ensemble-in-Residence at the University of Notre Dame's DeBartolo Performing Arts Center from 2013-2018. It performs multiple recitals annually as part of the DeBartolo Performing Arts Center's Presenting Series season and is the Ensemble-in-Residence at Denison University.

== Collaborators, labels ==
Beginning with Augusta Read Thomas in 2012, Third Coast Percussion has commissioned works from Philip Glass, Missy Mazzoli, Gemma Peacocke, Flutronix, Jlin, Tyondai Braxton, Devonté Hynes, Georg Friedrich Haas, Donnacha Dennehy, Glenn Kotche, Christopher Cerrone, and David T. Little, as well as collaborating with engineers at the University of Notre Dame, architects at the Frank Lloyd Wright Foundation, dancers at Hubbard Street Dance Chicago, musicians performing mbira music of Zimbabwe's Shona people, indie rockers and footwork producers.

The ensemble has released albums on the Mode, New Focus, New Amsterdam, and Cedille record labels. The quartet endorses and performs exclusively with Pearl/Adams Musical Instruments, Zildjian Cymbals, Remo Drumheads, and Vic Firth sticks and mallets.

== Grammy award, nominations ==
In 2017, Third Coast Percussion won a Grammy Award for Best Chamber Music/Small Ensemble Performance for its album Third Coast Percussion | Steve Reich, released on Cedille Records, becoming the first percussion group to win in a chamber music category. The album featured music by American composer Steve Reich in honor of his eightieth birthday. Reich said that when he "heard the Third Coast CD of a number of my pieces...I thought, 'Wow, you know, I've never heard them this way.' You have to literally lean in to listen. Which is a very good way to listen. And the whole thing just knocked my socks off." The ensemble performed music from the album at the 59th Annual Grammy Awards, joined by jazz saxophonist Ravi Coltrane. The group was nominated for Grammy's four more times, beginning with a nomination in the composer category in 2021.

== Repertoire ==
=== Original music ===
- Condon: Double Helix (2005)
- Condon: Fractalia (2011)
- Condon: Quadruple Helix (2005)
- Dillon: Heaven We Need (2020)
- Dillon: ...hence the term, well-adjusted. (2021)
- Dillon: Mini-Moutons (2020)
- Dillon: One Concession to Glee (2020)
- Dillon: Ordering-instincts (2014)
- Martin: BEND (2016)
- Martin: WAVES (2014)
- Skidmore: Aliens with Extraordinary Abilities (2016)
- Skidmore: Common Patterns in Uncommon Time (2011)
- Skidmore: Echoes (2003)
- Skidmore: Fanfare for a New Audience (2009)
- Skidmore: In Contact (2006)
- Skidmore: Ritual Music (2004)
- Skidmore: Trying (2014)
- Third Coast Percussion: In Practice (2022)
- Third Coast Percussion: Niagara (2016)
- Third Coast Percussion: Paddle to the Sea (2017)
- Third Coast Percussion: Reaction Yield (2016)

=== Works commissioned ===
- 100 different composers: RENGA:Cage:100
- Christopher Adler: Pines Long Slept in Sunshine
- Timo Andres: Austerity Measures (2013)
- Marcos Balter: dark rooms (2007)
- Matthew Barnson: Percussion Quartet (2006)
- Mark Berger: Percussion Quartet (2006)
- Martin Bresnick: A Message from the Emperor
- Kirsten Broberg: Constellations (2008)
- Christopher Cerrone: Goldbeater's Skin (2017)
- Danny Clay: playbook (2015)
- Adam Cuthbert: democracy looks like
- Thomas DeLio: ...sound / shivering / silence II
- Donnacha Dennehy: Surface Tension (2016)
- Christopher Fischer-Lochhead: On Tenterhooks (2012-2013)
- Ted Hearne: Thaw (2009)
- Ben Hjertmann: Automatic Glitch (2014)
- Ryan Ingebritsen: Improvisation in an Altered State (2013)
- Derek Jacoby: We've Gotta Find It (2006)
- Jlin: Perspectives (2020, commissioned by the Boulanger Initiative)
- Glenn Kotche: Stones Flow
- Glenn Kotche: Wild Sound (2014)
- Andrew McKenna Lee: Like A Sick, Breathing Tambura (2006)
- David T. Little: Haunt of Last Nightfall (2010)
- José Martínez: Two Questions About Time (2017)
- Marc Mellits: Gravity (2013)
- Otto Muller: Escoria (2010)
- Anthony Pateras: Lost Compass (2010)
- Jonathan Pfeffer: Jonathan was killed in battle against the Philistines
- Christopher Preissing: Point Line Space I: Sticks and Stones
- Annika Socolofsky: bellow (2017)
- Stephen Syverud: Snow Creatures
- Augusta Read Thomas: Resounding Earth (2012)
- Augusta Read Thomas: Selene
- Augusta Read Thomas: Wonderful Things! (Tomorrow Sings with Hope)
- Aaron Travers: Deep Carving (2006)
- Ivan Trevino: Watercolor Sun (2023)
- Dmitri Tymoczko: Röckdöts (2013)
- Andrea Venet: Bulldog (2021)
- Katherine Young: just water, no lemon (2017)
- Philip Glass: Aguas da Amazonia (2025)

=== Discography ===
Original albums

- Ritual Music (2008)
- John Cage - The Works for Percussion, vol. 2 (2012)
- Resounding Earth (2013)
- Haunt of Last NightFall (2014)
- Unknown Symmetry (2013)
- Third Coast Percussion | Steve Reich (2016)
- Phillipe Manoury - Book of Keyboards (2017)
- Paddle to the Sea (2018)
- Perpetulum (2019)
- Fields (2019)
- Quartered (2020)
- Archetypes (2021)
- Perspectives (2022)
- Currents/Volume 1 (2022)
- Between Breaths (2023)

Albums featuring Third Coast Percussion

- Luminous (2016) - Lei Liang
- The Stone Tapestry (2017) - Jeff Herriott
- Haunt of Last Nightfall (2014) - David T. Little and Third Coast Percussion
- Thaw (2013) - Ted Hearne and various artists
- Of Being is a Bird (2016) - Augusta Read Thomas
- Astral Canticle (2015) - Augusta Read Thomas
- Ritual Incantations (2017) - Augusta Read Thomas
- Fields (2019) - Devonté Hynes
