= Rhythm of Structure =

Art exhibition series

- Rhythm of Structure Mathematics, Art and Poetic Reflection: Bowery and Beyond catalog cover illustration graphic, 2011
- Year: 2003 – present
- Location: Fire Patrol #5 Gallery, Wilmer Jennings Gallery, Bowery Poetry Club, Ringling College of Art and Design, Antioch College, Museum of Science & Industry
- Website: rhythmofstructure.com

Rhythm of Structure is a multimedia interdisciplinary project founded in 2003. It features a series of exhibitions, performances, and academic projects that explore the interconnecting structures and process of mathematics and art, and language, as way to advance a movement of mathematical expression across the arts, across creative collaborative communities celebrating the rhythm and patterns of both ideas of the mind and the physical reality of nature.

== Introduction ==
Rhythm of Structure, as an expanding series of art exhibitions, performances, videos/films and publications created and curated by multimedia mathematical artist and writer John Sims, explores and celebrates the intersecting structures of mathematics, art, community, and nature. Sims also created Recoloration Proclamation featuring the installation, The Proper Way to Hang a Confederate Flag (2004).

From his catalog essay from the Rhythm of Structure: Mathematics, Art and Poetic exhibition, Sims sets the curatorial theme where he writes: "Mathematics, as a parameter of human consciousness in an indispensable conceptual technology, essential is seeing beyond the retinal and knowing beyond the intuitive. The language and process of mathematics, as elements of, foundation for art, inform an analytic expressive condition that inspires a visual reckoning for a convergence: from the illustrative to the metaphysical to the poetic. And in the dialectic of visual art call and text performative response, there is an inter-dimensional conversation where the twisting structures of language, vision and human ways give birth to the spiritual lattice of a social geometry, a community constructivism -- a place of connections, where emotional calculations meet spirited abstraction."

First premiering at the Fire Patrol No.5 Gallery in 2003, with the show Rhythm of Structure: MathArt in Harlem. This interdisciplinary project has featured numerous exhibitions around the country collaborating with many notable artists, writers, and musicians including: Sol LeWitt, Adrian Piper, Dorothea Rockburne, Al Loving, Joe Overstreet, Howardena Pindell, Helaman Ferguson, John Hiigli, Vandorn Hinnant, Karen Finley, Dread Scott, Paul D. Miller, Bob Holman, Kate Rushin, Roman Verostko, Joan Waltemath, Tara Betts, Brent Collins, Mike Field, Kazmier Maslanka, Ken Hiratsuka, Yael Acher Moriano, Richard Kostelanetz, Kristin Prevallet, John Sims, and former U.S. Poet Laureate Mark Strand.

In addition to the exhibitions, another major aim of Rhythm of Structure is the building of an interdisciplinary creative community around the intersection of mathematics and all forms of art, as it might inspire new art, innovation art and mathematics education, and increased respect and understanding of the rhythm and structure of nature itself. Such community experiences are created through call and response performances, social media and special video music projects such as The Rhythm of Structure and The Pi Day Anthem featuring John Sims and Vi Hart .

== Background ==
Rhythm of Structure has its beginnings in Sims’ work as one of the international curators for the exhibition Science in the Arts - Art in the Sciences, a citywide exhibition, in conjunction with the UNESCO-ICSU World Conference of Science, Budapest, Hungary in 1999.

This led to the exhibition, MathArt/ArtMath, curated by John Sims (then Coordinator of Mathematics at Ringling) and Kevin Dean, at the Selby Gallery Ringling College of Art and Design in 2002. This show presented a general survey of art inspired and framed by mathematics ideas of mostly American modern and contemporary artists, as well as mathematicians working in the area of visual mathematics. The theme of the show was designed to examine the complexity and diversity of the meaning of mathematical art. The MathArt/ArtMath exhibition featured: Josef Albers, Thomas Banchoff, Richard Anuszkiewicz, Manuelo Baez, Jhane Barnes, Max Bill, Mel Bochner, Brent Collins, David Davis, George Deem, Agnes Denes, M.C. Escher, Fred Eversley, Shannon Fagan, Helaman Ferguson, Mike Field, Charles Gaines, Paulus Gerdes, Bathsheba Grossman, Al Held, John Hiigli, Slavik Jablan, Alfred Jensen, Andrienne Klein, Sol LeWitt, Arthur Lee Loeb, Paul D. Miller a.k.a. DJ Spooky, Marlena Novak, Joe Overstreet, Howardena Pindell, Richard Purdy, Tony Robbin, Dorothea Rockburne, Frank Rothkamm, Irene Rousseau, Carlo Sequin, John Sims, John Sullivan, Jack Tworkov, Roman Verostko, and John Waltemath. There was a brochure and video produced for this exhibition.

After the MathArt/ArtMath exhibition, Sims began working on a text about the nature of mathematical art leading to his chapter, Trees, Roots and a Brain: A Metaphorical Foundation for Mathematical Art, in the book Mathematics and Culture II: Visual Perfection: Mathematics and Creativity. In his chapter, he presents his ideas on the interconnection of mathematics, art and nature, setting the stage for his next group of exhibitions called Rhythm of Structure.

== Exhibitions ==
=== Rhythm of Structure: MathArt in Harlem (2003) ===
MathArt in Harlem, January 2003, Fire Patrol #5 Gallery in Harlem New York City, New York, featured artists Audrey Bennet, Brent Collins, Agnes Denes, Helaman Ferguson, Charles Gaines, Bathsheba Grossman, John Hiigli, Ken Hiratsuka, Adrienne Klein, Sol LeWitt, John Little, Al Loving, Marlena Novak, Joe Overstreet, Howardena Pindell, John Powell, Tony Robbin, Irene Rousseau, Clifford Singer, John Sims, and Joan Waltemath.

=== Rhythm of Structure: The Mathematical Aesthetic (2004) ===
The Mathematical Aesthetic, 2004, Wilmer Jennings Gallery in New York City, New York, included artists: Joe Overstreet, John Biggers, Brent Collins, Lisa Corinne Davis, Fred Eversley, Terri Foster, Charles Gaines, Simon Gouverneur, James Little, Al Loving, Vandorn Hinnant, Scott Johnson, Howardena Pindell, John Sims, Kevin Sipp, Al Smith, Joyce Wellman, and Jack White.

=== Rhythm of Structure: Beyond the Mathematics (2007) ===
In association with the Knotting Mathematics and Art: Conference in Low Dimensional Topology and Mathematical Art at University of South Florida in November 2007, there were three exhibitions of Rhythm of Structure: Beyond the Mathematics, curated by John Sims, which were hosted at the Centre Gallery, Museum of Science & Industry in Tampa, and the Oliver Gallery, respectively. Featured artists for this exhibition included: Davide Cervone, Brent Collins, Alex Feingold, Helaman Ferguson, Mike Field, Nat Friedman, Chaim Goodman-Strauss, Gary Greenfield, Bathsheba Grossman, George W. Hart, Slavik Jablan, Sol LeWitt, Charles O. Perry, Tony Robbin, Radmilla Sazdanovic, John Sims, Carlo Sequin, and Peter Swedenborg.

A review of the conference and exhibition was also published in the Journal of Mathematics and the Arts.

=== Rhythm of Structure: Mathematics, Art and Poetic Reflection at Bowery Poetry Club (2009-10) ===
Mathematics, Art and Poetic Reflection, 2009-2010, premiered at the Bowery Poetry Club in New York City, New York. This exhibition consisted of nine shows, each show a month long typically featuring two artists or a small group. Featured poets or performers were invited to respond to the works with a performance at the closing of the show. The entire exhibition featured over 70 artists and performers, plus an art class from Brooklyn Academy of Science and the Environment, and students of the Rhythm of Structure Class at NYU Tisch School of the Arts. The complete exhibition led to a published catalog and documentary film, which screened at the Sarasota Film Festival in 2012. The entire exhibition then traveled as a summary show to Ringling College of Art and Design, as well as Antioch College in 2011.

Squares and Circles featuring John Hiigli and Vandorn Hinnant

This inaugural show featured the duet paintings: Chrome 163 by John Hiigli, and What Euclid intended for us to know by Vandorn Hinnant. Responding poems/poets: Circular Vibration by Christina Schmitt, The Digital Organic by Alan Gilbert, The Square Transformed by Christina Schmitt, and Poemedy Squircular (Excerpt) by Summer Hill Seven.

Lines and Curves featuring Paulus Gerdes/John Sims and Ken Hiratsuka

This show featured rope installation and stone carving: A Roped Mirrored Curve by Paulus Gerdes/John Sims, Chained Universe by Ken Hiratsuka. Responding poems/poets: Quadrants by Kristin Prevallet, Images of Devonian Age by Pooh Kaye, and The Curvature of Green by Shanxing Wang.

The Cartesian MathArt Hive featuring The Hive Artists

The Cartesian MathArt Hive created by John Sims based on the rotations of his piece SquareRoots of a Tree in a collaboration of the following works: Haloed Angel Study: Spark by Dorothea Rockburne, Eseau on Globe Crossing by Joyce Wellman, Chrome 151: 3 Spheres by John Hiigli, Isometric Systems in Isotropic Space-Map Projection: The Cube by Agnes Denes, Square Roots of a Tree by John Sims, Squaring the Circle: Heaven in Earth by Pam Tuczyn, Drawing 13 by Roman Verostko, Poincare-double lace by Carlo Sequin, Iterations by Mike Field, Enlightened Vision #10 by Christina Schmitt, Kelien-Fountain by Davide Cevone, Root Three Fractal SpiralGram by Vandorn Hinnant, Zero by Kevin Dean, Tree Root of a Fractal by John Sims, Spheres by Susan Happersett, Fish by Ken Hiratsuka, Drawn with a Compass, Chopstick and a Pen by Howardena Pindell, Our Days are Numbered! by Robert Fitterman, Mapping of the Universe by Faybiene Miranda, Is Numerology Math by Chris Funkhouser, Where Come Together by Chris Funkhouser, Alphabetical Mutability by Tatiana Bonch, and One by Marcella Durand.

The Cartesian MathArt Hive was also featured in a Journal of Mathematics and Arts paper.

You Lie featuring Paul D. Miller and Dread Scott

This exhibition featured the digital works on paper, You Lie by Paul D. Miller and Poll Dance by Dread Scott. Responding Poems/Poets: Spam A Lot (Viagra for Joe Wilson) by LaTasha N. Nevada Diggs, Survey by LaTasha N. Nevada Diggs, Coolant System by Alan Gilbert, and Count Me In by Kelly Zen-Yie Tsai.

The Square Root of Love featuring Karen Finley and John Sims

This duet show featured: Many Moods of Love by Karen Finley and Square Root of Love by John Sims. Responding Poems/Poets:The Square Root of Love: Calculating the HEART of Things by JoAnne Growney, and Learning To Be My Father's Son or 16 Things I Could Never Tell My Father by Regie Cabico.

John Sims' part of exhibition developed into a Valentine's Day wine-poetry-film project premiering in Paris in 2017.

Selected Infinite Extensions Arbitrarily Constrained featuring Sol LeWitt and Adrian Piper

Selected Infinite Extensions Arbitrarily Constrained featuring Sol LeWitt and Adrian Piper was a duet show that featured the wall installations: Drawing #163 by Sol LeWitt, and Vanishing Point #1 by Adrian Piper. Responding Poems/Poets: Sociedad Anonima by Mónica de la Torre, Two Poems Squared by Bob Holman, Dear Morning Light dear visiwind by Bob Holman, Terra Quad by Edwin Torres, MathArtPoem: A LeWitt/Piper Response by John Sims/Rhythm of Structure Class/NYU, For the Girl Who Was Asked to Write a Poem About Me and, as Usual, Wanted to Write a Poem About Her Heart Instead by Eboni Hogan, The Elevator by Mark Strand, and Empty by Jon Sands.

Selected Infinite Extensions Arbitrarily Constrained was reviewed by Art in America Magazine.

(20, 21, 29): An Assignment featuring the Students of Brooklyn Academy of Science and Environment

(20, 21, 29): An Assignment, a visualization of the Pythagorean triple (20, 21, 29) created by art students with teacher Jennifer Lemish at the Brooklyn Academy of Science and the Environment. Responding Poems/Poets: 21 Reasons Why I hate Math by Shappy Seasholtz, and 29 Solutions For Writers, by People Who Know Better Than Me by Cristin O'Keefe Aptowicz.

Mathematical Graffiti featuring Fernando Mora, John Sims with Kyle Goen, Mark Turgeon, and the Bowery Poetry Club Patrons

Mathematical Graffiti featured: Fernando Mora, John Sims with Kyle Goen, Mark Turgeon, and the Bowery Poetry Club Patrons. Poetic Responses: Mutually Inverse Operations: Mathematical Poetry on the Occasion of the Mathematical Graffiti Wall by Gregory Vincent St. Thomasino, Proportional Poems by Kaz Maslanka, Graffiti Mathemaku by Bob Grumman, 33 Symmetry Axes x 40 Orthogonal Triples: or, Free Will, Revisited by Stephanie Strickland, Who Counts, Counts by Stephanie Strickland, and Notes on Numbers by Richard Kostelanetz.

Gregory Vincent St. Thomasino featured portions of this exhibition in his blog.

The HyperQuilt featuring Helen Beamish, Elaine Ellison, Suzanne Gould, John Sims, Ella Toy, Diana Venters, and Paula Wynter

The HyperQuilt featured: Helen Beamish, Elaine Ellison, Suzanne Gould, John Sims, Ella Toy, Diana Venters, and Paula Wynter. Responding Poems/Poets: The Language of Quilts by Tara Betts, The Last Time by Adam Falkner and Jeanann Verlee, We Come From Farm People by Kate Rushin, The Math Poem: Along The Learning Curve by Kate Rushin.

Rhythm of Structure: Bowery and Beyond (2011)

The entire nine Rhythm of Structure shows at the Bowery Poetry Club were brought together as one united Rhythm of Structure: Bowery and Beyond exhibition at the Selby Gallery at Ringling College of Art and Design in February, 2011.

After the Selby Gallery showing at Ringling, it was shown later that year at the Antioch College, from May to November 2011. The Dayton City Paper reviewed the exhibition and featured an article in their local newspaper.

== Publications ==
Rhythm of Structure Mathematics, Art and Poetic Reflection: Bowery and Beyond - Exhibition Catalogue

In 2011, the catalog Rhythm of Structure Mathematics, Art and Poetic Reflection: Bowery and Beyond was produced by Selby Gallery and Antioch College Herndon Gallery at Ringling College of Art and Design and John Sims, containing all 9 of the Mathematics, Art and Poetic Reflection exhibits. Sarasota Herald Tribune previewed and reviewed the exhibition catalog at Selby Gallery, and the film at the Sarasota Film Festival.

Rhythm of Structure: MathArt in the African Diaspora - International Review of African American Art

In 2004, John Sims and Juliette Harris co-edited a special issue, MathArt in the African Diaspora, for the International Review of African American Art which featured artists: John Sims, Al Smith, Juliette Harris, Ron Eglash, Brent Collins, Andrea Pollan, Howardena Pindell, and Paulus Gerdes.

== NYU course ==
In the spring of 2010, in connection to the Rhythm of Structure: Mathematics, Art and Poetic Reflection at the Bowery Poetry Club, John Sims was invited to teach a course for the department of Art and Public Policy at Tisch School of the Arts. The course, "Rhythm of Structure: Trees, Flags and Clock", examined the mechanisms/structures of developing John Sims' three large-scale interdisciplinary art projects (as case studies), which explored issues of social justice, community building, and the politics of grand scale works. With these multi-level projects-in-progress, which intersect the space of art with mathematics, visual politics, and social networking, the course investigated the various strategies and challenges in creating a system of objects-texts-sounds-works that employs the tools of social organizing, media, technology, culture jamming, performance, poetry, and satire.

The student final group project was a collective video-poetry response to the Sol LeWitt and Adrian Piper exhibition, Selected Infinite Extensions Arbitrarily Constrained, which was up at that point at the Rhythm of Structure exhibition at the Bowery Poetry Club. The video and live student readings were also presented at the closing of the show.

== Film ==
Mathematics, Art and Poetic Reflection was made into a documentary, Rhythm of Structure: Bowery and Beyond, and presented at Sarasota Film Festival in 2012. The film was also previewed and reviewed by the Saratosa Herald Tribune.

In connection to the film screening, there was are dinner, art performance reception featuring John Sims and Karen Finley's Square of Love installation from the Rhythm of Structure exhibition at the Bowery Poetry Club. The dinner featured a special menu prepared by Chef Gene Marra inspired by roots and love. The performance program included Twinkle, the late Kenny Drew Jr., Thomas Carabasi, Eleonora Lvov, Nate Jacobs, Michael Mendez, Kyleelise Holmes, Greg Tate and Bahiyyah Maroon.

== Reviews ==
There have been a number of reviews for Rhythm of Structure:

- A paper covering the Knotting Mathematics and Art: Conference in Low Dimensional Topology and Mathematical Art at University of South Florida in November 2007 appeared in the Journal of Mathematics and Arts.
- At the Bowery Poetry Club show, Sol LeWitt and Adrian Piper's exhibition with featured response by Mark Strand was review in Art in America by John Reed in March 2010.
- The Cartesian MathArt Hive piece featured in the Rhythm of Structure: Mathematics, Art and Poetic Reflection (2009–10) exhibition was covered by a journal paper, April 2010, in the Journal of Mathematics and Arts.
- Gregory Vincent St. Thomasino featured an element of the Mathematics, Art and Poetic Reflection poetry presentation his blog in April 2010.
- Sarasota Herald Tribune writer Marty Fugate previewed the Ringling College of Art and Design exhibition at Selby Gallery and Rhythm of Structure film which screened at the Sarasota Film Festival in April 2012.
- The Antioch College showing of Rhythm of Structure was covered in April 2012 by the Jane A. Black for the Dayton City Paper.
- SQR Magazine reviewed The Square Root of Love, featured in the Rhythm of Structure: Mathematics, Art and Poetic Reflection (2009–10) exhibition, at the Bowery Poetry Club in April 2012.

== See also ==
- Journal of Mathematics and the Arts
- The Bridges Organization
