= Ensemble Dal Niente =

American classical music ensemble

- Origin: Chicago, Illinois, United States
- Genres: Contemporary classical
- Years active: 2005–present
- Labels: New Amsterdam; New Focus; Navona; Parlour Tapes+; Carrier
- Members: Members
- Website: www.dalniente.com

Ensemble Dal Niente is a contemporary classical music ensemble based in Chicago, Illinois, that performs acoustic and electroacoustic chamber music.

== History ==
Ensemble Dal Niente was founded in 2005 by a group of graduate student composers at Northwestern University. In their first five years of existence, Dal Niente programmed compositions by emerging composers and, as their capacity grew, performed classics of the contemporary repertoire such as Gérard Grisey's Partiels. Dal Niente is considered one of multiple groups responsible for an increase in attention towards Chicago's new music scene in the early 21st Century; in 2010, the Chicago Tribune noted that "Dal Niente is a model of what contemporary music needs, but seldom gets, to reach and engage a wider public".

Ensemble Dal Niente first performed at the Darmstädter Ferienkurse in Darmstadt, Germany in 2010. After winning the festival's Kranichstein Stipend Prize, they returned in In 2012 and were awarded the Kranichstein Prize for Interpretation. In 2014, Dal Niente gave the Darmstädter Ferienkurse's festival-closing concert in an evening-length concert in the style of Dal Niente's "Party" events in Chicago.

Dal Niente has collaborated with and profiled composers through their "Proximity" portrait concerts. The Proximity series has included collaborations with Kaija Saariaho (2009), Mark-Anthony Turnage (2010), Mark Andre (2012), Chinary Ung (2012), Chaya Czernowin (2012), Johannes Kreidler (2013), Raphaël Cendo (2014), Mathias Spahlinger (2015), Rebecca Saunders (2015, 2022), Enno Poppe (2016), George Lewis (2017), Erin Gee (2018), Andile Khumalo (2021).

Dal Niente's busier 2012–2013 concert season included the ensemble's first of multiple ventures to Latin America, for the Festival Internacional Chihuahua. In December, listeners gathered at Mayne Stage for Dal Niente's "Hard Music, Hard Liquor" series, a nod to the ensemble's tradition of selecting difficult music. In February, Dal Niente would commence a four-year-long project with the rock band Deerhoof, the band's drummer/composer Greg Saunier, and composer Marcos Balter with a concert of new music performed at Merkin Concert Hall's Ecstatic Music Festival. For the concert, "Deerhoof drummer Greg Saunier created a dazzling suite of songs by his band called Deerhoof Chamber Variations that Dal Niente performed, radically reconfiguring the music while retaining its quirky melodic shapes". An album featuring Dal Niente and Deerhoof with said compositions by Balter and Saunier will be released on New Amsterdam Records in April, 2016. February 2013 also marked Dal Niente's first presentation of Georg Friedrich Haas's work for large ensemble and theatrical lighting, "in vain". A subsequent performance of "in vain" in Washington, DC was deemed "mind-bending" by The Washington Post. The 2012-13 season was completed with a July 4 performance at the Ravinia Festival and a return to Latin America for the inaugural MusicArte Festival in Panama City, Panama. At the close of the 2012–2013 season, Dal Niente was profiled by the Chicago Tribune as a group of "super-musicians".

In recent years, Dal Niente has also performed at the Library of Congress (Washington, DC), the Fromm Concerts at Harvard University, St.Paul Chamber Orchestra's Liquid Music Series (Minnesota), Pritzker Pavilion (Chicago), Chicago Cultural Center, Harold Washington Library (Chicago), a return to the Darmstädter Ferienkurse (Germany), and a tour of Latin America that took members to the Library of the Bank of the Republic (Colombia), Universidad de Javeriana (Colombia), Foro Internacional de Musica Nueva (Mexico), and the MusicArte Festival (Panama). Dal Niente's effort to work with emerging composers has led to composition workshops, classes, and performances at the universities of Northwestern, Chicago, Harvard, Stanford, Indiana, Illinois, Western Michigan, Bowling Green, Minnesota, Illinois State, and Williams College. In addition to their Proximity portrait series, Dal Niente has also collaborated on performances with composers Marcos Balter, Eliza Brown, Anthony Cheung, Aaron Einbond, Brian Ferneyhough, Ashley Fure, Evan Johnson, Mikel Kuehn, Lee Hyla, George E. Lewis, Bernard Rands, Augusta Read Thomas, Greg Saunier, Hans Thomalla, Jay Alan Yim, and Katherine Young, among others. The ensemble has commissioned new works for ensemble from composers including Drew Baker, Marcos Balter, Christopher Biggs, Kirsten Broberg, Raphaël Cendo, Lisa Coons, Aaron Einbond, Natacha Diels, Christopher Fisher-Lochhead, Ashley Fure, Pierce Gradone, Evan Johnson, Morgan Krauss, Mikel Kuehn, Jeff Parker, Mauricio Pauly, Christopher Trapani, and Greg Saunier.

Dal Niente's 2015–2016 season celebrates its 10th anniversary, culminating in the 2016 iteration of their "Party" series. During a midseason tour of Chicago, Boston, and New York, the ensemble's New York performance was reviewed by The New York Times.

== Members ==
- Michael Lewanski (conductor)
- Emma Hospelhorn (flute)
- Constance Volk (flute)
- Andrew Nogal (oboe/english horn)
- Alejandro T. Acierto (clarinet)
- Katie Jimoh (clarinet)
- Ben Roidl-Ward (bassoon)
- Matthew Oliphant (horn)
- Greg Beyer (percussion)
- Kyle Flens (percussion)
- Winston Choi (piano)
- Mabel Kwan (piano)
- Amanda DeBoer Bartlett (voice)
- Carrie Henneman Shaw (voice)
- J. Austin Wulliman (violin)
- MingHuan Xu (violin)
- Caitlin Edwards (violin)
- Hanna Hurwitz (violin)
- Tarn Travers (violin)
- Theo Ramsey (violin/viola)
- Ammie Brod (viola)
- Mark Buchner (bass)
- Jesse Langen (guitar)
- Juan Horie (cello)
- Chris Wild (cello)
- Ben Melsky (harp)

== Discography ==
- Object/Animal (Sideband, 2022)
- Confined/Speak (New Focus, 2021)
- Ben Melsky/Dal Niente (with harpist Ben Melsky, New Focus, 2019)
- George Lewis: Assemblage (New World, 2017)
- Mikel Kuehn: Object Shadow (New Focus, 2016)
- Balter/Saunier (with the band Deerhoof and composer Marcos Balter, New Amsterdam, 2016)
- Diligence is to Magic as Progress is to Flight (with composer Katherine Young and violinist J. Austin Wulliman, Parlour Tapes+, 2014)
- Abhanden (with cellist Chris Wild, Navona, 2014)
- (without Words (with composer Aaron Einbond, Carrier, 2014)
- Hot (with saxophonist Ryan Muncy, New Focus, 2013)
