= Kristin Prevallet =

American poet, essayist, and teacher

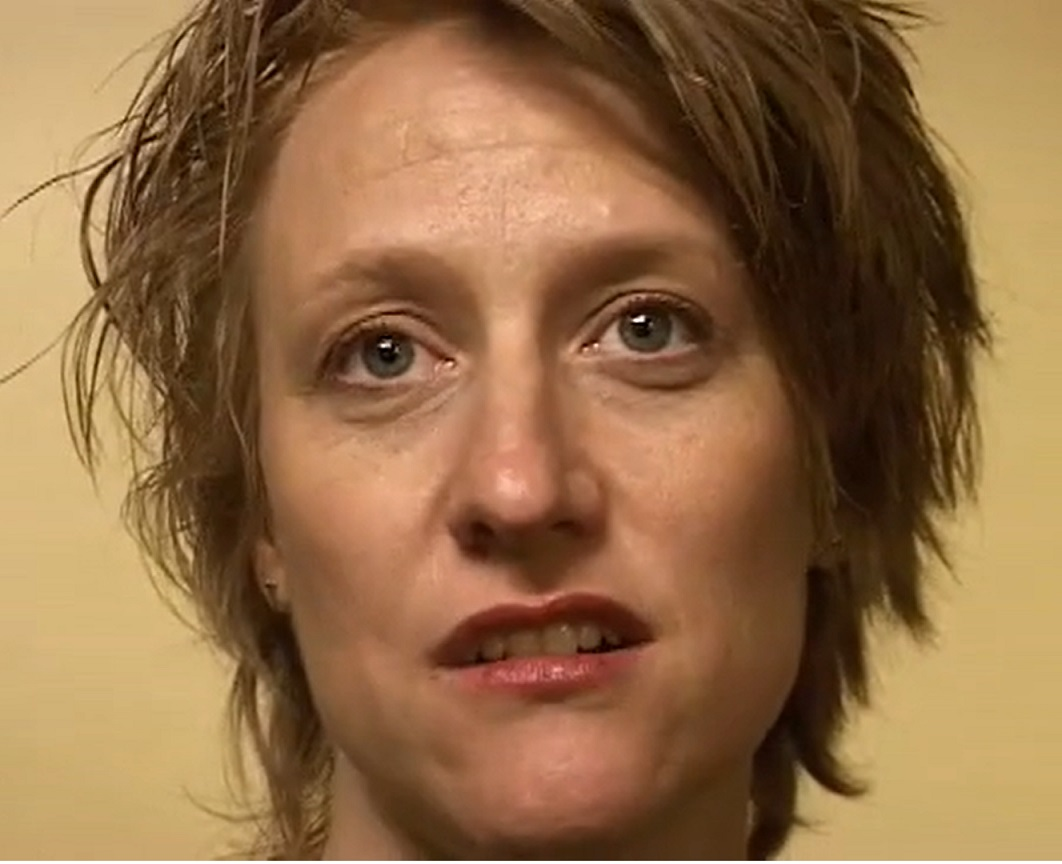
Kristin Prevallet in Speaking Portraits

Kristin Prevallet (b. 1966) is an American poet, essayist, and teacher. Her poetic work incorporates conceptual writing and trance, and her performances are rooted in feminist performance art and spoken word. Everywhere Here and in Brooklyn, I, Afterlife: Essay in Mourning Time, and Trance Poetics are among her poetic books.

== Early life ==
Prevallet grew up in Denver, Colorado. Her parents were both public school teachers. Before dying of cancer at the age of 46, her mother fulfilled her vows to become a Sister of Loretto. Prevallet studied poetics with Robert Creeley and media studies with Tony Conrad at the University at Buffalo.

Since the early 1990s, she has been teaching writing and literature courses for a variety of universities and art institutions including Bard College's Writing and Thinking Workshop, Pratt Institute, Naropa University, Poet's House, and The Poetry Project. From 2003 to 2006, she worked with Anne Waldman and Bob Holman to start a school for poets at the Bowery Poetry Club, the venue which defined the New York downtown poetry scene in the late 1990s and early 2000s.

== Writing ==
At the University of Buffalo, Prevallet catalogued the archive of Helen Adam and her scholarly archive is a part of The Poetry Collection. She edited the definitive volume of Helen Adam’s work (A Helen Adam Reader, published by the National Poetry Foundation), which contextualizes Helen Adam within Robert Duncan's circle in The San Francisco Renaissance, as well as Adam's influence on Allen Ginsberg and the Beat Generation.

Prevallet's poem "Lyric Infiltration" from her second book Scratch Sides: Poetry, Documentation and Image-Text Projects is analyzed by Redell Olson in “Reading and Writing Through Found Materials: From Modernism to Contemporary Practice.” Olson writes, "The use of the term ‘cut-up’ places Prevallet’s procedural work in relation to the strategies of previous writers such as Tristan Tzara, Brion Gysin, and the Oulipo founder Raymond Queneau, and can also be related to the chance-based operational writing of John Cage and Jackson Mac Low. The work of Prevallet is unusual in that it does not dispense with either the term ‘lyric’ or the process of lyric writing but uses it as a basis for her procedural work."

Elizabeth Jane Burnett describes her 2004 performance of "Cruelty and Conquest" at Naropa University as "playing with audience response as a feminist poetry that explores the ways in which the body is transacted."

Her work has been published in numerous anthologies including The Body in Language (CounterPath Press, edited by Edwin Torres), I’ll Drown My Book: Conceptual Writing By Women (University of Iowa Press), Women Poets on Mentorship: Efforts & Affections (Edited by Arielle Greenburg and Rachel Zucker, University of Iowa Press), and Telling it Slant: Avant-garde Poetics of the 1990s (edited by Mark Wallace, University of Alabama Press).

== Selected works ==
=== Poems ===
- "Tale of Caw"
- “Quadrants” (for John Sims' Rhythm of Structure)
- A Glassful of Tea and Sugar in the Mouth
- "I Live in a Borrowed and Often Tender Multiplicity"
- "What She Said" ("Kristin Prevallet." PennSound. Univ. Pennsylvania CPCW.)

=== Books ===
- Trance Poetics, Wide Reality Books, 2014.
- Everywhere Here and in Brooklyn, Belladonna Series, 2012.
- A Helen Adam Reader: Selected Poems, Collages and Music, edited with an introduction by Kristin Prevallet, The National Poetry Foundation, 2007.
- I, Afterlife: Essay in Mourning Time, Essay Press, 2007.
- Shadow Evidence Intelligence, Factory School, 2006.
- Scratch Sides: Poetry, Documentation, and Image-Text Projects, Skanky Possum Press, 2003.
- Perturbation, My Sister: A Study of Max Ernst's Hundred Headless Woman, First Intensity, 1997.

=== Articles and essays ===
- A Burning is Not A Letting Go
- "Writing is Never By Itself Alone: Six Mini Essays on Relational Investigative Poetics." Fence (Spring/Summer 2003)
- "Navigating the New Chaos: Anne Waldman’s Collaborations with Visual Artists" Jacket No. 27 (April 2005); previously published in mark(s) quarterly of the arts.
- "The artful wordiness of materials: Joe Brainard & Poetry"

Jacket No. 16 (March 2002)

- "Interview with Kenward Elmslie" Jacket No. 16 (March 2002)
- "Helen Adam’s Sweet Company: The Collages"

Riding the Meridian v2 n2

- "The Exquisite Extremes of Poetry: Watten and Baraka on the Brink"

Jacket No. 12 (July 2000)

- "Jack Spicer’s Hell in Homage to Creeley"

Jacket No. 7 (April 1999)

- "Gathering vs. Collecting (Correspondence with Jackson MacLow)" Slought Foundation (undated)

== See also ==
- American poetry
