= Bob Grumman =

American poet (1941–2015)

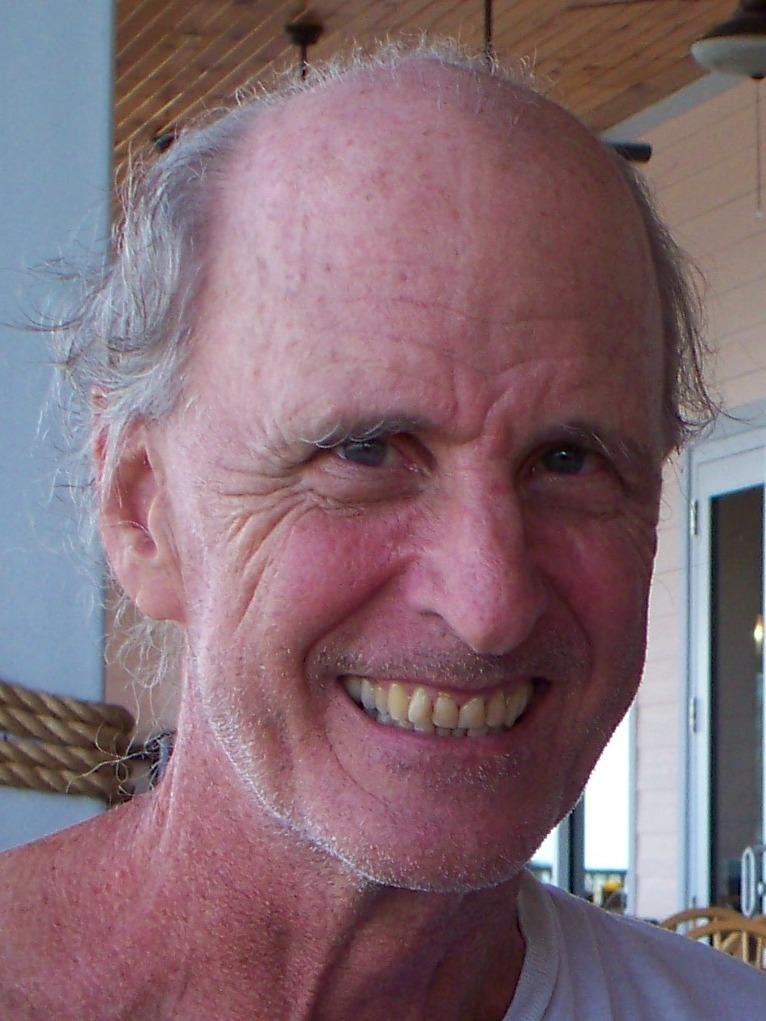
- Bob Grumman, Florida, September 2010
- Born: February 2, 1941; Norwalk, Connecticut
- Died: April 2, 2015 (aged 74); Port Charlotte, Florida
- Writing career
- Genre: mathematical poetry

Bob Grumman (February 2, 1941 – April 2, 2015) was an American mathematical poet and critic of what he called "otherstream" poetry. He was a columnist for Factsheet Five from 1987 to 1992, and wrote a regular column for Small Press Review beginning in 1993. He was a participant in international mail art since 1985. His work was represented in a number of museums and archives devoted to concrete and visual poetry. Considerations of his work have appeared in Meat Epoch, Factsheet Five, Taproot Reviews and elsewhere.

== Life ==
Born in Norwalk, Connecticut, he lived for around 15 years in North Hollywood, California, before moving to Port Charlotte, Florida. He earned an Associate of Arts degree at San Fernando Valley Junior College (1979), and a Bachelor of Arts in English at California State University, Northridge (1982). He served in the U.S. Air Force as a Medic during the Vietnam War from 1960 to 1964, and was a member of the USAF Tennis Team. From 1971 to 1976 he worked at Datagraphic Computer Services in North Hollywood, beginning as a delivery boy and later as a computer operator. He worked as a substitute teacher for 14 years starting in late 1994, mainly at Charlotte High School. He retired in 2008.

== Work ==
Grumman's first book, Poemns, was published in 1966. He went on to publish several books of visual poetry before moving on to mathematical poetry. Grumman describes mathematical poetry as "poetry that does mathematics, rather than merely discusses mathematics (or uses mathematical algorithms to choose its content, as in the Oulipo movement)". Grumman's own "mathemaku" are influenced by the haiku form. Many of them "investigate the results of the long division of such quantities as the actual color blue by such quantities as the dictionary definition of 'blue'" but a few employ other mathematical operations.

In his essays Grumman seeks to foster and promote avant-garde and especially minimalist practices in poetry. His essay "MNMLST poetry: Unacclaimed but flourishing" explored the subtleties in very compressed poems such as Aram Saroyan's single word works. He divides minimalist poetry into two main categories, "infra-verbal" minimalism and "pluraesthetic" minimalism. The former involves fissional, fusional and mutational verbal techniques. The latter includes visual, mathematical and sound poems.

== Professional positions ==
- Columnist for Lost and Found Times, 1994 to 2005
- Contributing Editor for Small Press Review, 1993 to 2015
- Contributing Editor for Poetic Briefs, 1992 to 1997
- Columnist for Factsheet Five, 1987 to 1992
- Publisher, The Runaway Spoon Press, 1983 to 2015
- Co-editor with Crag Hill of two anthologies, Vizpo auf Deutsch (1995) and Writing to be Seen (2001)
- Professional affiliations: member, National Book Critics Circle, National Coalition of Independent Scholars

== Representative shows ==
- IV Bienal Internacional de Poesia VisuaVExperimental, 1993 Moterrey, Mexico
- Paradise Mail Art Exhibition, Belfast, Northern Ireland, c. 1995
- V Bienal Internacional de Poesia VisuaVExperimental, 1996, Mexico City
- Visuelle Poesie, Berlin, 1997
- VI Bienal Internacional de Poesia Experimental, 1999, Mexico City
- 02txt, Art Academy of Cincinnati, Cincinnati, Ohio, 2002
- An American Avant Garde: Second Wave, Ohio State University Libraries, Columbus, Ohio, 2002
- Writing To Be Seen, New York Center for Book Arts, 2002
- Others in Edmonton; Beacon, New York; Port Charlotte, Florida; Miami; Australia

== Publication credits ==
- Score, Kaldron, Lost & Found Times, Modern Haiku, The Experioddicist, Transmog, Meat Epoch, Industrial Sabotage, The Subtle Journal of Raw Coinage, Juxta, The New Orleans Review, Kalligram (Budapest, 2000), Das Haupt (Kiel, Germany, 1995), Freie Zeit Art (Vienna, 1992), Sub Bild (Heidelberg, 1991), and numerous other zines and magazines. Also poetry (mathemaku) and a critical essay (on contemporary minimalist poetry) on-line at Karl Young's light&dust website, and three entries in The Facts on File Companion to 20th-Century American Poetry (2005).

=== Publications ===
- Poemns (visual haiku), privately printed, 1966; reprinted by the Runaway Spoon Press, 1997.
- Preliminary Rough Draft of a Total Psychology (theoretical psychology), privately published, 1967.
- A Strayngebook (children's book), Score Publications, 1987.
- An April Poem (visual poetry), Runaway Spoon Press, 1989.
- Spring Poem No. 3,719,242 (visual poetry), Runaway Spoon Press, 1990.
- Of Manywhere-at-Once, vol. 1 (memoir/criticism), Runaway Spoon Press, 1990; 2nd edition, 1991; 3rd edition, 1998.
- Mathemaku 1–5 (mathematical poetry), Tel-Let, 1992.
- Barbaric Bart Meets Batperson and Her Indian Companion Taco (play), Stage Whisper, 1992.
- Barbaric Bart Visits God (play), Abscond Press, 1993.
- Rabbit Stew (play), Hairy Labs Publishing Company, 1994.
- Mathemaku 6–12 (mathematical poetry), Tel-Let, 1994.
- Of Poem (textual poetry), dbqp press, 1995.
- Editor (with Crag Hill) Vispo auf Deutsch, Score Publications/Runaway Spoon Press, 1995.
- Mathemaku 13–19 (mathematical poetry), Tel-Let, 1996.
- min. kolt., matemakuk, Budapest: Kalligram, 2000.
- Xerolage 30, La Farge, Wisconsin: Xexoxial Editions, 2001.
- Editor (with Crag Hill) Writing to Be Seen, vol. 1, Light & Dust, 2001.
- Writing to be seen: an anthology of later 20th century visio-textual art, Runaway Spoon Press and Score Publications, 2001.
- Doing Long Division in Color, Port Charlotte, Florida: Runaway Spoon Press, 2001.
- Mathemaku 20–24, Tel-let, 2003.
- Cryptographiku 1–5, Tel-let, 2003.
- Excerpts from Poem's Search for Meaning, Sticks Press, 2004.
- Bob Grumman's Greatest Hits 1966–2005, Pudding House, 2004.
- Shakespeare & the Rigidniks : A Study of Cerebral Dysfunction, Runaway Spoon Press, 2006.
- From Haiku to Lyriku, Runaway Spoon Press, 2007.
- April to the Power of the Quantity Pythagoras Times Now: A Selection of Mathemaku, Otoliths, 2008.
- Poem, Demerging, Phrygian Press, 2010.
- This is visual poetry, chapbookpublisher, 2010.
- A Preliminary Taxonomy of Poetry, Runaway Spoon Press, 2011.

=== Anthologies ===
- Visuelle Poesie aus den USA, Germany: 1995.
- a haiku celebration of fall, Napanee, Ontario: Haiku Canada, 1996.
- WORD SCORE UTTERANCE CHOREOGRAPHY, London: Writers Forum, 1998.
- Loose Watch, London: Invisible Books, 1998.
- The Secret Life of Words, San Diego: Teaching Resource Center, 2000.
- Another South, Tuscaloosa AL: The University of Alabama Press, 2002.
- Visio-Textual Selectricity, The Runaway Spoon Press, 2008.
- October is Dada Month, Nietzsche's Brolly, 2008.
- Anthology Spidertangle, Xexoxial Editions, 2009.
- Rhythm of Structure: Mathematics Art and Poetic Reflection, Selby Gallery, Ringling College of Art and Design, 2011.
- The Last Vispo Anthology: visual poetry 1998–2008, Fantagraphics, 2012.
