= Resounding Earth =

Chamber music composition by Augusta Read Thomas

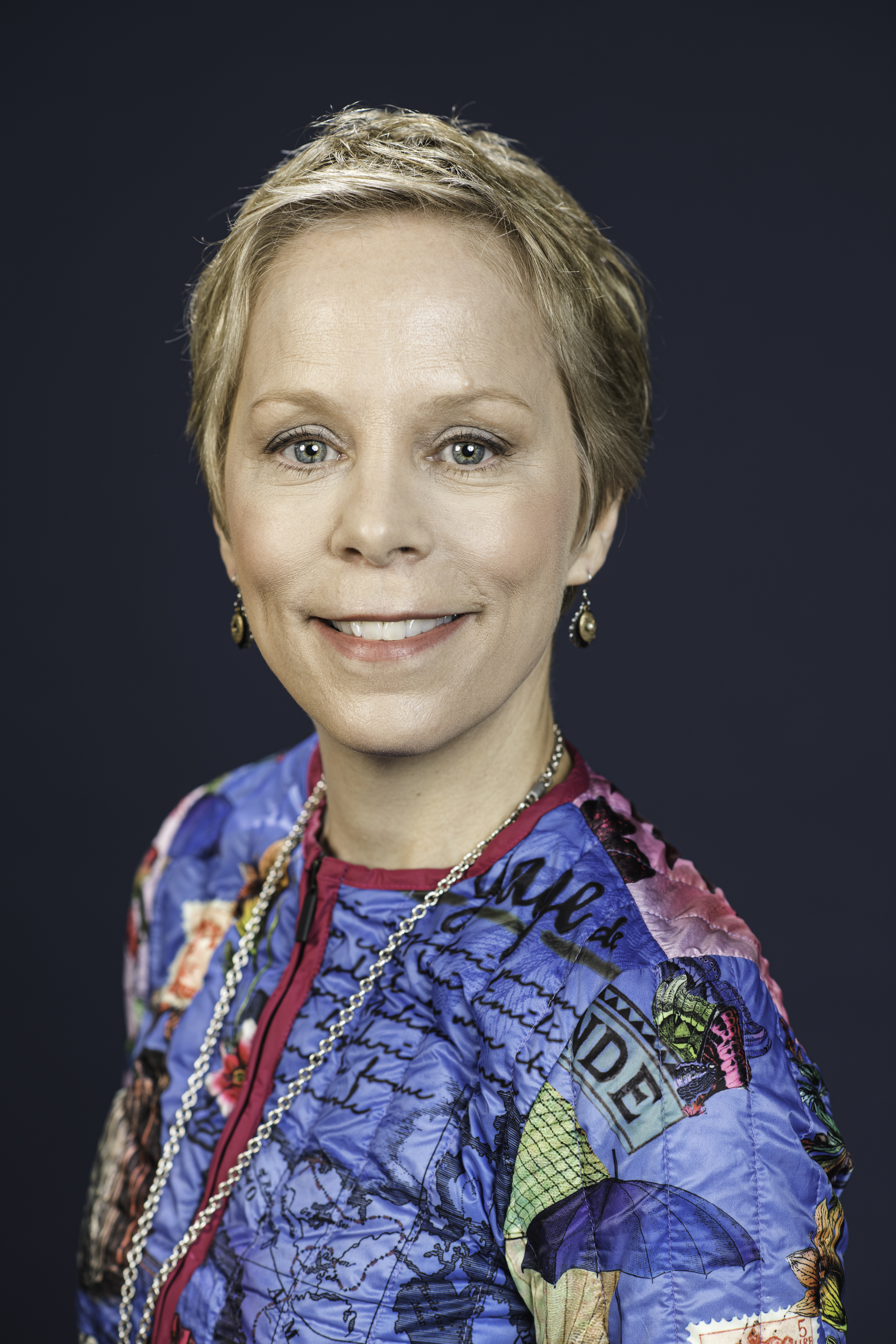
Augusta Read Thomas in 2020

Resounding Earth is a chamber music composition for percussion ensemble by the American composer Augusta Read Thomas. The work was composed in 2012 for the percussion group Third Coast Percussion, to which the piece is dedicated. It was first performed on September 30, 2012, at the University of Notre Dame's DeBartolo Performing Arts Center in Notre Dame, IN.

== Composition ==
Resounding Earth is scored for four percussionists and requires over three hundred metal instruments to perform. Thomas described the inspiration for the piece in the score program notes, writing, "Scored for four percussionists playing bells from a wide variety of cultures and historical periods, the project is conceived as a cultural statement celebrating interdependence and commonality across all cultures; and as a musical statement celebrating the extraordinary beauty and diversity of expression inherent in bell sounds."

=== Structure ===
The piece has a duration of roughly 30 minutes and is composed in four movements:

1. "Invocation – Pulse Radiance" (homage to Olivier Messiaen and Igor Stravinsky)
2. "Prayer – Star Dust Orbits" (homage to Luciano Berio and Pierre Boulez)
3. "Mantra – Ceremonial Time Shapes" (homage to Lou Harrison and György Ligeti)
4. "Reverie – Crystal Lattice" (homage to Edgard Varèse, Harry Partch, and John Cage)

== Reception ==
Resounding Earth has been praised by music critics. Corinna da Fonseca-Wollheim of The New York Times wrote, "...there’s nothing quite like the hypnotic experience of being immersed live in the shimmering, thrumming, pealing sound cloud created by these instruments, many of which have ceremonial powers in their cultures of origin." She added, "Fluidity is a quality in much of Ms. Thomas's work, even as it retains the uncompromising angularity of modernism. Much of that has to do with her unerring ear for tone color and the ever-changing timbres she creates, which pull the listener along as surely as a traditional harmonic progression." John von Rhein of the Chicago Tribune similarly lauded, "There's a ritualistic quality to Thomas' tintinnabulations, each percussionist assuming by turns a kind of hieratic function. Bell sounds at once ancient and modern – bright, dark, shimmering, shattering, rhythmic, lyric – combine to create a wondrous, otherworldly carillon. I found the delicate cosmic song of the Japanese rin in the 'Prayer' section absolutely haunting." Michael Cameron of the Chicago Classical Review remarked:

The clear, semi-dry acoustics of Logan Center were a perfect fit for the strike-and-decay sonic profile, and the players threw themselves into their realization with obvious affection for both the composer and the centuries of musical traditions that shaped each instrument. While the work reflects Thomas' reverence for these cultural symbols, she shows no reticence in coaxing novel timbres from the vast array. A lesser composer might have drowned under the stress of such a profusion of sonic possibilities, but Thomas neatly matched each rhythmic gesture to an appropriate sound and dynamic.
