= Hinnant =

Hinnant is a surname. Notable people with the surname include:

- Bill Hinnant (1935–1978), American actor
- Mike Hinnant (born 1966), American football player
- Skip Hinnant (born 1940), American actor, comedian, and singer
- Vandorn Hinnant (born 1953), American visual artist, poet, and educator
