= Rodrigo Cadiz =

Rodrigo F. Cádiz (born 1972) is a composer and engineer from the Pontificia Universidad Católica de Chile, where he studied with Alejandro Guarello, Aliosha Solovera and Pablo Aranda. He obtained his Ph.D. in Music Technology from Northwestern University in 2006, where he studied with Augusta Read Thomas, Jay Alan Yim, Virgil Moorefield, Amnon Wolman and Gary Kendall.

His music includes works for all genres, and it has been programmed in Chile, the USA, and Europe in venues such as Festival de Música Chilena Contemporánea, June in Buffalo, ICMC, Bourges, SEAMUS, and Música Viva.

His research articles have been published in journals such as the Computer Music Journal and several international conferences. He has taught several courses in computer music. His research interests include digital audio processing, computer music, composition, music perception and cognition, and the musical applications of fuzzy logic.

Cádiz is currently an associate researcher at the Music Institute of the Pontificia Universidad Catolica de Chile and a postdoctoral researcher at the Center for Magnetic Resonance Imaging, School of Engineering at the Pontificia Universidad Catolica de Chile. He is a member of AMC, SEAMUS, and ICMA, and he is the current general coordinator of the Electroacoustic Community of Chile (CECH).

== Awards ==
Cádiz has won several grants and prizes for artistic creation and research, among them Beca Presidente de la República del Gobierno de Chile, Fondo de la Música Nacional, Fundación Andes and Studio22, CIRA, Wonderlic y Wyatt from Northwestern University. He has won several composition prizes in Chile and the US.

== Publications ==
- Cadiz, Rodrigo and Kendall, Gary (2005): A Particle-based Fuzzy Logic Approach to Sound Synthesis Proceedings of the Conference on Interdisciplinary Musicology (CIMO5), Montreal
- Cadiz, Rodrigo (2006): 'A Fuzzy-Logic Mapper for Audiovisual Media' in Computer Music Journal Volume 30, Issue 1 (March 2006) pp 67 – 82 ISSN 0148-9267
- Cadiz, Rodrigo (2009): Computer Music Control by Fuzzy Logic: Theory and Applications VDM Verlag ISBN 978-3-639-14112-2
