= Jay Alan Yim =

American classical composer

- Born: April 24, 1958 (age 68); St. Louis, Missouri, United States
- Education: University of California, Santa Barbara (B.A. 1980); University of London/Royal College of Music (M.Mus. 1981); Harvard University (Ph.D. 1989)
- Occupation: Music composer
- Employer: Northwestern University
- Spouse: Marlena Novak
- Website: shinkyoku.org

Jay Alan Yim (born April 24, 1958) is an American composer of Chinese descent and recipient of a 1994 Guggenheim Fellowship.

== Early life and education ==
Yim was born into a Chinese family in St. Louis, Missouri on April 24, 1958. He attended the University of California, Santa Barbara College of Creative Studies and graduated with a B.A. in 1980. He also received a M.Mus. in 1981 from the University of London and the Royal College of Music, with a Ph.D. from Harvard University earned in 1989.

== Career ==
His works have been performed by the Chicago Symphony Orchestra, the National Symphony Orchestra, Radio Filharmonisch Orkest, Residentie Orchestra, Los Angeles Philharmonic, Sendai Philharmonic, Tanglewood Music Center Orchestra, London Sinfonietta, Arditti String Quartet, New Music Consort, Het Trio, and Nieuw Ensemble.

He currently serves as a professor of music at Northwestern University. Former students include composers Marcos Balter, Kirsten Broberg, Rodrigo Cadiz, Aaron Cassidy, and Mark Engebretson.

== Awards and honors ==
Yim is a 1994 recipient of a Guggenheim Fellowship for music composition in the creative arts category. He also placed third for the 1994 Kennedy Center Friedheim Award, tied with John Anthony Lennon.

== Personal life ==
Yim is married to artist Marlena Novak.
