= Kirsten Broberg =

American musician and composer

Kirsten Soriano (née Broberg; born April 19, 1979) is an American composer from White Bear Lake, Minnesota. Her music has been performed by the Kronos Quartet string quartet, the Chicago Symphony Orchestra MusicNOW Ensemble, the Minnesota Orchestra, the Saint Paul Chamber Orchestra, The Crossing choral ensemble, the International Contemporary Ensemble, Ensemble Dal Niente and the Jack Quartet string quartet. In 2013, she was appointed assistant professor at the University of North Texas and was promoted to associate professor with tenure in 2020. She has served as director of undergraduate studies in the college of music at the University of North Texas since 2018.

== Education ==
Soriano earned a doctorate in music composition in 2009 from Northwestern University in Chicago as a student of Augusta Read Thomas, Jay Alan Yim and Jason Eckardt. At Northwestern she also worked with Kaija Saariaho, Tristan Murail, Oliver Knussen and John Adams. Soriano was the recipient of a Fromm Commissioning Grant from Harvard University in 2009. Her dissertation An Analysis and Contextualization for Resonant Strands, a Cycle of Five Extractable Works for Piano, Bowed Piano and String Quartet analyzes Resonant Strands and provides a historical context for her work by discussing cycles including Carceri d'Invenzione by Brian Ferneyhough, Les Espaces Acoustiques by Gérard Grisey and Opening of the Mouth by Richard Barrett. In 2013 she studied in Paris and southern France with Kaija Saariaho, Tristan Murail, and Philippe Hurel. In recent years she studied with nine-time Emmy-Award winning composer Bruce Broughton.

== Style and work ==
Soriano's music focuses on timbre, and blends spectral, neoromantic, minimalist and complexity trends. Soriano has composed numerous cycles of extractable works including Resonant Strands for piano, bowed piano and string quartet; Natura for mixed winds, strings and percussion; the Waters of Time for soprano, flute, clarinet, piano, percussion, violin and cello; In Search of Imagery for Sinfonietta; and Canticles from the Ends of the Earth for choir and orchestra.

Soriano is the founder of the contemporary music organization Ensemble Dal Niente in Chicago. While Soriano was the Executive Director of Ensemble Dal Niente the ensemble received a Kranichsteiner Stipendium Preise, during the 45th Summer Course for New Music in Darmstadt, Germany.

Her music has been released by multiple labels including Navona Records and Innova Records. She was the featured composer for the New Music Box "Spotlight Session" composer for the American Music Center in May 2009. Soriano won the 2016 Composer's Choice Award in Symphony Number One's third Call for Scores.
