= Raphaël Cendo =

French composer

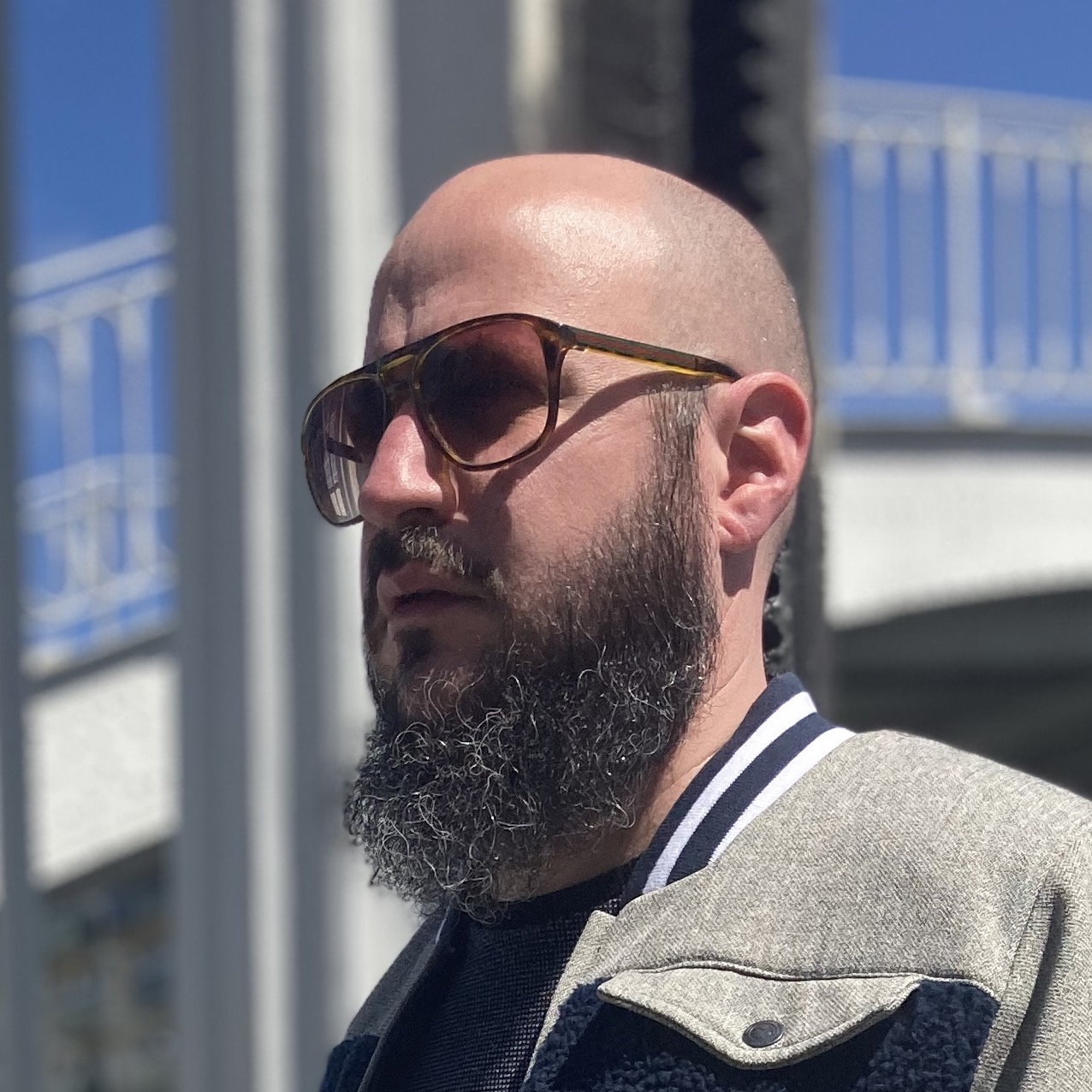
Raphaël Cendo

Raphaël Cendo (born 26 February 1975) is a French composer of contemporary classical music.

== Life ==
Born in Nice, after studying piano and composition at the École Normale de Musique de Paris, Cendo followed the composition curriculum of the Conservatoire de Paris (2000–2003), from which he graduated in composition, analysis and orchestration. He then entered the composition and computer music class of the IRCAM. (2003–2006). During his training, he will have received the lessons of Allain Gaussin, Marco Stroppa, Brian Ferneyhough, Fausto Romitelli and Philippe Manoury.

He has taught at the Conservatoire de Nanterre, the Escola Superior de Música de Catalunya of Barcelona (Catalonia College of Music), at the Darmstadt Summer School (2012–2014), at the "New Voices" composition sessions in Royaumont Abbey (2012–2016) and is regularly invited to give master classes and conferences in the United States, Russia and Europe. He is the director of the University of Altitude, a summer academy of composition that takes place every year in Saint-Martin-Vésubie.

From 2009 to 2011, he was a resident at the Villa Medici of the French Academy in Rome. In 2007, Cendo received the Prix Espoir, awarded by the Francis and Mica Salabert Foundation, from the Montreal Symphony Orchestra's International Composition Competition. In 2009, he received the Pierre Cardin Prize from the Académie des Beaux-Arts and in 2011 and 2015 the Hervé Dugardin and Georges Enesco Prize from SACEM. Cendo currently lives and works in Berlin.

== Work ==
Influenced by spectral music, current and popular music, composers such as Brian Ferneyhough and Fausto Romitelli, Cendo (like Franck Bedrossian) promotes the concept of 'saturation' or 'saturated music'. Concept of excess, the important thing is to go beyond pure sound, absolute control of the note, interpretation by new complex sounds: "The saturated phenomenon in the field of acoustics is an excess of matter, energy, movement and timbre." His music thus pushes to the limits the notions of timbre, frequency space, intensity and instrumental gestures.

His works are performed by internationally renowned musicians and ensembles such as the Klangforum Wien, the Tana Quartet, Linea, Dal Niente, Alternance, Cairn, Ictus, Intercontemporain, Itinéraire, musikFabrik, the Nouvel Ensemble Moderne, Either/Or, Yarn/Wire, the Diotima Quartet, the Orchestre national d'Île-de-France, the Montreal Symphony Orchestra, the Bavarian Radio Symphony Orchestra, the Munich Radio Orchestra, Les Percussions de Strasbourg, etc.

He has participated in many events including Ars Musica in Brussels, Venice Biennale, Darmstädter Ferienkurse, Donaueschingen Festival, MITO SettembreMusica in Milan, Musica in Strasbourg, Festival Présences of Radio France, the Tremplin Concerts of the Centre Pompidou, Voix Nouvelles in Royaumont, Why Note in Dijon, Archipel, composer portraits series at the Miller Theatre, New York City.

== Awards ==
- 2007: Prix Espoir, awarded by the Fondation Francis and Mica Salabert
- 2009: Prix Pierre Cardin of the Académie des Beaux-Arts
- 2011: Prix Hervé Dugardin of the SACEM

== Works ==
His works – unless otherwise stated – are published by Maison ONA.

- Scratch data (2002) for percussion and electronics
- Rage in the heaven city (2004) for large orchestra
- Masse-Métal (2005) for twenty-five musicians
- Action painting (2005) for fifteen musicians, Verlag Neue Musik
- Décombres (2006) for contrabass clarinet and electronics
- Action Directe (2007) for bass clarinet and thirteen musicians ensemble
- Tract (2007) for seven musicians
- Octa 7 (2007) for harp and electronics, on a choreography by Olivia Grandville
- Refontes (2008) for six percussion and electronics, Gérard Billaudot Éditeur
- Charge (2009) for seven instruments and electronics on a video by Paolo Pacchini, Gérard Billaudot Éditeur
- Introduction aux ténèbres (2009), for double bass, bass voice and electronics, Gérard Billaudot Éditeur
- Furia (2009/2010) for cello and piano, Verlag Neue Musik
- Faction pour piano (2011), percussion and electric guitar
- Shadow (2011) for six singers
- In Vivo (2011) for string Quartet (No 1), Gérard Billaudot Éditeur
- Rokh (2011–2012) for flute, violin, cello and piano, Verlag Neue Musik
- Foris (2012) for cello and electronics, Verlag Neue Musik
- Carbone (2012) for double bass flute, trumpet, guitar and ensemble
- Substance (2013) for string quartet (No 2), Verlag Neue Musik
- Registre des Lumières (2013) for vocal ensemble, instrumental and electronic ensemble live, Verlag Neue Musik
- Graphein (2014) for nine musicians, Verlag Neue Musik
- Badlands (2014) for percussion
- Corps (2015) Concerto for piano, Verlag Neue Musik
- Radium (2016) for seven musicians
- Denkklange (2016) for symphony orchestra
- Delocazione (2017) Quartet (No 3) for string quartet and vocal quartet
- Oracles (2018) Opera
- Le jour juste avant l'océan (2018) for vocal, instrumental and jazz ensemble
- Individua (2018) for organ and augmented choir
- Ars satura (2019) for flute, saxophone, percussion and piano

== Discography ==
- Raphaël Cendo, Introduction Aux Ténèbres, ensemble Ictus, in "Donaueschinger Musiktage 2009", 1 CD Neos, 2010.
- Raphaël Cendo, Furia, includes: Charge; Furia; Décombres; In Vivo and Tract, Ensemble Cairn, direction: Guillaume Bourgogne, 1 CD Aeon Records, 2012.
- Raphaël Cendo, Rokh, ensemble Alternance, 1 CD Stradivarius, 2012.

== Bibliography ==
- Gallet, Bastien (2008). "Dérives : entretien avec Franck Bedrossian et Raphaël Cendo". L'Étincelle (in French). No. 4. pp. 22–24.
- Vilarem, Laurent (12 November 2009). "Fureur et mystère de Raphaël Cendo". Altamusica.com (interview) (in French).
