= Helen Adam =

American poet (1909–1993)

- Born: 2 December 1909; Glasgow, Scotland
- Died: 19 September 1993 (aged 83); New York City, U.S.
- Education: University of Edinburgh
- Known for: Scottish poet, collagist and photographer Active participant in the San Francisco Renaissance
- Notable work: The Elfin Pedlar and Tales Told by the Pixie Pool, 1923; Charms and Dreams from the Elfin Pedlar's Pack, 1924; Shadow of the Moon, 1929; The Queen O' Crow Castle, 1958; Ballads, 1964; Counting Out Rhyme, 1972; Selected Poems and Ballads, 1974; Ghosts and Grinning Shadows (a collection of short stories), 1977; Turn Again to Me and Other Poems, 1977; Gone Sailing, 1980; Songs with Music, 1982; The Bells of Dis, 1984 (With Auste Adam) Stone Cold Gothic, 1984 "San Francisco's Burning", 1985; A Helen Adam Reader. Edited with notes and an introduction by Kristin Prevallet, 2008
- Awards: 1981 American Book Award

Helen Adam (December 2, 1909 in Glasgow, Scotland – September 19, 1993 in New York City) was a Scottish poet, collagist and photographer who was part of a literary movement contemporaneous to the Beat Generation that occurred in San Francisco during the 1950s and 1960s. Though often associated with the Beat poets, she would more accurately be considered one of the predecessors of the Beat Generation.

== Life ==
Adam's first book of poetry, The Elfin Pedlar and Tales Told by the Pixie Pool, was published in 1923, when she was 14 years old. The collection was in the Victorian genre of light verse about fairies and other pastoral subjects. Her early books were well known and reviewed; the composer Sir Charles Villiers Stanford set selections from The Elfin Pedlar to orchestral music, and performed them widely.

Adam attended the University of Edinburgh for two years as a non-matriculated student, after which she worked as a journalist in London. In 1939 she moved to the United States and eventually moved to San Francisco. In San Francisco she worked with such influential poets as Allen Ginsberg and Robert Duncan. Adam also developed her first theater piece, 'San Francisco's Burning', a play with music, as well as unique visual designs & curtain by the San Francisco artist Gary Swartzburg, who worked with her on various theater projects prior to her moving to New York. One of the oldest of the poets in the San Francisco Renaissance, she worked closely with Duncan, Jess, Madeline Gleason, and Jack Spicer, among others. She also encouraged many of the Beat poets as they began to explore performance and writing as an art form. While her continued use of the ballad form "mystified" many of the poets more associated with the movement, the "magic and knowledge she brought to San Francisco startled the young wild sages of its Renaissance with a special kind of madness." Robert Duncan once referred to Adam as "the extraordinary nurse of enchantment."

Helen Adam and her sister Pat collaborated on a ballad opera entitled San Francisco's Burning which was published in 1963 and reissued in 1985 with score by Al Carmines and drawings by Jess. Writer and friend Samuel R. Delany describes how the sisters took on the task of writing lyrics for different songs. A collection of her poems was collected in a work titled Selected Poems and Ballads. She was one of only four women whose work was included in Donald Allen's landmark anthology, The New American Poetry 1945-1960 (1960). Adam also appeared in several films: "Flotsum", a 45-minute art film done in San Francisco by her friend, the artist Gary Swartzburg, Poetry in Motion by Ron Mann, Death and Our Corpses Speak by German experimental film maker Rosa von Praunheim.

Her papers are held at University at Buffalo, The State University of New York, and Kent State University.

Following the death of her sister in the 1980s, Adam disappeared from public view, dying in Brooklyn, New York, in September 1993.

== Awards ==
- 1981 American Book Award

== Poem ==
An example of Helen Adam's verse with its striking use of language is "Margaretta's Rime":

Margaretta's Rime

In Amsterdam, that old city,
Church bells tremble and cry;
All day long their airy chiming
Clavers across the sky.
I am young in the old city,
My heart dead in my breast.
I hear the bells in the sky crying,
"Every being is blest."
In Amsterdam, that old city,
Alone at a window I stand,
A spangled garter my only clothing,
A candle flame in my hand.
The people who pass that lighted window,
Looking me up and down,
Know I am one more tourist trifle
For sale in this famous town.
Noon til dusk at the window waiting,
Nights of fury and shame.
I am young in an old city
Playing an older game.
I hear the bells in the sky crying
To the dead heart in my breast,
The gentle bells in the sky crying
"Every being is blest."

== Collages ==
Adam made a series of collages in the 1950s, influenced by San Francisco artist Jess. Of the work, Kristin Prevallet said that "the true desires of women are fulfilled not by mortal men, but by highly charged encounters with unhuman beings."

== Selected publications ==
- The Elfin Pedlar and Tales Told by the Pixie Pool, New York, London, G.P. Putnam's Sons, 1924. OCLC 1499053
- Charms and Dreams from the Elfin Pedlar's Pack, 1924
- Shadow of the Moon, 1929
- The Queen O' Crow Castle, 1958
- Ballads, 1964
- Counting Out Rhyme, 1972
- Selected Poems and Ballads, 1974
- Ghosts and Grinning Shadows (a collection of short stories), Hanging Loose Press, 1977 ISBN 9780914610106
- Turn Again to Me and Other Poems, Kulchur Foundation, 1977. OCLC 3240919
- Gone Sailing, West Branch, Iowa: Toothpaste Press, 1980. ISBN 9780915124305, OCLC 6016319
- Songs with Music, 1982
- The Bells of Dis, Coffee House Press, 1985. ISBN 9780915124923, OCLC 633348555
- (With Auste Adam) Stone Cold Gothic, N.Y., N.Y. : Kulchur Foundation, 1984. ISBN 9780936538082, OCLC 11068931
- "San Francisco's Burning", 1985; Brooklyn Hanging Loose Press, 1999. ISBN 9780914610434, OCLC 330471884
- A Helen Adam Reader. Edited with notes and an introduction by Kristin Prevallet, Orono : National Poetry Foundation, 2007. ISBN 9780943373744, OCLC 494131823
