= Mark Engebretson =

American classical composer

Mark Engebretson, DMA, Northwestern University (born 1964, California) is a saxophonist and composer. His music combines computer music and live performance, the latter usually performed on saxophone.

== Biography ==
Engebretson was born in California and raised in Alexandria, Minnesota. His family later moved to North St. Paul, Minnesota. His father, a retired doctor, is also a saxophonist as well as a clarinettist. Engbretson attended St. Olaf College for a year before transferring to the University of Minnesota. He is currently Professor of Composition and Electronic Music at the University of North Carolina at Greensboro and director of the Alice Virginia Poe Williams Electronic Music Studio at that university. He is a member of Red Clay Saxophone Quartet and was formerly a member of the Vienna Saxophone Quartet. Aside from Northwestern University, he also studied at the University of Minnesota and the Conservatoire de Bordeaux. His teachers have included Frederick Hemke, Jean-Marie Londeix, M. William Karlins, Pauline Oliveros, Marta Ptaszynska, Michael Pisaro and Jay Alan Yim.

== Music ==
As a composer his influences include Steve Reich, John Cage and György Ligeti. Eric Stokes introduced him to experimental music and found sound (i.e. Found art using sounds as its material). Engebretson has received commissions from Harvard University's Fromm Music Foundation (2007) and the Thomas S. Kenan Center for the Arts (2008). His compositions have been performed at Indiana State University New Music Festival (Terre Haute, Indiana) and International Society for Contemporary Music Festivals (Tirana, Albania and Baku, Azerbaijan) as well as contemporary music festivals such as Wien Modern (Vienna), Gaida Festival (Vilnius, Lithuania), Ny Musikk (Bergen, Norway) and the Florida Electroacoustic Music Festival. The world premiere of SaxMax was given at the 14th World Saxophone Congress in Ljubljana, Slovenia by James Romain.
