= Astral Canticle =

Concerto by Augusta Read Thomas

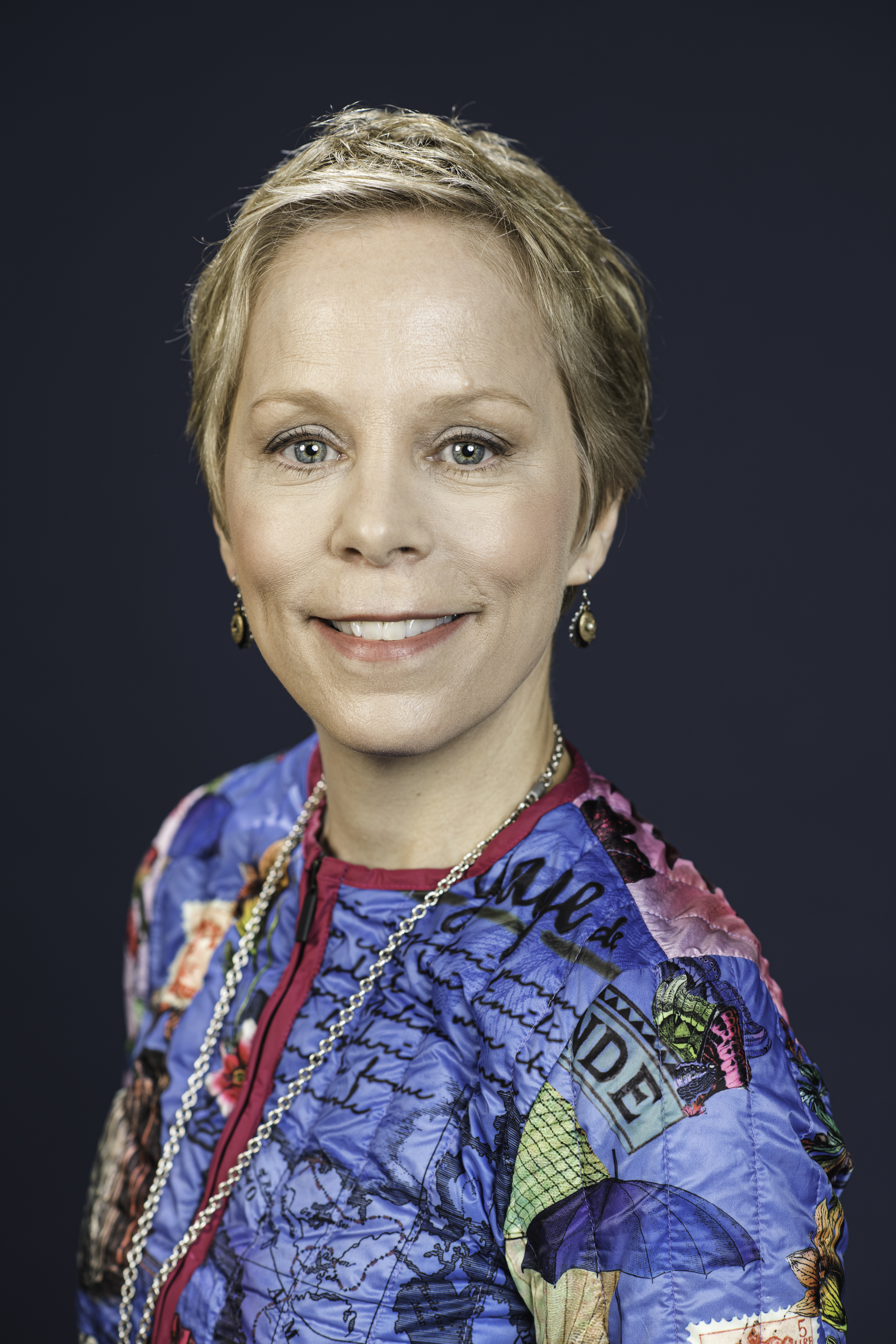
Augusta Read Thomas in 2020

Astral Canticle is a double concerto for violin, flute, and orchestra by the American composer Augusta Read Thomas. The work was Thomas's sixth and final commission by the Chicago Symphony Orchestra before she concluded her nine-year tenure there as composer-in-residence. It was first performed in Chicago on June 1, 2006, by the flutist Mathieu Dufour, the violinist Robert Chen, and the Chicago Symphony Orchestra under the conductor Daniel Barenboim. The piece is dedicated to Barenboim and the Chicago Symphony Orchestra. The composition was a finalist for the 2007 Pulitzer Prize for Music.

== Composition ==
Astral Canticle has a duration of roughly 20 minutes and is composed in one continuous movement. Thomas described elements of the work in the score program notes, writing, "The title is derived from Astral — connected with the stars; and Canticle — denoting a song or chant." She continued:

A graceful chant-like canticle, played extremely quietly by the two soloists with very little vibrato, opens the composition. Certain "hidden" members of the orchestra (hidden but on stage) hold the resonance of this calm chant, thereby slowly implying warm harmonies. The canticle weaves its way through the entire composition in one variation or another. The first variation is led by the orchestra, which, after about 90 seconds, responds to the delicate opening in a majestic, fanfare-like manner. The virtuosic soloists play back to the orchestra what they just heard, which results in a very demanding passage for the violin soloist. The two worlds (chant-like and radiant-fanfare) that have been established evolve, interconnect, and influence each other. As the entire work is derived from the opening materials, a very integrated sound palette exists, yet at the same time, there are many different characters of music, and spirits, that unfold such that the 20-minute work contains several sections that are of varying personality. For instance, the middle of the work is akin to a slow movement and the end of the work is akin to a rhythmic and driving finale, but simple movement demarcations are not easily applicable as the music's flow is fluid and interconnected from section to section. In the final 1/3 of the piece, there is a rhythmic, punchy dance-like passage in 10/8 meter (3+2+2+3) which transforms into a driving, metrical, and playful passage which is led by double bass pizzicati; all of this is reminiscent of Igor Stravinsky crossed with Charles Mingus.

=== Instrumentation ===
The work is scored for solo violin, solo flute, and an orchestra comprising piccolo, two additional flutes, three oboes, three clarinets, two bassoons (doubling contrabassoon), four horns, three trumpets, three trombones, tuba, three percussionists, harp, and strings.

== Reception ==
Reviewing the world premiere, John von Rhein of the Chicago Tribune called the strength of the piece "undeniable in this first performance." He wrote:

Astral Canticle is one of Thomas' more immediately accessible pieces, and there is something interesting taking place at any given moment. In the more extrovert sections, the bright clangor of metallic percussion encircles the orchestra as would the sun's corona. Each soloist has characteristically fluid material to play. The supercharged finale ("Igor Stravinsky crossed with Charles Mingus," Thomas calls it) brings eruptive walls of sound as only the Chicago brass can produce.

Rhein added, "There's no doubt Astral Canticle will make its way through the orchestral world."
