= Tara Betts =

American poet

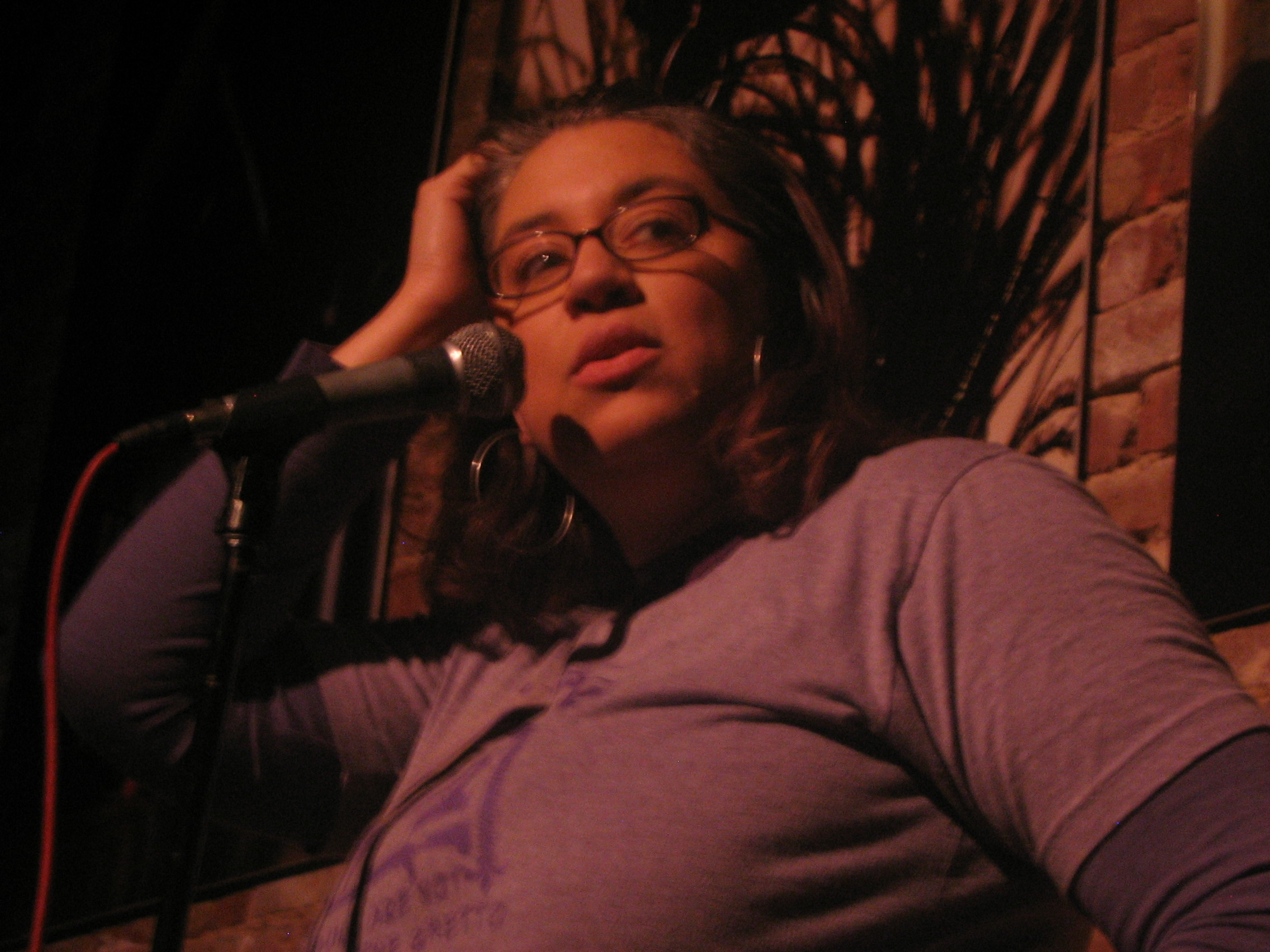
- Born: Kankakee, Illinois, U.S.
- Education: Loyola University, Chicago; New England College; Binghamton University
- Occupations: Poet, editor, teacher
- Writing career
- Notable works: Arc & Hue
- Notable awards: 1999 Gwendolyn Brooks Open Mic Poetry Awards

Tara Betts is an American poet. She is the author of three poetry collections: Refuse to Disappear, which was published in June 2022 with The Word Works, Break the Habit, which was published in October 2016 with Trio House Press, and her debut collection Arc & Hue on the Willow Books imprint of Aquarius Press. In 2010, Essence Magazine named her as one of their "40 Favorite Poets".

Betts was born in Kankakee, Illinois, and is the oldest of three siblings. Her first job was at the Kankakee Public Library. Betts received her B.A. degree in communication at Loyola University, Chicago. She is also a graduate of the Cave Canem and the MFA Program in Poetry at New England College (graduated 2007).

Betts worked with several non-profit organizations in Chicago, Illinois, including Gallery 37 and Young Chicago Authors. She received her Ph.D. in English/creative writing at Binghamton University in 2014.

== Career ==
After earning her Ph.D., Betts returned to Chicago and began her post as a visiting lecturer at University of Illinois-Chicago in 2015. Prior to that, she was a lecturer in creative writing at Rutgers University in New Brunswick, New Jersey, until 2011. A Cave Canem graduate, and residencies from Ragdale Foundation, Centrum and Caldera, and an Illinois Arts Council Artist fellowship. Betts has self-published small runs of several chapbooks: "Can I Hang?" (1999), "Switch" (2003), "Break the Habit" (2012), and "Circling Unexpectedly" (2013). Her most recent chapbook 7 x 7: kwansabas was published by Backbone Press in 2015. Betts is also a co-editor of The Beiging of America: Personal Narratives About Being Mixed Race in the Twenty-First Century (2 Leaf Press, 2017) with Cathy Schlund-Vials and Sean Patrick Forbes.

She is working on a third collection of poetry, a collection of critical essays, and a translation of poems by Salomé Ureña de Henríquez. Betts was commissioned by the Peggy Choy Dance Company to write a series of poems and monologues for "THE GREATEST!: An Homage to Muhammad Ali" in 2011 and 2013. These writings were published by Winged City Press in April 2013 and were mentioned in The New York Times.

Betts' work has appeared in Essence, the Steppenwolf Theater production Words on Fire, Obsidian III, Callaloo, PMS, Meridians, Drum Voices Revue, WSQ, Columbia Poetry Review, African Voices, Ninth Letter, Hanging Loose, Drunken Boat, Mythium, Reverie, and WombPoetry. Her work has been anthologized in Gathering Ground (University of Michigan Press), Bum Rush the Page (Three Rivers Press), Power Lines (Tia Chucha Press), Poetry Slam (Manic D Press), Black Writing from Chicago (Southern Illinois University Press), ROLE CALL (Third World Press), These Hands I Know (Sarabande), Best Black Women’s Erotica 2 (Cleis Press), Hurricane Blues (Southeast Missouri University Press), Home Girls Make Some Noise: Hip Hop Feminism (Parker Publishing), Fingernails Across a Chalkboard (Third World Press), Quotes Community: Notes for Black Poets (University of Michigan Press) and Letters to the World (Red Hen Press).

She appeared on HBO's Def Poetry Jam and in the Black Family Channel series SPOKEN with Jessica Care Moore. She has also been one of the writers/performers in girlstory-an intergenerational, multicultural women's performance collective. Betts has also performed in plays, including two SouthWest V-Day productions of Eve Ensler's Vagina Monologues at Chicago's DuSable Museum. After winning Guild Complex's Gwendolyn Brooks Open Mic Award, she represented Chicago twice at the National Poetry Slam in 1999 and 2000. Betts has also taught writing workshops at Cook County Jail and Cook County Juvenile Detention Center.

Betts has also been a freelance writer for publications including XXL, The Source, BIBR, Mosaic Magazine and Black Radio Exclusive. She has written fictional blog posts in the voice of character named Madeline "Maddy" James for "Any Resemblance"–a multimedia dance show with serial webisodes in June 2013.

== Published works ==
Full-length poetry collections

- Refuse to Disappear (The Word Works, 2022).
- Break the Habit (Trio House Press, 2016).
- Arc and Hue (Willow Books, 2009).

In anthology

- "Nothing From Nobody," That Takes Ovaries!: Bold Females and Their Brazen Acts (Three Rivers Press, 2002).
- Rhythm of Structure: Mathematics Art and Poetic Reflection, Selby Gallery, Ringling College of Art and Design, 2011.
- Near Kin: A Collection of Words and Art Inspired by Octavia Estelle Butler (Sybaritic Press, 2014).
- Octavia's Brood: Science Fiction Stories from Social Justice Movements (AK Press, 2015).
- The BreakBeat Poets: New American Poetry in the Age of Hip-Hop (Haymarket Books, 2015).
- Ghost Fishing: An Eco-Justice Poetry Anthology (University of Georgia Press, 2018).
