= Marlena Novak =

American artist

Marlena Novak is an American artist based in Chicago and Amsterdam.

== Biography ==
Born in Pennsylvania, she earned degrees from Carnegie-Mellon University (BFA, 1979) and Northwestern University (MFA, 1983).

The first phase of her exhibition career spanned the early 1980s through 2004 and focused largely on paintings using encaustic as the primary medium, and exploring color theory, geometrical proportion, and texture. These works have been presented internationally in a wide range of exhibition venues, including the School of the Art Institute of Chicago, Art Cologne, Art Chicago International Expo, Galerie Waszkowiak (Berlin), Roy Boyd Gallery (Chicago), and the Hungarian Academy of Sciences (Budapest).

Following grants from the Center for Interdisciplinary Research in the Arts at Northwestern University (1998) and the Arts Council of Great Britain (2000), her artmaking began to increasingly employ time-based media (digital animation and video). This body of work has dominated her output since that time, taking the form of installations, video, photography, and performance. These works have also been presented at international venues, including the National Art Museum of China (“TransLife”, Beijing, CN), the STRP Art and Technology Festival (Eindhoven, NL), Sony Center-Potsdamer Platz (DAM/Digital Art Museum, Berlin), the Taipei Digital Art Festival (Taipei, TW), and the Mondriaanhuis (Museum for Constructive and Concrete Art, Amersfoort, NL).

The ethical scope of Novak’s concerns has expanded in several recent projects — pr!ck (2006–2008), scale (2010), Bird (2012–14) — to address ethological topics via interactive installations. A significant portion of her work since 1998 has been collaborative, with those collaborators including musicians (Frances-Marie Uitti, Jay Alan Yim), computer scientists (Ian Horswill), neuromechanical engineers (Malcolm MacIver), as well as other new media artists. In 2010, she was invited by the College Art Association to serve on the Task Force on the Use of Human and Animal Subjects in Art; subsequently this organization published a report which includes recommendations for future art projects to consider as ethical guidelines. An interview with Novak published in the journal Antennae also discusses these concerns.

From 1995-1998, she was a contributing editor to Flash Art Magazine. From 1984-87, and again in 1990, she served as a juror for the Chicago International Film Festival in the Documentary Films category.

Parallel to her activities as an exhibiting artist, she is currently a faculty member at the School of the Art Institute of Chicago (Department of Film, Video, New Media, and Animation). She also co-developed the interdisciplinary Animate Arts Program at Northwestern University.
