= Dayton City Paper =

- Type: Alternative newsweekly
- Format: Tabloid
- Owner: Independent
- Founded: 1993
- Ceased publication: September 2018
- Language: English
- Headquarters: PO Box 10065; Dayton, OH 45402; United States
- Circulation: 18,570± weekly
- Website: daytoncitypaper.com

The Dayton City Paper was a free weekly newspaper distributed throughout the metro Dayton, Ohio region from April 3, 2003 through September 11, 2018.

== History ==
The publication launched on August 26, 1993, under the name The Dayton Voice by the husband and wife team of Jeff Epton and Marianne McMullen. In the early 2000s, the paper's name was changed to Impact Weekly as a result of legal pressure levied by the nationally known alternative Newsweekly, The Village Voice which did the same to numerous weekly publications that included the word “Voice” in their names. A handshake agreement amongst many former “Voice” named publications yielded several new, but unrelated “City Paper” publications nationally including Philadelphia, PA, Washington, D.C., Baltimore, MD, and Toledo, OH. On April 3, 2003, Impact Weekly became Dayton City Paper.

An ownership change in January 2009 ushered in an editorial narrowing from its broad “weekly news and culture” format to hyper-local arts, culture, and entertainment coverage. The DCP cherry-picked editorial covering the region's performing and visual arts, cultural diversity, entertainment offerings (occasionally including Cincinnati and Columbus), nightlife, recreation, dining, beer, wine, festivals, and a blend of political debate and opinion. This shift, alongside other changes in 2010, such as moving its street publication day from Wednesdays to Tuesdays, converting its presentation from 50% color/50% black & white to an all-color publication printed on brighter paper stock, and increasing its regional availability footprint by securing at least twenty-five regional Kroger stores along with other key pickup locations such as the Dayton International Airport and the entire University of Dayton campus, the paper increased its readership from under 30,000 weekly readers to over 50,000 by 2017.

Early readership surges quickly helped increase revenue sufficiently for employee-publisher Paul Noah to secure low-interest financing to form a new company, Dayton City Media, that purchased the Dayton City Paper in April 2012. Other growth benefits included a rapid page-count increase from an average of 32 pages per week in 2009 to anywhere from 40 pages to 44 pages starting in 2013. This allowed the publication to expand editorial content and increase critical display advertising (its only revenue source). At one time the paper swelled to 52 pages. The Dayton City Paper’s contributor roster climbed to its peak of over thirty freelance writers, as did its distribution pickup location count from approximately 350 to over 500 locations by 2016.

The Dayton City Paper attempted to remain politically neutral in regards to arts and culture while still covering the myriad of lifestyles throughout the region, especially with respect to local and independent music coverage. In addition to over 80% locally written content, the publication featured a roster of syndicated content, including Amy Alkon's "The Advice Goddess", Chuck Shepard's "News of the Weird," Cariel's "Sign Language Astrology", and the New York Times Sunday Crossword, as well as weekly editorial cartoons including Don Asmussen's "Bad Reporter," Donna Barstow's "Daily Special," and political satire by Ted Rall (raised in Kettering, Ohio). Readers especially enjoyed the DCP's weekly locally-driven "debate forum" created by former Impact Weekly publisher Kerry Farley where opposing writers argued in favor or against political and social issues of the day, with an emphasis on local issues. Common debate topics, like presidents, abortion, guns, and God, were typically avoided. The only topics the paper ever took sides on were legalization of same-sex marriage, marijuana legalization, and solidarity with the French publication Charlie Hebdo.

On April 25, 2015, the official website of the Dayton City Paper was hacked by an unknown individual or individuals claiming to be affiliated with the Islamic State of Iraq and the Levant (ISIS). The DCP's website homepage instead played foreign music, displayed a picture of a masked man holding an apparent assault rifle, and displayed the message "Hacked by Team System DZ. I am Muslim & I love Jihad. I love ISIS <3." The paper's publisher, Paul Noah, stated in an interview on a local TV station he believed the hacking may have been related to the paper's January 20, 2015 edition where the Dayton City Paper executive team collectively chose to publish an approximation via illustrated parody the cover of the January 14 issue of Charlie Hebdo following the Charlie Hebdo shooting.

The Dayton City Paper published its final issue on September 11, 2018, with the next issue not appearing on the next scheduled publication date of September 18. The next day, it was reported by several of the paper's writers that the paper had ceased publication, and the same day the newspaper's official website transitioned to provide only an archive of the virtual edition versions of past issues.

The next week several local news media sources revealed that one the newspaper's employees, Wanda Esken, whom had been promoted the role of associate publisher and later to Dayton City Paper publisher in September 2017, had been indicted on charges of grand theft and forgery in relation to her activities in the company. In early January 2018 Noah contacted police after being told by the company that printed the Dayton City Paper that Dayton City Media owed about $35,000 in unpaid invoices. Shortly afterward, he learned from the Victoria Theatre Association (the DCP's landlord) that the publication was four months behind on rent as well. The resulting investigation by the City of Dayton Police Department over the next several months became the basis behind the Montgomery County Prosecutor's indictment.

The Dayton City Paper was able to remain afloat for over another half year through Noah's own savings, with no public hint the paper was in trouble other than the decrease in page count to an average of thirty-two to thirty-six pages per week by mid-Spring 2018. However, he was ultimately unable to prevent it from shutting down. He stated that prior to the scandal the paper was thriving, with plans to expand into other markets such as Lexington, Kentucky. After confirming the Dayton Metro Library possessed at least one hard copy of every edition since its 1993 Dayton Voice launch, Noah promised to maintain DaytonCityPaper.com as an online archive of all virtual editions since August 4, 2010 as a courtesy to the paper's writers, advertisers, and readers.

Wanda Esken was arrested on February 4, 2019, based on three Fourth Degree Felony-Grand Theft charges and one Fifth Degree Felony-Forgery charge. Her trial, State of Ohio v. Wanda Esken, was scheduled for late July, 2019 in Montgomery County, Ohio Common Pleas Court in Dayton. In February 2021, she pleaded guilty to "one count of grand theft of more than $7,500 but less than $150,000, a fourth-degree felony, and to one count of forgery, a fifth-degree felony", in Montgomery County Common Pleas Court, according to documents filed on the court’s web portal Thursday, February 4. As part of the plea agreement, two additional counts of grand theft were dismissed."
