= Marcos Balter =

Brazilian contemporary classical composer

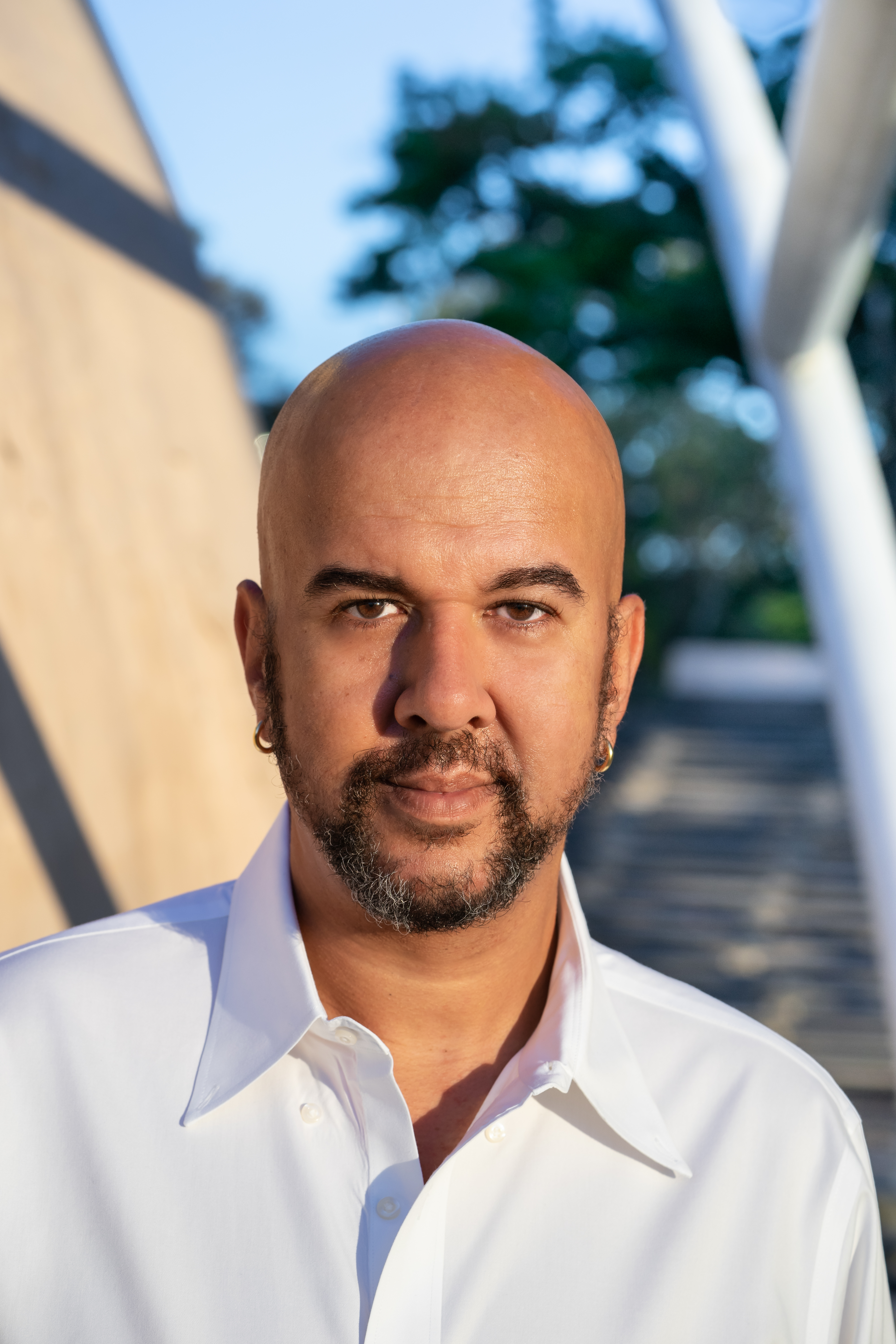
- Image of Marcos Balter

Background information
- Born: Marcos Balter; April 1, 1974 (age 52); Rio de Janeiro, Brazil
- Origin: New York City, New York, U.S.
- Genres: Contemporary classical; chamber; postmodernism; postminimalism; spectralism; surrealism; eclecticism; electroacoustic
- Occupation: Composer
- Instruments: Piano
- Years active: 1979–present
- Website: Marcos Balter

Marcos Balter (born April 1, 1974) is a Brazilian contemporary classical music composer and the Fritz Reiner Professor of Musical Composition at Columbia University.

== Life and professional career ==
Balter began his music studies at age five at the Conservatório Musical Heitor Villa-Lobos, and was admitted to the Conservatório Brasileiro de Música at age eleven. During his late teenage years, Balter studied privately with composer Almeida Prado and pianist Linda Bustani. He moved to the United States in 1995 to study music composition at Texas Christian University and later on at Northwestern University. His main composition teachers were Augusta Read Thomas, Amy Williams, and Jay Alan Yim.

His works have been programmed by prominent music organizations including the New York Philharmonic, Chicago Symphony Orchestra MusicNOW Series, Los Angeles Philharmonic, Internationales Musikinstitut Darmstadt, Philharmonie de Paris, San Francisco Symphony, Ojai Music Festival, New World Center, Lincoln Center's Mostly Mozart Festival, São Paulo Municipal Symphony Orchestra, Iceland Symphony Orchestra, and the Fromm Music Series at Harvard University. Past honors include the American Academy of Arts and Letters Music Award, commissions from Meet the Composer, Chamber Music America, the Fromm Music Foundation, and the Art Institute of Chicago, as well as fellowships from the John Simon Guggenheim Memorial Foundation, Tanglewood Music Center (Leonard Bernstein Fellowship), Lawrence University, the Civitella Ranieri Foundation, and Reid Hall's Institute for Ideas and Imagination.

Balter is the Fritz Reiner Professor of Musical Composition at Columbia University (New York City). Prior to that, he was a professor of music at UC San Diego from 2020 to 2022, an associate professor of Music Theory/Composition at Montclair State University from 2014 to 2020, Director of Music Composition Studies at Columbia College Chicago from 2009 to 2014, Visiting professor of composition at the University of Pittsburgh in 2008–09, Visiting professor at Northwestern University in 2010, and visiting professor at the University of Pennsylvania in 2018.

In 2025, Balter became the Co-Director of the Music Composition program at Boston Symphony's Tanglewood Music Center.

== Musical style ==
Balter's eclectic and unique compositional voice draws from several sources ranging from Spectral Music to Postminimalism, with a special emphasis on unusual sound colors and complex rhythmic patterns. His music often blurs the boundaries between Modernism and Post-Modernism, and is embraced by a wide array of musical trends. His works frequently explore the individualistic qualities of the performers for whom they are written. To that extent, his particularly close relationship with artists like the International Contemporary Ensemble, Ensemble Dal Niente, flautist Claire Chase, and violist Nadia Sirota have decidedly shaped his musical language into what critics describe as "a fiercely imaginative palette of instrumental and vocal sounds rare in today's dour, post-classical new music" (The Chicago Tribune), "surrealistic" (The New York Times), and "a virtuosic equilibrium of colliding particles" (Boston Globe).

His catalogue includes works for solo instruments, electroacoustic music, chamber music, and orchestral works.
