= Edwin Torres (poet) =

Nuyorican performance poet (born 1958)

- Born: 1958 (age 67–68)
- Occupation: Poet
- Writing career
- Notable awards: Foundation for Contemporary Arts Grants to Artists Award, 1995, Fellowships from the Foundation for Contemporary Performance Art, the New York State Foundation for the Arts, and the Lower Manhattan Cultural Council
- Movement: "Nuyorican"

Edwin Torres (born 1958) is a multidisciplinary poet and performance artist from New York City. He is the author of many books of poetry including; Feel Recordings in the Evershift, Quanundrum: i will be your many angled thing (American Book Award winner), Xoeteox: the infinite word object, Ameriscopia, and editor of The Body In Language: An Anthology. He has performed his bodylingo poetics worldwide, incorporating visual poetics in printed form and vocal and physical improvisation in performance. He also has a number of recordings, including; Sublingual Infinities, Parallel Infinities, Cicadelica: poetry w/cicadas, Novo, and Holy Kid. His art and writing practice avoid easy categorization, attached to many schools of poetry, including; Experimental, Nuyorican, Performance, Concrete, Black Mountain, NY School and L=A=N=G=U=A=G=E.

== Early years ==
Torres's parents moved from Puerto Rico during the 1950's migration and settled in the borough of The Bronx in New York City. His father died when he was young and he was then raised by his mother, along with uncles on both father and mother's side providing unique and disparate father figures. He received his primary and secondary education in New York.

== Graphic Design ==
In 1980 Torres began working as a graphic designer in a packaging design firm in midtown, where he learned how to create comps of packages from tracing paper and magic markers for the toy manufacturer Hasbro, including many G.I. Joe kits. He then worked as a Type Director at the advertising agency, J. Walter Thompson when it was located in The Graybar Building at Grand Central Station. His job was to work with Art Directors to design, calculate, kern and order typography from metal type shops, for corresponding headlines and body copy which would match the aesthetic of their sketched-out ads.

At this time he lived in New York City's East Village, an especially creative cultural moment for the art world, with new art galleries, music venues, and underground after hours clubs. He was fueled by the neighborhood's relentless energy which matched his search as a Twenty-Something Neo-Boricua style warrior.

He left his position as Type Director to expand into other aspects of graphic design, becoming an Art Director for Island Magazine, a lifestyle/fashion/art magazine based in the East Village, while maintaining a freelance design business for a number of years. In 1984, he started working full time as Sr. Graphic Designer for the newly established Software Division at Scholastic Inc. In 1988, he worked as the Design Director at an ad agency, Margeotes, Fertita & Weiss, based in Nolita, between East and West Village. Dedicated to sleepless nights in the pursuit of typography and design as world-changing disciplines, he was being recognized in the design world with awards, when he discovered performance and poetry in the late 80's through various independent theater venues in the East Village like Dixon Place, PS 122, The Pyramid Lounge, Club 57, Club Nada and Gargoyle Mecanique, among others.

While continuing to write and perform throughout the 2000's he worked as an Art Director at ad agencies like, McCann Erickson Worldwide, Momentum and William Morris Endeavor, designing ad campaigns for global clients like, Revlon, Bacardi, Drambuie, Paramount and the Oxygen Network. The visual and populist aspects of the advertising world along with the dynamic between consumer and product, added a larger dimension of social commentary into his writing.

== Nuyorican Poets Cafe ==
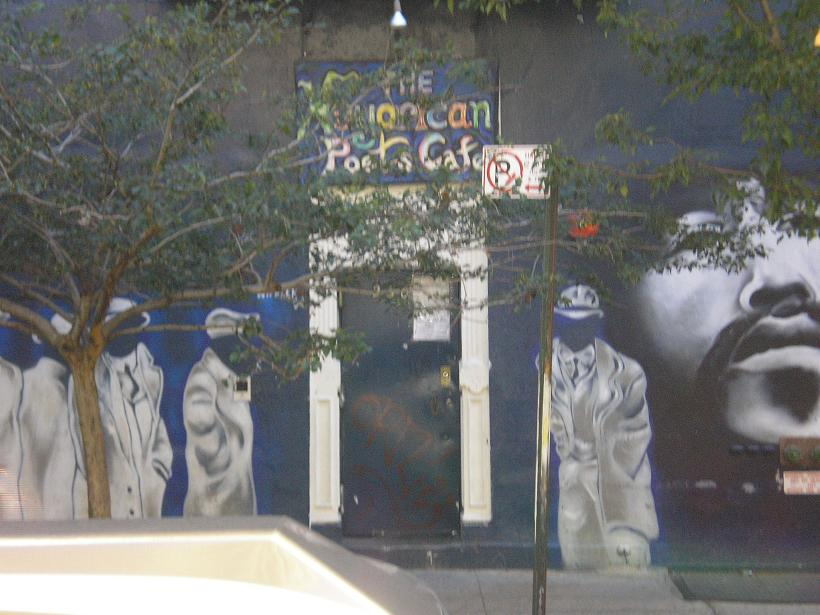
Nuyorican Poets Cafe

It was late 1987, when Torres invented a performance movement which he called "Interactive Eclecticism," as a private protest against the many self-driven monologues happening in performance art at the time. Developed at legendary downtown performance venue, Dixon Place — which was a ground floor walk-through apartment with the "theater" being the living room — I.E. performances consisted of interactive audience participation, along with an eclectic variety show of songs and skits questioning the audience's involvement with surreal breakdowns of the fourth wall. What started in I.E. (aka: I Edwin) as sketches became the seeds of poems to be developed over the years.

In 1989, he discovered the word "Nuyorican" (New York Puerto Rican) and that he was a native of this hybrid in-between identity, when he found out about the Nuyorican Poets Cafe, which was located a few blocks from his apartment in The East Village. The cafe and its poetry life inspired his creative instincts, not only opening its doors for his performance ideas to take shape, but to discover a newly awakened sense of heritage, and a new world of reading poetry. It was here that Torres created the "Poets Neurotica", where dancers and musicians performed alongside two to four poets, as he directed each group with/against each other. This helped begin his artistic practice of using the creative process as a way of telling a story, which transformed how he would write and create art throughout his career. From 1993–99, he was an original touring member of "Nuyorican Poets Live" which then became "Real Live Poetry," performing and holding workshops across the US and overseas.

Torres has represented New York in the 1992 National Poetry Slam, celebrated in Boston, and he has won the Nuyorican Poets Cafe First Annual Prize for Poetry with his poem "Po-Mo Griot".

He has also appeared on MTV's Spoken Word Unplugged and the Charlie Rose Show and been featured on Newsweek, in Rolling Stone Magazine and in New York Magazine. His poem, "I Saw Your Empire State Building" was included in the book, Words In Your Face: A Guided Tour Through Twenty Years of the New York City Poetry Slam in the chapter which dealt with the poetry slam community's response to 9/11, and his work has appeared in numerous anthologies such as Aloud: Voices from the Nuyorican Poets Cafe, Short Fuse: The Global Anthology of New Fusion Poetry, and Heights of the Marvelous: A New York Anthology, among many others.

== St. Marks Poetry Project ==
In Jan of 1990, he first performed at The Poetry Project, located in St. Marks Church on 10th Street and 2nd Ave. His relationship with The Project would then continue for over 25 years, being invited to read and perform there, holding workshops, designing various conference materials, and participating as a board member. The Project and its historical experimental lineage helped shape the development of his poetics, which were expanding beyond his performance beginnings to include many approaches to writing.

== Other performances ==
Besides performing at the Nuyorican Poets Cafe and The Poetry Project, Torres has performed at the Guggenheim Museum, Lincoln Center for the Performing Arts and the Museum of Modern Art, amongst other venues.

== Written works ==
Torres' poems include:

- "15 Minutes";
- "Gigabyte Me - How Much Ram In Your Summer Of Love?";
- "Lessering In Lessage";
- "Lounging In The Age Of Aquarius";
- "Mirror-Fucation";
- "Mister Hay's Trippy Moebius";
- "Peesacho";
- "Terra Quad"

Torres' books:

- Feel Recordings In The Evershift
- Illusions To Awakening (limited edition linocut book)
- Quanundrum: i will be your many angled thing
- The Animal's Perception of Earth
- The Body In Language: An Anthology
- Xoeteox: the infinite word object
- Ameriscopia
- Ilusos (makeshift chapbook)
- One Night: Poems for the Sleepy
- Yes Thing No Thing
- In the Function of External Circumstances
- The PoPedology of an Ambient Language
- Please
- Onomalingua: noise songs and poetry
- The All-Union Day of the Shock Worker
- Fractured Humorous
- Lung Poetry (chapbook)
- I Hear Things People Haven't Really Said (chapbook)
- SandHomméNomadNo (chapbook)

== See also ==
- List of Puerto Rican writers
- List of Puerto Ricans
- Puerto Rican poetry
- Puerto Rican literature
