= The Poetry Collection =

Collection at the University at Buffalo Libraries

A University at Buffalo Libraries Special Collection, The Poetry Collection is a collection devoted to 20th-century poetry in English and English translation. Founded in 1937 by professor and poet Charles D. Abbott, the university's first director of libraries, it was the first institutional repository in the United States to systematically collect modern poetry and contemporary poets' working manuscripts. It was followed by similar collections at Yale University, Princeton University, the Library of Congress, and many other institutions.

The Poetry Collection contains over 140,000 titles of Anglophone poetry, making it the largest poetry library of its kind in North America. Also included in the collection are recordings of poets reading from their own works, poets' notebooks; letters and manuscripts; and 9,000 titles of past and current periodicals including literary journals and "little magazines".

In addition, there are more than 150 named collections of poets' archives and manuscripts. Best known is the James Joyce Collection, which was added to the Poetry Collection between 1950 and 1968 in six installments from four main sources. Reproduced manuscripts from the collection in facsimile were compiled and published as The James Joyce Archive in 1978.

Poet Robert Graves sold his manuscripts to the Poetry Collection in 1960. In 2012, physics professor emeritus Jonathan Reichert gifted his father's personal collection of Robert Frost's archives as the Victor E. Reichert Robert Frost Collection.
