= National Coalition of Independent Scholars =

American non-profit association

The National Coalition of Independent Scholars (NCIS) is the principal professional association for independent scholars. Though incorporated in the USA, NCIS has an international membership, and is a non-profit organization that supports independent scholars. These scholars are defined as persons who are actively pursuing knowledge in an academic or scientific discipline without secure employment in or support from an academic institution. Independent scholars include unaffiliated scholars, adjunct professors and part-time faculty, graduate students, research professionals, artists, and curators. NCIS enables scholars working in the arts, humanities, social sciences and STEM fields to access and share resources, such as library access, and support, which are typically unavailable to researchers who are not affiliated with a university or other institution.

An issue of great concern to independent scholars is the lack of access to libraries and journals, lack of funding, and isolation from the rest of the academic community. NCIS therefore provides discounted access to JSTOR and other academic resources, offers grants for research projects, grants for conference attendance, academic conferences, and facilitates networking opportunities such as Facebook and Twitter, discipline-based online groups and local organizations of independent scholars.

NCIS recognizes regional and international partner groups in Europe, the USA and Australia, and is itself an affiliate of the American Historical Association.

== History ==
In the United States, the independent scholarship movement grew in the 1970s in response to the increasing number of scholars who were not affiliated with an academic institution. Following the establishment of several early, regionally based independent scholars' societies such as the Institute for Research in History, the Princeton Research Forum, the Centre for Independent Studies, and the Alliance of Independent Scholars, the independent scholar community recognized the need for a national organization to represent independent scholars' interests on a national level.

In 1986, the San Diego Independent Scholars sponsored a national conference aimed at reaching a consensus for founding a national organization which would communicate with institutions such as federal funding agencies, foundations, and learned societies, to address issues of access to research funding, research facilities, and other resources, as well as to provide a forum for scholarly exchange. Conference attendees expressed the need for a national newsletter and, in 1987, the first issue of The Independent Scholar was published. The first Board of the National Coalition of Independent Scholars was elected in 1988, and the organization was officially incorporated in 1989.

== Conference activities ==
Since the founding conference in 1987, NCIS has organized national conferences in conjunction with partner groups.

- October 25, 1987: San Diego, CA, Founding conference
- December 1987: Institute for Historical Study, Oakland CA, "Scholarship for Love and Money" (regional conference)
- March 28, 1988: Center for Independent Study, New Haven CT, (regional conference)
- April 7, 1990: Cambridge, MA, “Women Mystery Story Writers” (one-day conference co-sponsored by NCIS)
- April 23-25 1993: Chevy Chase, MD, “Independent Scholars in the 1990s: Intellectual and Practical Issues” (first official NCIS conference)
- October 21-23, 1994: Oakland, CA, “Independent Scholars: Finding an Audience”
- May 3-5, 1996: Princeton, NJ, “Situating Scholarship”
- October 18, 1997: San Francisco, CA, "The Scholarly Imperative: What Inspires Independent Scholars?" (one-day conference)
- October 2-4, 1998: St. Paul, MN, "The Future of Scholarship: Independent?"
- October 27-29, 2000: Raleigh, NC, “Independent Scholars: the Public Intellectuals of the Future”
- October 4-6, 2002: Vancouver, BC, Canada
- October 15-17, 2004: New York, NY, “Independent Scholars: Coming of Age”
- October 8, 2005: Portland, OR, “Selling Your Scholarship: Writing Marketable Non-fiction” (one-day conference)
- June 16-18, 2006: Princeton, NJ, “Scholars Without Borders”
- October 25-26, 2008: Berkeley, CA
- June 18-21, 2015: Yale, New Haven, CT, “Traditions and Transitions: Independent Scholars and the Digital Landscape”
- June 21-23, 2019: University of Massachusetts, Amherst, MA, "Making Connections, Meeting Challenges" (celebrating 30 years of NCIS)

== Publications ==
In 1987, NCIS began publishing a print newsletter, The Independent Scholar, featuring articles by NCIS members, book reviews, announcements, and other news. In 2007 the publication switched to an open-access online platform. The final issue was published in 2014, when the online quarterly was retired and for a short time this was replaced by "TIS Blog". In 2015 an online, peer-reviewed journal was inaugurated. Also entitled The Independent Scholar (TIS) ISSN 2381-2400. TIS is an open-access journal through which the work of independent scholars is made available to a worldwide audience. Rigorously peer-reviewed general and themed volumes have since appeared regularly, with articles being published online on acceptance, and then appearing in the subsequent issue.

== Grants ==
NCIS offers two internal grants to support members’ academic activities, inviting applications for conference support grants and research grants three times a year. In 2016, NCIS honored the late Professor Elizabeth Eisenstein by reviving the Elizabeth Eisenstein Essay Prize. The Eisenstein Prize is awarded for the best essay by an NCIS member. The essay must have been published in a peer-reviewed journal or book within the previous two years.
