= Vandorn Hinnant =

Visual artist, poet, and educator

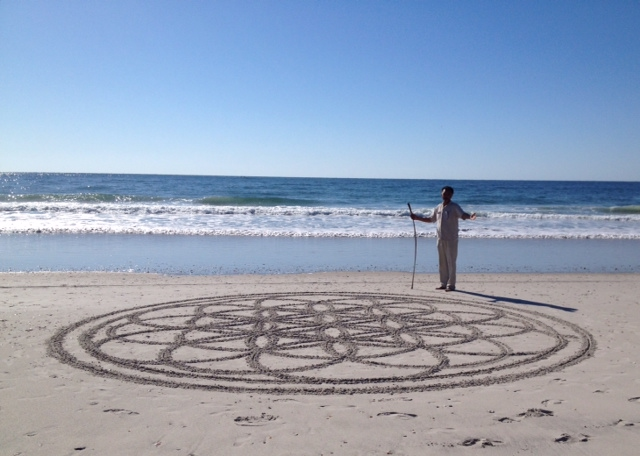
- Vandorn Hinnant and his flower of life diagram drawing in the sand called The Transformative Vision at Wrightsville Beach, NC, May, 2017.
- Born: 1953 (age 72–73)
- Education: North Carolina A&T University, University of North Carolina Greensboro

Vandorn Hinnant (born 1953) is a visual artist, poet and educator based in Durham, North Carolina.

== Early life and education ==
Hinnant grew up in Old Asheboro neighborhood in Greensboro, North Carolina. Hinnant received a Bachelor of Art's degree from North Carolina A&T University and attended at UNC Greensboro to study visual art. After college he moved to New York City and worked for the printmaker Josef Werner.

== Career ==
In 1988 Hinnant exhibited work based on the 13th century Fibonacci numbers and Lucas Pacioli's treatise. He began studying Sacred Geometry formally in 1989 with his mentor, inventor and physicist Robert L. Powell, Sr. In the 1980s Hinnant introduced fractal mathematics, the Golden Ratio, the Logarithmic Spiral, Sacred Geometery and most currently STEAM concepts into his work to explore metaphysical ideas. The ancient architectures in Egypt, India, Rome and Greece that use these concepts were his original influences, unpacking "pre-material template of energies," he said. Hinnant also has referenced Buckminster Fuller, Leonardo da Vinci, Frank Lloyd Wright and M.C. Escher as inspirations because of their use of geometry and math in making their artworks. Part of his objective is to catalyze dialogue through and around his work, connect these concepts to human relationships and encouraging education around the golden proportion.

In 1991 Hinnant was a founding member of the African American Atelier in Greensboro, of which he was a member of its first board. In 1999 he was a featured artist in Round 10 of Project Row Houses. His work was on display at Fayetteville Museum of Art in 1998 and 2006. In 2009 his work was in a two-person show with John Hiigli about math and structure. In 2011 Hinnant's work was included in an exhibition about mathematics through art at Antioch College. This exhibition also included work by Sol LeWitt, Karen Finley, DJ Spooky, Dread Scott, and John Sims.

In 2014 Hinnant's work was included in an exhibition about the golden ratio at the Saugerties Performing Arts Factory in New York. His work was also in an exhibition at The National Center for the Study of Civil Rights and African American Culture at Alabama State University. His work was included in the Museum of the Golden Ratio, a virtual museum of artworks. In 2015 there was a survey of Hinnant's work at North Carolina Central University Art Museum, the Winston-Salem State University and the Cameron Museum of Art in Wilmington, NC. In his exhibit at Winston-Salem State University's Diggs Gallery included a tribute installation called Inquiries and Destinations: A Sound Room for Terry Adkins, inspired and dedicated by the late artist.

In 2016 over forty of Hinnant's works, spanning 35 years, were featured at the Rosenthal Gallery at Fayetteville State University. His work was also included in an exhibition called African American Abstraction at City Gallery East in Atlanta that same year.

In 2017 Hinnant created two-story public sculpture, called Monument to Leadership, for Fayetteville State University's 150 year anniversary. The piece represented the pioneering vision of the school.

He was commissioned in 2018 by the city of Greensboro to design an artwork on the Bragg Street Downtown Greenway.

Hinnant's work is in public collections at the Atlanta International Airport, Wachovia Bank, Capital Broadcasting Company in Raleigh, NationsBank in Charlotte, Miller Brewing Company, Duke University Medical Center, Pfizer Pharmaceuticals, Brandywine Workshop Collection and the Cumberland County Public Library among others. His work is also featured at the Piedmont Triad International Airport. Hinnant was a 1994 recipient of the North Carolina Artist Fellowship.

=== Mandalas ===
Many of Hinnant's works explore mandalas, a visual spiritual and ritual symbol in Hinduism and Buddhism, representing the universe. He uses circles, lines, angles, polyhedrons and color and tint to explore mandalas in his drawings, paintings and sculpture which are often installed together.

=== Together We Rise ===
Hinnant's city-commissioned eleven-foot sculpture called Together We Rise was installed in Corpening Plaza, Winston-Salem, North Carolina in 2014. He used geometry as a metaphor for the collaboration and harmony of the two different cities. The piece is stacked isosceles triangles made of stainless steel and commemorates the 100th anniversary of the two communities of Winston and Salem uniting in 1913. The surfaces of the triangles include text and images such as quotes by Maya Angelou and Margaret Mead and women activists who supported racial equality during the late 1800s, that helped to unpack its conceptual themes.

=== A Monument to Dignity and Respect ===
In 2019 Hinnant was commissioned by the group Action Greenway to create a public artwork for the section of the greenway located alongside the Ole Asheboro neighborhood in Greensboro, North Carolina—the neighborhood Hinnant grew up in. Hinnant used inspiration from neighborhood meetings concerning the project to create the piece for the greenway titled, A Monument to Dignity and Respect. This monument consists of two separate structures, a block apart, that work in dialogue with one another. Both structures sit on a metal trapezoid which has a plaque with three different quotes on it. The quotes on each plaque are from three different members of the Ole Asheboro neighborhood who were considered large forces in the neighborhood. On top of each trapezoid is a metal hand and arm that point to the sky. On one arm reads, "Dignity, united we stand". On the other arm reads, "Respect, together we rise". These structures were completed and installed in 2020.

The monument is meant to accomplish the following things—represent the Ole Asheboro community, pay tribute to the freedom fighters of African descent in North America as well as the pioneers of the civil rights movement, and work to encourage the continued global cause for human rights.
