= Augusta Read Thomas =

American composer (born 1964)

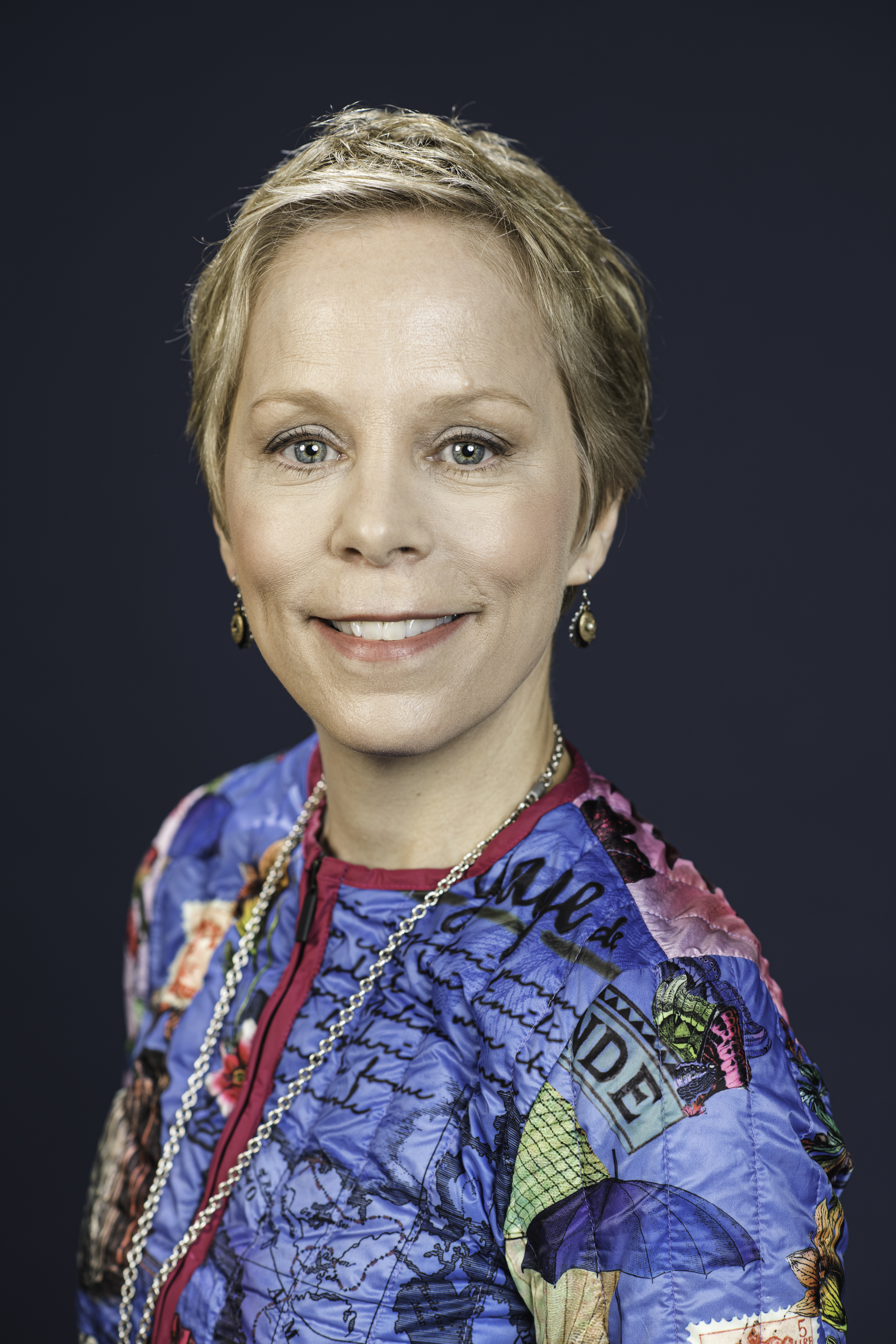
- Augusta Thomas in 2020
- Born: April 24, 1964 (age 62); Glen Cove, New York, U.S.
- Occupation: Composer
- Spouse: Bernard Rands (m. 1994; died 2026)
- Website: augustareadthomas.com

Augusta Read Thomas (born April 24, 1964) is an American composer and University Professor of Composition in the Department of Music at the University of Chicago, where she is also director of the Chicago Center for Contemporary Composition.

== Biography ==
Thomas studied composition with Oliver Knussen at the Tanglewood Music Center; Jacob Druckman at Yale University; Alan Stout and Bill Karlins at Northwestern University; and at the Royal Academy of Music in London. She was a Bunting Fellow at Radcliffe College in 1990–91 and a Junior Fellow in the Society of Fellows at Harvard University from 1991 to 1994. Thomas was the longest-serving Mead Composer-in-Residence with the Chicago Symphony Orchestra, from 1997 to 2006. This residency culminated in the premiere of Astral Canticle for solo flute, solo violin, and orchestra, a finalist for the 2007 Pulitzer Prize in Music. During her residency, Thomas premiered nine commissioned orchestral works and helped establish the MusicNOW series.

A former chairperson of the American Music Center, she is on many boards and, according to Wise Music Classical, "has become one of the most recognizable and widely loved figures in American music."

Commissions include those from the Santa Fe Opera in collaboration with the San Francisco Opera and several other opera companies, PEAK Performances at Montclair State University and the Martha Graham Dance Company, The Cathedral Choral Society of Washington, D.C., the Indianapolis Symphony Orchestra, Tanglewood Music Festival, BBC Proms, Diotima Quartet and The Philharmonie of Paris, Sejong Soloists, the Kaleidoscope Chamber Orchestra, Des Moines Symphony, Boston Symphony, Utah Symphony, Wigmore Hall in London, Indianapolis Symphonic Choir, JACK quartet, Third Coast Percussion, Spektral Quartet, Chicago Philharmonic, Eugene Symphony, the Danish Chamber Players, Notre Dame University, Janet Sung, and the Fromm Foundation.

== Early life and education (1964–1989) ==
Thomas began taking piano lessons around age four and continued for about a decade. She began playing trumpet around age eight and continued through college, eventually enrolling as a trumpet performance major at Northwestern University. She began high school at St. Paul's School in Concord, New Hampshire, where she had already begun composing music.

After graduating from high school in 1983, Thomas enrolled at Northwestern University as a trumpet performance major while concurrently studying composition with Alan Stout and M. William Karlins. From 1986 to 1987, she studied composition with Oliver Knussen at Tanglewood, and in 1988 she studied with Jacob Druckman at Yale University. She completed her graduate studies at the Royal Academy of Music in London under Paul Patterson.

In 1989, after completing her studies, Thomas was awarded a Guggenheim Fellowship; at age 23, she was at the time the youngest woman to have received the honor. She was subsequently elected an Associate of the Royal Academy of Music (ARAM) and became a Fellow of the Royal Academy of Music (FRAM) in 2004.

== Career ==
In 1994, Thomas married the British composer Bernard Rands. In 1997, the Boston Symphony Orchestra and cellist Mstislav Rostropovich premiered cello concertos by Thomas and Rands at Symphony Hall in Boston and Carnegie Hall in New York.

Thomas taught at the Eastman School of Music from 1993 to 2001, and received tenure after three years on the faculty. While at Eastman, she was appointed Mead Composer in Residence with the Chicago Symphony Orchestra by Pierre Boulez and Daniel Barenboim, and held the position from 1997 to 2006. She is the longest-serving composer in that role. Her residency included the premiere of nine commissioned orchestral works and the establishment of the MusicNOW series. Her residency culminated in the 2007 premiere of her work Astral Canticle, a finalist for the Pulitzer Prize in Music.

She then joined the faculty at Northwestern University, where she was a professor of composition until 2008. In 2010, she joined the University of Chicago as University Professor of Composition. In 2018, Thomas founded the Chicago Center for Contemporary Composition (CCCC) at the University of Chicago. The center includes the Grossman Ensemble, which supports emerging and established composers and performers.

In October 2016, Thomas envisioned and spearheaded the Ear Taxi Festival in Chicago, a multi-day event showcasing local new music ensembles, musicians, and composers with numerous world premieres. She served as Board Chair of the American Music Center from 2005 to 2008. She has also served as Vice President for Music at the American Academy of Arts and Letters and is a member of the American Academy of Arts and Sciences.

=== Commissions ===
Thomas has been commissioned by the Santa Fe Opera in collaboration with the San Francisco Opera and several other opera companies, PEAK Performances at Montclair State University and the Martha Graham Dance Company, the Cathedral Choral Society of Washington, D.C., the Indianapolis Symphony Orchestra, Tanglewood Music Festival, BBC Proms, Diotima Quartet and The Philharmonie of Paris, Sejong Soloists, the Kaleidoscope Chamber Orchestra, Des Moines Symphony, Boston Symphony, Utah Symphony, Wigmore Hall in London, Indianapolis Symphonic Choir, JACK quartet, Third Coast Percussion, Spektral Quartet, Chicago Philharmonic, Eugene Symphony, the Danish Chamber Players, Notre Dame University, Janet Sung, and the Fromm Foundation.

=== Additional positions ===
- Member of the Board of Directors of The Koussevitzky Foundation
- Member of the Board of Directors of The Aaron Copland Fund for Music
- Member of the Board of Directors of the Alice M. Ditson Fund, Columbia University
- Member of the Conseil Musical de la Fondation Prince Pierre de Monaco
- Member of the Board of Trustees, American Society for the Royal Academy of Music, London
- Member of the Eastman National Council, Eastman School of Music
- Member of the advisory board of Third Coast Percussion
- Member of the advisory board of the Civitas Ensemble
- Member of the advisory board of the Picosa Ensemble
- Member of the International Contemporary Ensemble Board of Directors (2007–2013)

== Selected awards and honors ==
- Finalist for the Pulitzer Prize for Music (2007) for Astral Canticle
- Named "Chicagoan of the Year" by Chicago magazine (2016)
- Made a Chevalier of the Order of Cultural Merit by the Sovereign Prince of Monaco (2015)
- Recipient of the Order of Lincoln, the state of Illinois's highest honor (2014)
- Recommended Work selection at the UNESCO International Rostrum of Composers for Ceremonial (2001)
- Academy Award in Music from the American Academy of Arts and Letters (2001)
- Ernst von Siemens Composer Prize (2000)
- Grammy Award contribution for Chanticleer's album Colors of Love, which featured two of her compositions (2000)
- International Orpheus Prize for chamber opera Ligeia (1991)
- Columbia University Joseph H. Bearns Prize (1991)

== Selected works ==
Thomas's compositions include works for orchestra, opera, chorus, chamber ensembles, and solo instruments. A complete catalogue of her compositions is available through her publisher and official website.

=== Opera ===
- Sweet Potato Kicks the Sun (2019)

=== Orchestral ===
- Cello Concerto No. 1 – Vigil (1990), for cello and chamber orchestra
- Words of the Sea (1995), for orchestra
- Violin Concerto No. 1 – Spirit Musings (1997), for violin and ensemble
- Concerto for Orchestra – Orbital Beacons (1998)
- Ceremonial (1999), for orchestra
- Astral Canticle (2005), double concerto for violin, flute, and orchestra
- Helios Choros (2007–2008), orchestral trilogy
- Violin Concerto No. 3 – Juggler in Paradise (2008)
- Resounding Earth (2012), for percussion quartet and chamber orchestra
- EOS (Goddess of the Dawn) (2015), for orchestra
- Brio (2018), for orchestra

=== Choral ===
- Alleluia (Midsummer Blaze) (1993), for a cappella SATB choir
- The Rub of Love (1995), for a cappella SATB choir
- Ring Out Wild Bells, to the Wild Sky (2000), for soprano, choir, and orchestra
- Chanting to Paradise (2002), for soprano, choir, and orchestra
- Sunlight Echoes (2002), for choir and orchestra
- Far Past War (2020), for choir and orchestra

=== Chamber ===
- Fugitive Star (2000), for string quartet
- Invocations (2000), for string quartet
- Rumi Settings (2001), for violin and cello
- Passion Prayers (1999), for chamber ensemble
- Selene (2015), for percussion quartet and string quartet
- Helix Spirals (2015), for string quartet
- Acrobats (2018), for chamber ensemble
- Magic Box (2019), for percussion quartet and strings

=== Solo instrumental ===
- Six Etudes (1996–2005), for solo piano
- Traces (2006), for solo piano
- Starlight Ribbons (2013), for solo piano
- Rainbow Bridge to Paradise (2016), for solo cello, violin, or viola
- Amalgam (2021), for solo piano
