= Carey Mercer =

Canadian musician

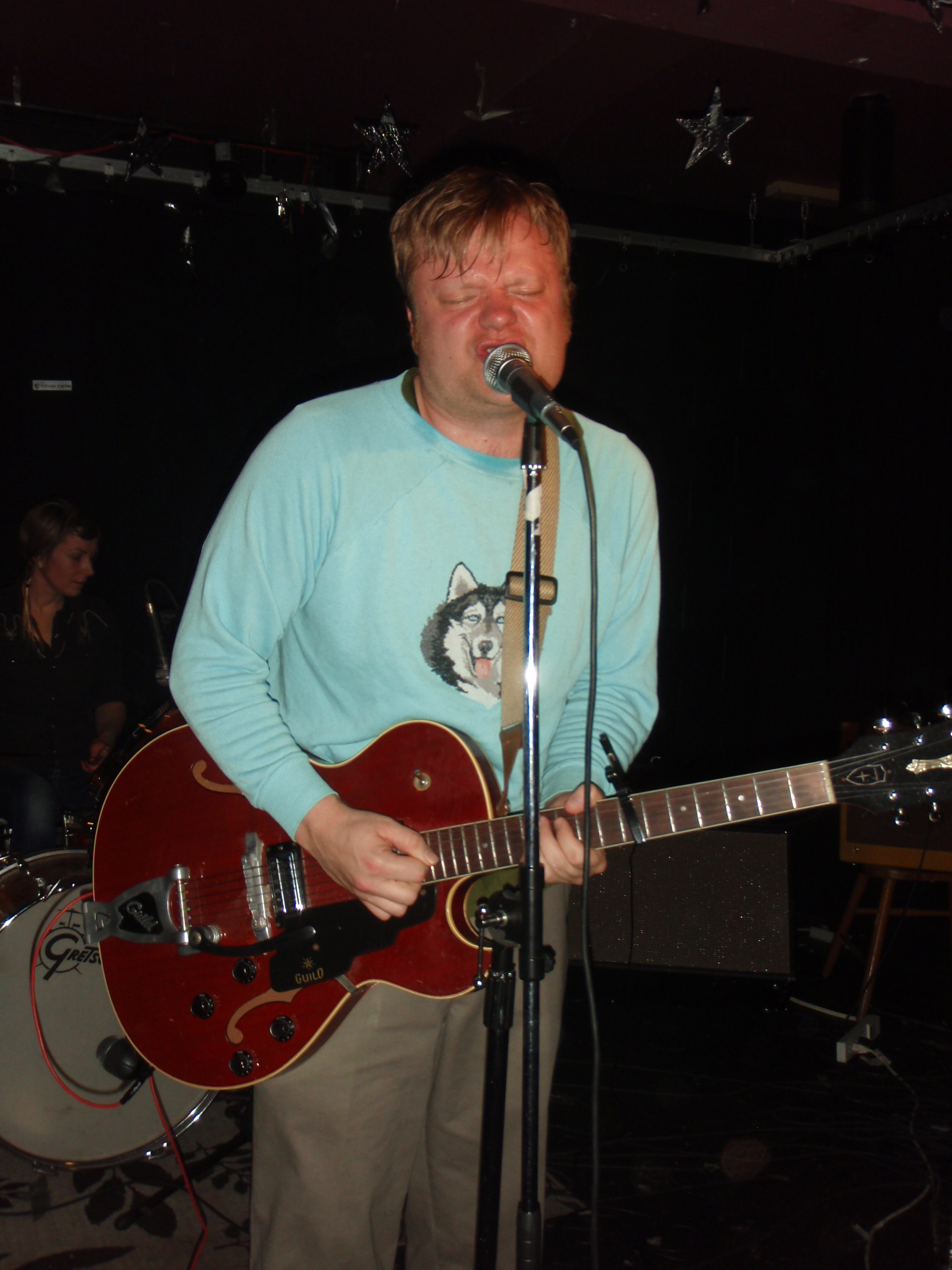
- Carey Mercer 2008.

Background information
- Born: 1975 (age 50–51)
- Origin: Okanagan, British Columbia, Canada
- Genre: Indie rock
- Years active: 1994–present
- Labels: Jagjaguwar, Absolutely Kosher, Global Symphonic, Dead Oceans, Soft Abuse

Carey Mercer (born c. 1975) is a Canadian musician best known for his work as lead singer of the indie rock band Frog Eyes and his work in Swan Lake, Blackout Beach, and The Republic of Freedom Fighters.

== Overview ==
Following the breakup of the Canadian indie rock band Blue Pine in 2001, members Mercer and Michael Rak reunited to form a new group. Recruiting Mercer's roommate Spencer Krug and wife Melanie Campbell, the four began writing music under the moniker Frog Eyes.

Mercer also began writing music on the side for his solo project Blackout Beach, and in 2004, released the album Light Flows the Putrid Dawn through Soft Abuse Records. His follow-up, Skin of Evil was released January 27, 2009. In November 2011, he released Fuck Death on Dead Oceans. Mercer, his longtime drummer and wife Melanie Campbell, and Dante Decaro re-recorded these takes into the record Blues Trip, released digitally by the band and on vinyl by Soft Abuse Records on February 18, 2013.

In 2006, Mercer teamed up with comrades Spencer Krug (of Sunset Rubdown and Wolf Parade) and Dan Bejar (of Destroyer and The New Pornographers) to form the supergroup Swan Lake. The band released Beast Moans through Jagjaguwar Records on November 21, 2006. Enemy Mine, the second album from Swan Lake was released on March 24, 2009.

On March 25, 2020, Mercer announced he was forming a new band called Soft Plastics. He also announced the band's debut album, titled 5 Dreams, and released the single "Rope off the Tigers".

== Discography ==
=== Republic of Freedom Fighters ===
- Republic of Freedom Fighters LP (1996) Mountain Collective/Linkwork

=== Blue Pine ===
- Blue Pine LP (2001) Global Symphonic

=== Frog Eyes ===
- Emboldened Navigator EP (2003) Soft Abuse
- The Bloody Hand (2002) Global Symphonic
- The Golden River (2003) Animal World/Global Symphonic
- The Folded Palm (2004) Absolutely Kosher
- Ego Scriptor (2004) Absolutely Kosher
- The Future Is Inter-Disciplinary or Not at All (2006) Acuarela
- Tears of the Valedictorian (2007) Absolutely Kosher
- Paul's Tomb: A Triumph (2010) Dead Oceans
- Carey's Cold Spring (2013) self-released
- Pickpocket's Locket (2015) Paper Bag Records
- Violet Psalms (2018) Paper Bag Records
- The Bees (2022) Paper Bag Records
- The Open Up (2025) Paper Bag Records

=== Blackout Beach ===
- Light Flows the Putrid Dawn (2004) Soft Abuse
- Skin of Evil (2009) Soft Abuse
- Fuck Death (2011) Dead Oceans
- 11 Pink Helicopters in the Coral Sky (2012) Self-Released
- Blues Trip (2013) Soft Abuse

=== Soft Plastics ===
- 5 Dreams (2020) Paper Bag Records

=== Swan Lake ===
- Beast Moans (2006) Jagjaguwar
- Enemy Mine (2009) Jagjaguwar
