= Tears of the Valedictorian =

Studio album by Frog Eyes
- Released: May 1, 2007
- Genre: Indie rock
- Length: 36:14
- Label: Absolutely Kosher
- Producers: Carey Mercer, Daryl Smith

Frog Eyes chronology
The Future Is Inter-Disciplinary or Not at All (2006)	Tears of the Valedictorian (2007)	Paul's Tomb: A Triumph (2010)

Tears of the Valedictorian is a 2007 album by Canadian indie rock band Frog Eyes. It has received high critical praise, with Pitchfork declaring it "one of their best full-lengths to date" and "recommending" the album.

The album's first single, "Bushels," also received praise when it was released on Pitchfork on February 1.

== Critical reception ==
Professional ratings
Aggregate scores
Source	Rating
Metacritic	81/100
Review scores
Source	Rating
AllMusic	4.5/5 stars
The A.V. Club	B
Cokemachineglow	88%
Drowned in Sound	8/10
Pitchfork	8.5/10
PopMatters	6/10
Spin	3.5/5 stars
Stylus	B
Tiny Mix Tapes	4/5 stars
Under the Radar	8/10

AllMusic's James Christopher Monger said the album showcases Frog Eyes' "uncanny talent for creating manic, beautiful, and upsetting songs that seem to exists wholly for themselves", praising Carey Mercer's rabid vocal delivery and the band's penchant for pushing pop music into different territories. Andrew Gaerig of Stylus Magazine praised Mercer for revitalizing his band after 2004's The Folded Palm with a "beautifully constructed" and "phenomenally produced record" that's neither generic or indulgent, saying "he constructed a taut, concise Frog Eyes album that retains the band's signature sound without delving into repetition or trope." Josh Berquist from PopMatters was mixed on Mercer dialing back his vocalization and guitar playing throughout the record to refine his manic artistry and the production that stripped the tracks of the "atmospheric allure" found on previous projects, concluding that: "Ultimately, Mercer's ugliest moments are also his most flattering, which makes Tears of the Valedictorian a mild disappointment that leaves listeners longing for something more unhinged."

== Track listing ==
1. "Idle Songs" – 2:24
2. "Caravan Breakers, They Prey on the Weak and the Old" – 7:35
3. ""Stockades"" – 3:27
4. "Reform the Countryside" – 5:24
5. "The Policy Merchant, the Silver Bay" 2:31
6. "Evil Energy, the Ill Twin of..." – 2:42
7. "...Eagle Energy" – 1:52
8. "Bushels" – 9:13
9. "My Boats They Go" – 1:02

== Personnel ==
Frog Eyes (on this record)

- Carey Mercer – vocals, guitar; co-producer; engineer (tracks 3, 5, 9); paintings
- McCloud Zicmuse – guitar
- Spencer Krug – keyboards
- Michael W. Rak – bass
- Melanie Campbell – drums

Production

- Daryl Smith – co-producer; engineering and mixing (tracks 1–4, 6, 8)
- Joby Baker – assistant engineer (tracks 1, 2, 4)
- Harris Newman – mastering
- Tolan McNeil – sequencing
- Daniel Murphy layout
