= Hallelujah Anyhow =

Studio album by Hiss Golden Messenger
- Released: September 22, 2017
- Length: 36:16
- Label: Merge Records

Hiss Golden Messenger chronology
Heart Like a Levee (2016)	Hallelujah Anyhow (2017)	Terms of Surrender (2018)

Professional ratings
Aggregate scores
Source	Rating
AnyDecentMusic?	7.7/10
Metacritic	80/100
Review scores
Source	Rating
AllMusic	4/5 stars
The A.V. Club	B+
Blurt	3/5 stars
Classic Rock	3/5 stars
The Line of Best Fit	8.5/10
Paste	8.6/10
Pitchfork	7.9/10

Hallelujah Anyhow is the eighth studio album by American band Hiss Golden Messenger. It was released on September 22, 2017 under Merge Records.

== Critical reception ==
Hallelujah Anyhow was met with generally favorable reviews from critics. At Metacritic, which assigns a weighted average rating out of 100 to reviews from mainstream publications, this release received an average score of 80, based on 15 reviews.

=== Accolades ===
Accolades for Hallelujah Anyhow
Publication	Accolade	Rank	Ref.
Uncut	Top 75 Albums of 2017	27	
Uproxx	Top 50 Albums of 2017	20	

== Track listing ==
Hallelujah Anyhow track listing
No.	Title	Length
1.	"Jenny of the Roses"	3:38
2.	"Lost Out in the Darkness"	3:22
3.	"Jaw"	3:13
4.	"Harder Rain"	4:15
5.	"I Am the Song"	2:48
6.	"Gulfport You've Been on My Mind"	4:41
7.	"John the Gun"	3:27
8.	"Domino (Time Will Tell)"	3:45
9.	"Caledonia, My Love"	3:00
10.	"When the Wall Comes Down"	4:07

== Charts ==
Chart performance for Hallelujah Anyhow
Chart (2017)	Peak position
US Americana/Folk Albums (Billboard)	25
US Independent Albums (Billboard)	28
