= The Bloody Hand =

Studio album by Frog Eyes
- Released: February 2002
- Recorded: 2001
- Genre: Indie rock
- Label: Global Symphonic

Frog Eyes chronology
The Bloody Hand (2002)	The Golden River (2003)

Professional ratings
Review scores
Source	Rating
Allmusic	3/5 stars
Pitchfork Media	(8.6/10)

The Bloody Hand is the debut album by Frog Eyes, and was released in 2002 on Global Symphonic Records. The album was reissued by Absolutely Kosher Records on April 18, 2006 with nine extra tracks.

== Track listing ==
2002 release

1. "Sound Travels from the Snow to the Dark"
2. "The Fox Speaks to His Wife Who is Not Quite Sure"
3. "Krull Fire Wedding"
4. "The Mayor Laments the Failures of His Many Townsfolk"
5. "Our Lordship Has Devised a New Billing System"
6. "The Horse Used to Wear a Crown"
7. "The Fruit that Fell From the Tree"
8. "Silence But for the Gentle Tinkling of the Flowing Creek"
9. "The Secret Map Has Mistakes"
10. "The Hardest Night to Sleep in the Swamplands"
11. "Libertatia's National Lullaby"

== Seagull Is on the Rise ==
The reissue of this album contained the unreleased album by Blue Pine, the band that would evolve into Frog Eyes, called Seagull Is On The Rise. Blue Pine consisted of Carey Mercer, Michael Rak, Eric Nyburg, and Jana Wessel.

== Track listing ==
12. "(Intermission)"
13. "Seagulls on the Rise"
14. "One Considers Sailing On"
15. "Tyranny of Sight and Tyranny of Seeing"
16. "Picture Framing"
17. "Buttercup"
18. "Drinking: The Song"
19. "Body Body"
20. "Lost in a Godless Sea"
21. "Before They Was Killed in a Car Crash"

== Personnel ==
Frog Eyes – The Bloody Hand

- Carey Mercer – vocals, guitar, paintings
- Spencer Krug – keyboards
- Michael Rak – bass
- Melanie Campbell – drums
- Tolen McNeil – recording (1–5, 8, 9, 11), mastering
- Frog Eyes – recording (6, 7, 10)

Blue Pine – Seagull Is on the Rise

- Carey Mercer – vocals, guitar, clavinet, Fender Rhodes, mixing (13–21)
- Eric Nyburg – guitar (13–21)
- Michael Rak – bass (13–21)
- Lily Fawn – drums, saw (13–21)
- Scott Henderson – recording, mixing (13–21)
- Tolan McNeil – mastering (13–21)
