= Fag Patrol =

Compilation album by Xiu Xiu
- Released: May 27, 2003
- Genres: Experimental; indie folk
- Length: 34:04
- Label: Free Porcupine

Xiu Xiu chronology
A Promise (2003)	Fag Patrol (2003)	Fabulous Muscles (2004)

Professional ratings
Review scores
Source	Rating
Pitchfork	7.8/10

Fag Patrol is a collection of acoustic Xiu Xiu tracks. Originally, it was only released on CD. A limited edition vinyl was released on January 15, 2021.

== Track listing ==
No.	Title	Origin	Length
1.	"Helsabot"	Accordion Solo!	5:03
2.	"King Earth, King Earth"	Accordion Solo! / Chapel of the Chimes	5:40
3.	"20,000 Deaths for Eidelyn Gonzalez, 20,000 Deaths for Jamie Peterson"	A Promise	2:48
4.	"Dr. Troll"	Knife Play	4:17
5.	"Jennifer Lopez"	Chapel of the Chimes	2:07
6.	"Brooklyn Dodgers"	A Promise	3:40
7.	"Asleep" (Morrissey/Marr)	The Smiths cover	3:38
8.	"I Broke Up"	Knife Play	3:27
9.	"Nieces Pieces"	Fabulous Muscles	3:24
Total length:			34:04
