= Jukeboxer in the Food Chain =

Studio album by Jukeboxer
- Released: September 28, 2004
- Genre: Electronic
- Length: 38:56
- Label: Absolutely Kosher Records
- Producer: Jukeboxer

Jukeboxer chronology
Jukeboxer Learns the Alphabet (2001)	Jukeboxer in the Food Chain (2004)

Professional ratings
Review scores
Source	Rating
Allmusic	link
PopMatters	Positive link
Prefix Magazine	3.5/5) link

Jukeboxer In The Food Chain is an album released in 2004 by Jukeboxer. The songs were constructed digitally using music editing programs. It was recorded at Noah Wall's home in Brooklyn.

== Track listing ==
1. Pilgrim – 6:35 {Wall}
2. Missing Link – 3:08 {Wall}
3. Chance Openings – 3:24 {Wall}
4. Banj – 2:29 {Wall}
5. Thursday – 3:25 {Wall}
6. Terrestrial – 3:07 {Wall}
7. Opportunist – 4:05 {Wall}
8. My Eyes Are Only – 2:30 {Wall}
9. Dooey – 0:58 [Wall]
10. Russian Doll – 2:07 {Wall}
11. House Burning Down – 7:03 {Wall}

== Personnel ==
- Noah Wall – All instruments
- Amy Jones – Vocals
- Tim Barnes – Tabla on "Banj"
- Gillian Chadwick – Vocals on "Opportunist"
- Aaron Mullan – Acoustic guitar on "Russian Doll"
- Lyrics by Noah Wall, Amy Jones, Gillian Chadwick, David Chadwick, Matt Elkind, Paul Erb
- Mastering by John Golden
- Cover photo by Jaap Buitendijk
