= The Meadowlands (album) =

Studio album by the Wrens
- Released: September 9, 2003
- Recorded: January 1999 – February 2003
- Genre: Indie rock
- Length: 56:13
- Labels: Absolutely Kosher (US); LO-MAX (UK & Europe; BB*Island (GSA))
- Producers: Pedal Boy, the Wrens

The Wrens chronology
| Secaucus (1996) | The Meadowlands (2003) |

The Meadowlands is the third and final studio album by American indie rock band the Wrens, released by Absolutely Kosher Records on September 9, 2003, and in the UK two years later on September 19, 2005 by LO-MAX Records and in Germany by BB*Island. Recording of the album originally began in January 1999, but writer's block and a loss of faith in the tracks they were recording meant the band took four years to complete the album, with many songs being rewritten or scrapped as recording proceeded.

Named after the New Jersey Meadowlands, the wetlands near the Wrens' home in New Jersey, The Meadowlands was greeted with universal critical acclaim on its release.

== Recording ==
Recording of the album began in January 1999, after the band had spent the whole of the previous year courting record labels following their departure from Grass Records. Drummer Jerry MacDonald had married and moved out of the house that all four band members had shared when younger, but the other three members remained living in the house in Fort Lee, New Jersey where the album was recorded, MacDonald joining them when circumstances allowed to record his drum parts. However, an album that was supposed to be recorded in a few weeks ended up taking four years to complete. It is commonly believed that the circumstances regarding the Wrens split from Grass Records was the main factor preventing the band from making new music (the label halted all distribution and promotion of the Wrens' previous two albums after the band turned down a new recording contract, worried that they would be forced to change to a more mainstream sound). However, in an interview in 2004 guitarist Charles Bissell said that exhaustion and loss of confidence in their writing was a more decisive reason:

"We did spend a couple years dealing with lawyers and labels. But after we released an EP in '97, we were at a plateau with our music. We weren't moving forward anymore. We were sort of exhausted. I had lost perspective and didn't know what was good anymore and couldn't write lyrics. We needed to crank out another album, but weren't sure why... There seemed to be no end in sight because every song sucked, every idea was bad. We didn't know what to do."

After a couple of years of rewriting and scrapping entire tracks, the band hired engineer Alan Douches to master the tracks, and the introduction of a non-judgemental outsider helped to lift the pressure and move the recording process along. After taking a rest during the summer of 2002, the band went back into the studio between November 2002 and February 2003 to complete recording and re-sequence the album.

When recording had started in 1999, the Wrens had originally agreed to release the new album on Drive-Thru Records owned by Richard and Stephanie Reines, friends of the band. However, by the time the album was ready the group decided that it did not fit with the typical sound of the bands on the Drive-Thru label and instead opted to release it on Absolutely Kosher Records, run by another friend of theirs, Cory Brown. The album was eventually released in the UK and Europe two years later by LO-MAX Records.

The story goes that at the end of the recording process, the band threw a party where they deliberately wiped the master ADAT tapes of the album to celebrate finally completing it: Bissell later clarified that although this had indeed happened, the tapes were only one of several copies that the band had made.

== Reception ==
Professional ratings
Aggregate scores
| Source | Rating |
|---|---|
| Metacritic | 85/100 |
Review scores
| Source | Rating |
| AllMusic | 4/5 stars |
| Mojo | 4/5 stars |
| NME | 9/10 |
| Pitchfork | 9.5/10 |
| Q | 2/5 stars |
| Stylus Magazine | A− |
| Tiny Mix Tapes | 5/5 |
| The Village Voice | A |

The Meadowlands was met with widespread acclaim from critics on its release in the United States, and The New York Times described it as a "nearly universally acclaimed disc of bright literate pop". Heather Phares of AllMusic suggested that the "sprawling, shifting" nature of The Meadowlands "perhaps [reflected] the fact that it took four years to create", and concluded that "when the results are this good, the time it took to make the album is more than justified." Ryan Schreiber of online music magazine Pitchfork stated that the album "exemplifies what every fan hopes for when a band announces a reunion or returns from more than a half-decade of silence." PopMatters' Jon Garrett wrote that The Meadowlands "manages to reveal the expanse of the Wrens’ vision without trading on their intimate charms." Robert Christgau, writing in The Village Voice, remarked: "I keep waiting for the moment when I need to put this away for a while, and it keeps not coming."

Following the album's positive reception in the United States, The Meadowlands was issued in September 2005 in the United Kingdom, where it was likewise met with glowing reviews. Dele Fadele of NME stated that "The Wrens are indeed a revelation: not only for some unique achievements within the stifling parameters of indie-rock, but for a raw emotionalism, well offset by vitriolic sarcasm... Beguiling, affecting songs are then shot through with noise cloudbursts, psychedelic harmonies and glissando melodies." However, Q was far less enthusiastic, describing The Meadowlands as "a tortuous travelogue in the life of a band who've snacked so long on the fuzzy end of the indie rock lolly, they've forgotten the euphoric qualities that made them merely a half-decent proposition to begin with."

Magnet named The Meadowlands its album of the year for 2003 in its January 2004 issue, and in the UK the Teletext music magazine Planet Sound placed the album at number 4 in its list of the Albums of the Year for 2005 (the year The Meadowlands was released in the UK). In 2009 Pitchfork placed The Meadowlands at number 88 on their list of top 200 albums of the 2000s decade.

== Track listing ==
All tracks are written by the Wrens.

| No. | Title | Lead vocals | Length |
|---|---|---|---|
| 1. | "The House That Guilt Built" | MacDonald | 1:22 |
| 2. | "Happy" | K. Whelan | 5:33 |
| 3. | "She Sends Kisses" | Bissell | 5:57 |
| 4. | "This Boy Is Exhausted" | Bissell | 4:17 |
| 5. | "Hopeless" | K. Whelan | 5:08 |
| 6. | "Faster Gun" | Bissell | 3:50 |
| 7. | "Thirteen Grand" | G. Whelan | 4:09 |
| 8. | "Boys, You Won't" | K. Whelan | 4:29 |
| 9. | "Ex-Girl Collection" | Bissell | 4:39 |
| 10. | "Per Second Second" | Bissell | 3:38 |
| 11. | "Everyone Choose Sides" | Bissell with K. Whelan | 4:39 |
| 12. | "13 Months in 6 Minutes" | Bissell | 6:50 |
| 13. | "This Is Not What You Had Planned" | K. Whelan | 1:37 |

=== US limited edition bonus tracks ===
| No. | Title | Length |
|---|---|---|
| 14. | "Splitter #7: Fireworks/James, I Wanna" | 3:13 |
| 15. | "Our Brightest New Year" | 4:20 |
| 16. | "Green Tides" | 1:23 |
| 17. | "Blue Lips" | 1:43 |

=== UK limited edition bonus tracks ===
| No. | Title | Length |
|---|---|---|
| 14. | "Such a Pretty Lie" | 3:59 |
| 15. | "Nervous and Not Me" | 2:05 |

== Release history ==
| Region | Date | Label | Format | Catalog |
|---|---|---|---|---|
| United States | September 9, 2003 | Absolutely Kosher | CD | AK009 |
| United States | unknown | Absolutely Kosher | CD with bonus tracks | AK009A |
| United Kingdom & Europe | September 19, 2005 | LO-MAX | CD | LOMAX018CD |
| United Kingdom | February 27, 2006 | LO-MAX | CD with bonus tracks | |
| Germany, Switzerland, Austria | September 19, 2005 | BB*Island | CD | BBI 0032 |
| Germany, Switzerland, Austria (also US Export) | January 2006 | BB*Island | 2LP Vinyl | BBI 0031 |
