= Emboldened Navigator =

EP by Frog Eyes
- Released: 2003
- Recorded: March 2001
- Studio: The People's Gymnasium
- Genre: Indie rock
- Length: 10:09
- Label: Soft Abuse

The Emboldened Navigator is an EP by Frog Eyes containing what is notable as the earliest recorded material from the band. The line-up is Carey Mercer, Melanie Campbell, Michael Rak and Spencer Krug. All four songs have been released as bonus tracks on the 2006 reissue of The Golden River, some under different titles. "World Featuring Men and Knuckles" as "Shots", "Only to Come Across Pleasant Meadows and Madames" as "Meadows and Madames and So Forth" (later re-done on Blackout Beach's Light Flows the Putrid Dawn as "Meadows and Pleasant Madames or Something of the Sort"), and "They Did Not Notice the Rushing Rapids" as "American Waltz for the Good Americans".

== Track listing ==
1. "World Featuring Men and Knuckles"
2. "I Hope My Horse Don't Make No Sound"
3. "Only to Come Across Pleasant Meadows and Madames"
4. "They Did Not Notice the Rushing Rapids"

== Personnel ==
Frog Eyes

- Carey Mercer – vocals, guitar, paintings
- Spencer Krug – keyboards
- Michael Rak – bass
- Melanie Campbell - drums

Production

- Calvin Dick – recording engineer
- Christine Boepple – photography
- Jerrod Landon Porter – layout
