= Paul's Tomb: A Triumph =

Studio album by Frog Eyes
- Released: April 27, 2010
- Genre: Indie
- Label: Dead Oceans
- Producer: Daryl Smith/Carey Mercer

Frog Eyes chronology
Tears of the Valedictorian (2007)	Paul's Tomb: A Triumph (2010)

Paul's Tomb: A Triumph is a 2010 album by Canadian indie rock band Frog Eyes. It was a longlisted nominee for the 2010 Polaris Music Prize.

== Critical reception ==
Professional ratings
Review scores
Source	Rating
AllMusic	4/5 stars
The A.V. Club	B+
Consequence of Sound	A+
NME	4/5 stars
Pitchfork	6.4/10
Tiny Mix Tapes	4/5 stars

PopMatters called the album "the band’s most cohesive and expansive LP." Drowned in Sound wrote that "this record is at its best when it is direct, when [Carey] Mercer spews out gargled lines like a fountain, when it all clicks just so." The Village Voice wrote that the album "pitches the band at their most prolific and their most accessible, thanks to frequent burn-down-the-bar mitzvah-organ solos and Mercer’s quavering death cries."

== Track listing ==
1. "A Flower in a Glove" – 9:08
2. "The Sensitive Girls" – 3:37
3. "Odetta's War" – 6:22
4. "Rebel Horns" – 4:22
5. "Lear, in the Park" 1:56
6. "Styled by Dr. Roberts" – 7:26
7. "Lear in Love" – 4:33
8. "Violent Psalms" – 3:59
9. "Paul's Tomb" – 8:01

== Personnel ==
Frog Eyes

- Carey Mercer – vocals, guitar
- Melanie Campbell – drums
- Ryan Beattie – guitar
- Megan Boddy – keyboards

Additional musician

- Mike Rak – bass (track 9)

Production

- Daryl Smith – recording and mixing (tracks 1–4, 6, 7, 9)
- Paul Gold – mastering
- Sergei Prokudin-Gotskii – photography
- Daniel Murphy – layout
