= The Durgas =

Rock band

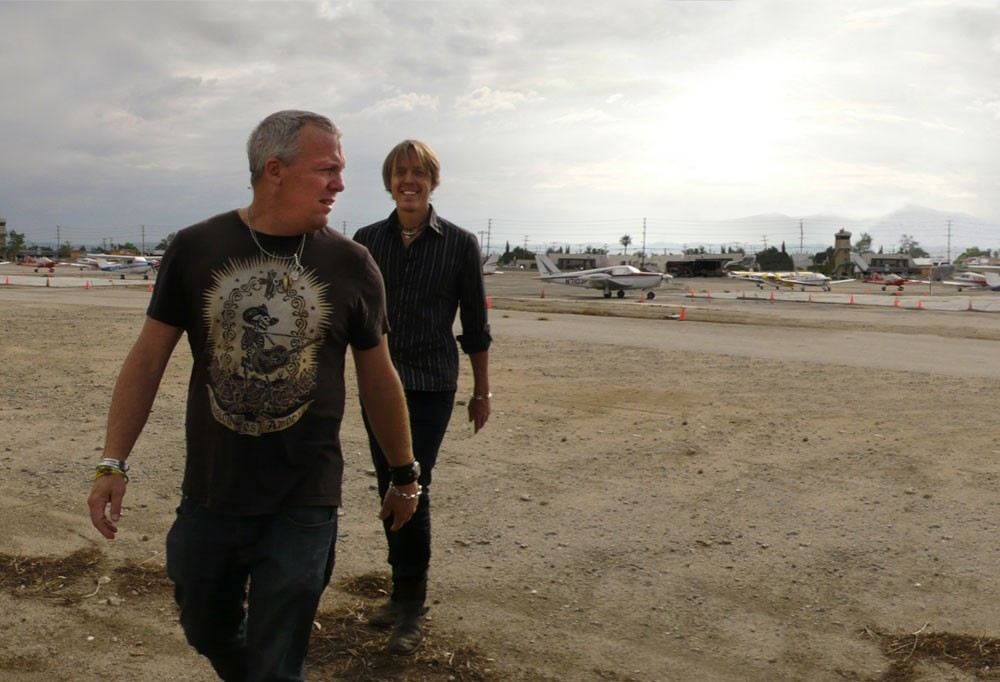
- Benjii and Christopher Simmersbach of The Durgas

Background information
- Origin: Los Angeles, Budapest, Hawaii
- Genres: Rock; African and Eastern European folk; Americana; reggae; blues; indie rock; folk and roots music
- Years active: 2004–present
- Label: Cannery Row Records
- Members: Benjii Simmersbach; Christopher Simmersbach; Katy J Arnovick; Török Gábor; Orlando Smith; Alexander Czerny; Murray Moceri; Patrick Simmersbach
- Website: www.thedurgas.com

The Durgas is a rock band founded in 2004 around the three brothers Benjii, Christopher, and Patrick Simmersbach, with influences of reggae and African and Eastern European folk elements over strains of Americana, folk and roots music and blues, without losing touch with the musicians' roots in punk and indie rock.

== Background ==
Benjii Simmersbach (vocals, guitar) and Christopher Simmersbach (lead guitar) draw much of their musical influence from their childhood; both were born in Bavaria, Germany but raised in various parts of Thailand, Switzerland, Portugal, Tanzania, Mali, Senegal, Italy, France and the United States, as seen in the documentary film The Big Pink (1994, ZDF/Arte, Grimme Award, 1996) on their hippie upbringing. The band's current main constellation consists of Török Gabor (Hungary) on drums, and Katy J Arnovick (United States) on bass and vocals. Often their live performances feature: Orlando Smith (Hawaii) on drums, Murray Moceri (Sri Lanka) on bass, and Benjii and Christopher's older brother, Patrick Simmersbach (Hawaii) on guitar. When not on tour, their homes are in Los Angeles, Budapest and Hawaii, respectively.

=== A Subtle Plague, 1984-1998 ===
Founded in 1984 in New York City, Adam Yauch of the Beastie Boys recorded A Subtle Plague's first demo. The brothers Simmersbach (with Benjii on bass and vocals and Christopher on percussion and guitar), Analucia DaSilva (vocals), Pat Ryan (vocals), third brother Patrick Simmersbach (guitar), changing drummers (including Earl Robertson, Vangie Bonds, Theo Denaxis, Sean Coffey, Tod Preuss and Magnus Fleischmann) and Jonathan Levy (percussion/saxophone) achieved wide notoriety as one of the best live bands in the U.S. underground, recording 7 albums, 3 singles and several compilations/split singles for various independent labels, including Rough Trade Records, Heyday Records, Grosse Rose Records, Harp Records and Trocadero Records. Continuous European Tours followed, with an average of 125 concerts a year. They shared the stage with musicians such as Iggy Pop, Lou Reed, Mudhoney, Vic Chesnutt, Chumbawamba, Sister Double Happiness, Noir Désir, H-Blockx, The Notwist, The Jesus Lizard, Sonic Youth and Soul Asylum. Their communal way of touring and devoted fans led to Germany's Rolling Stone magazine calling A Subtle Plague "the Grateful Dead of the '90s". The end of the millennium brought the end of A Subtle Plague and a change towards the sounds of the folk and roots music of their upbringing.

=== A Drastic Measure, 1998-2003 ===
After Pat Ryan and Analycia DaSilva left the band to pursue individual careers, Benjii switched to guitar and became the singer of A Drastic Measure. Magnus and Maurus Fleischmann of Assassins of God and The Hedonist joined on drums and bass, Jonathan Heine from Berlin joined the group on bass, Jonathan Levy re-joined as ambient sound master, and a string of changing drummers followed. A Drastic Measure recorded High Frequency Recalibration (1999, self-released) and Soul Of A Century (released by Thomas Bolenius in 2005) in San Francisco, engineered by Desmond Shea at Kevin Ink's The Studio That Time Forgot, produced by Fred Vidalenc (ex-bassist of Noir Désir) in Brittany, France. Among many guest musicians, the album features Michael Franti of Spearhead on vocals, Dan Carr of Preston School of Industry, The Court & Spark on bass, Tom Heyman of Go To Blazes and The Court and Spark on slide guitar, Mike Travers of Downhill Racers on keyboards, as well as Analucia DaSilva of A Subtle Plague on vocals. After Jonathan Levy moved to New York City and Patrick Simmersbach moved to settle in Hawaii, a Drastic Measure changed their name to The Durgas.

== Discography ==
=== Studio albums ===
In 2008, the Berlin label Cannery Row Records released The Durgas’ debut album Back To The Start, which was mixed by Boris Wilsdorf (producer of Einstürzende Neubauten), and featured guest musician Chuck Prophet.

The Durgas' album Burma was recorded in Berlin and self-released in 2010. Produced by Noa Winter Lazerus (The Rolling Stones, Tom Waits, Pink Floyd) in Los Angeles and featuring Jim Fairchild (Grandaddy, Modest Mouse) on two tracks, it signifies the group's most pop-oriented sound to date and alludes to the struggle of a nation in transition.

In early 2014, The Durgas self-released their self-produced album, Digging In The Fire.

=== Live albums ===
Durgas' live album Make Some Noise was recorded in Hawaii in 2009.

== Soundtracks ==
The Durgas' music has been featured on several film soundtracks, including Soul Of A Century (Premio EuroDoc award 2002 for best European documentary) and the documentary film Hotel Sahara. They scored and composed original music for Into the Current: Burma’s Political Prisoners, a documentary film by Jeanne Hallacy; the film was nominated at the 2012 Santa Barbara Human Rights Film Festival.

== Awards ==
The Durgas' song 'Send The Wind', on their record Digging In The Fire, was among the top 10 music finalists of the World Citizen Artist 2014 competition by World Citizen Artists along with Playing for Change Foundation, Belgravia Gallery and issuu, and The Durgas have been named Ethics Advisors and Ambassadors for World Citizen Artists.

== Commitment ==
=== Music In Aktion ===
Besides their extensive international tours, The Durgas are committed to bringing a unifying musical experience to challenged communities worldwide. In 2003, they were the first international band to play in Mitrovica, Kosovo, since the Balkan Wars, as part of the ongoing United Nations peace and reunification initiative. In 2004, they participated in the XV International AIDS/HIV Conference in Bangkok, Thailand and performed in AIDS hospitals and orphanages. In 2007, they played for children of migrant workers in Mumbai, India, in Sri Lanka to families displaced by the Tsunami, in Thailand at the Saphan Jai festival, and for Burmese refugees in camps along the Thai border. Having witnessed firsthand the positive effects that live music can bring about in people across barriers of culture and language, they have been crucial in founding the non-profit Music In Aktion, which U.S. Campaign for Burma has supported, along with the Save the Children, the German children's foundation WeltKinderLachen, human rights activist Jack Healey and Michael Franti of Spearhead.
