= Indy 500 (disambiguation) =

Indy 500 is a nickname for the Indianapolis 500, a famous automobile race at the Indianapolis Motor Speedway oval track, first held in 1911.

Indy 500 or Indianapolis 500 or variant, may also refer to:

== Games ==
- Indy 500, a 1968 racing electro-mechanical game by Kasco
- Indy 500 (1977 video game), Atari 2600 console game
- Indianapolis 500: The Simulation, or Indy 500 (informal name), a 1989 computer game from Electronic Arts
- Indy 500 (1995 video game), a Sega arcade video game
- Indianapolis 500 (pinball), a 1995 Bally-brand pinball arcade game from Midway

== Other uses ==
- Indy 500, a model of snowmobiles made by Polaris Industries
- "Indie 500", a song by The Wrens from their 1996 album Secaucus
- "Indy 500", a song by Binary Star from the album Masters of the Universe

== See also ==
- Indianapolis 500 Evolution, a 2009 console video game
- Indianapolis 500 Legends, a 2007 console video game
- Brickyard 400, a stockcar race held at the Indianapolis Motor Speedway on the superspeedway oval track
- Verizon 200 at the Brickyard, a stockcar race held on the roval road course at the Indianapolis Motor Speedway
- Indianapolis motorcycle Grand Prix, a motorcycle road course race held at the Indianapolis Motor Speedway roval
- Grand Prix of Indianapolis, an IndyCar road course race held at the Indianapolis Motor Speedway roval
- United States Grand Prix (2000–2007), a Formula One race held on the roval road course at the Indianapolis Motor Speedway
