= Accordion Solo! =

Studio album by Ten in the Swear Jar
- Released: 2005 (US)
- Recorded: 1999–2000
- Genres: Experimental rock, ska-punk, post-punk, lo-fi, garage rock
- Length: 76:20
- Labels: Asian Man (US); ASM-130
- Producer: Jamie Stewart

Ten in the Swear Jar chronology
Inside the Computer Are All of My Feelings (2000)	Accordion Solo! (2005)

Accordion Solo! is a 2005 album by Ten in the Swear Jar. It is the band's third release under that name, a complete discography derived from all their previous releases. It is released by Asian Man Records who described it as "A collection of live recordings, "field recordings" and studio tracks with complex lyrics, beautiful melodies, and diverse instrumentation." The live tracks are acknowledged to be of imperfect quality.

Jamie Stewart has re-used many lyrics from songs on Accordion Solo! in various Xiu Xiu songs.

AJJ covered "San Jose Fight Song" on their 2014 compilation Rompilation 2.0: The Digitizing.

== Track listing ==
1. "Malafuquana Espana" – 1:47
2. "Hot Karl" – 3:04
3. "San Jose Fight Song" – 4:20
4. "I Don't Play the Drumz" – 4:13
5. "Gauntlet of Thor the Destroyer" – 5:33
6. "Fort Awesome Drunk Tank" – 0:52
7. "Helsabot" – 3:21
8. "Famine" – 4:32
9. "I Love the Valley" – 3:39
10. "Leg Show" – 4:14
11. "King Earth" – 4:09
12. "Melon" – 0:48
13. "When You Write" – 3:58
14. "Worry Boy" – 3:54
15. "Sita Deth" – 3:31
16. "House Quake II" – 3:56
17. "Sad Girl" – 3:21
18. "In The Blue Trunks J.H." – 3:28
19. "Accordion Solo!" – 0:04
20. "Gauntlet of Thor the Destroyer (live)" – 5:41
21. "I Love the Valley (live)" – 3:21
22. "House Quake II (live)" – 4:23

=== Explanation of tracks ===
- 4, 6-8, 13-15, 17 are taken from the album My Very Private Map
- 3, 5, 9 are taken from the EP Inside The Computer Are All Of My Feelings
- 1, 2, 10-12, 16, 18 are taken from the unreleased album Eat Death Orphans!
- 20-22 are live recordings from The Usual in San Jose, California
- 1, 6, 12, 19 are field recordings
- 13 is a cover of the IBOPA (Indestructible Beat of Palo Alto) song of the same name (Stewart's previous band)

=== Re-usage of lyrics in Xiu Xiu songs ===
- Lyrics in "Hot Karl" and "House Quake II" are reused in "Pink City" from A Promise
- "Helsabot" was later sung by Caralee McElroy in "Helsabot of Caraleebot", a b-side to "Fleshettes", and "Helsabot", from Fag Patrol
- "I Love The Valley" would become "I Luv The Valley OH!" from Fabulous Muscles
- "King Earth" would become "King Earth, King Earth" from Chapel of the Chimes and Fag Patrol
- "Sad Girl" would become "Sad Pony Guerrilla Girl" from A Promise

== Reception ==
Professional ratings
Review scores
Source	Rating
Tiny Mix Tapes	4/5 stars
Pitchfork Media	(7.4/10)

Tiny Mix Tapes wrote, "Save the chirp 'n' croak of the unnecessary field recordings, Accordion Solo! presents a compelling alter ego to counteract the clucking of one of indie-rock's favorite chickens . . . [A] calculated, cocksure, and soiled like a bona fide dumpster mattress with all sorts of beautiful yellow, orange, and brown taint/mung stains."

Pitchfork Media wrote, "Accordion Solo! is the rare early-career document that works as a stand-alone record. One gets the sense that Stewart had yet to develop the confidence to be as melodramatic as [they'd] like, and Xiu Xiu detractors might find this preferable to the more realized recent work, while for neophytes, it will provide a valuable foothold on Stewart's daunting, alien terrain."
