= Observatory (disambiguation) =

An observatory is a location used for observing terrestrial or celestial events.

Observatory may also refer to:

- Observatory, Bristol, a building in Clifton, Bristol, England
- Observatory, Cape Town, suburb in Cape Town, South Africa
- Observatory, Gauteng, suburb in Johannesburg, South Africa
- Observatory (Steve Weingart & Renee Jones album), 2012 album by Steve Weingart & Renee Jones
- Observatory (Aeon Station album), 2021 album by Aeon Station
- Observatory (horse), thoroughbred race horse
- Ratcheugh Observatory, a folly in Northumberland, also known as The Observatory
- The Observatory (journal), an astronomy journal
- The Observatory (band), an art rock, experimental and electronica band based in Singapore
- The Observatory (album), an album by Cadet
- The Observatory, the name for the two Californian live music venues located in North Park, San Diego and Orange County.
- Public institutions dedicated to continuously monitoring statistics in a particular geographical area are sometimes called observatories:
  - The EU Tax Observatory
  - Public health observatory
