= Fabulous Muscles =

Studio album by Xiu Xiu
- Released: February 17, 2004
- Genres: Indie rock; post-rock; indie electronic; ambient pop; experimental; avant-garde
- Length: 37:40
- Label: 5 Rue Christine
- Producer: Cory McCulloch

Xiu Xiu chronology
Fag Patrol (2003)	Fabulous Muscles (2004)	Life and Live (2005)

Fabulous Muscles is the third studio album by American experimental band Xiu Xiu, released on February 17, 2004, on 5 Rue Christine. The album marked a change in the band's sound, described as a depressive mix between experimental rock and synth-pop. It is considered to be more accessible than Xiu Xiu's previous two studio albums, A Promise and Knife Play. Fabulous Muscles has received mostly positive reviews from critics.

== Overview ==
Fabulous Muscles was Xiu Xiu's third album in two years. The album was recorded in Oakland and Seattle and was produced by band member Cory McCulloch. The album's cover features band leader Jamie Stewart nuzzling a toy kitten.

Several reviewers found Fabulous Muscles to have a more accessible sound than Xiu Xiu's previous albums. On recording the album, Stewart said:

I think on Fabulous Muscles we really tried to write a pop record just because... We were on a lark and wanted to see how it would turn out.

Stewart attributed the title track to a tribute CD, The Ash Gray Proclamation, for author Dennis Cooper. They said that they would not have been able to write a song like that without having read Cooper's books, since Cooper helped Stewart "to feel ... that it was possible to be more open" due to his "frankness".

== Themes and lyrics ==
Fabulous Muscles is populated by dark themes, including depression, physical abuse, mental abuse, and drug addiction.

Jamie Stewart told Pitchfork that the tone of the album reflected the events of their personal life, which were "incredibly, incredibly violent, incredibly jarring and difficult to take... and personally and politically extreme in black and white ways". Their next studio album, The Air Force, reflects their experience internalizing the trauma of that period.

The album's title track was inspired by the Iceberg Slim novel Mama Black Widow and describes an abusive relationship between a muscle-worshiping Stewart and a hyper-masculine man. The song "Brian the Vampire" is based on a child Stewart encountered during their time as a preschool teacher in California. According to Stewart, "His whole family lived in one garage and his older brother ... was molesting Brian at night while the whole family was sleeping in the room." The penultimate "Clowne Towne" sees Stewart reflect on the current statuses of friends from their teens and young adulthood (such as Michael Hadreas of Perfume Genius or fellow Xiu Xiu member Caralee McElroy) and how they compare to their own. "Mike" is a tribute to Stewart's late father Michael Stewart, who committed suicide in 2002, while "Support Our Troops OH! (Black Angels OH!)" is about Stewart's distaste about soldiers serving in the Iraq War.

== Reception ==
Professional ratings
Aggregate scores
Source	Rating
Metacritic	80/100
Review scores
Source	Rating
AllMusic	4/5 stars
Alternative Press	4/5 stars
Cokemachineglow	68%
Mojo	3.5/5 stars
Pitchfork	9.0/10
Stylus	C
Tiny Mix Tapes	4/5 stars
URB	4/5 stars
The Village Voice	C

Fabulous Muscles received mostly positive reviews. On the review aggregate site Metacritic, the album has a score of 80 out of 100, indicating "Generally favorable reviews". Critics were generally receptive to the album's more accessible sound.

Heather Phares of AllMusic wrote that Fabulous Muscles "might be the best expression of Xiu Xiu's unrepentantly original music; even if the world that the band creates isn't necessarily one you'd want to visit all the time, it remains fascinating." Pitchfork's Matt LeMay also praised the album, writing, "Though there are many notable high points to Fabulous Muscles, its overwhelming consistency is what cements its place as Xiu Xiu's finest. The album does not contain a single hiccup or yawn-- no extraneous noise, no potentially offputting histrionics, no throwaways and no dull moments." The album also received a "Best New Music" designation in the review. Adrien Begrand of PopMatters praised it as "more focused and direct" than A Promise.

Robert Christgau of The Village Voice panned the album, writing, "The musical parsimony, cultural insularity, moral certitude, and histrionic affectations of these lo-fi artier-than-thous promise indie ideologues whole lifetimes of egoistic irrelevance." Stylus Magazine's Akiva Gottlieb wrote, "Obviously, Stewart has a penchant for self-examination—some of it brilliant and incisive—but [their] work is also obnoxiously self-indulgent."

Fabulous Muscles has appeared on a few end of year lists. The Morning News named it the 7th best album of 2004. Pitchfork Media ranked Fabulous Muscles No. 50 on their list of the top 50 albums of 2004. In addition, the same website ranked the song "I Luv the Valley OH!" No. 176 on their list of the Top 500 Tracks of the 2000s, with reviewer Brian Howe writing "A great Xiu Xiu song is like someone actually hurting himself, right in front of you. This ["I Luv the Valley OH!"] isn't their most violent effort, but it's their most scouring; a place where mortar-round drums pound down on rolling bass and chiming guitars, unsubtly conveying the painful insight that some dreams have to be razed, not realized." The album also placed 19th on Tiny Mix Tapes favorite albums of 2000-2009.

Brandon Stosuy of Pitchfork described the album as "brilliant" and a blend of "circus music and shattered death disco". In a review of Xiu Xiu's recent album Oh No, Brian Howe of Pitchfork described the title track as a "mini-masterpiece."

== Track listing ==
No.	Title	Length
1.	"Crank Heart"	3:19
2.	"I Luv the Valley OH!"	2:59
3.	"Bunny Gamer (b)"	2:40
4.	"Little Panda McElroy (b)"	4:25
5.	"Support Our Troops OH! (Black Angels OH!)"	4:46
6.	"Fabulous Muscles (Mama Black Widow Version)"	4:10
7.	"Brian the Vampire"	2:38
8.	"Nieces Pieces (Boat Knife Version)"	3:33
9.	"Clowne Towne"	3:50
10.	"Mike"	5:13
Total length:		37:40

== Personnel ==
The following people contributed to Fabulous Muscles:

=== Xiu Xiu ===
- Lauren Andrews - Synthesizer (2), Percussion (5)
- Jherek Bischoff - Bass (1/4), Guitar (2/5), Bass Drums (2), Violin (3), Upright Bass (5), String Arrangements (5), Synthesizer (5), Trombone (8)
- Cory McCulloch - Producer, Harmonium (5/8), Mandolin (1), Guitar (2), Bass Synthesizer (2)
- Sam Mickens - Guitar (1/2), Synthesizer (2), Percussion (2), String Arrangements (5)
- Jamie Stewart - Vocals, Guitar, Synthesizer (1/3/4/7/9/10), Beats (1/3/7), Bass (2), Percussion (9)

=== Additional personnel ===
- John Golden - Mastering
- Lorem Ipsum - Photography
- Caralee McElroy - Photography
- Gabriel Mindel - Electronics (5), Guitar (5), Synthesizer (5)
- Sprout Guy - Viola (5/9), Violin (5/9)
- Joe Stewart - Design
- Peter Swanson - Drum Machine (5), Electronics (5), Synthesizer (5)
