= Hot Karl (disambiguation) =

Hot Karl is an American rapper.

Hot Karl may also refer to:

- Hot Karl (slang), a sexual slang term for sex acts involving feces
- Hot Karl Row, nickname for buildings at 20, 30 & 50 Bayard Street in Williamsburg, Brooklyn, designed by Karl Fischer
- "Hot Karl", a song by Ten in the Swear Jar from Accordion Solo!, 2005
