= Secaucus (disambiguation) =

Secaucus, New Jersey is a town in Hudson County, New Jersey, USA.

Secaucus may also refer to:

- Secaucus Junction, a heavy train station owned and operated by New Jersey Transit
- Secaucus (album), a 1996 album by New Jersey band The Wrens

== See also ==
- Return of the Secaucus 7, a film
