= Chapel of the Chimes =

Chapel of the Chimes may refer to:

- Chapel of the Chimes (Oakland, California)
- Chapel of the Chimes (Hayward, California)
- Chapel of the Chimes (EP), 2002, by Xiu Xiu
