= Poor Moon (Hiss Golden Messenger album) =

Studio album by Hiss Golden Messenger
- Released: April 17, 2012
- Genre: Rock
- Length: 44:39
- Label: Tompkins Square

Hiss Golden Messenger chronology
| Bad Debt (2010) | Poor Moon (2012) | Haw (2013) |

Professional ratings
Aggregate scores
| Source | Rating |
|---|---|
| Metacritic | 80/100 |
Review scores
| Source | Rating |
| Consequence of Sound | C+ |

Poor Moon is the third studio album by American duo Hiss Golden Messenger. It was released in April 2012 under Tompkins Square Records, a remastered version with a new cover was released by Merge Records in 2018.

== Track list ==
| No. | Title | Length |
|---|---|---|
| 1. | "Blue Country Mystic" | 4:05 |
| 2. | "Call Him Daylight" | 3:28 |
| 3. | "Drummer Down" | 2:47 |
| 4. | "Under All the Land" | 3:46 |
| 5. | "Westering" | 4:18 |
| 6. | "Pittsboro Farewell (Two Monarchs)" | 2:46 |
| 7. | "Super Blue (Two Days Clean)" | 4:31 |
| 8. | "Jesus Shot Me in the Head" | 5:05 |
| 9. | "O Little Light" | 2:59 |
| 10. | "A Working Man Can't Make It No Way" | 3:46 |
| 11. | "Dreamwood" | 3:25 |
| 12. | "Balthazar's Song" | 3:43 |
