= Bad Debt (album) =

Studio album by Hiss Golden Messenger
- Released: November 22, 2010; January 14, 2014 (Reissue); November 2, 2018 (Reissue)
- Genre: Country
- Length: 34:15 (2010 Release); 42:34 (2014 Release)
- Labels: Black Maps; Paradise of Bachelors; Merge Records

Hiss Golden Messenger chronology
Country Hai East Cotton (2009)	Bad Debt (2010)	Poor Moon (2012)

Professional ratings
Aggregate scores
Source	Rating
Metacritic	81/100
Review scores
Source	Rating
Allmusic	4/5 stars
Paste Magazine	8.6/10
Slant Magazine	4/5 stars

Bad Debt is a studio album by American musician Hiss Golden Messenger. It was released in November 2010 under Black Maps Records, then reissued in January 2014 under Paradise of Bachelors with three new tracks. It was later remastered and reissued in 2018 by Merge Records with an alternative cover.

== Track listing ==
No.	Title	Length
1.	"Balthazar's Song"	3:24
2.	"No Lord is Free"	5:06
3.	"Bad Debt"	2:59
4.	"O Little Light"	4:16
5.	"Straw Man Red Sun River Gold"	4:01
6.	"The Serpent Is Kind (Compared To Man)"	3:36
7.	"Jesus Shot Me in the Head"	5:17
8.	"Super Blue (Two Days Clean)"	3:08
9.	"Drum"	2:28

2014 Reissue
No.	Title	Length
1.	"Balthazar's Song"	3:24
2.	"No Lord is Free"	5:06
3.	"Bad Debt"	2:59
4.	"O Little Light"	4:16
5.	"Straw Man Red Sun River Gold"	4:01
6.	"Far Bright Star"	2:01
7.	"The Serpent Is Kind (Compared To Man)"	3:36
8.	"Call Him Daylight"	3:26
9.	"Jesus Shot Me in the Head"	5:15
10.	"Super Blue (Two Days Clean)"	3:05
11.	"Roll River Roll"	3:17
12.	"Drum"	2:28
