= Eltro =

American indie rock band

- Origin: Philadelphia
- Genres: Indie rock
- Years active: 1995-2003
- Labels: Absolutely Kosher Records
- Past members: Diana Prescott, Jorge Sandrini, Rick Henderson, Ted Johnson

Eltro was an American indie rock band from Philadelphia, founded in 1995. The group released three albums for Absolutely Kosher Records in the late 1990s and early 2000s.

== Members ==
- Diana Prescott - vocals, bass, guitar, comb, found sound
- Jorge Sandrini - guitars, bass, MPC2000, vocals
- Rick Henderson - keyboards, trumpet, vocals, harmonica
- Ted Johnson - drums, percussion, vocals

== Discography ==
- Information Changer (Miner Street, 1998; Absolutely Kosher, 2001)
- Velodrome (Absolutely Kosher, 2001)
- Past and Present Futurists (Absolutely Kosher, 2003)
