= Swan Lake (band) =

Canadian indie supergroup

- Origin: Canada
- Genres: Indie rock, folk, experimental
- Years active: 2006–2009
- Label: Jagjaguwar
- Past members: Spencer Krug; Carey Mercer; Dan Bejar
- Website: jagjaguwar.com/artist/swanlake/

Swan Lake was a Canadian indie supergroup comprising Carey Mercer of Frog Eyes and Blackout Beach; Dan Bejar of Destroyer, Hello, Blue Roses, and The New Pornographers; and Spencer Krug of Wolf Parade, Sunset Rubdown and Frog Eyes.

== History ==
The group originally performed under the moniker "Thunder Cloud"; after discovering another band with that name, they changed to Swan Lake.

The band released their debut album Beast Moans in November 2006 through Jagjaguwar. The album was named by Mercer after Krug described the sound as "a boar dying in a tar pit", and featured a cover design by Daniel Murphy.

Enemy Mine, the second album from Swan Lake, was released in March 2009. The nine-song album was recorded in Victoria, British Columbia in early 2008. The band claimed it took a more focused effort on collaborative song writing on Enemy Mine, instead of the avant-garde mash of styles heard on Beast Moans.

== Members ==
- Spencer Krug: Keyboard, Guitar, Vocals
- Carey Mercer: Guitar, Vocals
- Dan Bejar: Guitar, Vocals

== Discography ==
- Beast Moans (2006), Jagjaguwar
- Enemy Mine (2009), Jagjaguwar
