= Enemy Mine (album) =

Studio album by Swan Lake
- Released: March 24, 2009
- Genre: Indie rock
- Length: 39:08
- Label: Jagjaguwar

Swan Lake chronology
Beast Moans (2006)	Enemy Mine (2009)

Professional ratings
Aggregate scores
Source	Rating
Metacritic	72/100
Review scores
Source	Rating
AllMusic	3.5/5 stars
Pitchfork Media	7.4/10

Enemy Mine is the second and final studio album by Canadian indie rock supergroup Swan Lake, released on March 24, 2009 on the label Jagjaguwar.

== Track listing ==
All songwriting credited to Daniel Bejar, Spencer Krug, and Carey Mercer, except "Paper Lace" credited to Bejar, Michael Doerksen, Camilla Wynne Ingr, Krug, Mercer, Mark Nicol, and Jordan Robson-Cramer

1. "Spanish Gold, 2044" (Mercer) – 5:15
2. "Paper Lace" (Krug) – 3:44
3. "Heartswarm" (Bejar) – 4:35
4. "Settle on Your Skin" (Krug) – 2:59
5. "Ballad of a Swan Lake, Or, Daniel’s Song" (Bejar) – 3:41
6. "Peace" (Mercer) – 4:08
7. "Spider" (Bejar) – 2:44
8. "A Hand at Dusk" (Krug) – 6:07
9. "Warlock Psychologist" (Mercer) – 5:57

== Personnel ==
Swan Lake

- Daniel Bejar – performer, recording
- Spencer Krug – performer, recording
- Carey Mercer – performer, recording

Production

- John Congleton – mixing
- Reg Lech – artwork
- Chris Frey – back cover photograph
