= Silver (The Wrens album) =

Studio album by the Wrens
- Released: 1994
- Genre: Indie rock; alternative rock
- Length: 68:51
- Label: Grass

The Wrens chronology
Silver (1994)	Secaucus (1996)

Silver is the debut studio album by the alternative rock band the Wrens, released in 1994.

== Critical reception ==
Professional ratings
Review scores
Source	Rating
AllMusic	3/5 stars
The Encyclopedia of Popular Music	3/5 stars
Pitchfork	7.1/10

Trouser Press wrote: "Frenetic guitar stylings in classic post-punk slapdash mode underpin most of the tracks; bassist Kevin Whelan, guitarists Greg Whelan and Charles Bissell and drummer Jerry MacDonnell take turns singing lead; the predominantly strained, nasal vocals render a lot of the lyrics indiscernible but lend a heartfelt charm." The Morning Call wrote that the album shows "a musical depth unusual for a debut that has echoes of the Jam, XTC, the Cure and the Pixies."

== Track listing ==
No.	Title	Length
1.	"Propane"	1:21
2.	"Napiers"	3:12
3.	"From His Lips"	3:32
4.	"What's a Girl"	5:08
5.	"Darlin' Darlin'"	3:18
6.	"6"	2:25
7.	"Leather Side"	2:20
8.	"Fuzz"	0:27
9.	"Strange as Family"	4:15
10.	"Kevin's Hell"	1:25
11.	"Minion"	2:12
12.	"Crawling"	2:43
13.	"Ruth/Learned in Space"	5:56
14.	"William"	2:16
15.	"Behold Me"	2:27
16.	"Down to the Service"	1:48
17.	"Dakota"	3:09
18.	"Adanoi"	2:10
19.	"Me, the Misser, the Late"	4:06
20.	"Dust"	1:55
21.	"Grey Complexion"	2:35
22.	"Strengthless"	7:31
23.	"Decided Girl/Broken"	2:40
Total length:		68:51
