= Bottom of the Hudson =

American indie band

Bottom of the Hudson is an indie band from Brooklyn, New York. They are signed with Absolutely Kosher Records and debuted in 2003 with their album The Omaha Record. They later came out with Holiday Machine in 2005. On July 17, 2007, their latest album, Fantastic Hawk, was released. Band members include Eli Simon, sing/songwriter, Chris Coello, drums, and Michael Prince, guitar/keyboard. The late Trevor Butler, former bassist, was killed in an accident in July 2007. Eli Simon originally began the band by himself producing songs in his bedroom and later recruited the rest of the crew.

== Van accident ==
On July 29, 2007, bassist Trevor Butler was killed when the tour van for the band crashed and rolled over several times in Clinton, North Carolina after a tire blew. The drummer, Greg Lytle, was, at one point, in a critical condition due to a skull injury from the crash, but is now reported to be doing well.

== Discography ==
- The Omaha Record (2003)
- Holiday Machine (2005)
- Fantastic Hawk (2007)
