= A Promise (Xiu Xiu album) =

- Original cover art. The man's genitalia is covered with an orange rectangle on censored versions of the cover. The censored cover is used on digital versions and CDs of the album.

Studio album by Xiu Xiu
- Released: February 18, 2003
- Genres: Experimental; electronic
- Length: 38:54
- Label: 5 Rue Christine

Xiu Xiu chronology
Chapel of the Chimes (2002)	A Promise (2003)	Fag Patrol (2003)

A Promise is the second studio album by American experimental band Xiu Xiu, released on February 18, 2003 by 5 Rue Christine.

== Overview ==
The track "Sad Pony Guerrilla Girl" is a reworking of a song by Jamie Stewart's previous band Ten In The Swear Jar (XITSJ), called just "Sad Girl", which first appeared on their 1999 album My Very Private Map. "Pink City" also has its roots in a two-part song from XITSJ's unreleased album Eat Death Orphans!, which was eventually published in 2005's Accordion Solo! as "Hot Karl".

The album includes a stripped-down cover of Tracy Chapman's "Fast Car", of which Stewart said "That song really, very, very, very directly shaped how I wanted to write lyrics or what I wanted songs to be about...I wanted them to turn out in so far as the song very specifically narrates some particular horrible things that happen to somebody and there's no positive resolution in the end at all."

Referring to the closing track, "Ian Curtis Wishlist", Stewart explained that "an Ian Curtis wish list is a list of things that you have convinced yourself that you want to have happen, but you know that are never going to happen."

== Cover art ==
The cover art shows "a nude man kneeling on a bed and holding an upside-down baby doll". The photograph was taken by Xiu Xiu frontperson Jamie Stewart, who met the photo's subject, a prostitute, at a gay cruising spot in Hanoi, Vietnam, and paid the man to take photos with the baby. The original release was printed with an orange rectangle covering the man's penis, as the distributor told the band that only a tenth of the stores would carry the album without the censor. The rectangle censor was based on Todd Solondz's Storytelling, and Stewart was fine with it since "the point of the photo was him and not his dick". The vinyl reissue went uncensored, and the label (Absolutely Kosher) threatened to take their business elsewhere if the manufacturer did not want to print the cover.

== Reception ==
Professional ratings
Review scores
Source	Rating
AllMusic	4/5 stars
Pitchfork	8.6/10
Stylus	B
Tiny Mix Tapes	4/5 stars

Brandon Stosuy of Pitchfork wrote that Stewart "came into [their] own" on A Promise.

== Track listing ==
All tracks are written by Jamie Stewart, except as noted.

No.	Title	Writer(s)	Length
1.	"Sad Pony Guerrilla Girl"		3:18
2.	"Apistat Commander"		4:35
3.	"Walnut House"		4:41
4.	"20,000 Deaths for Eidelyn Gonzales, 20,000 Deaths for Jamie Peterson"		3:16
5.	"Pink City"		2:13
6.	"Sad Redux-O-Grapher"		3:19
7.	"Blacks"		3:14
8.	"Brooklyn Dodgers"		3:51
9.	"Fast Car"	Tracy Chapman	5:53
10.	"Ian Curtis Wishlist"		4:33
Total length:			38:54

== Personnel ==
=== Xiu Xiu ===
- Jamie Stewart
- Lauren Andrews
- Ches Smith
- Yvonne Chen
- Tally Jones

=== Additional personnel ===
- Cory McCulloch
- Aaron Russell
- Wei Hwu
- Sara Chaney
- Jherek Bischoff
- Korum Bischoff
- Sam Mickens
- John Golden - Mastering
