= Ryan Beattie =

Canadian musician

- Origin: Canada
- Genres: Indie rock
- Labels: Self Righteous Records, Absolutely Kosher
- Website: selfrighteous.ca/himalayanbear.html

Ryan Beattie is a Canadian musician best known for his work as guitarist of the indie rock band Frog Eyes. Beattie had joined the band to replace keyboardist Spencer Krug, who declined to tour with them, and has since become a full-fledged member.

He is also the frontman of the Vancouver Island-based Chet, and has also released multiple solo albums as Himalayan Bear.
