= Beast Moans =

Studio album by Swan Lake
- Released: November 21, 2006
- Recorded: February 2006
- Genre: Indie rock
- Length: 48:35
- Label: Jagjaguwar
- Producer: Swan Lake

Swan Lake chronology
Beast Moans (2006)	Enemy Mine (2009)

Professional ratings
Aggregate scores
Source	Rating
Metacritic	66/100
Review scores
Source	Rating
Allmusic	3.5/5 stars
Pitchfork Media	8.1/10

Beast Moans is the debut album by Canadian indie rock supergroup Swan Lake, released in November 2006 on the label Jagjaguwar. It was recorded at Dead Wood Studios in Shawnigan Lake, British Columbia as well as at a house in Victoria, British Columbia.

== Track listing ==
All songs credited to Daniel Bejar, Spencer Krug, and Carey Mercer.

1. "Widow's Walk" (Bejar) – 3:40
2. "Nubile Days" (Krug) – 2:10
3. "City Calls" (Mercer) – 4:45
4. "A Venue Called Rubella" (Bejar) – 4:20
5. "All Fires" (Krug) – 3:14
6. "The Partisan But He's Got to Know" (Mercer) – 4:40
7. "The Freedom" (Bejar) – 3:00
8. "Petersburg, Liberty Theater, 1914" (^{†}) – 3:32
9. "The Pollenated Girls" (Mercer) – 3:10
10. "Bluebird" (Krug) – 3:10
11. "Pleasure Vessels" (Mercer) – 2:19
12. "Are You Swimming in Her Pools?" (Krug) – 4:20
13. "Shooting Rockets" (Bejar) – 6:20
- † The writer of "Petersburg, Liberty Theater, 1914" is currently unknown.

== Personnel ==
Swan Lake

- Daniel Bejar – performer, recording, mixing
- Spencer Krug – performer, recording, mixing
- Carey Mercer – performer, recording, mixing

Production

- Colin Stewart – additional recording, additional mixing
- Harris Newman – mastering
- Shary Boyle – artwork
- Rafael Goldchain – photography
- Daniel Murphy – type, design
- Darius Van Armen – type, design
