= Lateness of Dancers =

Studio album by Hiss Golden Messenger
- Released: September 9, 2014
- Length: 42:48
- Label: Merge Records

Hiss Golden Messenger chronology
Haw (2013)	Lateness of Dancers (2014)	Heart Like a Levee (2016)

Singles from Lateness of Dancers
- 1. "Southern Grammar" Released: February 3, 2015

Professional ratings
Aggregate scores
Source	Rating
AnyDecentMusic?	7.6/10
Metacritic	81/100
Review scores
Source	Rating
AllMusic	4/5 stars
American Songwriter	4/5 stars
Classic Rock	4/5 stars
Consequence of Sound	A−
Drowned in Sound	7/10
Mojo	4/5 stars
musicOMH	4/5 stars
NME	9/10
Pitchfork	7.6/10
Record Collector	5/5 stars

Lateness of Dancers is the fifth studio album by American band Hiss Golden Messenger. It was released on September 9, 2014, under Merge Records.

== Critical reception ==
Lateness of Dancers was met with universal acclaim reviews from critics. At Metacritic, which assigns a weighted average rating out of 100 to reviews from mainstream publications, this release received an average score of 81, based on 16 reviews.

=== Accolades ===
Accolades for Lateness of Dancers
Publication	Accolade	Rank	Ref.
American Songwriter	Top 50 Albums of 2014	8	
Consequence of Sound	Top 50 Albums of 2014	23	
PopMatters	Top 80 Albums of 2014	57	
Uncut	Top 75 Albums of 2014	7	

== Track listing ==
Lateness of Dancers track listing
No.	Title	Length
1.	"Lucia"	3:11
2.	"Saturday's Song"	4:35
3.	"Mahogany Dread"	4:06
4.	"Day O Day (A Love So Free)"	5:30
5.	"Lateness of Dancers"	5:20
6.	"I'm a Raven (Shake Children)"	2:50
7.	"Black Dog Wind (Rose of Roses)"	4:30
8.	"Southern Grammar"	4:52
9.	"Chapter & Verse (Ione's Song)"	4:47
10.	"Drum"	3:07

== Personnel ==
- MC Taylor - lead vocals, guitars, production
- Scott Hirsch - bass guitar, pedal steel, mandolin, mixing, production
- Phil Cook - guitars, banjo, piano, organ, electric piano, background vocals
- Brad Cook - bass guitar, background vocals
- Matt McCaughan - drums, percussion
- Chris Boerner - guitars
- Terry Lonergan - drums, percussion
- William Tyler - guitars
- Alexandra Sauser-Monnig - background vocals
- Bobby Britt - fiddle
- Mark Paulson - strings

== Charts ==
Chart performance for Lateness of Dancers
Chart	Peak position
US Americana/Folk Albums (Billboard)	13
US Heatseekers Albums (Billboard)	22
