= Hiss Golden Messenger =

American folk band

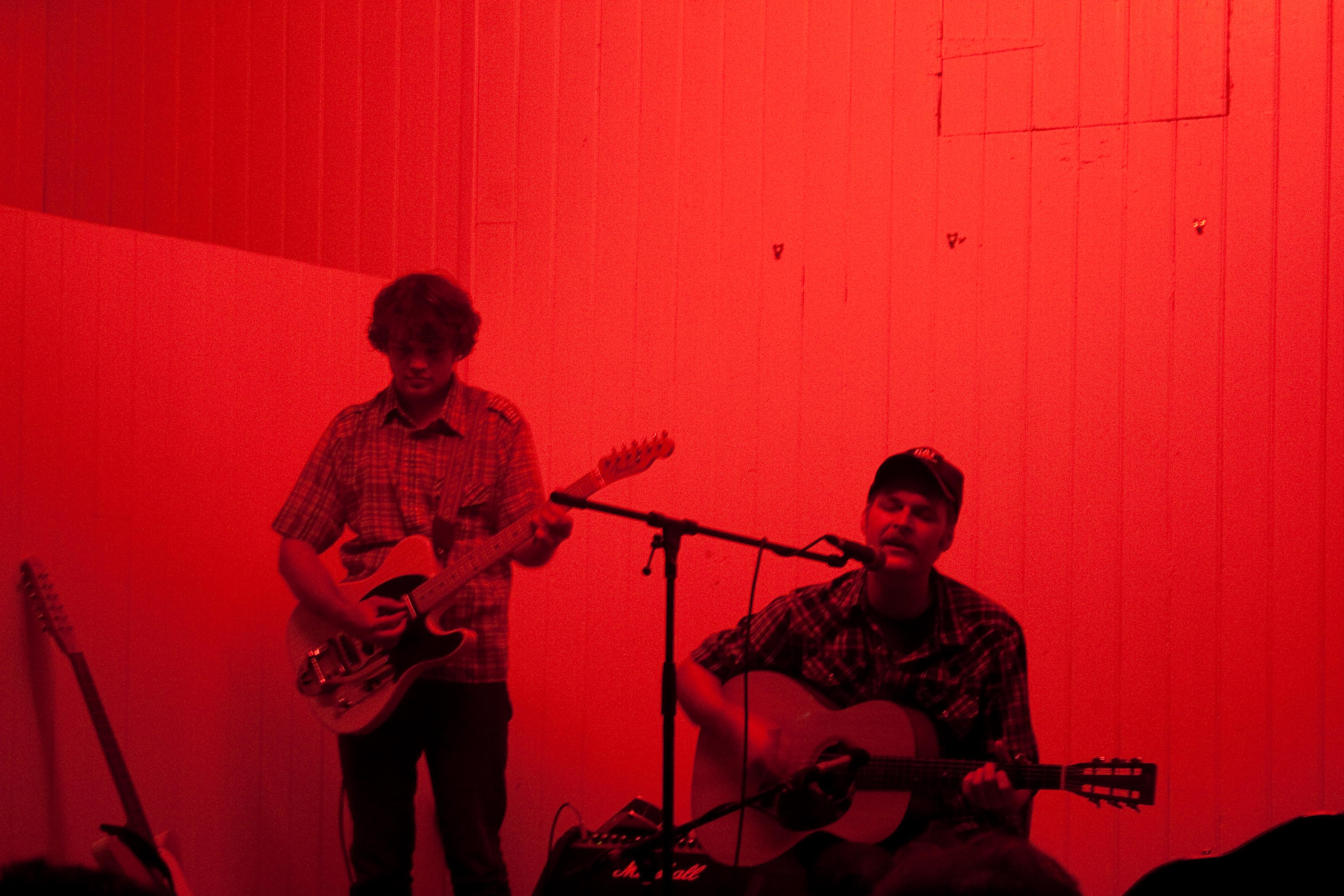
- Hiss Golden Messenger live in 2011

Background information
- Origin: Durham, North Carolina, U.S.
- Genres: Indie folk, blues, alternative country, country rock
- Years active: 2007–present
- Labels: Paradise of Bachelors, Heaven & Earth Magic, Blackmaps, Merge, Three Lobed Recordings, Chrysalis Records
- Members: M.C. Taylor

Hiss Golden Messenger is an American folk band originating from Durham, North Carolina, formed in 2007 and led by singer and songwriter M.C. Taylor.

== History ==
The band was formed by Michael Carrington "M.C." Taylor and Scott Hirsch, following the dissolution of their previous band, the alternative country group The Court and Spark. Hiss Golden Messenger's early recordings were released through Taylor's own label, "Heaven & Earth Magic Recording Company."

The band's debut album, Country Hai East Cotton, was released in 2009 via Taylor's label in a limited edition of 500. This was followed by their international debut album, Bad Debt, in 2010, released via Black Maps. The band's third album, Poor Moon, was released in 2012 via North Carolina–based "Paradise of Bachelors", and received positive reviews. The band's fourth album, Haw, was released on April 2, 2013.

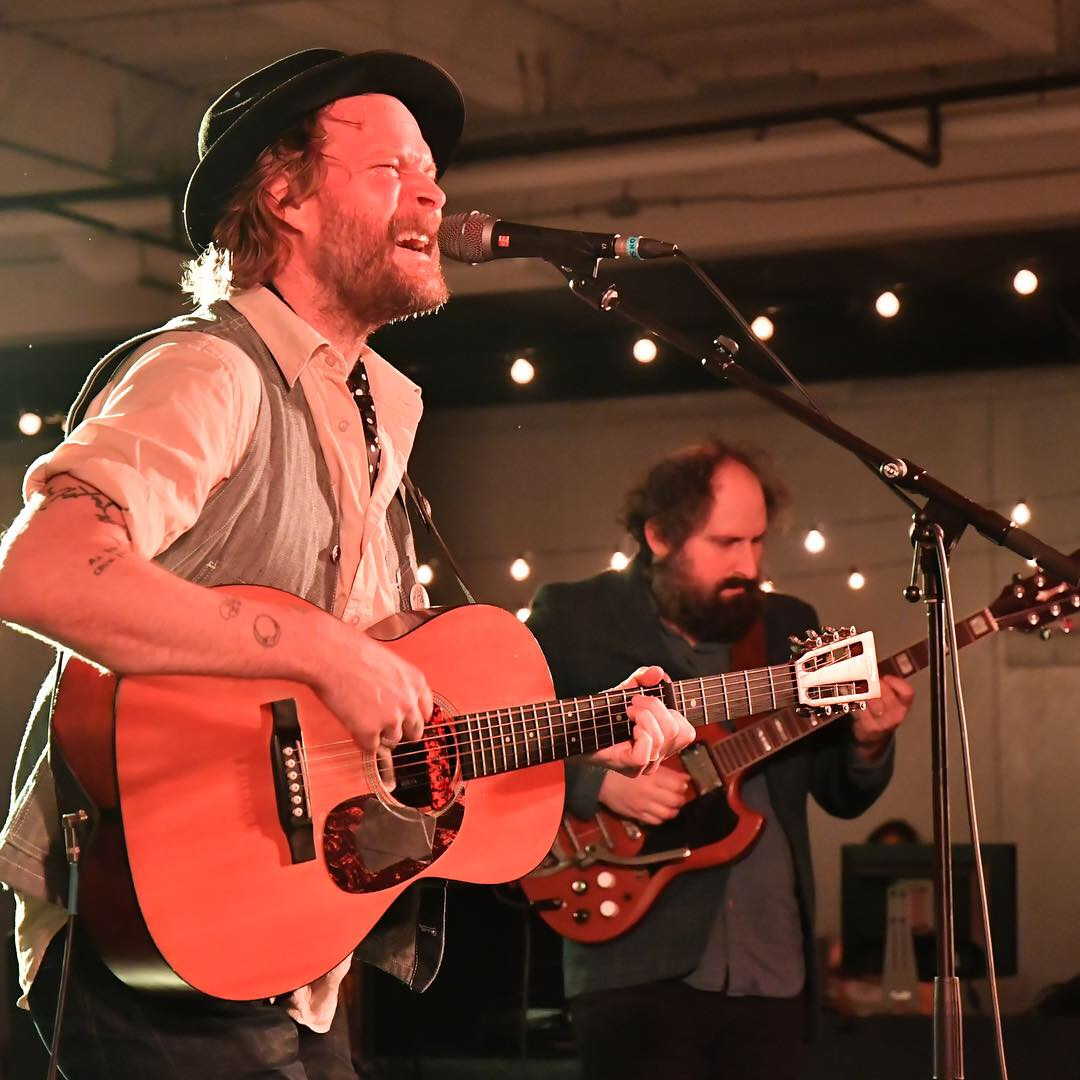
Hiss Golden Messenger performing live in December, 2018.

Hiss Golden Messenger was signed to Merge in April 2014 and released their fifth album and Merge label debut, Lateness of Dancers on September 9, 2014. They have gone on to release four additional full-length records via Merge, as well as remastered versions of Bad Debt, Poor Moon, and Haw.

Their 2019 album Terms of Surrender received a nomination for Best Americana Album at the 63rd Annual Grammy Awards.

In July 2021, the band participated in the Newport Folk Festival.

== Musical style ==
The band's music contains elements from various musical genres, such as folk, country, dub, country soul, rhythm and blues, bluegrass, jazz, funk, swamp pop, gospel, blues, and rock. The band's style was also described as "alternative country" and "country rock." The band's main influences include the Beatles, The Byrds, and Buffalo Springfield. The band has been compared to Will Oldham and Bill Callahan.

== Band members ==
Taylor has utilized a rotating cast of musicians for live shows.

Current touring members

- Chris Boerner (electric guitar)
- Matt Booth (bass guitar)
- Rhett Huffman (keyboards)
- Matt McCaughan (drums)
- M.C. Taylor (acoustic guitar, electric guitar)

Former touring members

- JT Bates (drums)
- Alex Bingham (bass guitar)
- Brad Cook (bass guitar)
- Phil Cook (guitar, keys)
- Nick Falk (drums)
- Sam Fribush (keys)
- Ryan Gustafson (guitar, banjo, mandolin)
- Scott Hirsch (bass guitar)
- Darren Jessee (drums)
- Josh Kaufman (guitar)
- Michael Libramento (bass guitar)
- Cameron Ralston (bass guitar)
- Al Smith (drums)
- William Tyler (guitar)

== Discography ==
=== Studio albums ===
- Country Hai East Cotton (2008, Heaven & Earth Magic Recording Company)
- Bad Debt (2010, Blackmaps)
- Poor Moon (2011, Paradise of Bachelors)
- Lord I Love the Rain (2012, Heaven and Earth Magic Recording Company)
- Haw (2013, Paradise of Bachelors)
- Lateness of Dancers (2014, Merge)
- Heart Like a Levee (2016, Merge)
- Vestapol (2016, Merge)
- Hallelujah Anyhow (2017, Merge)
- Virgo Fool (2018, Merge)
- Terms of Surrender (2019, Merge)
- Quietly Blowing It (2021, Merge)
- O Come All Ye Faithful (2021, Merge)
- The Sounding Joy: Hiss Golden Messenger Meets Revelators on South Robinson Street (2021, self-released)
- Jump for Joy (2023, Merge)
- I'm People (2026, Chrysalis)

=== EPs ===
- Glad (2013, self-released)
- Southern Grammar (2015, Merge)
- Lagniappe Sessions – Hiss Golden Messenger (2017, Aquarium Drunkard)

=== Live albums ===
- 042207 - Live in Big Sur (2008, Heaven & Earth Recording Company)
- Root Work – Live WFMU 2009 (2010, Heaven & Earth Recording Company)
- Plowed: Live in Bovina (2011, Heaven & Earth Magic Recording Company)
- London Exodus (2013, self-released)
- Parker's Picks Vol. 1: Live at Parish, Austin, TX 10/18/2016 (2017, self-released)
- Forward, Children: A Fundraiser for Durham Public Schools Students (2020, self-released)
- School Daze: A Fundraiser for Durham Public Schools Students (2020, self-released)
- Live in Leeds at the Brudenell Social Club 12/12/19 (2021, Merge Records)
- Wise Eyes: Live at The Neptune, Seattle, WA, 2/25/22 (2022, self-released)
- Greetings From Charleston! (2022, self-released)
- Mystic What: Live in Kansas City and St. Louis (2022, self-released)
- Troupe of Very Remarkable Trained Pigs: Live in Walla Walla, WA, February 26, 2022 (2022, self-released)
- A Midsummer Night's Dream: Live at EartH Hackney, June 15, 2022 (2023, self-released)

=== Singles ===
- "Hiss Golden Messenger Plays Elephant Micah Plays Hiss Golden Messenger", split with Elephant Micah (2012, Paradise of Bachelors)
- "Yankee Road"/"Shiloh Town", split with Moviola (2012, Pale Rider)
- "Jesus Shot Me In The Head" (2012, Tompkins Square)
- "Every Knee Shall Bow" (2013 on We Are Not For Sale: Songs of Protest by the NC Music Love Army via Redeye Distribution)
- "Brother, Do You Know The Road?" (2014, Merge)
- "Rock Holy" (2014, Merge from Or Thousands of Prizes, October)
- "The Beast and Dragon, Adored" (2014, Merge cover of Spoon song from Or Thousands of Prizes Cover EP, Google Play exclusive digital single)
- "Bad Debt" Live At Luna Records (2017, Luna Records)
- "Standing In The Doorway" (2017, self released)
- "Passing Clouds from Hiss Golden Messenger Meets Spacebomb" (2018, Spacebomb Records)
- "Domino (Time Will Tell)" (2019, Merge) #40 US AAA
- "Everybody Needs Somebody" b/w "Watching The Wires" (2019, Merge)
- "I Need A Teacher" (2019, Merge) #29 US AAA
- "Let The Light Of The World Open Your Eyes (Alive at Spacebomb Studios)" (2020, Spacebomb Records)
- "Sanctuary" (2020, Merge) #12 US AAA
- "Hardlytown" (2021, Merge)
- "Glory Strums (Loneliness Of The Long-Distance Runner)" (2021, Merge)

=== Miscellaneous ===
- Jesus Christ (2011, Heaven & Earth Magic Recording Company)
- Golden Gunn (2013, Three Lobed Recordings – Hiss Golden Messenger & Steve Gunn)
- Parallelogram (2015, Three Lobed Recordings -–Hiss Golden Messenger / Michael Chapman split)
- "Brown-Eyed Women" written by Jerry Garcia and Robert Hunter, for the 2016 Grateful Dead compilation album Day of the Dead
