= The Folded Palm =

Studio album by Frog Eyes
- Released: September 14, 2004
- Genre: Indie rock
- Length: 34:16
- Label: Absolutely Kosher

Frog Eyes chronology
| Ego Scriptor (2004) | The Folded Palm (2004) | The Future Is Inter-Disciplinary or Not at All (2006) |

Professional ratings
Review scores
| Source | Rating |
|---|---|
| AllMusic | 4/5 stars |
| Cokemachineglow | 85% |
| Pitchfork Media | 7.5/10 |
| PopMatters | (mixed) |
| Stylus Magazine | C+ |

The Folded Palm is the third album by Frog Eyes, released on September 14, 2004, on Absolutely Kosher Records.

== Track listing ==
1. "The Fence Feels its Post" - 1:39
2. "The Akhian Press" - 1:42
3. "I Like Dot Dot Dot" - 1:10
4. "Bells in the Crooked Port" - 2:27
5. "New Soft Motherhood Alliance" - 3:01
6. "Ship Destroyer" - 1:19
7. "The Heart That Felt Its Light" - 2:28
8. "The Oscillator's Hum" - 2:28
9. "Important Signals Will Break the Darkness (this I hope)" - 2:28
10. "New Tappy is Heard and Beheld" - 3:22
11. "Ice on the Trail" - 5:42
12. "A Library Used to Be (black hole and its concentrated edges)" - 2:19
13. "Russian Berries but You're Quiet Tonight" - 3:54
