= P.E.E. =

American math rock band

- Also known as: Pee (1993-1998); Potentially Egregious Error
- Genres: Math rock; indie rock; noise pop
- Years active: 1993-1999; 2009-10; 2025-present
- Labels: Bingo; Double-Play; March; Honey Bear; Absolutely Kosher; Deathbomb Arc
- Spinoffs: ImPeRiLs
- Members: Andee Connors; Jim Stanley; Kelly Green; Tiber Scheer
- Past members: Jason Mitchell; Bob Albert
- Website: peemusic.bandcamp.com

P.E.E., occasionally short for Potentially Egregious Error and also known as Pee, is a math rock band from San Francisco, California. Originally active from 1993 to 1999, they released two albums, Now, More Charm and More Tender in 1996 and The Roaring Mechanism in 1999. The band disbanded after guitarist/vocalist Jim Stanley and guitarist/co-vocalist Kelly Green, who were dating during the band's original duration, broke up. In 2025, the band announced "brand new action" in 2026, playing shows together for the first time since 2010.

== History ==
In 1993, Jim Stanley and Kelly Green, both guitarists and vocalists, formed a then-untitled group. Prior to their first performance, the duo realized that the group did not have a name. They ultimately decided on the name "Pee" spontaneously. The two later recruited Andee Connors of J Church and A Minor Forest to play drums. Bob Albert played bass guitar from the band's inception through the summer of 1996, when Bob left the band and Tiber Scheer of Lowercase joined on bass. This formation would stay the same throughout the rest of the band's time together in the 1990s and has remained the same since.

The band played with several rock bands in the California area. For example, they played with emo bands like Boys Life and Jimmy Eat World, as well as opening for bands like Cheap Trick and Neutral Milk Hotel.

In 1996, the band released their debut album, Now, More Charm and More Tender, on March Records. It was reviewed well upon release and received comparisons to Velocity Girl and Archers of Loaf. However, it faced some criticism about how short the songs were; many of the songs were under a minute and a half.

The band mostly regretted naming themselves Pee and almost changed their name to Miracle Research Center Staff, a name that Connors came up with, but ultimately chose not to. They played two shows under the name before reverting back to Pee. Despite this, they did release an EP with that name through Honey Bear Records in 1997. The release was received with positive reviews, with notes that it sounded more like songs from Now, More Charm with more texture and different tunings. It was around the time of this release that the band changed their name to P.E.E., an acronym short for Potentially Egregious Error.

In 1999, The Roaring Mechanism, the band's second and final album, was released on Absolutely Kosher Records. It received mixed reviews on release, with criticism towards the band's emphasis on experimentation and a focus on prog rock-esque rhythmic shifts. The same year, Jim and Kelly's relationship ended, as well as the practice space P.E.E. and other bands from the area shutting down. The band gradually disbanded while maintaining an amicable relationship, as they became preoccupied with personal commitments. Their final release was a limited-edition split with indie rock band Fuck in 2000, released exclusively through the Cool Beans! zine.

The group reunited in 2009 for Tiber and his wife Kim's 10th anniversary. The following year, they reunited again to play at the 2010 Noise Pop Festival in San Francisco, which regained the members' interest in playing again. This led to the formation of ImPeRiLs, a collaboration between Stanley, Connors, and Allan Moon. They released a sole self-titled album in 2013, but later became inactive.

In 2017, the band self-released Box Demo #2, an album of demos recorded in 1995 before Now, More Charm and More Tender. It was reissued in 2022 on streaming services and cassettes by Deathbomb Arc as i win me over. The band would later release another demo release, Box Demo #1, in 2023. The demo release was recorded in 1994, from the same session their first single was from.

In August 2025, their Bandcamp page, peemusic.bandcamp.com, released many of the band's singles and compilation songs officially in digital form for the first time, as well as a full release of Now, More Charm and More Tender, including the CD-exclusive secret songs "Track 66" and "I Squeeze The Tips Of Your Fingers To Make You Cry", which were left out of the vinyl and streaming service versions. This came with an announcement of "brand new action" coming in 2026, including a reissue of i win me over., as well as posting videos of the members playing songs of theirs and interviews. They additionally announced their first show since 2010, once again playing the Noise Pop Festival. A 30th anniversary version of Now, More Charm and More Tender was released in February 2026 through Heartfelt Records, Milkcrate Merch and Humungulus Records.

== Style ==
While the band has stated they never believed that they were midwest emo, they considered themselves "mathy" in sense. Stanley has called them "grind pop", as many of their songs, especially from Now More Charm, were short in length and "all have a million different parts", while The Roaring Mechanism’s songs were longer and focused more on prog rock-inspired rhythmic sections. Now, More Charm has also been described as "feeling like the bridges (not verses, not choruses - the bridges) of all your favorite songs strung into one emotional, explosive burst of glorious hooky, fragmented power pop".

== Legacy ==
In 2023, YouTuber 108 Mics made a mini-documentary named "A Band Called Pee". It included an interview with the former members. The video, including the growing interest in Now, More Charm from music websites like Rate Your Music, helped the band become more well-known and appreciated. As of March 2026 the album is the sixth-highest rated math pop release on the site.

== Members ==
Current line-up

- Jim Stanley (guitar, vocals)
- Kelly Green (guitar, vocals)
- Andee Connors (drums)
- Tiber Scheer (bass)

Former members

- Jason Mitchell (drums, 1993)
- Bob Albert (bass, 1994-96)

== Discography ==
=== Albums ===
- Now, More Charm and More Tender (1996, March)
- The Roaring Mechanism (1998, Absolutely Kosher)
- Gar Box Sessions #2 (2017, recorded in 1995, reissued as i win me over. by Deathbomb Arc in 2022)

=== EPs ===
- Miracle Research Center Staff (1997, Honey Bear)

=== Singles ===
- "Jonah and the Whale"/"Transplant City" (1993)
- "Salt Garden"/"Icarus the Flat-Footed Pond Bird" (1994)
- "Egghead Billy"/"Turn Key One" (1995)
- Split with Fuck (2000)
- Box Demo #1 (2023, recorded in 1994)
