= Now, More Charm and More Tender =

Studio album by Pee
- Released: March 5, 1996
- Recorded: 1995
- Genre: Math rock; indie rock; noise pop
- Length: 26:50
- Label: March Records; Heartfelt Records; Humungulus Records; Milkcrate Merch; tUMULt
- Producer: Bill Sanke

Pee chronology
Now, More Charm and More Tender (1996)	Miracle Center Research Staff (1997)

Now, More Charm and More Tender is the debut studio album by American math rock band Pee, released in 1996 by March Records. It was recorded in Los Angeles, California by Bill Sanke in 1995.

== Track listing ==
No.	Title	Length
1.	"Arch Enemies"	0:17
2.	"I Hate All Vegetables"	0:49
3.	"IHOP"	2:07
4.	"Copacetic"	1:25
5.	"Home"	1:16
6.	"Treeeeed"	3:33
7.	"Stratford Landing"	1:15
8.	"Helado"	0:04
9.	"Bruce Loves Big Star" (stylized as "Bruce ♥s Big Star")	1:08
10.	"Metallica"	1:04
11.	"See Photo"	1:27
12.	"Plankton"	3:39
13.	"Andee Wants To Impregnate Me With One Half Of Uncle Tupelo"	2:00
14.	"Jose Pelota"	0:06
15.	"Bubulubu"	0:38
16.	"San Salvador"	1:15
17.	"Fight Song (The)"	0:52
18.	"John's Heart Soared"	2:48
19.	"Kelso"	0:57
Total length:		26:50

2026 reissue bonus tracks
No.	Title	Length
20.	"Track 66 (Sketch)"	0:45
21.	"I Squeeze The Tips Of Your Fingers To Make You Cry"	7:57
22.	"Untitled"	0:49

== Personnel ==
Personnel adapted from the liner notes of the 2026 vinyl reissue.

=== Pee ===
- Jim Stanley
- Kelly Green
- Bob Albert
- Andee Connors

=== Other personnel ===
- Bill Sanke – recording
- Carl Saff – remastering (2026 reissue)
