= The Wrens =

American indie rock band

- Origin: Secaucus, New Jersey, U.S.
- Genres: Indie rock, alternative rock
- Years active: 1989–2021
- Labels: Sub Pop; Grass Records; Saddle Creek; Ten 23; No Karma; Absolutely Kosher Records; LO-MAX Records; BB*Island
- Past members: Charles Bissell; Greg Whelan; Kevin Whelan; Jerry MacDonald
- Website: www.wrens.com

The Wrens were an American indie rock band from New Jersey. The group consisted of Charles Bissell (guitar/vocals), brothers Greg Whelan (guitar/vocals) and Kevin Whelan (bass/vocals), and Jerry MacDonald (drums). They released three albums; a fourth album was recorded and mastered for a planned 2013 release, but was subsequently retracted. After reworking his contributions, Bissell teased a 2021 release for the new album, but the band broke up shortly after following disagreements over business arrangements. The band had a reputation for their intense live shows – following a gig at the University of London Union in London in March 2006, The Guardian declared that "on this form the Wrens are surely one of the best live bands in the world".

== History ==
Brothers Greg and Kevin Whelan formed their band in the late 1980s, recruiting former high school classmate Charles Bissell in 1989 as a guitarist for a proposed gig supporting The Fixx, which was cancelled in the end. Jerry MacDonald replaced the band's original drummer in 1990 and the quartet moved into a house together in the town of Secaucus, New Jersey, to concentrate on their music career. After a number of name changes the group settled on the name Low, and in 1993 they recorded a 7-inch single with the same name which they sent out to various record companies – one of them, Grass Records, signed the band almost immediately on hearing the record. However, on learning that there was already a slowcore group named Low, the band changed their name to the Wrens in 1994.

By 1996, the Wrens had released two full-length albums, Silver (1994) and Secaucus (1996). Both arrived to critical acclaim and gained a following of fans. In summer 1995 Grass Records was bought out by businessman Alan Meltzer, who wanted to refocus the label on scoring more mainstream popularity and hit songs. During their 1996 tour for Secaucus the band was offered a new long-term contract for over a million dollars, on condition that in the future they tailor their songs to a more radio-friendly sound. Fearing loss of independence and a watering down of their music, the band refused to sign the contract. As a result, they were not offered another record deal and all production and promotion of their previous two albums was stopped. Meltzer changed Grass Records' name to Wind-Up Records, eventually scoring the mainstream success he sought with groups such as Creed and Evanescence. The Wrens battled for years afterwards to try to regain the rights to the albums in order to make them available again – in 2006 Wind-Up finally relented and re-released Silver and Secaucus on November 14 of that year, although the label retained the rights to the records.

Following the termination of their contract with Grass Records, a six-track EP, Abbott 1135, was released in 1997 on Ten23 Records (the label run by the people who had originally signed the Wrens to Grass Records). The same year a cassette titled Overnight Success was circulated, featuring early demo versions of songs that would appear on their third album, although to date this cassette has never been officially released. Despite spending more than a year in discussions with various major labels, notably Interscope Records, in order to secure a record contract, none of the talks resulted in a deal. With no contract and their financial lifeline cut off, the members of the Wrens took full-time jobs while they began work on their third album in 1999. By this point drummer MacDonald was married with a young family and had moved out, but the other three members were still living together in the same house in Fort Lee, New Jersey, where MacDonald would join them to record new material when he was able to. The problems with the record labels are usually cited as the reason for the slow progress on the album, although in a 2004 interview Charles Bissell conceded that a far bigger problem had been the combination of exhaustion, writer's block and lack of confidence in the new material which caused them to extensively re-write or scrap many songs.

It took four years before the record, titled The Meadowlands, was finally completed in early 2003. The Wrens had received an offer a few years previously to release the album on Drive-Thru Records, but decided instead to sign to Absolutely Kosher Records, run by their friend Cory Brown. The album was more varied than their first two records, containing longer and more downbeat songs than their previous records (a fact noted by several critics), dealing with the problems they had experienced with record labels and the concerns of a more grown-up band, such as family life and jobs. The album received overwhelmingly positive reviews from the music press, in publications such as AllMusic, Pitchfork and praise from critic Robert Christgau. The album was described by The New York Times as a "nearly universally acclaimed disc of bright literate pop". It took a further two years before the album was released in Europe on LO-MAX Records and on the German BB*Island label, to similarly rave reviews.

Despite the critical success of The Meadowlands, the band were unable to start work quickly on a follow-up album due to financial and personal constraints: Bissell had left his job in advertising to earn his living as a guitar teacher but the other three members remain in full-time employment (the Whelan brothers work for a multinational pharmaceutical company in New York City and MacDonald works in the sales division of a financial services company in Philadelphia), and the band no longer had a single house where the members could demo ideas and record songs, as both Bissell and Greg Whelan had gotten married and moved out. In 2006, the Wrens recorded a cover of the song "They'll Need A Crane" for the tribute album Hello Radio: The Songs of They Might Be Giants. The band also contributed a new song, "Crescent", to Dear New Orleans, a 2010 benefit album released to raise funds and mark the fifth anniversary of the Hurricane Katrina disaster.

On May 1, 2014, the Wrens' Twitter account said that the band had finished recording its fourth album. No release date was announced. In late November 2015, the band released an alternate version of a song from the album, "Three Types of Reading Ambiguity", which was made available to premium subscribers of Esopus Magazine. The song was released on a limited edition audio cassette, which also included another version of the song performed by artist Beth Campbell.

In a January 2021 interview with Uproxx, Bissell stated that the fourth album was finished in June 2019, and that the band had signed to an unspecified record label years earlier who would hopefully release the album in 2021. Bissell noted that "we had some band stuff to work out, to get everyone back on board again".

On September 20, 2021, The New York Times reported that Kevin Whelan would be releasing some of his contributions to the unreleased fourth Wrens album under the name Aeon Station with support from Greg Whelan and Jerry MacDonald, and that Kevin Whelan and Bissell were no longer speaking. The report indicated that the fourth Wrens album had been completed, mastered, and given to Sub Pop for release in 2013 before being retracted at Bissell's request so he could further develop his songs. In 2019, Bissell completed his contributions, then approached the rest of the band seeking a new business arrangement that reflected both his work as a songwriter and his work maintaining the Wrens' presence online and in the music industry. Whelan said that he "was never against that, but when we started talking about how to do it, it got very drawn out and complicated” and that he was done waiting, which led to the creation of Aeon Station to release his songs. Bissell subsequently indicated "that the Wrens were dead" and that he was planning his own album to release his songs.

In October 2023, Bissell announced that tracks he had initially composed for The Wrens' fourth album would be released in early 2024 under the name Car Colors via Absolutely Kosher Records. A single from the album, "Old Death," was released on November 17, 2023. Since then, two B-sides and a rendition of O Holy Night were released on Spotify, but as of June 2026 no album has emerged.

== Aeon Station ==
Aeon Station’s debut album Observatory, was released by Sub Pop Records on December 10, 2021. It was previewed by the singles "Queens", "Leaves" and "Fade".

== Discography ==
=== Albums ===
- Silver (Grass Records, 1994)
- Secaucus (Grass Records, 1996)
- The Meadowlands (Absolutely Kosher Records, 2003/LO-MAX Records/BB*Island, 2005)

=== Singles ===
- "Low" (Dow Boy Records (self-released), 1993)
- "Napiers" (Grass Records, 1994)
- "Life Stories from the Union" (Sonic Bubblegum Records, 1995)
- "Rest Your Head" (Grass Records, 1996)
- Split single with Park Ave. – The Wrens track: "Fireworks"/"James, I Wanna" (Saddle Creek Records, 1997)
- "Hopeless" (digital download only, LO-MAX Records, 2006)
- "Pulled Fences" (Absolutely Kosher Records, 2009)

=== EPs ===
- Abbott 1135 (Ten23 Records, 1997 – reissued on Absolutely Kosher Records, 2005)
- Split EP with The Five Mod Four – The Wrens tracks: "Was There Ever", "Bus Dance", "45'er" (No Karma, 2002 – reissued on Contraphonic, 2005)

=== Self-released unofficial recordings ===
- Overnight Success (self-released 10-track demo album, 1998)
- 20 Years of Juvenilia EP (self-released limited-edition CD-R EP sold at their 20th anniversary shows at Maxwell's in Hoboken, New Jersey, December 2009)
- Three Types of Reading Ambiguity cassette (self-released limited edition audio cassette available to premium subscribers of Esopus Magazine, November 2015)
