= The Golden River (album) =

Studio album by Frog Eyes
- Released: 1 July 2003
- Recorded: December 2002
- Genre: Indie rock
- Length: 31:43
- Label: Animal World
- Producer: Tolan McNeil

Frog Eyes chronology
The Bloody Hand (2002)	The Golden River (2003)	Ego Scriptor (2004)

Professional ratings
Review scores
Source	Rating
AllMusic	link
Pitchfork	8.2/10
Dusted Magazine	–
Stylus	B+

The Golden River is the second full length album by Canadian indie rock band Frog Eyes. It is critically acclaimed and regarded by many as their best work.

== Track listing ==
1. "One in Six Children Will Flee in Boats" – 4:15
2. "Time Reveals Its Plan at Poisoned Falls" – 1:30
3. "Masticated Outboard Motors" – 3:20
4. "Miasma Gardens" – 4:27
5. "A Latex Ice Age" – 3:37
6. "Orbis Magnes" – 2:08
7. "Time Destroys Its Plan at the Reactionary Table" – 3:04
8. "Soldiers Crash Gathering in Sparrow Hills" – 3:02
9. "World's Greatest Concertos" – 2:00
10. "Picture Framing the Gigantic Men Who Fought on Steam Boats" – 3:43
11. "The Secret Map Flees from Plurality" – 0:37

== Emboldened Navigator and the Seagull Dots ==
The Golden River was re-released in 2006 with an album of bonus tracks. This album was never officially released by itself. The liner notes call this album Emboldened Navigator and the Seagull Dots. In this re-release, The Golden River is unchanged, followed by an intermission, and Emboldened Navigator And The Seagull Dots then plays. It features 23 songs (24 including the 31-second intermission). These tracks are from pre-Golden River sessions in 2001 that featured Spencer Krug on keyboards. The only songs unique to this release are "?" and "Spencer's Song for Carey to Officially Sing." Tracks 14, 15 and 17 are early recordings of songs that would eventually come out on The Golden River. Tracks 13, 16, 20, and 22 were already released on the Emboldened Navigator 7". Tracks 12 and 23 were already released on The Bloody Hand. Track 21 had already been released on Sunset Rubdown's Snake's Got a Leg.

== Track listing ==
1. "Fruit That Ate Itself" – 2:48
2. "Meadows and Madames and So Forth" – 2:27
3. "Latex Ice Age" – 1:45
4. "Picture Framing and Some Other Dark Shit" – 3:18
5. "American Waltz for the Good Americans" – 2:24
6. "One in Six Children Will Flee in Boats" – 4:49
7. "?" – 3:11
8. "Spencers' Song for Carey to Officially Sing" – 4:51
9. "I Hope My Horse Don't Make No Sound" – 2:20
10. "A Song Once Mine Now No Longer Mine" – 4:06
11. ""Shots"" – 3:03
12. "Libertatia National Lullaby" – 4:25
