= Observatory (Aeon Station album) =

Studio album by Aeon Station
- Released: December 10, 2021
- Label: Sub Pop

Professional ratings
Review scores
Source	Rating
AllMusic	3.5/5 stars
Beats Per Minute	72%
Pitchfork	7.6/10

Observatory is the debut studio album by American indie rock band Aeon Station. The project was started by Kevin Whelan of The Wrens, frustrated with continuous delays in the release of music by his band. Many of the tracks that appear on Observatory were originally written and recorded for what was intended to be the Wrens' fourth album. Greg Whelan and Jerry MacDonald, Whelan's bandmates from The Wrens, also contributed to Observatory.
