= The Future Is Inter-Disciplinary or Not at All =

EP by Frog Eyes
- Released: 2006
- Label: Acuarela Discos

Frog Eyes chronology
Ego Scriptor (2004)	The Future Is Inter-Disciplinary or Not at All (2006)	Tears of the Valedictorian (2007)

Professional ratings
Review scores
Source	Rating
Coke Machine Glow	54%
Pitchfork	(5.2/10)

The Future Is Inter-Disciplinary or Not at All is an EP by Frog Eyes, released by Acuarela Discos in Spain in 2006.

The EP was not as well received as previous releases. Cokemachineglow claimed the EP "isn't good", and the level to which it can frustrate longtime Frog Eyes fans is "staggering". Pitchfork calls the album "disappointing".

== Track listing ==
1. "Future Fortress"
2. "Really the End of Time?"
3. "Sheldon's Phone Calling the Future That Is All Alive"
4. "A Feeling: I Feel It"
5. "I Am Telling You That Cities Were Never Ever Conceived Like This"
6. "Politics"
7. "Of Friendship"
8. "A Future Begs a Hero"
