= Knife Play =

Studio album by Xiu Xiu
- Released: February 19, 2002
- Recorded: 2001–2002
- Studio: Unknown studio (San Jose, California)
- Genre: Indie rock; post-rock; post-punk; avant-garde
- Length: 43:14
- Label: 5 Rue Christine; Kill Rock Stars; Absolutely Kosher
- Producer: Jamie Stewart

Xiu Xiu chronology
| Knife Play (2002) | Chapel of the Chimes (2002) |

Knife Play is the debut studio album by American experimental rock band Xiu Xiu, released on February 19, 2002.

== Content ==
A sticker on the cover of the album reads "When my mom died I listened to Henry Cowell, Joy Division, Detroit techno, the Smiths, Takemitsu, Sabbath, Gamelan, Black Angels and Cecil Taylor". The title is a reference to knife play. Noted themes include familial dysfunction, violence and despair. "Hives Hives" is a cover of the IBOPA song "Hives" that references AIDS and HIV, and "Dr. Troll" is about a young transgender girl who teaches a class of preschoolers. "Suha" is about the titular 25-year-old woman, and features lyrics describing how Suha wants to commit suicide by cop. "Luber" is about a child named Luber who Jamie Stewart encountered buying Smashing Pumpkins records while working at a record store in San Jose. "Poe Poe" is about a sugar daddy. "I Broke Up (SJ)" is about the violent breakup of a relationship. "Don Diasco" is named after Don Dias, former member of Ten in the Swear Jar. "Homonculus" is about someone who was romantically interested with at-the-time Xiu Xiu member Yvonne Chen.

== Reception ==
Professional ratings
Review scores
| Source | Rating |
|---|---|
| AllMusic | 3/5 stars |
| Cokemachineglow | 71% |
| Pitchfork | 8.3/10 |
| Sputnikmusic | 5.0/5 |
| Stylus | D+ |
| Tiny Mix Tapes | 4/5 stars |

Christopher Dare, writing for Pitchfork, though noting that "many who've bought the album for [the listed] influences aren't prepared for his tantrums", stated that the album "makes you reevaluate your opinion on what emotions music has the right to explore."

== Packaging ==
Knife Play was initially issued on CD by 5 Rue Christine and LP by Absolutely Kosher Records. The CD packaging features a two-page comic, illustrating an unnamed girl awake at 4:01 AM mourning a hospitalized loved one who was involved in an accident. The comic takes place over three hours, and the final panel is the unnamed girl holding her face in her hands on her bed.

The first LP release, by Absolutely Kosher, was a 12" black vinyl record in a paper inner sleeve wrapped in a 35" by 23" newsprint sleeve. This issue did not come with a standard LP cover. Knife Play was issued on CD and LP by Tomlab in Germany in 2003. Knife Play was also remastered and repressed by Absolutely Kosher in 2003, this time in the same design as the newsprint sleeve, but the sleeve itself was printed on standard heavyweight paper. The back cover features a calendar with a fictional month, 28 days and 8 days to the week, resulting in four days at the end not assigned to one of the three previous weeks. The first day of the week is unnamed, while the next seven follow the convention: Monday, Tuesday, Wednesday, Thursday, Friday, Saturday and Sunday.

In 2014, Stoned to Death reissued Knife Play on cassette tape in a limited edition of 100 copies. In 2017, Graveface Records reissued Knife Play on vinyl with a bonus 7". The bonus 7" featured a live version of "I Broke Up (SJ)" and an acoustic version of "Don Diasco". This issue also features printed lyrics and a note from Jamie Stewart regarding the production, recording and publishing of Knife Play.

== Track listing ==
| No. | Title | Length |
|---|---|---|
| 1. | "Don Diasco" | 2:54 |
| 2. | "I Broke Up (SJ)" | 2:20 |
| 3. | "Luber" | 4:02 |
| 4. | "Hives Hives" | 3:42 |
| 5. | "Dr. Troll" | 3:54 |
| 6. | "Over Over" | 4:05 |
| 7. | "Anne Dong" | 4:51 |
| 8. | "Suha" | 4:57 |
| 9. | "Poe Poe" | 3:40 |
| 10. | "Homonculus" | 3:20 |
| 11. | "Tonite and Today (What Chu' Talkin' 'Bout)" | 5:22 |
| Total length: | | 43:14 |

== Personnel ==
Xiu Xiu

- Jamie Stewart – vocals, guitar, harmonium, programming
- Lauren Andrews – synthesizer, piano, bells
- Cory McCulloch – bass, synthesizer, mandolin, feedback
- Yvonne Chen – synthesizer, trumpet, percussions, gong

Additional musicians

- Ches Smith – drums
- Greg Saunier – drums
- Tally Jones – cello
- Don Dias – bass accordion
- Sergio Bernal – trumpet
- Jason Albertini – guitar
- Jarod Flores – alto sax
- Jafid Moran – tenor sax
- Kurt Stumbaugh – baritone sax

Production

- George Horn – mastering
