= The Court & Spark =

American indie rock band

- Origin: United States
- Genres: Alt. Country; Experimental rock
- Years active: 1998–2007
- Labels: Absolutely Kosher Records; Camera Records; BB*ISLAND!
- Members: MC Taylor; Scott Hirsch; Alex Stimmel; James Kim; Dan Carr; Tom Heyman; Patrick Main; Terri Loewenthal; Wendy Allen
- Website: The Court & Spark Page at Dream Chimney

The Court & Spark was a San Francisco-based indie rock band formed in the spring of 1998 by Scott Hirsch, Alex Stimmel, James Kim, and lead vocalist M.C. Taylor. Between 1998 and 2001 the group was part of the alt-country Americana scene.

== History ==
Hirsch and Taylor had previously been members of a band called Ex-Ignota, before moving to San Francisco and forming the country-oriented group, which released their debut album Ventura Whites on Tumult Records in 1999. Court & Spark is the title of a 1974 Joni Mitchell album.

In 2001 the band released Bless You, which also featured pedal steel player Tom Heyman and vocalist Wendy Allen, as well as Gene Parsons, formerly of The Byrds and The Flying Burrito Brothers. A review in Pitchfork by Christopher F. Schiel gave the album a score of 9.0, later downgraded to 8.4, and the album was also featured on NPR's All Things Considered by Sarah Bardeen in December 2001.

The band returned in 2004 with Witch Season and the Dead Diamond River EP, featuring contributions from Linda Thompson and M. Ward.

The Court & Spark disbanded in the summer of 2007 with an announcement on the band's website: "It's hard to say that The C&S is breaking up, as we still spend all our time together, but seeing as how we're all involved in different musical projects, it seems best to retire the C&S name for a while. We've had a good run and have had the good fortune to meet all kinds of wonderful souls as we've stumbled down the road. Thank you one and all for everything you've given us."

Taylor and Hirsch moved to the East Coast—Taylor to Chapel Hill, North Carolina, and Hirsch to New York City—and started a new project together called Hiss Golden Messenger which has released seven albums.

== Discography ==
- Ventura Whites (Tumult Records, 1999)
- Bless You (Absolutely Kosher Records, 2001)
- Double Roses EP (Prophecy Connection, 2003)
- Witch Season (Absolutely Kosher, 2004)
- Dead Diamond River EP (Absolutely Kosher, 2004)
- Hearts (Absolutely Kosher, 2006)
