= Ego Scriptor =

Studio album by Frog Eyes
- Released: 2004
- Label: Absolutely Kosher

Frog Eyes chronology
The Golden River (2003)	Ego Scriptor (2004)	The Folded Palm (2004)

Professional ratings
Review scores
Source	Rating
Pitchfork	7.7/10 stars

Ego Scriptor is a 2004 album by Frog Eyes. It contains acoustic versions of songs from other Frog Eyes albums.

The phrase "Ego Scriptor" means " I, the writer" in Latin, and may refer to the French poet Paul Valéry's essay of the same name in which he describes the "self‑reflecting process...both the 'real' work of the mind and the 'chore' of writing to command." In it, Valéry also talks about the isolation of an author upon publishing their work.

== Track listing ==
1. "A Latex Ice Age"
2. "Ship Destroyer"
3. "Silence But for the Gentle Tinkling of the Flowing Creek"
4. "Masticated Outboard Motors"
5. "Bells in the Crooked Port"
6. "I Like Dot Dot Dot"
7. "The Akhian Press"
8. "Our Lordship Has Devised a New Billing System"
9. "One in Six Children Will Flee in Boats"
10. "Sound Travels from the Snow to the Dark"
11. "The Fox Speaks to His Wife Who Is Not Quite Sure"
