= Heart Like a Levee =

Studio album by Hiss Golden Messenger
- Released: October 7, 2016
- Length: 42:55; 1:10:00 (Deluxe)
- Label: Merge
- Producers: M.C. Taylor; Bradley Cook

Hiss Golden Messenger chronology
Lateness of Dancers (2014)	Heart Like a Levee (2016)	Vestapol (2016)

Professional ratings
Aggregate scores
Source	Rating
Metacritic	81/100
Review scores
Source	Rating
AllMusic	4/5 stars
Classic Rock Magazine	4.5/5 stars
DIY Magazine	3/5 stars
Pitchfork	8.2/10

Heart Like a Levee is the seventh studio album by American band Hiss Golden Messenger. It was released on October 7, 2016, under Merge Records.

The album was produced by M.C. Taylor and Bradley Cook (Megafaun) in Durham, North Carolina.

== Critical reception ==
Heart Like a Levee was met with universal acclaim reviews from critics. At Metacritic, which assigns a weighted average rating out of 100 to reviews from mainstream publications, this release received an average score of 81, based on 12 reviews.

=== Accolades ===
Accolades for Heart Like a Levee
Publication	Accolade	Rank	Ref.
American Songwriter	Top 50 Albums of 2016	24	
The Independent	Top 20 Albums of 2016	18	
Paste	Top 50 Albums of 2016	45	

== Track listing ==
Heart Like a Levee track listing
No.	Title	Length
1.	"Biloxi"	2:51
2.	"Tell Her I'm Just Dancing"	3:01
3.	"Heart Like a Levee"	3:52
4.	"Like a Mirror Loves a Hammer"	4:23
5.	"Smoky's Song"	1:20
6.	"Cracked Windshield"	5:07
7.	"As the Crow Flies"	3:14
8.	"Happy Day (Sister My Sister)"	5:28
9.	"Say It Like You Mean It"	2:52
10.	"Ace of Cups"	4:48
11.	"Highland Grace"	5:58

iTunes Deluxe Edition
No.	Title	Length
1.	"Blackeyed Boy"	5:04
2.	"After the Colors"	3:02
3.	"Together's Just a Word"	3:23
4.	"Living Above the Waterline"	2:47
5.	"Strawberry Girl Reel"	2:27
6.	"Little Rain"	3:52
7.	"John the Gun"	2:51
8.	"Vestapol"	3:39

== Personnel ==
- MC Taylor - lead vocals, acoustic and electric guitars, mandolin
- Phil Cook - acoustic and electric guitars, piano, Wurlitzer, clavinet, organ, banjo, synths, background vocals
- Brad Cook - bass guitar, acoustic guitar, synths, background vocals
- Matt McCaughan - drums, percussion, background vocals
- Chris Boerner - baritone and electric guitars ("Happy Day (Sister My Sister)"), background vocals ("Tell Her I'm Just Dancing")
- Josh Kaufman - electric guitar ("Tell Her I'm Just Dancing", "Highland Grace")
- Ryan Gustafson - electric guitar ("Like a Mirror Loves a Hammer")
- Michael Lewis - saxophone, background vocals
- Matt Douglas - saxophone, baritone saxophone
- Rob Moose - strings
- Alexandra Sauser-Monnig - background vocals
- Tift Merritt - background vocals
- Sonyia Turner - background vocals

== Charts ==
Chart performance for Heart Like a Levee
Chart (2016)	Peak position
US Americana/Folk Albums (Billboard)	19
US Top Rock Albums (Billboard)	49
US Independent Albums (Billboard)	37
