= Jukeboxer =

American musician

Jukeboxer is the moniker of the American, Brooklyn-based musician, Noah Wall. His music is put together digitally from recorded sounds, usually him playing an instrument. Many of his songs are the products of collaborations with other musicians. He has released two albums, a single and an EP.

== Discography ==
- Jukeboxer Learns the Alphabet CD, 2001
- Man Throughout the Ages 12" EP, 2003
- "Parenthetical" 7", 2003
- Jukeboxer in the Food Chain CD, 2004
