= Terms of Surrender =

Studio album by Hiss Golden Messenger
- Released: September 20, 2019
- Studio: Long Pond Studio, New York; Sound City Studios, Los Angeles
- Length: 39:07
- Label: Merge

Hiss Golden Messenger chronology
Virgo Fool (2018)	Terms of Surrender (2019)

Professional ratings
Aggregate scores
Source	Rating
Metacritic	78/100
Review scores
Source	Rating
AllMusic	4/5 stars
No Ripcord	7/10
Pitchfork	6.5/10
Rolling Stone	3.5/5 stars

Terms of Surrender is a studio album by American band Hiss Golden Messenger. It was released on September 20, 2019 under Merge Records. The album was produced by MC Taylor and Brad Cook.

== Critical reception ==
Terms of Surrender was met with generally favorable reviews from critics. At Metacritic, which assigns a weighted average rating out of 100 to reviews from mainstream publications, this release received an average score of 78, based on 13 reviews.

=== Accolades ===
Accolades for Terms of Surrender
Publication	Accolade	Rank	Ref.
Magnet Magazine	Top 25 Albums of 2019	20	
Mojo Magazine	Top 75 Albums of 2019	71	

The album received a nomination for Best Americana Album at the 63rd Annual Grammy Awards.

== Track listing ==
All tracks are written by MC Taylor (except "Terms of Surrender", written by Taylor and Brad Cook).

Terms of Surrender track listing
No.	Title	Length
1.	"I Need a Teacher"	3:17
2.	"Bright Direction (You're a Dark Star Now)"	4:24
3.	"My Wing"	4:26
4.	"Old Enough to Wonder Why (East Side—West Side)"	4:23
5.	"Cat's Eye Blue"	3:49
6.	"Happy Birthday, Baby"	3:45
7.	"Down at the Uptown"	3:26
8.	"Katy (You Don't Have to Be Good Yet)"	3:57
9.	"Whip"	4:29
10.	"Terms of Surrender"	3:11

== Personnel ==
- MC Taylor - lead vocals, acoustic and electric guitars, banjo
- Phil Cook - acoustic and electric pianos, organ, electric guitar, harmonica
- Brad Cook - bass guitar, mandolin, synths
- Aaron Dessner - electric guitar, high-strung acoustic guitar, piano
- Josh Kaufman - acoustic and electric guitars, lap steel, synths
- Matt McCaughan - drums, percussion, Omnichord
- Jenny Lewis - harmony vocals
- Alexandra Sauser-Monnig - harmony vocals
- Madalyn Stefanak - harmony vocals

== Charts ==
Chart performance for Terms of Surrender
Chart (2019)	Peak position
US Heatseekers Albums (Billboard)	3
US Independent Albums (Billboard)	61
