= Chapel of the Chimes (EP) =

EP by Xiu Xiu
- Released: 2002
- Genre: Experimental rock
- Length: 18:16
- Label: Absolutely Kosher
- Producer: Jamie Stewart

Xiu Xiu chronology
Knife Play (2002)	Chapel of the Chimes (2002)	A Promise (2003)

Professional ratings
Review scores
Source	Rating
AllMusic	3/5 stars
Pitchfork	7.4/10
Stylus	C+

Chapel of the Chimes is a 2002 EP by Xiu Xiu. It features a cover of "Ceremony", originally by Joy Division. The title of the EP is a reference to the Chapel of the Chimes in Oakland, California, located north of San Jose, the band's city of origin.

== Track listing ==
1. "I Am the Center of Your World" – 3:00
2. "Jennifer Lopez" (The Sweet Science Version) – 2:38
3. "Ten-Thousand-Times-a-Minute" – 3:29
4. "King Earth, King Earth" – 4:40
5. "Ceremony" (Ian Curtis, Bernard Sumner, Peter Hook, Stephen Morris) – 4:29

== Personnel ==
- Jamie Stewart – vocals, piano, programming, guitar, harmonium
- Lauren Andrews – mandolin, guitar, synthesizer, production
- Yvonne Chen – bass, bells, synthesizer
- Cory McCulloch – synthesizer, bass, switchblade, feedback

Additional personnel

- Jherek Bischoff – upright bass
- Korum Bischoff – drums
- Zach Hill – bells, gongs
- Jamie Peterson – snare drum
- Kurt Stumbaugh – baritone sax
- Zack Wentz – drums
- Jorge Tapia – art, layout
- Carl Saff – mastering
- Mira O'Brian – artwork
