= Melanie Campbell =

Professor of physics

- Education: University of Toronto, BSc; University of Waterloo, MSc; Australian National University, PhD
- Scientific career
- Institutions: University of Waterloo
- Thesis: Gradient refractive index optics and image quality in the rat eye (1982)
- Website: uwaterloo.ca/campbell-labs/people-profiles/melanie-campbell

Melanie Crombie Williams Campbell is a professor of physics at the University of Waterloo. Cross-appointed with the School of Optometry and Vision Science, she is known for the development of light activated treatments for eye disease and non-invasive imaging techniques for the detection of Alzheimer's disease through the identification of retinal amyloids.

== Career ==
Campbell obtained a bachelor of science in chemical physics from the University of Toronto in 1975 and a master of science in physics from the University of Waterloo in 1977. She completed her PhD at the Australian National University in 1982 where she was the first female graduate student to study in the department of Applied Mathematics. Her PhD thesis, titled Gradient refractive index optics and image quality in the rat eye, was completed under the supervision of Austin Hughes, Colin Pask and Allan Snyder.

Campbell is a professor of physics at the University of Waterloo where she is cross-appointed with the School of Optometry and Vision Science and is a member of the Waterloo Institute for Nanotechnology. Her career in physics began with the study of the optics of the eye. Over time her work has taken on a multidisciplinary approach, in which she blends physics and biology as a way to develop and improve disease diagnostics.

In 2016, along with colleagues at the University of British Columbia, the University of Rochester, Massachusetts General Hospital, Vivocore Inc. and InterVivo Solutions, it was announced that Campbell had developed a method for detecting amyloid proteins in the eye, biomarkers associated with Alzheimer's disease, which may allow for the detection of the diseases prior to symptom presentation. Campbell explained in an interview with the Canadian Broadcasting Corporation that: "The ability to detect amyloid deposits in the retina prior to disease symptoms may be an essential tool for the development of preventative strategies for Alzheimer's and other dementias." The research team believes that the amyloids may appear in the eye after leaking from cerebrospinal fluid.

Over the course of her career, Campbell has advocated for the rights of female researchers and has led by example in doing so. She was the first person to take maternity leave as a Commonwealth Scientific and Industrial Research Organisation postdoctoral fellow and as a Natural Sciences and Engineering Research Council university research fellow.

Campbell has served as the President of the Canadian Association of Physicists and is a fellow of the Optical Society, the Canadian Association of Physicists and the American Physical Society.

== Awards and honours ==
- 2019 Laird Lecturer, Western University
- 2015 Status of Women Award of Distinction, Ontario Confederation of University Faculty Association
- 2014 Medal for Outstanding Achievement in Applied Photonics, CAP-INO
- 2013 Clair Bobier Distinguished Lecturer, University of Waterloo
- 2004 Rank Prize for Optoelectronics, The Rank Prize Funds
