= Secaucus (album) =

Studio album by The Wrens
- Released: 1996
- Recorded: 1995–1996
- Genre: Indie rock, power pop
- Length: 54:02
- Label: Grass Records
- Producer: Pedal Boy

The Wrens chronology
Silver (1994)	Secaucus (1996)	The Meadowlands (2003)

Professional ratings
Review scores
Source	Rating
AllMusic	4/5 stars
Dayton Daily News	3/4 stars
The Encyclopedia of Popular Music	4/5 stars
Pitchfork	8.6/10

Secaucus is the second album by the American rock band The Wrens, released in 1996. Secaucus is named for the city in which it was recorded, Secaucus, New Jersey. The Wrens were signed to major label Grass Records for the album; Grass dropped the band after they refused to be forced into a new contract. The Wrens' follow-up to Secaucus, The Meadowlands, was released seven years later, in 2003.

== Critical reception ==
Spin deemed Secaucus a "Pixies-lovin’ garage-pop grab-bag." Trouser Press wrote: "The album displays the Wrens’ newly impressive range, from the racing shamble of the opening 'Yellow Number Three' and the glammy, vamping 'Built in Girls' to 'I'll Mind You', which is an ambient, spacey instrumental." Robert Christgau, in The Village Voice, wrote that "the sonic turf is far broader than most indie bands ever dare, and there's a relationship sequence in the middle that lays on the hurt--'I've Made Enough Friends', killer." The Philadelphia Inquirer wrote that the album "combines artful '60s pop and razor-sharp, late-'70s new wave."

== Track listing ==
No.	Title	Length
1.	"Yellow Number Three"	1:04
2.	"Built in Girls"	3:00
3.	"Surprise, Honeycomb"	3:58
4.	"Rest Your Head"	3:24
5.	"Won't Get Too Far"	3:02
6.	"Joneses Rule of Sport"	3:46
7.	"Dance the Midwest"	2:20
8.	"Still Complaining"	2:43
9.	"Hats off to Marriage, Baby"	2:37
10.	"Jane Fakes a Hug"	5:05
11.	"Counted on Sweetness"	2:54
12.	"I've Made Enough Friends"	2:48
13.	"Luxury"	2:35
14.	"Indie 500"	3:08
15.	"Safe and Comfortable"	3:27
16.	"Destruction/Drawn"	1:28
17.	"I Married Sonja"	2:43
18.	"I'll Mind You"	1:25
19.	"It's Not Getting Any Good"	2:25
Total length:		54:02
