= Absolutely Kosher Records =

Independent California record label

- Founded: 1998
- Founder: Cory Brown
- Status: Active
- Distributor: FUGA
- Genre: Indie
- Country of origin: United States
- Location: Emeryville, California; Berkeley, California; San Francisco, California
- Official website: absolutely-kosher.com

Absolutely Kosher Records is an independent California-based record label founded in 1998 in San Francisco by Cory Brown. The label moved to Berkeley in 2002 and then to Emeryville in October 2006 when it partnered with Misra Records for 3 years before separating.

Absolutely Kosher has been listed on the RIAA website since 2005 as a distributed label of a reporting member (Fontana, the label's distributor). However, the label is not itself a member, and neither pay dues nor corresponds with the RIAA. Absolutely Kosher is a member in good standing with A2IM.

On September 20, 2011, a statement from Cory Brown was placed on the label's website informing people that the label would cease to release any more records for the foreseeable future due to financial difficulties.

On October 6, 2023, Charles Bissell of The Wrens announced that he would be releasing new music under the name Car Colors and that his first 12" and the album to follow would be released on Absolutely Kosher. Absolutely Kosher issued a statement shortly thereafter that they were relaunching the label after a 12-year absence for its 25th anniversary with a variety of new releases, reissues, and marketing initiatives.

== Bands and artists ==
- The Affair
- Azeda Booth
- Bottom of the Hudson
- Brabrabra
- Franklin Bruno
- Car Colors
- Chet
- The Court and Spark
- Rob Crow
- The Dead Science
- The Dudley Corporation
- Edinburgh School for the Deaf
- Eltro
- The Ex-Boyfriends
- The Extra Glenns
- Frog Eyes
- The Gang
- Chris Garneau
- Get Him Eat Him
- Goblin Cock
- Jack Hayter
- The Hidden Cameras
- The Jim Yoshii Pile-Up
- Jukeboxer
- Laarks
- Life Without Buildings
- Little Teeth
- The Mountain Goats
- New Bad Things
- Nonconnah
- Okay
- Optiganally Yours
- P.E.E.
- Pidgeon
- Pinback
- The Places
- +/-
- The Rollercoaster Project
- 60 Watt Kid
- Spaceheads
- Summer at Shatter Creek
- Sunset Rubdown
- Swords Project
- Sybris
- Telegraph Melts
- Thingy
- Two Guys
- Virginia Dare
- Wax Fang
- Withered Hand
- The Wrens
- Xiu Xiu

== See also ==
- List of record labels
