= Death Grips discography =

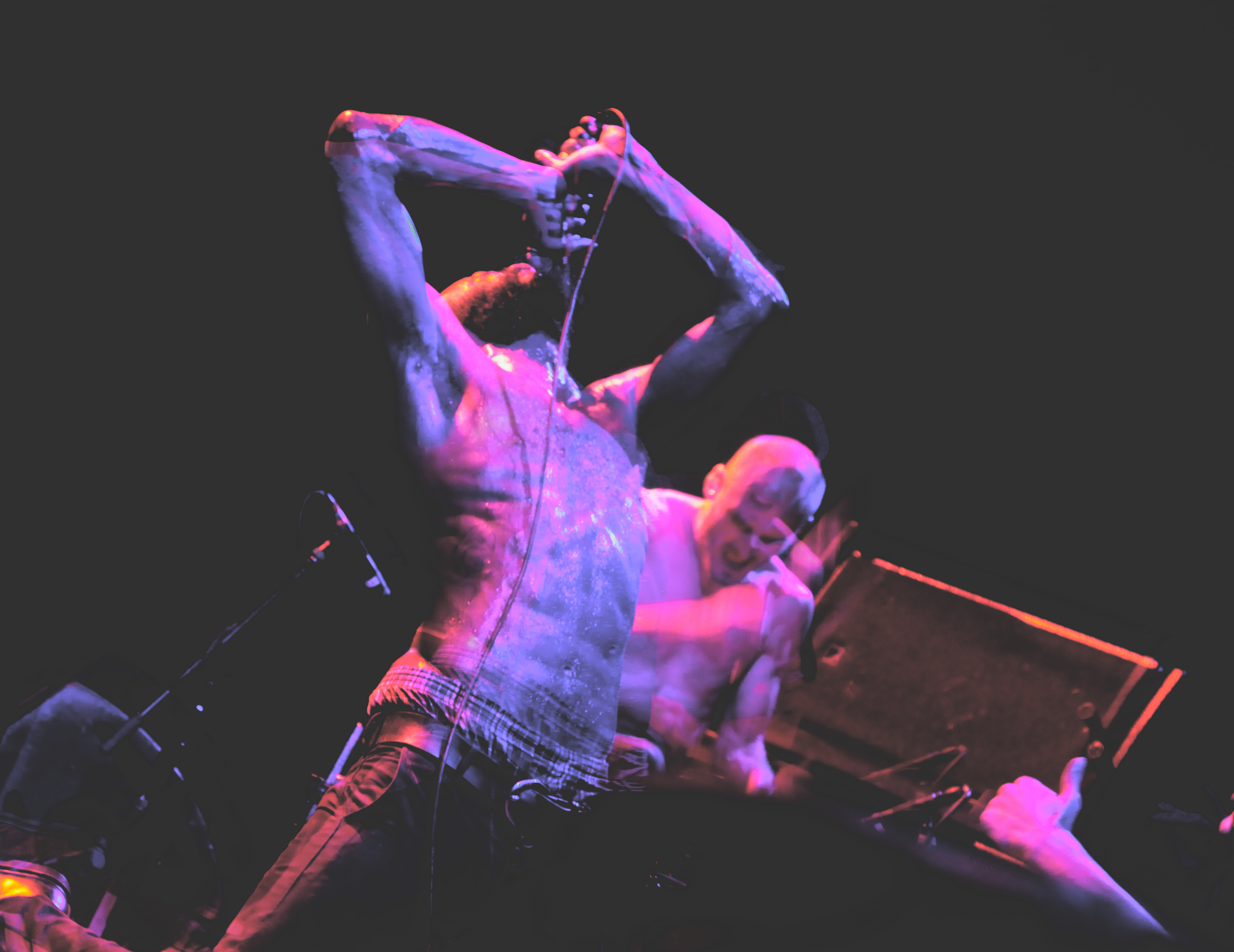
- Death Grips performing in New York City, November 2012
- Studio albums: 7
- EPs: 4
- Compilation albums: 2
- Music videos: 47
- Mixtapes: 1
- Singles: 19
- Guest Appearances: 1
- Remixes: 3

American band Death Grips has released seven studio albums, two compilation albums, four extended plays (EPs), one mixtape, six non-album singles, 16 album singles, three remixes, one guest appearance and 47 music videos. The band was formed by MC Ride, Zach Hill, and Andy Morin in Sacramento, California, during the winter of 2010.

In March 2011, Death Grips released its eponymous debut EP. The band's mixtape Exmilitary followed a month later and was praised by contemporary music critics. Death Grips signed a record deal with Epic Records in early 2012 and its debut studio album The Money Store was released in April to critical acclaim, peaking at number 130 on the Billboard 200 chart. Because Epic Records would not confirm a release date for their second studio album No Love Deep Web before 2013, Death Grips self-released the album in October 2012. As a result of this and the ensuing conflict between the band and the record label, Death Grips was dropped by Epic Records. No Love Deep Web received positive reviews and topped the BitTorrent list of most-legally downloaded music, with 34,151,432 downloads.

In July 2013, Death Grips launched Third Worlds, an imprint label of Harvest Records. The band made their subsequent releases on this label. Their third album, Government Plates, was released in November 2013, to favorable reviews. Death Grips' fourth studio album, The Powers That B, is a double album consisting of two discs titled Niggas on the Moon and Jenny Death. In June 2014, Niggas on the Moon was released. Between the releases of the two halves of this double album, the instrumental album Fashion Week was released in January 2015. The second half, Jenny Death was highly anticipated and the complete double album was released in March 2015 to positive reviews, peaking at number 72 on the Billboard 200 chart. The Powers That B was followed by an instrumental EP titled Interview 2016, released in March 2016.

In May 2016, Death Grips released their fifth studio album, Bottomless Pit, which was met with positive reviews and peaked at number 193 on the Billboard 200 chart. The physical vinyl release of the compilation album Fashion Week/Interview 2016 was released in November of that year. In March 2018, Death Grips released the title for its sixth studio album, Year of the Snitch, which was released in June 2018.

== Albums ==
=== Studio albums ===
List of studio albums, with details, selected chart positions, and sales
| Title | Details | Peak chart positions | | | | | | | | |
| Title | Details | US | US Alt. | US Heat. | US Indie | US Rap | US Rock | NLD Vinyl | UK | UK R&B |
|---|---|---|---|---|---|---|---|---|---|---|
| The Money Store | Released: April 15, 2012; Label: Epic; Formats: Digital download, CD, LP, CS | 130 | 24 | 3 | — | 14 | 39 | — | 181 | 20 |
| No Love Deep Web | Released: October 1, 2012; Label: Third Worlds, Harvest; Formats: Digital download, CD, LP | — | — | 7 | — | 22 | — | — | — | — |
| Government Plates | Released: November 13, 2013; Label: Third Worlds, Harvest; Formats: Digital download, LP | — | — | — | — | — | — | — | — | — |
| The Powers That B | Released: March 31, 2015; Label: Third Worlds, Harvest; Formats: Digital download, CD, LP | 72 | 9 | — | 4 | 8 | 15 | — | 150 | 11 |
| Bottomless Pit | Released: May 6, 2016; Label: Third Worlds, Harvest; Formats: Digital download, CD, LP, CS | 193 | 14 | — | 13 | — | 21 | — | — | 24 |
| Year of the Snitch | Released: June 22, 2018; Label: Third Worlds, Harvest; Formats: Digital download, CD, LP, CS | 97 | 10 | — | 32 | — | 16 | 23 | — | 12 |
"—" denotes a recording that did not chart or was not released in that territory.

=== Mixtapes ===
List of mixtapes, with details
| Title | Details |
|---|---|
| Exmilitary | Released: April 26, 2011; Label: Self-released; Formats: Digital download, CD, LP, CS |

=== Instrumental albums ===
List of instrumental albums, with details
| Title | Details |
|---|---|
| Fashion Week | Released: January 4, 2015; Label: Third Worlds; Format: Digital download |

=== Compilation albums ===
List of compilation albums, with details
| Title | Details |
|---|---|
| Fashion Week/Interview 2016 (Black Friday 2016) | Released: November 25, 2016; Label: Third Worlds, Harvest; Format: 2×LP |
| Steroids (Crouching Tiger Hidden Gabber Megamix) (Record Store Day 2019) | Released: April 13, 2019; Label: Third Worlds, Harvest; Format: LP |

== EPs ==
List of extended plays, with details
| Title | Details |
|---|---|
| Death Grips | Released: March 8, 2011; Label: Self-released; Format: Digital download |
| Interview 2016 | Released: March 22, 2016; Label: Self-released; Format: Digital download, CS |
| Steroids (Crouching Tiger Hidden Gabber Megamix) | Released: May 22, 2017; Label: Third Worlds; Formats: Digital download |
| Gmail and the Restraining Orders | Released: June 21, 2019 January 27, 2021 (Streaming); Label: Third Worlds; Format: Streamed Audio |

== Singles ==
List of singles, showing details and album name
| Title | Release | Album |
|---|---|---|
| "Full Moon (Death Classic)" | 2011 | Death Grips |
| "Guillotine" | 2011 | Exmilitary |
| "Poser Killer" / "Fyrd Up" | 2011 | Live from Death Valley |
| "Blackjack" | 2012 | The Money Store |
| "Get Got" | 2012 | The Money Store |
| "Lost Boys" | 2012 | The Money Store |
| "The Fever (Aye Aye)" | 2012 | The Money Store |
| "I've Seen Footage" | 2012 | The Money Store |
| "@deathgripz" | 2012 | Adult Swim Singles Program 2012 |
| "No Love" | 2013 | No Love Deep Web |
| "Birds" | 2013 | Government Plates |
| "Inanimate Sensation" | 2015 | The Powers That B |
| "Hot Head" | 2016 | Bottomless Pit |
| "Black Paint" | 2018 | Year of the Snitch |
| "Flies" | 2018 | Year of the Snitch |
| "Streaky" | 2018 | Year of the Snitch |
| "Hahaha" | 2018 | Year of the Snitch |
| "Shitshow" | 2018 | Year of the Snitch |
| "More Than the Fairy" (featuring Les Claypool) | 2021 | Non-album singles |
| "True Vulture" | 2023 | Non-album singles |
| "The Bug Death Grips FULL MIXX" | 2023 | Non-album singles |
| "Electronic Drum Solo Dub Mix (Single Take)" | 2023 | Non-album singles |

== Guest appearances ==
List of guest appearances, showing year released, other performers, and album name
| Title | Year | Other performer | Album |
|---|---|---|---|
| "Fuck a Bitch" | 2014 | The Bug | Angels & Devils |

== Remixes ==
List of remixes, showing year released, original artist, and album name
| Remixed track | Year | Artist | Album(s) |
|---|---|---|---|
| "Sacrifice" | 2012 | Björk | Biophilia Remix Series; Bastards |
| "Thunderbolt" | 2012 | Björk | Biophilia Remix Series; Bastards |
| "Firestarter" | 2013 | The Prodigy | Non-album release |

== Music videos ==
List of music videos, showing year released and director(s)
| Title | Year | Director(s) |
|---|---|---|
| "Full Moon (Death Classic)" | 2011 | Death Grips |
| "Lord of the Game"; (featuring Mexican Girl) | 2011 | Death Grips |
| "Culture Shock" | 2011 | Death Grips |
| "Guillotine (It Goes Yah)" | 2011 | Matt Brown |
| "Spread Eagle Cross the Block" | 2011 | Terroreyes |
| "Takyon (Death Yon)" (Note: When asked "Is 'Takyon' in reference to the hypothetical sub-atomic particle by the same name, purported to travel faster than the speed of light?" Morin responded "Yeah. We're very into science. 'Takyon' is in reference to the particle, and in-song, it's a metaphor representing the sensation of either becoming that particle or harnessing its energy.") | 2011 | Death Grips |
| "Beware" | 2011 | Death Grips |
| "Known for It" | 2011 | Death Grips |
| "Blackjack" | 2012 | Unknown |
| "Get Got" | 2012 | Unknown |
| "The Fever (Aye Aye)" | 2012 | Unknown |
| "I've Seen Footage" | 2012 | WeAre From L.A. |
| "Hustle Bones" | 2012 | Death Grips |
| "Double Helix" | 2012 | Death Grips |
| "World of Dogs" | 2012 | Unknown |
| "True Vulture" | 2012 | Galen Pehrson |
| "Come Up and Get Me" | 2013 | Zach Hill; Stefan Burnett |
| "Lock Your Doors Music Video (No Hands 6)" | 2013 | Unknown |
| "You Might Think He Loves You for Your Money But I Know What He Really Loves You for It's Your Brand New Leopard Skin Pillbox Hat" | 2013 | Unknown |
| "Anne Bonny" | 2013 | Unknown |
| "Two Heavens" | 2013 | Unknown |
| "This Is Violence Now (Don't Get Me Wrong)" | 2013 | Unknown |
| "Birds" | 2013 | Unknown |
| "Feels Like a Wheel" | 2013 | Unknown |
| "I'm Overflow" | 2013 | Unknown |
| "Big House" | 2013 | Unknown |
| "Government Plates" | 2013 | Unknown |
| "Bootleg (Don't Need Your Help)" | 2013 | Unknown |
| "Whatever I Want (Fuck Who's Watching)" | 2013 | Unknown |
| "No Love" | 2014 | Death Grips |
| "Inanimate Sensation" | 2014 | Unknown |
| "On GP" | 2015 | |
| "On GP (Official Video)" | 2015 | Death Grips |
| "I Break Mirrors with My Face in the United States" | 2015 | Unknown |
| "The Powers That B" | 2015 | Unknown |
| "Interview 2016" | 2016 | Sean Metelerkamp |
| "Giving Bad People Good Ideas" | 2016 | Death Grips |
| "Eh" | 2016 | Sean Metelerkamp |
| "Streaky" | 2018 | |
| "Flies" | 2018 | |
| "Dilemma" | 2018 | |
| "Shitshow" | 2018 | Zach Hill; Galen Pehrson |
| "Death Grips Is Online" | 2018 | |
