= Flies (song) =

Single by Death Grips

from the album Year of the Snitch
- Released: May 22, 2018
- Genre: Experimental hip hop
- Length: 2:33
- Label: Harvest Records; Third Worlds
- Songwriters: Zach Hill; Stefan Burnett

Death Grips singles chronology
| "Black Paint" (2018) | "Flies" (2018) | "Hahaha" (2018) |

"Flies" is a song by experimental hip hop group Death Grips. It was released as a single from their sixth studio album Year of the Snitch, on May 22, 2018, through Third Worlds, an imprint of Harvest Records.

== Release ==
On May 22, 2018, Death Grips shared "Flies" on social media. The song was released with an accompanying music video. "Flies" contains samples of three previously released songs by the band: "I've Seen Footage" and "System Blower" from The Money Store and "Spread Eagle Cross the Block" from Exmilitary.

== Reception ==
"Flies" received generally positive reviews from critics upon its release. Writing for Consequence of Sound, Randall Colburn described the song as "[evoking] a swarm of winged creatures, its spastic beat underscoring whirring synths, colorful drones, and MC Ride’s trademark bark." Jake Boyer of Highsnobiety commended "Flies" for "offering [Death Grips'] usual potent blend of visceral hardcore electro with a heart of utter darkness".
