= Guillotine (Death Grips song) =

2011 song by Death Grips

Single by Death Grips

from the album Exmilitary
- Released: August 3, 2011
- Recorded: 2011
- Genre: Industrial hip-hop; rap rock; alternative hip-hop
- Length: 3:43
- Label: Self-released
- Songwriters: Andy Morin; Stefan Burnett; Zach Hill
- Producers: Andy Morin; Zach Hill

Death Grips singles chronology
| "Live from Death Valley" (2011) | "Guillotine" (2011) | "Blackjack" (2012) |

Music video
- "Guillotine" on YouTube

"Guillotine (It Goes Yah)" is a song by American alternative hip-hop band Death Grips, released as the lead single from their debut mixtape, Exmilitary. It was released on August 3, 2011.

== Release ==
The music video for "Guillotine" was self-released by Death Grips on YouTube on April 26, 2011, as the lead single of their debut mixtape Exmilitary. It was eventually released as a single on iTunes on August 3, 2011.

== Music video ==
The music video for "Guillotine" was shot by Matt Brown and features Death Grips' frontman MC Ride angrily rapping while riding in a car, with the visuals becoming increasingly corrupted by white noise. Zach Hill, the drummer for Death Grips, said in 2012 that it "made total sense to start filming in a car" as "Guillotine" is an "anxiety-fuelled" and "claustrophobic" song.

== Critical reception ==
"Guillotine" was met with positive reviews by critics. John Calvert of The Quietus named the single as the stand-out song from Exmilitary. In July 2014, Complex ranked it as the third best Death Grips song, noting MC Ride's loud and aggressive vocal delivery as "confrontational". Hayley Elizabeth Kaufman of Flaunt called "Guillotine" a "sinister slice-and-dice track".

The Atlantic called it a, "leering, shuddering, articulated beast of a song. In their desperate prime, Sacramento’s Death Grips seemed to have cornered the market on free-roaming insanity. Public-transport mutterings, cell-block din, oracular street rants, profane telepathic zaps, hissed rebuttals to the unheard voice: All were gleefully enfolded into their punky-clunky emergency hip-hop."

== In popular culture ==
In 2013, choirmaster and broadcaster Gareth Malone performed a choir cover of "Guillotine" for his debut studio album Voices. In April 2019, Icelandic singer Björk played the song during a performance at a school dance in Iceland.

On November 11, 2021, a group of vigilante hackers defaced the Constitutional Court of Thailand's website homepage with the music video, also changing the website name to "kangaroo court". This action was done to protest the Constitutional Court's rulings against pro-democracy activists who were seeking to reform or overthrow the monarchy.

== See also ==
- 2011 in hip-hop
