= Year of the Snitch =

Studio album by Death Grips
- Released: June 22, 2018
- Recorded: 2017–2018
- Studio: Sunset Sound
- Genres: Punk rap; noise rock
- Length: 37:13
- Labels: Third Worlds; Harvest
- Producers: Zach Hill; Andy Morin (co.)

Death Grips chronology
Steroids (Crouching Tiger Hidden Gabber Megamix) (2017)	Year of the Snitch (2018)	Gmail and the Restraining Orders (2019)

Death Grips studio album chronology
Bottomless Pit (2016)	Year of the Snitch (2018)

Singles from Year of the Snitch
- 1. "Streaky" Released: May 5, 2018; 2. "Black Paint" Released: May 15, 2018; 3. "Flies" Released: May 22, 2018; 4. "Hahaha" Released: June 7, 2018; 5. "Shitshow" Released: June 17, 2018

Year of the Snitch is the sixth studio album by experimental hip hop group Death Grips, released on June 22, 2018, through Third Worlds and Harvest Records.

== Background ==
With the release of Steroids (Crouching Tiger Hidden Gabber Megamix), Death Grips announced they were "working on the new Death Grips album". The band shared via social media that they had been working on the album with new collaborators, including Australian experimental musician Lucas Abela, New Zealand film director Andrew Adamson, and Justin Chancellor, bassist for the progressive rock band Tool.

The band posted a black and white image of text reading "Year of the Snitch - new album coming soon..." on their official webpage on March 22, 2018. Death Grips shared the album artwork for Year of the Snitch on April 6, 2018. The band's imprint label Third Worlds' website was also updated with this information.

The tracklist for the album was released on April 11, through a video posted to social media and the band's YouTube channel. The video consisted of the track names being sent via SMS to the user of an iPhone through a screen recorder, while short videos played in the foreground. Accompanying the differing ringtones, screamed vocals of the band's frontman MC Ride can be heard, coming from the album's last track, "Disappointed".

Death Grips uploaded a music video for the track "Streaky" on their YouTube channel on May 5, 2018, as the album's first single, followed by the track "Black Paint" on May 15, and the music video for the third album single, "Flies", on May 22.

The band posted a short video to Instagram on May 23, featuring DJ Swamp performing on a turntable in a recording studio, with the caption stating that "the majority of Year of the Snitch features [him]".

The fourth single, "Hahaha", was uploaded by the band to their YouTube page on June 7. That same day, the album's release date was announced as June 22. A music video for the track "Dilemma" featuring Andrew Adamson was uploaded on the Death Grips YouTube channel on June 15. A fifth single, "Shitshow", was uploaded to YouTube two days later. Three days later, on June 20, the official video for "Shitshow" was released. It was directed by Zach Hill and Galen Pehrson. The video for "Shitshow" would later be removed from YouTube for violating community guidelines.

=== Interpretations ===
The band has been notorious for their invocation of infamous cult-leader Charles Manson, stemming from their sampling of his voice in their debut mixtape Exmilitary. Prior to the album's release, the title "Year of the Snitch" was speculated to be a reference to the 69th birthday of Manson Family member-turned-key witness Linda Kasabian. This theory is supported by the album's release date on June 22, one day after Kasabian's birthday, as well as the fourth track "Linda's in Custody", which seems to allude to her role in the Tate-LeBianca murders.

== Critical reception ==
Professional ratings
Aggregate scores
Source	Rating
AnyDecentMusic?	7.3/10
Metacritic	69/100
Review scores
Source	Rating
The 405	7.5/10
AllMusic	3.5/5 stars
Highsnobiety	4.0/5
The Line of Best Fit	8/10
The Music	3.5/5 stars
MusicOMH	4/5 stars
Pitchfork	7.3/10
PopMatters	7/10
RapReviews	6/10
Rolling Stone	3/5 stars

According to the review aggregator Metacritic, Year of the Snitch received "generally favorable reviews" based on a weighted average score of 69 out of 100 from eight critic scores. In his review for AllMusic, Rob Wacey claimed that "Not one of their releases is the same as another, and with Year of the Snitch, they continue to break boundaries and expectations. The record is another example of true experimentation with their sound along with an uncompromising work ethic and a thirst for originality." Writing for The Line of Best Fit, Steven Loftin called the band "one of the more exciting bands currently active" and described the album as "pushing every boundary around them". Ian Cohen of Pitchfork called the album "explosive" and "fun as hell", but "lacking in a clear target to give it meaning".

Christopher R. Weingarten of Rolling Stone named the song "Black Paint" as his 2018 pick for the magazine's "song of the summer" series.

== Track listing ==
All tracks are written by Stefan Burnett and Zach Hill, unless otherwise noted.

No.	Title	Writer(s)	Length
1.	"Death Grips Is Online"	Burnett; Hill; Andy Morin	3:32
2.	"Flies"		2:33
3.	"Black Paint"		3:49
4.	"Linda's in Custody"		3:30
5.	"The Horn Section"	Hill	1:32
6.	"Hahaha"		3:35
7.	"Shitshow"		1:45
8.	"Streaky"		2:56
9.	"Dilemma"	Burnett; Hill; Morin	3:54
10.	"Little Richard"	Hill	2:25
11.	"The Fear"	Burnett; Hill; Morin	3:21
12.	"Outro"	Hill	1:02
13.	"Disappointed"		3:21
Total length:			37:15

Notes

- "Hahaha" was spelled "Ha Ha Ha" in early publications before the single's release.

== Personnel ==
Credits according to liner notes.

Death Grips

- Stefan Burnett – vocals, lyrics
- Zach Hill – drums, production, vocals on "Little Richard", lyrics
- Andy Morin – keyboards, co-production, recording engineer, lyrics

Additional personnel

- DJ Swamp – turntables on all tracks except "Little Richard", "Outro" and "Disappointed"
- Andrew Adamson – spoken word intro on "Dilemma"
- Justin Chancellor – bass on "Disappointed"
- Justice Yeldham – glass on “Death Grips Is Online” and “Outro”

== Charts ==
Chart (2018)	Peak position
US Billboard 200	97
US Top Alternative Albums (Billboard)	10
US Top Rock Albums (Billboard)	16
