= Bottomless Pit (album) =

Studio album by Death Grips
- Released: May 6, 2016
- Recorded: 2015–2016
- Studio: Sunset Sound Recorders
- Genres: Industrial hip-hop; digital hardcore
- Length: 39:20
- Labels: Third Worlds; Harvest
- Producer: Death Grips

Death Grips chronology
Interview 2016 (2016)	Bottomless Pit (2016)	Steroids (Crouching Tiger Hidden Gabber Megamix) (2017)

Death Grips studio album chronology
The Powers That B (2015)	Bottomless Pit (2016)	Year of the Snitch (2018)

Singles from Bottomless Pit
- 1. "Hot Head" Released: February 6, 2016

Bottomless Pit is the fifth studio album by experimental hip-hop group Death Grips, released on May 6, 2016, through Third Worlds and Harvest Records.

== Background ==
On October 21, 2015, the group uploaded a video to their YouTube page titled Bottomless Pit. It features footage from 2013 of the late American actress Karen Black reciting lines from a film script that Death Grips drummer Zach Hill wrote months before her death. They also posted on their website and Facebook page that this would be the title for their upcoming fifth official studio album. Later, on December 16, the group posted a tweet containing the phrase "it won't lit", eventually revealed to be a lyric from the Bottomless Pit track "BB Poison".

On February 6, 2016, Death Grips released the song "Hot Head" from their upcoming album onto their SoundCloud and YouTube accounts. The cover art and tracklisting were then revealed on March 18, followed on April 19 by the announcement of a May 6 release date and a download link for a document containing lyrics for each track on the album.

On April 29, 2016, the album was leaked in its entirety from the band's SoundCloud page.

== Critical reception ==
Professional ratings
Aggregate scores
Source	Rating
AnyDecentMusic?	7.9/10
Metacritic	80/100
Review scores
Source	Rating
AllMusic	4/5 stars
The Austin Chronicle	3/5 stars
Consequence of Sound	B
DIY	4/5 stars
Exclaim!	8/10
Pitchfork	8.1/10
PopMatters	8/10
Rolling Stone	4/5 stars
Spin	8/10
State	4/5

According to the review aggregator Metacritic, Bottomless Pit received "generally favorable reviews" based on a weighted average score of 80 out of 100 from 11 critic scores.

Pitchfork wrote, "On their new album 'Bottomless Pit', they stitch together one of their most cohesive grotesques ever, renewing their focus on songcraft, rather than chicanery." Pretty Much Amazing described the album as "the best release from one of the most exciting artists of the 2010s", while PopMatters stated, "Bottomless Pit will clearly not be for all hip-hop or punk fans, but it is impossible to deny that this album, just like the rest of the trio's catalog, is doing a much-needed service to both genres by experimenting with them in unimaginable ways."

Rolling Stone ranked Bottomless Pit as the 50th best album of 2016.

== In media ==
"Hot Head" was first used in a second season teaser for Animals. The track was also used in "Alligator Man", the first episode of the second season of Atlanta. "Bubbles Buried in This Jungle" was used in "Parce Domine", the first episode and "Genre", the fifth episode of the third season of the television series Westworld.

== Track listing ==
All tracks are written by Death Grips.

No.	Title	Length
1.	"Giving Bad People Good Ideas"	3:07
2.	"Hot Head"	4:18
3.	"Spikes"	3:05
4.	"Warping"	2:54
5.	"Eh"	2:52
6.	"Bubbles Buried in This Jungle"	2:40
7.	"Trash"	2:52
8.	"Houdini"	2:44
9.	"BB Poison"	3:06
10.	"Three Bedrooms in a Good Neighborhood"	3:03
11.	"Ring a Bell"	2:26
12.	"80808"	3:16
13.	"Bottomless Pit"	2:55
Total length:		39:20

Notes

- "Giving Bad People Good Ideas" contains vocals from Clementine Creevy. This marked the first time another vocalist appeared on a Death Grips project since Mexican Girl on 2011's Exmilitary.
- "Hot Head" on the album has very slight changes to the instrumental compared to the original single release; it contains a different intro, the addition of a bass guitar, and is mixed lower than the original.
- The music video for "Eh" was removed from YouTube. It was later readded.

== Personnel ==
Credits adapted from the liner notes of Bottomless Pit.

Death Grips

- Zach Hill – drums, production
- Andy Morin – keyboards, production
- Stefan Burnett – vocals

Additional personnel

- Clementine Creevy – vocals (track 1)
- Nick Reinhart – guitar (all tracks), bass guitar (track 2)
- Geoff Neal – engineering
- Morgan Stratton – engineering

== Charts ==
Chart (2016)	Peak position
US Billboard 200	193
