= Justice Yeldham =

Australian noise musician

Lucas "Granpa" Abela
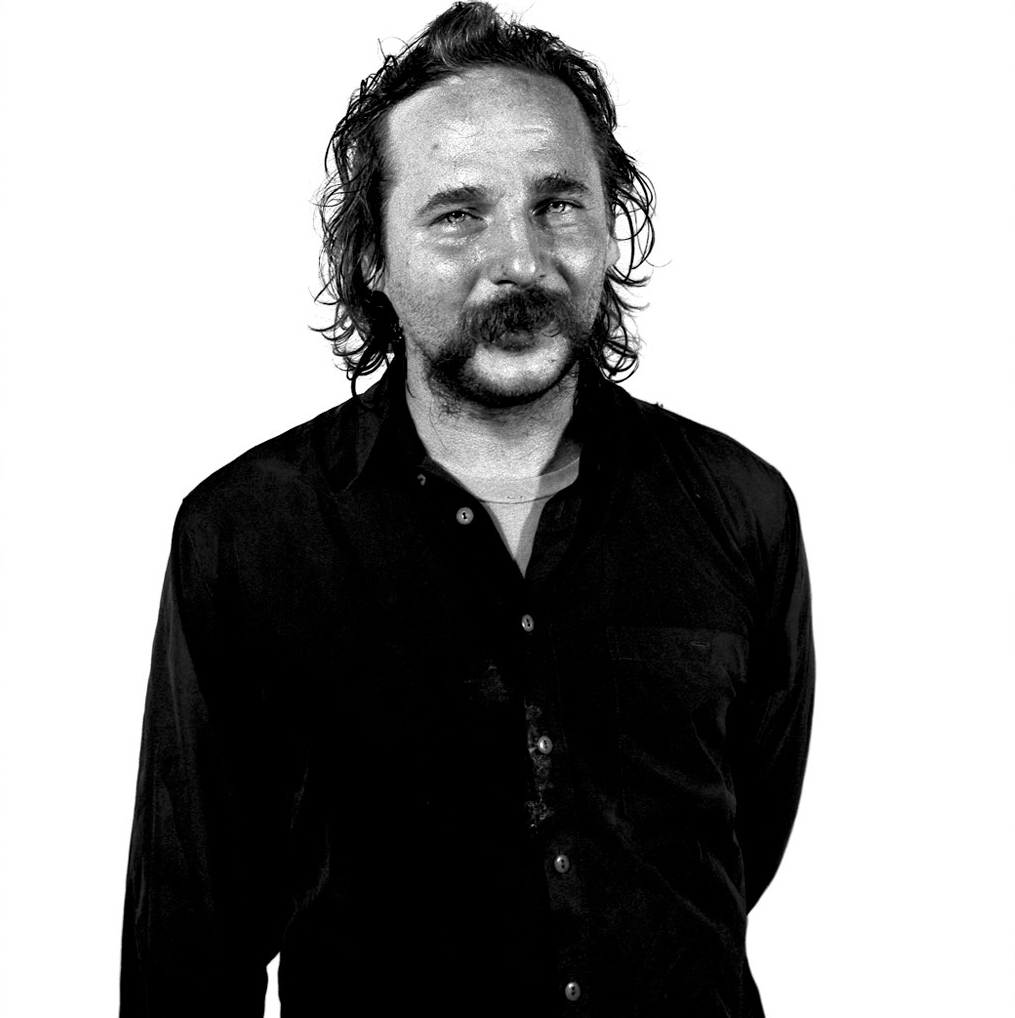
- Abela after a Justice Yeldham show in Paris, France, 2008

Background information
- Also known as: Justice Yeldham; Lucas "Granpa" Abela
- Born: Lucas Abela; 7 May 1972 (age 54); Gold Coast, Queensland, Australia
- Genres: Noise; harsh noise; experimental; avant-garde; danger music; free improvisation; free jazz; electronic; turntablism
- Occupation: Musician
- Years active: 1995–present
- Labels: Dual Plover; Load Records

Lucas "Granpa" Abela (born 7 May 1972), also known by the stage name Justice Yeldham, is an Australian noise musician. He is most famous for creating an instrument made from a diamond-shaped pane of glass, fitted with contact microphones and attached to effects pedals. During live shows, he manipulates and breaks the glass with his mouth, often receiving cuts in the process and leaving his face and the instrument smeared in blood. NME described his live shows as "crossing the line between music and bloodsport". Despite being classified as a noise artist, Abela sees himself as an improvisational musician in the free jazz tradition.

Abela began his music career in Sydney in the 1990s as a DJ and turntablist. Realising that any metal tip can carry sound, he began replacing the record needles with objects such as pins, knives and skewers, and soon moved on to building his own phonographs with recycled electric motors. Abela's experimentations attracted the attention of Australian musicians Oren Ambarchi and Mike Avenaim, who helped launch his career as a touring musician. Abela discovered the musical potential of glass in 2003 when he found broken glass among building rubble in Chippendale, Sydney. He attached a microphone to one end of the glass, then started blowing on the surface. He later said: "I was really taken how just kind of crystal clear the resonance was as opposed to the resonance within metal, ... Finding glass was a hallelujah moment." Performing as Justice Yeldham, he toured the world extensively with his glass instrument, garnering a wide array of reactions due to the graphic and dangerous nature of his live shows. One journalist described the sound that Abela achieves with the instrument as "like a distorted guitar laid over a harmony of dying cats." In regards to bleeding on stage due to cuts from the glass, Abela says, "I'm never even conscious that I've cut myself until after the show when someone says 'You’d better clean yourself up.' It’s like the playing is an out of body experience in which I never feel pain."

In 2017, Justice Yeldham began collaborating with American experimental hip hop group Death Grips. He features on the band's 2018 album Year of the Snitch.

== Discography ==
As Justice Yeldham

- And the Drummer Who Shall Remain Nameless (2007)
- Cicatrix (2007)
- Birthdays (2008)
- Justice Yeldham (2012)
- Never (2023)
