= Crime in Choir =

American progressive rock band (2000–2009)

Crime In Choir
- Origin: San Francisco, California
- Genres: Instrumental; Experimental; Progressive rock Math Rock
- Years active: 2000 – 2009
- Labels: Omnibus, Frenetic, Moorworks, Gold Standard Labs
- Members: Kenny Hopper; Jesse Reiner; Jarrett Wrenn; Tim Soete; Matt Waters; Jonathan Skaggs; Warren Huegel
- Past members: Zach Hill; Ian Hill; Carson McWhirter; Jeff Hunt

San Francisco quintet Crime In Choir was an instrumental progressive rock band. Founded in 2000, Crime In Choir released their previous full-length releases on Frenetic Records (2004's The Hoop) and Omnibus (2002's self-titled debut), respectively. The band's third full-length, Trumpery Metier, was recorded by Tim Green, and is their first release for Gold Standard Labs. The band includes two original members of At the Drive-In, guitarist Jarrett Wrenn and bassist Kenny Hopper.

On September 13, 2007, Crime in Choir performed at the San Francisco Museum of Modern Art accompanied by light projections by visual artist, Anthony McCall.

Crime in Choir's fourth release, "Gift Givers" was released on 22 January 2009 on Kill Shaman Records - their previous label (Gold Standard Labs) closed its doors in October 2007.

Recent projects (2026) include, Long Twins on Hidden Harmony Recordings, featuring Kenny Hopper and New Scenery featuring Jesse Reiner.

== Current members ==
- Kenny Hopper - Rhodes piano, bass guitar
- Jesse Reiner - synthesizers (Moog and analog)
- Jarrett Wrenn - electric guitar, baritone guitar
- Warren Huegel - drums
- Matt Waters - saxophone
- Jonathan Skaggs - bass guitar
- Tim Green - Guitar

== Former members ==
- Zach Hill - drums
- Ian Hill - drums
- Carson McWhirter - bass, electric guitar, keyboards
- Jeff Hunt - bass, Dan Electro baritone guitar
- Jay Pellicci - Drums

== Discography ==
- Crime in Choir — 2002 (Omnibus)
- The Hoop — 2004 (Frenetic) 2005 (Moorworks, Japan)
- Trumpery Metier — 2006 (Gold Standard Labs)
- Gift Givers - 2009 (Kill Shaman)
