= Death Grips (EP) =

EP by Death Grips
- Released: March 8, 2011
- Genre: Experimental hip hop
- Length: 24:58
- Label: Self-released
- Producer: Death Grips

Death Grips chronology
Death Grips (2011)	Exmilitary (2011)

Death Grips EP chronology
Death Grips (2011)	Interview 2016 (2016)

Singles from Death Grips
- 1. "Full Moon (Death Classic)" Released: April 27, 2011

Death Grips is the debut extended play by experimental hip hop group Death Grips. It was released on March 8, 2011, as a free download directly from the group's website in ZIP file format.

== Background ==
After forming on December 21, 2010, in Sacramento, California, Death Grips released their first song "Full Moon (Death Classic)" on March 8, 2011, along with a music video and a free self-titled EP. The EP consists of six tracks, the latter three of which would appear the following month on their debut mixtape, Exmilitary.

Following the release of Exmilitary on April 25, 2011, the EP was removed from the band's website, although "Full Moon (Death Classic)" and "Face Melter (How To Do Impossible Things)" remained available for a short time. "Full Moon (Death Classic)" was released as the band's debut single on April 27, 2011, and was the only song from the EP still available on streaming services and for digital download. However, in February 2023, the majority of Death Grips’ discography was made available for free download on the Third Worlds website, which included a copy of the EP without the tracks rereleased on Exmilitary.

== Track listing ==
The EP was originally distributed in a ZIP file with no tracklist metadata; as a result, the tracklist below is sorted by alphabetical order.

Track listing
No.	Title	Length
1.	"Death Grips (Next Grips)"	4:21
2.	"Face Melter (How to Do Impossible Things)"	3:30
3.	"Full Moon (Death Classic)"	3:49
4.	"Known For It (Freak Grips)^{[a]}^{[b]}"	4:14
5.	"Takyon (Death Yon)^{[a]}"	2:50
6.	"Where's It At (Death Heated)^{[a]}^{[c]}"	6:14
Total length:		24:58

Notes

- ^{^[a]} Later rereleased on Exmilitary. Omitted from the version released as a free download by the band in 2023.
- ^{^[b]} Name shortened to "Known For It" on Exmilitary.
- ^{^[c]} Renamed to "I Want It I Need It (Death Heated)" on Exmilitary.

== Personnel ==
- MC Ride – vocals
- Zach Hill – drums, production
- Andy Morin – keyboards, programming, production

Additional personnel

- Mexican Girl – backing vocals on "Death Grips (Next Grips)"
