= Government Plates =

Studio album by Death Grips
- Released: November 13, 2013
- Genres: Experimental hip hop; industrial; deconstructed club; glitch hop
- Length: 35:42
- Labels: Third Worlds; Harvest
- Producer: Death Grips

Death Grips chronology
No Love Deep Web (2012)	Government Plates (2013)	The Powers That B (2015)

Singles from Government Plates
- 1. "Birds" Released: August 21, 2013

Alternative Record Store Day vinyl cover

Government Plates is the third studio album by experimental hip hop group Death Grips. It was released for free download on November 13, 2013. It was also uploaded by the band to multiple file sharing sites, and music videos for every song were uploaded to the band's YouTube page. On January 14, 2014, Government Plates was made available for purchase through iTunes. The album has sold over 13,000 copies as of March 2015.

== Background ==
On May 10, 2013, it was announced that Death Grips drummer Zach Hill was working on a third Death Grips studio album while writing, directing, and scoring a film. On July 8, it was announced that Death Grips had launched their own record label, Third Worlds. The label was created through "a unique relationship with Harvest/Capitol" with a deal to be distributed by Caroline Records. It was also revealed that the album would be released the following year. On August 21, the album's only single "Birds" was made available for free download. The song is notably built around a heavily edited sample of a guitar riff played by English actor Robert Pattinson, who used Hill's iPhone to record it.

== Release ==
On November 13, 2013, Death Grips posted Government Plates on several websites for free download without any forewarning. Subsequently, they released music videos for all eleven tracks on YouTube and streamed the full album on SoundCloud. The album was released exactly 13 months, 13 days, and 13 hours after their previous album, No Love Deep Web. The album was released to iTunes and Spotify on January 14, 2014.

On November 28, 2014, 900 vinyl copies of Government Plates were released for Record Store Day Black Friday, containing new artwork and a physical replica of the license plate on the cover.

== Critical reception ==
Professional ratings
Aggregate scores
Source	Rating
AnyDecentMusic?	7.6/10
Metacritic	75/100
Review scores
Source	Rating
Consequence of Sound	2.5/5 stars
DIY	4/5 stars
Drowned in Sound	8/10
Fact	3.5/5
NME	8/10
Pitchfork	8.4/10
PopMatters	8/10
Rolling Stone	3.5/5 stars
Slant Magazine	4/5 stars
Spin	8/10

According to the review aggregator Metacritic, Government Plates received "generally favorable reviews" based on a weighted average score of 75 out of 100 from 18 critic scores. Ian Cohen of Pitchfork awarded the album "Best New Music", writing: "Government Plates loudly reestablishes Death Grips as a group freed by having no ideals whatsoever, making music without a past about a present with no future." Chase Woodruff of Slant Magazine gave the album a positive review, stating: "Government Plates doesn't budge an inch from the vulgar, militant nihilism of 2012's The Money Store or its follow-up, No Love Deep Web." Joe Price of DIY referred to the album as "a sloppy lobotomy of hip-hop focused on provoking fear and intrigue."

The album was placed at 43 on Spin's 50 Best Albums of 2013 list.

However, some critics criticized "the lack of vocals" in the album. Consequence of Sound senior staff writer Dan Caffrey stated, "Although MC Ride's presence is definitely felt, it's more in repeated phrases and abstract vocalizations than the nasty stream-of-consciousness rhymes from other Death Grips releases."

== In other media ==
"You Might Think He Loves You for Your Money but I Know What He Really Loves You for It's Your Brand New Leopard Skin Pillbox Hat" was featured in a 2014 commercial for the Intersport shoe line.

== Track listing ==
All songs written, recorded and produced by Death Grips.

No.	Title	Length
1.	"You Might Think He Loves You for Your Money but I Know What He Really Loves You for It's Your Brand New Leopard-Skin Pill-Box Hat"	2:41
2.	"Anne Bonny"	3:27
3.	"Two Heavens"	3:02
4.	"This Is Violence Now (Don't Get Me Wrong)"	2:38
5.	"Birds"	4:38
6.	"Feels Like a Wheel"	2:22
7.	"I'm Overflow"	3:09
8.	"Big House"	2:19
9.	"Government Plates"	2:42
10.	"Bootleg (Don't Need Your Help)"	2:06
11.	"Whatever I Want (Fuck Who’s Watching)"	6:38
Total length:		35:42

== Personnel ==
Death Grips

- Stefan Burnett
- Zach Hill
- Andy Morin

Additional musicians

- Rob Pattinson – guitar on "Birds"
