= No Love Deep Web =

- Original artwork. The penis is pixelated or covered with a black bar on censored versions of the cover.

Studio album by Death Grips
- Released: October 1, 2012
- Recorded: May–August 2012
- Genres: Experimental hip hop; industrial hip hop
- Length: 45:47
- Labels: Third Worlds; Harvest
- Producer: Death Grips

Death Grips chronology
The Money Store (2012)	No Love Deep Web (2012)	Government Plates (2013)

Alternate cover

No Love Deep Web (Note: Stylised in all caps or as NØ LØVΣ DΣΣP WΠB.) is the second studio album by American experimental hip hop group Death Grips, originally released via their website on October 1, 2012. Recorded from May to August 2012, it exhibited what the group described as a darker, more minimal style, and was leaked by Death Grips themselves due to complications over its release date with their label Epic Records, who subsequently dropped them in November 2012; the album was later made available for purchase via the band's own Third Worlds imprint and Harvest Records.

The album's release was met with strong attention from online magazines largely due to its sexually explicit album cover, which features a picture of an erect penis with the title written across its length. The album received generally favorable reviews from critics, who praised its complexity and stripped-down sound.

== Production ==
=== Background and recording ===
The album was first announced in early 2012 along with the release of two tracks from their album The Money Store, and was originally titled No Love. A sticker was included in the physical release of The Money Store that read: "No Love. Fall 2012." on the reverse side. On April 4, 2012, Death Grips announced dates for an international supporting tour for The Money Store, later adding more to the list. However, shortly after the release of The Money Store, the group cancelled the entire tour so that they could finish the recording of No Love.

Recording of the album took place from May to August 31, 2012, at MC Ride and Zach Hill's apartment in Sacramento, California. On August 12, 2012, Death Grips announced through Pitchfork that the title of the album had been changed to No Love Deep Web and that they had recorded 20 tracks for the album and were narrowing it down to 13 tracks.

=== Style ===
In an interview with Exclaim! the group said that: "No Love is [...] sort of a culmination of our two previous releases." They described the album as "the heaviest thing we've made so far" and "the closest we've gotten to what our initial vision of what Death Grips would sound like." The contents were named as the band's "most future-forward and potent material" with "guitar-driven elements that we touched on with Exmilitary (2011) but [...] aren't exactly being generated by a guitar."

In August 2012, the band told Pitchfork: "there are no manually programmed drums on this album, the beats are being played live on a Roland electronic v-drum set or acoustic drum set by Zach. There are no features, guest collabs or outside producers. The material is cold, bass heavy, minimal, rock and roll influenced and could simultaneously fit into a rave or dance club context. It is essentially rap and electronic music while at times extremely aggressive."

== Promotion ==
To promote No Love Deep Web the group created an alternate reality game (ARG) which ran from August 12–16, 2012, beginning minutes after their release of a statement about the album through Pitchfork. Using the internet as its medium, it mainly employed encrypted archive files hosted on the Tor Network with the filetype .gpg. The game employed many types of encryption through image, text and sound files, including Braille, QR code, Base64, the Caesar cipher, Binary code, Morse code and the Affine cipher, and used websites such as Imgur and various Tor related sites. The game yielded the first mention of the original release date of No Love Deep Web, October 23, 2012, and an unmastered version of The Money Store for download on the first day. On the fifth day, an instrumental version of The Money Store was discovered by users of 4chan on a .onion domain and uploaded for regular download.

Throughout August, the group announced plans for live shows, including a gig at Electric Ballroom, London, and participation in festivals such as the Pitchfork Music Fest Paris and the Big Day Out.

== Release ==
On September 30, 2012, Death Grips announced through their Facebook and Twitter accounts that their record label refused to release the album until "next year sometime" instead of the intended date of October 23, 2012. They then released the track listing and told fans to stay tuned for midnight on October 1. On the next day the band self-released the album through a website posted via Twitter as well as SoundCloud, and various filesharing services including BitTorrent. Later that day, it was revealed that Death Grips topped BitTorrent's "List of Most Legally Downloaded Music" following the release of No Love Deep Web, with 34,151,432 downloads.

Upon its release, No Love Deep Web was met with a swarm of media attention. Several hours after its release, the group's official website was shut down. In an interview, Zach Hill claimed that their record label, Epic, shut it down; however, Epic denied any involvement. The website reappeared shortly after. On October 31, 2012, Death Grips posted confidential emails they received from Epic concerning their copyright infringement on Facebook. The emails, dated October 1, 2012, revealed that Epic planned to receive the original album masters from the group and release the album in stores, but following the leak of the letters, Epic announced that they worked to end their relationship with Death Grips.

On November 19, 2013, No Love Deep Web was released on vinyl and CD through Harvest Records, as well as being made available on streaming services.

In October 2022, in celebration of its 10-year anniversary, the album was reissued as a vinyl release for Record Store Day. The reissued vinyl includes an alternate cover, featuring a shirtless MC Ride standing on the edge of the balcony of their room at the Chateau Marmont in Los Angeles, giving the middle finger with both hands, while holding a cigarette in one of them.

== Artwork and controversy ==
No Love Deep Web was met with controversy related to its album cover, which depicts the image of Zach Hill's erect penis with the album title written across it. The picture was taken in a bathroom at the Chateau Marmont in Los Angeles, where the band stayed for the two months leading up to the leak.

In an interview with Spin, MC Ride responded to the interest by saying, "If you look at that and all you see is a dick, I don't really have anything to say, pretty much. I looked at it and said, 'This is a great photo, and I'd love for this to be the album cover.'" Hill further explained, "It was difficult to do, honestly, in general, it was very difficult. It's difficult even telling people that's the source of it; it feels sacrificial in a sense. That idea existed long before, by the way. This is going to sound funny to other people, but we saw it as tribal, as spiritual, as primal. Also, it comes from a place of being a band that is perceived as...such an aggressive, male-based, by some, misogynistic-seeming band... It's a display of embracing homosexuality, not that either of us are homosexual. Am I making sense? People are still going to think that it's macho, but that's not the source of where it comes from." In a separate interview with Pitchfork, Hill expounded, "It's also a spiritual thing; it's fearlessness...it represents pushing past everything that makes people slaves without even knowing it."

Due to the explicit album artwork, Death Grips placed a disclaimer on their website warning that "US law states you must be 18 years of age to view graphic sexual material. We consider this art." A censored version, replacing the penis with a black bar, was released through their YouTube and SoundCloud channels. Several days after the album's initial release, the group released alternate artwork containing an image of MC Ride wearing tube socks with the words "SUCK MY DICK" printed across the ankle of them.

The 2013 Harvest release features the original artwork packaged in a black slipcase with a disclaimer stating that the artwork is explicit. The slipcase has to be removed before the album cover is shown.

== Reception ==
Professional ratings
Aggregate scores
Source	Rating
AnyDecentMusic?	7.4/10
Metacritic	76/100
Review scores
Source	Rating
AllMusic	4/5 stars
The A.V. Club	C
Beats Per Minute	80%
Consequence of Sound	3.5/5 stars
Fact	4.5/5
MSN Music (Expert Witness)	A−
Now	4/5
Pitchfork	8.2/10
RapReviews	8/10
Tiny Mix Tapes	4/5 stars

According to the review aggregator Metacritic, No Love Deep Web received "generally favorable reviews" based on a weighted average score of 76 out of 100 from 13 critic scores. Grayson Currin, of Pitchfork, gave the album a positive review, stating "loud and punishing, the sonics of No Love Deep Web suit MC Ride's mix of hysteria, rage and exhaustion." John Doran, of BBC Music, also commended the album; while saying that "the record is certainly denser and more difficult to find an entry point into than either of its predecessors," Doran stated "after several listens a handful of stone-cold, diamond-hard gems present themselves from a scree of electronic beats and stentorian rapping/shouting." He also compared the band's sound to that of Autechre.

In a mixed review of the album, Evan Rytlewski of The A.V. Club said "Even at a meaty 46 minutes, the album still suffers from a feeling of writer's block."

== Track listing ==
No.	Title	Length
1.	"Come Up and Get Me"	4:13
2.	"Lil Boy"	3:46
3.	"No Love"	5:04
4.	"Black Dice"	3:27
5.	"World of Dogs"	2:42
6.	"Lock Your Doors"	3:52
7.	"Whammy"	3:09
8.	"Hunger Games"	2:39
9.	"Deep Web"	2:18
10.	"Stockton"	3:17
11.	"Pop"	2:53
12.	"Bass Rattle Stars Out the Sky"	2:27
13.	"Artificial Death in the West"	5:58
Total length:		45:47

== Charts ==
Chart (2012)	Peak position
US Heatseeker Albums	7
US Rap Albums	22
US Tastemaker Albums	16
