= Andrew Adamson =

New Zealand filmmaker (born 1966)

Andrew Adamson MNZM
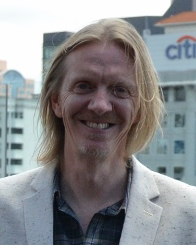
- Adamson in 2013
- Born: 1 December 1966 (age 59); Auckland, New Zealand
- Occupations: Film director; film producer; screenwriter; animator
- Years active: 1990–present
- Notable work: Shrek, The Chronicles of Narnia
- Children: 2

Andrew Ralph Adamson MNZM (born 1 December 1966) is a New Zealand film director, producer, screenwriter, and animator. He is best known for directing the DreamWorks animated film Shrek (2001), which is based on the children's picture book of the same name by American author William Steig and won the first Academy Award for Best Animated Feature at the 74th Academy Awards ceremony, and directing and co-writing Shrek 2 (2004), which was nominated for Academy Award for Best Animated Feature. He also directed and co-wrote the first two live-action film adaptations of C. S. Lewis' The Chronicles of Narnia novels: The Lion, the Witch and the Wardrobe (2005) and Prince Caspian (2008).

== Personal life ==
Adamson's parents were a homemaker and a computer engineer. Born in New Zealand, Adamson moved to Papua New Guinea with his parents when he was eleven years old. He returned to Auckland seven years later. At age 24, he moved to San Francisco, and divided his time between there and Los Angeles. Since making the Narnia films, he has settled back in New Zealand. Adamson has two children.

== Career ==
Adamson wanted to be an architect, but missed a university enrolment deadline because of a car accident. He was recruited by Pacific Data Images to work in the USA. The company opened an office in Los Angeles. There he served as a technical director for (PDI) Toys (1992), starring Robin Williams, and Angels in the Outfield (1994), starring Danny Glover. Previously, Adamson specialised in ads but preferred the idea of telling a story in longer format. He served as visual effects supervisor in the 1995 film Batman Forever, A Time to Kill (1996), and Batman & Robin (1997).

Adamson directed Shrek (the first instalment in the series), based on the 1990 picture book written by William Steig with a modest budget of US$60 million in 2001. However, the film became a worldwide success, taking in nearly $500 million in the box office, including more than $40 million in its opening weekend. The film featured the lead voices of Mike Myers, Eddie Murphy, Cameron Diaz and John Lithgow. The next film in the series, Shrek 2 (2004), had a big Hollywood budget of around $150 million, and was even a bigger success than the first film, taking in more than $900 million worldwide. The film opened to over $100 million, one of the highest openings ever at the time. Adamson directed this film and also wrote the story.

However, he did not direct the next film in the series, Shrek the Third, as he had been contracted by Walden Media to work on The Chronicles of Narnia: The Lion, the Witch and the Wardrobe. Instead, the film was directed by Chris Miller and Raman Hui while Adamson served as executive producer. The script of the film was written by J. David Stem and Joe Stillman. The third film was financially successful, taking in more than $795 million worldwide with a budget of no more than $160 million, but received mixed reviews from critics.

Adamson achieved commercial success and worldwide attention with The Chronicles of Narnia: The Lion, the Witch and the Wardrobe, which he co-produced, co-wrote and directed. The film is based on the book of the same name by C. S. Lewis, and won various awards, gained critical praise and was a box office success, becoming the third highest-grossing film worldwide of 2005 according to Box Office Mojo. The film opened in the US and Canada with totals of higher than $65 million and the film ended up with a worldwide gross of $744,783,957 with a budget of $180 million according to Box Office Mojo.

He returned as director to the next Narnia film: The Chronicles of Narnia: Prince Caspian, which had a worldwide release in May 2008 and grossed over $419 million at the box office. Adamson returned as producer of The Chronicles of Narnia: The Voyage of the Dawn Treader, released in Australia on 9 December 2010, and in the United States and UK on 10 December the same year. 20th Century Fox and Walden Media still hold the rights to the series, and they currently retain the option to make The Chronicles of Narnia: The Silver Chair in the future. However, 20th Century Fox and Walden Media decided to produce The Magician's Nephew as the next Narnia film instead of The Silver Chair. But, in October 2011, Douglas Gresham confirmed that Walden Media's contract with the C. S. Lewis estate had expired, and any production of a future film was on hold indefinitely.

Experimental hip hop group Death Grips collaborated with Adamson on their 2018 album Year of the Snitch. He appears on the track "Dilemma," delivering a spoken word introduction to the song.

== Filmography ==
Year	Title	Director	Writer	Producer
2001	Shrek	Yes	No	No
2004	Shrek 2	Yes	Yes	No
2005	The Chronicles of Narnia: The Lion, the Witch and the Wardrobe	Yes	Yes	Executive
2007	Shrek the Third	No	Story	Executive
2008	The Chronicles of Narnia: Prince Caspian	Yes	Yes	Yes
2010	The Chronicles of Narnia: The Voyage of the Dawn Treader	No	No	Yes
2012	Mr. Pip	Yes	Yes	Yes
2012	Cirque du Soleil: Worlds Away	Yes	Yes	Yes

Executive producer only

- Ballast (2008)
- Shrek Forever After (2010)
- Puss in Boots (2011)
- Puss in Boots: The Last Wish (2022)

Other credits

Year	Title	Role
1992	Toys	Technical director
1993	Heart and Souls	Animation supervisor
1994	Angels in the Outfield	Visual effects supervisor
1995	Batman Forever	Visual effects supervisor
1996	The Frighteners	Visual effects supervisor
1996	A Time to Kill	Visual effects supervisor
1997	Batman & Robin	Visual effects supervisor
2000	Sleep Easy, Hutch Rimes	Grip
2001	Shrek	Voice of Duloc Mascot, Songwriter: Merry Men
2001	Pâté	Grip; short film
2004	Shrek 2	Voice of Captain of the Guards, Songwriter: Fairy Godmother's Song
2007	Shrek the Third	Additional screenplay material
2012	Mirror Mirror	Very special thanks
2014	The Dark Horse	Special thanks
2018	Year of the Snitch	Spoken word on "Dilemma"
2020	Prop Culture	Himself, Episode: "The Lion, Witch, and the Wardrobe"

== Accolades and honour ==
Adamson has directed films that have received several accolades. Shrek won the Academy Award for Best Animated Feature, the BAFTA Award for Best Adapted Screenplay, and the National Board of Review Award for Best Animated Film. Shrek 2 won the People's Choice Awards for Favorite Movie Comedy, Favorite Sequel, and Favorite Animated Movie. The Chronicles of Narnia: The Lion, The Witch and the Wardrobe won the Academy Award for Best Makeup and Hairstyling, the BAFTA Award for Best Makeup and Hair, the Broadcast Film Critics Association Award for Best Family Film, and the Saturn Awards for Best Make-up and Best Special Effects.

Adamson was appointed a Member of the New Zealand Order of Merit, for services to film, in the 2006 Queen's Birthday Honours.
