= Gmail and the Restraining Orders =

EP by Death Grips
- Released: June 21, 2019
- Recorded: 2015
- Genre: Sound collage; noise rock
- Length: 28:23
- Label: Third Worlds
- Producer: Death Grips

Death Grips chronology
Year of the Snitch (2018)	Gmail and the Restraining Orders (2019)

Death Grips EP chronology
Steroids (Crouching Tiger Hidden Gabber Megamix) (2017)	Gmail and the Restraining Orders (2019)

Gmail and the Restraining Orders is the fourth EP by the American experimental hip-hop group Death Grips, self-released by the band on June 21, 2019, in celebration of Warp Records' 30th anniversary. It first premiered on NTS Radio during their WXAXRXP broadcast, and was played at a Warp Records radio festival. The EP was released to streaming platforms as an official Death Grips release on January 27, 2021.

The piece was played before Death Grips' 2015 live performances, under no specific name.

== Background and release ==
Gmail and the Restraining Orders was originally used as a soundscape for the opening of the band's live shows during their 2015 The Powers That B tour. On June 19, 2019, the code of Warp Records' website warp.net accidentally leaked the NTS Radio schedule, showing Death Grips listed as a special guest. The next day Warp Records posted an official schedule, confirming the Death Grips appearance. Shortly thereafter, the name of Death Grips' set was shown to be Gmail and the Restraining Orders. The 28-minute mix was streamed via NTS Radio's website on June 21.

Shortly after the mix aired, Death Grips posted a link to an unofficial fan recording of the NTS broadcast on YouTube via their Twitter account.

The track was given an official release to streaming services on January 27, 2021.

== Track listing ==
Gmail and the Restraining Orders track listing
No.	Title	Length
1.	"Gmail and the Restraining Orders"	28:23
Total length:		28:23

== Personnel ==
Death Grips

- MC Ride – vocals
- Zach Hill – drums
- Andy Morin – keyboards, production
