= Angelica Cob-Baehler =

Costa Rican-American music industry executive (1971–2018)

- Born: Angelica Cob; November 9, 1971; San José, Costa Rica
- Died: November 21, 2018 (aged 47); Los Angeles, California, U.S.
- Education: University of California, Los Angeles
- Occupation: Music industry executive
- Board member of: Generosity Water, The Thirst Project
- Spouse: Chapman Baehler
- Children: 2

Angelica Cob-Baehler (November 9, 1971 – November 21, 2018) was a Costa Rican-American music industry executive and television producer. The head of music operations at The Firm, and the chief marketing officer for the basketball league Big 3, she previously held senior positions at Columbia Records, EMI and Epic.

== Early life ==
Cob-Baehler was born in San José, Costa Rica, in 1971 and moved with her family to Burbank, California, in 1981. She attended UCLA and graduated with a degree in political science in 1993.

== Career ==
Cob-Baehler interned at Elektra Records during her senior year in college, and was hired as an assistant in the publicity department at Atlantic Records in 1993. She was promoted shortly thereafter, and as a publicist for the label she worked with artists including Kid Rock, Sugar Ray, P.O.D., Jewel, and Stone Temple Pilots. In 1997, she was promoted to national director of media relations, and transferred from Atlantic's Los Angeles office to their New York headquarters. She left the company in 2001 to accept a job at Columbia Records.

At Columbia, Cob-Baehler supervised the label's West Coast press department while working with John Mayer, System of a Down, The Offspring, Coheed and Cambria, and the Raveonettes, among others. She was named Vice President of Publicity in 2002 and soon met then 17-year-old Katy Perry, who had yet to release an album on the label, and became one of her earliest supporters.

In 2005, Cob-Baehler was named senior vice president of publicity at Virgin Records. At Virgin, she was responsible for press campaigns for artists including Thirty Seconds to Mars, Joss Stone, KT Tunstall, and Iggy Pop and the Stooges. When the Virgin label was merged with Capitol/EMI, she was appointed to the position of senior vice president of media and creative services for EMI Music's associated labels: Angel, Astralwerks, Blue Note, Capitol, Capitol Latin, Manhattan, and Virgin.

With Perry's album unreleased by Columbia, Cob-Baehler began a campaign to bring her to Capitol Music Group in 2005.She gained the support of Jason Flom, then the CEO of the label, and Perry was signed to Capitol/Virgin in 2006. Cob-Baehler was credited for creative direction and A&R on Perry's album One of the Boys, which went on to sell more than 5,000,000 albums worldwide. She also served as the creative director for Perry's Teenage Dream. Cob-Baehler continued to work closely with Perry until Cob-Baehler left EMI in 2011 to become executive vice president of marketing at Epic Records.

In addition to heading marketing at Epic, Cob-Baehler served in an a&r capacity. Among other artists, she signed the controversial hip hop band Death Grips, who were named Spin magazine's "Artist of the Year" in 2012.

In February 2013, Cob-Baehler joined The Firm/The Online Network as the head of marketing and associate producer. Then known as Prospect Park Productions, she led the marketing campaign for the soap operas All My Children and One Life to Live about which The Hollywood Reporter wrote: "Not only are they (TOLN) the first company to revive a long-running daytime drama (thus changing the game for the genre entirely) they are taking two brands with a combined age of over 80 years and basically making them cool again.” Production was halted in 2013 due to a dispute with ABC, and both series were ultimately cancelled. Following the cancellation, Cob-Baehler transitioned to a position as an artist manager. She was promoted to head the Firm's music operations in June 2016,. She also served as the chief marketing officer for Big 3, a basketball league founded by Jeff Kwatinetz and Ice Cube.

Cob-Baehler appeared on Billboard's 2011 list of prominent women in music. She co-produced the 2017 20-episode season of Hip Hop Squares. She served on the board of directors for Generosity Water, the Thirst Project and MusiCares.

== Personal life ==
Cob-Baehler lived in Los Angeles with her husband, photographer Chapman Baehler, with whom she had two daughters. Cob-Baehler was diagnosed with throat cancer in 2017. She died in Los Angeles on November 21, 2018, at the age of 47.
