= The Money Store =

2012 studio album by Death Grips

- Uncensored cover. The censored artwork includes a white bar with the album name printed over the breasts.

Studio album by Death Grips
- Released: April 24, 2012
- Recorded: 2011–2012
- Genres: Experimental hip-hop; industrial hip-hop; hardcore hip-hop
- Length: 40:52
- Label: Epic
- Producers: Zach Hill; Andy Morin

Death Grips chronology
Live from Death Valley (2011)	The Money Store (2012)	No Love Deep Web (2012)

The Money Store is the debut studio album by American experimental hip hop trio Death Grips. It is the follow-up to their debut mixtape, Exmilitary. The album was officially released on April 24, 2012, but had been leaked to YouTube on April 14, sold by the band at Coachella on cassette on April 20, and made available on vinyl on April 21 to celebrate Record Store Day. The Money Store was announced alongside the group's second album, No Love Deep Web, which was released later in the year.

== Background ==
Death Grips formed in Sacramento, California, in December 2010, comprising vocalist Stefan Burnett (a.k.a. MC Ride), drummer Zach Hill, and producer Andy Morin. The group first attracted significant attention in 2011 with the release of their debut mixtape, Exmilitary, which was made available as a free digital download. The project received widespread critical notice and helped characterize the group's abrasive fusion of alternative hip-hop, industrial music, and hardcore punk. Around the same period, Hill was already known for his work in the math rock band Hella.

In February 2012, Death Grips signed to the major label Epic Records, a subsidiary of Sony Music. The signing drew attention given the group's experimental style and prior independent releases. The band also announced that they intended to release two albums within the same year, with The Money Store scheduled for April and a second project planned for later in the year. Much of the material for The Money Store had already been recorded before the deal was finalized, and the label reportedly allowed the group to retain creative control over their output.

The rollout for The Money Store included several pre-release promotion: the album was first hinted at with the release of a music video for the track "Blackjack" on February 7, 2012, followed by the release of the track "Get Got" in February 27, both of which were posted online for free the following day. On March 13, Death Grips released the track "Lost Boys". On March 27, they released the music video for the song "The Fever (Aye Aye)", followed by a free download.

== Musical style ==
The Money Store has been described by journalists as experimental hip hop, industrial hip hop and hardcore hip-hop. The album incorporates influences from genres such as dubstep, juke, ghettotech, heavy metal, and synth-pop. Crack's Mike Vinti has noted the use of unconventional samples, utilizing unconventional samples such as tennis grunts from the Williams sisters and the sound of the Vancouver SkyTrain. Several tracks also incorporate samples from the compilation Music from Saharan Cellphones. Vocalist Burnett delivers lyrics in a manner akin to a harsh, terrified shout. His lyrical content is often cryptic and evocative, focusing on themes of paranoia, violence, and social alienation. The production is handled by Hill and Morin and combines programmed and live elements, including synthesizer-driven textures and distorted drum patterns. Hill's drumming is frequently syncopated and altered through studio processing, contributing to an irregular rhythmic structure.

== Release ==
The album cover depicts a female masochist, with "Death Grips" carved into her chest, on the leash of a smoking female sadist. The image is painted by Sua Yoo. They later appeared on the album art for the band's 2015 soundtrack album, Fashion Week. It originally appeared in a zine, but the band name carved into the submissive's chest was added afterwards. The non-explicit variant of the album cover includes a white bar with the album name printed across it, censoring the breasts.

In May 4, Death Grips announced via Facebook that they had cancelled their upcoming tour dates in support of The Money Store in order to finish the recording of their second record, No Love Deep Web, stating "[sic] we are dropping out to complete our next album NO LOVE. see you when it's done. (there are no longer any scheduled shows)".

In September 10, a song titled "@DeathGripz", named after their Twitter username, was released as the final installment of the Adult Swim Singles Program 2012. The group had stated earlier that it was an unreleased cut from The Money Store.

== Reception ==
Professional ratings
Aggregate scores
Source	Rating
AnyDecentMusic?	8.4/10
Metacritic	81/100
Review scores
Source	Rating
AllMusic	5/5 stars
The A.V. Club	B+
The Guardian	2/5 stars
Los Angeles Times	3/4 stars
Mojo	4/5 stars
MSN Music (Expert Witness)	A−
NME	6/10
Pitchfork	8.7/10
Q	4/5 stars
Spin	8/10

According to the review aggregator Metacritic, The Money Store received "universal acclaim" based on a weighted average score of 81 out of 100 from 27 critic scores. Music journalist Jim Carroll of The Irish Times summarized: "MC Ride, Andy Morin and Zach Hill set out to create an intense, spectacular, feral racket and succeed in spades. Once you get used to the fact that they're fuming, you'll thrill to the raw, fractured, incessant and apocalyptic barrage of noise as Death Grips prepare for the end of the world".

Jayson Greene of Pitchfork assigned the album a "Best New Music" label and wrote that "The Money Store is about as intellectual an experience as a scraped knee. But it's just as good at reminding you that you're alive." Spin, while very positive towards The Money Store, felt it was inferior to Exmilitary for the rejection of the mixtape's use of samples, specifically "the raw, imperfect way that samples rub up against one another." It was also the first album which music critic Anthony Fantano rated a 10 upon its release.

Less satisfied reviewers included Louis Pattison of NME, who felt its "utterly convincing" dystopian vision was ruined by an "alienating" presentation of themes that lacked a goal. The Guardian's Alex Macpherson, who claimed Burnett's "one-note" vocal performance distracted the listener from the instrumentals' "careening thrill;" and Sputnikmusic, who panned the "poor taste" blend of genres and production elements and "MC Ride's consistently incoherent mumbling and meme-of-the-day approach to making hooks" that muddled the record's lyrical complexities.

=== Accolades ===
Publication	Accolade	Rank	Ref.
The 405	Albums of the Year	8	
AllMusic	Best of 2012	18	
AllMusic	Decade in Review	Unranked	
BBC Music	Top 25 Albums of 2012	6	
Beats Per Minute	The Top 50 Albums of 2012	46	
Clash	The Top 40 Albums Of 2012	4	
Complex	The 50 Best Albums of 2012	40	
Consequence of Sound	Top 50 Albums of 2012	16	
Genius	100 Best Albums of the 2010s	27	
Gigwise	Albums of the Year	28	
Gorilla vs. Bear	Albums of 2012	47	
Metacritic	Best Music of 2012 So Far	22	
New York	Nitsuh Abebe's Top Ten Albums of 2012	4	
No Ripcord	Top 50 Albums Of 2012	3	
Pitchfork	The Top 50 Albums of 2012	9	
Pitchfork	The 100 Best Albums of the Decade So Far (2010–14)	34	
Pitchfork	The 200 Best Albums of the 2010s	117	
Pitchfork	The 33 Best Industrial Albums of All Time	25	
The Plain Dealer	100 Greatest Albums of the 2010s	24	
PopMatters	The 75 Best Albums of 2012	29	
Pretty Much Amazing	Best Albums of 2012	23	
The Skinny	The Albums of 2012	1	
Spin	The 101 Best Albums of the 2010s	38	
Stereogum	Top 25 Albums Of 2012 So Far	18	
Time Out London	The 50 Best Albums of 2012	2	
Tiny Mix Tapes	Favorite 50 Albums of 2012	16	
Tiny Mix Tapes	Favorite 100 Music Releases of the Decade	39	
Treble	Top 50 Albums of 2012	18	
Treble	Top 150 Albums of the 2010s	127	
The Village Voice	Pazz & Jop	45	
Vulture	Top Ten Albums of 2012	4	
The Wire	2012 Rewind: Releases of the Year	15	

== Track listing ==
All tracks are written by Death Grips.

The Money Store track listing
No.	Title	Length
1.	"Get Got"	2:52
2.	"The Fever (Aye Aye)"	3:07
3.	"Lost Boys"	3:07
4.	"Blackjack"	2:22
5.	"Hustle Bones"	3:05
6.	"I've Seen Footage"	3:21
7.	"Double Helix"	2:35
8.	"System Blower"	3:44
9.	"The Cage"	3:27
10.	"Punk Weight"	3:21
11.	"Fuck That"	2:25
12.	"Bitch Please"	2:56
13.	"Hacker"	4:30
Total length:		40:52

== Personnel ==
- Stefan Burnett – vocals
- Zach Hill – production
- Andy Morin – production
- Angelica Cob-Baehler – A&R
- Sua Yoo – cover drawing

== Charts ==
Chart (2012)	Peak position
US Alternative Albums	24
US Billboard 200	130
US Heatseeker Albums	3
US Rap Albums	14
US Top Rock Albums	39

== Release history ==
Region	Date	Format(s)	Label(s)	Ref.
Worldwide	April 14, 2012	YouTube stream	Self-released (following internet leak)	
US	April 20, 2012	Cassette sold by the band at Coachella	Self-released	
US & UK	April 21, 2012	Record Store Day pre-release LP	Epic	
Worldwide	April 24, 2012	LP, CD, digital	Epic	
US & UK	April 18, 2015	Record Store Day black/white split LP	Epic	
US	June 3, 2022	Record Store Day Essentials LP	Epic	
