= Steroids (Crouching Tiger Hidden Gabber Megamix) =

EP by Death Grips
- Released: May 22, 2017
- Genres: Experimental hip hop; digital hardcore; gabber
- Length: 22:31 (2017 EP); 37:40 (2019 LP)
- Label: Third Worlds
- Producer: Death Grips

Death Grips chronology
Bottomless Pit (2016)	Steroids (Crouching Tiger Hidden Gabber Megamix) (2017)	Year of the Snitch (2018)

Death Grips EP chronology
Interview 2016 (2016)	Steroids (Crouching Tiger Hidden Gabber Megamix) (2017)	Gmail and the Restraining Orders (2019)

Steroids (Crouching Tiger Hidden Gabber Megamix) is the third EP by the American experimental hip hop group Death Grips, self-released by the band on May 22, 2017. The piece, a mix of 8 (disputably 7) songs on a single track, was described by Stereogum as a "barrage of noise".

The band announced the EP on Facebook, also announcing the development of their then-unnamed sixth studio album Year of the Snitch. The post reads: "we're working on the new death grips album. but in the meantime, here's a new track/mix. it's 22 minutes."

The EP was later released for the first time physically on vinyl for Record Store Day 2019, featuring the previously YouTube-exclusive tracks "More Than the Fairy" and "Electronic Drum Solo (Dub Mix)" as B-sides.

== Track listing ==
No.	Title	Length
1.	"Steroids (Crouching Tiger Hidden Gabber Megamix)"	22:31

Record Store Day LP

Side one
No.	Title	Length
1.	"Steroids (Crouching Tiger Hidden Gabber Megamix)"	22:31

Side two
No.	Title	Length
1.	"More Than the Fairy" (featuring Les Claypool)	3:40
2.	"Electronic Drum Solo" (Dub Mix)	11:29
Total length:		37:40

== Personnel ==
Death Grips

- Zach Hill – drums
- Stefan Burnett – vocals, lyrics
- Andy Morin – synths, keyboards

Additional musician

- Les Claypool – bass on "More Than the Fairy"
