= Fashion Week (album) =

Soundtrack album by Death Grips
- Released: January 4, 2015
- Genres: Instrumental hip hop; industrial; IDM
- Length: 47:47
- Label: Third Worlds
- Producers: Zach Hill; Andy Morin

Death Grips chronology
Niggas on the Moon (2014)	Fashion Week (2015)	Jenny Death (2015)

Fashion Week is an instrumental album by experimental hip hop group Death Grips. It was self-released, available for free, on January 4, 2015, via Third Worlds, without any prior announcement. It was the band's first release after their supposed disbandment in 2014, and also the first release to not feature vocals from frontman MC Ride, which was a major factor in its mixed-to-positive critical reception.

Fashion Week was released on vinyl as the first LP in a 2LP package alongside Death Grips' instrumental EP Interview 2016 for Record Store Day 2016.

== Background ==
Fashion Week was described by the group as a "soundtrack." A leaked .ZIP file was shared via Reddit in late-2014, containing 6 tracks from the album and 2 unreleased tracks, but was initially dismissed by fans as fake. The song titles, follow as: "Runway J", "Runway E" and so on; acrostically spelling out the phrase "JENNY DEATH WHEN", in reference to the clamor surrounding the upcoming second disc (Jenny Death) of The Powers That B, which was eventually released two months later.

The album art features an image of artist Sua Yoo, who designed the band's cover art for The Money Store, sitting in a large chair located at the Silver Legacy Resort & Casino in Reno, Nevada.

== Critical reception ==
Professional ratings
Aggregate scores
Source	Rating
Metacritic	74/100
Review scores
Source	Rating
Exclaim!	7/10
Pitchfork	6.6/10
Pretty Much Amazing	B+
Spin	7/10
Sputnikmusic	2.5/5

According to the review aggregator Metacritic, Fashion Week received "generally favorable reviews" based on a weighted average score of 74 out of 100 from five critic scores.

Calum Slingerland of Exclaim! suggested the lack of Ride's performances made the album very accessible to new listeners of Death Grips, and Spin critic Dan Weiss, comparing Fashion Week to Ghosts I–IV by Nine Inch Nails, wrote that while the album is fairly linear, it still has the group's "astoundingly dark and imaginative sonic palette." The Quietus critic Calum Bradbury-Sparvell described the album as "the most vibrant and least menacing collection of tracks Death Grips have released."

One recurring criticism of Fashion Week was the absence of MC Ride's vocals, with one reviewer suggesting that the instrumentals "stagnate" on their own.

== Track listing ==
No.	Title	Length
1.	"Runway J"	4:09
2.	"Runway E"	3:14
3.	"Runway N"	2:42
4.	"Runway N"	3:01
5.	"Runway Y"	4:01
6.	"Runway D"	4:43
7.	"Runway E"	3:25
8.	"Runway A"	3:37
9.	"Runway T"	2:36
10.	"Runway H"	4:29
11.	"Runway W"	3:29
12.	"Runway H"	3:35
13.	"Runway E"	2:21
14.	"Runway N"	2:01
Total length:		47:47

Leaked .ZIP
No.	Title	Length
1.	"01 Voco Beat 13 Dark"	4:45
2.	"02 Darko Drum 12"	3:59
3.	"03 Day Loop 06"	2:57
4.	"03 Golden 07"	4:02
5.	"05 Red Moon 06 Dark"	3:01
6.	"06 Chateau New Dark"	2:36
7.	"07 Lepso Arp 08 03.03.14"	4:09
8.	"08 New Bass Loop 08 Outboard 2.23.14"	3:39
Total length:		29:08

== Personnel ==
Death Grips

- Zach Hill – drums
- Andy Morin – keyboards, programming
- Nick Reinhart – guitar (12)
