= Interview 2016 =

- The cover art features interview host Matthew Hoffman, cropped from the video thumbnail

EP by Death Grips
- Released: March 22, 2016
- Genres: Instrumental hip hop; glitch music; IDM
- Length: 22:31
- Label: Third Worlds

Death Grips chronology
The Powers That B (2015)	Interview 2016 (2016)	Bottomless Pit (2016)

Death Grips EP chronology
Death Grips (2011)	Interview 2016 (2016)	Steroids (Crouching Tiger Hidden Gabber Megamix) (2017)

Interview 2016 is the second EP by American experimental hip hop group Death Grips, self-released by the band on March 22, 2016. Consisting of six instrumental tracks, the EP acts as a soundtrack album to a previously released interview video with host Matthew Hoffman, which featured the tracks instead of the interview audio.

Interview 2016 was released on vinyl as the second LP in a 2LP package alongside Death Grips' other instrumental album Fashion Week for Record Store Day 2016. Individually, Interview 2016 was also self-released by the band on cassette.

== Critical reception ==
Professional ratings
Review scores
Source	Rating
Pitchfork	7.0/10

Pitchfork Media critic Zoe Camp was positive in her review, stating: "While MC Ride might be perceived as the alpha and omega of Death Grips, Interview 2016 underscores that [Zach] Hill and [Andy] Morin are quite formidable on their own." Camp also thought that the release was "far more interesting than Fashion Week, a full-length twice its size, and it suggests that Death Grips' strength as an instrumental entity shouldn’t be underestimated."

== Track listing ==
No.	Title	Length
1.	"Interview A"	4:50
2.	"Interview B"	5:23
3.	"Interview C"	3:01
4.	"Interview D"	3:49
5.	"Interview E"	1:23
6.	"Interview F"	4:05
Total length:		22:31

== Personnel ==
- Zach Hill
- Andy Morin
