= Zach Hill =

American musician (born 1979)

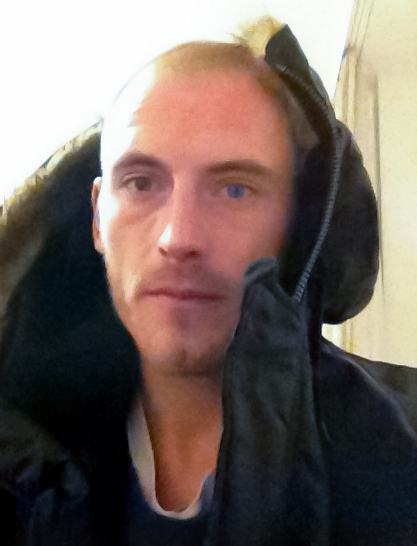
- Hill in 2012

Background information
- Born: Zachary Charles Hill; December 28, 1979 (age 46); Sacramento, California, U.S.
- Genres: Rock; math rock; experimental; electronic; hip hop; noise; industrial; jazz; digital hardcore
- Occupations: Musician; songwriter; record producer; visual artist; director
- Instruments: Drums; vocals; keyboards; guitar; bass; trumpet; sampler
- Years active: 1995–present
- Labels: 5 Rue Christine; Ache; Anticon; Deathbomb Arc; Epic; Ipecac; Joyful Noise; Kill Rock Stars; Narnack; Ormolycka; Overlap; Rodriguez Lopez; The Advantage; Rock Is Hell; Sargent House; Sick Room; Skin Graft; Sub Pop; Suicide Squeeze; Third Worlds; Harvest; Toad
- Member of: Hella; Death Grips; The I.L.Y's; Undo K From Hot
- Formerly of: Legs on Earth; Crime in Choir; Flössin; Diamond Watch Wrists; Team Sleep; Nervous Cop; Holy Smokes; The Ladies; Amen; Bygones; Wavves; El Grupo Nuevo de Omar Rodriguez Lopez

Zachary Charles Hill (born December 28, 1979) is an American multi-instrumentalist and visual artist. He is best known as the drummer and co-producer of industrial hip-hop band Death Grips, experimental rock band the I.L.Y's, as well as the drummer of math rock band Hella.

== Early life ==
Zach Hill was born in Sacramento, California on December 28, 1979. He spent most of his adolescence at his father and uncle's press printing shop, where he was first exposed to classic rock music.

Hill claims that he "started hearing voices in his head telling him to play the drums" when he was about 14 or 15 years old, and bought his first drum set with money he raised with a friend from a garage sale. He dropped out of high school at age 15 and moved to Nevada City, California, where he started the band Legs on Earth with Julian Imsdahl, Spencer Seim, and cousin Josh Hill. Hill later moved to San Francisco, California where he played drums in the band Crime in Choir before starting Hella in 2001.

== Art ==
In addition to music, Hill is also a visual artist. He published a fully illustrated book, Destroying Yourself is Too Accessible, which included the Zach Hill and Holy Smokes album Masculine Drugs released in 2004 on TNI Books and Suicide Squeeze Records.

The Sacramento, California, art space Fools Foundation ran an exhibition of Hill's art, titled "Poltergeist", from April 1 to April 29, 2006. Parts of the exhibit are visible in the photos accompanying Hill's article in the August 2006 issue of Modern Drummer and on the Fools Foundation website.

== Filmography ==
Hill was said to be working on an original feature film in 2013, which was confirmed to feature late actress Karen Black in a leading role. However, she had died before the film could come into full fruition. A shortened excerpt of the footage was posted on the Death Grips YouTube account in October 2015 in a 15-minute video entitled "Bottomless Pit". It has been rumored that either Death Grips or Hill's side-project, the I.L.Y's, would be involved with the soundtrack of the film as well.

== Discography ==
=== Solo releases ===
- Astrological Straits (2008)
- Face Tat (2010)

as Xach Hill

- Lil Scuzzy (2011)

=== With Hella ===
==== Albums ====
- Hold Your Horse Is (2002)
- The Devil Isn't Red (2004)
- Church Gone Wild/Chirpin' Hard (2005)
- There's No 666 in Outer Space (2007)
- Tripper (2011)

==== Extended plays ====
- Leather Diamond (2001)
- Falam Dynasty (2002)
- Bitches Ain't Shit but Good People (2003)
- Total Bugs Bunny on Wild Bass (2003)
- Acoustics (2004)
- Concentration Face & Homeboy (2005)
- Acoustics (2006)
- Santa's Little Hella (2013)

==== DVDs ====
- Portals (2008)

==== Split albums ====
with Dilute

- Live (2003)

with Four Tet

- Split Seven Inch Divorce Series 1 (2004)

=== With Flössin ===
- Lead Singer (2004)
- Live at Overlap 01 (2006)
- Serpents (2009)
- White Anaconda and the Rainbow Boa (2011)

=== With Holy Smokes ===
as Zach Hill & Holy Smokes

- Masculine Drugs / Destroying Yourself Is Too Accessible (2004)

as Holy Smokes

- Talk to Your Kids About Gangs (2006)

=== With Team Sleep ===
- Team Sleep (2005)

=== With Mick Barr ===
- Shred Earthship (2006)
- Volume 2 (2007)
- Volthree (2020)

=== With Marnie Stern ===
- In Advance of the Broken Arm (2007)
- This Is It and I Am It and You Are It and So Is That and He Is It and She Is It and It Is It and That Is That (2008)
- Marnie Stern (2010)

=== With Bygones ===
- By- (2009)
- Spiritual Bankruptcy (2010)

=== With Wavves ===
- Babes (2023, recorded 2009)

=== With Omar Rodríguez-López ===
- Mantra Hiroshima (2010)
- Telesterion (2011)

as El Grupo Nuevo de Omar Rodriguez Lopez

- Cryptomnesia (2009)

=== With Death Grips ===
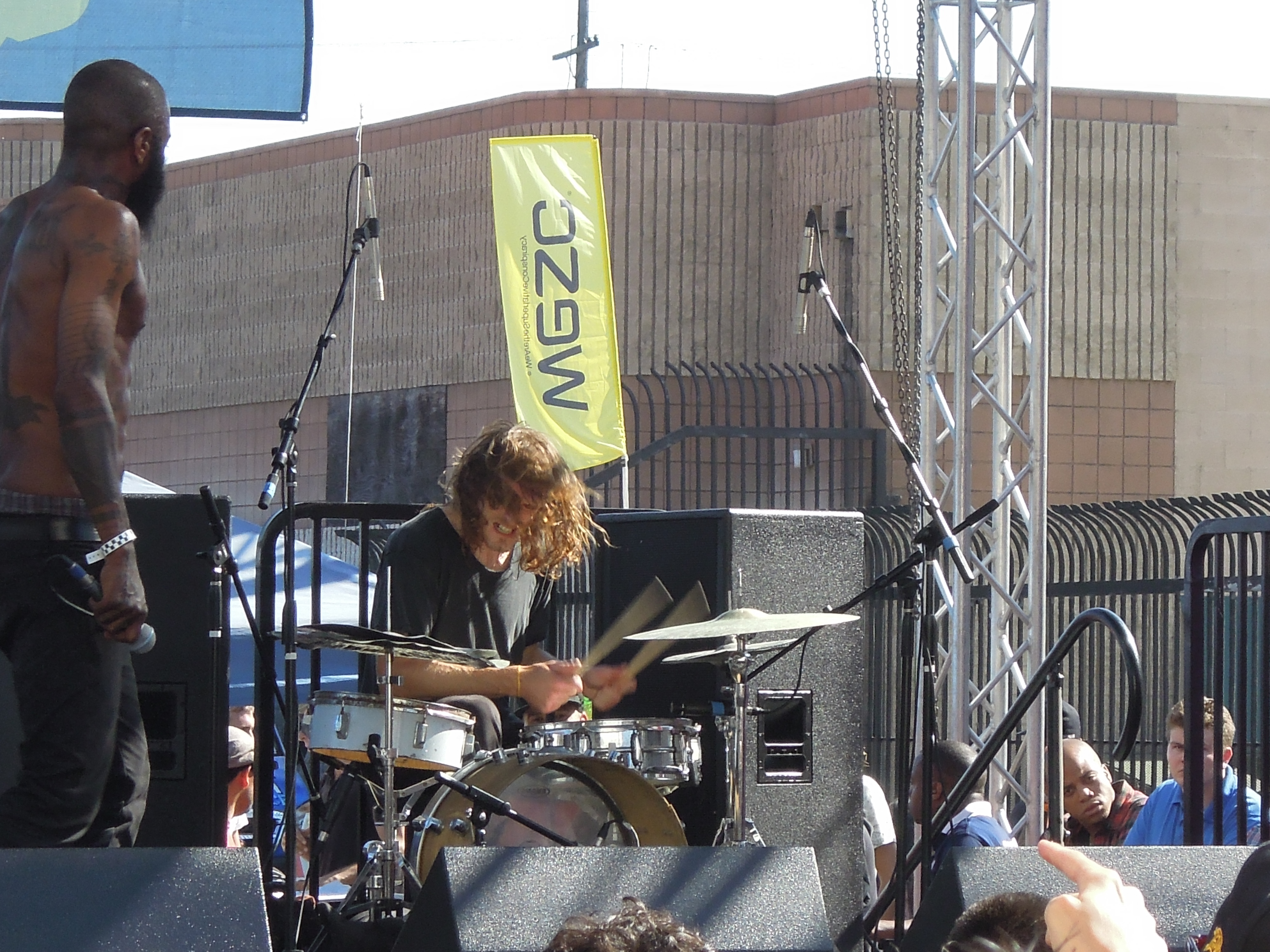
Hill (right) and MC Ride performing as Death Grips.

==== Albums ====
- The Money Store (2012)
- No Love Deep Web (2012)
- Government Plates (2013)
- Fashion Week (2015)
- The Powers That B (2015)
- Bottomless Pit (2016)
- Year of the Snitch (2018)

==== Mixtapes ====
- Exmilitary (2011)

==== Extended plays ====
- Death Grips (2011)
- Interview 2016 (2016)
- Steroids (Crouching Tiger Hidden Gabber Megamix) (2017)
- Gmail and the Restraining Orders (2019)

=== With Spoek Mathambo ===
- Put Some Red on It (2011)
- Father Creeper (2012)

=== With the I.L.Y's ===
- I've Always Been Good at True Love (2015)
- Scum With Boundaries (2016)
- Bodyguard (2017)

=== With Undo K From Hot ===
- G.A.S. Get a Star (2021)
- Dumb Little Fucker (2021)
- Remnants of Chris (2022)

=== Other bands and collaborations ===
| Release details | Release | Artist | Additional information | Ref |
|---|---|---|---|---|
| Released: 1999; Label: Para-Sight; Formats: CD | Lasers and Saviors | Legs on Earth | | |
| Released: January 1, 2001; Label: Perishable; Formats: CD, LP | 10 Songs | Friend/Enemy | | |
| Released: June 25, 2002; Label: Omnibus; Formats: CD, LP | Crime in Choir | Crime in Choir | | |
| Released: July 30, 2002; Label: Absolutely Kosher/Nail in the Coffin; Formats: CD, 12" | Chapel of the Chimes | Xiu Xiu | | |
| Released: November 12, 2002; Label: 5 Rue Christine Formats: CD | Nervous Cop | Nervous Cop | | |
| Released: November 18, 2003; Label: Jade Tree; Formats: CD | Maryland Mansions | Cex | | |
| Released: 2005; Label: Mash Down Babylon; Formats: CD | Apotheke | Apotheke | | |
| Released: January 17, 2005; Label: Frenetic; Formats: 2CD | Thank Gods It's Friday/Louisiana Purchase | Toughguy Fantasy/Arctic Boys | | |
| Released: May 3, 2005; Label: Temporary Residence Limited; Formats: CD | Howard Hello | Howard Hello | | |
| Released: February 21, 2006; Label: Temporary Residence Limited; Formats: CD, LP | They Mean Us | The Ladies | | |
| Released: October 24, 2010; Label: Temporary Residence Limited; Formats: CD, LP | Distressed | Damsel | | |
| Released: 2007; Label: self-released; Formats: CD-R | Flannel Graduate | with No Age | | |
| Released: August 14, 2007; Label: self-released; Formats: CD-R | Greener Grassing | Them Hills | | |
| Released: August 31, 2007; Label: self-released; Formats: Digital | "Untitled" | with Ben Weinman | | |
| Released: 2008; Label: aRCHIVE; Formats: 2DVD | Mick Barr | Mick Barr | | |
| Released: April 14, 2009; Label: Warp; Formats: CD/2LP | Everything She Touched Turned Ampexian | Prefuse 73 | | |
| Released: May 4, 2009; Label: Warp; Formats: CD | Ice Capped at Both Ends | Diamond Watch Wrists | | |
| Released: October 20, 2009; Label: Porter; Formats: CD, LP | Aggressively Humble | Chll Pll | | |
| Released: October 28, 2009; Label: Important; Formats: CD, LP | Non Meters Volume One | Risil | | |
| Released: April 11, 2010; Label: Sundial; Formats: Digital | eclecticraft | Aaron Molho | | |
| Released: June 15, 2010; Label: Porter; Formats: CD, LP | Who Do You Think You Aren't? | with Robby Moncrieff | | |
| Released: October 10, 2010; Label: Life's Blood; Formats: 2x7" | Split | Mason Lindahl/Ellie Fortune/Raleigh Moncrief/Zach Hill | | |
| Released: October 10, 2010; Label: Lex; Formats: 3LP+3CD | Unearthing | Alan Moore & Mitch Jenkins | | |
| Released: February 7, 2011; Label: Joyful Noise; Formats: 2LP | Oh Brother | Joan of Arc | | |
| Released: July 5, 2011; Label: self-released; Formats: Digital | Many Moods | with Delicate Steve | | |
| Released: August 6, 2011; Label: Altered Beats; Formats: Digital | Initium | Sol Invicto | | |
| Released: August 27, 2013; Label: Jackpot; Formats: LP | Drumgasm | Weiss/Cameron/Hill | | |
| Released: October 14, 2016; Label: Party Smasher, Cooking Vinyl; Formats: CD, LP, DL | Dissociation | The Dillinger Escape Plan | additional drums on "Dissociation" | |
| Released: May 5, 2017; Label: Joyful Noise; Formats: LP, Digital | Nervous Cop (EP) | Nervous Cop | | |
| Released: February 11, 2022; Label: Sargeant House; Formats: DL | Alto Arc EP | Alto Arc (George Clarke, Isamaya Ffrench, Danny L Harle & Trayer Tryon) | additional production on "Yeva's Lullaby" | |
| Released: April 15, 2022; Label: Melodic Virtue; Formats: Digital, 10" | Santa Dog | Star Stunted (Hill, Sam Coomes, Rob Crow, Mike Morasky, Ego Plum, Aaron Tanner) | | |
| Released: September 1, 2023; Label: self-released; Formats: Digital, 7" | Never (EP) | with Lucas Abela | sequencing and envelope generation | |
| Released: October 31, 2025; Label: Warp; Formats: Digital, 7" | Bag of Max Bag of Cass | with Lucas Abela | | |
| Released: July 31, 2026; Label: Apeshit; Formats: Digital | Who Asked? | Domi and JD Beck | Sound designer | |

=== Other appearances ===
- Various Artists (Hella) – If the Twenty-First Century Didn't Exist It Would Be Necessary to Invent It (2002)
- Various Artists (Team Sleep) – The Matrix Reloaded (Music from and Inspired by the Motion Picture) (2003)
- Various Artists (Hella) – You've Got Your Orders – Volume One (2003)
- Various Artists (Les Claypool) – Under the Influence: A Jam Band Tribute to Lynyrd Skynyrd (2004)
- Various Artists (Hella) – Slaying Since 1996 (2006)
- Various Artists (The Ladies) – Thankful CD (2006)
- Various Artists (Diamond Watch Wrists) – Warp20 (Recreated) (2009)
- Various Artists – Revival Drum Comp (2010)
- Various Artists – Zum Audio Vol 4 Digital (2021)
