= Live from Death Valley =

Single by Death Grips
- Released: June 28, 2011 (original) July 11, 2022 (streaming services)
- Recorded: 2011
- Length: 2:54
- Label: Deathbomb Arc; Third Worlds
- Producer: Death Grips

Death Grips singles chronology
"Exmilitary" (2011)	"Live from Death Valley" (2011)	"The Money Store" (2012)

"Live from Death Valley" is a single by experimental hip hop group Death Grips, released on June 28, 2011, through Deathbomb Arc.

== Background ==
In June 2011, free downloads of "Live from Death Valley" were made available through Deathbomb Arc's Bandcamp page, with cover art for the single made by Mario Zoots.

In late August 2016, Deathbomb Arc issued cassettes for sale on their website, stating that it had "been requested time and again to get some sort of physical release".

On July 11, 2022, the two tracks were re-released on streaming services.

== Track listing ==
No.	Title	Length
1.	"Poser Killer"	1:37
2.	"Fyrd Up"	1:17
