= Death Grips =

American experimental band

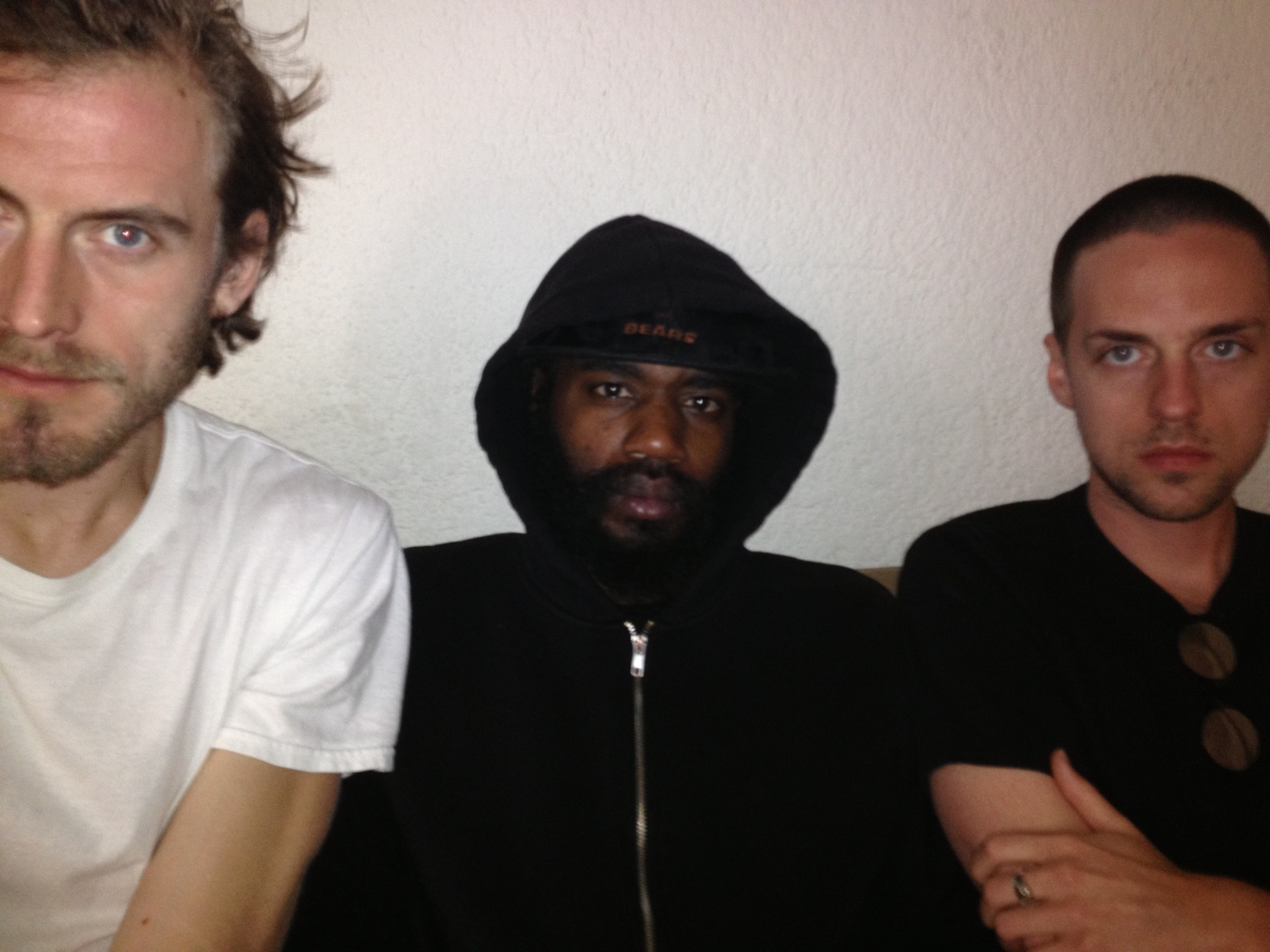
- Death Grips in 2014. From left to right: Zach Hill, Stefan Burnett, Andy Morin

Background information
- Origin: Sacramento, California, U.S.
- Genres: Experimental hip-hop; industrial hip-hop; punk rap; electropunk; rap rock
- Works: Discography
- Years active: 2010–2014; 2015–present
- Labels: Third Worlds; Harvest; Epic; Deathbomb Arc
- Spinoffs: The I.L.Y's
- Members: Stefan Burnett; Zach Hill; Andy Morin (Note: Morin's status in the band is currently unknown; recent posts from the band sign off as "Stefan and Zach," without mention of Morin.)
- Website: thirdworlds.net

Death Grips is an American experimental hip-hop band formed in 2010 in Sacramento, California. The group consists of producers Zach Hill (drums), Andy Morin (engineering), and vocalist Stefan Burnett, also known as MC Ride. Though he is not the group's frontman, Hill has been credited with being the driving creative force behind the project. Drawing from hip-hop, punk rock, electronic, noise, and industrial styles, the band's innovative and often difficult-to-categorize sound earned them critical acclaim and a cult following, while their aggressive performance style and cryptic interactions with their fans and the media gained widespread notoriety.

The group released the mixtape Exmilitary in April 2011 and their debut studio album, The Money Store, a year later; both received critical praise. Shortly after signing to Epic Records in 2012, the group leaked their second album, No Love Deep Web, for free download in breach of their contract and were dropped from the label. They subsequently launched the label Third Worlds in association with Harvest Records, and released their third album, Government Plates, in 2013. Following several broken performance commitments, the group announced their disbanding in July 2014 along with the release of their fourth album, a double album titled The Powers That B. The group leaked the first disc of this double album, Niggas on the Moon, in 2014. In early 2015, before releasing the second disc, Jenny Death, the group released an instrumental "soundtrack" album titled Fashion Week. In March 2015, the group revealed that they "might make some more" music, and later announced a world tour.

Later in 2015, Death Grips announced their fifth official studio album, Bottomless Pit, which was released in May 2016. Their sixth studio album, Year of the Snitch, was released in June 2018. Their fourth EP, Gmail and the Restraining Orders, was released in June 2019 in celebration of Warp Records' 30th anniversary. Beyond some previously unreleased material added to their website in 2023, the band has published no new music since. A leaked conversation between a fan and Morin in 2025 led to speculation that Death Grips had disbanded, but this was later dismissed by Hill and Burnett who asserted they remain active. In November 2025, Death Grips announced they are working on a new album.

== History ==
=== 2010–2011: Formation and Exmilitary ===
Death Grips was formed in Sacramento, California during the summer of 2010, composed of Zach Hill, Stefan Burnett, and Andy Morin. Andy Morin had previously helped record Hill's 2010 album Face Tat, as well as his then-abandoned album Babes with Wavves frontman Nathan Williams; Burnett was Hill's next-door neighbor, and the two had lived on the same street for several years. Info Warrior and Mexican Girl were mutual collaborators with the others, and were described as "ancillary members" by the band around this time. "Flatlander" was the alias often attributed to Morin; however the band has clarified in interviews he is not "AKA Flatlander."

As the band's activities progressed throughout the year, Death Grips recorded their first song, "Full Moon (Death Classic)" on December 21, 2010, which "accidentally, possibly intuitively" coincided with the first simultaneous total lunar eclipse and winter solstice since 1638. Shortly afterwards, they began work on their debut mixtape Exmilitary until March 2011. On March 8, 2011, they released their debut self-titled EP, and released Exmilitary—featuring three songs from the EP—for free on April 25. Exmilitary received a 7.5 rating from Pitchfork and positive reviews from other outlets, including The Quietus and Drowned in Sound.

The band made their unannounced live debut at The Press Club in Sacramento on June 5. Later that year in September, they released Exmilitary's vocal and instrumental stems under the title Black Google. Throughout 2011, Death Grips began meeting with various record labels, and were meanwhile discovered by Angelica Cob-Baehler, then the executive vice president of marketing at Epic Records. Immediately before their meeting with Epic in October, Burnett tagged the Sony Music Entertainment company bathroom with graffiti, which unexpectedly sold the label on Death Grips, and a deal was struck within five hours.

=== 2012: The Money Store and No Love Deep Web ===
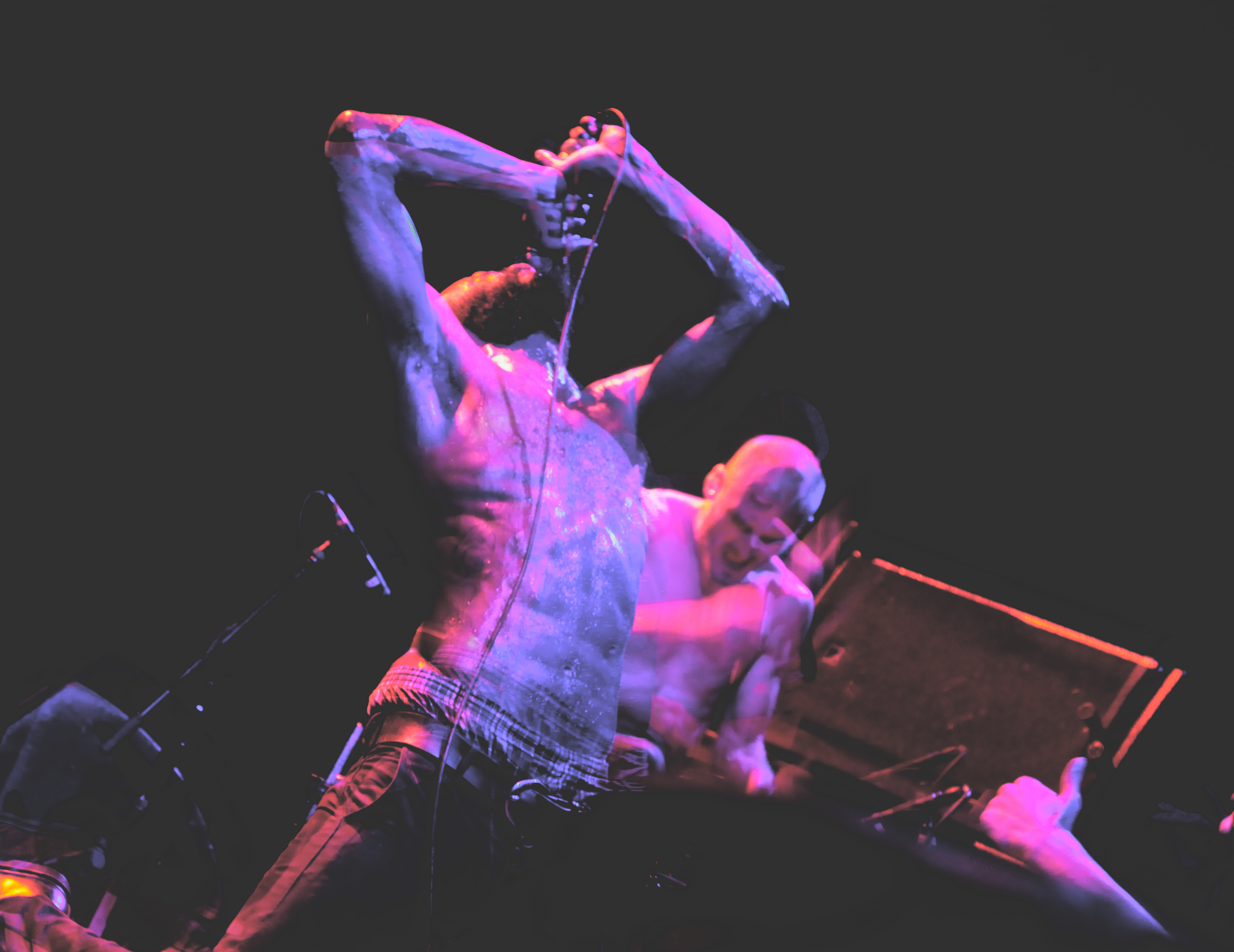
Death Grips performing in New York City in November 2012

Death Grips signed with Epic Records in February 2012, under the recommendation of Epic's then-executive vice president of marketing, Angelica Cob-Baehler. They announced the release of one album in 2012. Their first studio album, The Money Store, was released in April, and debuted on the Billboard 200 chart at No. 130. Termed as "avant-rap", Pitchfork called The Money Store "confrontational, abrasive, and chaotic". The Los Angeles Times called it "punk rock with a hip-hop face-lift".

October saw the release of No Love Deep Web. It was described as a darker album by NPR, saying that the group creates a "soundtrack to modern urban living" with lyrics that describe "constant paranoia". The album contains heavily edited vocal performances from Ride. Its cover art drew attention and controversy for consisting of a picture of Hill's erect penis with the album title written across it. The album was recorded within four months in Sacramento. Prior to that, an international tour was scheduled to support The Money Store, but was immediately cancelled in order to complete No Love Deep Web. This caused conflict between the group and their fans, as well as their label Epic Records. In particular, the album was self-released for legal download via BitTorrent as an effort to bypass their label's original intent to release the album in 2013. Death Grips was cut from their recording contract as a result, and would launch their new label Third Worlds in the following year from "a unique relationship with Harvest/Capitol". Material would then be distributed by Caroline Records.

The group remixed two Björk songs from her album Biophilia, "Sacrifice" and "Thunderbolt", after receiving an artist-to-artist note of support. The re-workings were featured in her 2012 remix album Bastards. A non-album track titled "True Vulture Bare" was issued in October 2012 and was accompanied with an animated video by Galen Pehrson. This project was created for the Museum of Contemporary Art in Los Angeles.

=== 2013–2015: Government Plates and The Powers That B ===
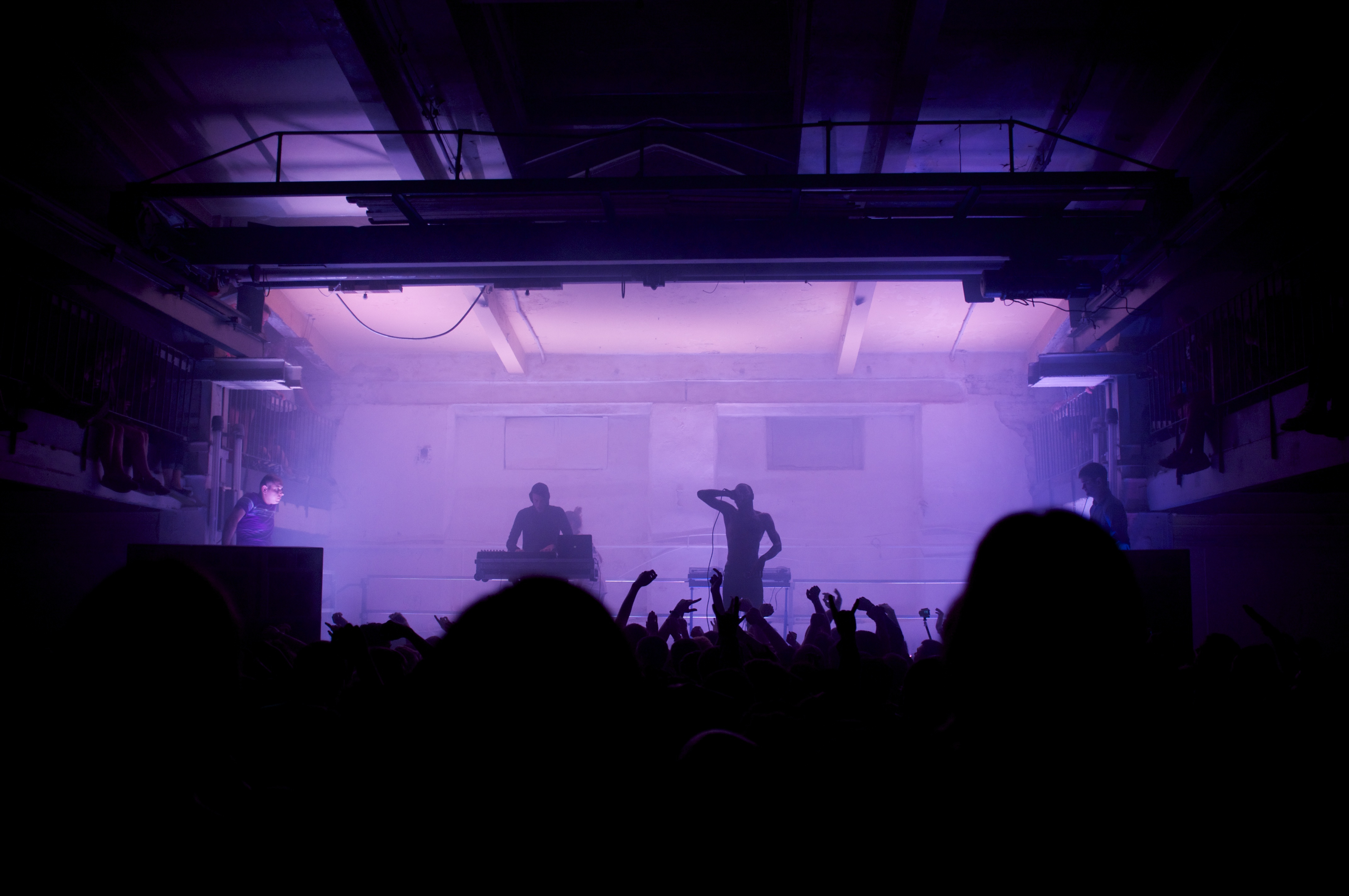
Death Grips performing in Moscow in May 2013

In March 2013, the group released a series of videos to their YouTube account, collectively called No Hands. On March 20, 2013, a music video for "Lock Your Doors", which was recorded at a live show in SXSW, was released. Hill did not attend the show physically, but played the drums via Skype. Hill wrote and directed an original feature film in May, with the involvement of Death Grips in the soundtrack. During this period, Hill was also working on the group's album.

Death Grips were scheduled to perform at Lollapalooza in August, but their performance was cancelled after the group failed to show up for an after-party show the previous night at the Bottom Lounge, instead putting on a playlist of pre-recorded tracks. Draped over the back of the stage was a huge printout of a fan's suicide note, written to the group in the form of an email. Fans at the show destroyed and stole pieces of the band's equipment after being informed of the cancellation. Their subsequent performance scheduled for Montreal's Osheaga Music and Arts Festival on the next day was cancelled, as well as performances in Boston and New York. The group however, never planned to actually appear at Lollapalooza; they later stated that the drum kit, suicide note, and pre-recorded music "was the show". The drum kit that was destroyed was revealed to be a children's learning kit and not Hill's actual kit.

Government Plates (2013) was released for free download on their official website. An NME review called the record "a challenging listen" but dubbed the album, along with Slant Magazine, as "transgressive". The album "[pushes] further away from typical hip-hop" and "[toys] with electronic dance music of various eras", according to The New York Times. In January 2014, Warp Music Publishing signed an exclusive worldwide publishing agreement with the group, covering previous and future releases. In June, Death Grips announced a double album titled The Powers That B, along with a download of the first disc, subtitled Niggas on the Moon. The second disc, Jenny Death, was announced to be released later in the year. Niggas on the Moon features chopped up samples of Björk's vocals. The double album's first half received mixed to positive reviews. Pitchfork called it the group's least intense effort in their entire discography. A review by MusicOMH stated that it had less of Hill's percussion and claimed that Morin lacked direction in producing the album. Death Grips were scheduled as a supporting act to tour with Nine Inch Nails and Soundgarden in July but the group announced an abrupt disbandment, thus cancelling their appearances. An image of the following message, posted on their Facebook page, was written on a napkin:

We are now at our best and so Death Grips is over. We have officially stopped. All currently scheduled live dates are canceled. Our upcoming double album The Powers That B will still be delivered worldwide later this year via Harvest/Third Worlds Records. Death Grips was and always has been a conceptual art exhibition anchored by sound and vision. Above and beyond a "band". To our truest fans, please stay legend.

In January 2015, without any prior notification, Death Grips released a free instrumental album entitled Fashion Week. The song titles, each beginning with the word "Runway" followed by a letter of the alphabet, spelled out the phrase "JENNY DEATH WHEN" in reference to the then-unreleased second disc of The Powers That B. The album was released in its complete form in March and reached the Billboard 200 chart at No. 72. In the same year, Hill and Morin formed a side project called the I.L.Y's and issued their debut album I've Always Been Good at True Love through Death Grips' official website; it was initially released with little information about the project.

=== 2015–2019: Bottomless Pit and Year of the Snitch ===
In October 2015, the group uploaded a video to their YouTube page titled Bottomless Pit. It features footage from 2013 of American actress Karen Black reciting lines from a film script Hill wrote months before her death. They also posted on their website and Facebook that this would be the title for their fifth studio album. In March, the group published a 32-minute video to their YouTube page titled Interview 2016, which shares its name with their second EP; the video shows the group being interviewed by Matthew Hoffman of Tuesdays With Matthew, an online volunteer project that aims to combat loneliness in elderly people by recruiting them to act in recreations of famous movie scenes. However, all of the interview's audio is replaced by the album's songs, while the EP's cover art consists solely of a picture of Hoffman looking into the camera. Death Grips uploaded their third EP, Steroids (Crouching Tiger Hidden Gabber Megamix), to their YouTube channel in May 2017; the EP consists of a single 22-minute song of the same name. Following this, the group co-headlined an autumn U.S. tour with industrial metal band Ministry.

In March 2018, Death Grips posted images on social media outlining that they were "working on the new album" titled Year of the Snitch with Australian noise artist Lucas Abela, New Zealand film director Andrew Adamson, and English musician Justin Chancellor (best known as the bassist for Tool). In April, Death Grips uploaded a video to their YouTube channel writing the track listing for the new album with text messages.

In May 2018, Death Grips uploaded the singles "Streaky", "Black Paint", and "Flies". In June, they uploaded a single titled "Hahaha", as well as an accompanying tweet announcing the release date for Year of the Snitch as June 22. A week later, the group released another two singles: "Dilemma", featuring Andrew Adamson, and "Shitshow". On June 21, Year of the Snitch was systematically made available on streaming services at 12:00 AM NZST on June 22, which led to listeners spreading differing versions of the album hours before its full scheduled rollout. The group also tweeted the album being "leaked". The following day, Year of the Snitch was officially released.

On June 21, 2019, Death Grips released a 30-minute mix titled Gmail and the Restraining Orders as part of Warp Records' 30th anniversary celebrations.

=== 2019–2025: Re-releases, 2023 tour ===
In contrast with the band's consistent output of yearly releases during the 2010s, Death Grips' activity was relatively quiet during the early 2020s, with most of the band's online presence being relegated to unannounced re-releases of previous material. On January 29, 2021, Gmail and the Restraining Orders and "More Than the Fairy", a 2016 non-album single featuring Les Claypool, were released on streaming services. On July 11, 2022, Death Grips also released "Live from Death Valley", a two track single from 2011, to streaming services.

On May 12, 2022, Death Grips published a cryptic video of a moth with a heavy trance background, presumed to be a teaser for new music. In November 2022, Death Grips were announced as participants in the Sick New World, Outbreak Fest and Primavera Sound music festivals scheduled for summer 2023. These announcements were followed in December 2022 by the confirmation of a North American tour, the band's first in four years, scheduled from May to October 2023.

Sometime in February 2023, Death Grips' website was overhauled and featured a new redesign; through this, two MP3 files for "True Vulture" and "The Bug Death Grips FULL MIXX" were discovered on the website's server files searcher, making the two tracks the first new, unheard-of music from the band since 2018. In March, Death Grips released several lines of merchandise with the clothing brand Praying.

On May 4, 2023, Death Grips started a new nationwide tour at Portland's Revolution Hall, featuring a complete version of the track that had been previously teased in the aforementioned moth clip. On October 13, 2023, the band walked off stage early in the middle of a performance in Fayetteville, Arkansas after being hit with glowsticks thrown by fans several times.

=== 2025–present: Upcoming seventh studio album ===
On February 8, 2025, direct messages purporting to be between Morin and an unidentified Instagram user leaked; allegedly, Morin wrote that MC Ride "[didn't] want to do any more" and that "truthfully none of us can ever predict what [would] happen with the group". On April 8, 2025, the band posted on their Instagram and X (formerly Twitter) that they remain active. The posts were signed by only Burnett and Hill.

On November 5, 2025, Death Grips announced on social media that they were in the process of recording a new album, with a post that included pictures of a studio. Yet again, Burnett and Hill were the only signatures listed.

== Style ==
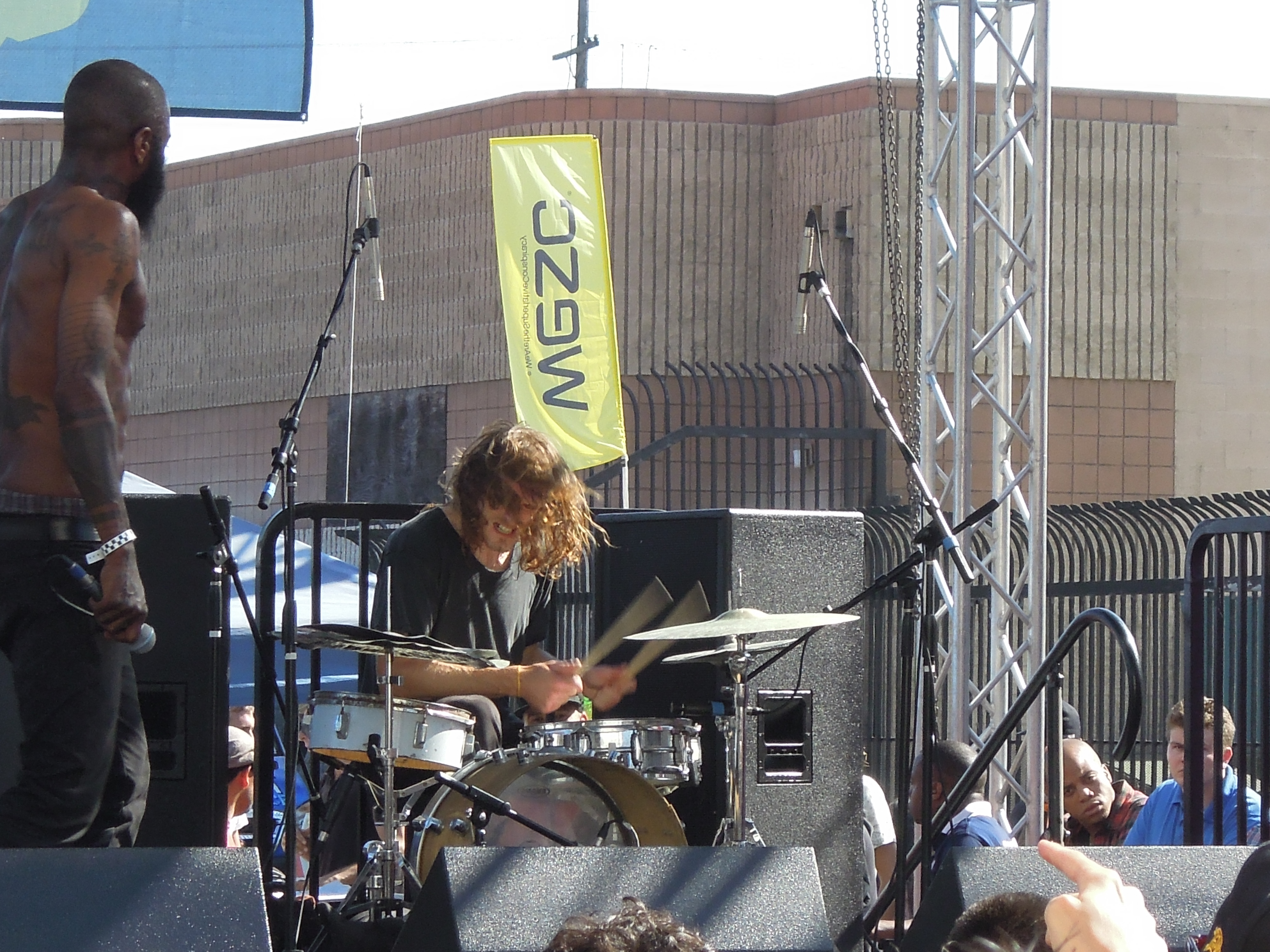
Ride (left) and Hill (right) performing in August 2011

Death Grips' music combines a variety of styles including hip-hop, punk rock, electronic, noise, and industrial. Their style has been variously categorized as experimental hip-hop, rap rock, electropunk, industrial hip-hop, and punk rap. The group is known for Ride's aggressive rapping style, alongside their noisy and often chaotic production style and bleak and cryptic lyrics. They also received attention for their highly energetic physical performances and stage presence. Their live performances were notable for antics such as their complete absence at one of their shows, Hill drumming to the point of severe injury or performing in handcuffs, Ride's intense and chaotic stage persona, and Morin's use of live sampling alongside his improvised synthesizer flourishes and violent dancing.

They are also notable for engaging in extended periods of live musical improvisation interwoven into their set as bridges between songs, typically performed on the fly by Morin and Hill. Ride has been known to adopt many different vocal styles on record and during live performances, such as shouting, screaming, spoken word-style talking, and whispering. Morin's unorthodox style of production and sampling and Hill's noisy, fast, and unconventional drumming styles and patterns are also distinct features of Death Grips' sound. The group is also notable for their distinctive and lo-fi visual style exhibited in their music videos, performances, and releases.

== Influence ==
The band remixed two of Björk's tracks for her remix album Bastards, released in 2012. She then recorded original vocal samples for the band, which they used on every track of Niggas on the Moon. Her contribution is credited as "found object". The song "Birds" from Government Plates features a guitar performance by Robert Pattinson, which Hill recorded on an iPhone and sampled into the song. Pattinson also appeared in a 2013 viral photo with the group and Beyoncé backstage at one of her concerts. Guitarist Sergio Pizzorno of Kasabian cited them as an influence for the band's album 48:13. According to David Bowie's collaborator, Donny McCaslin, Bowie was inspired by Death Grips while working on his final album, Blackstar.

== Members ==
Current members

- Stefan Burnett (MC Ride) – vocals (2010–present)
- Zach Hill – drums, electronic drums (2010–present)
- Andy Morin – keyboards, sampler (2010–present)

Touring musicians

- Nick Reinhart – guitars, sampler (2023–present)

== Discography ==
Studio albums

- The Money Store (2012)
- No Love Deep Web (2012)
- Government Plates (2013)
- The Powers That B (2015)
- Bottomless Pit (2016)
- Year of the Snitch (2018)
