= MC Ride =

American rapper

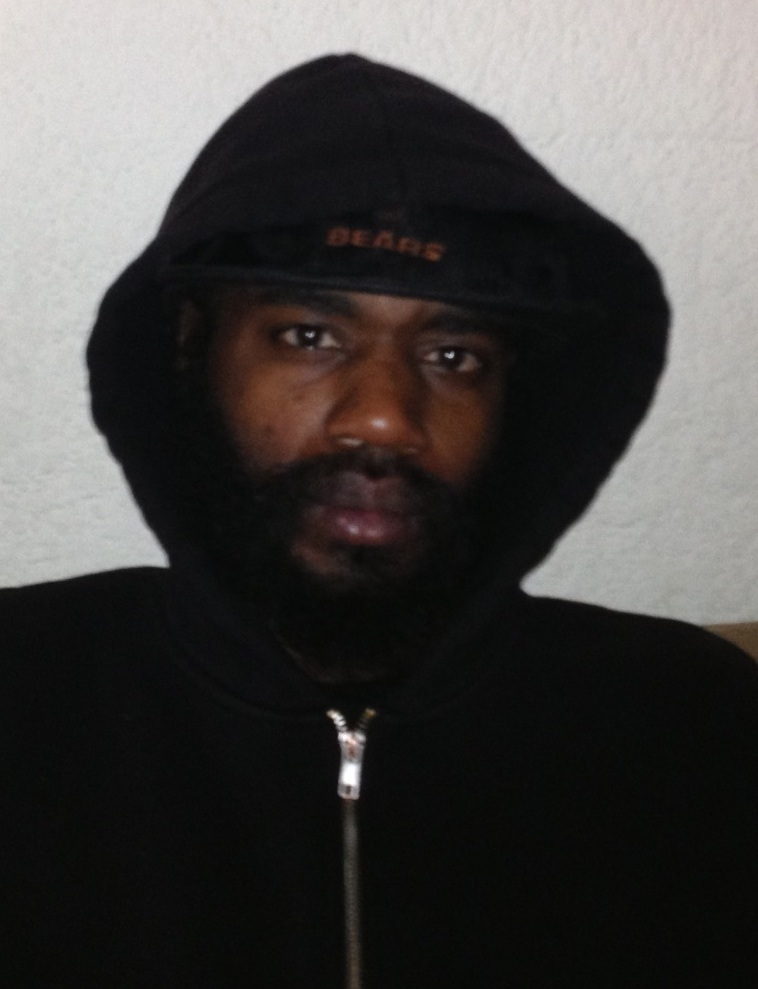
- Ride in 2014

Background information
- Also known as: Mxlplx; Ride
- Born: Stefan Corbin Burnett
- Origin: Sacramento, California, U.S.
- Genres: Hip hop; electronica; experimental hip hop; punk rap; digital hardcore
- Occupations: Rapper; songwriter; visual artist
- Instrument: Vocals
- Years active: c. 1998–2004; 2010–present
- Member of: Death Grips
- Formerly of: Fyre
- Website: stefanburnett.com

Stefan Corbin Burnett, better known by his stage name MC Ride or simply Ride, is an American rapper, songwriter, poet, and visual artist. He is the vocalist of the experimental hip hop group Death Grips.

He began his career in the late 1990s, before forming Death Grips with drummer Zach Hill and keyboardist Andy Morin in 2010. In his work with Death Grips, Ride has garnered attention for his aggressive rapping style and cryptic lyrics.

== Early life ==
Stefan Corbin Burnett was born in Sacramento, California, though much of his early life, including his birthday, is unclear. He studied visual arts at Hampton University in Hampton, Virginia, but dropped out to work with his brother, Isaac, who performs under the name Swank Daddy.

== Career ==
Burnett began performing under the alias Mxlplx, forming a hip hop trio called Fyre with his brother (Swank Daddy) and another Sacramento-based rapper called Young G. The project came to an end after his brother married and was unable to continue with the group. During this time, he worked at Paesano's Midtown and Pushkin's Bakery in Sacramento, and pursued a career as a painter.

In 2010, Burnett took on the name "Ride" and formed Death Grips with his next door neighbor, Zach Hill, who was known for his drumming work with the band Hella and his session work. Hill soon brought friend and producer Andy Morin into the group, and they began working together. In March 2011, Death Grips released their self-titled debut EP. One month later, they released the mixtape Exmilitary, which received critical acclaim and attention from music publications. The group signed to Epic Records in 2012, and released their debut album, The Money Store, soon after.

In 2012, the group leaked its second album, No Love Deep Web, due to Epic Records' hesitance to release it until 2013. Epic Records responded by dropping them from the label. Death Grips subsequently released a third album, titled Government Plates, in 2013. They followed this up with their fourth album, the double album The Powers That B. The first disc, Niggas on the Moon, was released in 2014. Every track on the disc included vocal samples of Icelandic singer Björk.

On July 2, 2014, Death Grips announced their disbandment, stating that "Death Grips is over". This was followed up with the band's Twitter page posting a photo of the announcement of the break-up written on a napkin. The group re-emerged in January 2015 with the release of an instrumental soundtrack, Fashion Week. This was followed up with the release of Jenny Death, the second disc of The Powers That B, in March. Another instrumental project, Interview 2016, was released in March 2016. They released their fifth studio album, Bottomless Pit, in May 2016; it was their first full-length release that included vocals from Ride since their alleged disbandment.

Death Grips' next release, the EP Steroids (Crouching Tiger Hidden Gabber Megamix), a single 22-minute mix of eight separate songs, was released in May 2017. The band's sixth studio album, Year of the Snitch, was released in June 2018. In June 2019, Death Grips released a previously-unreleased megamix titled Gmail and the Restraining Orders for Warp Records' 30th anniversary.

== Artistry ==
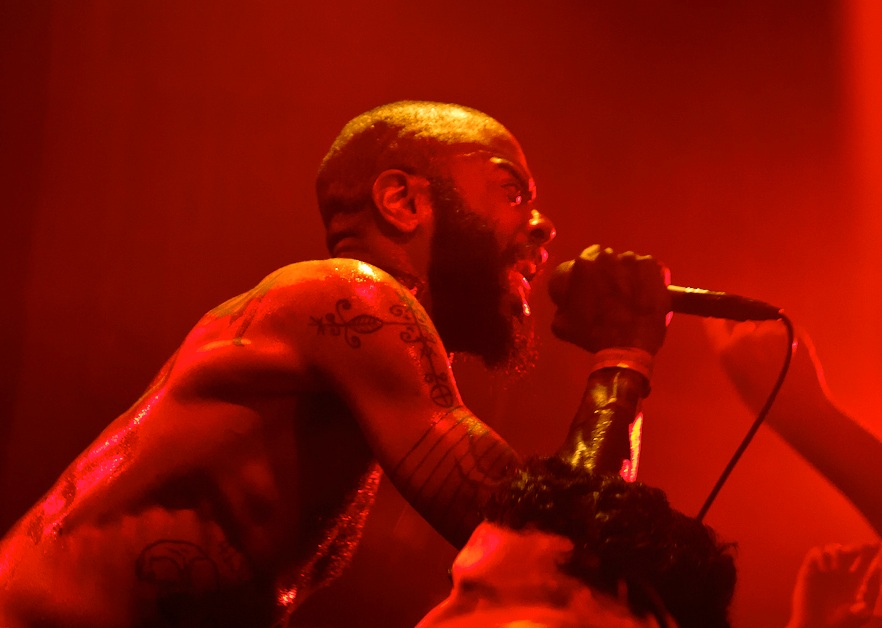
Ride performing with Death Grips in 2012

Ride's vocal delivery has been described as "(a) visceral and poetic form of rapping, resembling a blend of hardcore punk and spoken word performance". His style was also described as "paint-peeling barks and startling yelps". On his review for Death Grips' Exmilitary, Nate Patrin commented on Ride's vocals: "Monolithic and harsh, his voice sounds powerful doubling up the beats to the point where it doesn't even seem like a problem when it's halfway buried in the mix." Evan Rytelewski of The A.V. Club described Ride's voice as "another instrument of abrasion as he hollers in a voice so tattered and blown-out it must physically pain him".

Ride's lyrics are described as "chants and rants, rhythmic elements that are barely intelligible - though full of bleak, deranged, or drugged-out thoughts". Ride's lyrics engage with various topics, including sex, drugs, addiction, economic collapse, insanity, suicide, occultism, paranoia, and techno-futurism. John Calvert of The Quietus wrote, "Death Grips embroils MC Ride's consciousness in a schematised Braque-esque maze, a gloaming constellation, a synaptic thing." Chase Woodruff of Slant Magazine argued that Ride's lyrics "hint at a contemporary, vaguely political edge to all his rage and alienation". James Ubaghs of The Quietus wrote that Ride's "paranoid, politically charged ravings might not present any sort of solution to the world's myriad ills, but he is at the least paying close attention to how fucked things really are, and that's more than you can say for a lot of his contemporaries".

In a Pitchfork interview, Ride stated that although he has favorite musicians such as Jimi Hendrix, he takes more inspiration from his internal struggles than human achievements. He has a side career as a visual artist. His art consists of dark, monochromatic portraits. His first exhibition took place at Slow Culture in Los Angeles' Chinatown from January 7 to January 28, 2017.

== Personal life ==
Contrary to his aggressive rap style, Burnett appears to be soft-spoken in interviews. In a 2012 interview with Spin, he said, "I'm a very private person, I have very few people that I call my friends. I'm very distrustful of human beings in general; I'm very distrustful of media. I have no interest in sharing my personal life with the world. Zero." He has been described as "reclusive" and "super private" by his bandmate Zach Hill.

== Discography ==
with Death Grips

- Exmilitary (2011)
- The Money Store (2012)
- No Love Deep Web (2012)
- Government Plates (2013)
- The Powers That B (2015)
- Bottomless Pit (2016)
- Year of the Snitch (2018)

with Fyre

- I (1998)
- III (1999)
- IV (1999)
- VIII (1999)
- Fyre X (2000)
- XII (2002)
- XIII (2002)
- XIV (2002)
