= Epic Records =

American record label

- Parent company: Sony Music Entertainment (2008–present); Previously: Columbia Records (1953–1987); CBS Records Group (1987–1991); Sony Music Entertainment, Inc. (1991–2004); Sony BMG Music Entertainment (2004–2008; 50%)
- Founded: 1950; 76 years ago
- Genre: Various
- Country of origin: United States
- Location: New York City
- Official website: epicrecords.com

Epic Records is an American record label owned by Sony Music Entertainment, a subsidiary of Sony Music Group, a subsidiary of Japanese conglomerate Sony Group Corporation. The label was founded predominantly as a jazz and classical music label in 1953, but later expanded its scope to include a more diverse range of genres, including pop, R&B, rock, and hip-hop. Epic's current artist roster includes Travis Scott, Future, 21 Savage, Tyla, Meghan Trainor, André 3000, Tori Kelly, Beam, Bia, Judas Priest, Sade, Lamb of God, Coi Leray, DDG, Doe Boy, Eddie Benjamin, Fiona Apple, Giveon, Headie One, Mariah the Scientist, Yolanda Adams, Tom Walker, and will.i.am.

== History ==
=== Beginnings ===
Epic Records was launched in 1953 by the Columbia Records unit of CBS, for the purpose of marketing jazz, pop, and classical music that did not fit the theme of its more mainstream Columbia label. Initial classical music releases were licensed from Philips Records, which distributed Columbia products in Europe. Pop talent on co-owned Okeh Records were transferred to Epic, which made Okeh a rhythm and blues label. Epic's bright yellow and black logo became a familiar trademark for many jazz and classical releases. This has included such notables as the Berlin Philharmonic, Charles Rosen, the Juilliard String Quartet, Antal Doráti conducting the Hague Philharmonic, and George Szell conducting the Cleveland Orchestra.

=== Expansion of genres and mainstream success ===
By 1960, Epic became better known for signing newer, fledgling acts. By the end of the 1960s, Epic earned its first gold records and had evolved into a formidable hit-making force in rock and roll, rhythm and blues, and country music. Among its many acts, it included Roy Hamilton, Bobby Vinton, the Dave Clark Five, the Hollies, Tammy Wynette, Donovan, the Yardbirds, Lulu, July, Helen Shapiro, Cliff Richard, and Jeff Beck. Several of the British artists on the Epic roster during the 1960s were the result of CBS's Epic/Okeh units' 1962 international distribution deal with EMI; Epic recordings were issued via this arrangement by EMI on the Columbia label. Other British artists appearing on Epic were a result of signings to the new UK CBS affiliate formed after the acquisition of Oriole Records (UK) in August 1964.

Epic was involved in a notable "trade" of artists. Graham Nash was signed to Epic because of his membership in The Hollies. When the newly formed Crosby, Stills & Nash wanted to sign with Atlantic Records, Ahmet Ertegun worked out a deal with Clive Davis whereby Richie Furay's new band Poco (having signed with Atlantic due to Furay's contract from being in Buffalo Springfield) would sign with Epic.

=== Corporate structure ===
During the 1960s, Epic oversaw the smaller subsidiary CBS labels including Okeh Records and Date Records. In 1968, Epic recordings began being distributed in the UK by CBS after the distribution deal with EMI expired that year; Epic itself launched in England around 1971.

Sony Corporation bought CBS Records in 1988, and the company was renamed Sony Music Entertainment in 1991. It began splitting European operations into two separate labels, Epic and Columbia, in 1992, with Sony Music Australia and New Zealand following suit in 1997.

In 2004, Sony merged with music distributor BMG, bringing Arista Records, Columbia Records, Epic Records, J Records, Jive Records, RCA Records, and Zomba Group of Companies to one parent company known as Sony BMG Music Entertainment. In 2008, Sony bought out BMG for $1.2 billion, bringing all affiliated labels together as Sony Music Entertainment International, SMEI. The merger was approved by the European Union in 2009.

=== 1980s–2010 ===
Epic Soundtrax was founded as a film soundtrack label in 1992. It was central to Epic's 1990s success, with 11 soundtrack releases cumulatively selling more than 40 million records over a three-year period. Notable releases included soundtrack albums for Honeymoon in Vegas, Singles, Sleepless in Seattle, Forrest Gump, Philadelphia and Judgment Night.

In 1999, Jennifer Lopez released her debut album On the 6 (as part of WORK Group), which was a critical and commercial success, going on to sell over 8 million copies worldwide. Lopez's sophomore album, J.Lo (2001), experienced similar—if not greater—success, initially selling over 8 million copies worldwide, and gaining multi-platinum status under Epic Records. The record spawned several international and domestic hits, including "Love Don't Cost a Thing", "I'm Real", "Play" and "Ain't it Funny". With her second album, Lopez became the first female solo artist, under the record company, to reach the number one spot on the Billboard 200. 2002's J to tha L–O! The Remixes was the first remix album to debut at number one on the Billboard 200, and became the fourth best-selling remix album of all time, behind albums by Michael Jackson, Madonna, and the Beatles. Furthermore, in the album's second week at number one, Lopez's remixed single "Ain't It Funny (Murder Remix)" (with Ja Rule) was also number one, making Lopez the only artist in history to have a number-one remix album and single in the same week. Lopez's third studio album This Is Me... Then, released in late 2002, was also a success, selling 6 million copies worldwide and peaking at number two on the Billboard 200. Lopez's first full-length Spanish debut, Como Ama Una Mujer, became the first Spanish-language debut album to enter the top 10 of the Billboard 200, and has sold 1 million copies worldwide. This was Lopez's final studio album under Epic before her move to Island Def Jam and Capitol Records; she released her first greatest hits compilation, Dance Again... the Hits, gaining critical success.

In February 2009, Sony Music chairman Rob Stringer appointed singer-songwriter Amanda Ghost as president of Epic. Ghost, who had successfully promoted James Blunt to Grammy Award-winning status, was an unconventional and controversial choice for president because she had no corporate executive experience. She was expected to reverse the trend of declining sales at Epic by promoting the label's newer and mid-tier artists such as Augustana. Stringer also merged Epic and Columbia to form the Columbia/Epic Label Group in 2009, with himself as acting chairman. Ghost scored hit records for the Fray, Modest Mouse, Matisyahu and Sean Kingston. However, she delayed the scheduled release of Shakira's album She Wolf by insisting that the album contain another song – "Give It Up to Me" featuring Lil Wayne and an uncredited Timbaland. This delay probably caused She Wolf to perform less well in the market. Epic staff members described Ghost as "abrasive" and a "loose cannon". She was fired in October 2010, with Stringer apologizing for his mistake: "I owe the people at Epic..."

=== 2011–present ===
In July 2011, L.A. Reid became the CEO of Epic Records, signing artists such as TLC, Toni Braxton, Cher Lloyd, Avril Lavigne, Outkast, Future, Yo Gotti, Ciara, Meghan Trainor, DJ Khaled and Travis Scott. Epic also signed the winners of The X Factor during the seasons that Reid appeared on the show.

In February 2012, Epic Records signed experimental hip hop trio Death Grips under the recommendation of then-executive vice president of marketing Angelica Cob-Baehler. The group released their debut album The Money Store on the label in April 2012. They were later dropped from the label following conflict due to cancelling a tour to work on their next album, No Love Deep Web, and releasing it for legal download on Peer-to-peer connection site BitTorrent to bypass Epic's desire to release it in 2013.

In 2013, Sylvia Rhone, former president of Universal Motown, launched the imprint Vested in Culture through Epic Records. A year later, she was named president of Epic.

In November 2014, Mosley Music Group created a joint venture with Sony Music, with marketing, publicity, distribution and overall label services provided by Epic. The joint venture was created due to Timbaland's previous co-collaboration with Reid on Michael Jackson's posthumous album, Xscape. Previously operated by Interscope Records, most of MMG's roster moved to Epic.

In 2015, Def Jam Recordings parted ways with Mariah Carey, who was reunited with Reid (whom she had worked with at Def Jam in 2004) at Epic. Carey's deals with both Def Jam and Epic were at a fraction of the $80 million deal she had previously signed with Virgin Records; Virgin later rescinded that deal after poor sales. That same month, it was announced that R&B group Jodeci had signed with the label and planned to release its first studio album in 20 years.

In 2015, Wondaland Records, singer Janelle Monáe's imprint, entered into a joint venture with Epic. Acts on Wondaland include Jidenna, St. Beauty, Deep Cotton and Roman GianArthur.

In 2016, Jennifer Lopez returned to Sony Music, six years after leaving in favor of Island Def Jam and Capitol Records. Lopez's multi-album deal reunited her with Reid, with whom she signed at Island Def Jam in 2010.

In January 2017, 21 Savage signed with Epic. On May 11, 2017, it was announced that Reid would exit as the label's CEO. Following his exit, it was reported that Reid had been accused of sexual harassment by multiple Epic employees.

On April 23, 2019, it was announced that Rhone had been appointed as chair and CEO of the label.In September 2025, Rhone announced that she would step down as chair and CEO of Epic Records at the end of the month, after more than a decade with the label. In April 2023, Sony Music UK announced the relaunch of Epic Records UK as one of its frontline labels, with former publishing executive Sarah Lockhart as president.

== Formerly and presently affiliated labels ==
- 550 Music (1993–2000)
- Blue Sky (1974–1983)
- Cactus Jack (2017–present)
- Caribou Records (1976–present)
- Cold Chillin' Records (1993–1998)
- Date Records (1960s)
- Duble Kick Entertainment (2010–2015)
- Epic Records Nashville (1993–2006)
- Epic Soundtrax (1992–1997)
- Epic Street (1993–1998)
- Cleveland International Records (1976–present)
- CTI Records (1980–present)
- Tuff City Records (1983–1984)
- Hidden Beach Records (1998–2007)
- Glacial Pace (mid-1990s)
- Invictus Records (1973–1976)
- Jet Records (1978–1983)
- Kirshner Records (1974–1983)
- Lucky Dog Records
- MJJ Music (1988–2001)
- Modhaus (2021–present)
- Nemperor Records (1977–1990)
- Ode Records (1967–1969, 1976–1979)
- OKeh Records (1965–1970, 1994–2000)
- Pasha Records (1979–1990)
- Philadelphia International Records (1971–1984)
- Portrait Records (1976–1992)
- Ruthless Records (1990, 1999–2009)
- Scotti Brothers (1979–1988)
- SOLAR Records (1989–1993)
- T-Neck Records (1972–1984)
- Tabu Records (1978–1991)
- Unlimited Gold (1978–1983)
- The WORK Group (1994–1999)
- Virgin Records (1976–1978, 1982–1986)
- We the Best Music Group (2018–2022)
- will.i.am Music Group (2020–present)

== Logos ==
Epic has gone through five different logos. Some logos were temporarily revived for period reissues. The years shown below list the time served as the label's primary logo.

First radial sound sunburst logo, 1953–1960

Second radial sound sunburst logo, 1960–1973, 1998–2005 (still used by Epic Records Japan)

Big "E" logo, 1972–1979

Gradient script logo, 1979–1990 (used in tandem with outlined script logo)

Outlined script logo, 1979–1990 (used in tandem with gradient script logo)

Stacked-record logo, 1990–1998

Simplified script logo, 2005–2011, 2016–present

Red print logo, 2011–2016 (still used in Japan)

== See also ==
- Epic Records Japan (Japanese branch of Epic Records)
- Immortal Records
- List of record labels
