= Exmilitary =

Mixtape by Death Grips
- Released: April 25, 2011
- Recorded: 2010–2011
- Genres: Rap rock; experimental hip-hop; industrial hip hop
- Length: 48:34
- Label: Self-released
- Producers: Death Grips: Zach Hill; Andy Morin

Death Grips chronology
Death Grips (2011)	Exmilitary (2011)	Live from Death Valley (2011)

Black Google
- Cover of Black Google

Singles from Exmilitary
- 1. "Guillotine" Released: August 3, 2011

Exmilitary, also known as Ex Military, is the debut mixtape by American experimental hip-hop band Death Grips, released for free on April 25, 2011, shortly after their debut EP, through the band's website.

The album was recorded from 2010 to 2011. it received universal acclaim from critics, due to its aggressive, abrasive, and unique sound.

A few months later, the band released "Black Google" for free through their website, which contained all the instrumentals and stems for the mixtape.

== Background ==
The mixtape was released for free through Death Grips's official website, thirdworlds.net, on April 25, 2011. It later appeared on the net label Grindcore Karaoke. It was simultaneously released through iTunes. The track "Guillotine" was released through iTunes on August 3, 2011. "Guillotine" has become one of the band's most recognized songs. Other tracks released with music videos include "Known for it", "Culture Shock", "Lord of the Game", "Spread Eagle Cross the Block", "Takyon (Death Yon)", and "Beware".

According to Andy Morin, the cover art is a photograph that an undisclosed Death Grips member "carried in their wallet for roughly 10 years straight [...] it's a power object". It was eventually identified as "Bearded Man at Oenpelli", a photo of an Aboriginal Australian man taken by Douglass Baglin in 1968 for his and David R. Moore's book The Dark Australians.

== Critical reception ==
Professional ratings
Aggregate scores
Source	Rating
Metacritic	82/100
Review scores
Source	Rating
Consequence of Sound	B
Drowned in Sound	9/10
The Guardian	4/5 stars
MSN Music (Expert Witness)	(3-star Honorable Mention)
No Ripcord	7/10
Pitchfork	7.5/10
RapReviews	8/10
Tom Hull – on the Web	B+

According to the review aggregator Metacritic, Exmilitary received "universal acclaim" based on a weighted average score of 82 out of 100 from seven critic scores. In one very positive review, John Calvert of Drowned in Sound focused on the mentality of the character that the album revolves around and how it reflects the inner nature of man, citing the lyricism and sound production as being focal points around this sound and style. Nate Patrin of Pitchfork gave Exmilitary a 7.5, describing the mixtape as "a bludgeoning slab of hostility" that avoids being an "overbearing mess".

== Black Google ==
On September 8, 2011, the band released a teaser video for an upcoming project titled Black Google. It was later released on the band's website for free and revealed to be all of the instrumentals, stems, and acapellas for fans to remix and record with. The cover of Black Google features a heavily darkened version of the cover of Exmilitary with the word "Exmilitary" replaced with "Black Google". Black Google, for the band itself, is a "portal to the deconstruction of Exmilitary."

== Track listing ==
All tracks are written by Death Grips.

No.	Title	Length
1.	"Beware"	5:53
2.	"Guillotine"	3:43
3.	"Spread Eagle Cross the Block"	3:52
4.	"Lord of the Game" (featuring Mexican Girl)	3:30
5.	"Takyon (Death Yon)"	2:48
6.	"Cut Throat (Instrumental)"	1:12
7.	"Klink"	3:22
8.	"Culture Shock"	4:21
9.	"5D"	0:43
10.	"Thru the Walls"	3:56
11.	"Known for It"	4:13
12.	"I Want It I Need It (Death Heated)"	6:11
13.	"Blood Creepin"	4:50
Total length:		48:34

== Personnel ==
Death Grips

- MC Ride – vocals
- Zach Hill – drums, percussion, production
- Andy Morin – keyboards, programming, production
- Mexican Girl – additional vocals (4)
