= Gone (Mono album) =

Gone: A Collection of EPs 2000–2007

Compilation album by Mono
- Released: 11 September 2007
- Recorded: 2000, 2005–2007
- Length: 76:31
- Labels: Temporary Residence Limited, TRR121
- Producer: Various

Mono chronology
The Phoenix Tree (2007)	Gone: A Collection of EPs 2000–2007 (2007)	Hymn to the Immortal Wind (2009)

Professional ratings
Review scores
Source	Rating
AllMusic	link

Gone: A Collection of EPs 2000–2007 is a compilation album by Japanese rock band Mono, released in 2007. It is a compilation of several EPs and non-album tracks, ordered chronologically. Limited to 3,000 copies, some of which are on colored vinyl.

== Track listing ==
No.	Title	Length
1.	"Finlandia"	8:07
2.	"Black Woods"	11:22
3.	"Yearning"	15:37
4.	"Memorie dal Futuro"	9:38
5.	"Due Foglie, Una Candela: Il Soffio del Vento"	3:47
6.	"Since I've Been Waiting For You"	2:51
7.	"Gone"	4:07
8.	"Black Rain"	9:17
9.	"Rainbow"	2:23
10.	"Little Boy (1945 - Future)"	9:28

== Notes ==
- Tracks 1 and 2 are from Hey, You. Track 3 is from the Mono/Pelican split (Later released on You Are There in 2006 with slight changes). Tracks 4 and 5 are from the Memorie dal Futuro 10" EP. Track 6 is from Temporary Residence's "Thankful" compilation. Tracks 7, 8, 9, and 10 are all from The Phoenix Tree EP.
