= Holy Ground: NYC Live with the Wordless Music Orchestra =

Live album by Mono
- Released: 27 April 2010
- Length: 83:09 (DVD only), 77:03 (CD only)
- Label: Temporary Residence Limited
- Producer: Matt Bayles

Mono chronology
Hymn to the Immortal Wind (2009)	Holy Ground: NYC Live with the Wordless Music Orchestra (2010)	For My Parents (2012)

Holy Ground: NYC Live with the Wordless Music Orchestra is a live album by Japanese post-rock band Mono, released 27 April 2010 on Temporary Residence Limited. The album features a DVD of live footage and a CD with live recordings of the performance.

== CD/DVD Track listing ==
No.	Title	Original album	Length
1.	"Ashes in the Snow"	Hymn to the Immortal Wind	12:55
2.	"Burial At Sea"	Hymn to the Immortal Wind	10:23
3.	"Silent Flight, Sleeping Dawn"	Hymn to the Immortal Wind	5:50
4.	"Are You There?"	You Are There	10:30
5.	"2 Candles, 1 Wish"	Walking Cloud and Deep Red Sky, Flag Fluttered and the Sun Shined	2:52
6.	"Where Am I"	One Step More and You Die	3:03
7.	"Pure as Snow (Trails of the Winter Storm)"	Hymn to the Immortal Wind	11:37
8.	"Follow the Map (not available on CD due to the limitations of runtime)"	Hymn to the Immortal Wind	4:52
9.	"Halcyon (Beautiful Days)"	Walking Cloud and Deep Red Sky, Flag Fluttered and the Sun Shined	9:17
10.	"Everlasting Light"	Hymn to the Immortal Wind	12:35
Total length:			83:09
