= Nick Reinhart =

American musician and songwriter

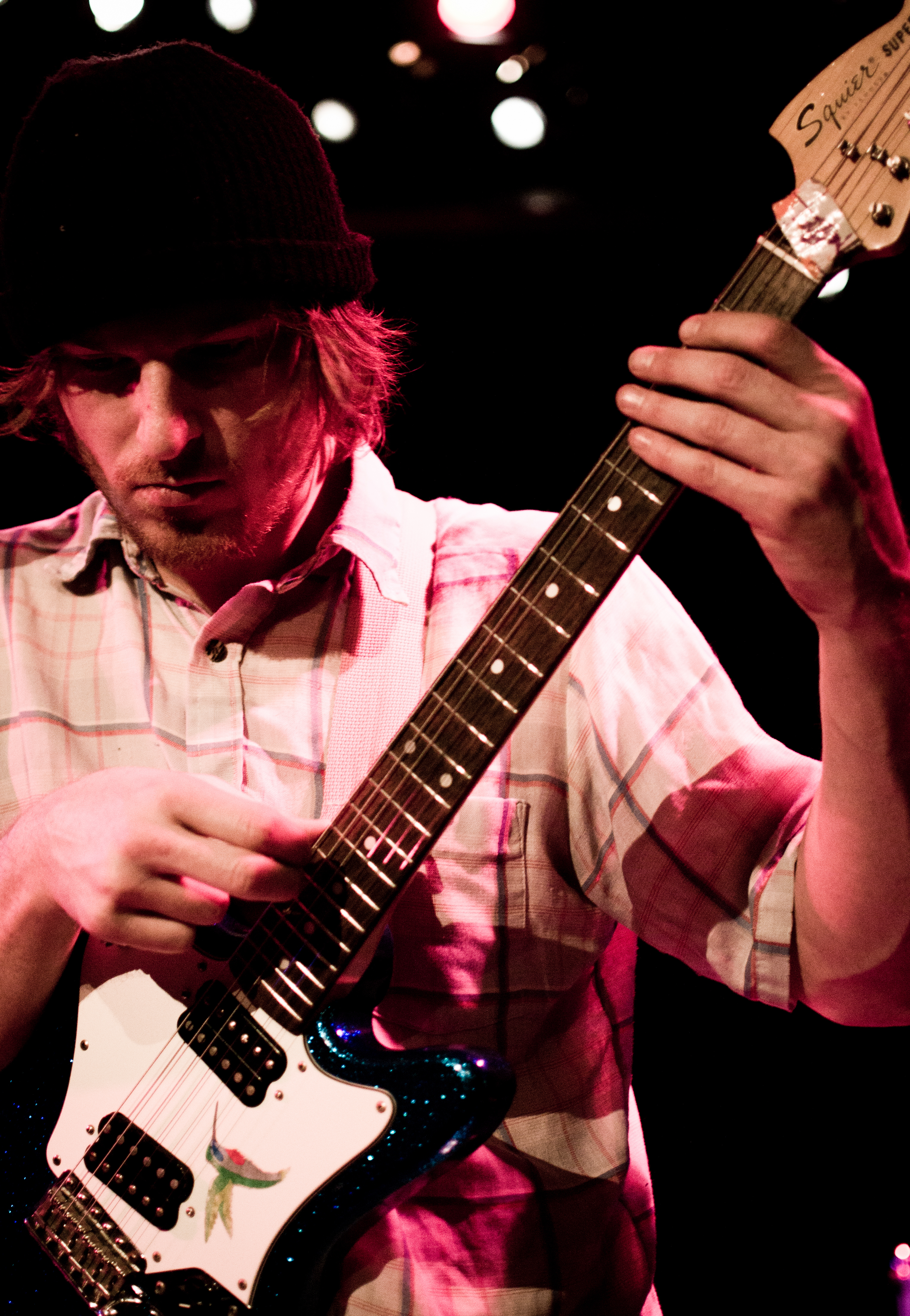
- Reinhart performing in 2014

Background information
- Born: May 21, 1983 (age 43)
- Origin: Sacramento, California, U.S.
- Genres: Indie rock; experimental rock; math rock; post-hardcore
- Instruments: Guitar; vocals; keyboards
- Years active: 1994–present
- Labels: Springman; Sargent House
- Member of: Tera Melos; Big Walnuts Yonder; Bygones; Undo K From Hot

Nick Reinhart (born May 21, 1983) is an American musician and songwriter. He is best known as the frontman and founding member of the band Tera Melos, and as the live guitarist for the experimental rap band, Death Grips. Reinhart is known for his unorthodox guitar playing style, characterized by quickly alternating rhythmic patterns and heavy use of guitar pedals and samplers. Aside from Tera Melos, Reinhart is also a member of the supergroup Big Walnuts Yonder, with whom he has released one album, and the collaborative project Bygones with Hella and Death Grips drummer Zach Hill.

== Discography ==
Solo Releases

- Satan's Power (2012)
- Scary Sounds (2013)
- Satan's Power II (2013)
- Scary Sounds II (2014)
- Satan's Power III (2014)
- Imaginary Friends (2015)
- Scary Sounds III (2015)
- Cellular Music (2019)
- Halloween Club (as Acid Fab) (2020)

=== With Tera Melos ===
- Untitled (2005) Springman, re-issued (2010) Sargent House
- Patagonian Rats (2010) Sargent House
- X'ed Out (2013) Sargent House
- Trash Generator (2017) Sargent House

=== With Big Walnuts Yonder ===
==== Albums ====
- Big Walnuts Yonder (2017)

=== With Bygones ===
==== Albums ====
- By- (with Zach Hill) (2009)
- Spiritual Bankruptcy (2010)

=== With Undo K From Hot ===
Albums

- G.A.S. Get a Star (2021)

=== With Death Grips ===
==== Albums ====
- Fashion Week (2015)
- The Powers That B (2015)
- Bottomless Pit (2016)
