= Travels in Constants =

Travels in Constants is a limited edition collection of 25 EPs issued by American record label Temporary Residence Limited. The label issued one CD from each artist involved in the project, which ran from 1999 until 2015. A large number of the artists involved have been signed to Temporary Residence for releases outside of the series (Eluvium, Explosions in the Sky, Mono) whilst some haven't had any other releases on the label (Mogwai, Songs: Ohia), and some artists on Temporary Residence have not released anything for the series.

#	Artist	Album title
1	By Water	Travels in Constants Vol. 1
2	Bonnevill	Travels in Constants Vol. 2: Bonnevill
3	Tarentel	Travels in Constants Vol. 3
4	Drona Parva	Travels in Constants Vol. 4
5	Papa M	Travels in Constants Vol. 5
6	Sonna	The Eventual Bow
7	Bonny Billy	More Revery
8	Paul Newman	Travels in Constants Vol. 8
9	Low	Travels in Constants (Vol. 9): The Exit Papers
10	Cerberus Shoal	Travels in Constants Vol. 10
11	Rumah Sakit	Travels in Constants Vol. 11
12	Mogwai	Travels in Constants, Vol. 12
13	Appendix Out	Travels in Constants Vol. 13
14	Songs: Ohia	Travels in Constants Vol. 14
15	Sybarite	Travels in Constants Vol. 15
16	At Right Angles	Travels in Constants Vol. 16
17	Kilowatthours	Travels in Constants Vol. 17
18	Colophon	Love Loops
19	The Drift	Travels in Constants Vol. 19
20	Eluvium	Travels in Constants Vol. 20
21	Explosions in the Sky	The Rescue
22	Mono	The Phoenix Tree
23	Christopher Flores	Testing the Blues
24	Adam Bryanbaum Wiltzie	Travels in Constants Vol. 24
25	Prefuse 73	Travels in Constants Vol. 25
