= Palmless Prayer / Mass Murder Refrain =

Studio album by Mono & World's End Girlfriend
- Released: 14 December 2005
- Genres: Post-rock, neoclassical, electronic music
- Length: 74:40
- Label: Human Highway Records
- Producers: Mono; World's End Girlfriend

Mono chronology
You Are There (2006)	Palmless Prayer / Mass Murder Refrain (2005)	Memorie dal Futuro (2006)

World's End Girlfriend chronology
The Lie Lay Land (2005)	Palmless Prayer / Mass Murder Refrain (2005)	Hurtbreak Wonderland (2007)

Palmless Prayer / Mass Murder Refrain is a collaborative studio album by Mono and World's End Girlfriend. It was originally released via Human Highway Records on 14 December 2005. In 2006, it was re-released via Temporary Residence Limited.

== Background ==
The project emerged shortly before Mono recorded their next major album, You Are There. While Mono was known for expansive, guitar-driven crescendos, World's End Girlfriend brought electronic and orchestral sensibilities to the collaboration. The album was recorded in multiple studios in Japan.

== Composition and concept ==
Palmless Prayer / Mass Murder Refrain is structured as a five-part suite, with each track untitled (sometimes written as Part. 1, Part. 2, other times as Trailer 1, Trailer 2). to reinforce a sense of continuous, evolving narrative. The album emphasizes musical restraint over explosive post-rock dynamics, featuring long instrumental passages, minimalistic arrangements, and gradual crescendos.

World's End Girlfriend’s orchestral and electronic contributions provide a haunting, cinematic atmosphere. Themes explored in the album include loneliness, despair, helplessness, and profound sadness. The final movement builds gradually to a massive crescendo before resolving quietly, reflecting the album's emotional arc.

== Themes and Interpretation ==
Critics describe the album as a meditation on existential grief. Its sparse, minimalistic passages allow for reflection, turning sorrow into something beautiful. The lack of track titles adds ambiguity, inviting individual interpretation.

== Critical reception ==
Professional ratings
Review scores
Source	Rating
AllMusic	3.5/5 stars
Brainwashed	favorable
Dusted Magazine	mixed
Exclaim!	favorable
The Japan Times	favorable
Stylus Magazine	A

Ian Mathers of Stylus Magazine gave the album a grade of "A", writing, "I'd say this is one of the finest 'imaginary soundtracks' ever released if I could just think of a film that wouldn't seem hideously overpowered by it."

Shawn Dspres of The Japan Times commented that "Although broken down into distinct parts, the seamless transition between tracks makes the album play out like one extended, breathtaking piece."

Thom Jurek of AllMusic gave the album 3.5 out of 5 stars, calling it "puzzling, bewildering and utterly beautiful."

In February 2007, American webzine Somewhere Cold voted Palmless Prayer / Mass Murder Refrain No. 7 on their 2006 Somewhere Cold Awards Hall of Fame.

== Legacy and reissues ==
The album is regarded as one of Mono's most introspective and genre-defying works. In 2025, it was reissued on vinyl for the first time in roughly 19 years, including a limited-edition iridescent gold vinyl.

== Track listing ==
No.	Title	Length
1.	"Palmless Prayer / Mass Murder Refrain Part.1"	12:15
2.	"Palmless Prayer / Mass Murder Refrain Part.2"	13:36
3.	"Palmless Prayer / Mass Murder Refrain Part.3"	17:03
4.	"Palmless Prayer / Mass Murder Refrain Part.4"	12:24
5.	"Palmless Prayer / Mass Murder Refrain Part.5"	19:13

== Personnel ==
Credits adapted from liner notes.

Mono

- Takaakira "Taka" Goto – music
- Yoda – music
- Tamaki – music
- Yasunori Takada – music

World's End Girlfriend

- Katsuhiko Maeda – music, recording, mixing

Additional musicians

- Mujika Easel – chorus vocals
- Takafumi Ishikawa – saxophone
- Kazumasa Hashimoto – piano
- Seigen Tokuzawa – cello
- Kaoru Hagiwara – viola
- Mikiko Ise – violin
- Mio Okamura – violin

Technical

- Seiji Ueki – recording
- Gondo Tomohiko – recording
- Yuuki Mizutani – recording
- Tetsuya Yamamoto – recording
- John Golden – mastering
- Chieko Akasaka – design
- Jeremy DeVine – design
- Chie Tatsumi – photography
