= Hymn to the Immortal Wind =

Studio album by Mono
- Released: 24 March 2009
- Studios: Electrical Audio; Chicago, Illinois, U.S.
- Length: 67:01
- Label: Temporary Residence Limited
- Producer: Steve Albini

Mono chronology
You Are There (2006)	Hymn to the Immortal Wind (2009)	Holy Ground: NYC Live With The Wordless Music Orchestra (2010)

Professional ratings
Aggregate scores
Source	Rating
Metacritic	75/100
Review scores
Source	Rating
AllMusic	4.5/5 stars
Alternative Press	4/5 stars
Kerrang!	4/5
NME	8/10
Pitchfork	7.0/10
PopMatters	7/10
Spin	5/10

Hymn to the Immortal Wind is the fifth studio album by Japanese post-rock band Mono, released 24 March 2009 on Temporary Residence Limited.

The album was recorded and mixed in June and November 2008 at the Electrical Audio Recording Studios, Chicago, Illinois, by Steve Albini. A music video for "Follow the Map" was released to promote the album. This is a concept album, and there is a short story enclosed with the CD to go along with the music.

== Track listing ==
All music is composed by Mono.

No.	Title	Length
1.	"Ashes in the Snow"	11:46
2.	"Burial at Sea"	10:39
3.	"Silent Flight, Sleeping Dawn"	6:00
4.	"Pure as Snow (Trails of the Winter Storm)"	11:26
5.	"Follow the Map"	3:56
6.	"The Battle to Heaven"	12:51
7.	"Everlasting Light"	10:23
Total length:		67:01

== Personnel ==
Mono

- Takaakira "Taka" Goto - electric guitars
- Tamaki Kunishi - bass guitar, piano, harpsichord, glockenspiel
- Yasunori Takada - drums, tympani, cymbals, glockenspiel
- Yoda - electric guitars, Hammond B3 organ

Production

- Steve Albini - recording, engineering, mixing
- John Golden - mastering

Orchestra

- Mark Anderson, cello
- Mellisa Bach, cello
- Eille Bakkum, viola
- Inger Petersen Carle, violin
- Alison Chesley, cello
- Dave Max Crawford, conductor
- Jennifer Clippert, flute
- Wendy Cotton, cello
- Margaret Daly, cello
- Michael Duggan, cello
- Katherine Hughes, cello
- Jill Kaeding, cello
- Carol Kalvonjian, violin
- Carmen Llop Kassinger, violin
- Kent Kessler, contrabass
- Andra Kulans, violin, viola
- Jody Livo, violin
- Ellen O'Hayer, cello
- Vannia Phillips, viola
- John Sagos, viola
- Mary Stolper, flute
- Ben Wedge, viola
- Steve Winkler, violin
- Susan Voelz, violin
- Paul Von Mertens, conductor
- Jeff Yang, violin
- Richard Yeo, cello
- Chie Yoshinaka, violin
