= For My Parents =

Studio album by Mono
- Released: 4 September 2012
- Recorded: Waterfront Studios, Hudson, New York
- Length: 55:37
- Label: Temporary Residence Limited

Mono chronology
Holy Ground: NYC Live With The Wordless Music Orchestra (2010)	For My Parents (2012)	The Last Dawn (2014)

Professional ratings
Aggregate scores
Source	Rating
Metacritic	75/100
Review scores
Source	Rating
AllMusic	4/5 stars
Consequence of Sound	3.5/5 stars
Drowned in Sound	8/10
Now	4/5 stars
Pitchfork	5.4/10
Rock Sound	7/10
Sputnikmusic	3.5/5

For My Parents is the sixth full-length album from Japanese post-rock band Mono. It was released in September 2012. The band also released a video for the opening song "Legend" titled "Legend: A Journey Through Iceland." The video was directed by Henry Jun Wah Lee.

== Reception ==
For My Parents received positive reviews, Drowned in Sound said 'The band has progressed to a point where their work sounds unique, and now they'll continue to painstakingly develop every aspect of that work with each release' and Consequence of Sound said 'For My Parents isn’t likely to go down with your Slow Riot for New Zerø Kanadas or Spiderlands, but there are times when it seems to break new ground, amounting to maximal yet clearly produced spectacle that only a band as musically cognizant and technically fluent as Mono could muster'.

== Track listing ==
No.	Title	Length
1.	"Legend"	11:57
2.	"Nostalgia"	12:03
3.	"Dream Odyssey"	8:10
4.	"Unseen Harbor"	14:02
5.	"A Quiet Place (Together We Go)"	9:25

== Personnel ==
Mono

- Takaakira "Taka" Goto – Guitar
- Tamaki Kunishi – Bass, Piano, Glockenspiel
- Yoda – Guitar
- Yasunori Takada – Drums, Glockenspiel, Timpani, Tubular Bell, Gong

Production

- Henry Hirsch – Recorded
- Rachel Alina – Assisted
- Fred Weaver – Mixed
- Bob Weston – Mastered

The Holy Ground Orchestra

- Jeff Milarsky – Conductor
- Yuki Numata, Courtney Orlando, Emily Ondracek, Patti Kilroy – Violin 1
- Conrad Harris, Ben Russel, Caroline Shaw, Amanda Lo – Violin 2
- Caleb Burhans, Nadia Sirota, Erin Wight, Jeanann Dara – Viola
- Clarice Jensen, Brian Snow – Cello 1
- Caitlin Sullivan, Laura Metcalf – Cello 2
- Logan Coale – Bass
- Shayna Dunkelman – Timpani
- Yuri Yamashita – Cymbals
