= Smile and the World Smiles with You =

Studio album by Sonna
- Released: 2003
- Genre: Post-rock
- Label: Temporary Residence Limited
- Producer: Steve Albini

Sonna chronology
We Sing Loud Sing Soft Tonight (2001)	Smile and the World Smiles with You (2003)

Professional ratings
Review scores
Source	Rating
Allmusic	link
BBC	Positive link

Smile and the World Smiles With You is the second full-length album by the post-rock band Sonna.

== Track listing ==
1. "Frone Taj"
2. "Open Ended"
3. "One Most Memorable"
4. "The Right Age"
5. "Smile"
6. "And the World Smiles with You"
