= Tangents (band) =

Australian band

Tangents is an Australian band, currently signed to Temporary Residence Limited. Their music incorporates elements of jazz, free improvisation, post-rock, and electronic music.

Tangents was founded in 2010, and the group released its first album, I, in 2013; the record was mastered by Chicago-based producer Casey Rice. After touring with Mono in 2015, they signed with Temporary Residence and released their second album Stateless with the label in mid-2016. While I was largely recorded live in the studio, Stateless was put together from improvisations that were digitally manipulated and then put together.

In 2018, the group released a third album, New Bodies.

== Members ==
- Adrian Lim-Klumpes – keyboards, marimba, vibraphone (2010-present)
- Ollie Brown – computer, synths, electronic instruments (2010-present)
- Peter Hollo – cello, effects (2010-present)
- Evan Dorrian – drum kit, percussion, synths (2010-present)
- Shoeb (Sia) Ahmad – guitar, effects (2010-2020)

== Discography ==
- I (Heliosquare Recordings, 2013)
- Stateless (Temporary Residence, 2016)
- New Bodies (Temporary Residence, 2018)
- Stents + Arteries EP (Temporary Residence, 2018)
- Risk Reaps Reward EP (Temporary Residence, 2020)
- Timeslips, digital-only (Temporary Residence, 2020)
- Timeslips & Chimeras (Temporary Residence, 2021)
