= The Exit Papers =

EP by Low
- Released: 2000
- Genre: Slowcore
- Length: 28:44
- Label: Temporary Residence Limited

Low chronology
Dinosaur Act (2000)	The Exit Papers (2000)	Things We Lost in the Fire (2001)

The Exit Papers is an EP by Duluth, Minnesota, slowcore group Low, released in 2000. It was recorded at 20 Below, Duluth and mastered at Third Ear. Known as "a soundtrack to an imaginary film", the band sent their copies to movie makers and executives in hopes of getting work writing soundtrack music.

The EP was the ninth volume in the Travels in Constants series by Temporary Residence Limited.

== Track listing ==
No.	Title	Length
1.	"Untitled"	3:37
2.	"Untitled"	2:27
3.	"Untitled"	3:22
4.	"Untitled"	14:43
5.	"Untitled"	3:17
6.	"Untitled"	1:18
Total length:		28:44
