= The Phoenix Tree (EP) =

EP by Mono
- Released: 18 April 2007
- Recorded: Electrical Audio; Chicago, Illinois, U.S.
- Label: Temporary Residence Limited
- Producer: Mono

Mono chronology
Memorie dal Futuro (2006)	The Phoenix Tree (2007)	Gone (2007)

The Phoenix Tree is the third EP from Japanese post-rock band Mono. It was released in April 2007 through Temporary Residence Limited. It is part of a collection of EP's released by Temporary Residence Limited, Travels in Constants.

== Track listing ==
All music is composed by Mono.

No.	Title	Length
1.	"Gone"	4:06
2.	"Black Rain"	9:20
3.	"Rainbow"	2:23
4.	"Little Boy (1945 - Future)"	9:28
Total length:		25:17
