= Untethered =

Untethered is any technique that facilitates an action of a technical device without a direct control.

Specifically it may refer to:

- Untethered regimen, a technique combining the use of an insulin pump with a slow-acting insulin analog
- "Untethered" (Law & Order: Criminal Intent), 2007
- Untethered jailbreak, a type of iOS jailbreak that allows a device to boot up jailbroken every time it is rebooted. This does NOT require a “re-jailbreaking” process. The only way to get rid of a jailbreak using this process is to restore the device.

== See also ==
- Tether (disambiguation)
