= Tether (disambiguation) =

A tether is a cord, fixture, or flexible attachment that secures something movable to something else.

Tether may also refer to:

== Economy ==
- Tether Limited– a financial technology company that issues the Tether stablecoin (USDT)

== Science and technology ==
- Tether (cell biology), an elongated cylinder of the membrane of a cell bond to a substrate
- Molecular tether

=== Computing ===
- Tethering, sharing a mobile device's internet connection
- Tether (cryptocurrency), a cryptocurrency
- Tethered jailbreak, in iOS jailbreaking

=== Space ===
- Space tether, use of tethers to propel or stabilize objects in space
  - Electrodynamic tether, a conductive space tether which generates current and acts against a planetary magnetic field
  - Momentum exchange tether, a kind of space tether
    - Skyhook (structure), or a tidal stabilized tether
  - Space elevator, a geostationary orbital tether

== Songs ==
- "Tether" (song), by Eric Prydz, 2015
- "Tether", by Chvrches from The Bones of What You Believe, 2013
- "Tether", by Damien Jurado from Where Shall You Take Me?, 2003
- "Tether", by Dreamers of the Ghetto from Enemy/Lover, 2011
- "Tether", by the Indigo Girls from All That We Let In, 2004
- "Tether", by On Broken Wings from Number One Beautiful, 2001
- "Tether", by Plaid from Reachy Prints, 2014
- "Tether", by Sarah Harmer from All of Our Names, 2004
- "Tether", by Tantric from Mercury Retrograde, 2018

== Other uses ==
- Ankle monitor or tether, used to track parolees' whereabouts and/or alcohol use
- Tether (hieroglyph), an alphabetic uniliteral sign of ancient Egypt
- Anthony Tether (born ca. 1941), Director of the Defense Advanced Research Projects Agency

== See also ==
- Tethersonde, a radiosonde attached to a fixed or tethered balloon
- Teather (disambiguation)
- Mind at the End of Its Tether, a book by H.G. Wells
- Tying (disambiguation)
- Tether (album)
