= We Sing Loud Sing Soft Tonight =

Studio album by Sonna
- Released: May 29, 2001
- Studio: Electrical Audio
- Genre: Post-rock
- Label: Temporary Residence Limited
- Producer: Steve Albini

Sonna chronology
We Sing Loud Sing Soft Tonight (2001)	Smile and the World Smiles with You (2003)

Professional ratings
Review scores
Source	Rating
Allmusic	link
Pitchfork Media	5.7/10 link

We Sing Loud Sing Soft Tonight (stylised in the packaging as ~~We Sing Loud~~ Sing Soft Tonight) is the first full-length album by post-rock band Sonna.

== Track listing ==
No.	Title	Length
1.	"The Opener"	9:13
2.	"Low And To The Side"	6:23
3.	"We Sing Loud"	7:28
4.	"Sing Soft Tonight"	8:09
5.	"Sleep On It"	9:32
6.	"Real Quiet"	4:52

== Personnel ==
Sonna

- Drew Nelson – bass, piano, Rhodes
- Jim Redd – drums, guitar, Rhodes
- Jeremy DeVine – guitar
- Chris Mackie – guitar, vocals

Other personnel

- Steve Albini – recording engineer
- John Golden – mastering
