= Kazumasa Hashimoto =

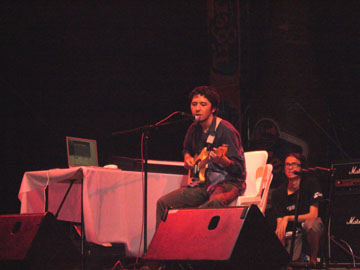
- Kazumasa Hashimoto playing his musical instrument

Background information
- Origin: Tokyo, Japan
- Genres: Electronic
- Years active: 2001–present
- Label: Noble
- Website: home.att.ne.jp/star/bd

Kazumasa Hashimoto (born 1974 in Tokyo, Japan) is a Japanese composer, mastering engineer and web designer.

As a child, Hashimoto learned classical piano, starting to compose in high school while making music on his computer. He majored in composition at Tokyo College of Music. His minimalistic music is a rich blend of electronic textures and acoustic instruments such as cello, violin and clarinet. Hashimoto makes extensive use of the piano, as well as nonsense, collage-like lyrics constructed from digitally edited voice samples.

As a pianist he has collaborated with Japanese electronica artist World's End Girlfriend, world music artist Souichiro Suzuki, and singer Yukawa Shione. In 2005 he was featured on Childish Music, an anthology of music compiled by Ekkehard Ehlers in "an attempt to define a new genre" of "naive sounds". In 2008, Hashimoto scored the critically acclaimed film, Tokyo Sonata.

== Discography ==
- Yupi (2003)
- Epitaph (2004)
- Gllia (2006)
- Euphoriam (2007)
- "Tokyo Sonata" (2008)
- strangeness (2010)

== Contributions ==
- out (2001)
- warter garden (2003)
- cinema soundtrack ー間ー (2003)
- fork ends (2004)
- Childish Music (2005)
- We are all cotton hearted (2006)
- Realive (ice show) (2026)
