= Ben Lord =

American drummer

Ben Lord is the drummer for the Brooklyn noise rock band Up the Empire. He was previously the drummer for the bands Kilowatthours, Elliott, Bling Kong and Falling Forward.
