= Big Walnuts Yonder =

American indie rock supergroup

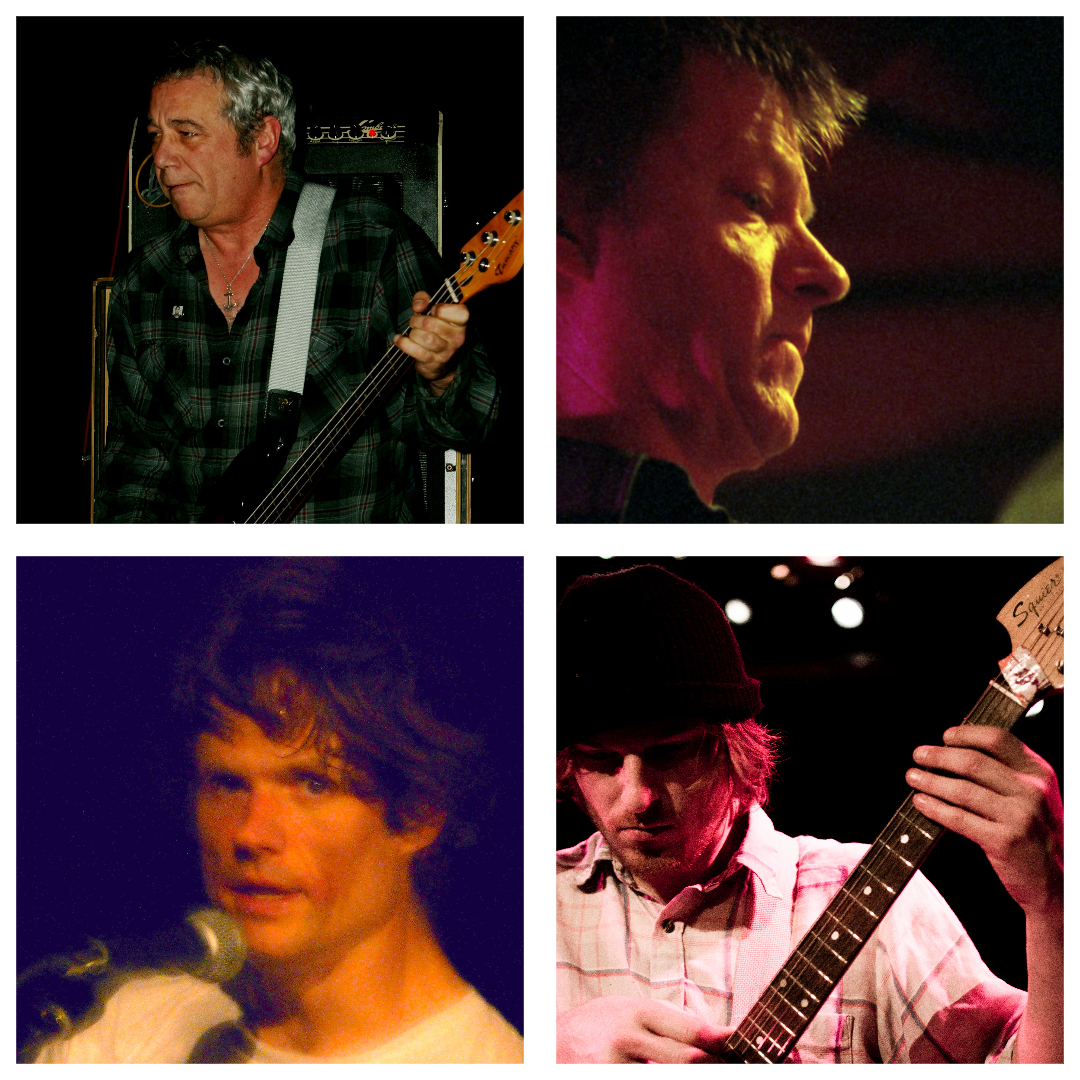
- Lineup of Big Walnuts Yonder. Clockwise from top left: Mike Watt, Nels Cline, Nick Reinhart, Greg Saunier

Background information
- Origin: Brooklyn, New York City, New York
- Genres: Indie rock
- Years active: 2008–present
- Label: Sargent House
- Members: Mike Watt; Nels Cline; Nick Reinhart; Greg Saunier

Big Walnuts Yonder is an American indie rock supergroup formed in 2008. The band consists of bassist/vocalist Mike Watt from Minutemen, guitarist Nels Cline from Wilco, drummer Greg Saunier from Deerhoof, and guitarist/vocalist Nick Reinhart from Tera Melos. Big Walnuts Yonder's self-titled debut album was released on May 5, 2017, via Sargent House.

== History ==
Watt's band The Missingmen and Reinhart's band Tera Melos were both in Ireland at the same time and the two got to talking backstage. Reinhart inquired about Watt's album Contemplating the Engine Room and expressed admiration for Nels Cline's work on it which inspired Watt to suggest the three of them ‘start a proj’. Reinhart suggested Greg Saunier to fill the drummer position to which Watt quickly agreed. It took two years for all four members to get their schedules aligned to start recording what became their first album, Big Walnuts Yonder. Although the album was recorded in 2014, it wasn't released until 2017.

== Discography ==
=== Albums ===
- Big Walnuts Yonder (2017)

=== Singles ===
- "Raise the Drawbridges?" (2017)
- "Sponge Bath" (2017)
