= Paterra =

Paterra is an Italian surname. Notable people with the surname include:

- Anthony E. Paterra - Majeure
- Greg Paterra (born 1967), American football player
- Herb Paterra (born 1940), American football player and coach
