= Under the Pipal Tree =

Studio album by Mono
- Released: 11 November 2001
- Studios: Studio Take-1 and Forty-4 (Tokyo); Fei Studio (Tokyo)
- Genre: Post-rock
- Length: 63:44
- Label: Tzadik
- Producer: Mono

Mono chronology
Hey, You (2000)	Under the Pipal Tree (2001)	One Step More and You Die (2003)

Professional ratings
Review scores
Source	Rating
AllMusic	4/5 stars

Under the Pipal Tree is the debut studio album by Japanese post-rock band Mono. It was released on 11 November 2001 on Tzadik Records.

In 2016, Under the Pipal Tree was included at number 30 on Fact's list of the best post-rock albums, while Paste ranked it the 18th best post-rock album.

== Track listing ==
All tracks are written by Mono.

No.	Title	Length
1.	"Karelia (Opus 2)"	12:30
2.	"The Kidnapper Bell"	10:00
3.	"Jackie Says"	7:31
4.	"Op Beach"	5:48
5.	"Holy"	1:40
6.	"Error #9"	12:30
7.	"L'America"	4:37
8.	"Human Highway"	9:05
