= Enemy/Lover =

Studio album by Dreamers of the Ghetto
- Released: October 4, 2011
- Genre: Rock; alternative; indie
- Length: 43:06
- Label: Temporary Residence Limited

Professional ratings
Review scores
Source	Rating
Allmusic	link
The A.V. Club	6.7/10 stars
Pitchfork	(7.6/10)

Enemy/Lover is the debut album of Dreamers of the Ghetto. It was recorded in 2011 in Bloomington, Indiana, at Russian Recording and was released through Temporary Residence Limited.

Dreamers of the Ghetto's first full-length album combines a mix of tight harmonies and soaring choruses. Paul Thompson of Pitchfork calls the album "mainstage big."

Every song on the album was written and performed by Dreamers of the Ghetto. Artwork was done by Jeremy Geddes.

== Track listing ==
1. "Antenna" – 1:55
2. "State of a Dream" – 3:08
3. "Connection" – 4:20
4. "Regulator" – 4:07
5. "Always" – 6:41
6. "Crime Scene" – 1:20
7. "Phone Call" – 5:21
8. "Dark Falcons" – 4:21
9. "Night Hawks" – 3:13
10. "The Canals of Our City" – 4:27
11. "Tether" – 7:26

== Personnel ==
- Luke Aaron Jones: vocals, bass, synthesizers
- Jonathan Jones: guitars, vocals, beats, synthesizers
- Lauren Jones: vocals, synthesizers
- Marty Sprowles: drums, beats, Thunder and Lightning
