= Big Walnuts Yonder (album) =

Studio album by Big Walnuts Yonder
- Released: May 5, 2017
- Recorded: July 12–14, 2014
- Studio: Studio G Brooklyn
- Genre: Indie rock
- Length: 37:25
- Label: Sargent House

Professional ratings
Aggregate scores
Source	Rating
Metacritic	72/100
Review scores
Source	Rating
The Spill Magazine	3/5 stars
Exclaim!	7/10 stars

Big Walnuts Yonder is an indie rock album released in 2017 by the eponymous supergroup. Big Walnuts Yonder consists of bassist/vocalist Mike Watt from Minutemen, guitarist Nels Cline from Wilco, drummer Greg Saunier from Deerhoof, and guitarist/vocalist Nick Reinhart from Tera Melos.

== Production ==
The album was recorded in three days during the summer of 2014 in Brooklyn, New York City, live with very limited overdubs and produced by Tony Maimone. Months later vocals were added with Reinhart handling seven and Watt performing two. Watt provided most of material by sharing rough versions of his compositions, or "launchpads" as he calls them, played on bass. On these tracks guitar was added after Watt's basslines, something that initially intimidated Reinhart but Cline was familiar with the method of composing having worked this way before with Watt on Contemplating the Engine Room. Cline and Saunier each contributed a track of their own.

Raymond Pettibon created the album art.

== Track listing ==
No.	Title	Length
1.	"All Against All"	02:18
2.	"Sponge Bath"	03:51
3.	"Flare Star Phantom"	08:48
4.	"I Got Marty Feldman Eyes"	03:28
5.	"Raise the Drawbridges?"	02:19
6.	"Ready to Pop!"	02:36
7.	"Forgot to Brush"	04:03
8.	"Rapid Driver Moon Inhaler"	03:33
9.	"Pud"	02:49
10.	"Heat Melter"	03:40

== Reception ==
Under the Radar's' Dustin Krcatovich's compared it to a "modern take on classic Beefheart" and praised the musicians ability to "combine weirdo prog-level precision and classic SST freakcore abandon" The Spill Magazine's Ljubinko Zivkovic gave it three out of five stars and called it "a mixed bag with some stellar moments." Justin Cober-Lake of Dusted praised the musicianship calling it "unsurprisingly unpredictable". Scott A. Gray of Exclaim! found some of the tracks indulgent but ultimately found "the majority of Big Walnuts Yonder is fantastic."
