= Tokyo Sonata =

- Film poster
- Directed by: Kiyoshi Kurosawa
- Written by: Kiyoshi Kurosawa; Max Mannix; Sachiko Tanaka
- Starring: Teruyuki Kagawa; Kyōko Koizumi; Yū Koyanagi; Kai Inowaki; Kanji Tsuda; Kōji Yakusho
- Cinematography: Akiko Ashizawa
- Edited by: Koichi Takahashi
- Music by: Kazumasa Hashimoto
- Release date: September 27, 2008 (Japan)
- Running time: 120 minutes
- Country: Japan
- Language: Japanese
- Budget: $2,500,000
- Box office: $940,430

Tokyo Sonata (Japanese: トウキョウソナタ) is a 2008 Japanese psychological drama film directed and co-written by Kiyoshi Kurosawa.

It stars Teruyuki Kagawa, Kyōko Koizumi, Yū Koyanagi and Kai Inowaki as an emotionally distant middle-class family of four who all individually come to question their life choices and futures. Kanji Tsuda, Kōji Yakusho and Haruka Igawa co-star in supporting roles.

Tokyo Sonata premiered in May 2008 at the Cannes Film Festival, where it won the Prix Un Certain Regard, before a theatrical release in Japan on September 27. The film received positive reviews, won Best Film and Best Screenwriter at the 3rd Asian Film Awards, and was nominated for Achievement in Directing and Best Screenplay at the 2nd Asia Pacific Screen Awards.

== Plot ==
Tokyo Sonata follows the Sasakis, a middle-class family in Tokyo: Ryūhei, his wife Megumi, who is a housewife, and their two sons, late teen Takashi and middle-schooler Kenji. The four are emotionally distant from each other and rarely share anything.

Ryūhei loses his good office job after his company decides to hire Chinese workers for cheaper, and grows increasingly desperate in his attempts to find a new job. He encounters an old classmate, Kurosu, who was downsized three months earlier and, like Ryūhei, hides the truth from his family. The two bond over their mutual suffering, until a stunned Ryūhei learns that Kurosu and his wife committed double suicide, thought to be initiated by Kurosu.

Driven by a desire to make the world a better place, Takashi leaves Japan to join the United States military, to Ryūhei's anger and Megumi's sadness. Kenji, who feels guilt for mistakenly causing his class to disrespect their teacher, wishes to learn to play the piano, but after his father's stern refusal, starts taking lessons in secret, paying with his lunch money and practicing on a broken keyboard he found in some garbage. Gradually, he develops a bond with his piano teacher, Miss Kaneko, who realizes he is gifted and urges him to pursue his musical ambitions. When Kenji's parents find out about the lessons, a furious Ryūhei physically abuses Kenji and accidentally pushes him down the stairs, resulting in a minor concussion.

One day, Megumi, who suffers from a lack of meaningful connections with those around her and worries for Takashi's well-being, is taken hostage by an unemployed man who broke into the family house looking for money. The desperate burglar forces her to drive a car he had stolen earlier, and while driving, he tells her about his failed business as a locksmith. Megumi claims she has to use the bathroom and they park at a mall, with Megumi going into the mall by herself, leaving the confused burglar behind in the car.

This happens to be the same mall where Ryūhei now works as a janitor. While Megumi is being kidnapped, Ryūhei is cleaning the bathrooms. He finds a fat envelope full of cash next to a toilet and quietly pockets it. Exiting the bathroom, he accidentally runs into Megumi. Distressed and mortified, Ryūhei flees, and Megumi returns to her captor who wonders aloud why she did not escape. She said they had a deal and the two decide to continue their travels with no particular destination.

That night, Kenji, Megumi and Ryūhei all have experiences away from home in which they confront the full extent of their existential disquiet: Kenji, who assisted in a friend's unsuccessful attempt to run away from his abusive father, tries to stowaway on a bus, but is caught. Unwilling to answer the policeman’s questions, Kenji is kept in an adult group cell overnight but is released the following day when the charges are dismissed. Megumi continues her journey with the burglar until they spend the night in a wood shed by the beach. Megumi resigns herself to the man’s sexual advances, but he is ultimately unable to go through with the act. She attempts to console him; however, when she spots a light on the horizon over the sea, the burglar despairs because he cannot see it. The next morning, the man has driven the stolen car into the ocean, and Megumi returns home. Meanwhile, Ryūhei, exhausted from fleeing from his wife, is victim to a hit and run and left for dead. He wakes up the next day with surprisingly only minor scrapes, and he drops the cash off in a nearby lost and found box.

Kenji, Megumi and Ryūhei all return to the family house, where they share an uneventful meal without mentioning their journeys or questioning the others, despite the house being in total disarray from the burglary. Four months later, the family has seemingly accepted the changes in their lives, with Ryūhei working hard as a mall janitor, and Takashi deciding to remain in the Middle East to continue his personal journey, even though Japan has recalled their citizens enrolled in the U.S. military. The final scene depicts Kenji playing Claude Debussy's "Clair de Lune" flawlessly at an audition. Moved to tears by his performance, his parents accompany him as the mesmerized crowd watches them leave.

== Cast ==
- Teruyuki Kagawa as Ryūhei Sasaki
- Kyōko Koizumi as Megumi Sasaki, Ryūhei's wife
- Yū Koyanagi as Takashi Sasaki, Ryūhei and Megumi's oldest son
- Kai Inowaki as Kenji Sasaki, Ryūhei and Megumi's second and youngest son
- Haruka Igawa as Miss Kaneko, Kenji's piano teacher
- Kanji Tsuda as Kurosu, an old school friend of Ryūhei
- Kōji Yakusho as the Robber
- Kazuya Kojima as Mr. Kobayashi, Kenji’s school teacher
- Yūki Minaki as Ryosuke
- Tao Tsuchiya as Kurosu Mika
- Gōichi Mine and Yoko Kobayashi-Baker as news announcers
- Denden and Kazuki Namioka as additional roles

== Reception ==
On the review aggregator website Rotten Tomatoes, 94% of 87 critics' reviews are positive. The website's consensus reads: "J-Horror director Kiyoshi Kurosawa turns successfully to dramedy and gives a unique (and specifically national) perspective to the universal subjects of family and identity." Metacritic, which uses a weighted average, assigned the film a score of 80 out of 100, based on 22 critics, indicating "generally favorable" reviews.

Peter Bradshaw of The Guardian gave the film 4 out of 5 stars, while Nick Schager of Slant Magazine gave it 3 out of 4 stars.

Christopher Bourne of Meniscus Magazine said, "Kurosawa's latest film, Tokyo Sonata, is his best in quite a few years, a truly frightening work that achieves its effects without resorting to tired genre mechanics." He also wrote that "Debussy's 'Clair de Lune' may well have never been put to better use in a film."

Meanwhile, Tom Mes of Midnight Eye said: "Tokyo Sonata is the ultimate expression of this quality of Kurosawa's cinema. As mentioned, it contains no supernatural elements, no ghosts, killers, or monstrous flora and fauna. Yet it is without doubt the most terrifying film Kiyoshi Kurosawa has ever made. It is terrifying because it is about us."

== Awards and nominations ==
List of Accolades
| Award / Film Festival | Category | Recipient(s) | Result |
|---|---|---|---|
| 61st Cannes Film Festival | Un Certain Regard - Jury Prize | Tokyo Sonata | Won |
| 44th Chicago International Film Festival | Jury Prize | Tokyo Sonata | Won |
| 3rd Asian Film Awards | Best Film | Tokyo Sonata | Won |
| 3rd Asian Film Awards | Best Screenwriter | Kiyoshi Kurosawa, Max Mannix, Sachiko Tanaka | Won |
| 30th Yokohama Film Festival | Best Cinematographer | Akiko Ashizawa | Won |
| 23rd Mar del Plata Festival | Best Director | Kiyoshi Kurosawa | Won |
| 10th Arab Asian Film Festival | Best Asian Film | Tokyo Sonata | Won |
| 9th Utica Film Festival | Best Asian Film | Tokyo Sonata | Won |
| 4th Osaka Cinema Festival | Best Film | Tokyo Sonata | Won |
| 4th Osaka Cinema Festival | Best Director | Kiyoshi Kurosawa | Won |
| 2nd Asia Pacific Screen Awards | Achievement in Directing | Kiyoshi Kurosawa | Nominated |
| 2nd Asia Pacific Screen Awards | Best Screenplay | Kiyoshi Kurosawa, Max Mannix, Sachiko Tanaka | Nominated |
| 33rd Hochi Film Awards | Best Leading Actress | Kyōko Koizumi | Won |
| 82nd Kinema Junpo Awards | Best Leading Actress | Kyōko Koizumi | Won |
| 82nd Kinema Junpo Awards | Best New Actor | Kai Inowaki | Won |
| Cinema Award | Best Film in 2008 | Tokyo Sonata | 5th place |
