= G.A.S. Get a Star =

Studio album by Undo K From Hot
- Released: May 7, 2021
- Genres: Industrial; hardcore; dance
- Length: 32:44
- Label: Self-released

Singles from G.A.S. Get a Star
- 1. "750 Dispel" Released: April 30, 2021

G.A.S. Get a Star is the debut studio album by American supergroup Undo K From Hot, consisting of Death Grips and Hella drummer Zach Hill, Tera Melos guitarist Nick Reinhart, and The Advantage guitarist Robby Moncrieff. Prior to the bands formation, Hill and Reinhart had collaborated in a band called Bygones, further, Reinhart had also joined Hill's band Death Grips as a touring and session musician. The album was first self-released on May 7, 2021.

The album was preceded by the single "750 Dispel" on April 30, 2021, and its music video on May 5, 2021, with Wren Graves of Consequence of Sound noting it as opening with wall of distorted guitar before "frenetic" percussion comes in, with "little in the way of legible lyrics." Moreover, Andrew Sacher of BrooklynVegan described the track as a noisy, glitchy, and abrasive electronic piece.

Chris DeVille described the album as "incorrigibly noisy, screamy, volatile electro-organic music that somehow still manifests some form of pop accessibility." Additionally, stating the record fused industrial, hardcore, "various glitchy dance genres", and buried elements of synthpop and new wave.

After the release of the album, the band has released three music videos for tracks on G.A.S. Get a Star: "Ziplock Quilts That Kill From Hot", "Missing Information", and "Get A Star".

== Track listing ==
G.A.S. Get a Star track listing
No.	Title	Writer(s)	Length
1.	"Ziplock Quilts That Kill From Hot"	Zach Hill; Bobby Moncrieff	3:34
2.	"750 Dispel"	Hill; Moncrieff; Nick Reinhart	3:39
3.	"Incomplete Spanks"	Hill; Moncrieff	3:29
4.	"Empty AM"	Hill; Moncrieff	3:23
5.	"Back Pages"	Hill; Moncrieff; Reinhart	3:29
6.	"Missing Information"	Hill; Moncrieff	4:02
7.	"Password Incest"	Hill; Moncrieff; Reinhart	4:07
8.	"Get a Star"	Hill; Moncrieff	3:32
9.	"Crosswalk"	Hill; Moncrieff	3:29
Total length:			32:44

== Personnel ==
Undo K From Hot

- Zach Hill
- Nick Reinhart
- Robby Moncrieff
