= Hey, You (EP) =

EP by Mono
- Released: 9 September 2000
- Recorded: Japan
- Length: 37:11
- Label: Forty-4

Mono chronology
Hey, You (2000)	Under the Pipal Tree (2001)

Hey, You is the debut EP of Japanese band Mono. "Karelia" and "L'America" also appear on their first full-length album, Under the Pipal Tree. "Finlandia" and "Black Woods" were later included on the compilation Gone: A Collection of EPs 2000-2007.

== Track listing ==
No.	Title	Length
1.	"Karelia"	13:07
2.	"Finlandia"	8:06
3.	"L'America"	4:39
4.	"Black Woods"	11:19

== Personnel ==
Mono

- Takaakira 'Taka' Goto – lead guitar
- Yoda (Hideki Suematsu) – rhythm guitar
- Tamaki Kunishi – bass
- Yasunori Takada – drums

Technical

- Tetsuya Morioka – engineer
- Toshiro Kai – engineer
- Masashi Yabuhara – mixer
- Cozy Noda – masterer
