= Seven Idiots =

Studio album by World's End Girlfriend
- Released: 14 September 2010
- Length: 79:43
- Label: Virgin Babylon Records
- Producer: World's End Girlfriend

World's End Girlfriend chronology
Hurtbreak Wonderland (2007)	Seven Idiots (2010)	Last Waltz (2016)

Seven Idiots is a studio album by World's End Girlfriend. It was originally released via Virgin Babylon Records in Japan on 14 September 2010. It peaked at number 86 on the Oricon Albums Chart. It was re-released via Erased Tapes Records in Europe and North America the following year. A music video was created for "Les Enfants du Paradis".

== Critical reception ==
Professional ratings
Review scores
Source	Rating
AllMusic	3.5/5 stars
PopMatters	9/10 stars

Jedd Beaudoin of PopMatters gave the album 9 out of 10 stars, commenting that "Japanese genius World's End Girlfriend returns with a seriously strange and beautiful range of songs, sounds, and styles on its latest release, Seven Idiots." Meanwhile, Ned Raggett of AllMusic gave the album 3.5 out of 5 stars, calling it "a series of achievements that are unquestionably technically impressive, yet ultimately tiring when piled one on top of the other."

== Track listing ==
All tracks are written by World's End Girlfriend.

No.	Title	Length
1.	"The Divine Comedy Reverse"	1:23
2.	"Les Enfants du Paradis"	7:13
3.	"Teen Age Ziggy"	5:03
4.	"Decalogue Minus 8"	6:51
5.	"Ulysses Gazer"	5:17
6.	"Helter Skelter Cha-Cha-Cha"	4:47
7.	"Galaxy Kid 666"	5:29
8.	"Bohemian Purgatory Part 1"	8:29
9.	"Bohemian Purgatory Part 2"	10:51
10.	"Bohemian Purgatory Part 3"	3:15
11.	"Der Spiegel im Spiegel im Spiegel"	4:33
12.	"The Offering Inferno"	8:33
13.	"Unfinished Finale Shed"	7:59

Pre-order edition bonus disc
No.	Title	Length
1.	"Virgin Babylon"	2:42
2.	"Anne"	12:14
3.	"Green Green"	2:20

== Personnel ==
Credits adapted from liner notes.

- World's End Girlfriend – music
- Katsuhiko Maeda – guitar
- Takuto Uzuno – guitar
- Mio Okamura – violin
- Seigen Tokuzawa – cello
- Ken-ichi Matsumoto – saxophone

== Charts ==
Chart	Peak position
Japanese Albums (Oricon)	86
