= Dreamers of the Ghetto =

American band

- Origin: Bloomington, Indiana, USA
- Years active: 2010–present
- Labels: Temporary Residence
- Members: Luke Jones; Jonathan Jones; Lauren Jones; Marty Sprowles

Dreamers of the Ghetto is an American band from Bloomington, Indiana.

== History ==
Band-members Luke and Lauren Jones were married, and Luke Jones is Jonathan's brother. Luke and Lauren, who had previously lived in Nashville, Tennessee, formed the band after moving to Indianapolis, where Jonathan lived. After adding Marty Sprowles to the lineup, the quartet began playing live shows in March 2010. The band's name is taken from a set of essays edited by Israel Zangwill, published in 1898. The group cut a demo which attracted the attention of the label Temporary Residence, and in mid-2011 the group recorded material for a web series run by Philadelphia-based radio station WXPN. Later in the year, the band was featured on KCRW's music blog, as well as on NPR's World Cafe: Next.

The band's debut album, Enemy/Lover, was released through Temporary Residence in October 2011, and received mixed critical reception. Allmusic likened elements of the group's sound to My Bloody Valentine, Vangelis, Working for a Nuclear Free City, The War on Drugs, and Simple Minds, and noted "singer Luke Jones's rough-edged voice is all about passion in a particular sense of the word." The A.V. Club compared the group to TV on the Radio and U2, describing the band's sound as "sturdy...but generic". In a mostly positive review, Pitchfork Media said the band "aren't seeking some midpoint between intimacy and grandiosity, they're aiming for both at once". Slant Magazine's review of the album was more critical, asserting that "the lack of dynamism between songs or across the album as a whole makes Enemy/Lover difficult to enjoy." PopMatters, in a mixed review, said of Enemy/Lover, "If there’s unifying criticism of this album, it’s just that too often this quartet is on its way somewhere, but doesn’t really seem to have mapped out the journey all that clearly", and attributed the album's shortcomings to "signs of a band that’s still finding its way".

== Members ==
- Luke Aaron Jones – vocals, bass, synthesizers
- Jonathan Jones – guitars, vocals, synthesizers, percussion
- Lauren Jones – synthesizers, backing vocals
- Marty Sprowles – drums, percussion

== Discography ==
- Enemy/Lover (Temporary Residence, 2011)
