= Walking Cloud and Deep Red Sky, Flag Fluttered and the Sun Shined =

Studio album by Mono
- Released: 14 April 2004
- Recorded: Chicago, Illinois
- Length: 58:25
- Label: Temporary Residence Limited
- Producer: Steve Albini

Mono chronology
| New York Soundtracks (2004) | Walking Cloud and Deep Red Sky, Flag Fluttered and the Sun Shined (2004) | Mono/Pelican (2005) |

Professional ratings
Aggregate scores
| Source | Rating |
|---|---|
| Metacritic | 62/100 |
Review scores
| Source | Rating |
| AllMusic | 4/5 stars |
| Pitchfork | (6.6/10) |
| Stylus | (C) |

Walking Cloud and Deep Red Sky, Flag Fluttered and the Sun Shined is an album by Mono, released in 2004.

The album comes with origami paper and instructions on how to fold a paper crane, a reference to the last track on the album: "A Thousand Paper Cranes".

== Track listing ==
| No. | Title | Length |
|---|---|---|
| 1. | "16.12" | 10:57 |
| 2. | "Mere Your Pathetique Light" | 6:36 |
| 3. | "Halcyon (Beautiful Days)" | 8:09 |
| 4. | "2 Candles, 1 Wish" | 2:47 |
| 5. | "Ode" | 7:06 |
| 6. | "The Sky Remains the Same as Ever" | 2:27 |
| 7. | "Lost Snow" | 15:12 |
| 8. | "A Thousand Paper Cranes" | 5:11 |

== Personnel ==
Mono

- Takaakira "Taka" Goto – lead guitar, string arrangements
- Yoda (Hideki Suematsu) – rhythm guitar
- Tamaki Kunishi – bass
- Yasunori Takada – drums

Additional musicians

- Inger Peterson Carle – violin
- Susan Voelz – violin
- Vannia Phillips – viola (tracks 2–3)
- John Sagos – viola (track 4)
- Alison Chesley – cello
- Udai Shika – string arrangements

Technical

- Steve Albini – engineer, mixer
- John Golden – masterer
