= Noble (record label) =

Japanese record label

Noble is a Japanese record label founded in 2001. Specializing in experimental electronic music, especially with influences from glitch and post-rock, artists from its roster have been influential and popular in the Japanese electronic music and post-rock scene.

== "Noble Sound" ==
Noble artists make up the bulk of a wave of Japanese electronic musicians whose work includes synthesized orchestral instruments, glitches in rhythm and samples, and chord progressions and harmonies characteristic of post-rock and shoegaze. Influences from ambient music are also very common, but still with the distinguishing feature of effects-treated samples and glitches. This sound is exemplified by World's End Girlfriend, Kashiwa Daisuke, and Kazumasa Hashimoto.

== Artists on roster ==
- Cinq
- Eisi
- Gutevolk
- Kashiwa Daisuke
- Kazumasa Hashimoto
- Midori Hirano
- Nakaban
- Natsume
- Piana
- Praezisa Rapid 3000
- Serph
- Tenniscoats
- World's End Girlfriend
- Yarn:moor
- Yasushi Yoshida
