= Teather =

Teather is a surname. Notable people with the surname include:

- Charlie Teather (1889–1948), Australian footballer
- Paul Teather (born 1977), former English footballer
- Robert Gordon Teather (1947–2004), officer of the Royal Canadian Mounted Police who was awarded the Cross of Valour
- Sarah Teather (born 1974), British politician

== See also ==
- Tether (disambiguation)
