= Pelican / Mono =

EP by Pelican / Mono
- Released: October 11, 2005
- Length: 31:31
- Label: Temporary Residence Limited (TRR89) Hydra Head Records (HH666-104)

Pelican / Mono chronology
Walking Cloud and Deep Red Sky, Flag Fluttered and the Sun Shined (2004)	Pelican / Mono (2005)	You Are There (2006)

Pelican / Mono is a split album by the Japanese band Mono and the American band Pelican. The 4,000 copies of this LP that were produced are limited to vinyl. In December 2005, American webzine Somewhere Cold voted Pelican / Mono Vinyl Release of the Year on their 2005 Somewhere Cold Awards Hall of Fame list.

== Track listing ==
No.	Title	Length
1.	"Ran Amber" (Pelican)	09:03
2.	"Angel Tears" (Pelican James Plotkin remix)	06:44
3.	"Yearning" (Mono)	15:44
Total length:		31:31
