= Miss Violetta Beauregarde =

Italian musician

Miss Violetta Beauregarde was the solo electronic-punk project by Italian performer/former model Cristina Gauri.

== Music ==
Violetta Beauregarde started by performing several concerts in Italy and Europe, and her first CD, Evidentemente non abito a San Francisco (Apparently I don't live in San Francisco), gained notable interest from the Italian music press. Her second record, Odi Profanum Vulgus et Arceo, has been released by Temporary Residence Limited as of September 2006. The record had some positive international recognition, and Beck notably ranked it second among his favourite records of 2006.

Violetta Beauregarde's music has been likened to that of Kid 606 or Atari Teenage Riot. It is composed with eclectic and often do-it-yourself music instrumentation, over which she screams her lyrics. Her live shows are notable for a degree of attitude and for shock acts such as throwing lamb heads in the crowd.

== Other activities ==
Gauri became first famous in the Italian musical scene also for having been the first Italian model for SuicideGirls under the nickname of Aiki.

She also ran an Italian blog, which was fairly known for the unique writing style and the strongly cynical, straightforward, outrageous opinions and language. Under the moniker "Heidi 666" she published a book, L'eterna lotta tra il Male e il Malissimo ("The eternal struggle between the Evil and the Really Evil")

Gauri also appeared in the Italian pornographic film Mucchio Selvaggio (directed by Matteo Swaitz) performing fellatio at minute 81.

In 2019 she started to work as a journalist (registered) for the extreme right-wing Italian news website Primato Nazionale, linked to the neo-fascist organization Casa Pound.

== Discography ==
- Evidentemente non abito a San Francisco (Anemic Dracula, 2004)
- Odi Profanum Vulgus et Arceo (Temporary Residence Ltd, 2006)
- Destroy Independent Music! (2006–2007, Temporary Residence Limited) sampler
