= Inanimate Sensation =

2015 single by Death Grips

Single by Death Grips

from the album Jenny Death (disc 2 of The Powers That B)
- Released: 27 January 2015
- Recorded: 2014
- Studio: Sunset Sound, Los Angeles
- Genre: Industrial hip hop
- Length: 6:05
- Label: Third Worlds; Harvest
- Songwriters: Stefan Burnett; Zach Hill; Andy Morin
- Producer: Andy Morin

Death Grips singles chronology
"Birds" (2013)	"Inanimate Sensation" (2015)	"No Love" (2014)

"Inanimate Sensation" is a song by the American experimental hip hop group Death Grips. It was released as the lead single from Jenny Death, the second disc of their fourth studio album The Powers That B (2015). The track debuted with an online video on December 9, 2014, several months after the band had announced an abrupt breakup during the album's rollout. Despite the breakup announcement, "Inanimate Sensation" was unveiled as a preview of the forthcoming album and later officially released for streaming on January 27, 2015. The song is noted for its aggressive sound and odd lyrics, and it became one of Death Grips' most acclaimed tracks upon release. Critics praised its production and experimental style, considering it a highlight of The Powers That B.

== Background and release ==
In July 2014, Death Grips announced that they ceased to exist as a group, even as they were in the middle of releasing a two-part double album titled The Powers That B. The first half of this project, Niggas on the Moon, had been released in June 2014, and the second half, Jenny Death, was still pending. Amid speculation about whether Jenny Death would ever surface, the band surprise released "Inanimate Sensation" online on December 9, 2014, as the first single from the album. The song appeared as a digital preview, accompanied by a video, giving a first preview of Jenny Death. This release came despite the band's earlier breakup statement, effectively teasing that their final album was soon to be released.

On January 27, 2015, the track was officially released through the band's Third Worlds label (in partnership with Harvest Records) as a streaming single. It helped build anticipation for the full Jenny Death album, which ultimately saw release in March 2015 as part of the complete The Powers That B double album.

== Composition and lyrics ==
"Inanimate Sensation" is an abrasive track that showcases a mix of industrial hip hop and experimental rock elements. The song opens with warped electronic tones and an erratic beat. Critics noted the heavy bass synth underpinning the song; Writer Andy O'Connor from Pitchfork praised its "seasick bass synths" and noted the shifting vocal textures from lead vocalist Stefan "MC Ride" Burnett. O'Connor further explains that throughout the track, MC Ride employs his trademark shouted delivery, along with chopped-and-screwed-style growls and occasional whispered asides, which created an unpredictable vocal performance. He likened the overall sound to a "Jock Jams for the underworld.

The structure of "Inanimate Sensation" is unconventional: it builds through several abrasive verses and breakdowns without a traditional pop chorus. The climax features MC Ride bellowing the line "I like my iPod more than fucking!", delivered over screeching electronics and static bursts. Pitchfork highlighted this lyric as a standout moment, calling it a "soon-to-be-immortal" catchphrase emblematic of the song's confrontational attitude. Lyrically, the song is cryptic; it touches on themes of digital alienation and overwhelming stimuli. Critics have interpreted the track as a commentary on modern disconnection; for example, Hanif Abdurraqib from Treble noted that, Burnett's lyrics often tackle "a world that becomes less and less socially engaged with each year," a theme exemplified by the tech-obsessed brashness of "Inanimate Sensation".

== Critical reception ==
"Inanimate Sensation" received widespread acclaim from music critics, who frequently cited it as one of the highlights of Jenny Death and of Death Grips' catalog during this period.

O'Connor's review of Jenny Death for Pitchfork singled out the track for its impact, noting that while nothing on the album quite reaches the "aggro-pop heights" of the band's earlier hit "I've Seen Footage," "'Inanimate Sensation' comes close," saying, "it's clear why it was released as the first single." The review praised the song's exhilarating progression and the varied vocal performance, emphasizing that Death Grips managed to harness their "unbridled energy" into a fully formed and memorable song on par with their best work. Similarly, Treble's Hanif Abdurraqib described the song as a "wild tirade," exemplifying how Jenny Death is a "fierce and potent collection" of tracks that reaffirm Death Grips' visceral style. Colin Fitzgerald for PopMatters described the song as "relentlessly intensifying" yet noting it succeeded at appealing to those who enjoy that aspect of Death Grips' work.

== Music video ==
The music video for "Inanimate Sensation" was released on December 9, 2014. Directed by the band members, the video has a surreal tone that amplifies the song's themes. It is set in what appears to be an empty indoor basketball arena at night. In the center of the arena's court lies a gigantic jumbotron that has crashed to the floor, tilting at an angle amid the debris. The entirety of the video's action is displayed on this fallen screen: as the song plays, the jumbotron flickers with distorted live footage of MC Ride performing the vocals, intercut with visual effects. Throughout the video, the camera perspective shifts to emphasize the scale of the fallen jumbotron and the emptiness of the arena. The screen's visuals are heavily filtered and warped: MC Ride's face and movements often appear in grayscale or high contrast, and at times the display shows repetitive images. These visuals glitch and loop in sync with the music's harsh beats and screeches.

== Personnel ==
Adapted from The Powers That B liner notes.

- Stefan "MC Ride" Burnett – vocals, lyrics
- Zach Hill – drums, V‑Drums, synthesizers, production, arrangement
- Andy "Flatlander" Morin – synthesizers, engineering, production
