= By the End of Tonight =

American instrumental rock band

- Also known as: BTEOT
- Origin: Alvin, Texas, United States
- Genres: Post-rock; Math rock Instrumental rock Experimental rock
- Years active: 2003 – 2009, 2011
- Labels: Temporary Residence Limited
- Past members: Stefan Mach; Brett Taylor; James Templeton; Jeff Wilson; Josh Smith; Jordan Brady
- Website: Official MySpace

By the End of Tonight (often abbreviated to BTEOT) was an American instrumental rock band from Alvin, Texas. They were signed to notable post-rock label Temporary Residence Limited for their life as a band.

== History ==
By the End of Tonight formed in 2003 by Stefan Mach, Josh Smith, James Templeton, and Jeff Wilson. In 2006 Brett Taylor replaced Josh in the guitar role.

They have toured with Anathallo, Tera Melos, Sleeping People, Buxton, O Pioneers, etc.

They were the only band ever to be signed by Temporary Residence Limited based only on a demo (in their case, ...In a Letter to the Sandbox)

Jeff Wilson left the band in early 2008. No replacement was ever found and the band announced through a Myspace bulletin in early 2009 after almost a year of inactivity that they had disbanded.

The band reunited in 2011 for one show on 3/5 at Fitzgerald's as well as a set at the Free Press Houston Summerfest 2011.

== Band members ==
- Stefan Mach - electric guitar (2003–2009, 2011)
- Josh Smith - electric guitar, keyboards (2003–2006)
- Brett Taylor - electric guitar (2006–2009, 2011)
- James Templeton - bass guitar, percussion (2003–2009, 2011)
- Jeff Wilson - drums (2003–2008, 2011)
- Jordan Brady - drums (2008–2009)

== Discography ==
Full-length releases

- 2005: A Tribute to Tigers - Temporary Residence Limited (Re-released in 2008)
- 2007: Complex Full of Phantoms (split album with Tera Melos) - Temporary Residence

EPs/demos

- 2003: ...In a Letter to the Sandbox - self-produced demo
- 2004: Fireworks on Ice EP - Temporary Residence
- 2007: "Sweet Junk" EP [split 7-inch with O Pioneers!]

Releases by individual members Three-inch CDEPs were recorded by each band member and issued as a limited four-part series, all released in 2006 on Temporary Residence.

- Part one: The Gunslinger EP (Stefan Mach)
- Part two: My Mom Caught Me in My Room Beat Boxin' (James Templeton)
- Part three: He's Home with Bones That Grow the Way They're Supposed To (Jeff Wilson)
- Part four: The Imaginary EP (Josh Smith)

Compilation appearances

Temporary Residence's "Thankful" compilation album includes the previously unreleased track "Ready? Aim. Fire!"
