= The Powers That B =

2015 studio album by Death Grips

Studio album by Death Grips
- Released: March 31, 2015
- Recorded: 2014–2015
- Studio: Sunset Sound Recorders
- Genres: Experimental hip-hop; glitch hop; rap rock
- Length: 80:45
- Labels: Third Worlds; Harvest
- Producer: Death Grips

Death Grips chronology
Fashion Week (2015)	The Powers That B (2015)	Interview 2016 (2016)

Death Grips studio album chronology
Government Plates (2013)	The Powers That B (2015)	Bottomless Pit (2016)

Singles from The Powers That B
- 1. "Inanimate Sensation" Released: January 27, 2015

Niggas on the Moon
- Disc 1: Niggas on the Moon

Jenny Death
- Disc 2: Jenny Death

The Powers That B is the fourth studio album, and first double album, by the experimental hip-hop group Death Grips. The album's first disc, Niggas on the Moon, was released as a free digital download on June 8, 2014. The first disc's instrumentation was performed entirely on a Roland V-Drum kit by drummer Zach Hill and features chopped vocal samples of Icelandic singer-songwriter Björk on every track. The second half, Jenny Death, leaked online on March 19, 2015. It features Nick Reinhart of Tera Melos, and Hill's former Legs on Earth bandmate, Julian Imsdahl, on guitar and organ respectively. The double album as a whole was officially released via Harvest Records on March 31, 2015.

== Background and release ==
On April 18, 2012, the Death Grips YouTube channel uploaded the music video for the single "I've Seen Footage" from The Money Store, which at the 2:16 and 2:26 mark for a single frame an early version of The Powers That B cover is visible while then appearing as the completed version at 3:14. Additionally in the same video, the opening shot for the screen in the "Inanimate Sensation" video can also be seen at the 2:26 mark for a single frame.

On January 19, 2014, Zach Hill posted to his Facebook page, stating that the group had begun recording a new album. On June 8, 2014, the first disc: Niggas on the Moon, was released as a free download via thirdworlds.net, Death Grips' official website. On June 9, 2014, Björk confirmed her vocal contributions, via various social media outlets. Death Grips officially announced the completion of The Powers That B via their Facebook page, as well as revealing the album artwork in October. On December 9, 2014, Death Grips released a music video for the album's only single, "Inanimate Sensation".

In anticipation of the album, the band released an instrumental soundtrack entitled Fashion Week in January 2015. The track list is as follows: "Runway J", "Runway E" and so on; acrostically spelling out the phrase "JENNY DEATH WHEN", in reference to the second disc of The Powers That B.

On February 13, 2015, Death Grips uploaded a new video to their YouTube channel. It showed the group, rehearsing the following songs: "I Break Mirrors with My Face in the United States", "Inanimate Sensation", "Turned Off", "Why a Bitch Gotta Lie" and "Lock Your Doors".

On March 10, 2015, thirty-second snippets of each song from Jenny Death leaked onto the internet, via Dutch retailer Bol.com. On March 11, 2015, the Jenny Death song lengths also leaked.

On March 12, Death Grips released a video to their YouTube channel for the song "On GP", filmed in an echo chamber located in Studio 1, Sunset Sound Recorders in Los Angeles, California which pictures them in an almost empty room (except for an Altec Lansing A7 loudspeaker) to be almost completely still except for some subtle movement from time to time. The official music video for "On GP" was released a day later, featuring various magic tricks performed by Sacramento magician Russell Brown. On March 17, the group released the song "The Powers That B" to their YouTube channel, as well as the release date and pre-order links for the album via their Facebook page. Jenny Death was leaked onto various filesharing websites and shared to 4chan and Reddit. The band later streamed the entire album on their YouTube page. The same day, the group announced on their Facebook that they 'might make some more', hinting that they intend to continue making music.

On March 24, 2015, Death Grips announced via Facebook that they were going on tour in support of the album.

== Critical reception ==
Professional ratings
Aggregate scores
Source	Rating
AnyDecentMusic?	7.4/10
Metacritic	73/100
Review scores
Source	Rating
AllMusic	3/5 stars
Consequence of Sound	C+ (Disc 1); B (Disc 2)
Cuepoint (Expert Witness)	B+
Exclaim!	9/10
MusicOMH	3.5/5 stars
NME	8/10 (Disc 2)
Pitchfork	6.7/10 (Disc 1); 8.1/10 (Disc 2)
PopMatters	7/10
Spin	7/10
Tiny Mix Tapes	(Disc 1) (Disc 2)

=== Niggas on the Moon ===
According to the review aggregator Metacritic, Niggas on the Moon received "generally favorable reviews" based on a weighted average score of 70 out of 100 from five critic scores. Michael Madden of Consequence of Sound stated: "Niggas on the Moon primarily relies on the band’s chaotic, ever-evolving sonic disposition – and as a bonus, we’ve never heard Ride sound quite like this. It’s an exciting proposition." He also described the disc as "an exciting ride" and further wrote: "By virtue of being divisive as all hell, Death Grips have welcomed us back to their jungle." Calum Slingerland of Exclaim! called the first disc "the group's most confounding collection of tracks to date," praising the manic nature of vocalist MC Ride as "a side to the vocalist largely unseen on previous releases." Larry Fitzmaurice for Pitchfork described the disc as "the band's least intense album," and stated: "it's hard to shake the feeling that Death Grips might benefit from a change in aesthetic and conceptual focus... Without new tricks and fresh aggression, Death Grips risk coming across as safe and ordinary, a mess of broken teeth summarily replaced by a gap-toothed smile." Patrick Taylor of RapReviews commented that "the songs feel more like eight variations on the same concept than eight distinct tracks."

=== Jenny Death ===
Overall, critical reception for Jenny Death was very positive, with responses generally being better than of Niggas on the Moon. On March 16, 2015, "On GP" from the album's second disc, Jenny Death, was awarded a "Best New Track" review on Pitchfork's website. Pitchfork rated the album 8.1/10, calling the album's second half the "strongest material in a while" and that "it’s not on the level of their artistic and commercial breakthrough The Money Store, but it will absolutely remind you of why you loved them in the first place." Calum Slingerland of Exclaim! described the lyrical nature of the second disc as "representative of outward action and thought more than internalization," writing that the incorporation of live instruments is a welcome addition alongside the group's aggressive electronics. Addressing the album as a complete release, Slingerland stated that The Powers That B is "a compelling look at the band's ability to work with sounds both minimal and monumental, while containing some of their most riveting lyrical and musical work in recent memory. Consequence of Sound also gave the album a positive review, saying that "some of their best debris-curdling numbers appear here" and also noted their shift in genre, claiming that "It's their most punk album, both musically and in function."

== Commercial performance ==
The album debuted at No. 72 on the Billboard 200, No. 15 on Top Rock Albums, and No. 8 on Rap Albums, selling around 9,000 in the first week. The album has sold 22,000 copies in the United States as of June 2016.

== Track listing ==
All tracks written by Death Grips.

Disc 1: Niggas on the Moon
No.	Title	Length
1.	"Up My Sleeves"	5:17
2.	"Billy Not Really"	3:49
3.	"Black Quarterback"	2:59
4.	"Say Hey Kid"	3:27
5.	"Have a Sad Cum BB"	3:40
6.	"Fuck Me Out"	3:20
7.	"Voila"	3:29
8.	"Big Dipper"	5:28
Total length:		31:28

Disc 2: Jenny Death
No.	Title	Length
1.	"I Break Mirrors with My Face in the United States"	2:41
2.	"Inanimate Sensation"	6:04
3.	"Turned Off"	4:37
4.	"Why a Bitch Gotta Lie"	4:40
5.	"Pss Pss"	4:33
6.	"The Powers That B"	5:32
7.	"Beyond Alive"	6:07
8.	"Centuries of Damn"	5:32
9.	"On GP"	6:07
10.	"Death Grips 2.0"	3:20
Total length:		49:13

Notes

- The vinyl release does not have "Death Grips 2.0".
- "Inanimate Sensation" is misspelled "Inanimate Sesnation" on the album's CD release.

== Personnel ==
Death Grips

- Stefan Burnett – vocals, lyrics
- Zach Hill – synthesizer, keyboards, drums, V-drums, production, arrangement
- Andy Morin – bass on track 9 (Jenny Death), synthesizer, engineer, production

Additional musicians

- Björk – vocal samples on tracks 1–8 (Niggas on the Moon)
- Nick Reinhart – guitar on tracks 3, 4, 7, 8 & 9 (Jenny Death)
- Julian Imsdahl – synthesizer, mellotron, organ, & guitar on tracks 3, 4, 7, 8 & 9 (Jenny Death)

== Charts ==
Chart (2015)	Peak position
UK Albums (OCC)	150
UK R&B Albums (Official Charts)	11
US Billboard 200	72
US Alternative Albums	9
US Independent Albums	4
US Rap Albums	8
US Top Rock Albums	15
