= Sonna =

American post-rock band from Baltimore, Maryland, USA

- Origin: Baltimore, Maryland, United States
- Genres: Indie rock Post-rock
- Years active: 1998–2003
- Label: Temporary Residence
- Members: Drew Nelson; Chris Mackie; Jim Redd; Jeremy deVine
- Past members: Paul Petersan
- Website: temporaryresidence.com/sonna

Sonna was an American post-rock band from Baltimore, Maryland, United States. The band formed in 1998, and released two full-length albums on label Temporary Residence, of which guitarist Jeremy deVine is the owner.

In 2016, Temporary Residence issued a compilation album consisting of the band's non-album output.

== Discography ==
=== Studio albums ===
- We Sing Loud Sing Soft Tonight (2001, Temporary Residence)
- Smile and the World Smiles with You (2002, Temporary Residence)

=== Compilations ===
- Keep It Together (2016, Temporary Residence)

=== EPs ===
- These Windows are Pistons (1999, Temporary Residence)
- Travels in Constants, Vol. 6: The Eventual Bow (2000, Temporary Residence)

=== Singles, split EPs, and collaborations ===
- Way to Breathe No Breath (split single with Paul Newman) (1999, Temporary Residence)
- Kept Luminesce / Mirameko Single (2000, Static Caravan / 2001, Temporary Residence)
- Make Shift Carousel (collaboration w/ Sybarite & Lilienthal) (2002 Zeal / 2002, Temporary Residence)

== Band members ==
- Drew Nelson – Bass
- Chris Mackie – Guitar
- Jim Redd – Drums
- Jeremy deVine – Guitar

== See also ==
- List of post-rock bands
