= World's End Girlfriend =

Japanese composer

- Also known as: World's End Boyfriend; Wonderland Falling Yesterday
- Born: 前田 勝彦; 1 November 1975 (age 50); Gotō Islands, Nagasaki Prefecture, Japan
- Genres: Electronic
- Occupation: Record producer
- Years active: 2000–present
- Labels: Noble; Human Highway; Virgin Babylon; Erased Tapes

Katsuhiko Maeda (前田 勝彦, Maeda Katsuhiko; born 1 November 1975), better known by his stage name World's End Girlfriend, is a Japanese musician from Gotō Islands, Nagasaki Prefecture. He is the founder of the record label Virgin Babylon Records.

== Biography ==
Katsuhiko Maeda was born on 1 November 1975 in Gotō Islands, Nagasaki Prefecture. At the age of 10, he started making music.

His debut studio album, Ending Story, was released in 2000. It was followed by Farewell Kingdom (2001). In 2005, he released a collaborative album with Mono, titled Palmless Prayer / Mass Murder Refrain. In February 2007, American webzine Somewhere Cold voted Palmless Prayer / Mass Murder Refrain No. 7 on their 2006 Somewhere Cold Awards Hall of Fame.

He released Hurtbreak Wonderland in 2007, Seven Idiots in 2010, and Last Waltz in 2016.

He has also written the score for films such as Air Doll and Starry Starry Night.

== Discography ==
=== Studio albums ===
- Ending Story (2000)
- Farewell Kingdom (2001)
- Dream's End Come True (2002)
- Enchanted Landscape Escape (2002) (as Wonderland Falling Yesterday)
- The Lie Lay Land (2005)
- Palmless Prayer / Mass Murder Refrain (2005) (with Mono)
- Hurtbreak Wonderland (2007)
- Seven Idiots (2010)
- Voices of Days Past (2015) (with Vampillia)
- Last Waltz (2016)
- Resistance & the Blessing (2023)

=== Soundtrack albums ===
- Air Doll (2009)
- Starry Starry Night (2011)
- Tasha Tudor: A Still Water Story (2017)
- A Girl on the Shore (2021)

=== Compilation albums ===
- Last Waltz Remix (2017)

=== Live albums ===
- Song to the Siren: Live 3.11 (2015)
- Live/10/10/2015 (2016)
- Last Waltz in Tokyo (2018)

=== EPs ===
- Sky Short Story (2000)
- Division One (2010)
- Division Two (2010)
- Other Voices (2010)
- I Know You (2012)
- Story Telling Again and Again (2012)
- Yudechang (2013) (with Bool)
- Girls/Boys Song (2014)
- Requiem EP (2017) (with Daisuke Kashiwa)
- Meguri (2018)

=== Singles ===
- "Xmas Song" (2001) (as World's End Boyfriend)
- "Halfmoon Girl" (2001) (split with Cinq)
- "Kimi o Nosete: Nausicaa Requiem" (2007) (split with Special Others)
- "Boy" (2017)
- "Eve" (2019) (with Smany)
- "Rendering the Soul" (2019)
- "Re-Rendering the Soul (Yaporigami Remix)" (2020)
- "In the Name of Love" (2021)
- "Black Box Fake Fact" (2022) (with CRZKNY)
