= Tethersonde =

Instrument used for atmospheric sounding

A tethersonde is a type of radiosonde used in atmospheric science for atmospheric sounding. Tethersondes are attached to fixed or tethered balloons via a separate tether and can be moved up and down the tether to obtain multiple atmospheric readings.
