= Bling Kong =

American indie rock band

Bling Kong was an indie rock band from New York City in early to mid 2000's. The band consisted of eleven members: three drummers, two guitarists, one bass guitar player, one videographer, and four cheerleaders. The band was known for their sexual, rock-driven, music with humorous lyrics, as well as their clothing line.

== Discography ==
- Greatest Hits 3.16.Ö3-5.20.Ö3 (2003) self-released
- Do The Awesome (2005)
