= Memorie dal Futuro =

EP by Mono
- Released: 1 November 2006
- Recorded: Japan

Mono chronology
Palmless Prayer/Mass Murder Refrain (2006)	Memorie dal Futuro (2006)	The Phoenix Tree (2007)

Memorie dal Futuro is the second EP by Japanese band Mono.

== Track listing ==
No.	Title	Length
1.	"Memorie dal Futuro (Memories from the Future)"	9:35
2.	"Due Foglie, Una Candela: Il Soffio del Vento (Two Leaves, One Candle: The Breath of the Wind)"	3:42
