= Trash Generator =

Studio album by Tera Melos
- Released: August 25, 2017
- Length: 41:50
- Label: Sargent House

Tera Melos chronology
X'ed Out (2013)	Trash Generator (2017)	Treasures and Trolls (2018)

Professional ratings
Review scores
Source	Rating
AllMusic	4/5 stars
Exclaim!	9/10
Pitchfork	7.4/10

Trash Generator is the fourth studio album by American band Tera Melos. It was released in August 2017 under Sargent House.

== Track listing ==
All tracks are written by Tera Melos

No.	Title	Length
1.	"System Preferences"	3:36
2.	"Your Friends"	3:22
3.	"Trash Generator"	3:21
4.	"Warpless Run"	2:32
5.	"Dyer Ln"	5:13
6.	"Gr30a11"	2:10
7.	"Men's Shirt"	4:11
8.	"Don't Say I Know"	3:24
9.	"A Universal Gonk"	6:11
10.	"Like a Dewclaw"	1:58
11.	"Drawing"	2:41
12.	"Super Fx"	3:11
Total length:		41:40
