= Up the Empire =

American rock band

Up The Empire is an American rock music band from Brooklyn, New York. They were formerly known as Kilowatthours and were originally formed in 1998 in Louisville, Kentucky by Ben Lord and Chris Renn. The lineup was filled out with the addition of Dan Benningfield and Ryan Compton shortly thereafter. Compton left the band in 2001, Benningfield in 2002. Dan Hewins joined the band in 2002; Doug Keith and Brad Bennett joined in 2003. Kilowatthours released several albums and singles on the Temporary Residence Ltd. label before changing their name to Up The Empire in 2004.

== Members ==
- Ben Lord – drums
- Dan Hewins – bass guitar, synthesizer and vocals
- Doug Keith – guitars, keyboard, and vocals
- Chris Renn – guitars and vocals (not on loose ends)

== Discography ==
- Seaside EP (2005) Cougar Label
- Light Rides The Super Major (2007) Cougar Label
- Loose Ends (2008) Cougar Label

== Kilowatthours discography ==
- Albums:
  - The Bright Side
  - Strain of Positive Thinking
  - Kilowatthours / The Rum Diary Split CD
- EPs:
  - Insound Tour Support No.23
  - Travels In Constants
  - All Things Regarding
- 7":
  - Lessons In Time Management
