= Mono (Japanese band) =

Japanese instrumental band

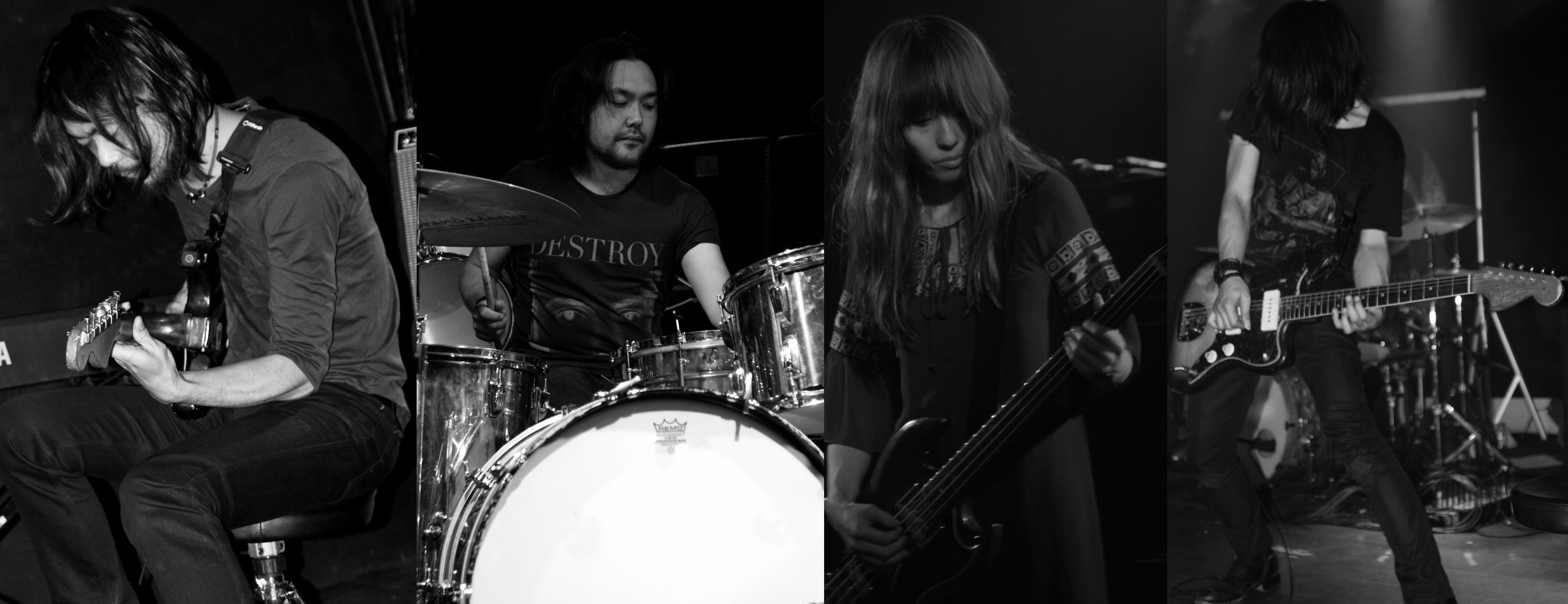
- Mono, performing in 2010. From left to right: Yoda, Takada, Tamaki, Taka.

Background information
- Origin: Tokyo, Japan
- Genres: Post-rock; contemporary classical
- Years active: 1999–present
- Labels: Temporary Residence Limited, Pelagic Records, Conspiracy, Human Highway, Tzadik
- Members: Takaakira "Taka" Goto; Hideki "Yoda" Suematsu; Dahm Majuri Cipolla; Tamaki Kunishi
- Past members: Yasunori Takada
- Website: www.monoofjapan.com

Mono (stylised as MONO) is a Japanese instrumental band, formed in 1999 in Tokyo. The band consists of Takaakira "Taka" Goto (electric guitar, glockenspiel), Hideki "Yoda" Suematsu (electric guitar, glockenspiel), Dahm Majuri Cipolla (drums), and Tamaki Kunishi (bass guitar, electric guitar, piano, glockenspiel).

Mono have released twelve studio albums. The band spent their early years, from 1999 to 2003, touring Asia, Europe, and America continuously, and released two studio albums, Under the Pipal Tree (2001) and One Step More and You Die (2002) on the Tzadik Records and Music Mine Inc. record labels, respectively. From 2004 to 2007, Mono signed to Temporary Residence Limited, released two more studio albums, Walking Cloud and Deep Red Sky, Flag Fluttered and the Sun Shined (2004) and You Are There (2006), and toured worldwide in their support. In 2008, the band took a break, returning one year later with a new studio album, Hymn to the Immortal Wind (2009), also on Temporary Residence Limited. During the tour that followed they recorded a live album, Holy Ground: NYC Live With The Wordless Music Orchestra which was released in 2010. Nowhere Now Here was released on January 25, 2019, through Pelagic Records, and was produced by the band's longtime friend Steve Albini at Electrical Audio, Chicago. It also contains Tamaki's first vocals for the band on the track "Breathe".

The band have cited a variety of experimental, avant-rock and classical music artists as inspirations but stated that their aim is to transcend genre, rejecting the post-rock label which has often been applied to them. Mono's sound is characterised by the lead and rhythm guitars of Goto and Yoda respectively, both of whom make extensive use of reverb, distortion and delay effects. The band's live performances are noted for their intensity, both in the playing and in the dynamics.

== History ==
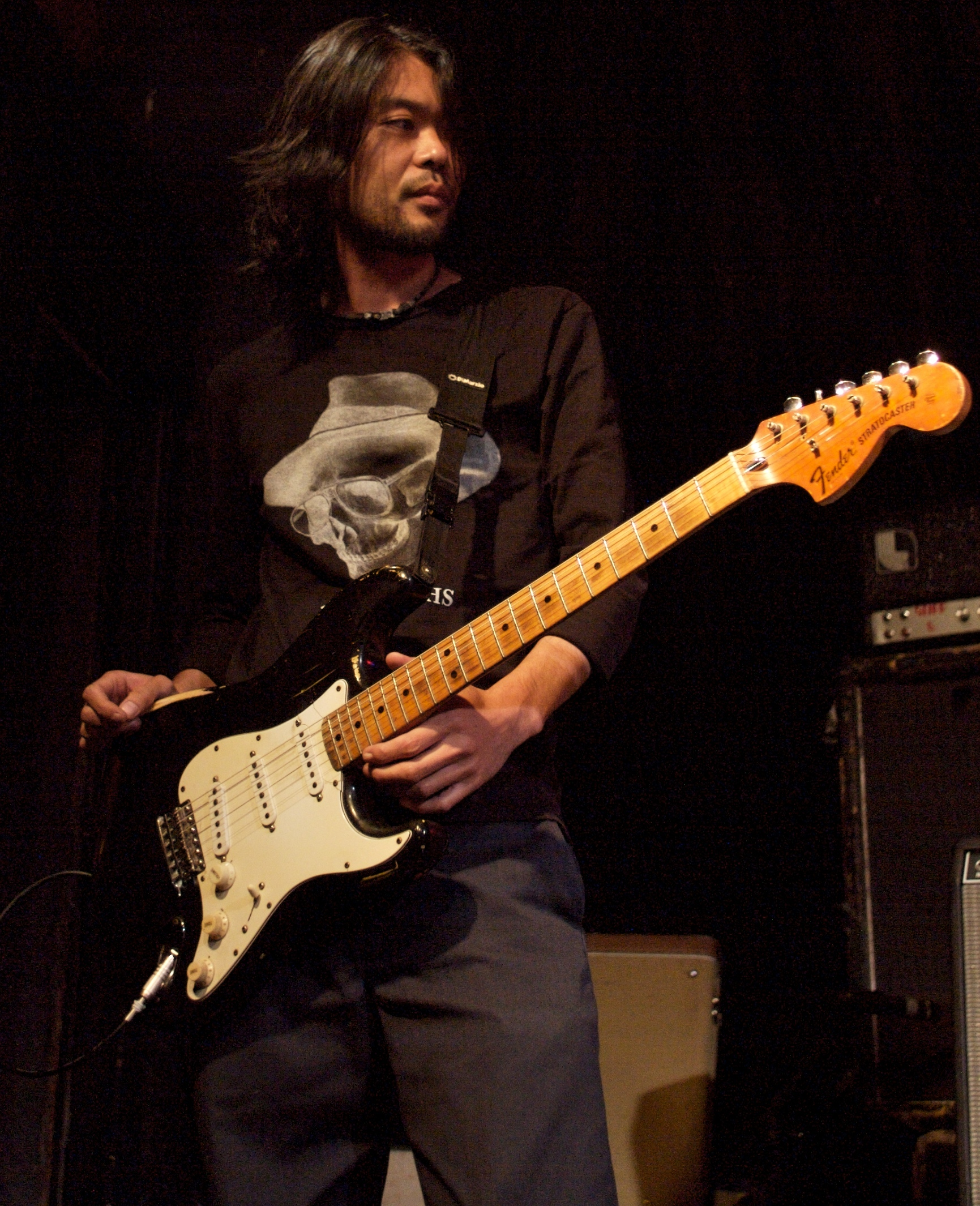
Electric guitarist "Yoda" in 2007

=== Formation and early years: 1999–2000 ===
In January 1999, Tokyo native electric guitarist Takaakira "Taka" Goto began composing music and spent the remainder of the year searching for other musicians with which to form an instrumental rock band; eventually recruiting long-time friend and fellow electric guitarist Hideki "Yoda" Suematsu on rhythm guitar. By December 1999, Tamaki Kunishi and Yasunori Takada had joined Mono on bass guitar and drums, respectively. The band played their first show in late January 2000, at Club 251 in Setagaya, Tokyo. In May 2000, the band entered Rinky Dink Studio in Tokyo and recorded their first extended play with engineers Tetsuya Morioka and Toshiro Kai, which was later self-released in September 2000: a Japan-only release titled Hey, You on their own independent record label, Forty-4. The band spent the bulk of the year composing more music and performing at various houses around Tokyo, in the neighbourhoods of Setagaya, Shimokitazawa, and Shibuya. Mono also travelled to the United States to play a one-off show in November at the Mercury Lounge in New York City; a show which was later described by Paul Wheeler of rockofjapan.com as having a "big beautiful sound that [...] naturally [expanded] through each song."

=== Under the Pipal Tree: 2001 ===
Following the release of the Hey, You extended play, Mono spent the next year playing shows throughout their native Japan, as well as playing several shows in New York City and Sweden. The band also made an appearance at the 2001 South by Southwest music festival in Austin, Texas. Between performing in Japan, Mono recorded their first studio album, Under the Pipal Tree at Studio Take-1 and Forty-4 in Tokyo. The majority of the tracks were recorded live (a trend which the band would adopt for all subsequent studio albums) in one day, the recording session of which was funded by experimental American musician John Zorn, with the band handling production duties. The album featured two previously released tracks (from the Hey, You extended play), as well as six original compositions. The album was released worldwide through New York City record label Tzadik, owned and operated by John Zorn.

=== One Step More and You Die: 2002–2003 ===
After the release of Under the Pipal Tree, the band spent the next year touring Japan and the United States, also visiting Germany and Taiwan in support of the album, as well as composing new material inspired by the tour. In June 2002, between shows in Japan, the band recorded their second studio album, One Step More and You Die at Little Bach and Sound City studios in Tokyo, with Mono again handling production duties. The album was released in Japan in October of that year on Japanese record label Music Mine Inc. The band spent most of 2003 touring in support of the album, returning to Japan, the United States, Sweden, and visiting Canada, Switzerland, Belgium, Hungary, the Netherlands, France, and the United Kingdom for the first time.

=== Walking Cloud and Deep Red Sky, Flag Fluttered and the Sun Shined: 2004 ===
Mono's next release was a collaboration with Japanese musician Aki Onda; whom the band met while touring New York in 2002. The band, Onda, and several notable members of the New York experimental music scene (including DJ Olive, Jackie-O Motherfucker, and Loren Connors) remixed One Step More and You Die. The album, titled New York Soundtracks, was released in February 2004 on Human Highway, Mono's own record label, and a successor to Forty-4.

In January 2004, the band began a long partnership with Chicagoan recording engineer Steve Albini, recording their third studio album at Electrical Audio Engineering in Chicago, Illinois. The album, titled Walking Cloud and Deep Red Sky, Flag Fluttered and the Sun Shined was released in April 2004 on Human Highway in Japan, and on Rykodisk in Europe and Temporary Residence Limited in the United States later in the year. After the album's release, the band embarked upon a year-long tour of America, Asia, and Europe.

=== You Are There: 2005–2007 ===
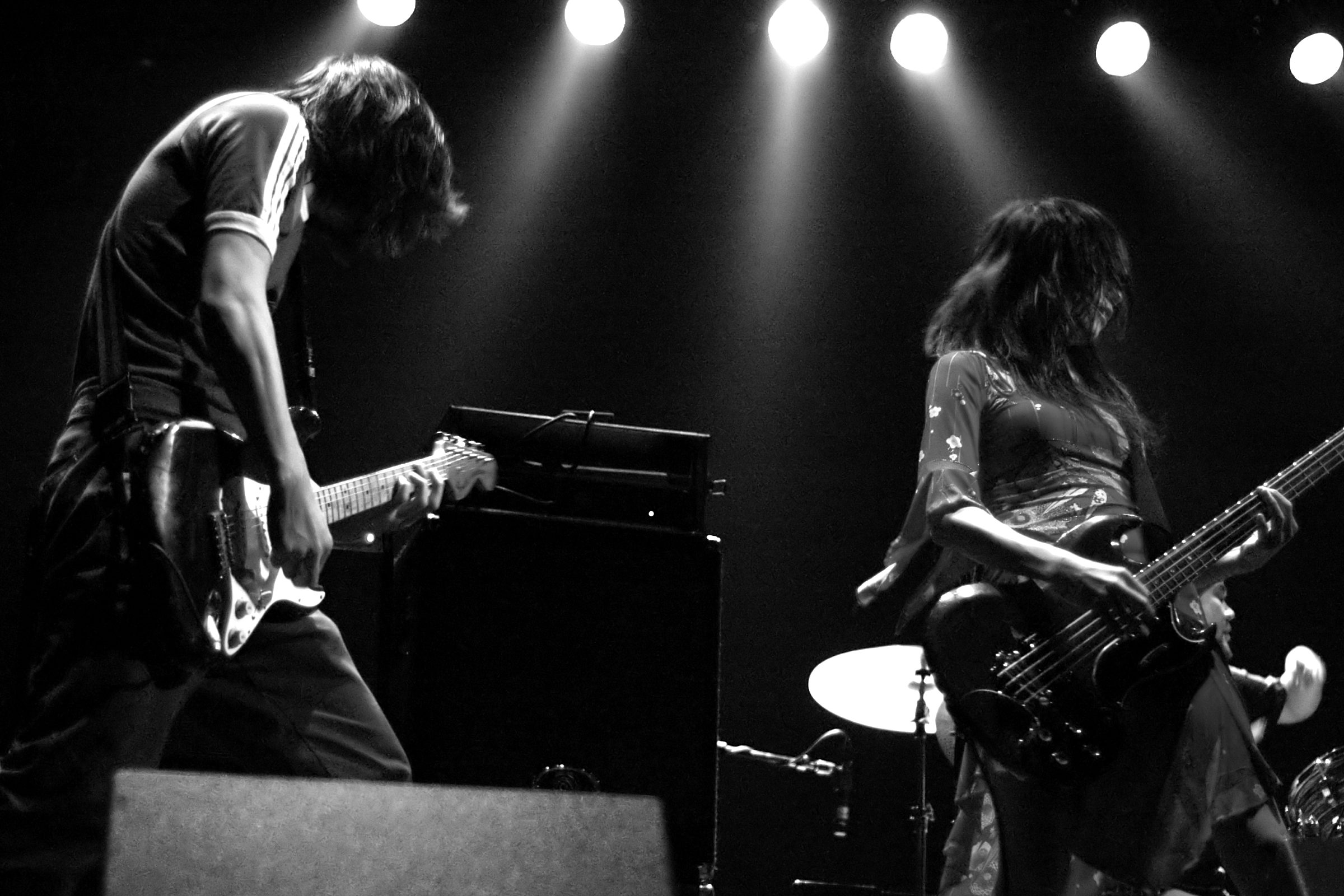
Mono in Stockholm, Sweden, May 2005

The band also spent 2005 touring Asia, America, and Europe composing music, and eventually returning to Electrical Audio Engineering in February and September to record their fourth studio album with Steve Albini. The album, titled You Are There was released in Japan in March 2006 on Human Highway, and on Temporary Residence Limited in the United States and Europe. Mono also collaborated with Japanese musician World's End Girlfriend in 2005, releasing a collaboration studio album in December of that year, on Human Highway, and with American band Pelican, releasing a split album with the band through Temporary Residence Limited in October 2005. In February 2007, American webzine Somewhere Cold voted their split with World's End Girlfriend Palmless Prayer / Mass Murder Refrain No. 7 on their 2006 Somewhere Cold Awards Hall of Fame.

Mono spent 2006 and 2007 touring Asia, America and Europe in support of You Are There. In October 2006, the band returned to Electrical Audio Engineering and recorded a four-track extended play, which was released in April 2007 as part of Temporary Residence Limited's Travels in Constants series, titled The Phoenix Tree. In November 2006, the band released a two-track extended play titled Memorie dal Futuro through Vinyl Films, and also contributed a track to a Temporary Residence Limited compilation album, Thankful. In September 2007, the band released their first compilation album, compiling material from all previous extended plays, split albums, and compilations, titled Gone: A Collection of EPs 2000–2007, as well as the music documentary DVD, The Sky Remains the Same as Ever, documenting the worldwide tours of 2006 and 2007 and the recording of The Phoenix Tree extended play.

=== Hymn to the Immortal Wind: 2008–2011 ===
Mono in Prague, Czech Republic, April 2010

In 2008, the band took a year-long break from touring, spending the time composing new music and playing a handful of shows throughout the year, including an appearance at All Tomorrow's Parties in Somerset, England, curated by Explosions in the Sky in May. Mono returned to Electrical Audio Engineering in June and November 2008 to record their fifth studio album, Hymn to the Immortal Wind, which was later released in March 2009, and followed by a year-long tour of America and Eurasia. The band played a ten-year anniversary show at the Society for Ethical Culture Hall in New York, United States on 8 May 2009, accompanied by the 24-piece Wordless Music Orchestra. The performance was recorded and later released as both a live album and a DVD, named Holy Ground: NYC Live With The Wordless Music Orchestra, through Temporary Residence Limited in Europe and America, and Human Highway in Asia. The band then took another year-long break and went into "hibernation mode", returning to Japan to work on songs for a new album.

=== For My Parents: 2012–2014 ===
Mono spent early 2012 recording a new album at Waterfront Studios in Hudson, New York, with recording engineers Henry Hirsch, accompanied by the Wordless Music Orchestra. The album was mixed by Fred Weaver at his studio, Apocalypse the Apocalypse, in Clearfield, Pennsylvania. For My Parents was MONO's first record in eight years not to be recorded by Steve Albini at Electrical Audio Studios in Chicago. For My Parents, was released on 4 September 2012, through Temporary Residence Limited. The band's press release for For My Parents states "We hope that this album serves as a gift from child to parent. While everything else continues to change, this love remains a constant throughout time."

=== The Last Dawn/Rays of Darkness: 2014–2016 ===
Mono released a double album on 24 October 2014, two contrasting records: The Last Dawn, being a more traditional Mono record; and Rays of Darkness, some of their heaviest material, even more notable for the first use of vocals on The Hand That Holds The Truth. The two were released on Temporary Residence Limited in North American and Pelagic Records elsewhere.

=== Requiem for Hell: 2016–2019 ===
Mono announced the forthcoming release of Requiem For Hell on 19 July 2016, their ninth studio album. It reintroduces strings to their sound. It was also their first full album under the newly formed label Pelagic Records. Prior to the full release of Requiem For Hell they did a split album with The Ocean (Transcendental) to commemorate this event. Later it was known that it was actually a sneak peek of the first two songs of their upcoming album. On December 9, 2017, they announced via their social media pages that Yasunori Takada (drum kit, glockenspiel, synthesizer), who has been a member since the start, will leave the band due to "personal reasons." He was replaced by Dahm Majuri Cipolla beginning with the band's live performance on August 9, 2018.

Starting in August 2018, they worked on their next project with Steve Albini at Electrical once again. On September 25, 2018, the new album was revealed to be called Nowhere Now Here, their first with Cipolla, it was released January 25, 2019.

=== Hymn to the Immortal Wind (10 Year Anniversary Edition)/Pilgrimage of the Soul/My Story, The Buraku Story/Heaven Vol. 1: 2019-present ===
To commemorate the 20th anniversary of MONO, and the 10th anniversary of Hymn to the Immortal Wind, Temporary Residence Ltd. released Hymn to the Immortal Wind - Anniversary Edition. Featuring remastered versions of the original.

In 2020, the band started touring Asia and Australia with more dates to follow in Europe and North America, but they were cancelled due to the COVID-19 pandemic. The band stopped the touring activity and began writing new music.

On Christmas Day 2020, Mono released a 2-track single called "Scarlet Holliday". Firstly released only digitally, it was then released on vinyl on March 4, 2022, with a third extra track.

Meanwhile, the band released their 11th record Pilgrimage of the Soul on September 17, 2021. The album was recorded during the height of the COVID-19 pandemic in the summer of 2020 with the usual assistance of Steve Albini. The single Riptide was released in July 2021 and anticipated the new album.

As the restrictions of the COVID-19 pandemic kept the band away from the stage, Mono composed their first soundtrack ever. My Story, The Buraku Story was released on vinyl and CD on May 27, 2022.

Finally, the band played live for the first time in over 2 years in April 2022. The first tour was held in North America throughout April, then European tour was followed from mid-August to mid-September, ending the year with a short Asia tour in the second quarter of November.

In December 2022, the band announced the beginning of a series of Christmas EPs named "Heaven" to be released every year on Christmas day. The goal of the series is to express is the light without anxiety and sadness in life. Heaven Vol. 1 featured three brand new songs and was released digitally on December 25, 2022, to which a vinyl physical released followed in March 2023.

Mono entered the studio in February 2023 to record their 12th album once again at the Electrical Audio in Chicago with Steve Albini. The recording was completed on March 4 and the album was expected for release in 2024. They also announced a new European tour for spring 2023 with more festival dates to follow in the summer.

== Musical style ==
Although Mono's musical style has developed throughout their career, it has primarily been characterised by dynamic, guitar-based instrumental soundscapes, the majority of which are composed by lead guitarist Takaakira Goto, in an attempt to channel and express the emotions of joy and sorrow. The band's style of music originally featured elements of minimalism and noise, and later developed to integrate more complex, orchestral arrangements and instrumentation. Mono's music has been categorised as both contemporary classical and post-rock, but Goto has stated:

Music is communicating the incommunicable; that means a term like post-rock doesn't mean much to us, as the music needs to transcend genre to be meaningful.

— Takaakira Goto, Time Out

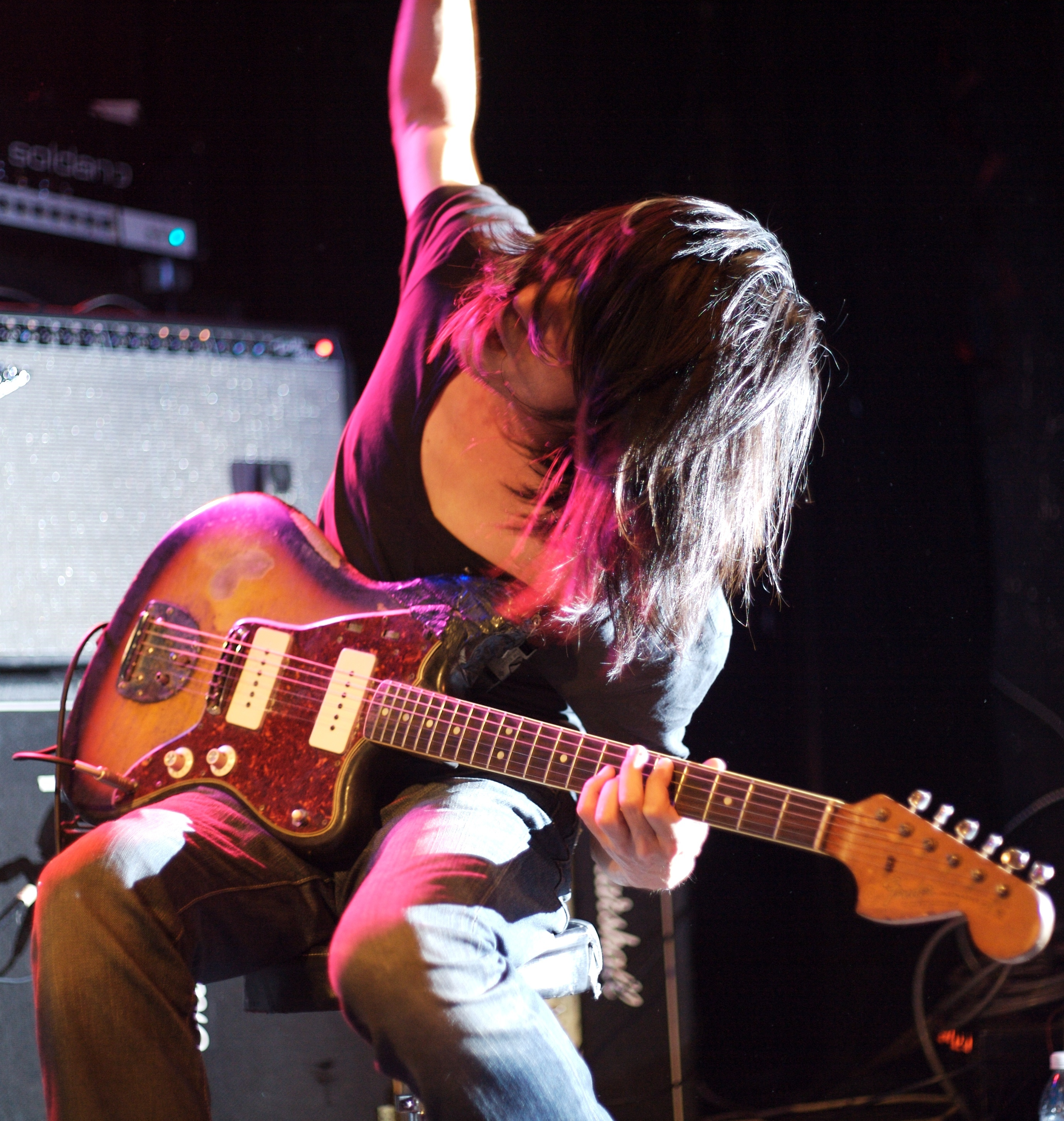
Goto performing in 2007; the band provides an emotional live performance

Mono has toured worldwide several times. Their live show tends to feature intense and emotional playing by the band members, as well as using extreme dynamics (in crescendos as well as diminuendos) in their attempt to create an "unforgettable" live performance. When recording their music, the band has always played live in the studio and, from 2004's Walking Cloud and Deep Red Sky, Flag Fluttered and the Sun Shined to 2009's Hymn to the Immortal Wind, worked with Chicagoan recording engineer Steve Albini, whom they feel accurately captured a live band's "raw emotion to [magnetic] tape."

=== Influences ===
Mono has drawn influence from various musical and non-musical sources throughout their career. When the band first formed, their main influences were American experimental rock band Sonic Youth and Anglo-Irish shoegaze band My Bloody Valentine when making Under the Pipal Tree and One Step More and You Die. As the band broadened their musical tastes, starting with the album, Walking Cloud and Deep Red Sky, Flag Fluttered and the Sun Shined, they began to be influenced by music from sources such as German classical composer Ludwig van Beethoven, Italian film score composer Ennio Morricone, and later Polish minimalist composer Henryk Górecki, among others. Lead guitarist Takaakira Goto has also acknowledged Danish film director Lars von Trier (in particular the 1996 film, Breaking the Waves) as a major influence since the band's formation, in terms of expressing the different depths and heights of emotion.

=== Instrumentation ===
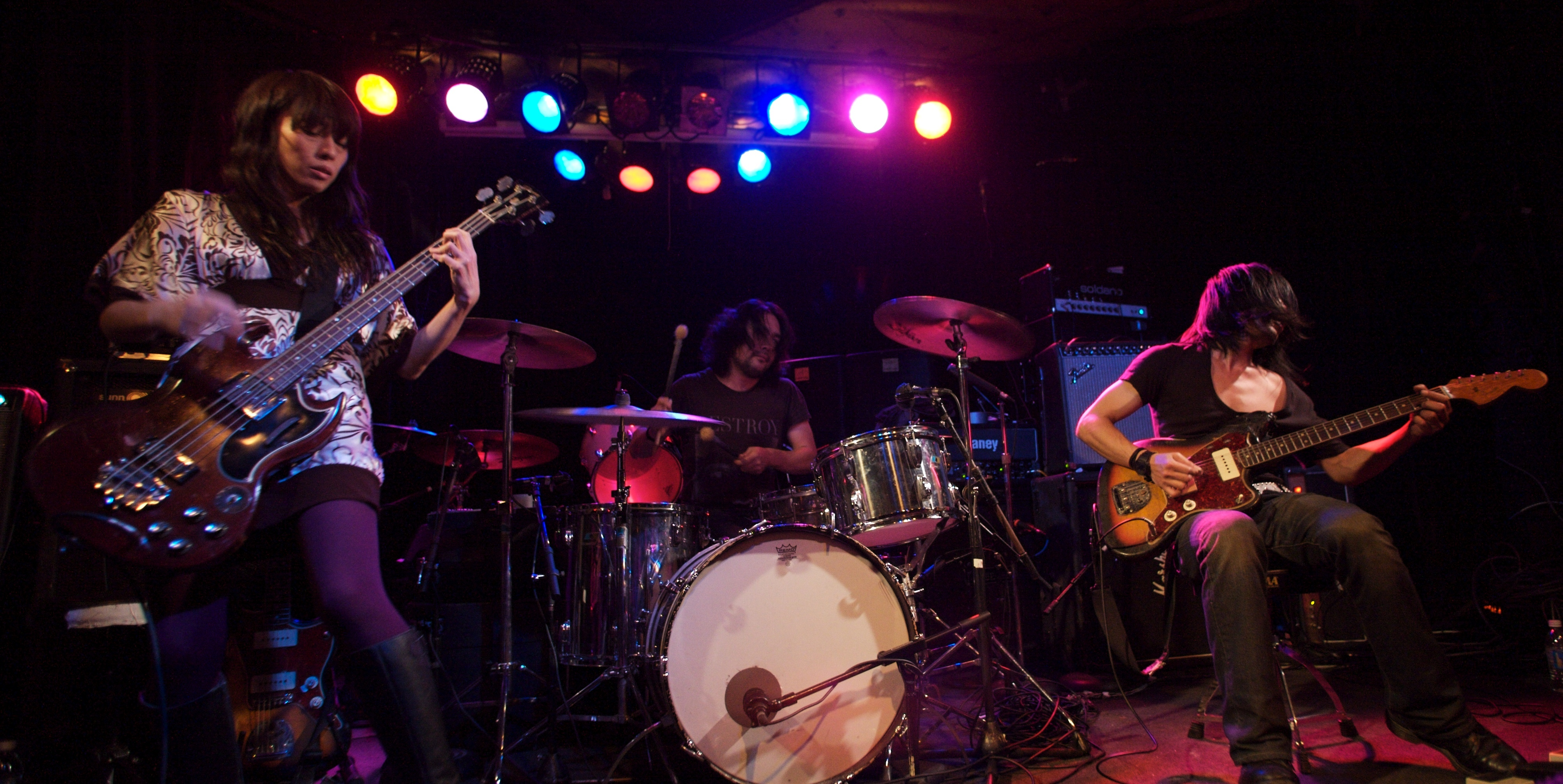
Instruments of the band (2007 at the Crocodile Cafe)

In terms of instrumentation, Mono is a four-piece instrumental rock band. Goto, the group's lead guitarist, uses a 1966 Fender Jazzmaster through Boss, Danelectro, SiB, and Morley effects pedals, into a Fender Twin, a Marshall JCM 2000 head, and a Marshall cabinet for amplification. Yoda, the rhythm guitarist, uses a 1974 Fender Stratocaster through Boss, Tech 21 and Pro Co effects pedals, into a Fender Twin for amplification. Kunishi, the group's bass guitarist, pianist and occasional guitarist uses a 1966 Gibson EB-3 through Boss, TC Electronic, and Tech 21 effects pedals, into an Ampeg B2-R head and a Sunn bass cabinet, as well as a Fender Rhodes, and a Fender Jazzmaster. Takada, the drummer, uses a four-piece 1970s Ludwig drum kit, with Zildjian, Sabian, and Paiste cymbals, as well as a Korg microKORG synthesizer.

As the band's career has progressed, they have incorporated string sections on record, beginning with Under the Pipal Tree, which featured use of cello, continuing with One Step More and You Die and Walking Cloud and Deep Red Sky, Flag Fluttered and the Sun Shined which both featured string quartets, and You Are There, which featured a string quintet. On Hymn to the Immortal Wind, the band made use of a 28-piece chamber orchestra.

== Members ==
Current members

- Takaakira "Taka" Goto – lead guitar, glockenspiel
- Hideki "Yoda" Suematsu – rhythm guitar, glockenspiel
- Tamaki Kunishi – bass guitar, guitar, piano, glockenspiel
- Dahm Majuri Cipolla – drum kit (2018–present)

Former members

- Yasunori Takada – drum kit, synthesizer, glockenspiel (1999–2017)

== Discography ==
=== Studio albums ===
- Under the Pipal Tree (2001)
- One Step More and You Die (2002)
- Walking Cloud and Deep Red Sky, Flag Fluttered and the Sun Shined (2004)
- You Are There (2006)
- Hymn to the Immortal Wind (2009)
- For My Parents (2012)
- The Last Dawn (2014)
- Rays of Darkness (2014)
- Requiem for Hell (2016)
- Nowhere Now Here (2019)
- Pilgrimage of the Soul (2021)
- OATH (2024)
- Snowdrop (2026)

=== Extended plays ===
- Hey, You (2000)
- Memorie dal Futuro (2006)
- The Phoenix Tree (2007)
- Before The Past • Live From Electrical Audio (2019)
- Scarlet Holliday (2020)
- Heaven Vol. 1 (2022)
- Heaven Vol. 2 (2023)
- Unforgettable EP (2024)
- Heaven Vol. 3 (2024)
- Heaven Vol. 4 (2025)

=== Compilation albums ===
- Gone: A Collection of EPs 2000–2007 (2007)

=== Split Albums ===
- Mono / Pelican (2005) (Mono - Pelican)

=== Collaborations ===
- Palmless Prayer / Mass Murder Refrain (2006) (with World's End Girlfriend)

=== Remix albums ===
- New York Soundtracks (2004)

=== Live albums ===
- Holy Ground: NYC Live with the Wordless Music Orchestra (2010)
- Forever Home: Live in Tokyo with Orchestra Pitreza (2025)

== Singles and music videos ==
- "Follow the Map" (2009)
- "Legend" (2012)
- "Dream Odyssey" (2013)
- "Where We Begin" (2015)
- "Requiem For Hell" (2017)
- "After You Comes the Flood" (2018)
- "Breathe" (2018)
- "Exit in Darkness" w/ A.A. Williams (2019)
- "Nowhere, Now Here (Live with the Platinum Anniversary Orchestra)" (2021)
- "Riptide" (2021)
- "Innocence" (2021)
- "Sorrow" (2023)
- "Oath" (2024)
- "Run On" (2024)
- "Hear the Wind Sing" (2024)
- "Gerbera" (2026)

== Documentary ==
- "Journey Through Hell" (2016)

=== DVDs ===
- The Sky Remains the Same as Ever (2007)
- Holy Ground: NYC Live with the Wordless Music Orchestra (2010)
