= The Drift (band) =

American post-rock band

The Drift is a post-rock band from San Francisco, California.

== Formation and projects ==
The Drift was founded in 2002 as a side project by Danny Grody, of Tarentel, and Trevor Montgomery, of Lazarus. Montgomery left the group in 2004, and Grody recruited several new members for a full band, with the group's first releases following in 2005. The group released three full-length albums, two compilations, and a contribution to the Travels in Constants series, all on the label Temporary Residence. Pitchfork Media wrote of the 2008 album Memory Drawings, "the band's somber vibe...rubs up against their jazzy backgrounds to reveal a subtle inner game of impatience tugging at all edges of their compositions."

== Members ==
- Danny Grody - keyboards, guitar
- Safa Shokrai - bass
- Rich Douthit - drums
- Jeff Jacobs - horns, electronics

== Past members ==
- Trevor Montgomery

== Discography ==
- Travels in Constants, vol. 19 (Temporary Residence, 2005)
- Noumena (Temporary Residence, 2005)
- RMXS (Temporary Residence, 2007)
- Ceiling Sky (Temporary Residence, 2007)
- Memory Drawings (Temporary Residence, 2008)
- Blue Hour (Temporary Residence, 2011)
