= One Step More and You Die =

Studio album by Mono
- Released: 2 October 2002
- Recorded: June 2002
- Studio: Little Bach Studio, Tokyo, JPN; Sound City Studio, Tokyo, JPN
- Genre: Noise rock; instrumental rock; post-rock
- Length: 51:11
- Label: Arena Rock

Mono chronology
Under the Pipal Tree (2001)	One Step More and You Die (2002)	New York Soundtracks (2004)

Professional ratings
Review scores
Source	Rating
AllMusic	4/5 stars
Pitchfork	7.0/10
Stylus	C+

One Step More and You Die is an album by Mono, released in 2002 on the Arena Rock Recording Co. label. It received generally positive reviews, and met a larger audience than their debut album had.

== Track listing ==
No.	Title	Length
1.	"Where Am I"	2:41
2.	"Com(?)"	15:53
3.	"Sabbath"	4:50
4.	"Mopish Morning, Halation Wiper"	2:54
5.	"A Speeding Car"	8:50
6.	"Loco Tracks"	6:38
7.	"Halo"	7:42
8.	"Giant Me on the Other Side"	1:37

== Personnel ==
Mono

- Takaakira "Taka" Goto – lead guitar, string arrangements
- Yoda (Hideki Suematsu) – rhythm guitar
- Tamaki Kunishi – bass
- Yasunori Takada – drums

Additional musicians

- Shouko Oki – violin
- Noriko Shibuta – violin
- Keiko Shiga – viola
- Udai Shika – cello, string arrangements

Technical

- Masataka Saito – engineer, mixer
- Yuki Koizumi – masterer
