= X'ed Out =

Studio album by Tera Melos
- Released: 2013
- Length: 46:59
- Label: Sargent House

Tera Melos chronology
Patagonian Rats (2010)	X'ed Out (2013)	Trash Generator (2017)

Professional ratings
Aggregate scores
Source	Rating
Metacritic	(81/100)
Review scores
Source	Rating
AllMusic	4/5 stars
Exclaim!	9/10
Pitchfork	7.1/10

X'ed Out is the third studio album by American band Tera Melos. It was released on April 16, 2013, by Sargent House.

== Track listing ==
All tracks are written by Tera Melos.

No.	Title	Length
1.	"Weird Circles"	3:05
2.	"New Chlorine"	4:12
3.	"Bite"	3:35
4.	"Snake Lake"	1:55
5.	"Sunburn"	3:30
6.	"Melody Nine"	3:51
7.	"No Phase"	4:08
8.	"Tropic Lame"	3:44
9.	"Slimed"	5:28
10.	"Until Lufthansa"	4:50
11.	"Surf Nazis"	4:06
12.	"X'ed Out and Tired"	4:35
Total length:		46:59
