= Majeure =

- Origin: Pittsburgh, Pennsylvania, United States
- Genres: Space rock, kraut rock
- Labels: Temporary Residence Limited, VCO Recordings, Constellation Tatsu
- Members: Anthony E. Paterra

Majeure is an American space rock and kraut rock outlet for the Pittsburgh-based musician Anthony E. Paterra. He has released four studio albums, two collaborations, an EP and a remix EP. As Majeure, Paterra has performed live internationally.

== Career ==
At the age of 12, Paterra became interested in electronic music after seeing the film Dawn of the Dead, which featured music by Goblin. During his teens, Paterra took up drumming and developed an interest in progressive rock, sci-fi and horror soundtracks. In the early 2000s drummer Paterra formed the band Zombi together with Steve Moore. They released four albums together and toured as support to Isis, Trans Am and The Psychic Paramount.

In 2007 the band ceased touring and Paterra began to explore his solo recordings while continuing to collaborate with Moore. He signed to Temporary Residence Limited and released the debut album, Timespan in 2009. Pitchfork gave the track "Teleforce" a seven out of ten rating, saying it is a "welcome and exhilarating breath of fresh air". Self Titled described the band as "disco music for paranoid androids". In July 2010 a remix EP featuring contributions by Steve Moore, Justin K Broadrick and Black Strobe appeared. In December 2011 he released the three track EP Synthesizer Of The Gods.

His second album, Solar Maximum was released in October 2012. Allmusic critic, Heather Phares noted "While the album is satisfyingly epic, Paterra's real artistry is in how he brings listeners back down to earth frequently enough so they don't get lost in space. Moore and Paterra reconvened Zombi to support Goblin on their 2013 North American tour. In June 2014, Paterra released the album Termination Shock on VCO Recordings and Music Fear Satan. In October 2015 the Union of Worlds album appeared on Constellation Tatsu. Paterra featured on the second Brain Machine album Peaks, released in May 2016. In June 2016 Majeure toured as support to Black Mountain.

He also forms the duo Contact with the English film-maker and musician Paul Lawler. After VCO Recordings (part-owned by Paterra) has released the Lawler album Opus, the two decided to collaborate under the name Contact. In October 2014 they released the four track EP First Contact on Temporary Residence. In June 2016 they released the album Zero Moment, it was preceded by the streaming of the song "Sensorium" on SoundCloud.

== Style ==
Paterra performs both as a drummer and electronic musician. He uses looping synthesizer beats to create the music for his Majeure outlet, while in Zombi and Contact he plays drums. He uses DSI Mono evolver and a Moog Source.

== Discography ==
Albums

- Timespan (Temporary Residence, 2010)
- Brainstorm (split LP with Steve Moore, Temporary Residence, 2012)
- Solar Maximum (Temporary Residence, 2012)
- Termination Shock (VCO, 2014)
- Union of Worlds ( Constellation Tatsu, 2015)
- Timespan Redux (2018)

=== EPs ===
- Timespan remixes (2010)
- Synthesizer Of The Gods (2011)
- Apex (2017)

=== As Contact ===
==== Album ====
- Zero Moment (2016)

=== EP ===
- First Contact (2014)
