= Tera Melos =

American math rock band

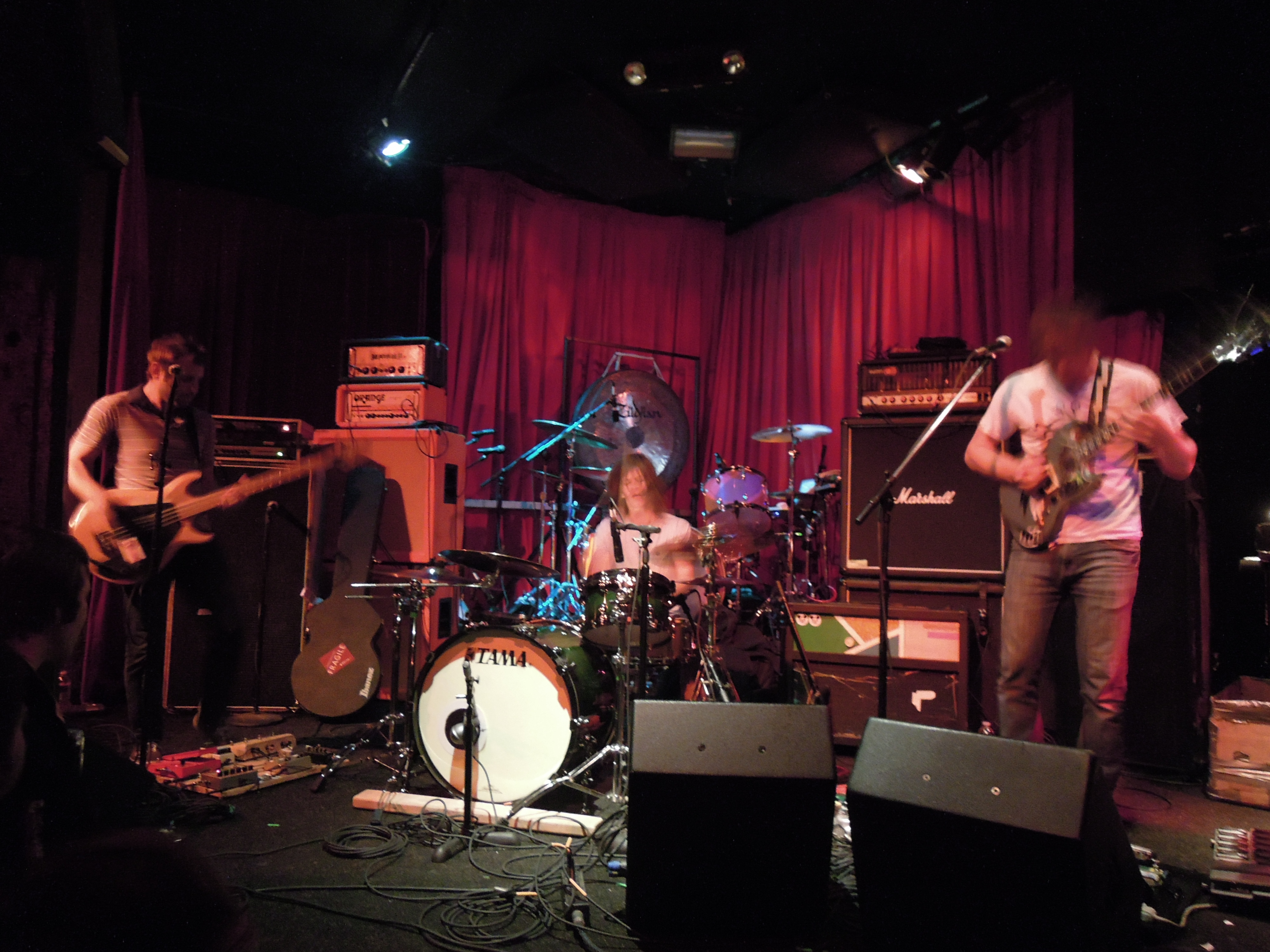
- Tera Melos in 2011

Background information
- Origin: Sacramento, California, U.S.
- Genres: Math rock; indie rock; experimental rock; punk jazz; progressive rock; post-hardcore
- Years active: 2004–2018 (hiatus)
- Labels: Springman; Sargent House
- Members: Nick Reinhart; Nathan Latona; John Clardy
- Past members: Jeff Worms; Vince Rogers
- Website: teramelos.bandcamp.com

Tera Melos is an American math rock band from Sacramento, California, formed in 2004. They incorporate many styles of rock, ambient electronics and unconventional song structures. They are currently a three-piece, consisting of founding members guitarist-keyboardist-vocalist Nick Reinhart and bassist Nathan Latona, and drummer John Clardy, who joined the group in 2008. Tera Melos play a brand of music characterized by quickly alternating rhythmic patterns, start-stop dynamics, improvisation, two-handed tapping on the guitar, extended open-ended bridges, and the use of effects pedals and samplers.

== History ==
=== Early years (2004–2007) ===
The band formed in 2004 after the breakup of Nick Reinhart and Nathan Latona's former band No Regard. Jeff Worms and Vince Rogers joined shortly thereafter. Tera Melos rehearsed for nearly a full year before choosing to debut live. The band had initially intended to recruit a vocalist but did not settle on one and chose to carry on as an instrumental band for the next several years. After releasing a four-song demo, their untitled debut full-length was released on October 4, 2005. The album is composed of eight instrumental tracks. In 2010, it was re-issued on Sargent House. While some of the tracks on the album feature distorted vocals that are somewhat undecipherable, guitarist Nick Reinhart started contributing more prominent vocals to the music with the release of their 2007 split with By the End of Tonight, called Complex Full of Phantoms. The album was named one of the most overlooked albums of 2005 by AP magazine.

Right before they started recording their second EP, Drugs to the Dear Youth, guitarist Jeff Worms left the band. On January 19, 2007, Tera Melos released the EP on Sargent House. Called Drugs for short, the EP took a step away from the band's previous sound into more progressive and original territory. They then embarked on their first national tour.

Later in the year, the band contributed five songs to a split EP with the Houston, Texas band By The End Of Tonight. Released on Temporary Residence Limited, Complex Full of Phantoms was the first release to feature prominent vocals in Tera Melos songs. Tours with By The End Of Tonight and Facing New York followed.

=== Patagonian Rats (2008–2012) ===
Tera Melos announced on their Myspace page on April 2, 2008, that drummer Vince would be leaving the band to pursue other things after their Spring tour. He now performs a solo drum act using a sequencer under the name the Blank Reference. He is also a member of Marnie Stern's band. Tera Melos began searching for a new drummer, and after six months announced the addition of John Clardy. Prior to Vince's departure, the band had been planning a long-awaited LP release after touring; however, plans for a full-length were delayed. In the meantime they ended up releasing an EP of covers, featuring songs by the Beach Boys and Polaris, entitled Idioms, Vol. I.

Tera Melos at The Smell in Los Angeles, California, in 2010

The band resumed live activity again in January 2009 and toured with the likes of RX Bandits, These Arms are Snakes, and Melt Banana, in addition to headlining tours of their own.

Tera Melos have developed a cult-like fan base around the United States, ultimately gaining some popularity in Europe, Asia, and South America. In September 2009, the Drugs to the Dear Youth EP and Tera Melos songs from the Complex Full of Phantoms split were combined into the release Drugs/Complex on Parabolica Records in Japan. October 2009 saw the band perform an 8-date headlining tour of Japan, and were subsequently featured in the DVD Parabolica Jam '09.

On November 7, 2009, Tera Melos confirmed a new album due out in 2010 in a Myspace bulletin. The post stated that the band was set to begin recording the next day. The new album, titled Patagonian Rats, was released on September 7, 2010. The band toured extensively throughout North America and Europe in support of the record, playing with bands such as Maps & Atlases and Marnie Stern.

The band embarked on a brief West Coast tour with the recently reunited Firehose in April 2012.

=== X'ed Out (2013–2016) ===
On January 17, 2013, along with the release of a new song "Tropic Lame", Tera Melos announced their new LP X'ed Out, which was released by Sargent House on April 16. Tracks from the album "Sunburn" and "Bite" were later released as singles. The band once again toured extensively in Europe, as well as a tour with Sargent House label-mates TTNG in the United States.

The band supported Minus the Bear on their West Coast dates. They have also since done extensive touring in 2014 traveling with The Dillinger Escape Plan, and then again with Pinback.

During many of their 2014 shows they performed "Dyer Ln" and "Don't Say I Know", both of which would not see a release until 2017's Trash Generator.

Nick Reinhart was featured on Death Grips' instrumental album Fashion Week, as well as disc 2 of their double album The Powers That B and their fifth album Bottomless Pit.

=== Trash Generator and hiatus (2017–present) ===
In the final months of 2016, Tera Melos returned to the studio to record their first full-length album since X'ed Out. Drummer John Clardy left the School of Rock of Southlake, Texas as the band finished sessions for a brand new album entitled Trash Generator. Before the album released, they toured with Chon and Covet, where they would perform "Treasures and Trolls", which appeared later as a single. The album was released on August 25, 2017, and typically received positive reviews. The band went on a U.S. tour that October with Speedy Ortiz.

"Treasures and Trolls", despite already having a presence in their setlist, did not release until late 2018—a full year after the album. The single also released with a B-side featuring Rob Crow and a digital bonus track, both of which were from the album's sessions. During 2018, Tera Melos went on a headlining tour with Mouse on the Keys and supporting Minus the Bear on their farewell tour. For personal reasons, Nathan had to cancel his appearances on the tour and was filled in for by long-time friend and contributor Pat Hills.

During a 2021 live-stream, Nick Reinhart stated that the band members have been in contact with one another, but haven't seen each other for some time due to Nathan and John living in Europe. This has left the band on an indefinite hiatus. In 2021, Nick Reinhart formed the band Undo K From Hot with Death Grips drummer Zach Hill and The Advantage guitarist Robby Mancrief, releasing their debut studio album G.A.S. Get a Star on May 7, 2021.

Recently, Nick Reinhart has gone on tour with Death Grips in place of Andy Morin. It's presumed Andy left the group, although this is unknown.

== Musical style ==
Tera Melos's sound is labeled as math rock, experimental rock and punk jazz, with influences from progressive rock and post-hardcore. AllMusic critic Jason Lymangrover wrote that the band melds "the aggression of punk with the technical intricacies of prog rock," using "jerky shifts in time signatures and disjointed guitar noodling with a close resemblance to Don Caballero and Hella." The band's music also features tapped guitar parts, as well as angular bass riffs and splintered spazz-jazz drumming, complemented with ambient electronics and sparse vocal lines.

Starting with Patagonian Rats in 2010, the band began to infuse pop elements and harmonic singing to their sound, "making a shift from unconventional song structures of ambient-indebted post rock to hyper-technical guitar pop." Their third album X'ed Out (2013) incorporated influences from skate punk, dream pop, and proto-emo.

== Members ==
=== Current ===
- Nick Reinhart – guitars, vocals, programming (2004–present)
- Nathan Latona – bass (2004–present)
- John Clardy – drums (2008–present)

=== Former ===
- Jeff Worms – guitars (2004–2006)
- Vince Rogers – drums (2004–2008)

Timeline

== Discography ==
=== Studio albums ===
- Untitled (2005) Springman, reissued (2010) Sargent House
- Patagonian Rats (2010) Sargent House
- X'ed Out (2013) Sargent House
- Trash Generator (2017) Sargent House

=== Compilation albums ===
- Drugs/Complex (2010) Sargent House

=== EPs ===
- Demo (2004)
- Alive (2005)
- Drugs to the Dear Youth (2007) Sargent House
- IDIOMS vol. I (2009) Sargent House
- Frozen Zoo Remixes (2010) Sargent House
- Zoo Weather (2011) Sargent House
- Echo on the Hills of Knebworth (2011) Sargent House
- X'ed Out-The Remixes (2013) Sargent House
- Treasures and Trolls (2018) Sargent House

=== Splits ===
- Complex Full of Phantoms (split with By the End of Tonight) (2007) Temporary Residence Limited

=== Music videos ===
- "Hey Sandy" (2009)
- "The Skin Surf" (2010)
- "Frozen Zoo" (2010)
- "Manar the Magic" (2011)
- "Kelley" (2011)
- "So Occult" / "Kelly" (2011)
- "Bite" (2013)
- "Weird Circles" (2013)
- "Slimed" (2014)
- "Sunburn" (2014)
- "Trash Generator" (2017)
- "Warpless Run" (2017)
