= You Are There (Mono album) =

Studio album by Mono
- Released: 15 March 2006
- Studios: Electrical Audio; Chicago, Illinois, U.S.
- Length: 60:00
- Label: Temporary Residence Limited
- Producer: Steve Albini

Mono chronology
Pelican / Mono (2005)	You Are There (2006)	Palmless Prayer/Mass Murder Refrain (2006)

Professional ratings
Aggregate scores
Source	Rating
Metacritic	81/100
Review scores
Source	Rating
AllMusic	4/5 stars
Alternative Press	5/5 stars
Cokemachineglow	76%
Drowned in Sound	9/10
Pitchfork	5.8/10
PopMatters	9/10
Tiny Mix Tapes	2.5/5 stars
Under the Radar	6/10
URB	3.5/5 stars

You Are There is the fourth studio album by Japanese instrumental rock band Mono. A double album, it was released on 15 March 2006. The album was recorded in 2005 at Electrical Audio in Chicago, Illinois with recording engineer Steve Albini. The CD version comes with a removable paper slipcase around the jewelcase which can be flipped around to provide two different versions of cover art.

== Track listing ==
All music is composed by Mono.

No.	Title	Length
1.	"The Flames Beyond the Cold Mountain"	13:29
2.	"A Heart Has Asked for the Pleasure"	3:43
3.	"Yearning"	15:38
4.	"Are You There?"	10:25
5.	"The Remains of the Day"	3:41
6.	"Moonlight"	13:04
Total length:		60:00

== Personnel ==
- Takaakira Goto – lead guitar
- Yoda – rhythm guitar
- Tamaki Kunishi – bass guitar
- Yasunori Takada – drum kit
