= Temporary Residence Limited =

Brooklyn-based record label

- Founded: 1996
- Founder: Jeremy deVine
- Genre: Experimental rock, electronic, punk rock, post-rock
- Country of origin: United States
- Location: Brooklyn, New York
- Official website: temporaryresidence.com

Temporary Residence Limited (shortened TRL) is a Brooklyn, New York–based record label. TRL was started in Louisville, Kentucky, in 1996 by Jeremy DeVine, and initially concentrated on releasing music by Louisville-based bands. DeVine moved to Baltimore, Maryland, in the late 1990s to attend the Maryland Institute College of Art, but dropped out to concentrate on running the label by the end of the decade. DeVine later moved operations to Brooklyn, New York.

The label releases the Travels in Constants series of limited-edition albums.

In December 2005, American webzine Somewhere Cold voted Temporary Residence Limited Label of the Year on their 2005 Somewhere Cold Awards Hall of Fame list.

== Current artists ==
- William Basinski
- Bellini
- Canon Blue
- Caroline
- Rob Crow
- Damsel
- Eluvium
- Envy
- Explosions in the Sky
- Field Works
- Grails
- Hauschka
- Howard Hello
- Inventions
- Majeure
- Maserati
- Mogwai
- Mono
- My Disco
- Parlour
- Party Dozen
- Pinback
- Prefuse 73
- Prints
- Sleeping People
- Sparkle Division
- Sybarite
- Tangents
- Kenseth Thibideau
- Three Mile Pilot
- United Nations
- Watter
- Young Widows
- Zammuto

== Past artists ==
- The Anomoanon
- The Black Heart Procession
- The Books
- By the End of Tonight
- Cerberus Shoal
- Cex
- Coliseum
- Dreamers of the Ghetto
- The Drift
- Evergreen
- Fridge
- Halifax Pier
- Icarus
- Kammerflimmer Kollektief
- Kilowatthours
- The Ladies
- Lazarus
- The Loved
- Lumen
- Miss Violetta Beauregarde
- Nero
- Nice Nice
- Nightfist
- Rumah Sakit
- Sonna
- Systems Officer
- Tarentel
- The 90 Day Men
- Turing Machine
- Wino

== Split releases ==
- Tera Melos/By the End of Tonight
- Thursday/Envy
- Maserati/Zombi
- Jesu/Eluvium
- Steve Moore/Majeure
