= Elf Titled =

Studio album by The Advantage
- Released: January 24, 2006
- Recorded: Jackpot! - Portland, OR
- Genres: Nintendocore, video game music, instrumental rock
- Length: 36:16
- Label: 5 Rue Christine; GER050
- Producers: Antreo Pukay, JR, John Golden, The Advantage

The Advantage chronology
Da Advantage EP (2004)	Elf Titled (2006)	Underwear: So Big! EP (2006)

Elf Titled is an album, the third release by Nintendocore band The Advantage. It is their second full-length studio album, and as with all their albums, all tracks are covers of music from video games.

== Track listing ==
1. Batman - Stage 1 – 2:27
2. Contra - Alien's Lair / Boss Music – 2:56
3. Double Dragon 3 - Egypt – 1:57
4. DuckTales - Moon – 1:39
5. Metroid - Kraid's Lair – 2:41
6. Air Fortress - Not Fat Iced Caramel Hazelnut Soy Latte with Extra Whipped Cream – 2:28
7. Bomberman 2 - Wiggy – 1:47
8. Castlevania - Intro + Stage 1 – 1:28
9. Solar Jetman - Braveheart Level – 2:48
10. The Goonies 2 - Wiseman – 0:41
11. Double Dragon 2 - Mission 5: Forest of Death – 2:24
12. Castlevania III: Dracula's Curse - Boss Music / Willow - Village / Mega Man 2 - Bubble Man – 3:55
13. Mega Man 2 - Stage Select / Metal Man – 2:04
14. Castlevania II - Woods – 1:22
15. Guardian Legend - Corridor 1 – 1:52
16. Wizards and Warriors - Tree Trunk / Woods / Victory – 3:47

== Members ==
The Advantage

- Robby Moncrieff - guitar, electric sitar, percussion, piano, organ, vocals, yelp, knobs
- Ben Milner - guitar, electric sitar, Hammond organ, synth, percussion, vocals, knobs
- Spencer Seim - drums, vocal sensibility
- Carson McWhirter - bass, autoharp, percussion, vocals, SK-1, Hammond organ, knobs

Additional personnel

- Antreo Pukay - additional vocals
- Jeremiah - additional percussion
