= Advantage =

Advantage may refer to:

- Advantage (debate), an argument structure in competitive debate
- Mechanical advantage, in engineering, the ratio of output force to input force on a system
- Advantage of terrain, in military use, a superiority in elevation over an opposing force
- Advantage (cryptography), a measure of the effectiveness of an enemy's code-breaking effort

== Sport ==
- Advantage, in tennis terminology, when one player needs one more point to win the game
- Advantage in football and rugby; decision made by officials in a game not to stop play after a rule infringement, because the opposing side has a better position if play continues normally. See, for example, entries in glossaries of association football, rugby union, and rugby league terms

== Arts and entertainment ==
- Advantage (film), a 1977 Bulgarian film
- The Advantage : Why Organizational Health Trumps Everything Else in Business, book by Patrick Lencioni

=== Music ===
- Advantage (album), a 1983 post-punk album by the English band Clock DVA
- Advantage (band), an English brass rock band (fl. 2000s)
- The Advantage (band)
- The Advantage (album)

== Ships ==
- HMS Advantage, one of three ships of the British Navy

== Brands ==
- Advantage Database Server, a database product from Sybase iAnywhere
- Imidacloprid (Advantage or Advantage Flea Killer), a flea poison for pets
- Gillig Advantage, a low-floor transit bus
- Advantage, later known as Alpen Wheat Flakes, a breakfast cereal
- Advantage Rent a Car, a car rental company
- GP Advantage, a brand of printer paper owned by Georgia-Pacific
- NES Advantage, a joystick for the Nintendo Entertainment System
- Super Advantage, a joystick for the Super Nintendo Entertainment System
