= Rumah Sakit =

American instrumental rock band

Rumah Sakit was an instrumental rock band from San Francisco, California, United States. The group was signed to Temporary Residence Limited. "Rumah sakit" means "hospital" in Indonesian (lit. 'sick house').

Rumah Sakit was founded in either late 1997 or early 1998 by Kenseth Thibideau (who played in Redlands and Tarentel) and other members of the group Redlands. The group's debut album was self-titled and was issued in 2000; Allmusic described the album as "a heady mix of mathy time signatures and dense musical passages that craftily, oftentimes dreamily, intersect." Rumah Sakit released a contribution to Temporary Residence's Travels in Constants series in 2001, after which time they took a brief hiatus. In 2002, the group released Obscured by Clowns, whose name was inspired by the Pink Floyd album Obscured by Clouds. Pitchfork Media noted that the album drew from "both jazz-based post-rock and math-rock", and Allmusic likened it to Tortoise, Mogwai, Dinosaur Jr., Explosions in the Sky, and Black Dice. After the release of Obscured by Clowns, the group went on another hiatus. A live performance with Sweep the Leg Johnny recorded in December 2000 was also released in 2002. They regrouped for live shows in 2005.

== Members ==
- John Baez (guitar)
- Jeff Shannon (drums)
- Mitch Cheney (guitar)
- Kenseth Thibideau (bass)

== Discography ==
Albums

- Rumah Sakit (Temporary Residence, 2000)
- Travels in Constants (Temporary Residence, 2001)
- Obscured by Clowns (Temporary Residence, 2002)
- Live September 9th, 2000 (Sickroom, 2002) - live split with Sweep the Leg Johnny
- Live at the Bottom of the Hill (Errol Records, 2002)

Appearances

- Looking for the Perfect Glass; U.S. Pop Life Vol. 11 CD; California Post Punk
  - Track: "Night Ascends and Descends the Confines of the City" (segment of a joint improvisation featuring members of Rumah Sakit and Dilute from 2000)
- Howard Hello & Greenness, split 2 CD (released July 3, 2007) (Sickroom Records) (segment of a joint improvisation featuring members of Rumah Sakit and Dilute from 2000)
  - Track: "MDLFS#4"
