= The Advantage =

American rock band

- Origin: Sacramento, California
- Genres: Nintendocore; instrumental rock; video game music
- Years active: 1998–2016
- Labels: 5 Rue Christine
- Members: Robby Moncrieff; Ben Milner; Carson McWhirter; Spencer Seim
- Past members: Nick Rogers; Forrest Harding; Cassie Stewart

The Advantage is an American rock band from Sacramento, California that formed in 1998 and specialises in doing covers of music from old NES games, also known as Nintendocore. The band is named after the NES controller of the same name.

== History ==
Founding drummer Spencer Seim first began playing video game music after going to a talent show in Nevada City, California, where he met a duo who played songs from game soundtracks. He then joined that group, but its two other members moved to Milwaukee soon after, so he founded The Advantage with three high school bandmates (Nick Rogers, Carson McWhirter, and Ben Milner) to continue playing video game music. The group attracted the attention of Kill Rock Stars subsidiary label 5 Rue Christine, who signed them and released their self-titled debut album in 2004. The album featured 26 covers of songs from Nintendo games. Initially, McWhirter arranged the compositions for the ensemble, but over time, they began working out their own parts independently by listening to the game soundtracks.

During the tour of their debut album the band released, Da Advantage EP, in 2004 through their own label T.A.R. (The Advantage Records) and sold it at shows. Rather than relying on keyboards or sampling to evoke the band's source material, their recordings covered tunes from the games through standard rock instrumentation - guitar, bass, and drums. Pitchfork Media praised the album, noting, "the simplicity and melodic strength of the source material focuses the players, and the players flesh out the source material beyond its original technological limitations."

In 2006, Rogers left the group and guitarist Robby Moncrieff joined for their second full-length record, Elf Titled, also released on 5RC Records. Allmusic noted that Elf Titled featured several covers of songs from less-well-known Nintendo games. This album featured vocals on one track, as well as introducing some synthesized instrumentation. The band released their second EP, Underwear: So Big! EP, through their own Advantage Records label during their 2006 tour and sold it at shows. After the release of Elf Titled, the band toured for a short while before entering a hiatus. By this time Seim and McWhirter had released several albums as part of the group Hella.

In 2010 a compilation album, B-Sides Anthology, was released by Obstructive Vibrations in digital download format. It contains all of the material from Da Advantage EP and all of the material from the Underwear: So Big! EP (except for track 3, Gradius II - Boss) plus a few extra rare tracks. The band also played a brief tour in 2010 mostly in Japan.

In recent years the band has been releasing material on their own label, The Advantage Records (T.A.R.) through their Bandcamp page. They released a compilation album of edited tracks in 2013 from the Self Titled, Elf Titled, and B-Sides albums titled Edits. In 2014 the band released the live album Live from: The Great American Music Hall. It contains tracks from the February 27, 2004 live performance at The Great American Music Hall in San Francisco where they opened with Ester Drang for John Vanderslice and Pedro the Lion at the 2004 Noise Pop Music Festival. The band also released a live album in 2013 called Rock Bottom: Live from Bottom of the Hill which consists of songs from the June 24, 2006 live performance at Bottom of the Hill in San Francisco, CA. It was re-released on June 24, 2016 for the 10 year anniversary of the show with better audio and minor corrections. On June 25, 2016, Bottom Line: Live from Bottom of the Hill was released.

The Advantage have covered songs from these NES games: Air Fortress, Batman: The Video Game, Batman: Return of the Joker, Bubble Bobble, Bionic Commando, Blaster Master, Bomberman II, Castlevania, Castlevania II: Simon's Quest, Castlevania III: Dracula's Curse, Contra, Double Dragon II, Double Dragon III, DuckTales, Fester's Quest, Final Fantasy, Final Fantasy III, Ghosts 'N Goblins, Goonies II, Gradius II, Gremlins 2: The New Batch, The Guardian Legend, Karnov, The Legend of Zelda, Marble Madness, Mega Man II, Mega Man III, Metal Gear, Metroid, Ninja Gaiden, Ninja Gaiden II, Solar Jetman, Super Mario Bros. 2, Super Mario Bros. 3, TMNT, Teenage Mutant Ninja Turtles: Out of the Shadows, Willow, and Wizards & Warriors.

== Members ==
- Robby Moncrieff (guitar)
- Ben Milner (guitar)
- Carson McWhirter (bass)
- Spencer Seim (drums)
- Nick Rogers (guitar & bass)
- Forrest Harding (guitar)
- Cassie Stewart (bass)

== Discography ==
Albums

- The Advantage (April 6, 2004) 5 Rue Christine Records
- Da Advantage EP - 2004 Tour CD (October, 2004) The Advantage Records
- Elf Titled (January 24, 2006) 5 Rue Christine Records
- Underwear: So Big! EP - 2006 Tour CD (August 2006) The Advantage Records
- B-Sides Anthology (September 7, 2010) Obstructive Vibrations
- Edits (Oct 31, 2013) The Advantage Records (T.A.R.)

Live releases

- Live from: The Great American Music Hall (February 27, 2014) The Advantage Records
- Rock Bottom: Live from Bottom of the Hill (June 24, 2016) The Advantage Records
- Bottom Line: Live from Bottom of the Hill (June 25, 2016) The Advantage Records
