= Dan Elkan =

American singer-songwriter and producer

- Born: September 7, 1978 (age 47); Nevada City, California, United States
- Genres: Rock
- Instruments: Vocals, guitar
- Website: www.themhills.com

Dan Elkan (born September 7, 1978) is an American singer-songwriter and producer, who is best known as the singer and guitarist for the rock band Them Hills. Elkan has performed live with Broken Bells, Hella, and Kim Deal, and has appeared on recordings by Hella, Team Sleep, Norah Jones and Zach Hill. Elkan produced Aaron Ross' 2007 album "Shapeshifter" and tracks for Golden Shoulders' "Get Reasonable" 2009. Elkan also co-produced Zach Hill & Holy Smokes' "Masculine Drugs" 2004 and Holy Smokes' "Talk to Your Kids about Gangs" 2006 as well as Alela Diane's 2009 album "To Be Still".

The Union (Western Nevada County, CA) in 2009 called him "instrumental in much of the music that has come out of Nevada County in the last 10 years".

== Discography ==
With Pocket For Corduroy

- S/T EP (1998)
- As Soon As Impossible (2001)

With Hella

- Bitches Ain't Shit But Good People (2003)
- There's No 666 In Outer Space (2007)

With Golden Shoulders

- Friendship Is Deep (2004)
- Get Reasonable (2009)

Holy Smokes

- Masculine Drugs (2004)

With Zach Hill and

With Team Sleep

- Team Sleep (2005)

With Daisy Spot

- Daisy Spot (album) (2005)

With Holy Smokes

- Talk To Your Kids About Gangs (2006)

With Aaron Ross

- Shapeshifter (2007)

With Them Hills

- Greener Grassing (2007)
- Process (2009)

With Zach Hill

- Astrological Straits (2009)

With Alela Diane

- To Be Still (2009)

With Norah Jones

- Little Broken Hearts (2012)

With Zavalaz

- All Those Nights We Never Met (unreleased)

With Pluralone

- To Be One With You (2019)

== Tours ==
- Pocket For Corduroy (Vocals & Guitar, 2001)
- Hella (vocals, guitar, keyboard & sampler, 2005)
- Them Hills (vocals & guitar, 2006-2011)
- Broken Bells (vocals & guitar, 2010)
- Zavalaz (guitar & vocals, 2013)
