= The Advantage (album) =

Studio album by The Advantage
- Released: April 6, 2004
- Genre: Nintendocore; instrumental rock; video game music
- Length: 41:34
- Label: 5 Rue Christine; GER028
- Producer: The Advantage, Eric Broyhill

The Advantage chronology
The Advantage (2004)	Da Advantage EP (2004)

The Advantage is the debut release by American rock band The Advantage. It is their first full-length studio album.

== Track listing ==
=== Original track listing ===
1. Mega Man 2 - Flashman
2. Double Dragon 2 - Stage 2
3. Goonies 2
4. Bubble Bobble
5. Bubble Bobble - Shark Skeleton
6. Wizards and Warriors - Intro
7. Bomberman 2
8. Bionic Commando - P.O.W. Camp
9. Super Mario Bros. 2 - Underworld
10. Super Mario Bros. 2 - Overworld
11. Contra - Snowfields
12. Zelda - Fortress
13. Batman 2
14. Mega Man 3 - Dr. Wiley Stage
15. Double Dragon 2 (story, and boss music)
16. Castlevania 3 - Epitaph
17. Ninja Gaiden - Mine Shaft
18. Mario 3 - Underworld
19. Blastermaster - Stage 2
20. Ghost 'n' Goblins - Intro
21. Ghost 'n' Goblins
22. Castlevania - Stage 3
23. Marble Madness
24. Metal Gear - Jungle
25. Contra - Boss Music
26. Castlevania 3 - Evergreen

=== Revised track listing ===
1. Mega Man II - Flash Man - 2:08
2. Double Dragon II - Mission 2 At the Heliport - 1:45
3. Goonies II - Warp Zone - 2:19
4. Bubble Bobble - Theme - 1:22
5. Bubble Bobble - Shark Skeleton - 0:32
6. Wizards & Warriors - Intro - 1:09
7. Bomberman II - Areas 1,3 & 5 - 2:29
8. Bionic Commando - P.O.W. Camp - 1:09
9. Super Mario Bros. 2 - Underworld - 0:38
10. Super Mario Bros. 2 - Overworld - 1:41
11. Contra - Stage 5 Snow Field - 1:10
12. Legend of Zelda - Dungeon - 1:08
13. Batman 2 - Stage 1 - 2:36
14. Mega Man III - Dr. Wily Stages 3 & 4 - 2:00
15. Double Dragon II - Story & Boss - 1:59
16. Castlevania III: Dracula's Curse - Epitaph - 2:04
17. Ninja Gaiden - Stage 4-2 - 1:51
18. Super Mario Bros. 3 - Underworld - 0:55
19. Blaster Master - Stage 2 - 1:04
20. Ghost 'n' Goblins - Intro - 0:04
21. Ghost 'n' Goblins - Theme - 1:07
22. Castlevania - Stage 3 - 2:13
23. Marble Madness - Stage 2 - 1:22
24. Metal Gear - Jungle - 2:20
25. Contra - Boss - 2:18
26. Castlevania III: Dracula's Curse - Epilogue - 1:59

== Personnel ==
- Nick Rogers - guitar
- Ben Milner - guitar
- Spencer Seim - drums
- Carson McWhirter - bass
