= No More Secrets =

No More Secrets may refer to:

- No More Secrets, 1994 novel by Lilian Darcy
- No More Secrets, 1995 novel by Linda Randall Wisdom
- No More Secrets for Me, child abuse prevention book for children by Jane Aaron
- No More Secrets, 1996 film by Loretta Todd
- No More Secrets, 1999 film by Sylvia Hamilton
- No More Secrets, a 2003 album by Instrumental Quarter
- "No More Secrets", song by Papa Roach from The Paramour Sessions
- "No More Secrets", song by Hed PE from Truth Rising 2010
- "No More Secrets", song by Carolina Liar from Wild Blessed Freedom 2011
