= Triclops =

Triclops can refer to:

- Tri-Klops, a character in the Masters of the Universe toyline
- Triclops, a character in the Jedi Prince series of Star Wars novels
- Triclops, a race of creatures from the 3×3 Eyes anime and manga
- Triclops!, an acid punk band
- Triclops, an anthology of short stories by Avery Mathers, Susan Howe and Lee Williams
- Triclops, an ancient group of three-eyed aliens from anime Dragon Ball
