= Zavalaz =

American rock band (2013–2014)

- Origin: Los Angeles, CA, United States
- Genres: Rock, folk rock
- Years active: 2013-2014
- Past members: Cedric Bixler-Zavala; Dan Elkan; Juan Alderete; Gregory Rogove
- Website: zavalaz.com

Zavalaz is an American rock band from Los Angeles, California, formed in 2013. It features singer and guitarist Cedric Bixler-Zavala, guitarist Dan Elkan, bassist Juan Alderete and drummer Gregory Rogove.

== History ==
The roots of Zavalaz are found in Cedric Bixler-Zavala's solo project he started during the spare time from working on the Mars Volta's Noctourniquet: "It started off with me just having the courage to play my guitar again. My wife would listen to me play and be really encouraging". Bixler-Zavala's newly written, mostly acoustic songs were a departure from his previous work with the Mars Volta and At the Drive-in: on his YouTube page he described them as "mostly ballady type stuff...a very sunday morning record. Very soft". He cited 1970's AM radio hits and the likes of Fleetwood Mac, Neil Young and Roky Erickson as the influences: "It’s part of that classic Southern California ballad music for sure. There’s a lot of harmonies and a lot of me sort of paying homage to the music my parents listened to when I was a little kid".

Following the conclusion of Mars Volta's tour in July 2012, Bixler-Zavala decided to completely focus on his solo record: "I always thought that I could never fully realize any sort of solo thing unless I could put my all into it. Plus, I didn’t like doing anything else because I always felt like, for me, it was a conflict of interest; it would have diluted the band if I would have started doing a grip of solo things". Having initially planned to perform most of the instrumental parts himself, he instead decided to get other musicians to play. He invited his Mars Volta bandmate Juan Alderete, drummer Gregory Rogove (Devendra Banhart, Megapuss), guitarist Dan Elkan (Hella, Them Hills) and keyboard player Nate Walcott. Jonny Polonsky, David Hidalgo, Money Mark, John M. Andersson and Noah Georgeson also have made appearances in the studio. The recording sessions were engineered by Robert Carranza, who previously worked on The Mars Volta's The Bedlam in Goliath: "I think he was a little taken aback that I could do it. He just kept telling me how much he liked [my music], and we kept working on it whenever I had time". Eventually Bixler-Zavala felt like ethically and spiritually it was the right thing to do to make a band, which was named Zavalaz after his mother's maiden name, with a "Z" added to the end. Zavalaz was formally announced on May 15, 2013, with the band's lineup stated to include Bixler-Zavala, Alderete, Rogove and Elkan. The same day, a number of West Coast shows in June supported by Dot Hacker and EV Kain were announced. Zavalaz played its first show at Artifice in Las Vegas on June 15; Nate Walcott has joined the band for the tour.

Zavalaz' debut album, titled All Those Nights We Never Met, was mixed by Noah Georgeson. On June 3, 2013, a snippet from song "Blue Rose of Grand Street" was released on YouTube. Later sessions also involved producer Dave Friedmann. The album however was never finished, and following the formation of Antemasque in 2014 the whole project was put on hold. Bixler-Zavala's post on Instagram in May 2014 stated that the album was still going to be finished sometime in the future when money and schedules would allow that: "I have twin boys that need a dad and mom so my time and priorities are a difficult thing to juggle. It will all happen with time".

== Members ==
- Cedric Bixler-Zavala - lead vocals, guitars
- Dan Elkan - guitar, backing vocals
- Juan Alderete - bass, backing vocals
- Gregory Rogove - drums, backing vocals

Touring members:

- Nate Walcott - keyboards
- Josh Klinghoffer - keyboards (Alaska 2013 shows)

== Discography ==
=== Albums ===
- All Those Nights We Never Met (TBA)
