= Howard Hello =

American musical group

- Origin: San Diego, California
- Label: Temporary Residence Limited
- Past members: Kenseth Thibideau; Marty Anderson; Wendy Allen

Howard Hello is an American musical group from San Diego, California.

Howard Hello was formed by Kenseth Thibideau as a side project from Tarentel in 2001, along with Marty Anderson of Dilute and Wendy Allen of The Court & Spark. They released one album, two EPs and a compilation through Temporary Residence Limited. Raymond Raposa of Castanets played with the band in 2002.

== Discography ==
- Howard Hello (Temporary Residence, 2002)
- Don't Drink His Blood (Temporary Residence, 2003)
- Howard Hello EP (Temporary Residence, 2005)
- Howard Hello + Greenness (with Greenness) (Temporary Residence, 2007)
- Election Year (Temporary Residence, 2017)
