= Hold Your Horse Is =

Studio album by Hella
- Released: March 19, 2002
- Recorded: November 2001
- Genre: Math rock; noise rock; instrumental rock
- Length: 34:04
- Label: 5 Rue Christine
- Producer: Hella

Hella chronology
Leather Diamond (2001)	Hold Your Horse Is (2002)	Falam Dynasty (2002)

Professional ratings
Review scores
Source	Rating
AllMusic	4/5 stars
Ox-Fanzine	9/10
Pitchfork	8.3/10
Stylus Magazine	B+

Hold Your Horse Is is the debut studio album by American math rock band Hella. It was released on March 19, 2002, through 5 Rue Christine, a sub-label of Kill Rock Stars. It remains a highly influential album within the math rock genre.

Three of the songs on Hold Your Horse Is ("Republic of Rough and Ready", "Biblical Violence" & "City Folk Sitting, Sitting") were re-recorded from the band's debut EP, Leather Diamond.

== Track listing ==
All tracks are written by Hella.

No.	Title	Length
1.	"The D.Elkan"	0:43
2.	"Biblical Violence"	3:03
3.	"Been a Long Time Cousin"	3:50
4.	"Republic of Rough and Ready"	3:44
5.	"1-800-Ghost-Dance"	3:44
6.	"Brown Metal"	3:54
7.	"Cafeteria Bananas"	3:40
8.	"City Folk Sitting, Sitting"	7:06
9.	"Better Get a Broom!"	4:20

== Personnel ==
Personnel per liner notes.

Hella

- Spencer Seim - guitar
- Zach Hill - drums

Production

- Hella - production
- Aaron Prellwitz - engineer, mixing, recording
- Galen Baudhuin - assistant engineer
- George Horn - mastering
