= Spencer Seim =

American musician (born 1981)

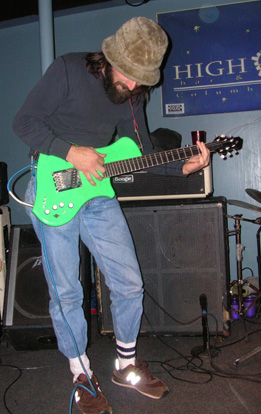
- Seim in 2005

Background information
- Born: January 28, 1981 (age 45)
- Genres: Math rock, experimental rock, noise rock, instrumental rock
- Occupation: Musician
- Instrument: Electric guitar

Spencer Seim (born January 28, 1981) is an American musician, best known as the guitarist in the band Hella. He is also the drummer in the Nintendocore band The Advantage and has a solo project named sBACH. The sticker on the cover of the self-titled sBACH release says "a thousand times better than Hella or The Advantage".

== Discography ==
=== Solo releases ===
==== as sBACH ====
- "sBACH" (August 19, 2008, Suicide Squeeze)

=== With Byre ===
- "Here in Dead Lights" (May 15, 2018, Joyful Noise Recordings)

=== With Solos ===
- "Beast of Both Worlds" (September 11, 2012, Joyful Noise Recordings)
- "SoloS" (April 17, 2020, Dowd Records)

=== With Crock ===
- "Grok" (September 27, 2011, Jackpot Records)

=== With The Advantage ===
- The Advantage (April 6, 2004, 5RC)
- 2004 West Coast Tour CD (February 2004, self-released)
- 2004 US Tour CD (October 2004, self-released)
- Elf Titled (January 24, 2006, 5RC)
- "Underwear: So Big!" 2006 Tour CD-R (August 2006, self-released)

=== With Hella ===
==== Albums ====
- Hold Your Horse Is CD/LP (2002, 5RC)
- The Devil Isn't Red CD (2004, 5RC)
- Church Gone Wild/Chirpin' Hard 2xCD (2005, Suicide Squeeze)
- There's No 666 in Outer Space CD (2007, Ipecac Recordings)
- Tripper CD (2011, Sargent House)

==== EPs ====
- Leather Diamond CD-R EP (2001)
- Falam Dynasty 7" (2002, 5RC)
- Bitches Ain't Shit But Good People EP (2003, Suicide Squeeze)
- Total Bugs Bunny On Wild Bass EP (2003, Narnack Records)
- Acoustics EP (2004 & 2005, Toad Records (Japan); 2006, 5RC (US), with additional songs)
- Concentration Face/Homeboy DVD/CD EP (2005, 5RC)

==== Split releases ====
- Live 2xCD (Sick Room, October 10, 2003) (with Dilute)
- Hella/Four Tet Split 7" (Ache, March 12, 2004) (with Four Tet)
