= Cusp (album) =

Studio album by Alela Diane
- Released: February 9, 2018
- Studio: Flora Recording & Playback
- Length: 38:08
- Label: AllPoints
- Producer: Peter M. Murray

Alela Diane chronology
| Cold Moon (2015) | Cusp (2018) | Looking Glass (2022) |

Professional ratings
Aggregate scores
| Source | Rating |
|---|---|
| Metacritic | 87/100 |
Review scores
| Source | Rating |
| The 405 | 8/10 |
| The Guardian | 4/5 stars |
| MusicOMH | 5/5 stars |
| PopMatters | 8/10 |
| Sputnikmusic | 3.8/5 |

Cusp is the sixth studio album by American singer-songwriter Alela Diane. It was released on February 9, 2018, by AllPoints Recordings.

== Production ==
The album was recorded at Flora Recording & Playback, alongside producer Peter M. Murray.

== Release ==
The first music video to "Émigré" was released on December 1, 2017.

The second single "Ether and Wood" was released on January 12, 2018. Diane explained the single "is a reflection on the different lives that are lived within a lifetime. The doors along the way that often open and close without notice. I live in a very old house, and love thinking about all the people who lived and died within these walls."

== Critical reception ==
Cusp was met with "universal acclaim" reviews from critics. At Metacritic, which assigns a weighted average rating out of 100 to reviews from mainstream publications, this release received an average score of 87 based on 7 reviews.

Nicholas Glover of The 405 explained how the album revolves around mother and daughterhood that is "brought to life in the music by a straightened, glittering piano backing and gently pulling strings." Writing for The Guardian, Dave Simpson said: "Her thoughtful, dreamy vocals drift across a grand piano, providing both pretty and wistful songs with emotional wallop. The album title comes from [Diane]'s near-death during childbirth, and her subsequent realisation that we are forever "on the cusp" between death and life, heartbreak and euphoria, all of which are in fulsome supply here."

== Chart performance ==
The release appeared on international charts, debuting at number 109 on the Belgian Ultratop Flanders chart, number 88 on the Belgian Ultratop Wallonia chart, number 106 in France, number 173 in Netherlands, and number 84 in Switzerland.

== Track listing ==
Cusp track listing
| No. | Title | Length |
|---|---|---|
| 1. | "Albatross" | 3:53 |
| 2. | "The Threshold" | 2:58 |
| 3. | "Moves Us Blind" | 2:57 |
| 4. | "Émigré" | 3:11 |
| 5. | "Never Easy" | 3:43 |
| 6. | "Song for Sandy" | 3:45 |
| 7. | "Buoyant" | 3:15 |
| 8. | "Ether & Wood" | 4:23 |
| 9. | "Yellow Gold" | 3:20 |
| 10. | "So Tired" | 3:43 |
| 11. | "Wild Ceaseless Song" | 3:00 |

== Charts ==
Chart performance for Cusp
| Chart (2018) | Peak position |
|---|---|
| Belgian Albums (Ultratop Flanders) | 109 |
| Belgian Albums (Ultratop Wallonia) | 88 |
| French Albums (SNEP) | 106 |
| Dutch Albums (Album Top 100) | 173 |
| Swiss Albums (Schweizer Hitparade) | 84 |
