= Alela Diane & Wild Divine =

Studio album by Alela Diane
- Released: April 5, 2011
- Genre: Indie folk, folk rock
- Length: 38:28
- Label: Rough Trade Records

Alela Diane chronology
To Be Still (2009)	Alela Diane & Wild Divine (2011)	About Farewell (2013)

Professional ratings
Review scores
Source	Rating
AllMusic	3.5/5 stars
Pitchfork	(7.5/10)

Alela Diane & Wild Divine is the third studio album by indie folk musician Alela Diane, released April 5, 2011 on Rough Trade Records. It was her sole album to feature the backing band Wild Divine, which included her father, Tom Menig (guitar), as well as her then-husband Tom Bevitori (guitar), Jonas Haskins (bass) and Jason Merculief (drums).

== Track listing ==
All tracks are written by Alela Diane Menig (except where noted).

No.	Title	Writer(s)	Length
1.	"To Begin"		3:33
2.	"Elijah"		3:15
3.	"Long Way Down"	Alela Diane Menig/Tom Bevitori	3:04
4.	"Suzanne"	Alela Diane Menig/Tom Menig	4:11
5.	"The Wind"	Alela Diane Menig/Bevitori	4:30
6.	"Of Many Colors"	Alela Diane Menig/Tom Menig	4:31
7.	"Desire"	Alela Diane Menig/Bevitori	2:18
8.	"Heartless Highway"		3:36
9.	"White Horse"	Alela Diane Menig/Bevitori	4:20
10.	"Rising Greatness"	Alela Diane Menig/Tom Menig	4:43

== Bonus disc ==
Independent music stores in the UK sold the album with a bonus disc, titled Home Recording & B-Sides from the Wild Divine Sessions, with the following tracks:

1. "Adelaide"
2. "Eastward Still"
3. "Desire (Piano Demo)"
4. "Long Way Down (Acoustic Demo)"
5. "Creek Don't Rise"
6. "The Way It Is"
