= Alexis Gideon =

American visual artist, director, composer and performer

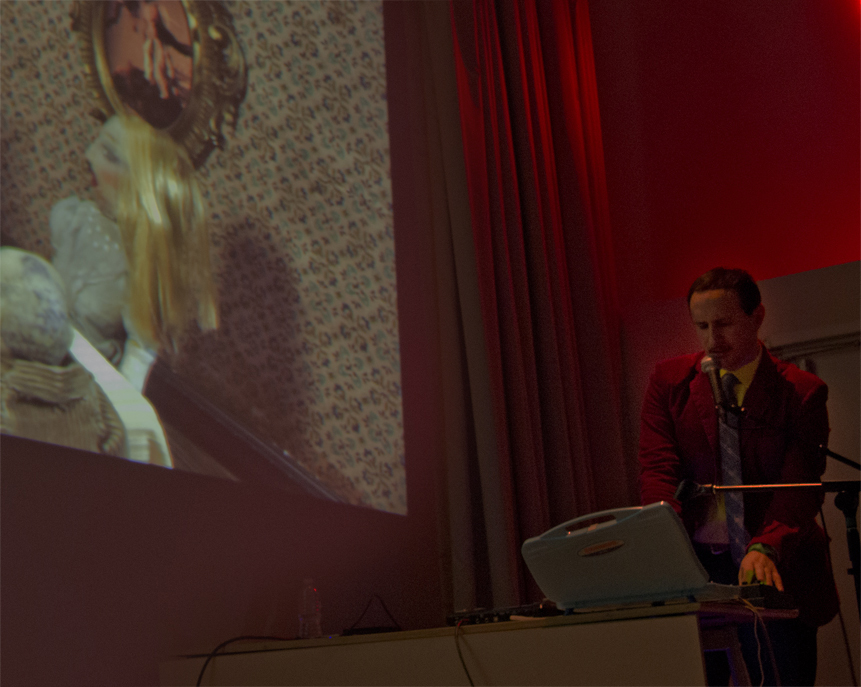
- Alexis Gideon performing at Manhattan's New Museum January 17, 2013

Alexis Gideon (born December 24, 1980) is a visual artist, director, composer, performer, and educator best known for his animated video operas. In 2013, Manhattan’s New Museum of Contemporary Art paired Gideon with William Kentridge in a joint program. Gideon has performed his video operas over 400 times at various venues including Centro de Arte Contemporáneo de Málaga (2016), Institute of Contemporary Art, Boston (2015), Yerba Buena Center for the Arts (San Francisco) (2015), Moderna Museet in Stockholm, Sweden (2014), Museum of Contemporary Art Cleveland (2014), Museum of Contemporary Art, Chicago (2013), Museum of Contemporary Art, Tucson (2013), Oklahoma City Museum of Art (2013), Portland Art Museum (2013), Wexner Center for the Arts (2012), Times Zone Festival (Bari, Italy) (2010), Sudpol (Luzerne, Switzerland) (2010), Centre d'Art Bastille (Grenoble, France) (2010), Baltimore Museum of Art (2009). Gideon is notable for his fusion of music, visuals, literature, and mythology. Gideon's work is in the collection of the Thomas J. Watson Library at the Metropolitan Museum of Art in New York, NY, the Spencer Museum of Art in Lawrence, Kansas as well as in the Debra & Dennis Scholl Collection in Miami, Florida. Gideon has been cited as a vital and visionary artist, both in the US and internationally.

== Early life and education ==
Gideon was born and raised in New York City. He graduated from Fiorello H. LaGuardia High School for Music & Art and the Performing Arts. Gideon attended Wesleyan University under the mentorships of Anthony Braxton and Neely Bruce, graduating in 2003 with a major in musical composition and performance.

In 2003, Gideon formed the experimental performance art band Princess with Michael O’Neill (MEN (band)) while living in Chicago.

Gideon began producing music as a solo artist in 2006, and released two solo albums. He is a multi-instrumentalist, and regularly switches between guitar, percussion, horns, harp and electronic instruments while performing. He has toured nationally with Dan Deacon.

In 2008, Gideon released his multimedia opus, Video Musics. The piece would become the first in a series of three animated operas that feature multicultural literary texts as their starting point.

== Work chronology ==
Music

2005 Princess (band) CD (Sickroom Records)

2007 Welcome Song CD (Sickroom Records)

2008 Flight of the Liophant CD (Sickroom Records)

Animated Video Operas

2008 Video Musics

Video Musics (also known as Video Musics I). Thematically based in Hungarian folk tales, the work combines a number of drawing and animation techniques with recorded music and live performance. Gideon toured the 20-minute piece for two months throughout the United States and Europe, including performances at The Baltimore Museum of Art and Fleche D’Or (Paris, France).

2010 Video Musics II: Sun Wu-Kong

Video Musics II: Sun-WuKong is an hour-long piece is based on the 16th Century Chinese novel Journey to the West. It has been performed live over 100 times in nine countries at venues including SUNY Stony Brook, Kawenga (Montpellier, France) and Sudpol (Luzerne, Switzerland). The Confucius Institute of Portland State University sponsored multiple performances. Gideon was awarded a project grant from the Regional Arts & Culture Council of Oregon to create the piece.

2012 Video Musics III: Floating Oceans

Video Musics III: Floating Oceans is a reworking of the metaphysical works of Lord Dunsany and draws from An Experiment with Time by J. W. Dunne, both early 20th century Irish writers. The piece uses stop-motion animation exclusively. Cynthia Star (Paranorman, Adult Swim, Coraline (film)), who co-animated Video Musics II with Gideon, was Artistic Director. The 40-minute film toured as a live performance nationally and internationally. It has been performed 70 times including at Manhattan's New Museum for Contemporary Art, and Museum of Contemporary Art, Chicago. The Regional Arts & Culture Council of Oregon awarded Gideon his second project grant to create the piece.

2015 The Crumbling

The Crumbling is a 21-minute stop-motion animation video opera set in a dream-like mythic town following the trials of an apprentice librarian as she tries to save her city from crumbling down around her. The piece explores the importance of word and symbol in a decaying culture, as well as the marginalization and persecution of people based on heritage, gender, race or belief, and all that is lost in such persecution. The Crumbling takes a modern and innovative form, while drawing from ancient texts and esoterica such as the Kabbalah, Hermeticism of ancient Egypt, the mystical beliefs of Hildegard of Bingen, Alchemy of the 16th Century, and the mid 19th Century occult beliefs of the Hermetic Brotherhood of Luxor. During screenings, the film is accompanied by live musical performance. The live music mirrors the action exactly, and the animated characters' mouths are perfectly in sync with the sung lyrics. Gideon received an artist-in-residence grant to complete the project from the Investing in Professional Artists Program, a partnership between the Heinz Endowments and the Pittsburgh Foundation. Gideon's The Crumbling has been compared to the work of artist Matthew Barney.

2016 The Comet and the Glacier

The Comet and the Glacier is a multi-media performance piece with an accompanying four-channel video installation. Combining installation, music, video, performance, animation, clay reliefs, and paintings on glass, The Comet and the Glacier is a meditation on memory as a creative act. It was commissioned by Locust Projects in Miami, FL and premiered there November 19, 2016 followed by performances November 28, 29, December 1, 2, 3rd and 4th, 2016 for Art Basel Miami Week. The exhibition ran from November 19, 2016 through January 21, 2017. At the center of the exhibition is a multi-layered narrative surrounding a peculiar, fictional book titled The Almanac: an unpublished, nineteenth-century manuscript written by the imaginary Swiss author Fredrick Otto Bühler, and recently discovered in the home of his last living descendant. Narrated by an artist character named Alexis—based on Gideon himself—the story presents the dilemma of the protagonist’s impossible recollection of the book’s events. He somehow remembers having read these stories during his childhood in New York City. To test whether he had indeed encountered this mysterious text, the character Alexis writes and illustrates a narrative based on one of the chapters drawn from The Almanac’s table of contents: The Comet and the Glacier. Comparing his and Bühler’s versions, the story—and the project as a whole—approaches memory as a creative gesture. The exhibition draws the audience into the unsettling déjà vu of the base story, punctuating the project’s fiction with real historical events and aspects from Gideon’s own life.

2019 Princess: Out There

Princess: Out There is a concept video album and live performance piece by the collaborative art duo Princess (band) (Alexis Gideon and Michael O’Neill). Gideon and O'Neill reformed Princess after a twelve year hiatus. The piece premiered March 2019 at The Andy Warhol Museum followed by a national tour of 59 institutions including 21c Museum Hotels, Bass Museum, Bemis Center for Contemporary Arts, Museum of Contemporary Art San Diego, MIT List Visual Arts Center, Museum of Contemporary Art Cleveland, New Museum, and Wexner Center for the Arts. The piece explores toxic masculinity and the role men ought to be playing during the current cultural reckoning of misogyny. Gideon and O’Neill collaborated with JD Samson, visual artist Jennifer Myers, and Teen (band) to create Out There. The piece has been cited as innovative.

2019 There Is Not an Infinite Space between Two Points

There Is Not an Infinite Space between Two Points is a video performance piece with an accompanying exhibition of light boxes, window murals, and paintings on wood. The music and lyrics of the piece are performed live by Alexis Gideon alongside the video projection. The piece premiered at the Pittsburgh Cultural Trust for the Three Rivers Arts Festival in June 2019. The piece was funded in part by the Investing in Professional Artists Program, a partnership between the Heinz Endowments and the Pittsburgh Foundation. The piece investigates the universality of feelings of loss and displacement as well as the concept of transgenerational trauma through the lens of the personal and collective; the trauma inherited from both the immediate family and the ancestral one.

2020 Princess: @1minworld

@1minworld is a performance and an experimental Instagram video cycle. The premiere was an online broadcast, in partnership with The Andy Warhol Museum and 21c Museum Hotels, that pushed the formal boundaries of online video streaming to challenge the distinction between live performance and pre-recorded video. The performance was recorded at The Warhol theater of The Andy Warhol Museum in 2020. The piece was also shown virtually by the Bemis Center for Contemporary Arts in 2021. Simultaneously, @1minworld has been released on Instagram as a series of 15 distinct one-minute videos that take the platform’s constraints as a challenge to be reckoned with. The video cycle’s primary-colored bubblegum visuals are deployed as a calculated offering to the Instagram algorithm, while the songs’ content highlights the discontents of our social media age: filter bubbles, surveillance capitalism, and shortened attention spans, to name a few.

2021 Modules

Modules Is a one-channel video installation and performance piece using painted animations and photographs that was exhibited at Montana State University Billings's Northcutt Steele Gallery in October 2021. The dreamlike narrative, written during the Trump presidency, explores feelings of isolation and helplessness in a world where action and consequence seem to have no logical relation. The walls of Montana State University Billing’s Northcutt Steele Gallery were painted to mimic the hallway depicted in the video; enabling the audience to step into the immersive sensory experience. The music and lyrics of the piece were performed live by Alexis Gideon alongside the video projection.

2024 Two Books

Two Booksis a meditative, interdisciplinary performance by artist Alexis Gideon and dancer Robin Cantrell that combines video, performance, music, paintings, dance, and holographic photography, inspired by Carl Jung's "The Red Book: Liber Novus". The premiere performance took place at Museum of Contemporary Art Denver April 25th, 2025 and was followed by a talkback hosted by Professor Maria Elena Buszek.
