= Bomberman (1985 video game) =

1985 video game

- North American NES box art
- Developer: Hudson Soft
- Publisher: Hudson Soft (Note: Nintendo published the Classic NES Series re-release.)
- Programmer: Shinichi Nakamoto
- Composer: Jun Chikuma
- Series: Bomberman
- Platforms: Nintendo Entertainment System, MSX, Famicom Disk System, Palm, Game Boy Advance
- Release: December 20, 1985: NES; JP: December 20, 1985; NA: January 1989 MSX; JP: 1986 Famicom Disk System; JP: April 24, 1990 Palm; WW: 2001 Game Boy Advance; JP: February 14, 2004; NA: June 7, 2004; EU: July 9, 2004
- Genres: Action, maze
- Mode: Single-player

Bomberman (Note: Japanese: ボンバーマン, Hepburn: Bonbāman) is an action video game developed and published by Hudson Soft for the Nintendo Entertainment System. Part of the Bomberman franchise, it was first released in Japan on December 20, 1985, and published in North America in January 1989. The player controls the titular character through maze-like levels. The objective is to reach the exit while fighting enemies and destroying blockade with bombs.

Bomberman is an enhanced port of an earlier computer game Bakudan Otoko (1983). Bomberman was programmed by Hudson director Shinichi Nakamoto, who saw potential in Bakudan Otoko and wanted to expand its formula for the console video game market. Bomberman retains the basic gameplay of its predecessor, but has many new elements not found in the original version, including a power-up system that allows the player to accumulate firepower by collecting items and a soundtrack composed by Jun Chikuma.

Hudson claimed Bomberman sold nearly one million copies by 1989; its bombing gameplay and visuals drew mixed reception from contemporary reviews. Nakamoto considered the console port to be the definitive version of his game. It was re-released for numerous platforms such as MSX, Famicom Disk System, and Game Boy Advance. Retrospective reviews recognized it as spawning the Bomberman series with many installments building on its gameplay, but were divided over its simplicity, particularly the lack of multiplayer mode popularized by later Bomberman games. A sequel for the same console, Bomberman II, was released in 1991.

== Gameplay ==
Bomberman in action, defeating several enemies with his bombs

Bomberman is an action and maze game where the player controls the eponymous character through maze levels with a top-down perspective. A bomb production robot working in an underground complex, Bomberman's mission is to escape from the facility, surmount the evil forces attempting to capture him, and reach the surface, upon which he will become a human. Each level contains enemies and randomly generated destructible blocks. Bomberman's primary weapons are his bombs, which are able to take out enemies and demolish blocks. Whenever he sets down a bomb, it explodes after a short delay and shoots jets of fire in all four directions. The main objective is to defeat all enemies in the level and locate the exit concealed under a block.

Hidden inside blocks are an assortment of power-up panels that can boost Bomberman's bombing abilities and grant extra perks. There are two types of power-ups: permanent power-ups, which indefinitely increase Bomberman's blast radius and the number of bombs he can carry; and temporary power-ups, which give him special advantages, such as the ability to walk through blocks or the remote detonator that gives him complete control over when his bombs explode, but only last until he dies.

There are a total of 50 levels to complete. As Bomberman proceeds toward the surface, the levels become more complex and send out more advanced foes. There are eight different enemy types in the game that act in various ways. For example, certain adversaries are capable of moving through blocks, while others move quickly and chase Bomberman. Defeating enemies adds more points to the player's score. Bonus stages infrequently appear between the levels, allowing the player to earn additional points.

Bomberman has several elements which can impede the player. The levels operate under a timer that, if it runs out, will summon additional foes. If a bomb blast strikes an exit, more enemies will spawn, which must also be defeated before the player can progress. When Bomberman is in contact with an enemy or caught in his bomb's explosion, he is killed and loses a life. Bomberman starts with three lives, and earns one for every level cleared out. When all lives are lost, the game declares game over. A password can be used to save and resume the player's progress.

== Development ==
Bomberman is based on Hudson Soft's Bakudan Otoko (1983), also known as Bomber Man, which was originally made for personal computers and created with the BASIC programming language. Shortly after releasing Bakudan Otoko, Hudson entered the console video game market, publishing Lode Runner (1984) and Star Force (1985) for the Family Computer (Famicom), the Japanese version of the Nintendo Entertainment System (NES). The company decided to port over its old computer games to the Famicom, and Bakudan Otoko was selected as its next idea for a new release. The new version of Bomberman was created by Shinichi Nakamoto, a research and development director and programmer at Hudson.

Nakamoto thought Bakudan Otoko had a simple yet compelling formula, but was not expansive enough for the console market, which led to adding many game mechanics to Bomberman not present in the original computer game. He came up with a power-up system, inspired by space-themed shoot 'em ups at the time, so that the player could amass more firepower throughout the game by collecting items. Once the game's basic framework was established, Nakamoto said Hudson wanted to redesign the player character of Bakudan Otoko, an "old man in a hat", who the developer thought would not attract the console gaming userbase. Nakamoto ultimately decided on replacing him with the robot character from Hudson's Famicom port of Lode Runner; his reasoning was that, if the protagonist were a robot, he would not feel too sorry seeing the character blown apart by a bomb. Corroborating this change, Bomberman's ending sees the player character transform into the protagonist of Hudson's Lode Runner, establishing itself as a prequel.

Bomberman was Hudson's first game to use sampled sound effects, utilized for the bomb explosion sound. Nakamoto received recordings of numerous explosions and compared them all until he chose the one that he felt was the most satisfying. The game's soundtrack, a first in the series, was composed by Jun Chikuma. Feeling the chiptune generated by the Famicom's sound processor was suitable for techno, she tried to mix various genres based on techno and electronic music.

== Release ==
Bomberman was first released in Japan on December 20, 1985. It was published in North America in January 1989. The game was re-released for the Famicom Disk System on April 27, 1990.

In 1986, Hudson published an MSX port as Bomberman Special. Bomberman is included as a bonus mode in Atomic Punk (1990) for the Game Boy. A port for Palm mobile devices was released in 2001. Another port was released in 2004 for the Game Boy Advance as part of Nintendo's Classic NES Series line on February 14 in Japan, June 7 in North America, and July 9 in Europe. This version has a save ability for the most recent level password. It was released for the Game Boy Advance again in 2005 via Hudson Best Collection Vol. 1: Bomberman Collection, a dual release also featuring Bomberman II. The NES version was one of the games included in the 2026 compilation Super Bomberman Collection.

== Reception and legacy ==
Upon release, three critics from MSX Magazine, reviewing the MSX version, praised the gameplay mechanics that are easy to understand and progressively upgrade the player character. The password feature was also well received. The character designs and enemy variety drew mixed reactions, with one reviewer calling them charming while the other two were unimpressed. Critics from Computer Entertainer gave the NES version a "Not recommended" rating, criticized the simplistic graphics, and said it is "mildly addictive at first, but we soon became bored with it." Leslie Mizell of Game Player's recommended it for inexperienced audiences owning the NES, saying its password feature is useful, despite its monotonous gameplay due to the repetitive level arrangement. However, he criticized the password's long length. The North American box art of the NES version claims Bomberman sold nearly a million copies in Japan by the time it was published in North America in 1989.

In retrospect, Bomberman is considered a notable release by both the developer and reviewers. Nakamoto stated in 1995, "I personally believe that the Famicom version of Bomberman is the one and only version of the game." Reviewers regarded the NES Bomberman as the starting point of the Bomberman franchise and the one that helped establish its fundamental gameplay. However, the absence of multiplayer mode was noted, a feature popularized by future Bomberman games. Critics of the Classic NES Series re-issue were divided over whether the game was still worth playing in spite of its simplicity in comparison to more recent Bomberman games. Nintendojo, Play, and GamePro found it enjoyable and recommended the game. By contrast, 1UP.com, GameSpot, and IGN cited the lack of multiplayer as a reason the re-release was disappointing.

Hudson later released Bomberman (1990) for the TurboGrafx-16, which revisited the same gameplay formula and added in multiplayer components. Bomberman II was released in 1991 for the NES.
