= Princess (band) =

American art-pop band and performance duo

Princess is an American high-concept art-pop band and performance duo formed in 2004 and reinitiated in 2017 by Alexis Gideon and Michael O’Neill. Their performances and music challenge traditional understandings of art classifications and explore queerness through futuristic video, gender-bending costumes, and vocals and instrumentals drawing inspiration from a variety of musical genres.

== History ==
=== Early years ===
After meeting through artist friend Andy Meerow as undergraduate students in colleges in the Northeast, Gideon at Wesleyan University and O'Neill at Hampshire College, the duo experimented with improvisation, hip hop, and comedy, with projects including a rock opera with characters from Saved by the Bell. They explored a variety of musical styles, at one point entering a Battle of the Bands competition with songs and costume changes for five different fake groups performing a range from bossa nova to acid rock. In 2003, they moved to Chicago's DIY art space Texas Ballroom and formed the art band Princess.

Their early sound was described by Sick Room Records as a "gauntlet of experimental math-rock," with a wide variety of style inspirations and dozens of instrumental voices. Exploring ideas of femininity and masculinity, the pair frequently wore tutus, dresses, leotards, and other garments typically associated with women, incorporating gender fluidity into their performances.

For the release of their 2005 self-titled album, the band toured nationally and shared stages with The Aluminum Group, Scream Club, Barr, and the Coughs, to promote their work. Reviewers commented on the album's genre-defying qualities, noting its experimental, mutant, and idiosyncratic characteristics and struggling to compare it to other contemporary music acts.

=== Hiatus ===
Princess dissolved in 2006. During the group's hiatus, both Gideon and O'Neill pursued other art-based paths. O'Neill moved to Brooklyn and was active with indie bands Hirsute, MEN, Ladybug Transistor, The Point, Grateful Dead tribute band, High Time, and CRICKETS with JD Samson and Roddy Bottum. Gideon made the switch into visual arts performing his animated video operas at art museums around the world including at Institute of Contemporary Art, Boston (2015), Moderna Museet in Stockholm, Sweden (2014), Museum of Contemporary Art, Chicago (2013), and New Museum of Contemporary Art.

=== Reinitiation ===
In 2017, O'Neill and Gideon reunited for a collaborative EP based on the Four Elements. As Gideon says, "Towards the end of working on this, we looked at each other and said, ‘I guess Princess is back together.’”

The group's next project, a video album and live performance piece, continued their experimental thrust while responding to the political climate during its writing. Gideon and O'Neill cite the sci-fi genre, the cultural power of MTV, concept pieces like Deltron 3030, and activist movements like the Women's March and #metoo as inspiration for "Out There." Continuing their earlier work engaging with themes of gender, the group stated the album put forward "the role men ought to be playing during the current cultural reckoning of misogyny." This feminist political direction was reinforced in the rock opera, as the title card for the performance's video reads, “2028: Proclaiming Earth to be a misogynistic dystopia, the art-pop super duo Princess prepares a rocket ship to find a better world. As only two white men could.” Narrative-forward lyrics present battles with misogyny and toxic masculinity, searching for a futuristic utopia. Accompanying stop-action animation showed the duo exploring a vividly hued outer space, while energetic rap overlays electric guitar and keyboard. Gender-defying costumes, at times recalling garments worn during the group's earlier work, extend themes of queerness and the power of the Divine Feminine explored throughout the video. Acknowledging the problematic nature of a male duo speaking on such a female-centered topic, Gideon and O'Neill invited collaborators, which included rock band TEEN, artist Jennifer Meyers, and singer JD Samson.

Performed in costume with pre-recorded video and live music, the 16-song, 55-minute album premiered at the Andy Warhol Museum. With a focus on reaching art museum goers, many stops on their tour were booked at cultural institutions, including performances at 21c Museum Hotels, The Bass Museum, Bemis Center for Contemporary Arts, MIT List Visual Arts Center, Museum of Contemporary Art Cleveland, Museum of Contemporary Art San Diego, New Museum of Contemporary Art, and Wexner Center for the Arts.

== Discography ==
- LP album, "Princess," 2005
- Video album, "Out There," 2019
