= Team Sleep =

American rock band

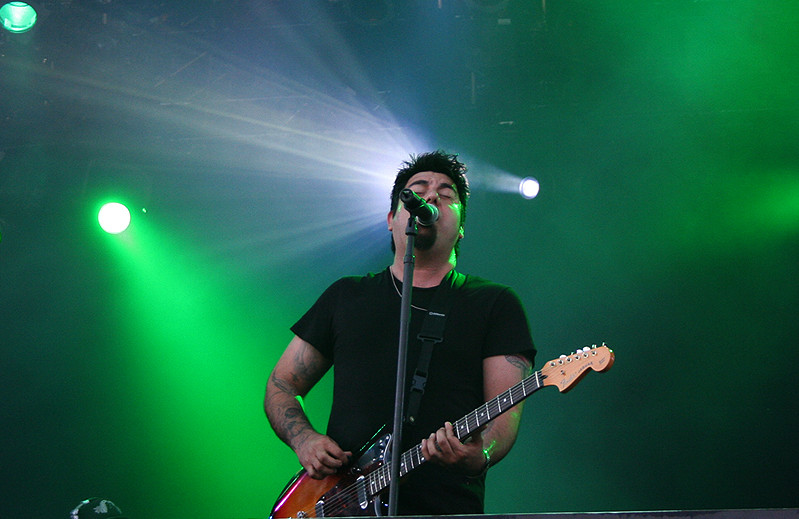
- Vocalist Chino Moreno performing live

Background information
- Origin: Sacramento, California, U.S.
- Genres: Alternative rock; experimental rock; post-rock; dream pop; trip hop; indie rock; electronic rock
- Years active: 2000–2006, 2014–2015 (on hiatus)
- Label: Maverick
- Members: Chino Moreno; Todd Wilkinson; CrookOne; Rick Verrett; Chuck Doom; Gil Sharone
- Past members: Rob Crow; Zach Hill; Dan Elkan; Sonny Mayugba; Joel Tidwell; Mary Timony

Team Sleep is an American rock supergroup led by singer/guitarist Chino Moreno. Moreno is better known for fronting the Sacramento-based alternative metal band Deftones. Other recent members include guitarist Todd Wilkinson, keyboardist and turntablist CrookOne, bass guitarist and keyboardist Rick Verrett, drummer Gil Sharone, and bassist Chuck Doom, with past members Zach Hill, Rob Crow, Mary Timony, and Dan Elkan contributing significantly to the band’s debut album.

Team Sleep's music touches on a variety of genres, including dream pop, trip hop, indie rock, post-rock, ambient music, psychedelic music, lo-fi music, and electronica.

== History ==
=== Early years ===
Team Sleep started when Moreno and his friend Todd Wilkinson bought a cassette tape Portastudio-type four-track recorder in 1994. They continued this collaboration through the first two Deftones albums, though on a rather casual basis. Wilkinson said, "We were never going to make a record, or start a band ... I was just sitting at home, playing guitar, and I started recording some stuff. It was never about trying to play shows, record in a studio, or anything of that sort. It was just bumming around. I had never been in a band, and I never wanted to be—we were just good friends."

DJ Crook, or CrookOne, a long-time friend and roommate of Deftones turntablist/keyboardist Frank Delgado, added beats and turntables to "Teenager", a song featuring glitch and trip hop influences. Originally intended as a Team Sleep song, "Teenager" was ultimately included on White Pony (2000), the third Deftones album.

Team Sleep performed a number of live shows on the West Coast of the United States in late 2001 and early 2002, with Moreno, Wilkinson, DJ Crook (aka CrookOne), Verrett (of Tinfed), Zach Hill (Hella, later of Death Grips), Dan Elkan (Pocket for Corduroy/Them Hills), Sonny Mayugba (of Phallucy, the prior band of Deftones drummer Abe Cunningham) and Joel Tidwell handling instrumentation. Their early live set included a loose cover of the Smashing Pumpkins' "The Aeroplane Flies High (Turns Left, Looks Right)", among others.

=== Debut album ===
A full album's worth of material was finished in 2002–03, but not officially released. The instrumental song "The Passportal" was included on The Matrix Reloaded: The Album, the April 2003 soundtrack album for the film The Matrix Reloaded.

Singers Mike Patton (Mr. Bungle, Fantomas, Faith No More) and Melissa Auf der Maur (ex-Hole, ex-Smashing Pumpkins) were involved in recording sessions, but their contributions were not included on the final album. Singers Rob Crow (of San Diego-based band Pinback) and Mary Timony (of the band Helium) were the only vocalists other than Moreno to appear on the album.

Team Sleep's record was originally scheduled for release in November 2004, but Maverick Records were reportedly so impressed by the album that they postponed the release until mid-2005 to allow for promotion. The debut album contained only five of the original tracks; three of those were heavily reworked. In October 2004, DJ C-Minus premiered the Team Sleep demo "Cambodia" while opening for Deftones at a concert at House of Blues in West Hollywood. The title of this song, which was co-written with producer Greg Wells, was later changed to "Ever (Foreign Flag)". The official Team Sleep website appeared in early 2005 and included songs and videos for free downloading.

Team Sleep was finally released on May 10, 2005, to mostly positive reviews. "The best part about it is having completion of something you've been working on, and having it done right," Moreno said in a statement. "It's fun, working with different people, everybody works differently. When I have time off from music, I want to make other music. That's what I do, that's what's fun, that's what makes me happy."

Notably absent from the completed debut album were "Mercedes", "Apollonia", "Iceache", "Death by Plane", "Solid Gold", "Acoustic One" and "Kool-Aid Party" (which featured Mike Patton as a guest vocalist). The demo of "Cambodia" was revamped and appeared on the album in the form of "Ever (Foreign Flag)", while "Natalie Portman" was revised into "Live from the Stage".

Following Team Sleep's first release, the band toured and began posting various demos on their MySpace page.

=== Return ===
In October 2014, a new Team Sleep lineup recorded a live album in front of an audience at Applehead Recording studio in Woodstock, New York. The members included Moreno, Wilkinson, Verret and DJ Crook as well as bassist Chuck Doom (also of Moreno's Crosses) and drummer Gil Sharone (ex-Marilyn Manson, ex-Dillinger Escape Plan). The record, self-released in July 2015, consisted of reworkings of both tracks from the first album tracks as well as unreleased old demos.

On May 9, 2024, Team Sleep released the Deluxe Edition of their eponymous record, including official mixes of previously unreleased tracks "Kool-Aid Party" (retitled "Kool Aide"), featuring Mike Patton, and "Let's Go," featuring Mary Timony.

== Discography ==
Studio albums

Title	Album details	Peak chart positions			
Title	Album details	US	AUS	FRA	UK
Team Sleep	Released: May 9, 2005; Label: Maverick	52	69	160	91

Live albums

Title	Album details
Woodstock Sessions, Vol. 4	Released: July 10, 2015; Label: Self-released
