= Sick Room Records =

Former record label

Sick Room Records Ltd. (often referred to as Sickroom) was an independent record label based in Chicago, Illinois. The label was founded in 2001 by Mitch Cheney and Steve Sostak of the band Sweep the Leg Johnny and Ryan Duncan. The label put out releases that can fall into the categories of indie rock, post rock, math rock, noise rock and punk rock. The label closed in 2017.

== Roster ==
- Alexis Gideon
- AM Syndicate
- The Afflictions
- The Ants
- Bear Claw
- Bottles And Skulls
- Che Arthur
- Check Engine
- Cheval De Frise
- Chevreuil
- The Conformists
- Detective Instinct
- Dilute
- The Distances
- Drums & Tuba
- Form And Mess
- Form Of Rocket
- Freddie T. And The People
- The Gary
- Greenness
- Hella
- Hyrrokkin
- Instrumental Quarter
- The Julius Airwave
- Just A Fire
- Kash
- King Champion Sounds
- Kippi's
- L'Ocelle Mare
- Lozenge
- Martha's Vineyard Ferries
- Marvin
- Mass Shivers
- Mike Lust
- Papier Tigre
- Passe Montagne
- Pink Mountain
- Phantom Works
- Princess
- Push-Pull
- Quatre Tete
- Radiant Republic
- Rockets Red Glare
- Rumah Sakit
- Runner
- Sleepytime Gorilla Museum
- Sweep the Leg Johnny
- Ten Grand
- Them Roaring Twenties
- Three Second Kiss
- Tic Code
- Transmontane
- Triclops!
- We Ride On

== See also ==
- List of record labels
- Independent record labels
