= About Farewell =

Studio album by Alela Diane
- Released: July 30, 2013
- Genre: Indie folk
- Length: 33:00
- Label: Rusted Blue Records

Alela Diane chronology
Alela Diane & Wild Divine (2011)	About Farewell (2013)	Cusp (2018)

Professional ratings
Aggregate scores
Source	Rating
Metacritic	81/100
Review scores
Source	Rating
AllMusic	4/5 stars
MusicOMH	4.5/5 stars
NME	3.5/5 stars
PopMatters	9/10

About Farewell is the fourth studio album by indie folk musician Alela Diane. It was released July 30, 2013 on her own Rusted Blue Records.

== Track listing ==
No.	Title	Length
1.	"Colorado Blue"	3:29
2.	"About Farewell"	3:20
3.	"The Way We Fall"	5:04
4.	"Nothing I Can Do"	2:24
5.	"Lost Land"	3:26
6.	"I Thought I Knew"	2:08
7.	"Before the Leaving"	2:56
8.	"Hazel Street"	3:10
9.	"Black Sheep"	3:53
10.	"Rose & Thorn"	3:10

== Charts ==
Chart	Peak position
Belgian Albums (Ultratop Flanders)	71
Belgian Albums (Ultratop Wallonia)	86
Dutch Albums (Album Top 100)	32
French Albums (SNEP)	31
