= The Pirate's Gospel =

Studio album by Alela Diane
- Released: 2004
- Recorded: Nevada City, California; Summer 2004
- Genre: Indie folk, psychedelic folk
- Length: 43:56
- Label: Holocene Music
- Producer: Tom Menig

Alela Diane chronology
The Pirate's Gospel (2004)	To Be Still (2009)

Professional ratings
Review scores
Source	Rating
AllMusic	3.5/5 stars
Drowned in Sound	(8/10)
NME	(7/10)
Spin	3.5/5 stars

The Pirate's Gospel is the debut studio album by indie folk musician Alela Diane, originally self-released on CD-R in 2004. It was reissued by Holocene Music in 2006.

== Track listing ==
All tracks are written by Alela Diane Menig.

No.	Title	Length
1.	"The Rifle"	2:47
2.	"Foreign Tongue"	3:27
3.	"The Pirate's Gospel"	3:00
4.	"Pink Roses"	2:15
5.	"My Tired Feet"	2:45
6.	"Gypsy Eyes"	3:14
7.	"Pieces of String"	2:55
8.	"Mother's Love"	2:34
9.	"Somethin's Gone Awry"	1:11
10.	"Heavy Walls"	3:35
11.	"Laundry Mat Lady"	3:32
12.	"Clickity Clack"	3:52
13.	"Pigeon Song"	2:16
14.	"Oh! My Mama"	3:18
15.	"Sister Self"	3:23

=== 2006 track listing ===
All tracks are written by Alela Diane Menig.

No.	Title	Length
1.	"Tired Feet"	2:41
2.	"The Rifle"	2:43
3.	"The Pirate's Gospel"	2:55
4.	"Foreign Tongue"	3:21
5.	"Can You Blame the Sky?" (same song as "Mother's Love" from the original release)	2:28
6.	"Something's Gone Awry"	1:06
7.	"Pieces of String"	2:51
8.	"Clickity Clack"	3:50
9.	"Sister Self"	3:25
10.	"Pigeon Song"	2:12
11.	"Oh! My Mama"	4:14
12.	"Heavy Walls" (UK and vinyl bonus track)	3:29
13.	"Gypsy Eyes" (UK and vinyl bonus track)	3:11
