= Team Sleep (album) =

2005 studio album by Team Sleep

Studio album by Team Sleep
- Released: May 9, 2005 (Europe); May 10, 2005 (United States)
- Recorded: 2000–2004
- Genres: Alternative rock; electronic; trip hop; shoegaze
- Length: 53:59
- Label: Maverick
- Producers: Greg Wells; Team Sleep; Ross Robinson; Terry Date

Team Sleep chronology
Team Sleep (2005)	Woodstock Sessions, Vol. 4 (2015)

Singles from Team Sleep
- 1. "Ever (Foreign Flag)" Released: April 25, 2005

Professional ratings
Review scores
Source	Rating
AllMusic	3/5 stars
Drowned in Sound	6/10
The Encyclopedia of Popular Music	3/5 stars
IGN	7.1/10
Kerrang!	4/5 stars
Now	3/5 stars
Pitchfork	6.1/10
Rock Hard	8.5/10
RTÉ	3/5 stars
Stylus	C

Team Sleep is the only studio album by American rock band Team Sleep. It was largely produced by Greg Wells. It was released in Europe on May 9, 2005, and a day later in the United States through Maverick Records.

== Recording history ==
The debut album by Team Sleep was supposed to be released in 2003 but was scrapped due to the premature leakage of demos from the album onto the internet. The band split for a brief period of time before joining and making material for a new album. Issues with Maverick Records as well as commitments with other projects (most specifically singer Chino Moreno and his band Deftones) delayed the release of the album numerous times. In early 2005, the official May 10 release was announced for the States with the announcement of a new track list and a band site on Maverick's web site.

Some of the songs presented on the new album are altered or re-recorded versions of older Team Sleep songs. For example, "Ever" is actually one of Team Sleep's oldest songs, originally titled "Cambodia" and later "Foreign Flag". "Live from the Stage" is a restructured version of the original Team Sleep song "Natalie Portman". "King Diamond" appears remastered, with Mary Timony contributing extensive call-and-response vocals. "Tomb of Liegia" is a little-changed update of leaked song "Ligeia", also featuring Timony. The title of the song references Edgar Allan Poe's short story, "Ligeia", and its Roger Corman/Vincent Price film adaptation, while the lyrics are more broadly Poe-esque.

On May 9, 2024, Team Sleep released the Deluxe Edition of the record with official mixes of previously unreleased tracks "Kool-Aid Party" (retitled "Kool Aide"), featuring Mike Patton, and "Let's Go," featuring Mary Timony.

== Artwork ==
The cover photo was shot by Lionel Deluy while the creative direction was led by Frank Maddocks (a Deftones companion since 2000's White Pony).

== Commercial performance ==
The album debuted at #52 on the Billboard 200, selling 18,159 copies in its first week.

== Track listing ==
No.	Title	Writer(s)	Producer(s)	Length
1.	"Ataraxia"	Chino Moreno; Rick Verrett; C-Minus	Team Sleep	3:17
2.	"Ever (Foreign Flag)"	Todd Wilkinson; CrookOne; Moreno	Greg Wells	2:51
3.	"Your Skull Is Red"	Moreno; Wilkinson; Zach Hill; Dan Elkan; Verrett	Team Sleep	3:41
4.	"Princeton Review"	Rob Crow; Wilkinson; CrookOne	Wells	5:09
5.	"Blvd. Nights"	Moreno; Wilkinson; Hill	Ross Robinson; Team Sleep	3:08
6.	"Delorian"	Wilkinson; CrookOne	Team Sleep	1:34
7.	"Our Ride to the Rectory"	Moreno; Wilkinson; CrookOne; Crow	Wells	4:40
8.	"Tomb of Liegia"	Mary Timony; CrookOne; Wilkinson	Terry Date	4:56
9.	"Elizabeth"	Moreno; Wilkinson; Hill; Verrett	Wells	3:47
10.	"Staring at the Queen"	CrookOne; Wilkinson	Team Sleep	3:05
11.	"Ever Since WWI"	Crow; Wilkinson; Hill; Verrett	Wells	3:30
12.	"King Diamond"	CrookOne; Moreno; Timony	Date	3:45
13.	"Live from the Stage"	Moreno; Wilkinson; Hill	Robinson; Team Sleep	5:29
14.	"Paris Arm"	CrookOne; Wilkinson	Team Sleep	1:43
15.	"11/11"	Crow; Wilkinson; CrookOne	Wells	3:18
Total length:				53:59

Deluxe edition
No.	Title	Writer(s)	Length
16.	"Let's Go" (featuring Mary Timony)	CrookOne; Wilkinson; Timony	3:23
17.	"Kool Aide" (featuring Mike Patton)	Moreno; Wilkinson; CrookOne; Mike Patton	5:22
Total length:			60:02

== Personnel ==
Team Sleep

- Chino Moreno – vocals (1, 2, 3, 5, 7, 11, 12, 13, 15); guitar (2, 5, 13); piano (8, 17); keyboards (8)
- Todd Wilkinson – guitar (all, except 12); keyboards (3, 4, 9); bass (4, 9, 11)
- Rick Verrett – bass (1, 5, 7, 13, 15); guitar (1); keyboards (1, 3, 4, 5, 7, 12)
- CrookOne – drum programming (2, 4, 6, 7, 8, 10, 11, 12, 15, 16, 17); turntables (4, 5, 6, 8, 10, 12, 14, 15); keyboards (6, 10, 14)
- Zach Hill – drums (3, 4, 5, 7, 9, 11, 13, 15); piano (3); bass drum and xylophone (11)

Guests

- DJ C-Minus – drum programming (1)
- Greg Wells – piano (2)
- Dan Elkan – guitar (3)
- Sonny Mayugba – guitar (5)
- Rob Crow – vocals (4, 7, 9, 15)
- Mary Timony – vocals (8, 12, 16)
- Mike Patton – vocals, synthesizers, and sampler (17)

Technical personnel

- John Baccigaluppi – additional engineering, production and mixing management
- CrookOne – engineer and mixing (6, 10, 14)
- Mike Fraser – engineer (5, 13)
- Ryan Hadlock – engineer (8, 12)
- Pete Roberts – engineer (5)
- Brian Scheuble – engineer (4, 7, 9, 11, 15)
- Howie Weinberg – mastering
- Greg Wells – mixing (1, 2, 5, 7, 9, 13, 15)
- A.J. Wilhelm – mixing (6, 10, 14), additional engineering
- Todd Wilkinson – engineer (3, 6, 10, 14)
- Chris Woodhouse – mixing (3, 4, 8, 11, 12), engineer (1), additional engineering
- Brad Zefferen – engineer (8, 12)
- Joe Zook – engineer (2)

== Release history ==
Region	Date	Label
Europe	May 9, 2005	Maverick
United States	May 10, 2005	Maverick

== Charts ==
Chart performance for Team Sleep
Chart (2005–2024)	Peak position
Australian Albums (ARIA)	69
French Albums (SNEP)	160
Hungarian Physical Albums (MAHASZ)	9
UK Albums (OCC)	91
US Billboard 200	52
