= Tripper (Hella album) =

Studio album by Hella
- Released: August 30, 2011
- Genre: Math rock
- Length: 39:32
- Label: Sargent House

Hella chronology
There's No 666 in Outer Space (2007)	Tripper (2011)	Santa's Little Hella (2013)

Tripper is the fifth studio album by American math rock band Hella (drummer Zach Hill and guitarist Spencer Seim), released on August 30, 2011, by Sargent House on CD and vinyl. The album was released after Hill formed Death Grips with MC Ride and frequent collaborator Andy Morin (and released Exmilitary).

== Reception ==
Professional ratings
Aggregate scores
Source	Rating
Metacritic	72/100
Review scores
Source	Rating
AbsolutePunk	86/100
AllMusic	3.5/5 stars
The A.V. Club	A-
Consequence of Sound	C-
Magnet	8.0/10
Pitchfork	6.0/10
Slant Magazine	2.5/5

Tripper received moderately positive reviews upon release. On review aggregator Metacritic, Tripper holds a 72/100, indicating "generally favorable" reviews.

Pitchfork's Aaron Leitko gave Tripper a 6.0/10, saying that "On Tripper, Hella's instrumental chops are better than ever, but riffs aside, there's not much to think about." Slant magazine was critical of Tripper, commenting that "there's a certain threshold for this kind of demanding material before it gets tiring. It's one that Tripper, staunchly dominated by an old-school style of wanky craftsmanship, crosses pretty quickly." Other reviewers were more positive, with Magnet magazine stating that "[Tripper] is the most blistering set the duo have put out in a long time" and AbsolutePunk stating that "Tripper sounds like Hill and Seim naturally hashed some tunes out--just with some better years of experience behind them to reflect back on." AllMusic's review reads "[Tripper] gives them a kind of spastic, jagged sound that puts them somewhere between Lightning Bolt and an actual bolt of lightning, and makes Tripper an album that's more likely to wear listeners out physically than mentally."

== Track listing ==
No.	Title	Length
1.	"Headless"	4:35
2.	"Self Checkout"	3:11
3.	"Long Hair"	3:13
4.	"Yubacore"	3:45
5.	"Netgear"	5:36
6.	"Kid Life Crisis"	4:16
7.	"On the Record"	2:17
8.	"Furthest"	3:43
9.	"Psycho Bro"	4:08
10.	"Osaka"	4:48
Total length:		39:32
