= Alela Diane =

American singer-songwriter (born 1983)

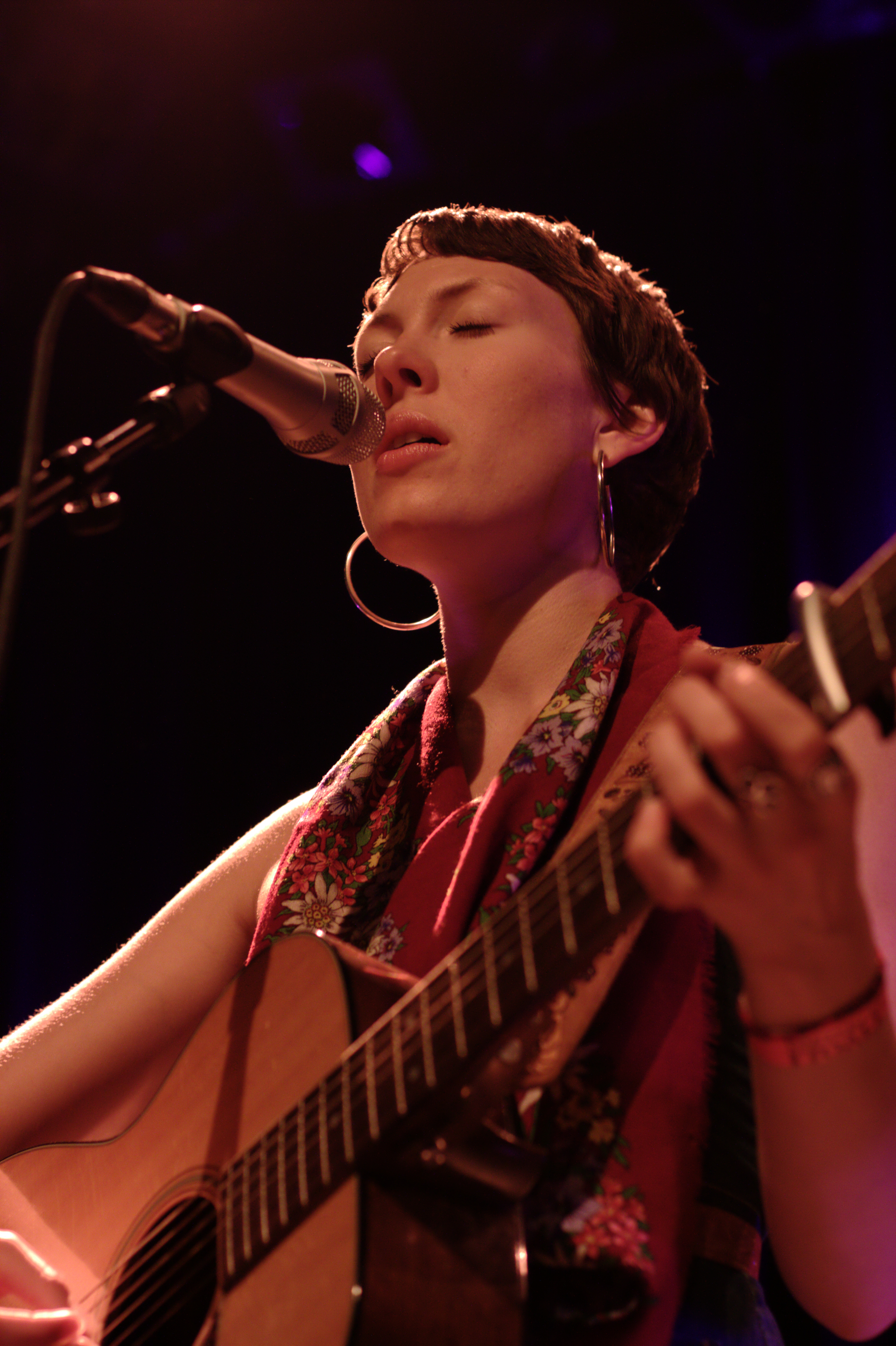
- Diane in 2009

Background information
- Born: Alela Diane Menig; April 20, 1983 (age 43); Nevada City, California, U.S.
- Genres: Indie folk; Americana; psychedelic folk
- Occupations: Singer; songwriter
- Instruments: Vocals; guitar
- Years active: 2003–present
- Labels: Holocene Music; Names Records; Rough Trade Records; Rusted Blue Records
- Website: aleladiane.com

Alela Diane Menig (born April 20, 1983), known as Alela Diane, is an American singer-songwriter from Nevada City, California.

== Early life and education ==
Diane was born in Nevada City, California on April 20, 1983. She grew up singing with her musician parents and performing in the school choir. She taught herself guitar, began writing songs and her first recordings was released in 2003 as Forest Parade. Diane was invited by Joanna Newsom, also from Nevada City, to make her first solo public appearances and later played with the Nevada City band Black Bear before continuing her solo career.

== Career ==
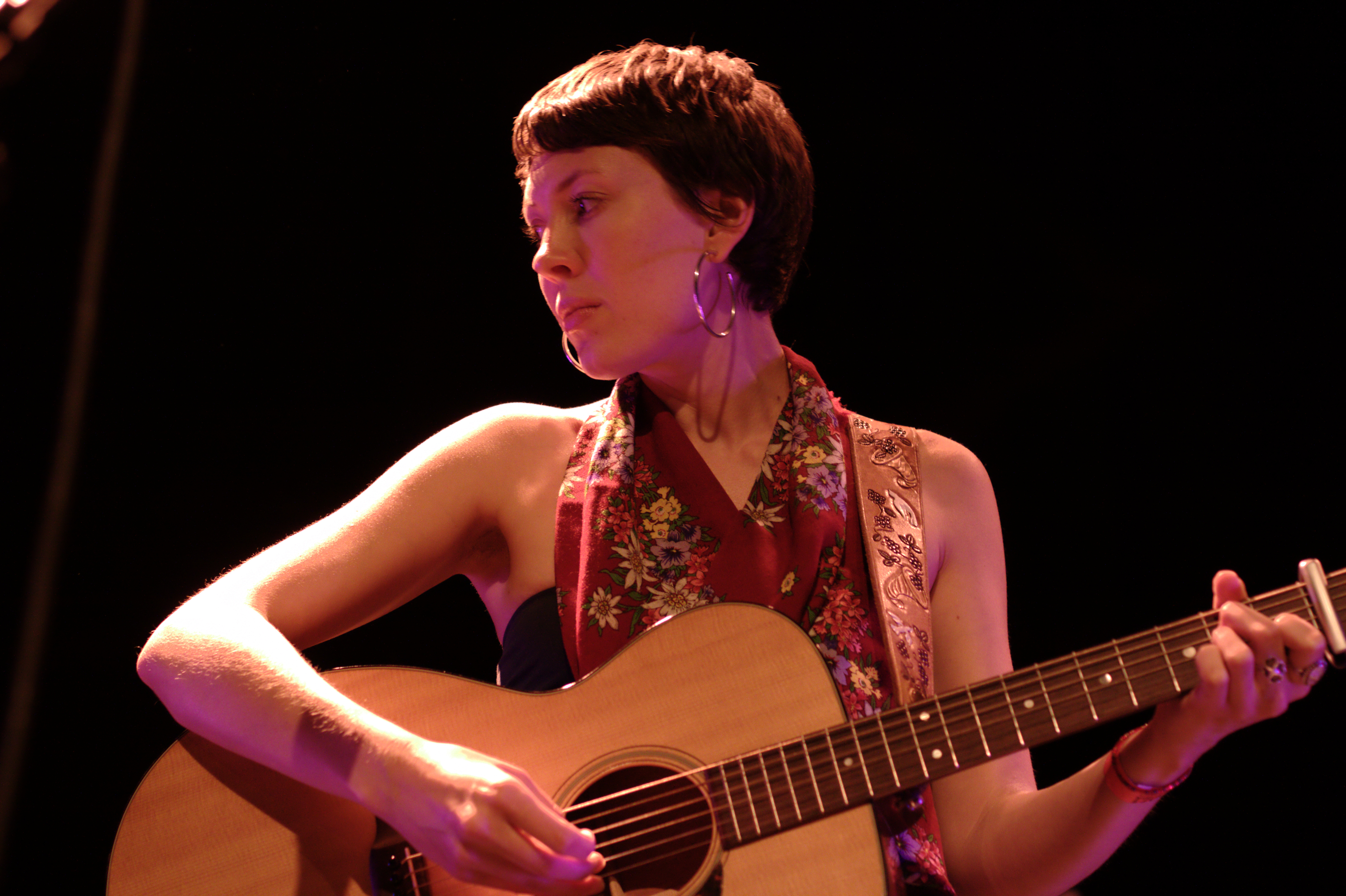
Diane in Tivoli De Helling, 2009

The songs for her album The Pirate's Gospel were written on a trip to Europe. They were recorded in her father’s studio and were initially self-released in 2004, in paper and lace sleeves with hand lettering. The album was issued in revised form by Holocene Music in October 2006, and received widespread critical acclaim.

A new song, "Dry Grass and Shadows", was issued on a compilation of Nevada City artists, and five more new songs were issued on a limited-edition 10" vinyl pressing, Songs Whistled Through White Teeth, released in the United Kingdom in October 2006. The Pirate's Gospel was released in the UK on Names Records in April 2007, garnering favorable reviews in The Times and NME.

She toured the U.S. both solo and with Tom Brosseau, and opened for Iron & Wine, Akron/Family, the Decemberists and Vashti Bunyan. She also toured extensively in Europe (UK, Ireland, France, Switzerland, Netherlands, Belgium, Germany) in the spring of 2008.

She sang on an album of cover songs, The Silence of Love, released in November 2008, recorded by Eddie Bezalel and Hugo Nicholson with musicians Josh Klinghoffer, Joey Waronker, Gus Seyffert, Leo Abrahams and Woody Jackson under the name Headless Heroes.

Her second album, To Be Still, was released in February 2009 on Rough Trade Records. In early 2009, she toured the US opening for Blitzen Trapper, and spent the better part of that year touring Europe.

Her third album, Alela Diane & Wild Divine, was released in April 2011, and was recorded with a backing band, Wild Divine, which included her father, Tom Menig, and her then-husband, Tom Bevitori. She and Wild Divine toured the US and Europe to promote the album, and in July 2011, they opened for the Fleet Foxes on a string of dates. In the fall of the same year, she also accompanied Fleet Foxes as their opening act in Europe.

In 2012, her song "Take Us Back" was featured on the end credits of the "No Time Left", the fifth and final episode of the adventure game The Walking Dead by Telltale Games. In 2019, the song was once again used near the end of The Walking Dead: The Final Season episode "Take us Back".

Her fourth album, About Farewell, was released on her own label, Rusted Blue Records, in digital format in June 2013, with the physical edition issued in July.

In 2014, the track "The Light" appeared on The Walking Dead fourth season soundtrack, Songs of Survival Vol. 2.

On October 16, 2015, Diane and guitarist Ryan Francesconi released the album Cold Moon, featuring the "thoughtful guitar picking of Francesconi [and] Diane’s naturalist, poetic lyrics".

Preceded by the single "Émigré", her fifth album, Cusp, was released on February 9, 2018.

== Personal life ==
Diane married Tom Bevitori in 2011. They divorced and she married Toren Volkmann in August 2013. They have two daughters, Vera Marie (born October 2013) and Oona (born February 2017).

== Discography ==
=== Studio albums ===
Title	Album details
Forest Parade	Released: 2003; Label: self-released; Format: CD
The Pirate's Gospel	Released: 2004; Reissued: 2006 (US), 2007 (UK), revised track listing; Remastered deluxe edition: 2018; Label: self-released (2004), Holocene Music (US, 2006), Names Records (UK, 2007), AllPoints (2018); Format: CD, vinyl, digital download
To Be Still	Released: 2009; Label: Rough Trade Records; Format: CD, digital download
Alela Diane & Wild Divine with Wild Divine	Released: 2011; Charts: UK No. 158; Label: Rough Trade Records; Format: CD, digital download
About Farewell	Released: 2013; Label: Rusted Blue Records; Format: CD, digital download
Cold Moon with Ryan Francesconi	Released: 2015; Label: Believe Recordings; Format: CD, digital download
Cusp	Released: 2018; Label: AllPoints; Format: CD, vinyl, digital download
Looking Glass	Released: 2022; Label: Believe Recordings/Naive; Format: CD, digital download
Who's Keeping Time?	Released: 2026; Label: Fluff and Gravy Records (US), Loose Music; Format: CD, vinyl, digital download

=== Singles and EPs ===
- Alela Diane CD EP (2005, self-released)
- Songs Whistled Through White Teeth 10" vinyl EP (2006, Names Records)
- "The Rifle" CD single (2008, Names Records)
- "To Be Still" CD single (2008, Names Records)
- Alela & Alina featuring Alina Hardin 10" vinyl EP (2009, Family/Names Records)
- "Elijah" CD single (2011, Rough Trade Records)
- Home Recordings & B-Sides from the Wild Divine Sessions CD EP (2011, Rough Trade Records)

=== With Headless Heroes ===
- The Silence of Love (2008, Names Records)
- "The North Wind Blew South" 7"/CD single (2008, Names Records)
- Headless Heroes 12" EP (2009, Names Records)

=== Compilation appearances ===
- "Church of Jesus Christ" on Dream Magazine #6 (2006)
- "Dry Grass and Shadows (Live in Studio)" on Grass Roots Record Co. Family Album (2006, Grass Roots Records)
- "There's Only One" on Be Yourself: A Tribute to Graham Nash's Songs for Beginners (2010, Grass Roots Records)
- "Like a Summer Thursday" on More Townes Van Zandt by the Great Unknown (2010, Forthesakeofthesong)
- "How Can We Hang on to a Dream" on Reason To Believe - The Songs of Tim Hardin (2013, Full Time Hobby)
- "The Light" on The Walking Dead: Songs of Survival Vol. 2 (2014, Republic Records)
- "Lady Divine" on Late Night Tales: Jon Hopkins (2015, Night Time Stories Ltd.)

=== Other appearances ===
- "Take Us Back" in The Walking Dead: The Final Season - Episode 4 video game (2019, Telltale Games/Skybound Games)
- "I Never Came" on Uncovered: Queens of the Stone Age (2013, Music For Music Lovers)
