= Triclops! =

American acid punk/progressive rock band

- Origin: San Francisco, California; United States
- Genres: Punk rock, progressive rock, acid rock, post-hardcore
- Years active: 2005–2010
- Labels: Gold Standard Laboratories; Alternative Tentacles; Sick Room Records; Missing Finger Records
- Members: Christian Eric Beaulieu; Larry Boothroyd; John Geek; Phil Becker
- Website: triclopsband.com

Triclops! was an American, San Francisco and Oakland-based acid punk/progressive rock band, formed in 2005. They released two full-length albums, a 7" picture disc single, and an EP on noted independent record labels Gold Standard Laboratories, Alternative Tentacles, and Sick Room Records. Triclops! includes members of noted bay area bands Victim's Family, Fleshies, Bottles and Skulls, and Lower Forty-Eight. The band went on hiatus in 2010 following the release of their second full-length Helpers On The Other Side, with the members remaining busy in their older bands and new projects. Triclops! guitarist Christian Eric Beaulieu's current project is as the primary songwriter for Los Angeles-based band Anywhere, which also features progressive punk luminaries Mike Watt and Cedric Bixler-Zavala. Phil Becker drums for Pins of Light, while singer John Geek (aka John No) plays bass and sings in Street Eaters and bassist Larry Boothroyd is a member of Jello Biafra and the Guantanamo School of Medicine.

Triclops! albums are composed of lengthy, epic songs with often-spastic structures. Complex, aggressive guitar lines and a driving rhythm section competed for space with strongly melodic vocals, which were frequently obscured beneath a bevy of vocal effects; this sonic juxtaposition earned strong critical reactions, both positive and negative, for the band's releases. Noted for its powerful live show, in which singer John Geek frequently ventured into the audience, Triclops! extensively toured the United States and Europe. The band's last publicized performance date was in April, 2010.

== Discography ==
=== Studio albums ===
- Out Of Africa (Alternative Tentacles, March 2008)
- Helpers On The Other Side (Alternative Tentacles, 2010)

=== Singles and EPs ===
- Cafeteria Brutalia EP (12" Picture disc on Missing Finger Records / CD on Sick Room Records, February 2007)
- Too Many Humans (7" Picture disc on Gold Standard Laboratories, August 2007, the last release on that label)

== See also ==
- Alternative Tentacles
- Gold Standard Laboratories
- Sick Room Records
