= Hella (band) =

American math rock band

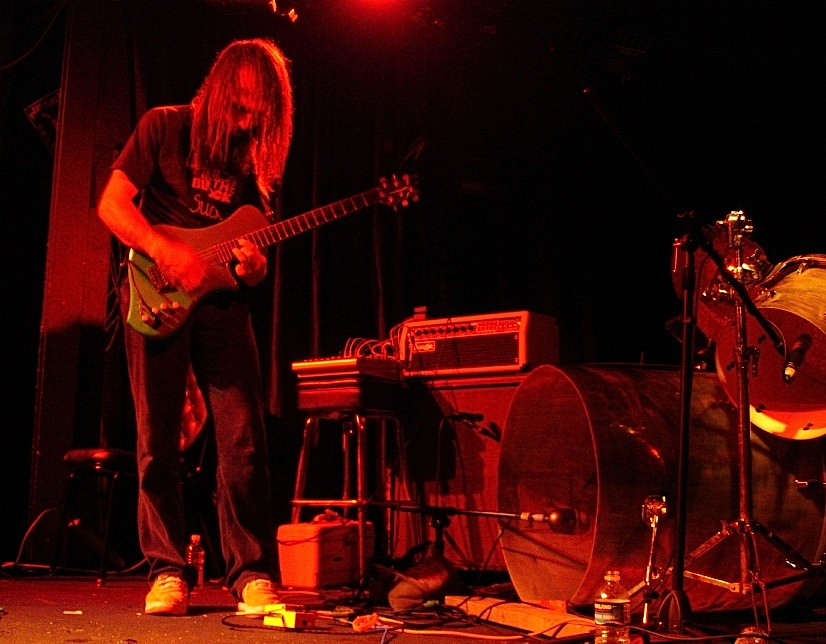
- Spencer Seim live at The Echo, June 22, 2006

Background information
- Origin: Sacramento, California, U.S.
- Genres: Math rock; noise rock; experimental rock; instrumental rock
- Years active: 2001–2011
- Labels: 5 Rue Christine; Suicide Squeeze; Ipecac; Sargent House
- Members: Spencer Seim; Zach Hill
- Past members: Dan Elkan; Josh Hill; Jonathan Hischke; Carson McWhirter; Aaron Ross
- Website: hella.bandcamp.com

Hella (stylized: HeLLa) was an American math rock band from Sacramento, California. The primary members of the band are Spencer Seim on electric guitar and Zach Hill on drums. The band expanded their live band by adding Dan Elkan on vocals, rhythm guitar, sampler and synthesizer and Jonathan Hischke on synth bass guitar for their 2005 tour. In 2006 they reformed as a five-piece line-up including Seim, Hill, Carson McWhirter (of The Advantage), Aaron Ross & Josh Hill. In 2009, the band was reduced back to core members Hill and Seim.

AllMusic called Hella "one of the most prolific acts on the American noise-rock scene".

== History ==
=== Formation and early years ===
As teenagers Spencer Seim and Zach Hill were both members of the Northern California band Legs on Earth along with Josh Hill on guitar and Julian Imsdahl on bass and vocals. The band achieved some moderate local success, becoming renowned for their wild live shows, young age, and Primus-esque sound. Zach Hill described Legs on Earth in an interview as pop music but in the way Devo and Talking Heads were considered pop. They released one album in 1999 called Lasers & Saviors on local record label Para-Sight Records, now out of print. In April 2000 they went on hiatus and later broke up. Imsdahl was later in the band Grandstream (formerly known as Little California), and was previously in the band Eraserhead, while Josh Hill went on to be in the band Playing to the Grandstand. Hill and Seim decided they wanted to continue playing together and pursue a less mainstream sound. According to Hill, they didn't always intend to remain a duo, though: "[We] had intentions to start a band that was like… kinda like what we were doing with just the two of us, but with more people. But, we couldn't find the other people so we decided to do it just with the two of us." Their name is simply a reference to the slang word "hella" that was common throughout Northern California.

Hella's earliest recording was the self-released Leather Diamond EP, hand-assembled in a nondescript cardboard sleeve and sold at some of their first shows.

On March 19, 2002, they debuted proper with the full-length Hold Your Horse Is LP on 5 Rue Christine (a subsidiary of Olympia, Washington-based Kill Rock Stars). The Falam Dynasty 7-inch was also released that year.

=== 2003–present ===
After the release of Hold Your Horse Is, 2003 saw Hella begin to deviate from the basic framework in the studio, although their live sound remained largely unchanged. Released on June 17 of that year, Hella's Bitches Ain't Shit But Good People EP (originally a vinyl only release) featured many firsts for the band. An earlier recorded (Leather Diamond) version of a song from their first LP, "Republic of Rough And Ready", became their first widely released song to feature vocals (provided by friend of the band Dan Elkan). A version of "1-800-Ghost-Dance" with vocals by Elkan was available as a downloadable mp3 on the band's website in late 2002. The Bitches EP also found Hella using bass guitar, synthesizer, and drum machine for the first time. Total Bugs Bunny on Wild Bass, also an EP, was released on August 26 and featured the use of synth, sampler, and drum machine and an apparent influence from 8-bit video game music, first hinted at on the opening track of Hold Your Horse Is, "The D. Elkan". Hella rounded out the year with a split live double CD with San Francisco, California-based band Dilute.

Hella released their second full-length LP in 2004, The Devil Isn't Red. Other releases for the year included a split 7-inch (with Four Tet) and a limited edition, Japan-only release of the three-song Acoustics EP.

For their 2005 release, Hella again experimented with their sound in the studio. Church Gone Wild/Chirpin Hard, released through Suicide Squeeze Records, is a double-solo album, with Zach Hill and Seim each recording a whole disc's worth of material independent of each other. Hill's disc, Church Gone Wild, is a 56-minute noise piece which featured Zach doing all the vocals and instruments, save for a few guest appearances; while Seim's disc, Chirpin Hard, again experiments with the fusion of 8-bit Nintendo music with punk and math rock. Hella also expanded their live band to a quartet in 2005, adding Dan Elkan on vocals, rhythm guitar, and synthesizer, and Jonathan Hischke on bass guitar in order to play songs from Total Bugs Bunny on Wild Bass and Church Gone Wild/Chirpin Hard live, in most cases for the first time. This line-up toured the US in support of Out Hud in Spring, System of a Down, The Mars Volta, Les Claypool, and Dillinger Escape Plan in the fall as well as numerous headlining dates in the U.S. as well as visits to Japan, Spain and the UK. The show from October 8 at Arco & Oakland Arenas was documented by R.T. Thomas and self-released in July 2007 on DVD.

A DVD/CD EP release titled Concentration Face/Homeboy was released on November 8, 2005, on 5RC Records. The DVD features almost 3 hours of footage from their 2004 Japan tour, mostly consisting of performances from the first two albums.

In 2006, Hella consisted of Spencer Seim, Zach Hill, Hill's cousin Josh (who also played in Legs on Earth), Seim's Advantage bandmate Carson McWhirter, and Aaron Ross. The first release from this line-up, entitled There's No 666 in Outer Space, was released on January 30, 2007, on Ipecac Recordings. This album was released in 2008 as a double 180g vinyl on Black Diamond Records with new artwork by Mayka Finkelstein-Amrami.

As of August 2008, In an interview with Exclaim Magazine regarding his solo effort, Zach stated that "Hella is a real grey area in general right now". The future of the band seemed to be up in the air.

On Thursday, March 12, 2009, a blog post on Hella's MySpace page revealed that Hella once again consisted of only core members Hill and Seim, and that the band was working on writing and recording a new album, due to be finished later that year. It also revealed that an international tour may have been in the works.

On September 4, 2010, Hella announced they had eight tracks ready for their new album.

As of 2011, Hella is signed to Sargent House, who released their most recent album, Tripper, on August 30, 2011.

On March 19, 2022, in celebration of the 20th anniversary of “Hold Your Horse Is,” the band announced the album's vinyl reissue in 2022 along with the release of never-before seen or heard Hella media.

On October 31, 2022, videos of Hill and Seim performing "Headless" and "Self Checkout" from the album Tripper appeared on Zach Hill's official instagram account.

On July 24, 2023, the deluxe reissue of "Hold Your Horse Is" was revealed, sporting different variations of colored vinyl, and a bonus 7". Pitchfork gave the album an 8.3 as "Best New Reissue", more than 21 years after the original release of the album.

A 20th anniversary remastered edition of Hella's second album "The Devil Isn't Red" was released by Kill Rock Stars on September 27th, 2024 on vinyl and compact disc.

== Side projects ==
In addition to their work in Hella, Seim and Zach Hill have also recorded with a number of side projects.

Seim plays drums in NES theme music cover band The Advantage (a reference to the NES Advantage controller), notable for using only guitar, bass guitar, and drums to replicate the 8-bit programmed music of the games. The genre has been called Nintendocore and The Advantage are credited with pioneering it. Seim has also released a solo album under the moniker sBACH. Recently Seim, playing drums, has formed Solos with guitarist and vocalist Aaron Ross (formerly of Hella). Their debut album "Beast of Both Worlds" was released on Sept 11 2012 on Joyful Noise records.

Hill has recorded albums with Marnie Stern, Tough Guy Fantasy/Arctic Boys, Flössin, Crime in Choir, Nervous Cop (with drummer Greg Saunier of Deerhoof and harpist Joanna Newsom), Damsel (with guitarist Nels Cline), Friend/Enemy (with Tim Kinsella, Sam Zurick, Todd Mattei, Jim Becker, Graeme Gibson, Caryn Culp, Emma Grace Lansangan, Nick Marci, Chris Powell, Azita Youssefi), Zach Hill and the Holy Smokes (whose first release was accompanied by a 138-page book written and illustrated by Hill), as well as playing drums for Chino Moreno's band Team Sleep, The Ladies, Kenseth Thibideau and Marty Anderson's band Howard Hello and Jeordie White and Chris Goss's band Goon Moon. More recently, Hill has teamed up with Mick Barr from Octis and Orthrelm and together have released the LPs Shred Earthship on 5 Rue Christine and Volume 2 on the Austrian label Rock Is Hell. Volume 2 consists of the two longest tracks from the Shred Earthship sessions. Hill's best known project outside of Hella now is perhaps experimental hip hop outfit Death Grips, who have gone on to achieve a cult following in their own right and widespread critical acclaim.

Both Hill and Hischke are members of El Grupo Nuevo de Omar Rodriguez-Lopez with Juan Alderete, Cedric Bixler-Zavala and Omar Rodríguez-López, the first of three records produced by the group is Cryptomnesia, which was released on May 5, 2009.

In 2008, Hischke formed the band Dot Hacker along with Josh Klinghoffer.

== Style ==
Hella's sound is characterized by the band's "chaotic approach to instrumental noise rock".

== Members ==
=== Current ===
- Zach Hill – drums, vocals, guitar, sampler, bass, keyboards, synthesizer (2001–present)
- Spencer Seim – guitar, sampler, programming, bass, keyboards, synthesizer, backing vocals, drum machine (2001–present)

=== Former ===
- Carson McWhirter – bass, keyboards (2006-2009)
- Josh Hill – guitar, backing vocals (2006-2009)
- Aaron Ross – vocals (2006-2009)

=== Touring members ===
- Dan Elkan – vocals, rhythm guitar, synthesizer (2005-2006)
- Jonathan Hischke – bass (2005-2006)

== Discography ==
=== Albums ===
- Hold Your Horse Is (2002), 5 Rue Christine
- The Devil Isn't Red (2004), 5 Rue Christine
- Church Gone Wild/Chirpin' Hard (2005), Suicide Squeeze
- There's No 666 in Outer Space (2007), Ipecac Recordings
- Tripper (2011), Sargent House

=== EPs ===
- Leather Diamond (2001)
- Bitches Ain't Shit but Good People (2003), Suicide Squeeze
- Total Bugs Bunny on Wild Bass (2003), Narnack Records
- Concentration Face/Homeboy (2005), 5 Rue Christine
- Acoustics (2006), Toad Records/5 Rue Christine
- Santa's Little Hella (2013), Joyful Noise

=== Singles ===
- "Falam Dynasty" (2002), 5 Rue Christine

=== Split releases ===
- live split with Dilute (2003) Sick Room Records, LTD
- split with Four Tet (2004), Ache Records
