= To Be Still =

Studio album by Alela Diane
- Released: February 17, 2009
- Recorded: 2008
- Genres: Indie folk, psychedelic folk, Americana
- Length: 47:02
- Label: Rough Trade Records

Alela Diane chronology
The Pirate's Gospel (2004)	To Be Still (2009)	Alela Diane & Wild Divine (2011)

Professional ratings
Review scores
Source	Rating
The Guardian	4/5 stars
Mojo	4/5 stars
musicOMH	4.5/5 stars
NME	(6/10)
NOW	5/5 stars
The Observer	4/5 stars
Paste	(92/100)
Pitchfork	(8.0/10)
PopMatters	(7/10)
Q Magazine	2/5 stars
Spin	3.5/5 stars
Uncut	4/5 stars

To Be Still is the second studio album by indie folk musician Alela Diane, released February 17, 2009 on Rough Trade Records.

== Track listing ==
All tracks are written by Alela Diane Menig.

No.	Title	Length
1.	"Dry Grass & Shadows"	3:12
2.	"White as Diamonds"	3:36
3.	"Age Old Blue"	4:00
4.	"To Be Still"	5:27
5.	"Take Us Back"	4:43
6.	"The Alder Trees"	3:28
7.	"My Brambles"	4:59
8.	"The Ocean"	3:43
9.	"Every Path"	4:12
10.	"Tatted Lace"	4:47
11.	"Lady Divine"	5:12
