= HMS Advantage =

Three ships of the Royal Navy have borne the name HMS Advantage:

- HMS Advantage (1590) was an 18-gun ship built in 1590 and burnt in 1613.
- HMS Advantage (1652) was a 26-gun ship captured from the Dutch in 1652 and sold in 1655.
- HMS Advantage (W133) was a rescue tug of the Favourite class commissioned in 1943 under Lend-Lease and returned to the United States Navy in 1946.

== See also ==
- HMS Advantagia
