= Instrumental Quarter =

- Origin: Italy
- Genres: Post-rock
- Labels: Sick Room

Instrumental Quarter is an Italian instrumental post-rock band, formed in 1999 in Cuneo.

== Band members ==
Paride Lanciani - guitar - (Founder: 1999 - today)
Tommaso Fia - keyboards (2016 - today)
Nicolas Joseph Roncea - bass (2016 - 2018)
Simone Rossi - drums (2016 - 2018)

Former
Luigi Racca - bass (1999 - 2002)
Marco Allocco - cello (1999 - 2002)
Flavio Cravero - drums (1999 - 2002)
Luca Bleu - drums and percussions (2002 - 2006)
Gabriele Fioritti - cello (2002 - 2006)
Francesco Calabrese - videoart (2002 - 2006)
Gabriele Grosso - bass (2002 - 2009)
Davide Arneodo - piano, violin (2004 - 2009)
Marco Bognanni - drums (2004 - 2009)

== Discography ==
- No More Secrets (2003), Sick Room
- Traffic Jam (2006), Sick Room
- Free (2007), Stiff Slack
