= Sweep the Leg Johnny =

American rock band

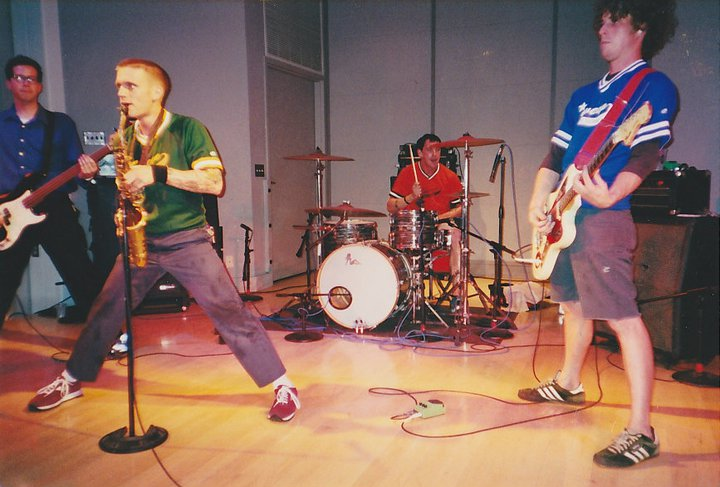
- STLJ live in Champaign-Urbana in the early 2000s

Background information
- Origin: Chicago, Illinois, U.S.
- Genres: Indie rock; math rock; noise rock; post-hardcore; post-rock; art punk
- Years active: 1996–2002, 2005
- Labels: Divot; Southern
- Spinoff of: Check Engine
- Past members: Steve Sostak; Chris Daly; Scott Anna; Matt Alicea; John Brady; Mitch Cheney

Sweep the Leg Johnny was an American indie rock band which formed in 1996 and disbanded in 2002. They combined elements of a number of styles and genres into a sound that was not easily categorized.

== History ==
Alto saxophonist and vocalist Steve Sostak and guitarist Chris Daly met while attending the University of Notre Dame, where they played together in Check Engine between 1993 and 1994. The two relocated to Chicago after graduating, where they recruited drummer Scott Anna and bass guitarist Matt Alicea, forming Sweep the Leg Johnny; the name was a reference to a line in the film The Karate Kid. Their first releases were a split single with Streganona and the "New Buffalo" single, released on Divot Records.

In 1997, the band released 4.9.21.30 on Divot Records. Following this, Matt Alicea left and was replaced by John Brady, formerly of Spanakorzo and Swing Kids. The band then signed to Southern Records for their second album Tomorrow We Will Run Faster, released in 1999. Tomorrow... was mastered at Abbey Road Studios in London. Stosak and Daly re-formed Check Engine in 2000 but returned to Sweep the Leg Johnny with their third album Sto Cazzo! (the title an obscenity in Italian) which followed later that year. The band again went on hiatus as Stosak and Daly concentrated on Check Engine.

Guitarist Mitch Cheney of Rumah Sakit joined the band in 2001, appearing on their final album Going Down Swingin', released in 2002. The album featured re-recordings of older songs as well as new material. The debut Check Engine album, meanwhile, was released in January 2002. The band played over 725 shows during their original time together.

After the band split up, Steve Sostak and John Brady also played in the band ZZZZ, which released one album in 2005, Palm Reader. Chris Daly joined a group with members of June of 44 and Hoover called Just A Fire, and currently plays in Haymarket Riot. Mitch Cheney is in a project called GREENESS. Sweep the Leg Johnny also reformed for a benefit gig in Chicago near the end of 2005. Sostak subsequently relocated to Peru where he worked as a teacher.

Vocalist Steve Sostak died in February 2023, at the age of 49.

== Musical style ==
Allmusic described Sweep the Leg Johnny's style as a combination of "dissonant rock, progressive music, jazz, noise and punk", while the Chicago Tribune described the band as "art-punk", stating that the band "combines the complexity of art rock, the sledgehammer forcefulness of punk, brooding melodies and countless hours of toil into one of the city's most distinctive sounds", describing their music as "a roller-coaster ride of jarring guitar riffs and blaring free jazz saxophone, abruptly changing time signatures and dramatic, dynamic shifts". The Stranger described them as "the only band in America that can make a saxophone sound like it belongs in the middle of intimidating post-punk guitars and apocalyptic vocals". The Riverfront Times described the band's music as "a jazz-laden style of indie rock that featured plenty of mathy twists and turns". Reviewing Tomorrow We Will Run Faster, Allmusic writer Rick Anderson viewed their music as falling "somewhere between the dry, academic precision of 1980s King Crimson and the sprawling art-punk clamor of Mission of Burma".

Dallas Observer writer Zac Crain summed up the difficulty in categorizing the band: "In fact, there is no way to properly describe Sweep the Leg Johnny without completely missing the point, without chiseling away at the Chicago-based band until it neatly fits into a category that is comfortable and familiar. And wrong."

== Discography ==
=== Albums ===
- 4.9.21.30 (1997), Divot
- Tomorrow We Will Run Faster (1999), Southern
- Sto Cazzo! (2000), Southern
- Live September 9, 2000 (2000), Sickroom - live album split with Rumah Sakit
- Going Down Swingin' (2002), Southern

=== Singles ===
- "Similarities" (1995), The Estate - split 7-inch with Streganona
- "New Buffalo" (1996), Divot - b/w "Insomnia Pays"/"In the Shade of the House"
- "Mental Vehn Diagram" (1998), Choke/Divot - split 7-inch with Cowpers
- "Walking Home On The Emergency Bed" (1998), Tree - split 7-inch with A Minor Forest
- "Synchronicity I" (2002), Makoto Recordings - split 7-inch with Haymarket Riot
- "Transit Must Suffer" on Quarters vol. 2 (2002) - 7-inch EP also featuring Biddy Biddy Biddy, Casket Lottery, and Trocar
