= The Goonies II =

1987 video game

- North American box art
- Developer: Konami
- Publisher: Konami
- Director: Hitoshi Akamatsu
- Designer: Yoshiaki Yamada
- Programmers: Hitoshi Akamatsu; Yoshiaki Yamada
- Artists: Mari Kinoshita; Kenji Shimoide
- Composers: Hidenori Maezawa; Satoe Terashima
- Series: The Goonies
- Platform: Nintendo Entertainment System
- Release: JP: March 18, 1987; NA: November 1987; PAL: December 19, 1988
- Genres: Action-adventure, platform
- Mode: Single-player

The Goonies II (Japanese: グーニーズ2 フラッテリー最後の挑戦, Hepburn: Gūnīzu Tsū: Furatterī Saigo no Chōsen; The Goonies II: The Fratellis' Last Stand) is a 1987 action-adventure game developed and published by Konami for the Nintendo Entertainment System. It is a sequel to a prior Goonies video game released on the Family Computer in Japan, which was only available in North America on Nintendo VS. System arcade units.

== Plot ==
The Fratelli family have escaped from prison. Along with Jake and Francis Fratelli's cousin Pipsqueak, Ma Fratelli leads her family into capturing most of the Goonies and a mermaid named Annie. Mikey works to avoid getting caught by the Fratellis in order to free the Goonies and Annie.

Once Annie is freed and has swam out into the ocean, a final cutscene occurs where a news reporter covers the arrests of the Fratellis.

== Gameplay ==
The Goonies II is considered an early example of an exploration platform game, with open level design similar to Pitfall II: Lost Caverns and Castlevania II: Simon's Quest. The game features two modes of play: platform and first-person. Most of the game is played as the former as the player works through a non-linear map. The player moves Mikey to new areas of the map by ladders or doors that may act as warp zones. Several different types of zones are found in the game, each with distinct enemies, graphics and music. The Fratelli family (Jake, Francis, Cousin Pipsqueak, and Ma Fratelli) will frequently appear to pursue Mikey; with the exception of Pipsqueak who vanishes when hit, they can be stunned briefly with attacks but cannot be defeated.

When the player exits the platform screen by entering a door, the game shifts to a first-person mode. Using a command menu similar to Shadowgate (released a few months after The Goonies II), the player explores the area by navigating through rooms, searching for hidden items and interacting with non-player characters. The items the player finds may be useful in the platform screens (such as weapons or transceivers) or within the rooms themselves (such as the candle, key and ladder). The player will find the six Goonies and eventually Annie in cells in this mode. Each rescued Goonie increases Mikey's health, and all six must be rescued before Annie can be freed.

There are a number of weapons the player can use, and the player can equip both a primary and secondary weapon. Mikey can use three primary weapons: the yo-yo, a short-range weapon with limited power; the slingshot, a ranged, ammunition-based weapon; and the boomerang, a slower ranged weapon with unlimited use. The bomb and molotov cocktail are the two secondary weapons the player can use, and the player can increase Mikey's carrying capacity by finding additional cases of them. These are explosive weapons that have a small blast radius and can damage Mikey if he is in range; the bomb can also reveal hidden doors. There are also two performance boosting shoes in the game; the spring shoes increase Mikey's jumping ability and are required to reach certain areas of the map, and the hyper shoes increase Mikey's speed and make some areas more easily accessible. The player must find and use a diving suit in order to reach underwater areas of the hideout; this item limits Mikey to using a harpoon gun and bombs as his weapons.

Various items found throughout the maze allow Mikey to reach different areas of the map include a ladder, a diving suit, and even glasses which can reveal hidden doors.

What the player has to do in order to obtain certain vital items is sometimes obscure. For example, the candle is obtained when Mikey hits a specific old woman five times in a row.

An item called a Magic Locator Device can lead Mikey to a hidden Goonie, represented by a blue dot on the map. Although Mikey can find and locate up to six Magic Locator Devices, when one Goonie is rescued all collected Magic Locator Devices will vanish, but they may be recollected if there are remaining Goonies.

Mikey loses one life whenever his health meter is completely drained or he falls off the bottom edge of the screen. When all lives are lost, the game is over and the player receives a password that can be used to resume play at a later time, retaining all items and progress to that point.

== Development ==
The Goonies II was released on March 18, 1987 in Japan, November in North America, and on December 19, 1988 in Europe.

== Reception ==
Ratings

Review scores
Publication	Score
Computer and Video Games	81%
Famitsu	26/40
GameSpot	7.3/10
GameTrailers	6.2/10

The game received generally positive reviews upon release. Famitsu rated the game 26 out of 40. Computer and Video Games rated the game 81% in 1989.

It is listed as 16th on Gamasutra's list of 20 open world games. There, it is described as considerably less difficult than predecessor The Goonies though it still "basically requires a strategy guide to finish". Gameplay progression is based partially upon implicit clues, such as the strategic absence of things, making a player to think that the occasional discovery is "the most awesome thing in the world".
