= Bomberman II =

1991 video game

- North American box art by Greg Martin
- Developer: Hudson Soft
- Publisher: Hudson Soft
- Designer: Hitoshi Okuno
- Programmer: Yasuhiro Kosaka
- Artist: Mika Sasaki
- Composer: Jun Chikuma
- Series: Bomberman
- Platform: Nintendo Entertainment System
- Release: JP: June 28, 1991; EU: 1992; NA: March 1993
- Genre: Action
- Modes: Single-player, multiplayer

Bomberman II (Note: Japanese: ボンバーマンII, Hepburn: Bonbāman Tsū), released in Europe and Australia as Dynablaster, is an action game developed and published by Hudson Soft for the Nintendo Entertainment System originally in Japan in 1991, Europe in 1992 and later in North America in March 1993.

== Gameplay ==
Area 1-1

Bomberman II is an action and puzzle video game where the player controls the eponymous character. There are three game modes: Normal Mode, Vs. Mode, and Battle Mode. Normal Mode is a single-player campaign, while the other two are multiplayer configurations with competitive gameplay.

In the Normal Mode, the player controls White Bomberman. The campaign begins with Black Bomberman, his evil rival, pulling off a bank heist and framing White Bomberman for it. Condemned for the crime he did not commit, White Bomberman's objective is to break out of jail and pursue Black Bomberman so that he can bring him to justice and set the record straight.

In each level, there are enemies and blocks on the field that obstruct White Bomberman's path. Bomberman's primary weapon is his bombs, which are able to demolish blocks and defeat enemies. When Bomberman drops his bombs in places, they blow up after a few seconds and shoot flames toward four directions in a cross pattern. A bomb explosion can set off another bomb immediately, and Bomberman can place multiple bombs for chain reaction. The player's goal is to eliminate all enemies in the level and find the randomly generated exit hidden under blocks.

At the beginning of the game, Bomberman starts off being able to place only one bomb at a time, but he can upgrade his abilities by collecting power-up panels. The panels give Bomberman beneficial perks like dropping more bombs, increased bomb strength, running faster, becoming blast proof, passing through walls, and controlling detonation. Certain items also add bonus points to the score. The power-up panels are hidden under blocks, usually one per level.

The Normal Mode consists of six levels, with each broken into eight smaller areas, for a total of 48 stages. As White Bomberman makes progress, more advanced foes appear in the levels. Enemies have various behaviors like wandering in set patterns, passing through blocks, disappearing and reappearing, or transforming into a bomb. If a bomb blast strikes the exit, several enemies will spawn from it. The player can access bonus levels between the regular levels if a hidden Bomberman token is collected. Lives can be earned by making contact with a White Bomberman clone in the bonus levels.

When Bomberman is attacked by enemies, is caught in an explosion, or fails to clear a level under a time limit, he is killed and the player loses a life. The player can save and continue the progress with an eight-character password. A special password lets the player access the sound test.

The Vs. Mode and Battle Mode both have the human players compete against one another in an arena. The players must eliminate their opponents and win a set number of games in order to win the match. The Vs. Mode supports two players while the Battle Mode supports three. There is no option for computer opponents. The Battle Mode spawns a Skull panel that gives negative side effects to the Bomberman characters.

== Development and release ==
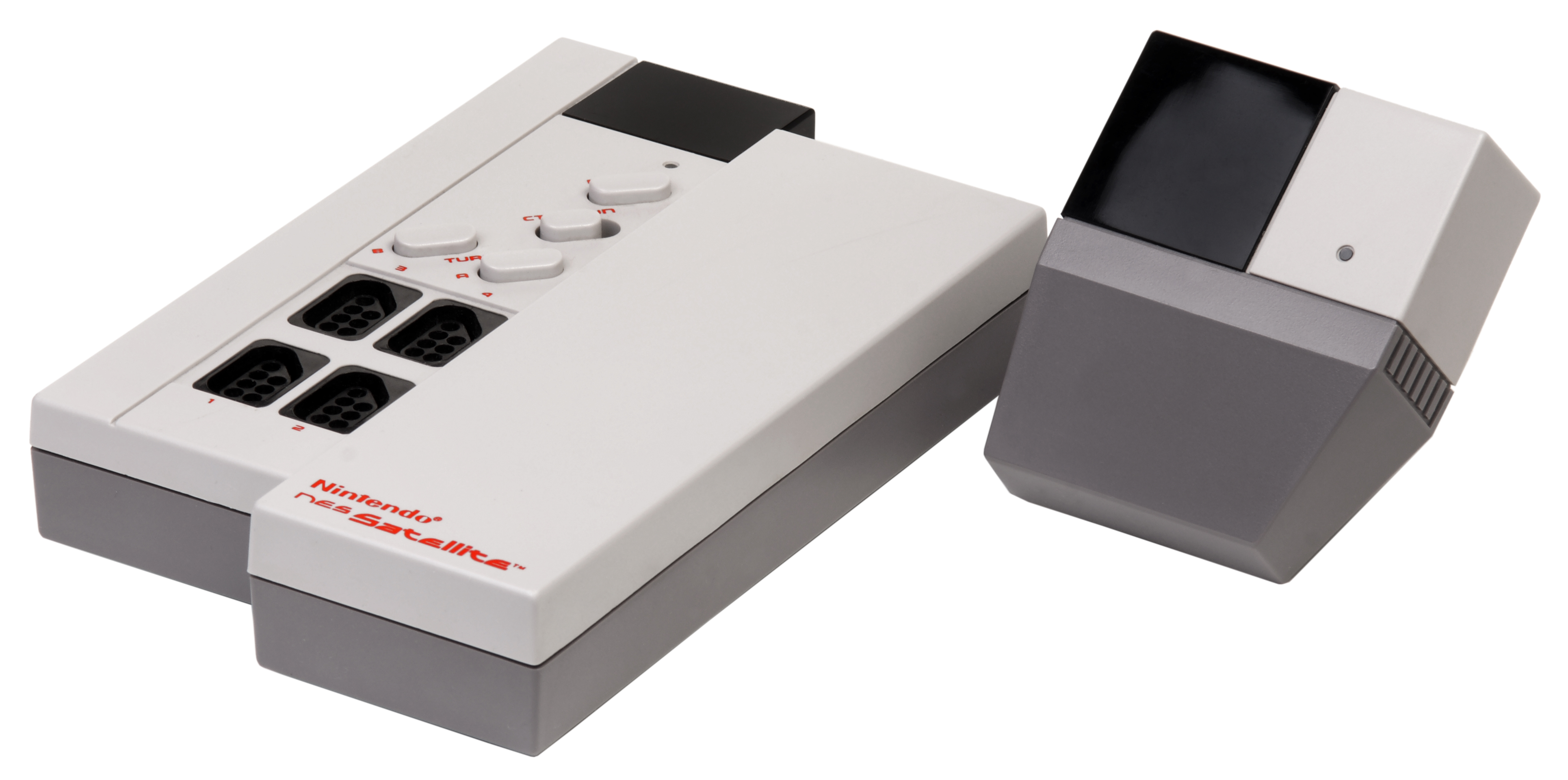
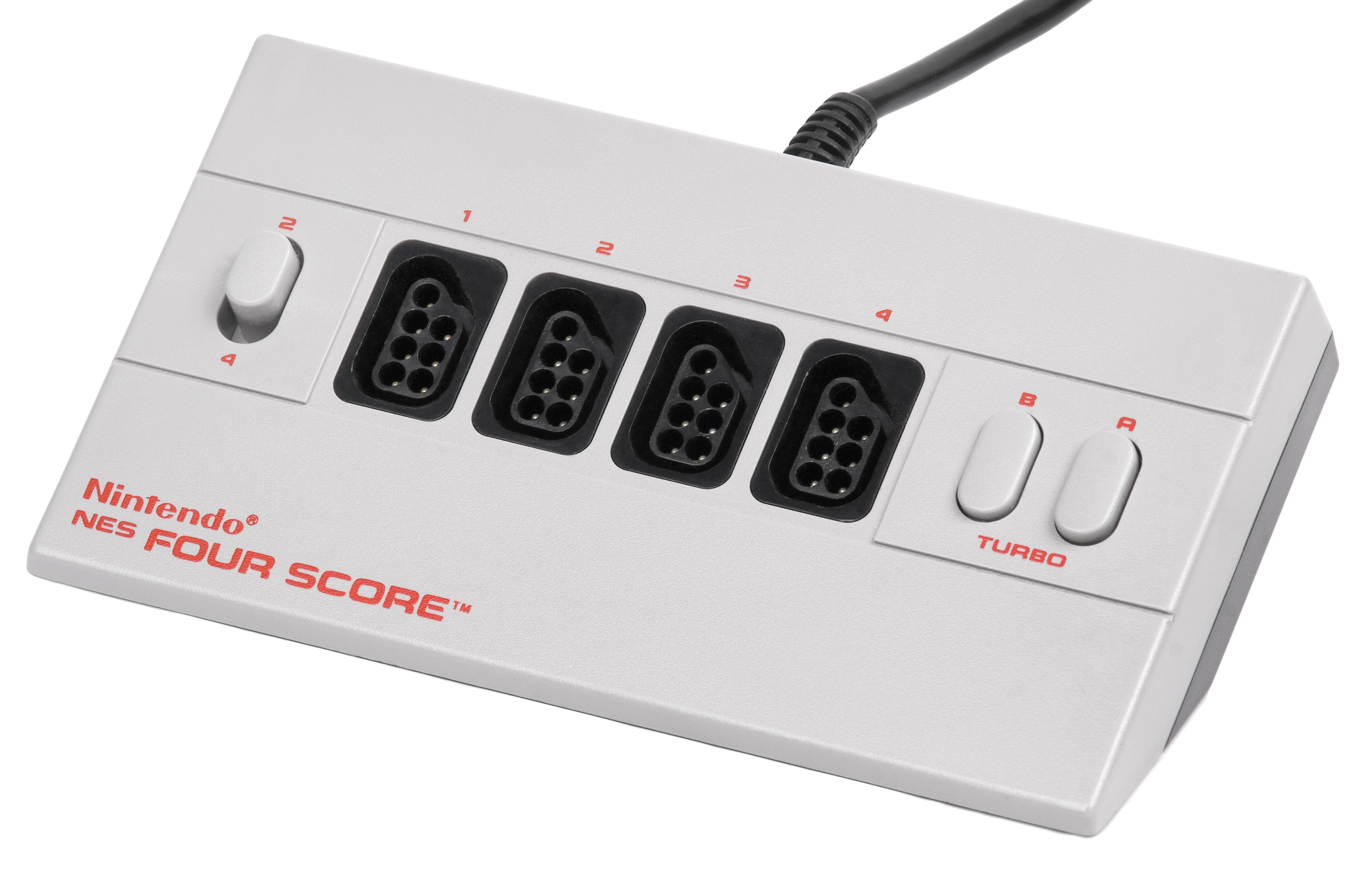
The three-player multiplayer mode requires the NES Satellite (left) or NES Four Score (right).

Bomberman II was developed and published by Bomberman series creator Hudson Soft, and is a sequel to Bomberman (1985). Like the predecessor, it was created for the Nintendo Entertainment System, and was the final Bomberman game released for the console. Bomberman II was designed by Hitoshi Okuno, later the director of Bomberman 64 (1997), and programmed by Yasuhiro Kosaka, who would provide programmming works for Japanese role-playing video games like Tengai Makyō: Fuun Kabukiden (1993) and Elemental Gimmick Gear (1999). Mika Sasaki and Jun Chikuma, respectively the graphic designer and the composer of Bomberman (1990), returned to their role for Bomberman II.

Bomberman II was released in Japan on June 28, 1991. It was released in Europe in 1992 and in North America in March 1993. The European version was published under the title Dynablaster because the 1985 Bomberman was not released there. The North American version was given a box art by Greg Martin, a former Hanna-Barbera artist and freelance illustrator who created packaging artwork for video games like the Sonic the Hedgehog series. The three-player Battle Mode is compatible to the NES Satellite and NES Four Score.

On December 8, 2005, Bomberman II was re-released as part of Hudson Best Collection Vol. 1: Bomberman Collection, a Game Boy Advance dual release also featuring Bomberman (1985). The Japanese version was included in the 2026 compilation Super Bomberman Collection.

== Reception ==
Reception

Review scores
Publication	Score
Famitsu	8/10, 7/10, 7/10, 5/10
Game Players	6/10
VideoGames & Computer Entertainment	8/10
N-Force	74/100

Four writers reviewed Bomberman II in Famitsu. One reviewer said that if users had played the PC Engine version of the game, they may find the multiplayer mode disappointing as it did not have as many potential players, but that it was still lots of fun. Another complimented the game as having better gameplay balance. One reviewer found it disappointing as it had a smaller playfield than the original, but that the simultaneous gameplay more than made up for it.
