= Dilute (band) =

Rock band from Fremont, California

- Origin: Fremont, California, U.S.
- Genres: Indie rock; indie pop; instrumental rock; math rock; post-rock; experimental rock; experimental pop; art rock; noise rock
- Years active: 1996–2003; 2015 (one-off release)
- Labels: 54°40' or Fight!; Toad Records; Sick Room Records Ltd.
- Spinoffs: Okay; Natural Dreamers; Jacques Kopstein; 31Knots
- Past members: Marty Anderson (guitar, vocals); Ian Pellicci (guitar); Jay Pellicci (drums); Craig Colla (bass guitar)

Dilute was an indie and math rock band formed in 1996 in Fremont, California, active from 1997 to 2002. Its members have been in bands such as Okay, Natural Dreamers, 31knots, and Jacques Kopstein. They have two full-length studio albums, The Gypsy Valentine Curve (Self released in 2000 and later re-distributed by 54°40' or Fight! in 2001) and Grape Blueprints Pour Spinach Olive Grape (2001), and a live album with Hella. They had been signed through three record labels, 54°40' or Fight!, Toad Records, and Sickroom Records.

The band was planning a third album but disbanded before it was ever finished.

Marty Anderson would be housebound due to his Crohn's disease getting worse in 2001, later began the musical project 'Okay'.

In 2015 Marty Anderson released Dilute - Live on his bandcamp page, which included songs from the Hella + Dilute live split in better quality and songs from the 2003 Mini-CD Live Recordings that came with the 2003 Japanese reissue of The Gypsy Valentine Curve by Toad Records and also a few extra songs from live performances.

== Members ==
- Marty Anderson – guitar, vocals
- Jay Pellicci – drums
- Craig Colla – bass guitar
- Ian Pellicci – guitar

== Discography ==
=== Albums ===
- The Gypsy Valentine Curve (54°40' or Fight!, Toad Records) - Released 2001
- Grape Blueprints Pour Spinach Olive Grape (54°40' or Fight!) - Released 2001
- Hella + Dilute live split (Sickroom Records), with Hella - Released 2003
- Dilute - Live (Self Release) - Released 2015

=== EPs ===
- Live Recordings (Toad Records) - Released 2003
