= Wavves discography =

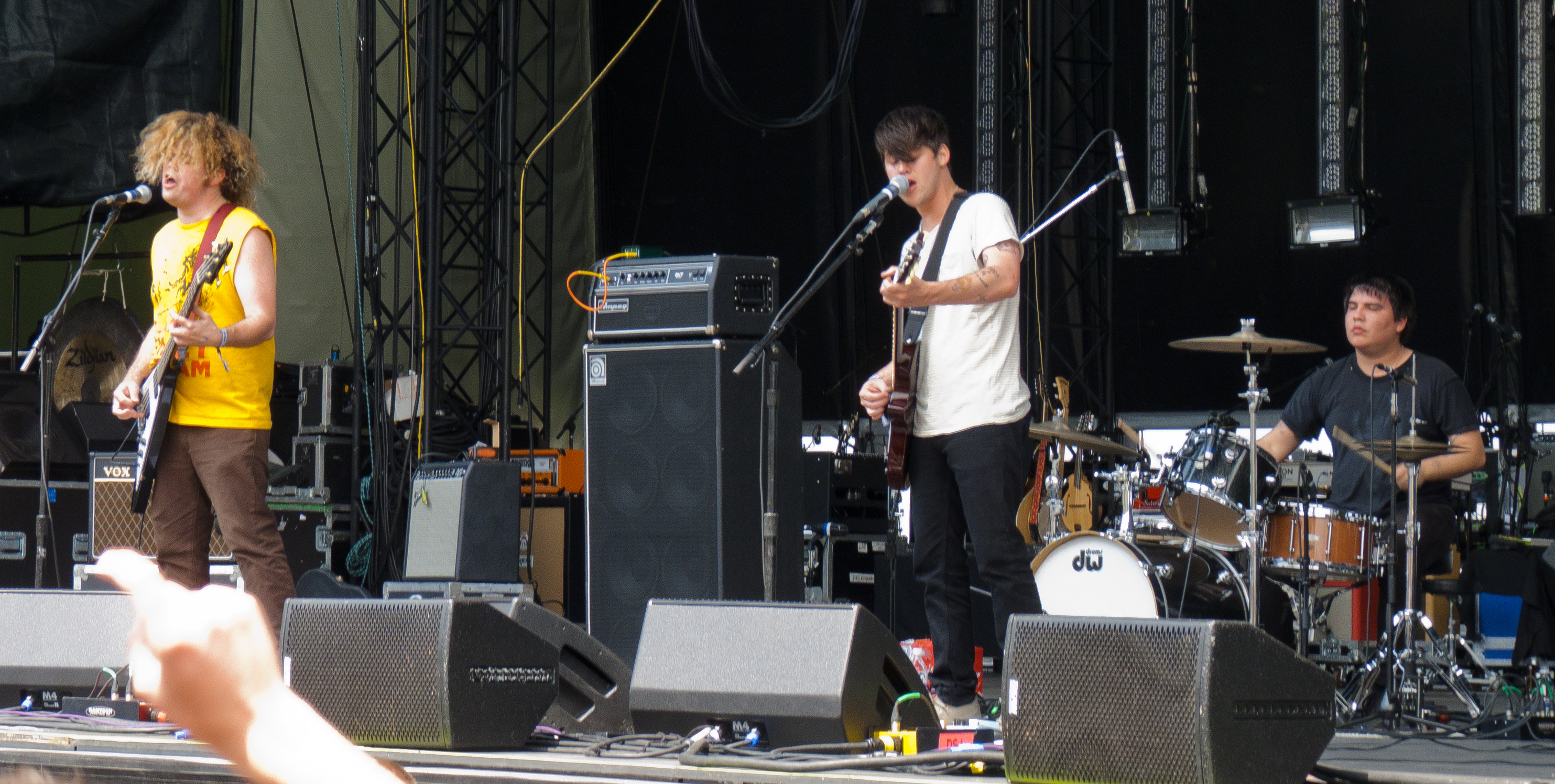
- Wavves performing at Sasquatch in 2011
- Studio albums: 10
- EPs: 1
- Singles: 38
- Music videos: 13
- Collaboration albums: 1

The following is the discography of Wavves, an American rock band, formed in San Diego, California, in 2008 by singer-songwriter Nathan Williams.

== Albums ==
=== Studio albums ===
List of studio albums, with selected chart positions, sales figures and certifications
Title	Album details	Peak chart positions				
Title	Album details	US	US Ind.	US Alt.	US Rock	AUS
Wavves	Released: September 30, 2008; Label: Woodsist	—	—	—	—	—
Wavvves	Released: February 3, 2009; Label: De Stijl	—	—	—	—	—
King of the Beach	Released: August 3, 2010; Label: Fat Possum Records	168	28	—	—	—
Afraid of Heights	Released: March 26, 2013; Label: Warner Bros.	81	—	15	25	—
V	Released: October 2, 2015; Label: Warner Bros.	133	—	17	30	85
You're Welcome	Released: May 19, 2017; Label: Ghostramp	— (Note: You're Welcome did not enter the US Billboard 200, but peaked at number 95 on the US Top Album Sales Chart.)	14	12	20	—
Hideaway	Released: July 16, 2021; Label: Fat Possum Records	—	—	—	—	—
Babes	Released: September 11, 2023; Label: Self-released	—	—	—	—	—
Spun	Released: June 27, 2025; Label: Ghost Ramp	—	—	—	—	—
Cherry Soda	Released: November 13, 2026; Label: I Surrender	—	—	—	—	—
"—" denotes a recording that did not chart or was not released in that territory.

=== Collaborative albums ===
List of collaborative albums
Title	Album details
No Life for Me (with Cloud Nothings)	Released: June 28, 2015; Label: Ghost Ramp

== Extended plays ==
List of extended plays
Title	Album details
Summer Is Forever (with Best Coast & No Joy)	Released: January 11, 2011; Label: Mexican Summer
Life Sux	Released: September 20, 2011; Label: Ghost Ramp
Summer Is Forever II (with Best Coast)	Released: January 2016; Label: Ghost Ramp

== Singles ==
List of singles, with selected chart positions and certifications, showing year released and album name
Title	Year	Peak chart positions				Album
Title	Year	US Alt.	JPN Air	MEX Air.	UK Sales	Album
"Mickey Mouse"	2008	—	—	—	—	Non-album single
"Weed Demon"	2008	—	—	—	—	Wavvves
"So Bored"	2008	—	—	25	61	Wavvves
"California Goths"	2009	—	—	—	—	Wavvves
"Friends Were Gone"	2009	—	—	—	—	Wavvves
"To the Dregs"	2009	—	—	—	—	Wavvves
"No Hope Kids"	2009	—	—	—	—	Wavvves
"Post Acid"	2010	—	—	—	—	King of the Beach
"King of the Beach"	2010	—	—	—	—	King of the Beach
"Got Something For You" (with Best Coast)	2010	—	—	32	—	The Christmas Gig
"Bug"	2011	—	—	43	—	Life Sux
"Hippies Is Punks"	2012	—	—	—	—	Afraid of Heights
"Sail to the Sun"	2012	—	—	—	—	Afraid of Heights
"Demon to Lean On"	2013	36	—	40	—	Afraid of Heights
"Afraid of Heights"	2013	—	—	—	—	Afraid of Heights
"That's on Me"	2013	—	—	—	—	Afraid of Heights
"Nine Is God"	2013	—	—	—	—	The Music of Grand Theft Auto V
"Leave"	2015	—	—	—	—	Welcome to Los Santos
"Way Too Much"	2015	—	—	—	—	V
"Flamezesz"	2015	—	—	—	—	V
"Heavy Metal Detox"	2015	—	99	—	—	V
"My Head Hurts"	2015	—	—	—	—	V
"Pony"	2015	—	—	—	—	V
"Daisy / You're Welcome"	2017	—	—	—	—	You're Welcome
"Animal"	2017	—	—	—	—	You're Welcome
"Million Enemies"	2017	—	—	—	—	You're Welcome
"No Shade"	2017	—	—	—	—	You're Welcome
"Stupid in Love"	2017	—	—	—	—	You're Welcome
"The Lung"	2017	—	—	—	—	Non-album singles
"Up and Down" (with Culture Abuse)	2017	—	—	—	—	Non-album singles
"Big Cloud" (with Culture Abuse)	2018	—	—	—	—	Non-album singles
"All Star Goth"	2018	—	—	—	—	Non-album singles
"Emo Christmas"	2018	—	—	—	—	Non-album singles
"Sinking Feeling"	2021	—	—	—	—	Hideaway
"Hideaway"	2021	—	—	—	—	Hideaway
"So Long"	2025	—	—	—	—	Spun
"Goner"	2025	—	—	—	—	Spun
"Pinesol"	2026	—	—	—	—	Cherry Soda
"—" denotes a recording that did not chart or was not released in that territory.

=== Guest appearances ===
List of guest appearances, with other performing artists, showing year released and album name
Title	Year	Artist(s)	Album
"Shoes For Running"	2012	Big Boi, B.o.B.	Vicious Lies and Dangerous Rumors

== Music Videos ==
Title	Year	Ref.
"No Hope Kids"	2009	
"So Bored"	2009	
"Post Acid"	2010	
"King of the Beach"	2011	
"Bug"	2011	
"Sail To The Sun"	2012	
"That's On Me"	2013	
"Demon To Lean On"	2013	
"Afraid of Heights"	2013	
"Way Too Much"	2015	
"My Head Hurts"	2015	
"Million Enemies"	2017	
"Stupid in Love"	2017	
