= Andy Morin =

American music producer (born 1986)

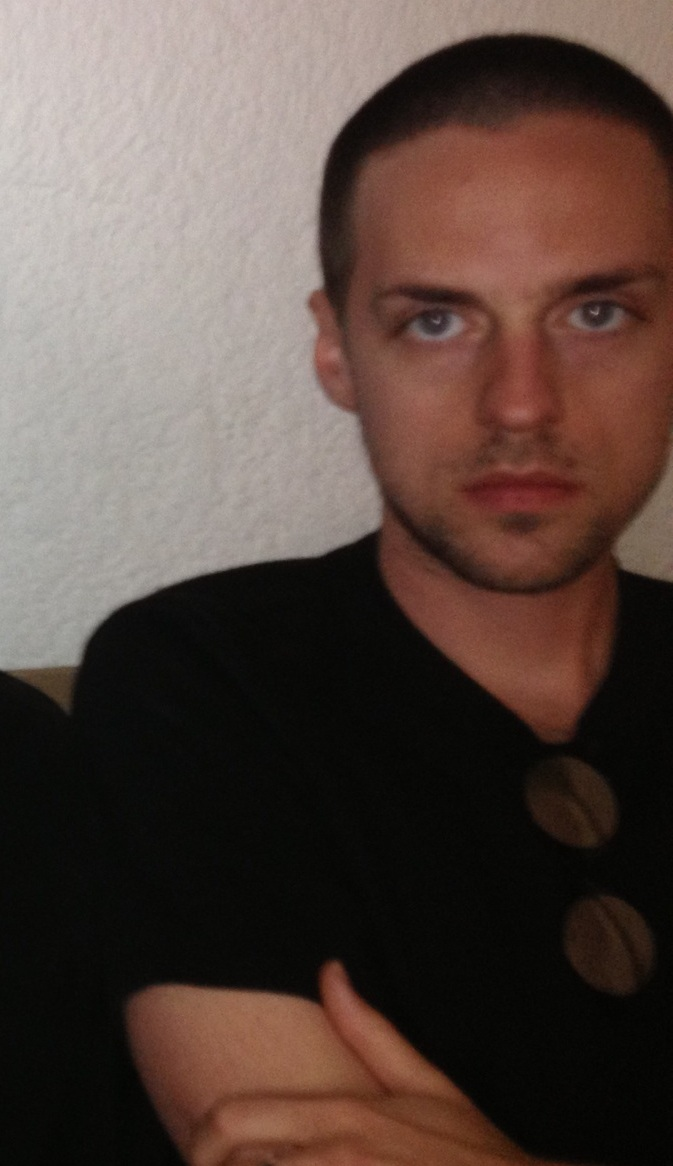
- Morin in 2014.

Background information
- Also known as: Flatlander
- Born: May 16, 1986 (age 40)
- Occupations: Music producer; engineer; musician
- Instruments: Keyboards; synthesizers; sampler; bass guitar
- Labels: Third Worlds; Harvest; Epic; Deathbomb Arc; A2B2
- Member of: Death Grips (Note: Morin's status in the band is currently unknown; recent posts from the band sign off as "Stefan and Zach," without mention of Morin.); The I.L.Y's (Note: Currently on hiatus); Nervous Cop

Andy Morin (born May 16, 1986) is an American record producer, engineer, musician, and record label executive. He is best known as a third of the experimental hip hop trio Death Grips, along with MC Ride and Zach Hill. He is also a member of the band the I.L.Y's with Hill. In 2022, he founded the record label A2B2.

== Career ==
Andy Morin was born on May 16, 1986. He first met Zach Hill in 2009 while collaborating with Nathan Williams on the aborted Wavves album Babes, and would work with Hill again on his second solo album Face Tat, both of whom were recorded at Morin's personal studio in Sacramento, California. Shortly following Hill and MC Ride forming Death Grips, Morin was recruited to produce the band, initially going under the name "Flatlander" on early releases such as Exmilitary. Following his recruitment, he worked as the band's producer and engineer, as well as its keyboardist. In 2015, Morin and Hill formed the band The I.L.Y's, releasing three studio albums before going on hiatus in 2017. Upon the reformation of Hill's previous band Nervous Cop, Morin joined the band and performed on their 2017 self-titled EP. In 2022, Morin founded the record label A2B2, with their first release being Death Insurance's I'm In Your Walls. In 2024, Morin co-produced the album Perfect Answer by Evanora Unlimited, The next year, he co-produced the single "Shark Brain / Dolphin" by Eartheater and Shygirl.

In 2025, a leaked message between Morin and a fan, in which Morin stated that the band was over, fueled discussion that Death Grips may have broken up. However, later that year, a social media post by the band confirmed they were still active. The post was only signed by Hill and Ride. Additionally, later in 2025, the band would announce on social media that they were working on a new studio album, again with no signature from Morin.

== Discography ==
=== Solo discography ===
Mixtapes

- NOF2 USB (2021)

Singles

- "Dolphin Remix" (2021)
- "STFU" (2021)
- "Breakdown" (2021)
- "French Kiss the Abyss" (2021, with The Garden)
- "Dig Yourself a Grave" (2022)
- "Cyber Baby Angel Night Terror Mix 154bpm V3" (2022)
- "Le Compas (Beacon for the Forgotten)" (2022)
- "Venice / Sandman darkmixxx" (2022)

=== The I.L.Y's ===
- I've Always Been Good at True Love (2015)
- Scum With Boundaries (2016)
- Bodyguard (2017)

=== Nervous Cop ===
- Nervous Cop (2017, EP)

=== As producer ===
Wavves

- Babes (2023, recorded 2009)

LustSickPuppy

- "BUSTDUSTER" (2021)
- As Hard As You Can (2022)

Evanora Limited

- Perfect Answer (2024)

Eartheater

- "Shark Brain / Dolphin" (2025)

=== As mixing engineer ===
Hella

- Tripper (2011)
