= Babes (album) =

Studio album by Wavves
- Released: September 11, 2023
- Recorded: June–November 2009
- Studios: A church Morin Studios, Sacramento
- Genres: Noise pop, lo-fi
- Length: 40:23
- Label: Self-released
- Producers: Andy Morin; Nathan Williams

Wavves chronology
Hideaway (2021)	Babes (2023)	Spun (2025)

Singles from Wavvves
- 1. "Cool Jumper" Released: August 12, 2009

Babes is the eighth studio album by American band Wavves, recorded in 2009. Although it was intended to be either the band's third or fourth studio album, it was not released officially until September 11, 2023, when it was self-released on Wavves' official Patreon account.

== History ==
In May 2009, singer Nathan Williams experienced a public breakdown as the band was unable to complete their set at the 2009 Primavera Sound festival in Barcelona. As a result, the band cancelled the remainder of their European tour, and all members except Williams left.

Zach Hill would join the band as the drummer of Wavves in mid 2009. They would intensely collaborate in this short time, and an entire album's worth of material was recorded. "Cool Jumper" was the sole single released promoting the album. Songs from the album were played live throughout 2009 and a Daytrotter session was recorded to promote the album. Although Hill was happy with the recorded material, and expressed further plans for Wavves, a bad left hand injury in November 2009 forced him to withdraw, and he would not return to the band afterwards, being replaced by Stephen Pope and Billy Hayes from Jay Reatard's backing band.

Williams reported that the album was to be expected towards the end of 2010, but this never materialised. Songs such as "Super Soaker" and "Post Acid" were later re-recorded for Wavves' third album, King of the Beach. In 2011 Hill commented his dismay that the full album had still not been released, and four more tracks such as "Horse Shoes", "Hula Hoop", "Goldy Lox", and "Glued" were self-released by Williams throughout 2011. Rumours about the album continued to persist for years.

Andy Morin, Hill's collaborator and later band member in Death Grips, was said to have produced and recorded the album; the recording location and dates overlap with his producing role on Hill's album Face Tat, and Williams is also thanked in the album's credits. After 14 years, in early 2023 the MP3 files for the album were found on Morin's personal Soulseek account 'epicproblem', which was leaked and spread by fans as a digital bootleg. Williams reacted by releasing the full album on the band's official Patreon page on September 11, 2023.

== Reception ==
Upon the release of "Cool Jumper" in 2009, Joe Colly of Pitchfork commented that "Zach Hill's presence is immediately felt in the song's fierce asymmetrical percussion and electronic-soaked textures, which provide exciting counterpoint to Williams' surfer-boy vocal delivery." Ryan Dombal commented on the 2011 release of "Horse Shoes" that it was "a bit more on the garage side of the garage-punk divide and ends with a manic slash of sped-up guitars and drums."

== Track listing ==
No.	Title	Length
1.	"Goldy Lox"	2:29
2.	"Super Soaker"	3:28
3.	"Headrush"	1:09
4.	"Gemini"	1:55
5.	"Cool Jumper"	5:57
6.	"Horse Shoes"	4:17
7.	"Post Acid"	1:34
8.	"Spit My Teeth"	3:12
9.	"Sleep All Day"	3:22
10.	"Hula Hoop"	2:54
11.	"Glued"	2:40
12.	"Bed Demon"	2:34
13.	"Baseball Cards"	5:29
Total length:		41:05

== Personnel ==
Wavves

- Nathan Williams – lead vocals, guitar, production
- Zach Hill – drums, percussion

Additional personnel

- Andy Morin – production, mixing, recording
