= Kim Talon =

Kim Talon is a Brooklyn-based musician and songwriter from Winnipeg, Manitoba. She is half-Lithuanian, half-Canadian and is a middle child.

Talon's new project is called Kino Kimino, the debut album was produced by John Agnello and features Sonic Youth members Lee Ranaldo and Steve Shelley. The album entitled "Bait for Sissies" released on June 3, 2016 on Wavves frontman's record label Ghost Ramp in the United States and on My Favourite Chords for Europe and Japan.

== Discography ==
=== KINO KIMINO ===
- Bait is for Sissies (2016) (Ghost Ramp (US) and My Favourite Chords (EUR/JAP)

=== JAN ===
- Jan (2012) (Enclaves)

=== Eagle & Talon ===
- In Manila - EP (2011) (Bi/Akka Records)
- Thracian (2009) (Bi/Akka Records)
- Eagle and Talon Cares (2005) (Bi/Akka Records)
