= Billy Hayes (musician) =

American drummer

- Born: August 7, 1985 (age 41); Miami, Florida
- Genres: Noise rock, garage punk, psychedelic pop, hardcore punk
- Occupations: Singer-songwriter, former drummer, back-up vocalist
- Instruments: Vocals, drums, keyboards/synths
- Years active: 2005–present
- Labels: Fat Possum, Goner Records, HoZac Records, Best of Times Records

Billy Hayes (born August 7, 1985) is an American musician and former drummer and back-up vocalist for Wavves and Jay Reatard.

Hayes first performed in the Memphis hardcore punk band, That Was Then. Later he started playing in psychedelic pop bands MÜTZ, the Barbaras and the Boston Chinks, all based in Memphis, Tennessee.

Hayes played drums in Jay Reatard's band from 2005 to 2009. While in Reatard's band, Hayes drummed on the Matador Singles Collection, Watch Me Fall, and a split 7-inch with Sonic Youth. Hayes and bandmate Stephen Pope quit in October 2009 before joining Wavves. In Wavves, he drummed, sang back-up vocals and wrote two songs on their third album King of the Beach: "Convertible Balloon" and "Baby Say Goodbye", the album's closing track. Hayes left Wavves in November 2010. Hayes' song "Stained Glass (Won't You Let Me into Your Heart)" was released on the Wavves EP "Summer is Forever" in January 2011.

Hayes has a new band called Cretin Stompers, along with Alex Gates, a guitarist for Wavves, and BIG MUFF, a musician/producer based in Brooklyn, NY. Their debut LP, "Looking Forward to Being Attacked", was released in the Spring of 2014 on HoZac Records.
