= Say Yes to Love =

Say Yes to Love may refer to:

- Say Yes to Love (film), a 2012 Indian Hindi-language romance film
- Say Yes to Love (album), a 2014 album by Perfect Pussy
