= So Stressed =

American rock and roll band

So Stressed is an American noise rock band from Sacramento, California, that uses synthesizer, drums, and guitar to make music. Currently, the band's line-up includes Morgan Fox and Kenneth Draper, while guest guitarists join them during live performances. Their music is frequently highlighted for the loud, abrasive, anxious, and catchy nature of their songs.

== History ==
So Stressed started as a group of friends that played shows around Northern California as of 2009. Draper stated in an interview with BL!SSS Magazine that the group's origins were in producing instrumental and improvisational music. For several years, membership in the band included Andrew Garcia as guitarist.

Their music is recorded with Patrick Hills at Earth Tone Records, also in Sacramento, CA.

The band's first EP, Attracted to Open Mouths, was released by Music Ruins Lives. While on Meredith Graves' record label, Honor Press, they released their first LPThe Unlawful Trade of Greco-Roman Art. Current music is released on vinyl through LA-based label, Ghost Ramp. They have toured with bands such as Wreck and Reference, Kino Kimino, and Wavves.

== Band members ==
=== Current members ===
- Morgan Fox, vocals and synthesizer

=== Past members ===
- Andrew Garcia, guitar
- Kenneth Hume Draper, drums and guitar

== Discography ==
=== LPs ===
- Pale Lemon (2018)
- Please Let Me Know (2017)
- The Unlawful Trade of Greco-Roman Art (2015)

=== EPs ===
- PC Duster (2016)
- Attracted to Open Mouths (2012)

=== Singles ===
- The King's Wig (2017)
- Hype Sticker (2016)
- Merv King & the Phantoms (2015)
