= King of the Beach =

King of the Beach may refer to:

- King of the Beach (Chris Rea album), 2000
- King of the Beach (Wavves album), 2010
- King of the Beach, The Incredible Hulk season 4, episode 9
