= Sweet Valley =

Sweet Valley may refer to:

- Sweet Valley, Pennsylvania, an unincorporated community
- Sweet Valley High, a series of novels
- Sweet Valley (music group), a music duo in Los Angeles
- "Sweet Valley", a 1998 song by American R&B singer Eboni Foster
