= I've Always Been Good at True Love =

Studio album by The I.L.Y's
- Released: June 4, 2015
- Genres: Art punk; garage rock; noise pop; grunge
- Length: 28:44
- Label: Third Worlds
- Producer: Zach Hill

The I.L.Y's chronology
I've Always Been Good at True Love (2015)	Scum with Boundaries (2016)

I've Always Been Good at True Love is the debut studio album by American rock duo the I.L.Y's, featuring Zach Hill and Andy Morin of Death Grips. The album was released for free download on June 4, 2015, through Death Grips' vanity label Third Worlds.

== Background and music ==
On June 4, 2015, Death Grips' Twitter account shared a download link for the album, hosted on Death Grips' Third Worlds website. No other information regarding the album or the artist were provided, which led to fan theories and speculations. Fans and critics speculated that the I.L.Y's was a side project of Death Grips members involving Tera Melos guitarist Nick Reinhart or an opening act for the band's 2015 summer tour. On June 14, 2015, Death Grips confirmed that The I.L.Y's is a side project of Death Grips members Zach Hill and Andy Morin, and hinted that they plan on releasing the album physically.

Musically, the album features an art punk and a "noisy garage rock" sound. It has been regarded as a continuation of the rock-oriented sound of Death Grips' fourth studio album, The Powers That B and drew comparisons to Hill's 2010 solo album Face Tat.

== Critical reception ==
Professional ratings
Review scores
Source	Rating
Consequence of Sound	D

The album received mixed reviews from music critics. Consequence of Sound critic Brian Josephs stated: "I’ve always been good at true love is in line with the straightforward rock distortion of Jenny Death, but it’s nowhere near as exciting," with ultimately describing the album as "dried, blotchy, and bland."

== Track listing ==
All tracks are written by Zach Hill and Andy Morin.

No.	Title	Length
1.	"The Sickest Fuck of Them All"	2:43
2.	"Itchy Itchy Itchy"	2:58
3.	"My Career"	2:27
4.	"Articulate (I'm Going So Far Into You)"	3:05
5.	"Bubble Letters"	3:05
6.	"Specialized"	3:17
7.	"Sustain"	3:03
8.	"The Whole Thing"	3:48
9.	"All She Does Is Kill Shit"	4:13
Total length:		28:44

== Personnel ==
The I.L.Y's

- Zach Hill – vocals, drums, keyboards, guitar, production
- Andy Morin – guitar, bass, engineering
