= Meredith Graves =

American musician

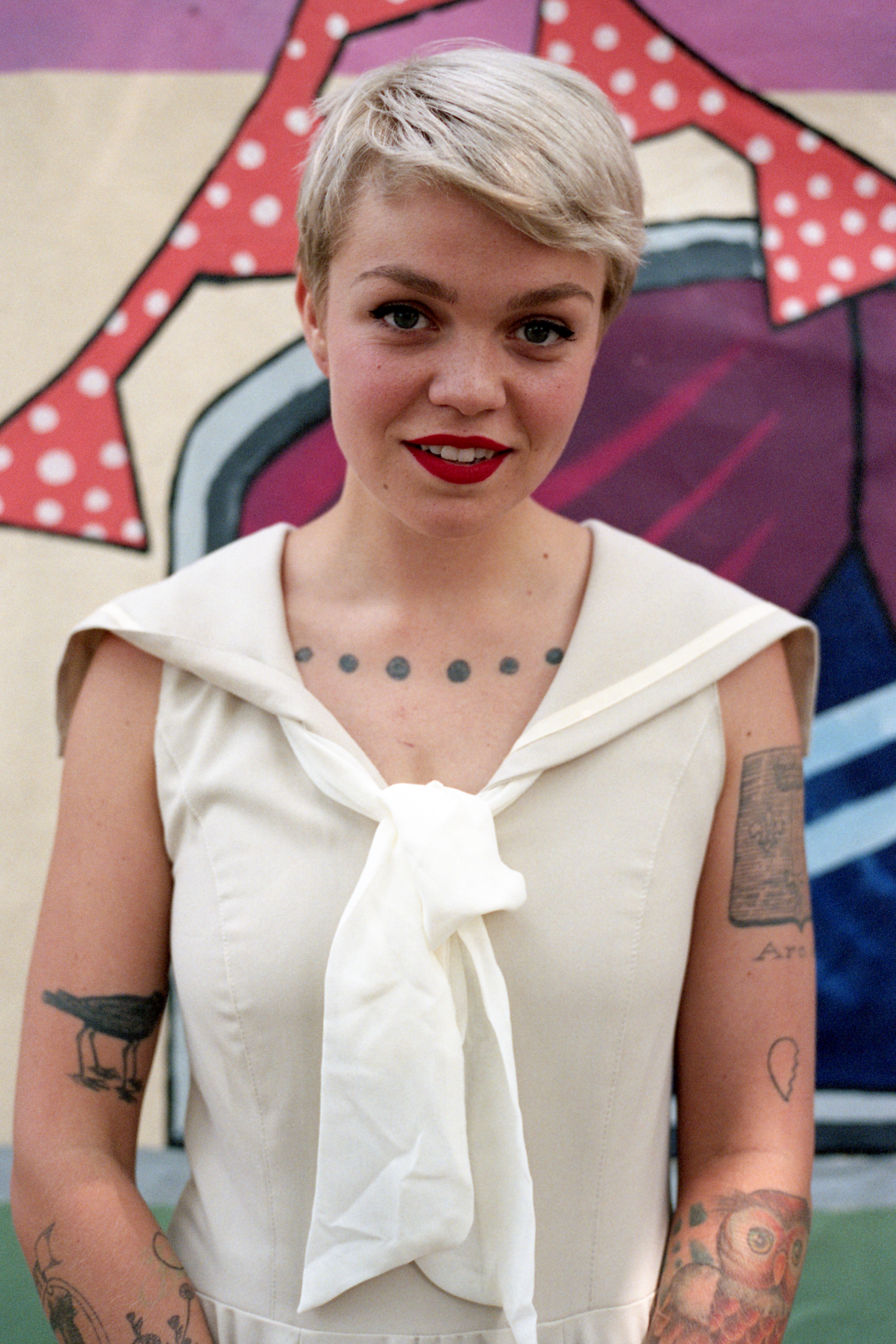
- Meredith Graves at the Pitchfork Festival 2014

Background information
- Born: September 5, 1987 (age 38)
- Occupation: Musician
- Instruments: Vocals, guitar
- Years active: 2006–present
- Label: Captured Tracks

Meredith Graves (born September 5, 1987) is an American musician. She fronted the punk rock band Perfect Pussy. In addition to making her own music, she ran independent music label Honor Press and served as director of music for the crowdfunding site Kickstarter. Graves is also a writer and music journalist, and has served as an anchor at MTV News.

== Early life ==
Meredith Graves was born on September 5, 1987. Graves began playing piano and guitar at age 11, and touring by age 19; their mother is also a performer, in musical theater. Her father is a journalist.

Graves learned to sew in high school and worked as a seamstress during and after college.

== Career ==
Early in her music career, Graves led a band called Mouse and the Love & Light Orkestra.

=== Shoppers ===
Graves was a guitarist and vocalist for Syracuse noise rock trio, Shoppers. The A.V. Club described their 2011 release Silver Year as "a short, intense breakup album about the terrible things we’re capable of when our feelings are hurt;" Punk News called it "top notch noise-rock."

=== Perfect Pussy ===
Graves next became frontwoman for the hardcore punk band Perfect Pussy, founded in 2012 in Syracuse, New York. After Shoppers disbanded, film director Scott Coffey asked Graves to appear in his movie Adult World, shooting in upstate New York. Graves assembled a "fake band" and wrote a song for the film, but even after filming, the group continued performing together, and posted their first demo I Have Lost All Desire for Feeling to Bandcamp in 2013.

In Billboard, Reggie Ugwu described the demo as "purpose-filled, bone-rattling and brisk, the kind of electrically charged debut that can shock a jaded blogger out of his torpor."

Ugwu noted "Graves’ hyper-literate, rapid-fire prose" on Perfect Pussy's 2014 LP Say Yes to Love. Say Yes to Love's release included a limited edition vinyl pressing of the record mixed with Graves's menstrual blood, which quickly sold out.

Perfect Pussy dissolved in January 2016.

=== Honor Press ===
In 2015, Graves founded a music label called Honor Press. Though Graves's own background is in hardcore, Honor Press is not an exclusively punk label; instead Graves describes the label's priorities as "No snobs, no phonies and no shitheads." She told New York that her positive experience making music for the label Captured Tracks had been the inspiration for Honor Press.

Honor Press's first release was Sacramento band So Stressed's The Unlawful Trade of Greco-Roman Art. Released in May 2015, Spin reviewed Unlawful Trade as a "strikingly sour premiere effort [that] comes courtesy of Meredith Graves' Honor Press label...one of the most potent post-hardcore assaults in recent memory."

Graves has indicated plans to publish books through Honor Press as well as music. The label's second signee is Los Angeles rapper Busdriver, also known as Regan John Farquhar, to produce a book and a 7". The book will be a poetry collection called Hat: A Movie.

Honor Press is located in Brooklyn, New York.

=== Writing ===
From 2015 to 2016, Graves was a columnist for the Village Voice, writing a food and music series called Recipe for Disaster. She has also written for The Guardian, Pitchfork, Rookie, and Talkhouse; Racked praises her as "an incredibly honest and thoughtful writer." Graves has drawn particular notice for commentary on topics like authenticity and double standards for women in music.

=== Other projects ===
In 2014, Graves announced she would put out a solo record, as well as a split with Kevin Devine. She debuted the solo project's first song, "Take the Ghost to the Movies," in 2015. Stereogum called it "one of those songs that you want to blast in your headphones when the world feels like it’s too much, and you want to block everything out, a noise dirge to silence the cacophony of the outside world."

In 2016, Graves was featured as the vocalist on the House of Feelings song "Avatar"; in Pitchfork, Philip Sherburne described her performance as "channel[ing] the stunned demeanor of someone who’s just clocked into her first day at work and is already numb to the grind."

In 2016, Graves became an anchor for MTV News.

In May 2018, Graves became director of music for crowdfunding website Kickstarter; the position was previously held by Molly Neumann of riot grrrl band Bratmobile (Neumann left Kickstarter to join digital music rights platform Songtrust).
