= Astrological Straits =

Studio album by Zach Hill
- Released: August 12, 2008
- Studio: Retrofit Recording (Sacramento, California, US)
- Genre: Rock
- Length: 92:38
- Label: Anticon; Ipecac
- Producer: Zach Hill, John Reed Thompson

Zach Hill chronology
Astrological Straits (2008)	Face Tat (2010)

Astrological Straits is the debut full-length solo studio album by American recording artist Zach Hill. It was released on August 12, 2008 by Anticon and Ipecac Recordings.

== Critical reception ==
Professional ratings
Aggregate scores
Source	Rating
Metacritic	72/100
Review scores
Source	Rating
Alternative Press	80/100
The Phoenix	3.5/5 stars
Pitchfork	6.9/10
PopMatters	6/10 stars
Spin	6/10
Sputnikmusic	2/5 stars

Astrological Straits has received generally favorable reviews from music critics. On Metacritic, which assigns a weighted average score out of 100 to reviews and ratings from mainstream critics, the album received a metascore of 72, based on six reviews. Michael Patrick Brady of The Phoenix called the album an "unrestrained torrent of challenging yet tuneful rock" and pointed out that this album served as an outlet for Hill's "abstract ideas". Marc Masters of Pitchfork Media found that Hill's drumming dominated the album. He compared the sound to the work of Liars, Boredoms, Lightning Bolt and Frank Zappa while comparing his vocals on the track "Hindsight Is Nowhere" to those of Angus Andrew, vocalist of Liars. John Bohannon of PopMatters complimented the melodies on the album while he criticized the "bombardment of snare drum and obnoxious electronic tones" as well as the choice of including Les Claypool in the album. Nick Greer of Sputnikmusic called Hill's drumming "virtuostic, strange, and interesting" while describing his vocals as compressed and monotonous. He compared the guitar sounds on the album to those of Hella's Spencer Seim's work with added "strange slides and electronic, microtonal blurs". Greer appreciated the more pop-driven songs to more experimental ones and called parts of the album "nearly unlistenable".

== Track listing ==
All tracks are written by Zach Hill

No.	Title	Length
1.	"Iambic Strays"	5:15
2.	"Toll Road (featuring Zac Nelson)"	4:46
3.	"Street People"	1:52
4.	"Dark Art"	4:21
5.	"Keep Calm and Carry On (featuring Chino Moreno)"	5:51
6.	"Hindsight is Nowhere"	4:03
7.	"Ummer"	1:59
8.	"Stoic Logic"	3:09
9.	"Uhuru"	8:47
10.	"Momentum"	4:19
11.	"Unseen Forces"	3:13
12.	"Tick On"	3:09
13.	"Astrological Straits (featuring Les Claypool)"	8:57
14.	"Necromancer (featuring Marnie Stern)"	32:57
Total length:		92:38

== Personnel ==
- Credits for Astrological Straits adapted from album liner notes.

Performance

- Steve Borth – saxophone
- Les Claypool – bass guitar
- Josh Hill – guitar
- Zach Hill – art direction, bass, cornet, electric piano, gong, guitar, drums, effects, keyboards, loops, mamola, melodica, piano, production, programming, synthesizer, trumpet, vocals
- Jonathan Hischke – bass, synth bass
- Dan Elkan – backup vocals, guitar
- Carson McWhirter – bass, recording
- Robby Moncrief – guitar
- Chino Moreno – vocals
- Zac Nelson – vocals
- Tyler Pope – effects, programming
- Randy Randall – guitar
- Katelyn Reeves – cornet, flute, photography
- Dean Spuntz – baritone guitar
- RT Thomas – guitar sample
- John Reed Thompson – bass, bugle, engineering, guitar, mixing, production, recording, trumpet
- Marco Benevento – piano (Necromancer)

Technical

- John Golden – mixing
- Rich Good – design

== Release history ==
Region	Date	Format(s)	Label	Ref.
United States	August 12, 2008	2CD	Ipecac	
United States	August 12, 2008	2LP	Anticon	
