= V (Wavves album) =

Studio album by Wavves
- Released: October 2, 2015
- Genre: Pop punk; surf punk; punk rock; garage rock
- Length: 31:15
- Label: Ghost Ramp; Warner Bros.
- Producer: Woody Jackson

Wavves chronology
No Life for Me (2015)	V (2015)	You're Welcome (2017)

V is the fifth studio album by the American rock band Wavves. The album was released on October 2, 2015, by Ghost Ramp and Warner Bros. Records.

== Reception ==
Professional ratings
Aggregate scores
Source	Rating
Metacritic	77/100
Review scores
Source	Rating
The 405	8.5/10 stars
AllMusic	4/5 stars
Consequence of Sound	B
Rolling Stone	3.5/5 stars
The A.V. Club	B+
DIY	5/5 stars
Pitchfork	6.5/10

Jon Caramanica of The New York Times called it "a peppy album about the tragic pleasures of wallowing in poor choices". He continued, "The balance of good cheer and dark clouds is partly in the arrangements — V comprises exceedingly bright songs verging on true pop-punk. It's probably the cleanest-sounding Wavves album to date." Collin Brennan in Consequence of Sound felt the album was "visceral and downright volatile [...] a self-assured record penned by a songwriter who's anything but sure of himself, and that dynamic shines right through the curtain of fuzz". In The 405, William Tomer commented that "one who chooses to listen to the album in full--an exceedingly easy task to do repeatedly given the immediate appeal of the record--will be treated to one of the most down-to-earth takes on what it is like to be actively battling your demons, internal or otherwise". Jon Dolan of Rolling Stone felt that "their songs have never been sharper, brighter or more confident".

== Cover artwork ==
The album cover represents the Minor Arcana's card of Five of Cups.

== Track listing ==
No.	Title	Length
1.	"Heavy Metal Detox"	3:17
2.	"Way Too Much"	2:33
3.	"Pony"	2:56
4.	"All the Same"	1:56
5.	"My Head Hurts"	2:49
6.	"Redlead"	3:40
7.	"Heart Attack"	2:44
8.	"Flamezesz"	2:25
9.	"Wait"	2:33
10.	"Tarantula"	3:20
11.	"Cry Baby"	3:12
Total length:		31:15

== Charts ==
Chart (2015)	Peak position
Australian Albums (ARIA)	85
US Billboard 200	133
