= Perfect Pussy =

American rock band

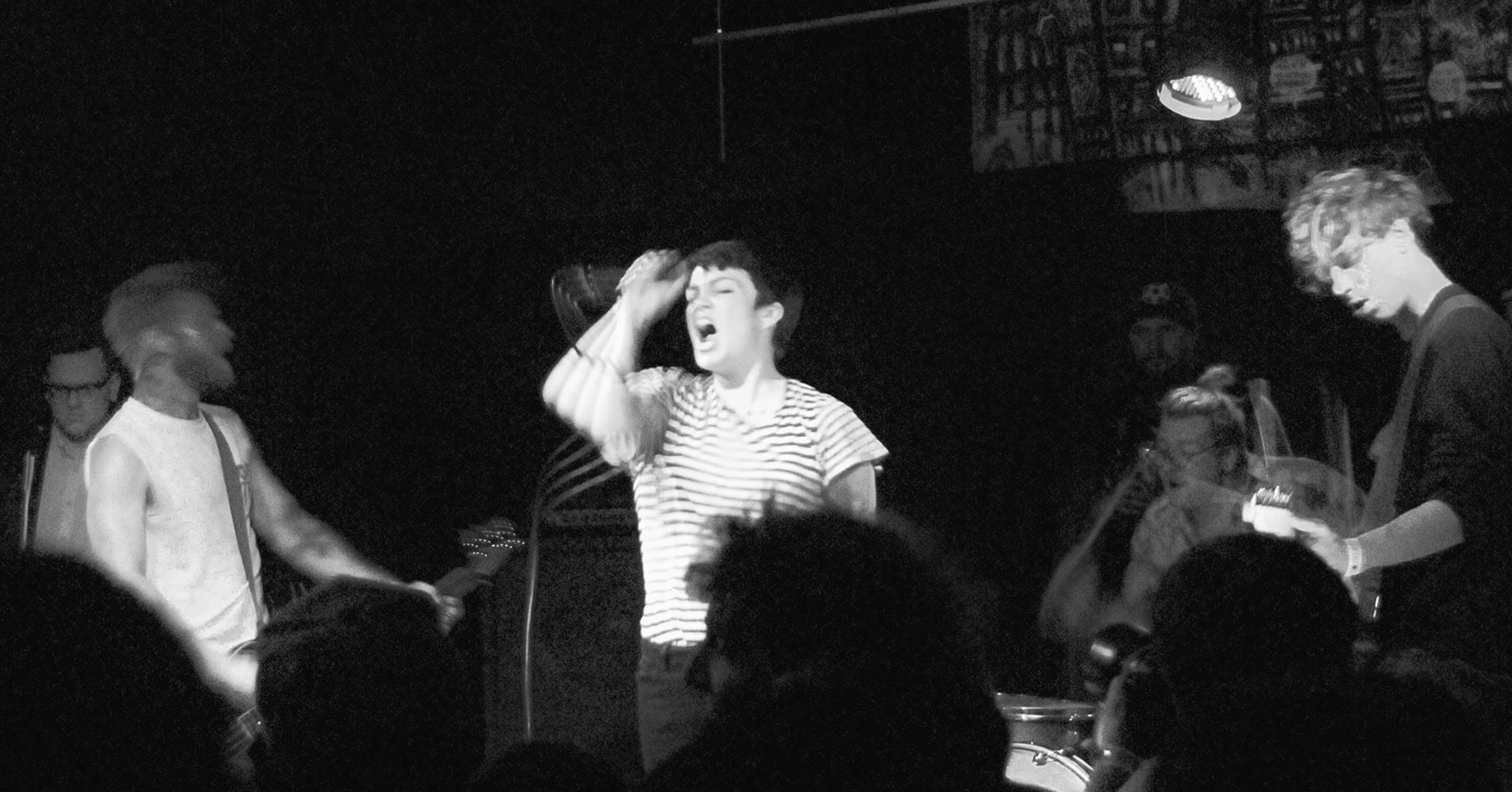
- Perfect Pussy performing at Treefort Music Fest in 2012

Background information
- Origin: Syracuse, New York, U.S.
- Genres: Noise rock, hardcore punk, lo-fi
- Years active: 2012–2016
- Label: Captured Tracks
- Past members: Meredith Graves; Ali Donohue; Ray McAndrew; Garrett Koloski; Shaun Sutkus; Greg Ambler
- Website: prrfectpussy.bandcamp.com

Perfect Pussy was an American rock band from Syracuse, New York. The band consisted of vocalist Meredith Graves, guitarist Ray McAndrew, drummer Garrett Koloski, bass guitarist Greg Ambler and keyboardist Shaun Sutkus. The band was known for its "frenetic brand of punk and raucous live shows" and has been described as "the most important punk band to come out of Syracuse since Earth Crisis."

== History ==
Prior to the formation of the band, the lead singer Meredith Graves performed folk music under the name Mouse and the Love & Light Orkestra, then subsequently was a member of the Syracuse-based noise rock trio Shoppers.

=== Founding ===
After Shoppers broke up, film director Scott Coffey approached Graves, asking her to perform with a band for his 2012 movie, Adult World. She assembled a "fake band," consisting of her, drummer Garrett Koloski of the rock band Sswampzz and bass guitarist Greg Ambler of SoreXcuse, and wrote the song for the film. In the aftermath of the filming, they kept performing together and were joined by Sswampzz guitarist Ray McAndrew and keyboardist Shaun Sutkus.

=== I Have Lost All Desire for Feeling ===
The band gained attention with its debut demo, a 13-minute EP called I Have Lost All Desire for Feeling, which was released independently in 2013. Reviewing the EP for Rolling Stone, Jon Dolan said "Punk-rock revelations like Perfect Pussy don't come along nearly often enough," and described their work as "the uncut truth of music that won't hold anything back." Pitchfork named I Have Lost All Desire for Feeling as an honorable mention on its list of the best albums of 2013, with critic Lindsay Zoladz saying "EP feels like the sustained climax of a horror movie, the aural equivalent of that moment when the heroine—tattered, bleeding, and suddenly superhumanly defiant—drives the devil out and is engulfed in a radioactive glow."

Perfect Pussy performed in CMJ music festival in 2013 and in SXSW in 2014, after signing to the Brooklyn-based Captured Tracks record label.

=== Say Yes to Love ===
The band's eight-song, 23-minute debut album Say Yes to Love was released on March 18, 2014, on Captured Tracks to predominantly enthusiastic reviews. Zoladz rated the album an 8.6 on Pitchfork's 10-point scale and a "Best New Music" designation, saying "It doesn't feel corny or hyperbolic to call this record life-affirming, so perfectly does it capture the flashes of gratitude, self-knowledge, and inexplicable joy that often follow an experience of great pain." At Rolling Stone, Rob Sheffield gave the album four of five stars, calling it a "a savagely awesome debut" and "a heart-punch of an album" he compares to Hüsker Dü and early Sleater-Kinney. At The A.V. Club, David Anthony describes Say Yes to Love as "continu[ing] the raging aggression of [Perfect Pussy's] demo [I Have Lost All Desire for Feeling] while also trying to remove itself from hardcore's oft-limiting structures," but argues that some of these departures have "Perfect Pussy getting out ahead of itself, suggesting the band would be better served securing an identity before attempting to redefine it."

=== Dissolution ===
The group disbanded in January 2016 after attempts to record a second album collapsed. Graves became an anchor for MTV News and Koloski formed a new band, based in Philadelphia, called Empath whose first album was produced by Sutkus.

== Band members ==
- Meredith Graves – vocals (2012–2016)
- Garrett Koloski – drums (2012–2016)
- Ray McAndrew – guitar (2012–2016)
- Shaun Sutkus – keyboards (2012–2016)
- Greg Ambler – bass guitar (2012–2014)
- Ali Donohue – bass guitar (2014–2016)

== Discography ==
=== LPs ===
Year	Title	Label	Format
2014	Say Yes to Love	Captured Tracks	12-inch vinyl LP / CD / MP3

=== EPs ===
- I Have Lost All Desire for Feeling (2013, self-released) (2015, Captured Tracks reissue)

=== Singles ===
- Astonishing Adventures! "The Captured Crusader" 7-inch EP split with Joanna Gruesome (2014, Captured Tracks, Slumberland Records, Fortuna Pop!)
