= Hideaway (Wavves album) =

Studio album by Wavves
- Released: July 16, 2021
- Studio: Dave Sitek's home studio (Los Angeles)
- Genres: Power pop; indie rock; pop punk
- Length: 29:15
- Label: Fat Possum
- Producers: Dave Sitek; Nathan Williams

Wavves chronology
You're Welcome (2017)	Hideaway (2021)	Babes (2023)

Hideaway is the seventh studio album by Wavves released on the record label Fat Possum Records on July 16, 2021. This was the band's first album since You're Welcome was released four years earlier. The band worked with producer Dave Sitek, and the album's themes were inspired by the COVID-19 pandemic.

== Background ==
In early 2019, Wavves began recording songs for what would become their seventh studio album. This would become their first new music released since the 2018 standalone singles "All Star Goth" and "Emo Christmas". After early studio sessions reportedly lacked surprises and "magic", according to frontman Nathan Williams, the band began working with producer Dave Sitek. According to Williams, melodies were initially built around short samples of songs from the 1950s and 1960s before removing those samples and creating the rest of the song's structure. The album's lyrical themes were reportedly inspired by Williams living in a shed behind his parents' house during the album's recording, along with the COVID-19 pandemic.

== Release and tour ==
On March 30, 2021, the album's first single "Sinking Feeling" was released. On May 4, 2021, the band officially announced the album, simultaneously releasing the second single "Help Is on the Way". The album was released by Fat Possum Records on July 16, 2021. On August 23, 2021, the band announced a live tour throughout the United States with 38 shows, starting in Las Vegas on October 1, 2021. This was the first live performance by the band since December 31, 2019, as plans to tour in support of the re-release of their third album King of the Beach had been cancelled due to the COVID-19 pandemic.

== Reception ==
Professional ratings
Aggregate scores
Source	Rating
Metacritic	69/100
Review scores
Source	Rating
AllMusic	3.5/5 stars
Beats Per Minute	58%
Classic Rock	5/10 stars
DIY	4/5 stars
Exclaim!	7/10
Kerrang!	3/5
The Line of Best Fit	58%
NME	4/5 stars
Pitchfork	6.2/10
Uncut	7/10

The album was met with generally favorable reviews by critics, scoring 69 out of 100 on Metacritic. NME called the album "Wavves' most original and varied work yet". In a mixed review, Pitchfork called the album's hooks "straightforward to a fault, and short on those small, sometimes barely even perceptible deviations from expectation that distinguish a sublime hook from a routine one". Classic Rock was more negative, calling it "an album full of lo-fi pop-tinged melodies sugarcoating a bitter centre".

== Track listing ==
No.	Title	Writer(s)	Length
1.	"Thru Hell"	Nathan Williams	2:46
2.	"Hideaway"	Dave Sitek; Williams	3:58
3.	"Help Is on the Way"	Sitek; Williams	3:24
4.	"Sinking Feeling"	Alex Gates	3:34
5.	"Honeycomb"	Stephen Pope	4:12
6.	"The Blame"	Sitek; Williams	3:08
7.	"Marine Life"	Williams	2:06
8.	"Planting a Garden"	Williams	2:25
9.	"Caviar"	Williams	3:48
Total length:			29:15

== Personnel ==
Wavves

- Nathan Williams – lead vocals, guitar (all tracks); production (1, 3)
- Stephen Pope – bass
- Alex Gates – guitar
- Ross Traver – drums

Additional personnel

- Dave Sitek – production, mixing, engineering
- Steve Fallone – mastering
- Derek Coburn – engineering
- Mikey Burey – artwork
- Max Taeuschel – layout
