= The I.L.Y's =

American experimental rock duo

- Origin: Sacramento, California, United States
- Genres: Experimental rock; garage rock; art punk
- Years active: 2015–2017 (on hiatus)
- Labels: Third Worlds; Castle Face
- Spinoff of: Death Grips
- Members: Zach Hill; Andy Morin

The I.L.Y's are an American experimental rock duo from Sacramento, California. They were formed in 2015 as a side project by Death Grips members Zach Hill (vocals, drums, guitar, and keyboard) and Andy Morin (guitar and bass). They have released two digital albums through Death Grips' Third Worlds label – I've Always Been Good at True Love in 2015 and Scum with Boundaries in 2016, both of which were released without any prior publicity. The I.L.Y's have never performed live other than as a part of Death Grips. They are currently signed with Castle Face Records, under which they have released their third studio album Bodyguard in 2017.

== History ==
The I.L.Y's existence was revealed on June 4, 2015, when a Twitter account associated with the experimental hip hop group Death Grips shared a download link for the album I've Always Been Good at True Love, hosted on Death Grips' Third Worlds website, providing no other information regarding the album or artist involved. Fans and critics speculated that the I.L.Y's were a side project composed of Death Grips members involving Tera Melos guitarist Nick Reinhart, or an opening act for the band's summer tour. Ten days later, Death Grips confirmed that the I.L.Y's are a side project formed by Zach Hill and Andy Morin, and hinted that they planned to release the album physically.

On July 16, 2016, the I.L.Y's released their second studio album titled Scum with Boundaries via YouTube and SoundCloud, again without any prior announcement.

On March 25, 2017, a third studio album titled Bodyguard, complete with track-listing and artwork was announced due for release later the same year. The band later shared a double music video for two songs from the album called "Gargoyle" and "Bobo". The album was digitally released on May 16, with a physical release via Castle Face Records arriving on June 16.

== Members ==
- Zach Hill – vocals, keyboards, guitar, drums, producer
- Andy Morin – guitar, bass, engineer, producer

== Discography ==
- I've Always Been Good at True Love (2015)
- Scum with Boundaries (2016)
- Bodyguard (2017)
