= Demon to Lean On =

Single by Wavves

from the album Afraid of Heights
- Released: January 29, 2013
- Genre: Alternative rock; indie rock; pop punk
- Length: 4:12
- Label: Warner Bros.
- Songwriter: Nathan Williams
- Producer: John Hill

Wavves singles chronology
"Sail to the Sun" (2012)	"Demon to Lean On" (2013)	"Afraid of Heights" (2013)

"Demon to Lean On" is a song by American rock band Wavves, released on January 29, 2013, as the third single from the group's fourth album, Afraid of Heights (2013).

== Charts ==
Chart (2013)	Peak position
US Alternative Airplay (Billboard)	36
