= You're Welcome (Wavves album) =

Studio album by Wavves
- Released: May 19, 2017
- Genre: Indie rock, pop punk, noise pop, garage rock
- Length: 35:22
- Label: Ghost Ramp
- Producer: Dennis Herring; Nathan Williams

Wavves chronology
V (2015)	You're Welcome (2017)	Hideaway (2021)

You're Welcome is the sixth studio album by the American rock band Wavves. The album was released on May 19, 2017 through Ghost Ramp.

== Track listing ==
All tracks are written by Nathan Williams unless otherwise noted. Produced by Dennis Herring and Nathan Williams. Recorded at dtla recording, Los Angeles, CA. Artwork by Nick Gazin.

No.	Title	Writer(s)	Length
1.	"Daisy"	Nathan Williams	2:32
2.	"You're Welcome"	Stephen Pope/Nathan Williams	3:00
3.	"No Shade"	Nathan Williams	1:46
4.	"Million Enemies"	Alex Gates/Nathan Williams	4:00
5.	"Hollowed Out"	Alex Gates/Nathan Williams	2:52
6.	"Come to the Valley"	Nathan Williams	2:56
7.	"Animal"	Alex Gates/Nathan Williams	2:44
8.	"Stupid in Love"	Nathan Williams	2:58
9.	"Exercise"	Stephen Pope/Nathan Williams	2:24
10.	"Under"	Stephen Pope/Nathan Williams	2:30
11.	"Dreams of Grandeur"	Nathan Williams	4:10
12.	"I Love You"	Nathan Williams	3:42
Total length:			35:22

== Reception ==
The album was met with generally favorable reviews by critics, scoring 71 out of 100 on Metacritic.

Professional ratings
Aggregate scores
Source	Rating
Metacritic	71/100
Review scores
Source	Rating
AllMusic	4/5 stars
DIY	4/5 stars
Exclaim!	8/10
Pitchfork	6.0/10
Uncut	7/10

== Charts ==
Chart (2017)	Peak position
US Top Album Sales (Billboard)	95
US Independent Albums (Billboard)	14
US Indie Store Album Sales (Billboard)	23
US Vinyl Albums (Billboard)	8
