= Life Sux =

EP by Wavves
- Released: September 20, 2011
- Recorded: Infrasonic Sound, L.A.
- Genres: Surf punk, grunge, noise rock, noise pop
- Length: 20:33
- Label: Ghost Ramp

Wavves chronology
King of the Beach (2010)	Life Sux (2011)	Afraid of Heights (2013)

Professional ratings
Aggregate scores
Source	Rating
Metacritic	67/100
Review scores
Source	Rating
Pitchfork	(6.7/10)
Rolling Stone	3.5/5 stars
Spin	(8/10)
Paste	(7.7/10)
Consequence of Sound	3.5/5 stars
Robert Christgau	(3-star Honorable Mention)

Life Sux is an EP by the artist Wavves released September 20, 2011 on the record label Ghost Ramp. It features collaborations with Best Coast and Fucked Up.

== Release ==
Prior to the release of the EP, the song "I Wanna Meet Dave Grohl" was featured on the premier of the MTV show "I Just Want My Pants Back". "Post Acid", the lead single from Wavves' 2010 album, King of the Beach, would also appear in the show.

Life Sux was released on vinyl, CD, and as a digital download through iTunes. As a bonus, the first 420 people to pre-order the vinyl received a limited edition green vinyl. The album peaked at #11 on the Billboard Heatseekers chart.

== Track listing ==
No.	Title	Length
1.	"Bug"	2:54
2.	"I Wanna Meet Dave Grohl"	5:02
3.	"Nodding Off" (featuring Best Coast)	3:00
4.	"Poor Lenore"	3:48
5.	"Destroy" (featuring Fucked Up)	3:13
6.	"In the Sand" (live) (bonus track on vinyl, CD and iTunes versions)	2:36
7.	"TV Luv Song" (bonus track on CD version)	1:44
8.	"Mickey Mouse" (bonus track on CD version)	3:52
