= Sweet Valley (music group) =

American hip hop group

- Origin: Los Angeles, California.
- Genres: Electronic; dance; Instrumental Hip-Hop; Plunderphonics
- Years active: 2012-present
- Labels: Roshis Garden, Ghost Ramp, Fool's Gold Records
- Members: Nathan Williams; Joel "Kynan" Williams
- Website: www.sweetvvalley.com

Sweet Valley is an electronic music duo consisting of Wavves member Nathan Williams and his brother, Joel "Kynan" Williams. They originated in Los Angeles, California. The group was formed in 2012 when Nathan asked his brother to create music with him now that they were living in the same home, "or else [Joel] would just be sitting around smoking my weed all day."

== History ==
=== 2012–13: Stay Calm, Eternal Champ, Tour, Jenova, & SV ===
On August 7, 2012, the group released their first project, Stay Calm, through Fool's Gold Records, working with producer John Hill. In September of that year, Sweet Valley released their debut album entitled Eternal Champ, which blended multiple genres and styles through the use of sampling. The album received a score of 6.6 on Pitchfork, who described it as impressive and diverse as a deviation from Wavves. Shortly after the album's release, the group embarked on a tour with Wu-Tang Clan rapper GZA, Killer Mike, and Bear Hands In December 2012, the band released their second full-length album, Jenova, on Fool's Gold Records. They released their third album, SV, in 2013.

=== 2014-15: So Serene, Collaborations, and F.A.N.G. ===
At the beginning of 2014, Sweet Valley released a 27 minute single entitled So Serene. A collaboration album with American rapper DaVinci entitled Ghetto Cuisine was released in April of that year, and a collaboration EP with pop singer MNDR was released in 2015. Both projects were released through Fool's Gold Records. The song Liars with MNDR was used in the 2015 film Entourage. Further collaboration songs with GZA and Soulja Boy were released later that year. Their third album F.A.N.G. was released in 2015.

=== 2018-Present: Further Albums, American Rapstar ===
In 2018, Sweet Valley released Eternal Champ II, their fourth studio album, through Nathan Williams' Ghost Ramp. Sweet Valley composed the soundtrack for the documentary film American Rapstar, which was released in 2020. In 2022, the group self-released two albums, Sopranos S1 and Lament Configuration. Since 2021, Sweet Valley has also released music through Patreon.

== Discography ==
=== Albums ===
List of Studio Albums
| Title | Album details |
|---|---|
| Eternal Champ | Released: 17 September 2012; Label: Fool's Gold; Formats: digital download, vinyl |
| Jenova | Released: 12 December 2012; Label: Fool's Gold; Formats: digital download |
| SV | Released: 11 July 2013; Formats: digital download, vinyl |
| F.A.N.G. | Released: 16 May 2014; Label: Fool's Gold, МИШКА; Formats: digital download |
| Eternal Champ II | Release: 20 April 2018; Label: Ghost Ramp; Formats: digital download, vinyl |
| Sopranos S1 | Release: 5 August 2022; Label: Roshis Garden; Formats: digital download |
| LAMENT CONFIGURATION | Release: 31 October 2022; Label: Roshis Garden; Formats: digital download |

=== Collaboration albums ===
List of Collaboration Albums
| Title | Album details |
|---|---|
| Ghetto Cuisine | Released: 17 April 2014; Label: Fool's Gold; Formats: digital download |
| MNDR: Dance 4 a Dollar | Released: 17 February 2015; Label: Fool's Gold; Formats: digital download, EP |

=== Extended plays ===
List of Extended Plays
| Title | Album details |
|---|---|
| Stay Calm | Released: 7 August 2012; Label: Fool's Gold; Formats: digital download |

=== Singles ===
List of Singles
| Title | Album details |
|---|---|
| So Serene | Released: 10 February 2014; Formats: digital download, vinyl |
| Hermano | Released: 28 November 2016; Formats: digital download |

== Concert tours ==
- 64 Squares with GZA, Killer Mike, & Bear Hands (2012)

== See also ==
- Wavves
- MNDR
