= Scum with Boundaries =

Studio album by The I.L.Y's
- Released: July 16, 2016
- Genre: Experimental rock; art punk; noise pop; progressive rock; garage punk; electronic; grunge
- Length: 38:53
- Label: Self-released

The I.L.Y's chronology
| I've Always Been Good at True Love (2015) | Scum with Boundaries (2016) | Bodyguard (2017) |

Scum with Boundaries is the second studio album by American rock duo The I.L.Y's. The album was released on July 16, 2016, through YouTube and SoundCloud.

== Track listing ==
All tracks are written by Zach Hill and Andy Morin.

| No. | Title | Length |
|---|---|---|
| 1. | "Disastrous Looks" | 3:32 |
| 2. | "Peace and Quiet" | 4:12 |
| 3. | "Stop Yelling in the Museum" | 3:13 |
| 4. | "Starts with a C Ends with a U" | 4:16 |
| 5. | "She's a Genius" | 4:40 |
| 6. | "Hey Mind Reader" | 3:47 |
| 7. | "Doing Things That Artists Do" | 4:03 |
| 8. | "Scum with Boundaries" | 1:23 |
| 9. | "Roll Your Eyes" | 2:52 |
| 10. | "I'm Gonna Have Sex" | 3:30 |
| 11. | "Spiral to Me" | 3:25 |
| Total length: | | 38:53 |

== Personnel ==
The I.L.Y's

- Zach Hill – vocals, drums, keyboards, guitar, production
- Andy Morin – guitar, bass, engineering
