= Say Yes to Love (album) =

Studio album by Perfect Pussy
- Released: March 18, 2014
- Genre: Garage punk; hardcore punk; indie rock; noise rock; punk rock
- Length: 22:56
- Label: Captured Tracks
- Producer: Shaun Sutkus

Say Yes to Love is the only studio album by American punk rock band Perfect Pussy, released on March 18, 2014, through Captured Tracks.

== Composition ==
Say Yes to Love digs into "febrile" noise punk / "ferocious", "peppy and articulate" noise rock, along with "agile" DIY garage punk. It sees the band "revel in their hardcore fury", yielding a "relentlessly noisy" take on the genre. It also works in "visceral, jarring" and "brutal" punk rock. Indie and riot grrrl sounds also appear.

== Critical reception ==
Professional ratings
Aggregate scores
Source	Rating
AnyDecentMusic?	7.8/10
Metacritic	77/100
Review scores
Source	Rating
AllMusic	4/5 stars
The A.V. Club	B−
Consequence of Sound	B
Exclaim!	8/10
NME	8/10
Pitchfork	8.6/10
Q	3/5 stars
Rolling Stone	4/5 stars
Spin	8/10
Uncut	8/10

Jessica Goodman and Ryan Kistobak of The Huffington Post included the album on their list of 2014's best releases, calling it "a 23-minute full-throttle sprint".

== Track listing ==
All tracks are written by Perfect Pussy (Meredith Graves, Ray McAndrew, Garrett Koloski, Greg Ambler and Shaun Sutkus)

No.	Title	Length
1.	"Driver"	2:16
2.	"Bells"	1:41
3.	"Big Stars"	2:19
4.	"Work"	2:08
5.	"Interference Fits"	3:03
6.	"Dig"	1:23
7.	"Advance Upon the Real"	5:04
8.	"VII"	4:35
Total length:		22:56

Note: In addition to the full album, the iTunes version of Say Yes to Love also contains four live tracks from the cassette Say Yes to Live, namely "Bells" and "Advance Upon the Real" from this album and "I" and "III" from I Have Lost All Desire for Feeling.

The version of the album featured on Bandcamp combines "Advance Unpon the Real" with "VII" and adds, as a download exclusive, the band's cover of The Sugarcubes' "A Leash Called Love".
