= Cherry Soda (album) =

Studio album by Wavves
- Released: November 13, 2026
- Recorded: 2026
- Length: 33:11
- Labels: I Surrender; Bose
- Producer: Aaron Rubin

Wavves chronology
| Spun (2025) | Cherry Soda (2026) |

Singles from Cherry Soda
- 1. "Pinesol" Released: September 14, 2026

Cherry Soda is the tenth studio album by American rock band Wavves, released on November 13, 2026, through I Surrender Records and Bose Records.

The album is a reworked version of a previously announced collaborative album between Wavves frontman Nathan Williams and the American rock band Say Anything. The original version was scheduled for release on September 18, 2026, but was subsequently abandoned. Williams instead returned to the studio to complete the project as a solo Wavves album.

== Background ==
In July 2026, Wavves and Say Anything announced Cherry Soda as a collaborative studio album between Wavves' Nathan Williams and Say Anything's Max Bemis. The album was scheduled for release on September 18 through I Surrender Records. Williams said the project was inspired by his interest in Bemis' musical catalog and his desire to make an early-2000s-style emo record.

The original album was produced by Aaron Rubin and was conceived as a ten-song project written by Williams and Bemis.

Their planned first single, "Deathx1k", was released alongside a claymation music video directed by Stephen Coad. A planned second single, "Still Alive", followed in August 2026.

== Reworking ==
In September 2026, the planned collaboration with Say Anything was abandoned following allegations concerning Bemis. Williams subsequently stated that he did not want to be associated with Bemis and announced that he would return to the studio to remake the album himself.

On September 14, Williams announced that the revised version of Cherry Soda would be released as a Wavves album on October 30 through I Surrender Records. The new version removes Bemis from the project and represents Williams' own version of the album.

Williams said that his original intention for the project was to explore what an early-2000s Wavves emo record might sound like, describing the concept as a "mall emo record".

== Music and themes ==
The album's original conception combined Wavves' surf-punk and garage-rock sound with elements of early-2000s emo and pop punk. The collaborative version was described as bringing together Williams' fuzzed-out punk-pop approach with Bemis' emo songwriting.

The rerecorded version represents Williams' solo interpretation of the material. The first single from the revised album, "Pinesol", draws inspiration from true-crime cold cases and marks a thematic departure from Williams' more autobiographical songwriting.

== Singles ==
"Deathx1k" was released in July 2026 as the lead single from the originally planned Wavves and Say Anything collaboration. Its accompanying music video used claymation versions of Williams and Bemis.

"Still Alive" was released in August 2026 as the second single from the original collaborative version. Williams said the song originated from a voice recording he had made at a bar and later developed into a complete song.

"Pinesol" was released on September 14, 2026 as the first single from the rerecorded solo version of Cherry Soda.

== Release ==
The original Cherry Soda collaboration between Wavves and Say Anything was scheduled for September 18, 2026, through I Surrender Records. Following the project's cancellation, the rerecorded Wavves version was initially rescheduled for October 30, 2026, before being delayed to November 13, 2026.

== Track listing ==
All tracks are written by Nathan Williams, with other writers noted.

Cherry Soda track listing
| No. | Title | Writer(s) | Length |
|---|---|---|---|
| 1. | "We Get Around" | | 3:41 |
| 2. | "Pinesol" | | 3:31 |
| 3. | "Layover in Dublin" | | 3:03 |
| 4. | "Keep What Hurts" | | 0:59 |
| 5. | "Gone Away" | | 2:52 |
| 6. | "Another Promise" | | 3:43 |
| 7. | "Cherry Soda" | Ross Traver | 2:47 |
| 8. | "Sell You Hope" | Aaron Rubin | 3:20 |
| 9. | "Still Alive" | | 2:26 |
| 10. | "Dust Bunny" | | 1:20 |
| 11. | "Litterbug" | Rubin; Traver | 3:09 |
| 12. | "The Trots" | | 2:20 |
| Total length: | | | 33:11 |

== Personnel ==
These credits are adapted from Tidal.

- Nathan Williams – guitar (tracks 1–9, 11, 12), vocals (1–3, 5–9, 11, 12), keyboards (2–6, 8–12); bass, drum kit (2–6, 8, 9, 11, 12)
- Aaron Rubin – production, engineering, mixing
- Nick Townsend – mastering
