= Wavvves =

Studio album by Wavves
- Released: February 3, 2009
- Genre: Noise pop, lo-fi
- Length: 36:16
- Label: Fat Possum
- Producer: Nathan Williams

Wavves chronology
Wavves (2008)	Wavvves (2009)	King of the Beach (2010)

Singles from Wavvves
- 1. "Weed Demon"/"Beach Demon" Released: November 10, 2008; 2. "So Bored"/"How Are You?" Released: 2008; 3. "California Goths"/"Here's to the Sun" Released: 2009; 4. "Friends Were Gone" Released: 2009; 5. "To the Dregs" Released: April 7, 2009; 6. "No Hope Kids" Released: June 29, 2009

Professional ratings
Aggregate scores
Source	Rating
Metacritic	68/100
Review scores
Source	Rating
AllMusic	4/5 stars
The A.V. Club	A
Drowned In Sound	7/10
Pitchfork	8.1/10
Rockfeedback	3/5 stars
Rolling Stone	3/5 stars
Spin	4/5 stars
Tiny Mix Tapes	2.5/5 marks

Wavvves is the second album by American band Wavves.

== Track listing ==
All tracks are written by Nathan Williams.

No.	Title	Length
1.	"Rainbow Everywhere"	1:29
2.	"Beach Demon"	3:31
3.	"To the Dregs"	1:56
4.	"Sun Opens My Eyes"	3:20
5.	"Gun in the Sun"	2:33
6.	"So Bored"	3:13
7.	"Goth Girls"	3:13
8.	"No Hope Kids"	2:13
9.	"Weed Demon"	2:38
10.	"California Goths"	2:21
11.	"Summer Goth"	2:05
12.	"Beach Goth"	3:51
13.	"Killr Punx, Scary Demons"	1:57
14.	"Surf Goth"	2:08

Bonus tracks
No.	Title	Length
15.	"Friends Were Gone"	2:15
16.	"How Are You?"	2:46
17.	"I Wanna See You (and Go to the Movies)"	2:13
