= Wavves (album) =

Studio album by Wavves
- Released: September 30, 2008
- Genre: Noise pop, lo-fi
- Length: 28:43 (cassette); 34:08 (LP/CD edition)
- Label: Fuck It Tapes, Woodsist
- Producer: Nathan Williams

Wavves chronology
Wavves (2008)	Wavvves (2009)

Professional ratings
Review scores
Source	Rating
AllMusic	3/5 stars

Wavves is the debut studio album by the American band Wavves. It was originally released on cassette format before being re-released on LP/CD formats.

== Track listing ==
All tracks are written by Nathan Williams.

Cassette edition
No.	Title	Length
1.	"Intro Goth"	1:22
2.	"California Goth"	2:18
3.	"Wavves"	3:08
4.	"Lover"	1:24
5.	"Space Raider"	2:19
6.	"Vermin"	4:07
7.	"Side Yr On"	3:04
8.	"Beach Goth"	2:28
9.	"The Boys Will Love Us"	2:23
10.	"Spaced Rider"	2:02
11.	"Yoked"	2:28
12.	"Teenage Super Party"	1:40
Total length:		28:43

CD/LP Version
No.	Title	Length
1.	"Intro Goth"	1:22
2.	"Loser Year"	2:56
3.	"California Goth"	2:18
4.	"Wavves"	3:08
5.	"Lover"	1:24
6.	"Space Raider"	2:19
7.	"Vermin"	4:07
8.	"Here’s to the Sun"	2:29
9.	"Side Yr On"	3:04
10.	"Beach Goth"	2:28
11.	"The Boys Will Love Us"	2:23
12.	"Spaced Raider"	2:02
13.	"Yoked"	2:28
14.	"Teenage Super Party"	1:40
Total length:		34:08
