= Bodyguard (album) =

Studio album by The I.L.Y's
- Released: May 16, 2017
- Genre: Garage rock; art punk; surf rock; experimental rock
- Length: 32:16
- Label: Castle Face

The I.L.Y's chronology
Scum with Boundaries (2016)	Bodyguard (2017)

Bodyguard is the third studio album by American rock duo The I.L.Y's. The album was released by Castle Face Records on May 16, 2017. It was the band's first album to be released on Castle Face, after two self-released albums, and their first to be pressed on CD and vinyl.

== Background ==
The album was initially announced along with its track-listing and artwork on March 25, 2017. The band later shared a double music video on YouTube for "Gargoyle" and "Bobo". Audio for "I Love You Man" was released on SoundCloud on May 2. The album was released for streaming through iTunes, YouTube and SoundCloud on May 16, with CD and vinyl releases scheduled for June 16.

== Release and reception ==
Stereogum awarded the album the website's "Album of the Week" accolade.

== Track listing ==
All tracks are written by Zach Hill and Andy Morin.

No.	Title	Length
1.	"Wash My Hands Shorty"	3:08
2.	"Well Known People Want to Know"	2:29
3.	"Gargoyle"	2:56
4.	"Quietly Being the Best"	3:01
5.	"49er Lighter"	3:42
6.	"I Love You Man"	3:24
7.	"The Treatment"	3:38
8.	"This Is How It Is Now"	2:50
9.	"Bobo"	3:35
10.	"The Studio"	3:32
Total length:		32:16

== Personnel ==
The I.L.Y's

- Zach Hill – vocals, drums, keyboards, guitar, production
- Andy Morin – guitar, bass, engineering

Additional musicians

- Tristan Tozer – guitar (1)
