= Afraid of Heights (Wavves album) =

Studio album by Wavves
- Released: March 26, 2013
- Genre: Alternative rock; indie rock; pop punk
- Length: 41:59
- Label: Ghost Ramp, Mom + Pop Music, Warner Bros.
- Producer: John Hill

Wavves chronology
| Life Sux (2011) | Afraid of Heights (2013) | No Life for Me (2015) |

Singles from Afraid of Heights
- 1. "Sail to the Sun" Released: December 12, 2012; 2. "Demon to Lean On" Released: January 29, 2013; 3. "Afraid of Heights" Released: March 26, 2013; 4. "That's on Me" Released: June 19, 2013

Afraid of Heights is the fourth studio album by the American surf rock group Wavves. The album was released on March 26, 2013, through Ghost Ramp, Warner Bros. Records and Mom + Pop Music.

== Reception ==
Professional ratings
Aggregate scores
| Source | Rating |
|---|---|
| Metacritic | 70/100 |
Review scores
| Source | Rating |
| AllMusic | 2.5/5 stars |
| The A.V. Club | B+ |
| Blurt | 2/5 stars |
| Consequence of Sound | 3.5/5 stars |
| Exclaim! | 8/10 |
| NME | 7/10 |
| Pitchfork | 7.8/10 |
| Rolling Stone | 4/5 stars |
| Slant Magazine | 2.5/5 stars |
| Spin | 6/10 |

Afraid of Heights received generally favorable reviews upon its release. At Metacritic, which assigns a normalized rating out of 100 to reviews from mainstream critics, the album has received an average score of 70, based on 26 reviews, indicating "generally favorable reviews".

== Personnel ==
- Nathan Williams - vocals, rhythm and lead guitar, baritone guitar, drums (tracks 3, 10, 13), glockenspiel, keyboards
- Stephen Pope - vocals, bass guitar, baritone guitar, rhythm guitar, percussion
- Jorma Vik - drums
- John Hill - production, keyboards, programming

== Track listing ==
All tracks are written by Nathan Williams, except where noted.

| No. | Title | Length |
|---|---|---|
| 1. | "Sail to the Sun" | 3:14 |
| 2. | "Demon to Lean On" | 4:12 |
| 3. | "Mystic" (Williams, Stephen Pope, John Hill) | 2:23 |
| 4. | "Lunge Forward" | 2:48 |
| 5. | "Dog" (Williams, Pope) | 3:10 |
| 6. | "Afraid of Heights" (featuring Jenny Lewis) (Williams, Pope) | 5:06 |
| 7. | "Paranoid" | 2:22 |
| 8. | "Cop" | 1:57 |
| 9. | "Beat Me Up" | 2:20 |
| 10. | "Everything Is My Fault" (Williams, Hill) | 2:38 |
| 11. | "That's on Me" (Williams, Pope) | 3:40 |
| 12. | "Gimme a Knife" | 2:54 |
| 13. | "I Can't Dream" | 5:13 |
| Total length: | | 41:59 |
