= Face Tat =

Studio album by Zach Hill
- Released: October 19, 2010
- Recorded: April 2, 2009 – July 1, 2010
- Genres: Noise rock; noise; experimental; punk jazz; no wave; electronic
- Length: 39:38
- Label: Sargent House
- Producers: Andy Morin, Zach Hill

Zach Hill chronology
Astrological Straits (2008)	Face Tat (2010)	Lil Scuzzy (2011)

Face Tat (stylized in all caps) is the second full-length studio album by American recording artist Zach Hill. It was co-produced by Andy Morin and released on October 19, 2010.

== Artwork ==
The album cover shows a photograph of an angry woman with short black hair wearing a flannel shirt and overalls. She is holding a compressed air can which is spewing flames that she is glaring at. She is stood in front of a row of trees in daytime. There is a narrow plain white border around the image where the name of the album is handwritten in the top-right corner.

The cover image originates from a scene in "The Sacto Smile" music video directed by Zach Hill and Sean Stout. The cover was designed by Andy Morin and Sonny Kay.

The woman appearing in the music video and on the album cover is Liz Liles.

== Reception ==
Professional ratings
Aggregate scores
Source	Rating
Metacritic	74/100
Review scores
Source	Rating
AllMusic	4/5 stars
The A.V. Club	A−
Drowned in Sound	7/10
musicOMH	4/5 stars
Pitchfork	7.5/10
PopMatters	6/10 stars
Tiny Mix Tapes	4/5 stars

Face Tat received positive reviews from critics upon release. On Metacritic, the album holds a score of 74/100 based on 13 reviews, indicating "generally favorable reviews".

== Track listing ==
All lyrics are written by Zach Hill. All songs produced by Hill and Andy Morin.

Face Tat
No.	Title	Writer(s)	Length
1.	"Memo to the Man"	Zach Hill; Greg Saunier; Nick Reinhart	3:42
2.	"The Primitives Talk"	Hill	3:22
3.	"Ex-Ravers"	Hill; Reinhart	3:20
4.	"The Sacto Smile"	Hill; Reinhart; Randy Randall; Dean Spunt	1:58
5.	"Green Bricks"	Hill	2:42
6.	"House of Hits"	Hill; Reinhart	4:54
7.	"Jackers"	Hill	1:33
8.	"Burner in the Video"	Hill; Robby Moncrieff	3:27
9.	"Dizzy from the Twins"	Hill; Reinhart	2:23
10.	"Gross Sales"	Hill; Guillermo Scott Herren	2:48
11.	"Total Recall"	Hill; Randall; Spunt	3:02
12.	"Face Tat"	Hill; Carson McWhirter	3:42
13.	"Second Life"	Hill; Devendra Banhart	2:45
Total length:			39:38

== Personnel ==
- Zach Hill - drums, vocals, keyboards, electronics, bass, recording and mixing
- Andy Morin - keyboards, programming, recording and mixing
- Nick Reinhart - guitar (1, 2, 3, 4, 6, 9)
- Greg Saunier - drums (1)
- Randy Randall - guitar (4, 11)
- Dean Spunt - vocals (4, 11)
- Robby Moncrieff - keyboards, guitar, programming (8)
- Guillermo Scott Herren - programming, electronics (10)
- Carson McWhirter - guitar (12)
- Devendra Banhart - vocals (13)
