= Ghost Ramp =

American record label

Ghost Ramp is an American record label based in Los Angeles. It was founded by Wavves frontman Nathan Williams. The label started as a music blog, later expanding into a record label. It currently has nine artists signed, including Wavves and his side projects, Sweet Valley and Spirit Club.

== History ==
Started in 2008, Ghost Ramp began as a music blog run by Williams. As Williams' band, Wavves, began to gain attention, he put blogging on hold. On August 3, 2010, Wavves released King of the Beach to generally positive reviews. The following year, they released Life Sux on the newly-formed record label, Ghost Ramp. With the successes of both King of the Beach and Life Sux, Williams was able to expand his label. On November 16, 2015, Ghost Ramp released a remastered seven-inch vinyl LP for the video game Drift Stage. On December 1, 2015, Ghost Ramp started a monthly subscription where members are sent a seven-inch vinyl record, an item of apparel, and a Nick Gazin-designed trading card.

== Artists ==
- Antwon
- Birth Defects
- Cloud Nothings
- Fraternal Twin
- Juice Box
- So Stressed
- Spirit Club
- Steep Leans
- Sweet Valley
- Trash Talk
- Wavves
