= Post Acid =

"Post-Acid"

Single by Wavves

from the album King of the Beach
- Released: June 9, 2010
- Recorded: 2010 at Sweet Tea Studios
- Genre: Indie rock; garage punk; surf punk; skate punk; pop punk; power pop; noise pop; psychedelic pop; shitgaze
- Length: 2:11
- Label: Green Label Sound
- Songwriter: Nathan Williams
- Producer: Dennis Herring

Wavves singles chronology
"To The Dregs" (2009)	"Post-Acid" (2010)

"Post-Acid" is the lead single from Wavves' album King of the Beach. It was made available digitally June 9, 2010 by Mountain Dew's label, Green Label Sound. Patrick O' Dell directed a video for the song, featuring an introduction by John Norris and a cameo by skateboarder Kevin Long as an alien. The video premiered on the Green Label Sound website August 26, 2010. The song is also used in the short film Scott Pilgrim vs. The Animation. Pitchfork placed "Post Acid" at number 85 on their Top 100 Tracks of 2010.
