= Wavves =

American rock band

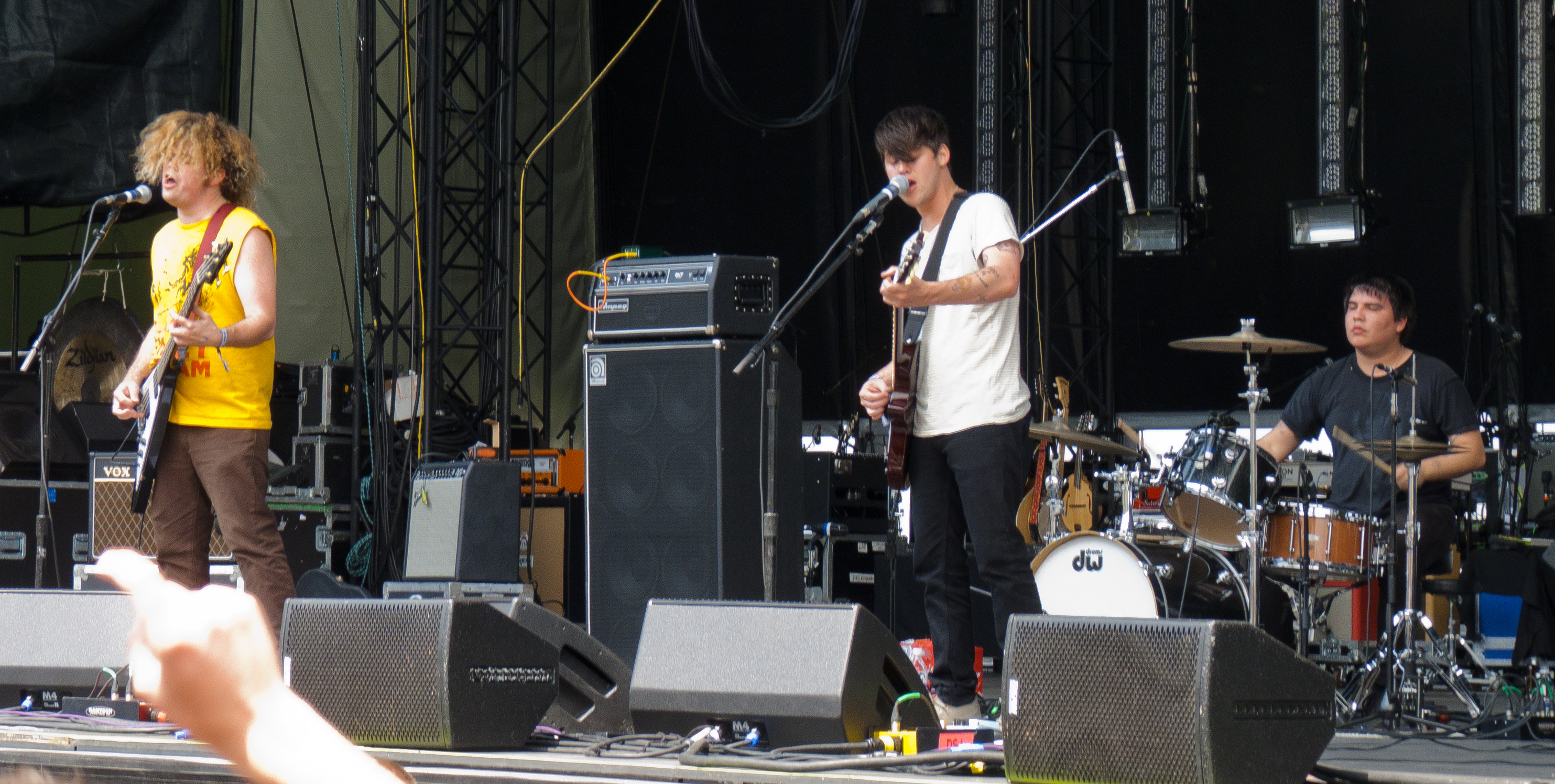
- Wavves performing at Sasquatch in 2011

Background information
- Origin: San Diego, California, U.S.
- Genres: Indie rock; pop-punk; surf rock; lo-fi; noise pop; garage rock
- Years active: 2008–present
- Labels: Bella Union; Ghost Ramp; Mom + Pop Music; Woodsist; Fat Possum; Tic Tac Totally
- Members: Nathan Williams; Stephen Pope; Alex Gates; Ross Traver
- Past members: Brian Hill; Ryan Ulsh; Zach Hill; Billy Hayes; Jacob Cooper
- Website: wavves.net

Wavves is an American rock band based in San Diego, California. Formed in 2008 by singer-songwriter Nathan Williams (born June 12, 1986), the band also features Alex Gates (guitar, backing vocals), Stephen Pope (bass guitar, backing vocals) and Ross Traver (drums and backing vocals).

== History ==
=== Early years, early releases, aborted third album (2008–2009) ===
Wavves started in 2008 as the recording project of Nathan Williams. Wavves released several 7"s as well as a cassette leading up to the first release, Wavves. After gaining recognition, Ryan Ulsh was enlisted as a touring drummer and Wavves embarked on their first US and European tours. Wavves released their self-titled debut album in 2008, subsequently drawing the attention of Pitchfork Media. At the time, the band consisted of Williams on guitar and vocals and Ulsh on drums. Their second full-length album, Wavvves, was released on February 3, 2009, and was well received by outlets like Spin, The A.V. Club, and Pitchfork. At the same time, the band were briefly associated with the 2000s "shitgaze" scene.

Singer Nathan Williams experienced a public breakdown as the band was unable to complete their set at the 2009 Primavera Sound festival in Barcelona. Williams, who admitted he had taken a cocktail of ecstasy and Valium, fought with drummer Ryan Ulsh and insulted the Spanish crowd, who then pelted him with bottles. Apologizing for their performance, Williams admitted the next day that he was addicted to alcohol. As a result, the band cancelled the remainder of their European tour.

After these events, Ulsh quit the band, and Zach Hill replaced him as the drummer of Wavves for the period of mid-late 2009. They would intensely collaborate in this short time, and an entire album's worth of material was recorded, although Williams commented he was not sure if it would be released under Wavves. "Cool Jumper" was the sole single released promoting the album. Williams reported that the album was to be expected towards the end of 2010, but this never materialised. In 2011 Hill commented that the full album had still not been released, and more tracks were self-released by Williams throughout 2011. After 14 years, the album, Babes, was released in full on William's Patreon in late 2023.

=== King of the Beach, Life Sux (2010–2011) ===
Two members formerly of the late Jay Reatard's band, drummer Billy Hayes and bassist Stephen Pope, joined Wavves in November 2009, and they would assist Williams on recording his new album after the tumultuous events earlier in the year. The third Wavves album, titled King of the Beach, was released on August 3, 2010, by Fat Possum Records. It featured the new lineup of Nathan Williams, Billy Hayes, and Stephen Pope. Produced by Grammy-winning producer Dennis Herring at Sweet Tea in Mississippi, the album received generally positive reviews from the likes of Paste Magazine, Dusted Magazine, and The Onion's A.V. Club. The album received an average of 72 out of 100 on Metacritic, based on 26 critics reviews. The album was named the 24th-best album of the year by Spin, and the 50th best album of the year by Pitchfork. The group's single "Post Acid" was featured in a 3-minute and fifty second promotional cartoon called: "Scott Pilgrim vs. the Animation"

Wavves released a new EP, Life Sux, in September 2011. It consisted of eight tracks, including cameos from Bethany Cosentino and Bobb Bruno from Best Coast, as well as Damian Abraham from Fucked Up. The album also contains a live track "In the Sand". Billy Hayes left Wavves in November 2010 and was replaced by Jacob Cooper, formerly of The Mae Shi. This is the first album the band had released on its own label, Ghost Ramp.

In 2011, Wavves made a guest appearance in the short-lived MTV animated series, Good Vibes, performing their songs "King of the Beach," "Bug," and "I Wanna Meet Dave Grohl".

=== Afraid of Heights (2012–2014) ===
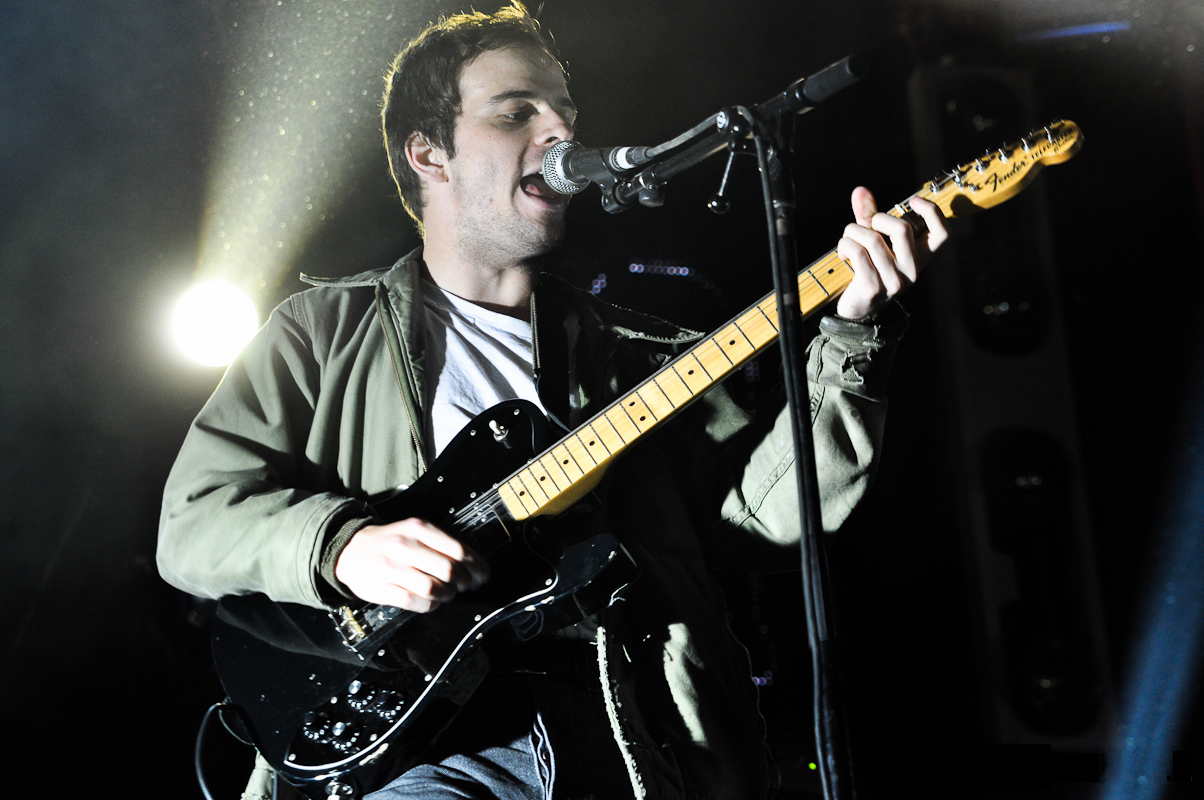
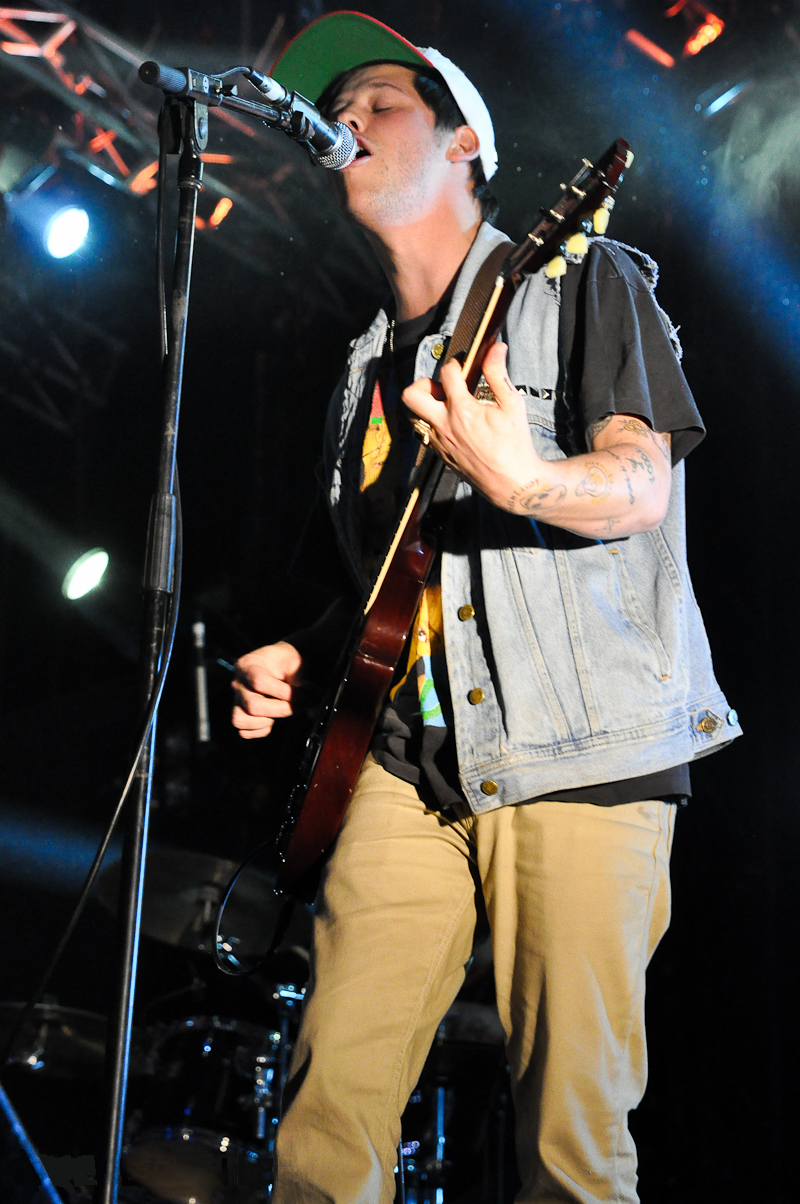
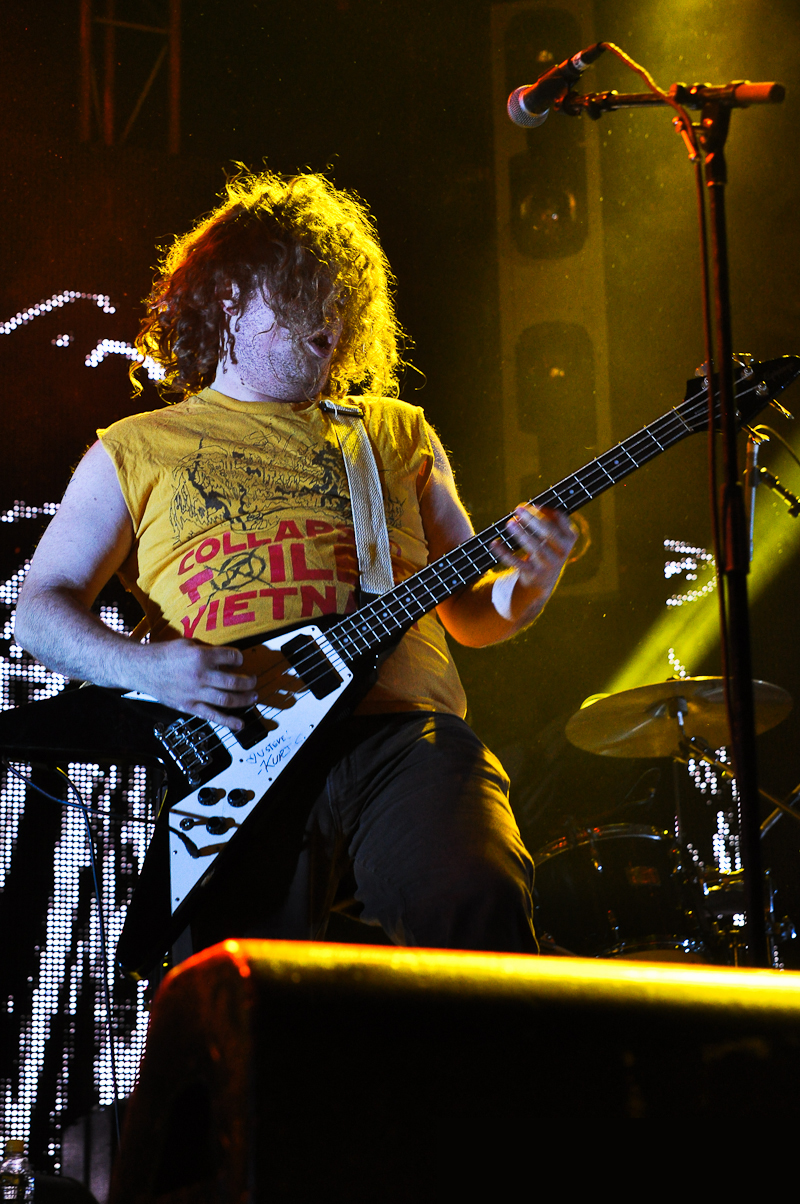
Wavves performing in 2012.

Wavves appeared on Big Boi's Vicious Lies and Dangerous Rumors, on the song "Shoes for Running," which was released December 11, 2012.

On December 12, 2012, Wavves released a music video for their song "Sail to the Sun." Nathan Williams announced the release on his Twitter. Wavves released their fourth studio album, Afraid of Heights, on March 26, 2013, on Mom + Pop Music. The album peaked at #81 on the Billboard 200, the band's highest charting album to date. Still in Rock ranked the album third best of 2013. The second single from the album, "Demon to Lean On", reached #36 on Billboard's Alternative Songs chart. The band also made their network television debut on the Late Show with David Letterman, performing "Demon to Lean On".

As a contribution to the Grand Theft Auto V soundtrack, "Nine Is God" was produced exclusively for the in-game radio station Vinewood Boulevard Radio, 'hosted' by Nathan and Stephen. The band promoted the song by performing it on Conan.

=== No Life For Me and V (2015–2016) ===
In early January 2015, Nathan Williams had announced that Wavves would be releasing both a fifth studio album and a collaboration album with Cloud Nothings during summer of 2015.

In April 2015, Wavves contributed the song "Leave" on Welcome to Los Santos, a collaboration album consisting of musicians featured in Grand Theft Auto V. The album was later added to the soundtrack of the game. Wavves' collaboration album with Cloud Nothings titled No Life for Me was released on June 28 in Europe and was released worldwide the next day through Ghost Ramp.

On July 16, 2015, "Way Too Much", the first single from Wavves' fifth studio album, V, was released. On July 31, "Flamezesz", the second single from the album was released; on August 12, the third single was released, called "Heavy Metal Detox"; on August 31, Wavves released their fourth glimpse into their upcoming album, with "My Head Hurts" via Beats 1 webcast. After a turbulent production, V was released on October 2, 2015, to generally positive reviews. V scored a 6.5 on the music site Pitchfork. The album received a score of 78 on Metacritic, based on 11 reviews, which is the highest score the band has received on the site. Still in Rock ranked it as the 5th best album of 2015.

In December 2015, Wavves announced that they would embark on another North American tour with Best Coast and Cherry Glazerr, titled the Summer is Forever II Tour, in support of V, in February and March 2016.

=== You're Welcome (2017–2021) ===
In late December 2016, Wavves announced via Twitter a new album due on May 19, 2017. The band also performed as an opening act, alongside The Naked and Famous, on Blink-182's 2017 spring tour across the southern United States. The band released the album, titled You're Welcome, early on May 19, 2017, for free streaming. They toured with Dune Rats in Australia in September 2017, and continued on a headlining tour to promote the new album in North America in October.

On December 13, 2018, Nathan Williams posted on his Instagram that Brian Hill was playing his last show with Wavves that night at the Fillmore in San Francisco.

On December 19, 2019, Wavves teased a new record on their Instagram. The band had planned to celebrate the 10-year anniversary of King of The Beach with tours in Australia and North America in spring 2020; however, these were both delayed due to the COVID-19 pandemic and ultimately took place in 2022.

=== Hideaway, Spun and Cherry Soda (2021–present) ===
On March 30, 2021, Wavves released a new single, "Sinking Feeling", which was followed by "Help Is on the Way" on May 4, 2021. On the same day, the band announced on their Instagram page that their seventh studio album Hideaway was set to be released on July 16, 2021. The album, released by Fat Possum Records, received mixed reviews. In 2024, the band teased a new record on their Instagram story. Williams later replied to an Instagram comment to confirm that a new single would be released on January 15 However, the single didn't release on this day. Instead, Williams posted in an Instagram story – which was deleted shortly thereafter – that the first single, "So Long", would be released on February 28, further alleging that he was over 300,000 dollars in debt from the recording process of the album. The band launched a new cannabis brand, Wavvy Supply Co., along with the new single. The album, Spun, was eventually released on August 1, 2025, via Ghost Ramp. It was largely produced by Aaron Rubin, and featured contributions from Blink-182 drummer Travis Barker.

On July 8, 2026, Wavves announced a collaborative album with Say Anything titled Cherry Soda, set for release on September 18. However, after Say Anything frontman Max Bemis was accused of sexual misconduct in August, Nathan Williams announced the album would be scrapped. Shortly after this announcement, Williams changed his mind and announced Cherry Soda would be rewritten and re-recorded as a standalone Wavves album, without Bemis' parts. On September 14, Williams announced that the new version of the album would be released on October 30, before pushing it to November 13.

== Musical style ==
Wavves' style has been described as many different genres including, indie rock, pop-punk, surf rock, lo-fi, noise pop, garage rock, alternative rock, psychedelic rock, grunge, punk rock, and power pop.

== Band members ==
Current members

- Nathan Williams – lead vocals, guitar (2008–present)
- Stephen 'Stevie' Pope – bass guitar, backing vocals (2009–present)
- Alex Gates – guitar, backing vocals (2011–present)
- Ross Traver – drums, backing vocals (2019–present)

Former members

- Ryan Ulsh – drums (2008–2009)
- Zach Hill – drums (2009)
- Billy Hayes – drums, backing vocals (2009–2010)
- Jacob Cooper – drums (2010–2013)
- Brian Hill – drums (2013–2018), backing vocals (2016–2018)

Timeline

== Discography ==
Studio albums

- Wavves (2008)
- Wavvves (2009)
- King of the Beach (2010)
- Afraid of Heights (2013)
- V (2015)
- You're Welcome (2017)
- Hideaway (2021)
- Babes (2023)
- Spun (2025)
- Cherry Soda (2026)

Collaborative studio albums

- No Life for Me (2015) (with Cloud Nothings)
