= King of the Beach (Wavves album) =

Studio album by Wavves
- Released: July 1, 2010
- Recorded: Sweet Tea Studios
- Genres: Indie rock; psychedelic pop; pop punk; surf punk; noise pop
- Length: 36:42
- Labels: Fat Possum (US), Bella Union (UK)
- Producer: Dennis Herring

Wavves chronology
Wavvves (2009)	King of the Beach (2010)	Life Sux (2011)

Singles from King of the Beach
- 1. "Post Acid" Released: June 9, 2010; 2. "King of the Beach" Released: 2010; 3. "Stained Glass (Won't Let Me Into Yr Heart)" Released: January 11, 2011

Professional ratings
Aggregate scores
Source	Rating
Metacritic	72/100
Review scores
Source	Rating
AllMusic	4/5 stars
Consequence of Sound	4/5 stars
Drowned in Sound	8/10
The Guardian	3/5 stars
MusicOMH	4/5 stars
NME	6/10
Pitchfork	8.4/10
Rolling Stone	3.5/5 stars
Spin	4/5 stars
Slant Magazine	2.5/5 stars

King of the Beach is the third studio album by the American band Wavves. It was set to be released in the US by Fat Possum Records and in the UK by Bella Union Records on August 3, 2010, but digital copies became available July 1 as a result of early leaks. Pitchfork placed it at number 50 on its list "The Top 50 Albums of 2010".

The song "Idiot" was featured in the 2011 video game Saints Row: The Third. The title track is featured in the game Tony Hawk's Pro Skater 3 + 4.

== Album cover ==
In interviews, Nathan Williams has stated that the album cover is a cartoon version of Snacks, his pet cat. A photo of Snacks was also featured on the cover of Best Coast's debut album, Crazy For You. Snacks died in February 2022, as confirmed on the band's Instagram page.

== Track listing ==
No.	Title	Writer(s)	Length
1.	"King of the Beach"	Nathan Williams	2:38
2.	"Super Soaker"	Williams	2:29
3.	"Idiot"	Williams	2:50
4.	"When Will You Come"	Williams	2:35
5.	"Post Acid"	Williams; Dennis Herring	2:09
6.	"Take On the World"	Williams	2:42
7.	"Baseball Cards"	Williams	3:02
8.	"Convertible Balloon"	Billy Hayes	2:23
9.	"Green Eyes"	Williams	3:47
10.	"Mickey Mouse"	Williams; Phil Spector; Jeff Barry; Ellie Greenwich	3:53
11.	"Linus Spacehead"	Williams; Stephen Pope	3:14
12.	"Baby Say Goodbye"	Williams; Herring; Hayes	5:11
Total length:			36:42

- "Mickey Mouse" contains samples from "Da Doo Ron Ron" by The Crystals
- The Japanese CD replaces track 10 "Mickey Mouse" with "Mutant", and adds a bonus track "Stained Glass"

== Charts ==
Album

Year	Chart	Position
2010	U.S. Billboard 200	168
2010	Top Heatseekers	3
2010	Independent Albums	28
2010	Tastemakers Albums	10

As of 2011 it has sold 18,563 copies in United States according to Nielsen SoundScan.

== Personnel ==
- Nathan Williams - vocals, guitar, keyboards, additional percussion, drums on "When Will You Come"
- Stephen Pope - bass, baritone guitar, synthesisers
- Billy Hayes - drums, keyboards, vocals on "Baby Say Goodbye"
