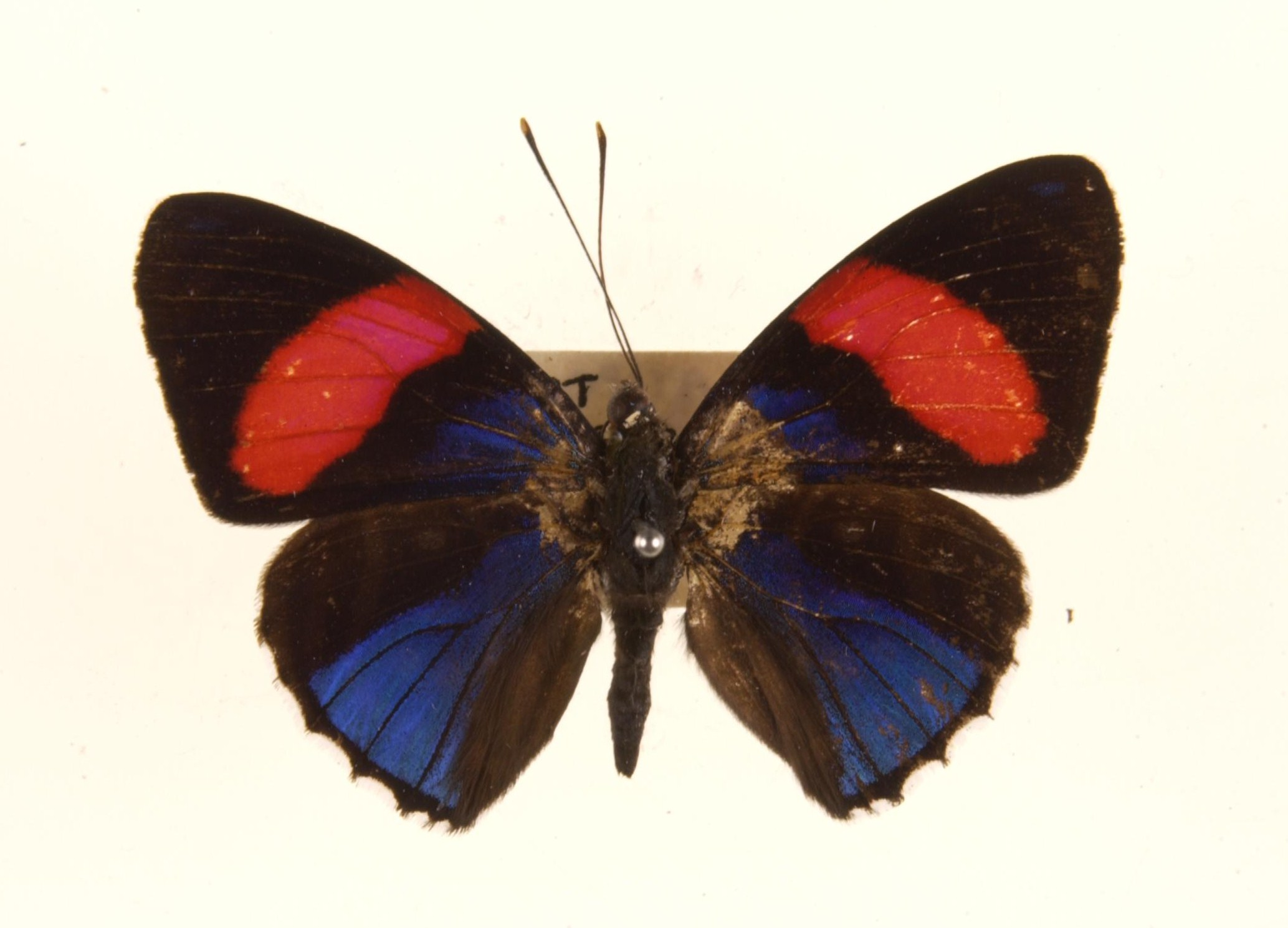
- The Hesperis eighty-eight was described as Catagramma hesperis Guerin-Meneville 1844. Once in this genus under its older broad definition, it was later transferred to Callicore

Scientific classification
- Kingdom: Animalia
- Phylum: Arthropoda
- Clade: Pancrustacea
- Class: Insecta
- Order: Lepidoptera
- Family: Nymphalidae
- Tribe: Callicorini
- Genus: Catagramma; Boisduval, 1836

Species
- See text

= Catagramma =

Genus of butterflies

"Catagramma" is a genus of Neotropical butterflies; the name has a problematic history of differing usage, which especially continues to be used in a broader sense than any modern technical definitions e.g. among butterfly collectors as a form taxon. In that latter broad sense, the various "Catagramma" are popularly known as 88s in reference to patterning on the hindwing undersides which can resemble the number 88. They are medium-sized (around 5 cm (2 in) wingspan) forest dwellers.

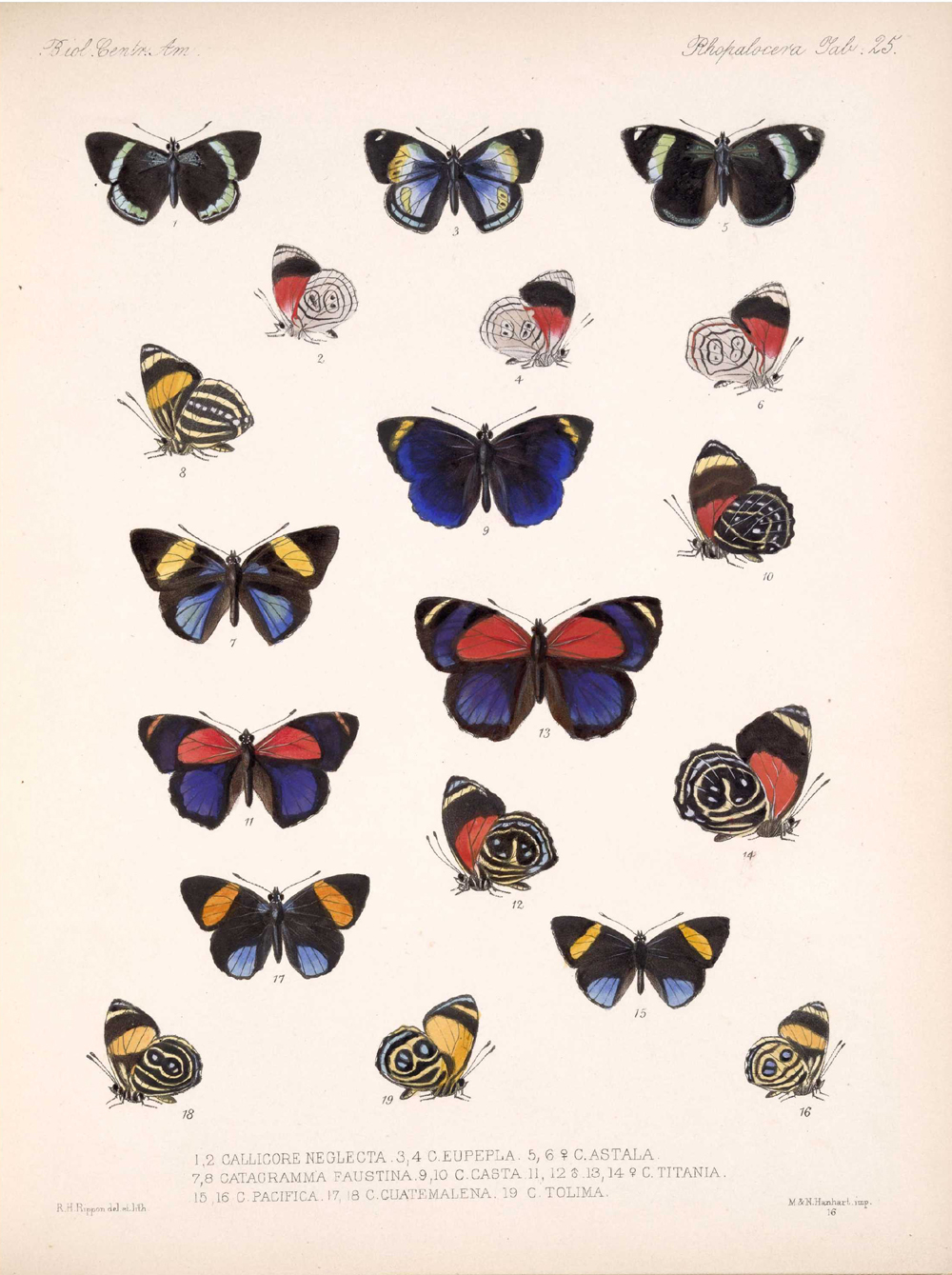
"Catagramma" on plate 25 of Biologia Centrali-Americana

A succession of early studies on the genus led to it containing over 100 species, essentially becoming a "wastebin taxon" associated with what became recognized as the tribe Callicorini in 1952. The former "Catagramma" are now divided amongst several closely related genera such as Callicore, Catacore, Diaethria, and Perisama; while others (like Cyclogramma) are not often considered distinct anymore. These genera have been found to be close relatives of Antigonis and Haematera, together group in Callicorini. The potential association of "Catagramma" with another subsequently described genus Paulogramma has been subject to differing opinion (see below).

Jean Baptiste Boisduval lumped this conspicuous group of Callicorini during his epic Lepidoptera reviews from the 1830s to 1850s. In many cases the generic names of previous authors were ignored, creating numerous junior subjective synonyms throughout, but was widely followed by subsequent sources. For example, the influential works by Hewitson (1857-1861) listed many new species under the genus Catagramma Boisduval, 1836, as later did Godman & Salvin (1879-1901) in their Biologia Centrali-Americana, helping establishing it for posterity.

== Species ==
As of July 2023, the genus contains:

- Catagramma eunomia Hewitson, 1853
- Catagramma hydarnis (Godart, [1824])
- Catagramma hystaspes (Fabricius, 1781)
- Catagramma pygas (Godart, [1824]) (= Godart's Numberwing)
- Catagramma pyracmon (Godart, [1824]) (= Google-eyed Eighty-Eight)
- Catagramma tolima Hewitson, 1852 (= Blue-and-orange Eighty-Eight)

== Nomenclatural complications with "hydaspes" ==
Top three rows: "Catagramma" Top row, center: Underside of C. pygas. From Adalbert Seitz (ed.): Macrolepidoptera of the World (1915)

The type species of the genus is Catagramma hydaspes Boisduval, 1836. This is based on a painted image of a butterfly in lateral view, said in the corresponding figure legend to be from "Bresil" (=Brazil), plausibly based on a specimen in Boisduval's own collection. The image has been taken as the basis for both the genus and species names - attributed to Boisduval (1836), despite that work itself attributing the species name to Fabricius saying "Fab. (non God.)". For some later authors, Boisduval's species was considered part of Callicore, although others treated Catagramma as a valid genus. Much later, Boisduval's species was said to be a junior subjective synonym of Callicore pygas (Godart, [1824]); which had been described earlier by Jean Baptiste Godart as Nymphalis Pygas Godart, [1824] (see Latreille & Godart, 1819-1824). The wording "Fab. (non God.)" by Boisduval may indicate that he did not consider the (re)-description of "Nymphalis hydaspes" Godart, [1824] to match that of Fabricius.

Several years earlier in 1793, Johan Christian Fabricius had given a brief Latin description of "Papilio hydaspes" in his major work (Fabricius 1793: p.54), which was likely the source that Boisduval (1836) referred to. However, Fabricius's (1793) description matches nearly verbatum to the similarly named "Papilio hystaspes" in an earlier description (Fabricius 1781: p.57). This naming confusion was highlighted by Donovan (1824) who provided a detailed re-description and new painted images of what was said to be the original Fabricius specimen from the same source, namely in Bank's collection. However, on re-description Donovan again adopted the latter (and arguably incorrect) name Hydaspes. Subsequently, this same species has been associated back to the earlier name Hystaspes, e.g. as the later combination Callicore hystaspes (Fabricius, 1781), interpreting that of Fabricius (1791) to be a lapsus].

A third description adding to complexities around the name hydaspes was by Drury (1782), from another specimen from Brazil, saying "I received it from the Brazils" (p.19). Although only named in the corresponding index, that reads "Hydaspes. Fab. MSS", hence (as for Boisduval's own usage) giving the source authority for it as Fabricius. However, as deemed a misidentification, Drury's species has instead been subsequently attributed to Drury himself as Papilio hydaspes Drury, 1782, later revised as e.g. Callicore hydaspes (Drury, 1782). In particular, Westwood (1837) [with Drury as posthumous author] reproduced Drury's images under the revised combination Nymphalis (Catagramma) hydaspes. The same work also refers to the re-description of "Nymphalis hydaspes" in the Encyclopédie Méthodique (i.e. Godart, 1824) as being partly based on Drury's work, so noting (p.21) "I have considered it most advisable to retain the name Hydaspes for Drury's insect". More broadly, Westwood (1837) also considers Biblis Hesperia Perty (1833) as the same species, so formalised as a synonym. In contrast, Westwood (1837) clearly states that Drury's species is distinct from that of Fabricius (1793) supporting Donovan (1824). Westwood (1837) also presents the name from Drury (1782) as Papilio (Pleb. rur.) Hydaspes and the synonym Nymphalis Hydaspes from Godart (1824, but cited as Latr. & God. 1819) yet does not conform with Catagramma Hydaspes of Boisduval, nor Donovan (1824) [the latter which, as clarified above, was based entirely on Fabricius - but for which notably Donovan does not use that revised combination of Nymphalis Hydaspes].

More broadly, further complexity about the generic nomenclature were added by description of Paulogramma Dillon, 1948, with the nominated type species as Paulogramma pyracmon (Godart [1824]). That species was originally described as Nymphalis Pyracmon Godart, [1824] just prior to the aforementioned (re-)description of "Nymphalis Hydaspes". Much later, the genus Paulogramma Dillon, 1948 was again re-defined in Freitas et al. (2014), with six species. However, the genus name was disputed by Zhang et al. (2021) who said (on p.35) "we confirm that Paulogramma Dillon, 1948 is a junior subjective synonym of Catagramma Boisduval, 1836" and "Catagramma Boisduval, 1836 (type species Catagramma hydaspes Boisduval, 1836, which is a junior subjective synonym of Nymphalis pygas Godart, [1824])". In essence, the generic boundaries under such revised nomenclature remained the same with six valid species. Zhang et al. (2021) further state (p.35) for their restored "Catagramma Boisduval, 1836" that it "is a prominent genus strongly separated from others in the Callicore group, in agreement with Freitas et al. (2014). However, here also reads that "(type species Catagramma hydaspes Boisduval, 1836, [which] is a junior subjective synonym of Nymphalis pygas Godart, [1824]), but gives no source for any prior authority that discusses nor formalises this synonym. Their statement may however be interpreted as a published formal statement to that same effect, ergo Catagramma hystapes Boisduval, 1836 = Nymphalis pygas Godart, [1824], syn. nov per Zhang et al. (2021).

== Select historical literature in date order ==
Fabricius (1781) gave a brief Latin description (p. 57) as "Hystaspes" under Papilio (hence Papilio hystaspes) as number "254", citing material from "Habitat in Brasilia. Mus. Dom. Banks"

Drury (1782), gave an English description (p. 19-20) and painted image (Pl. XI. figs. 2 & 3), saying "I received it from the Brazils with the preceding. I judge it to be a non-descrit". Later in an appended index he says "IV. 2,3. Hydaspes. Fab. MSS. - - Pl. Rur." [Note: This refers to an unpublished manuscript (=MSS) by Fabricius (=Fab.), plus specifies a "Genus"].

Fabricius (1793) gave a brief Latin description (p. 54) as "Hydaspes" under header Papilio as number "167", citing "Habitat in Brasilia. Mus. Dom. Banks"

Godart [1824] [in Latreille & Godart [1819-1824 Encyclopédie Méthodique Vol. IX] gave a French (re)-description (IX(2), p. 424) as "234. Nymphalis Hydaspes" citing both "Palilio F Hydaspes" per Fabricius (1793), and "Palilio Hydaspes" Drury, indicating from "Brésil".

Donovan (1824) gave an English redescription and painted image (pl. 60 [LX] plus text) under the header Papilio hydaspes [But see contents as "Hydaspes Papilio, Hydaspes Butterfly"]. Cites source as two works by Fabricius. Else writes "A splendid Brazilian species" and "described by Fabricius from a specimen in the Banksian cabinet". Later, it mentions two alternative names used by Fabricius, then refers to "the Fabrician MS. annexed to the drawings of the species in the collection of Mr. Jones." Else says "Our drawings are taken from the specimen in the Banksian cabinet which Fabricius described" and "the drawings of Mr. Jones".

Perty (1833) gave only a painted image and plate legend (Plate 30, figures 4a. b.) referring (in Latin) to the corresponding image as "4 et 4b Biblis Hesperia"

Boisduval (1836) gave only a painted image and plate legend (for Plate 9 [IX], figure 2) referring briefly in French to the corresponding image as "2. Catagramma Hydaspes, Fab. (non God.). Brésil."

Westwood (1837) [As editor, with Drury posthumously] gave English (re)-description (p.20) and painted images (Plate XV, fig. 2, 3) under header of "NYMPHALIS (CATAGRAMMA) HYDASPES" and "Habitat: Brazil". Else, refers to "SUBGENUS: Catagramma, Boisduval." Other previous works are cited. The later page (p.21) details viewpoint on taxonomic confusion.

Hewitson (1857-1861) gave several species descriptions under the recognised genus name Catagramma Boisduval.

Godman & Salvin (1879-1901 [1883]) gave several species descriptions under the recognised genus name Catagramma Boisduval. [i.e. p.257-263: dated Mar. 1883]

== Additional reading ==
- Attal, S & Crosson du Cormier, A (1996) The Genus Perisama (Nymphalidae), Sciences Nat, Venette, 149 p - 65 figs - 12 color plates
- Dillon, L. S. (1948) The Tribe Catagrammini (Lepidoptera: Nymphalidae). Part I. The Genus Catagramma and Allies. Reading Public Museum and Art Gallery Scientific Publications, vii + 1-113, 14 plates.
