= Eunomia (disambiguation) =

Eunomia is one of the Horae, goddesses of Greek mythology. Eunomia may also refer to:

- Eunomia (moth), a moth genus
- The Eunomia family of asteroids (named after the goddess)
  - 15 Eunomia, the largest asteroid in that family
- Eunomia (plant), a genus of plants in the family Brassicaceae
- A fictional computer in SoltyRei; see List of SoltyRei characters#Eunomia

== See also ==
- Callicore eunomia, a nymphalid butterfly species
- Boloria eunomia (formerly Proclossiana eunomia eunomia), scientific names for the bog fritillary butterfly
