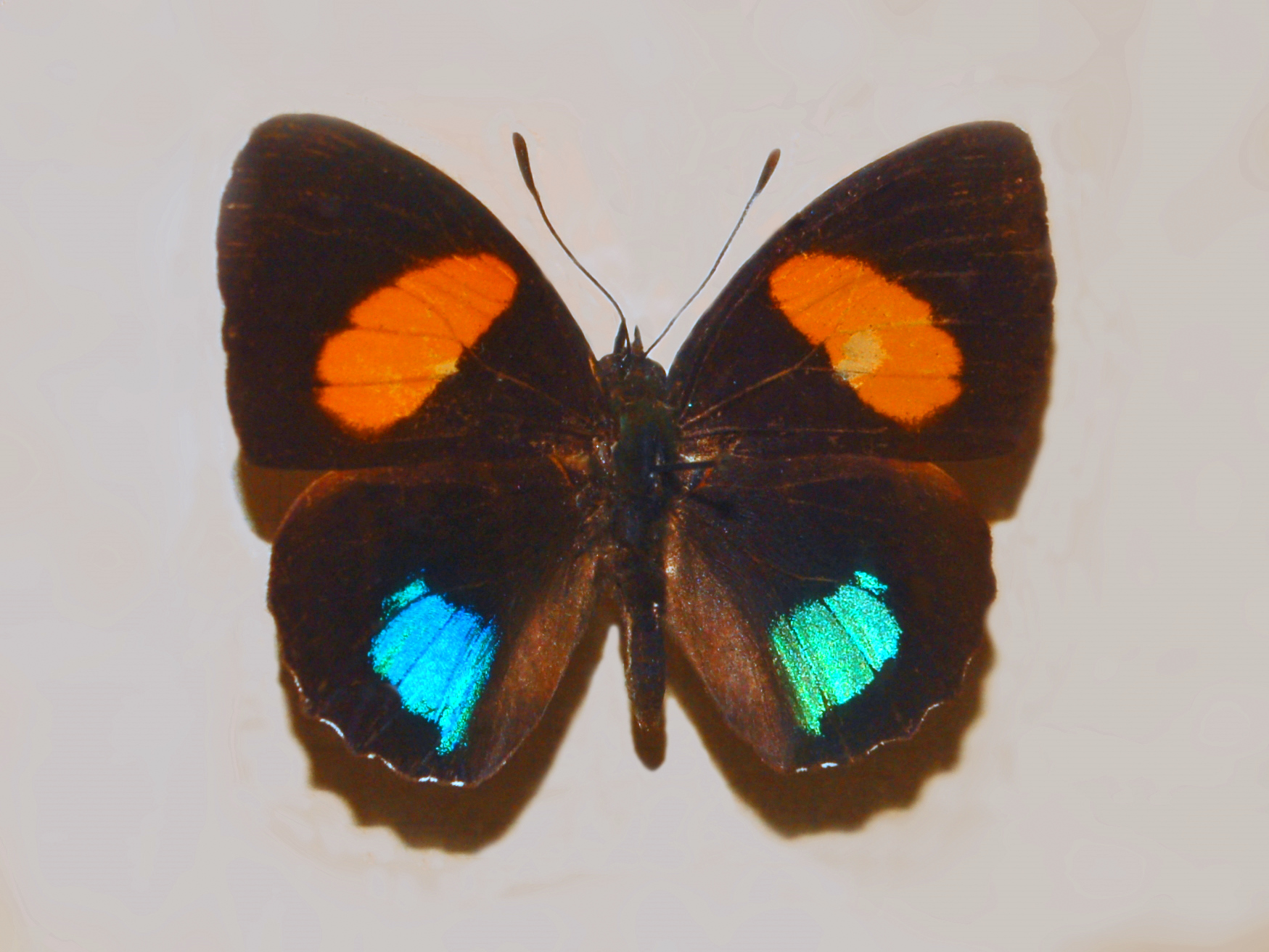
- From Colombia
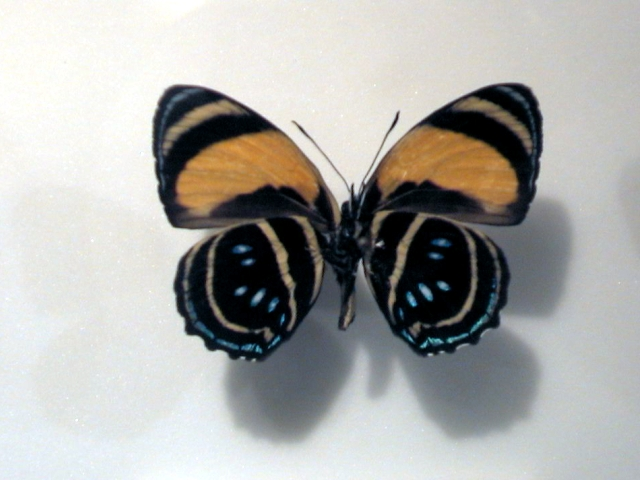
- Ventral view

Scientific classification
- Kingdom: Animalia
- Phylum: Arthropoda
- Clade: Pancrustacea
- Class: Insecta
- Order: Lepidoptera
- Family: Nymphalidae
- Genus: Callicore
- Species: C. mionina

Binomial name
- Callicore mionina (Hewitson, 1855)

Synonyms
- Catagramma lyca mionina Hewitson, 1855; Callicore lyca mionina; Catagramma mionina acreensis Dillon, 1948

= Callicore mionina =

Species of butterfly

Callicore mionina is a species of butterfly in the family Nymphalidae, sometimes considered a subspecies of Callicore lyca as Callicore lyca mionina.

== Distribution ==
The wingspan is approximately 47 mm. The uppersides of the forewings are black with a broad, red median band. The uppersides of the hindwings are also black, with an electric-blue area in the center. The undersides of the forewings are similar to the uppersides but also exhibit a yellow band. The basic color of the undersides of the hindwings is black, featuring six pale blue spots in the middle of a black oval surrounded by concentric yellow bands.

== Distribution ==
This species is found in Colombia.
