= Eighty-eights =

Eighty-eights may refer to brush-footed butterflies in two genera:

- Diaethria, a genus of butterflies collectively known as "the eighty-eights"
- Callicore, a genus with a number of species whose common names also include "eighty-eight"
