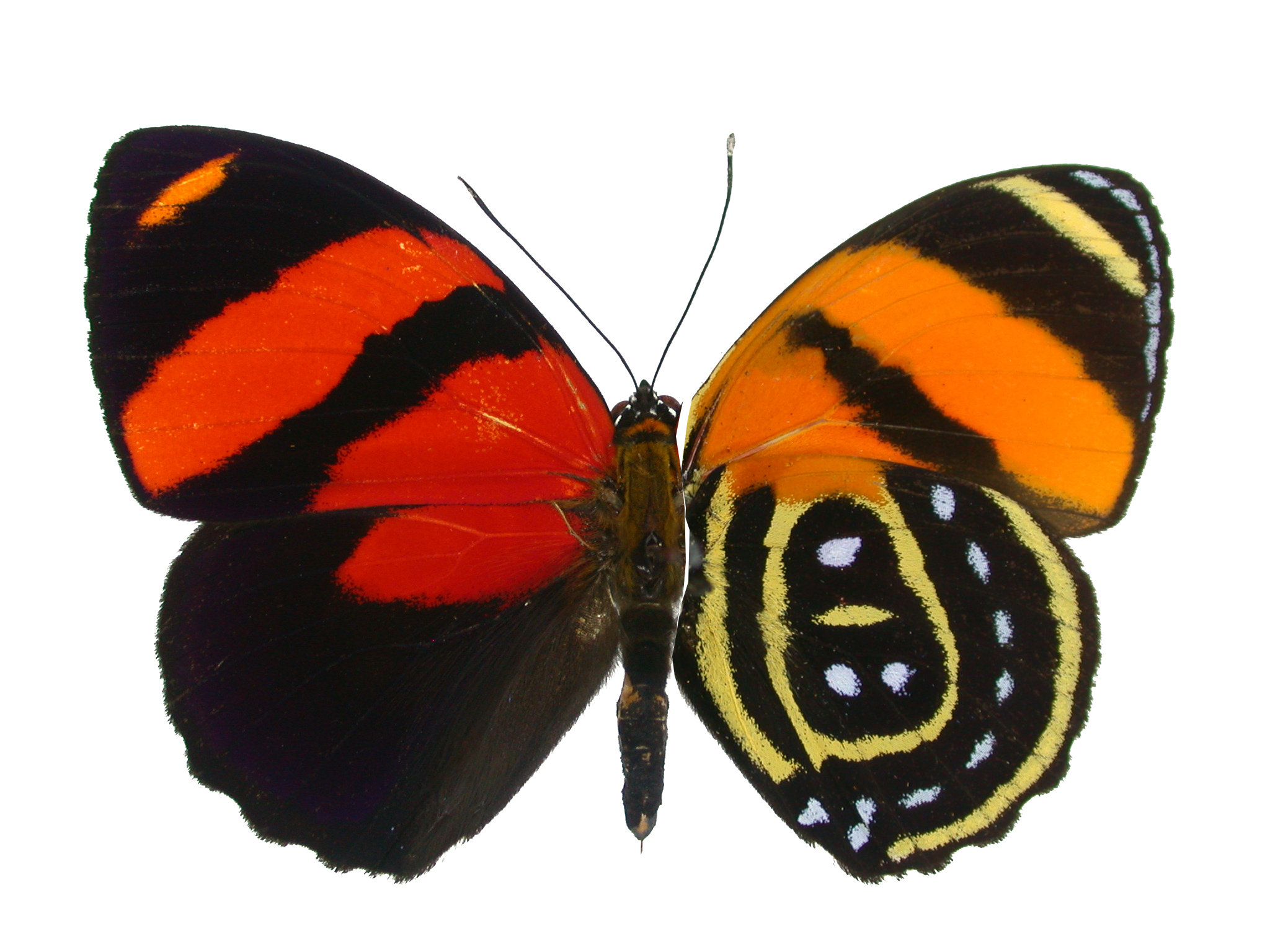

Scientific classification
- Kingdom: Animalia
- Phylum: Arthropoda
- Clade: Pancrustacea
- Class: Insecta
- Order: Lepidoptera
- Family: Nymphalidae
- Genus: Callicore
- Species: C. cynosura

Binomial name
- Callicore cynosura (Doubleday & Hewitson, 1847)

Synonyms
- Catagramma cynosura Doubleday, [1847]; Catagramma cynosura neocles Fruhstorfer, 1916; Catagramma cynosura martini Krüger, 1933

= Callicore cynosura =

Cynosura eighty-eight

Species of butterfly

Callicore cynosura, the BD butterfly or Cynosura eighty-eight, is a species of butterfly of the family Nymphalidae. The common name refers to the markings on the underside of the hindwings, which resemble the letters "B" and "D". It is found in Amazonia, from Colombia to Brazil, and to Peru and Bolivia.

The wingspan is about 47 mm.

The larvae feed on Sapindaceae species.

== Subspecies ==
- Callicore cynosura cynosura (Colombia, Ecuador, Peru, Bolivia, Brazil (Amazonas))
- Callicore cynosura amazona (Bates, 1864) (Brazil (Pará))
- Callicore cynosura fulva (Dillon, 1948) (Brazil (Amazonas))
