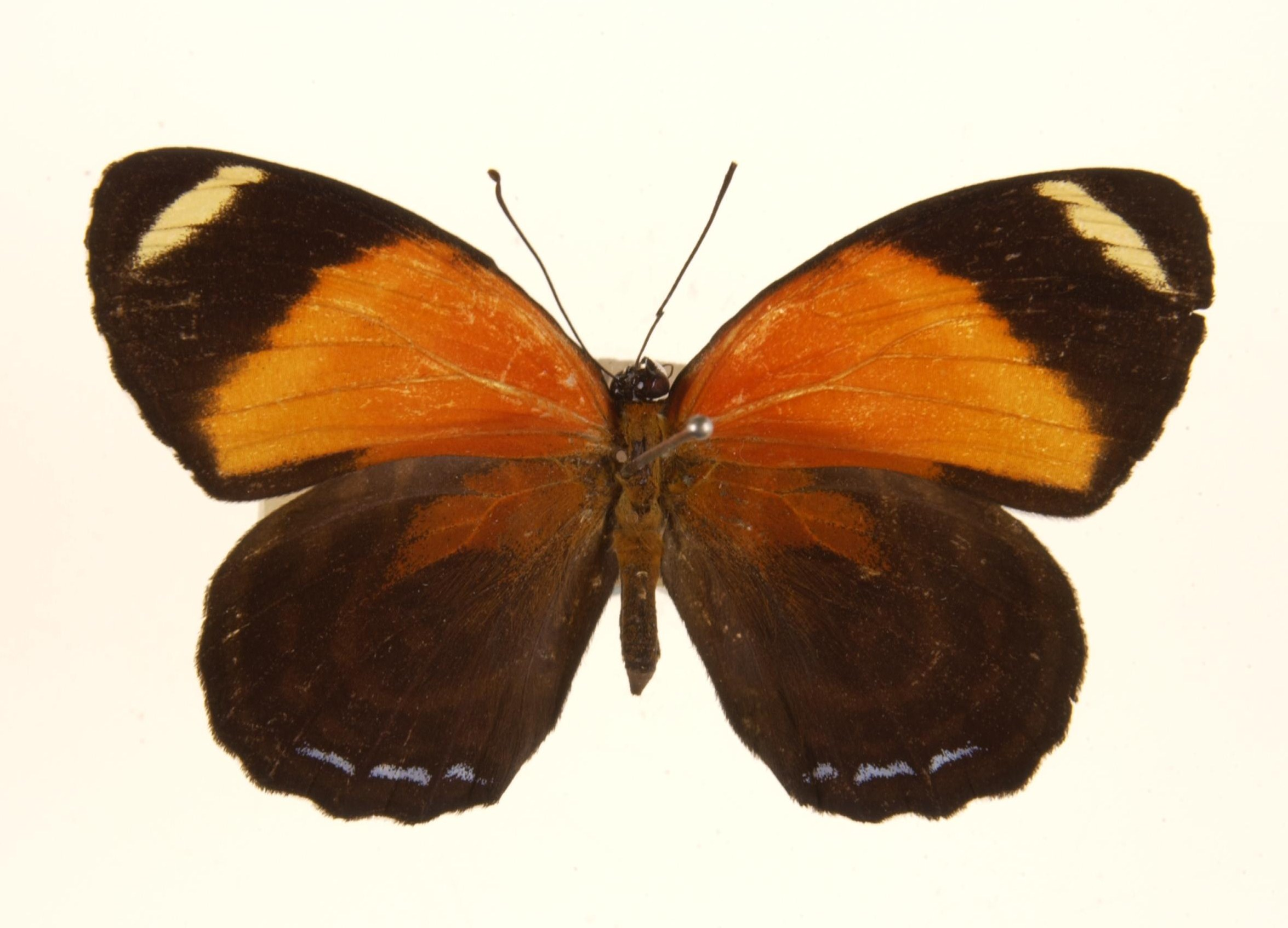

Scientific classification
- Kingdom: Animalia
- Phylum: Arthropoda
- Clade: Pancrustacea
- Class: Insecta
- Order: Lepidoptera
- Family: Nymphalidae
- Genus: Callicore
- Species: C. astarte

Binomial name
- Callicore astarte (Cramer, [1779])

Synonyms
- Papilio astarte Cramer, [1779]; Catagramma sinamara Hewitson, [1855]; Papilio codomannus Fabricius, 1781; Catagramma rutila Godman & Salvin, [1883]; Catagramma sanguinea Oberthür, 1916; Catagramma patelina Hewitson, 1853; Catagramma miles Bates, 1864; Catagramma casta Salvin, 1869; Catagramma selima Guenée, 1872; Catagramma militaris Oberthür, 1879; Catagramma codomannus paulistanus Fruhstorfer, 1916; Catagramma codomannus vindex Fruhstorfer, 1916; Catagramma selima goyazae Dillon, 1948; Catagramma selima reflexa Dillon, 1948; Diaethria dominicana Scott, 1971 (nom. nud.)

= Callicore astarte =

Species of butterfly

Callicore astarte, the Astarte eighty-eight, is a species of butterfly of the family Nymphalidae. It is found from Mexico south to Brazil.

== Subspecies ==
- C. a. astarte (Surinam, French Guiana, Brazil (Pará))
- C. a. codomannus (Fabricius, 1781) (Brazil (Rio de Janeiro))
- C. a. patelina (Hewitson, 1853) (southern Mexico to Costa Rica, Guatemala)
- C. a. stratiotes (C. & R. Felder, 1861) (Brazil (Amazonas))
- C. a. casta (Salvin, 1869) (Mexico)
- C. a. selima (Guénee, 1872) (Brazil (Minas Gerais, São Paulo, Santa Catarina, Goiás, Mato Grosso))
- C. a. antillena (Kaye, 1914) (Trinidad)
- C. a. otheres (Fruhstorfer, 1916) (Colombia)
- C. a. astartoides (Dillon, 1948) (Bolivia)
- C. a. lilliputa (Dillon, 1948) (Colombia)
- C. a. staudingeri (Dillon, 1948) (Venezuela)
- C. a. panamaensis Kariya, 2006
