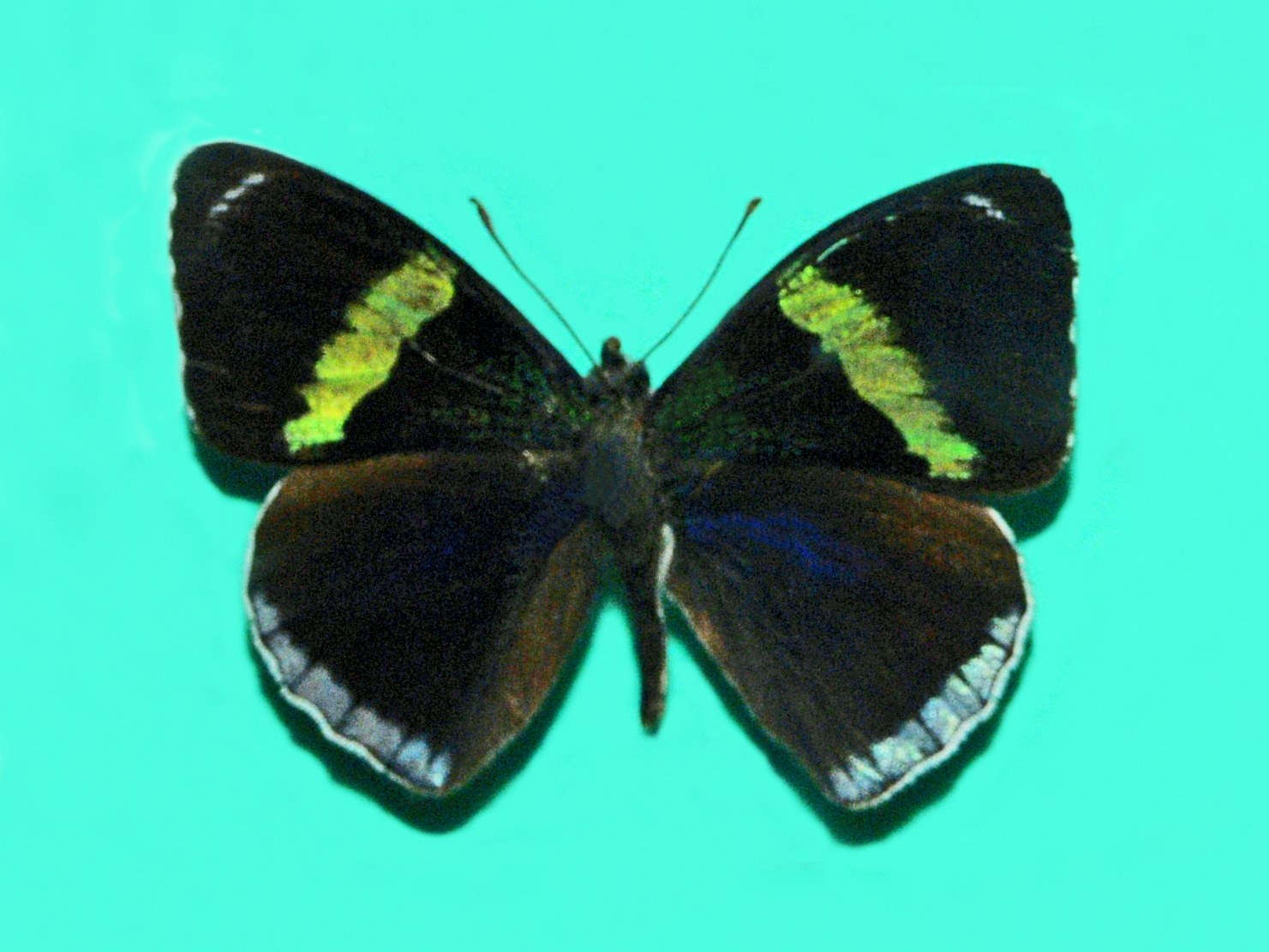
- Dorsal view
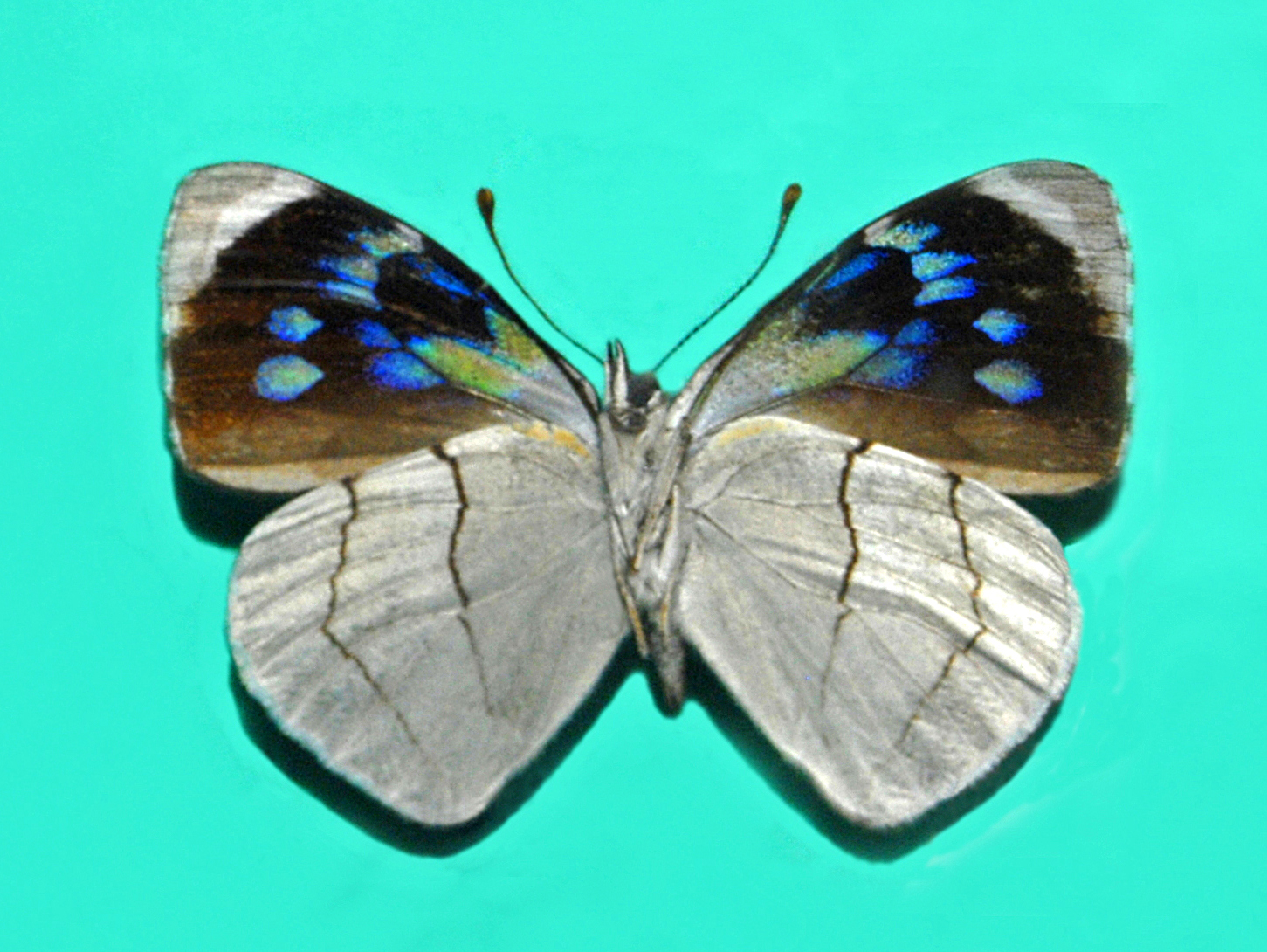
- Ventral view

Scientific classification
- Domain: Eukaryota
- Kingdom: Animalia
- Phylum: Arthropoda
- Class: Insecta
- Order: Lepidoptera
- Family: Nymphalidae
- Genus: Perisama
- Species: P. bomplandii

Binomial name
- Perisama bomplandii (Guérin-Méneville, [1844])

Synonyms
- Catogramma bomplandii Guérin-Méneville, 1844; Perisama mexicana Hoffmann, 1940; Callicore equatorialis Guenée, 1872; Catagramma bourcieri Becker, 1851; Perisama bourcieri Butler, 1873; Perisama bonplandii var. rubrobasalis Rebel, 1901; Perisama albipennis Butler, 1873; Perisama lineata Butler, 1873; Perisama eliodora Dognin, 1887; Perisama aequatorialis arhoda Oberthür, 1916; Perisama aequatorialis var. sinuatolinea Oberthür, 1916; Perisama aequatorialis-arhoda f. ultramarina Oberthür, 1916; Perisama bomplandii velasteguii Lamas, 1995; Perisama bomplandii ultramarina Attal & Crosson, 1996; Perisama bomplandii ultramarina f. dissidens Attal & Crosson, 1996; Perisama bonplandii venezuelana Viette, 1958; Perisama bomplandii reyi Attal & Crosson du Cormier, 2003

= Perisama bomplandii =

Species of butterfly

Perisama bomplandii, or Bomplandi's perisama, is a butterfly belonging to the family Nymphalidae. The species was first described by Félix Édouard Guérin-Méneville in 1844.

== Subspecies ==
- P. b. bomplandii (Colombia, Venezuela)
- P. b. equatorialis (Guénée, 1872) (Ecuador)
- P. b. albipennis Butler, 1873 (Peru, Ecuador)
- P. b. parabomplandii Dognin, 1899 (Colombia)
- P. b. ultramarina Oberthür, 1916 (Ecuador)
- P. b. venezuelana Viette, 1958 (Venezuela)
- P. b. reyi Attal & Crosson du Cormier, 2003 (Venezuela)

== Description ==
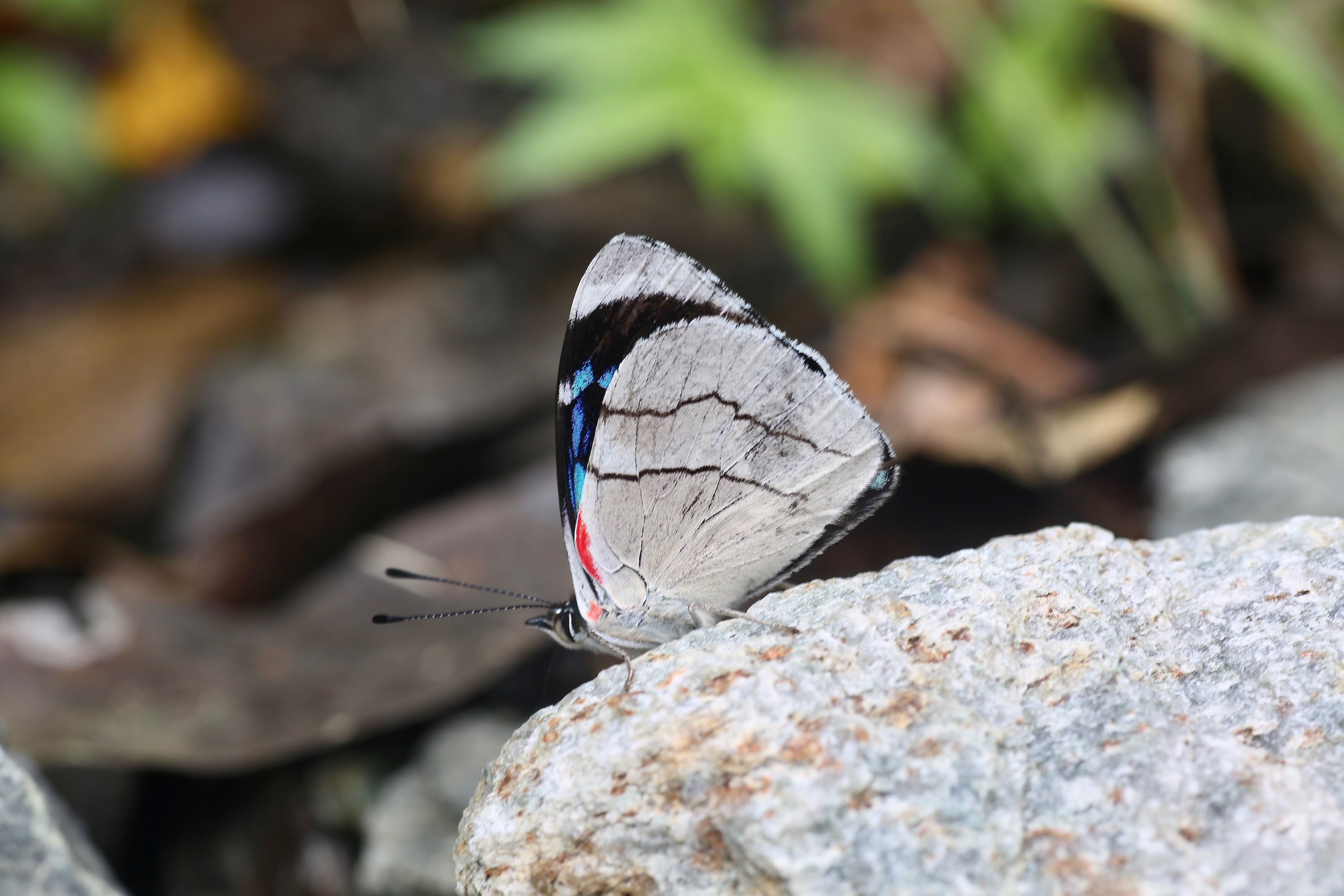
Male Perisama bomplandii ultramarina in Ecuador

The wingspan of Perisama bomplandii is about 45–50 millimetres (1.8–2.0 in). These butterflies are the largest of the genus Perisama.

Coloration and pattern of these butterflies are quite variable depending on subspecies. Usually the uppersides of the wings are blue black. The forewings are crossed obliquely from the costal margin to the inner margin by wide bands of golden green or blue. Close to the apex sometimes there is a small white spot. On the uppersides of the hindwings the outer margins are bordered with greenish or blueish. At the base there is a brilliant blue. The underside of the anterior wings is black, with a row of five blue spots, a brown inner margin and a gray base followed by light blue. The apex and the outer margin are gray. The undersides of the posterior wings are whitish or grayish, crossed by two black lines. Larvae feed on Serjania species.

== Distribution ==
This species can be found in Colombia, Ecuador, Peru and Venezuela.
