= Eunomia colombina =

Scientific classification
- Kingdom: Animalia
- Phylum: Arthropoda
- Clade: Pancrustacea
- Class: Insecta
- Order: Lepidoptera
- Superfamily: Noctuoidea
- Family: Erebidae
- Subfamily: Arctiinae
- Genus: Eunomia
- Species: E. colombina

Binomial name
- Eunomia colombina (Fabricius, 1793)

Synonyms
- Zygaena colombina Fabricius, 1793; Laemocharis fasciatella Ménétriés, 1857

Species of moth

Eunomia colombina is a moth of the subfamily Arctiinae. It was described by Johan Christian Fabricius in 1793. It is found on the Antilles and possibly in Honduras and Brazil.
