= Eunomia latenigra =

Scientific classification
- Kingdom: Animalia
- Phylum: Arthropoda
- Clade: Pancrustacea
- Class: Insecta
- Order: Lepidoptera
- Superfamily: Noctuoidea
- Family: Erebidae
- Subfamily: Arctiinae
- Genus: Eunomia
- Species: E. latenigra

Binomial name
- Eunomia latenigra (Butler, 1876)

Synonyms
- Marissa latenigra Butler, 1876

Species of moth

Eunomia latenigra is a moth of the subfamily Arctiinae. It was described by Arthur Gardiner Butler in 1876. It is found on the Bahamas and in Honduras.
