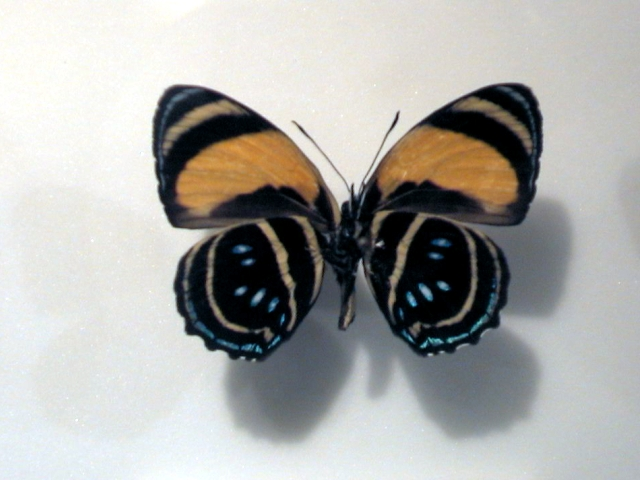
- Subspecies mionina
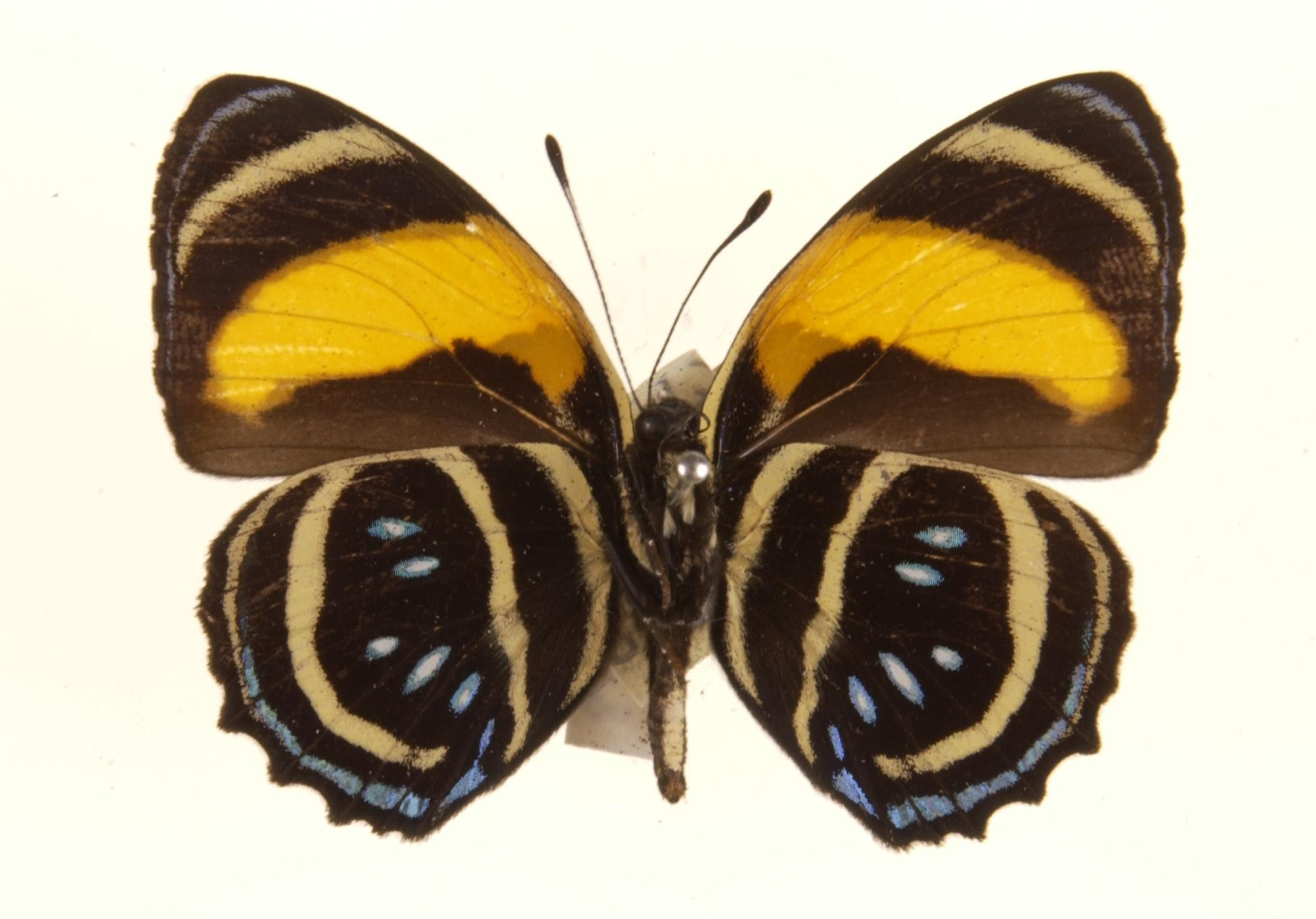
- Subspecies salamis

Scientific classification
- Kingdom: Animalia
- Phylum: Arthropoda
- Clade: Pancrustacea
- Class: Insecta
- Order: Lepidoptera
- Family: Nymphalidae
- Genus: Callicore
- Species: C. lyca

Binomial name
- Callicore lyca (Doubleday, [1847])

Synonyms
- Catagramma lyca Doubleday, [1847]; Catagramma transversa Röber, 1924; Catagramma mionina acreensis Dillon, 1948; Catagramma mengeli Dillon, 1948; Callicore aegina; Catagramma aerias Godman & Salvin, [1883]; Catagramma lyca maroma Fruhstorfer, 1916; Catagramma mionina pauper Hopp, 1922; Catagramma aegina lamprolenis Röber, 1924

= Callicore lyca =

Aegina numberwing

Species of butterfly

Callicore lyca, the Aegina numberwing, is a butterfly of the family Nymphalidae. It is usually found from south Mexico to all of Peru.

== Subspecies ==
The following subspecies are recognised:

- C. l. lyca in Mexico
- C. l. mionina (Hewitson, 1855) in Colombia
- C. l. aegina (C. & R. Felder, 1861) in southern Peru – Aegina numberwing or Aegina beauty
- C. l. salamis (C. & R. Felder, 1862)
- C. l. aerias (Godman & Salvin, 1883) in Guatemala, Nicaragua, Costa Rica, Panama
- C. l. mena (Staudinger, 1886) in Peru
- C. l. odilia (Oberthür, 1916) in Colombia
- C. l. exultans (Fruhstorfer, 1916) in Bolivia
- C. l. bella (Röber, 1924) in Colombia
- C. l. sticheli (Dillon, 1948) in Colombia
