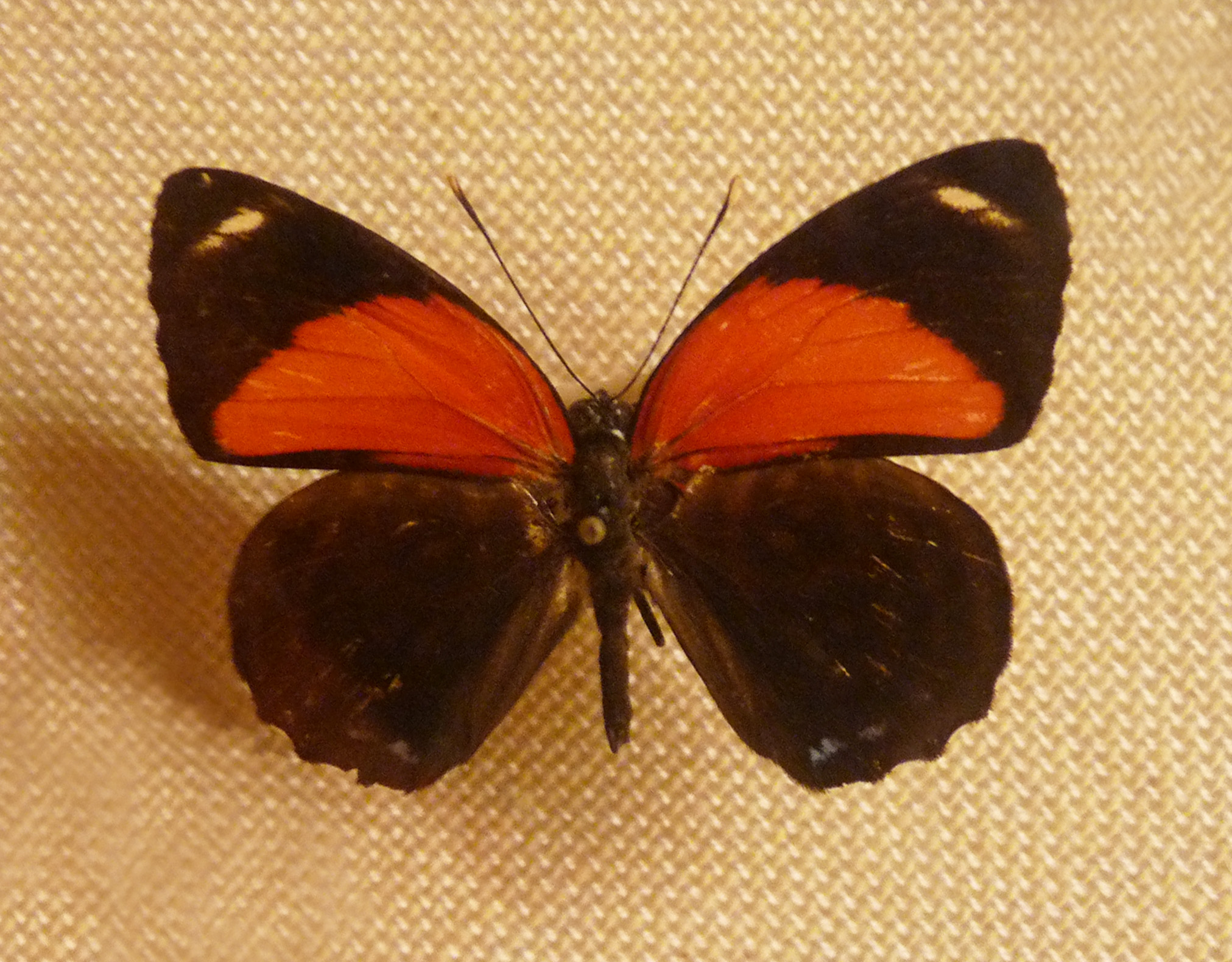

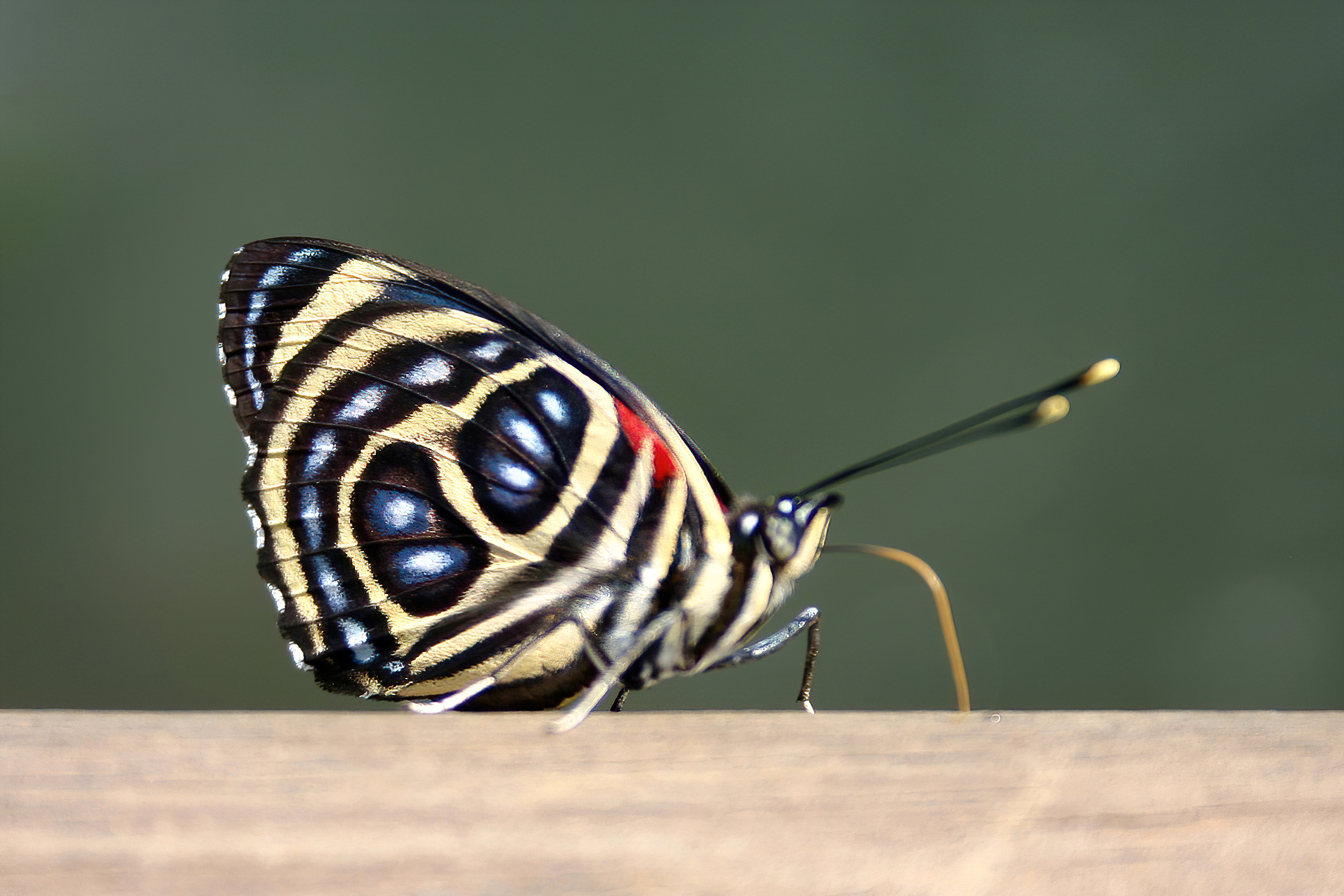

Scientific classification
- Domain: Eukaryota
- Kingdom: Animalia
- Phylum: Arthropoda
- Class: Insecta
- Order: Lepidoptera
- Family: Nymphalidae
- Genus: Catagramma
- Species: C. pygas

Binomial name
- Catagramma pygas (Godart, [1824])

Synonyms
- Nymphalis pygas Godart, [1824]; Callicore pygas (Godart, [1824]); Catagramma pygas ophis Fruhstorfer, 1916; Catagramma pygas paragrias Fruhstorfer, 1916; Catagramma splendens Oberthür, 1916; Catagramma splendens coerulea Talbot, 1928; Catagramma pygas typhla Röber, 1915; Catagramma cyllene aurantiaca Oberthür, 1916; Catagramma pygas agrianes Fruhstorfer, 1916; Catagramma philomena Oberthür, 1916; Catagramma cyllene madeirensis Dillon, 1948

= Catagramma pygas =

Godart's numberwing

Species of butterfly

Catagramma pygas, the Godart's numberwing or pygas eighty-eight, is a species of butterfly of the family Nymphalidae. It is found in Venezuela, Guyana, Ecuador, Peru, Bolivia, Paraguay and the upper Amazonian region of Brazil.

== Description ==
The wingspan is about 45 mm. Its common name refers to the black and white patterns on the undersides of its hindwings that resemble the number "88". Similar "eighty-eight" patterns are found in other species of the genus and related genera such as Diaethria and Perisama.

C. p. thamyras Iguazu Falls, Brazil

== Subspecies ==
- C. p. aphidna Hewitson, 1869 - Venezuela
- C. p. concolor Talbot, 1928 - Brazil (Mato Grosso), Paraguay)
- C. p. cyllene Doubleday, [1847] - Ecuador, Bolivia, Peru
- C. p. eucale Fruhstorfer, 1916 - Brazil (Santa Catarina, Rio Grande do Sul)
- C. p. lalannensis Brévignon, 1995 - French Guiana
- C. p. pygas (Godart, [1824]) - Brazil (Bahia)
- C. p. rondoni Ribeiro, 1931 - Brazil (Rondônia)
- C. p. thamyras Ménétriés, 1857 - Brazil (Minas Gerais, Mato Grosso), Paraguay, Argentina
