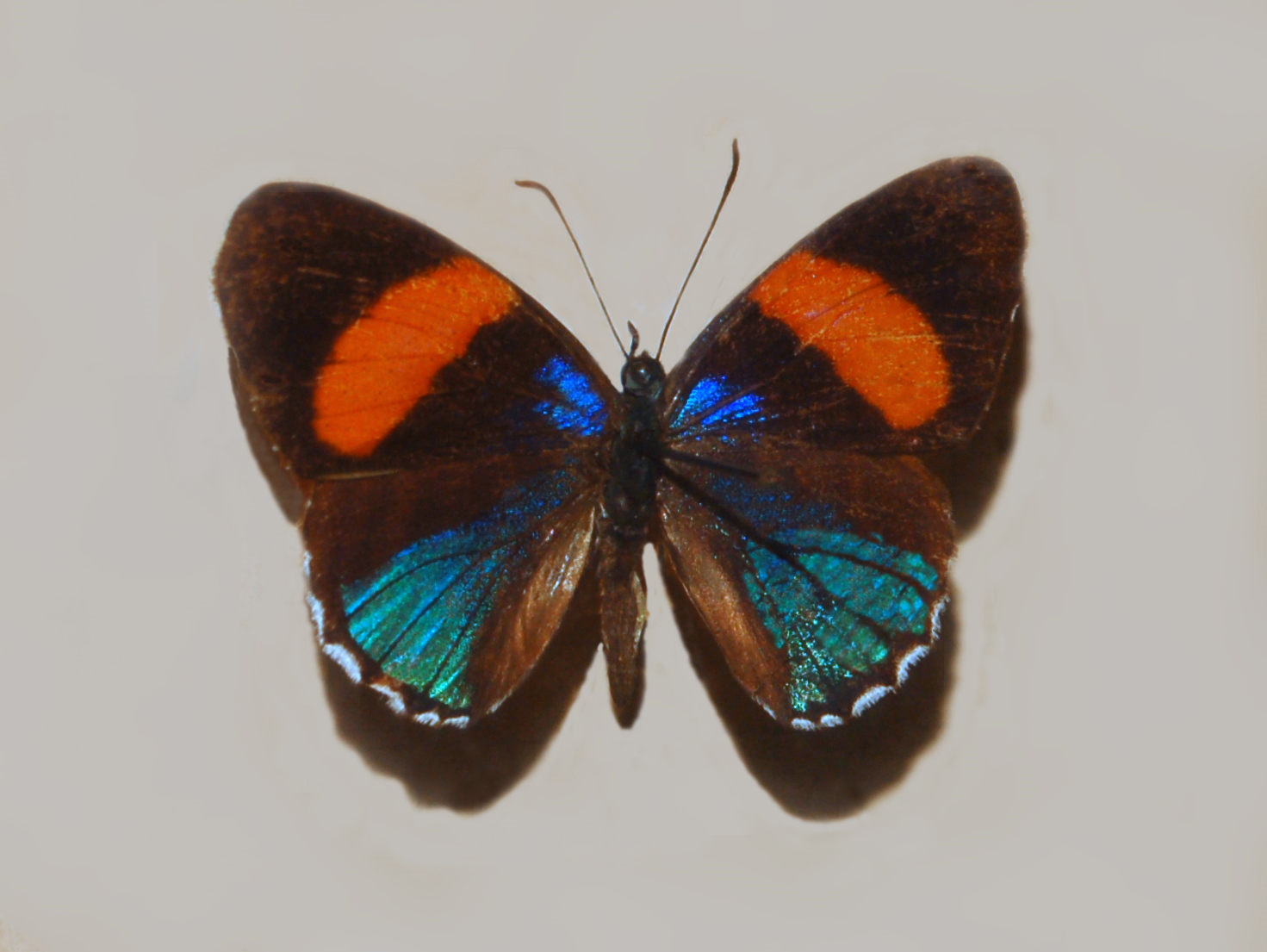
- From Peru
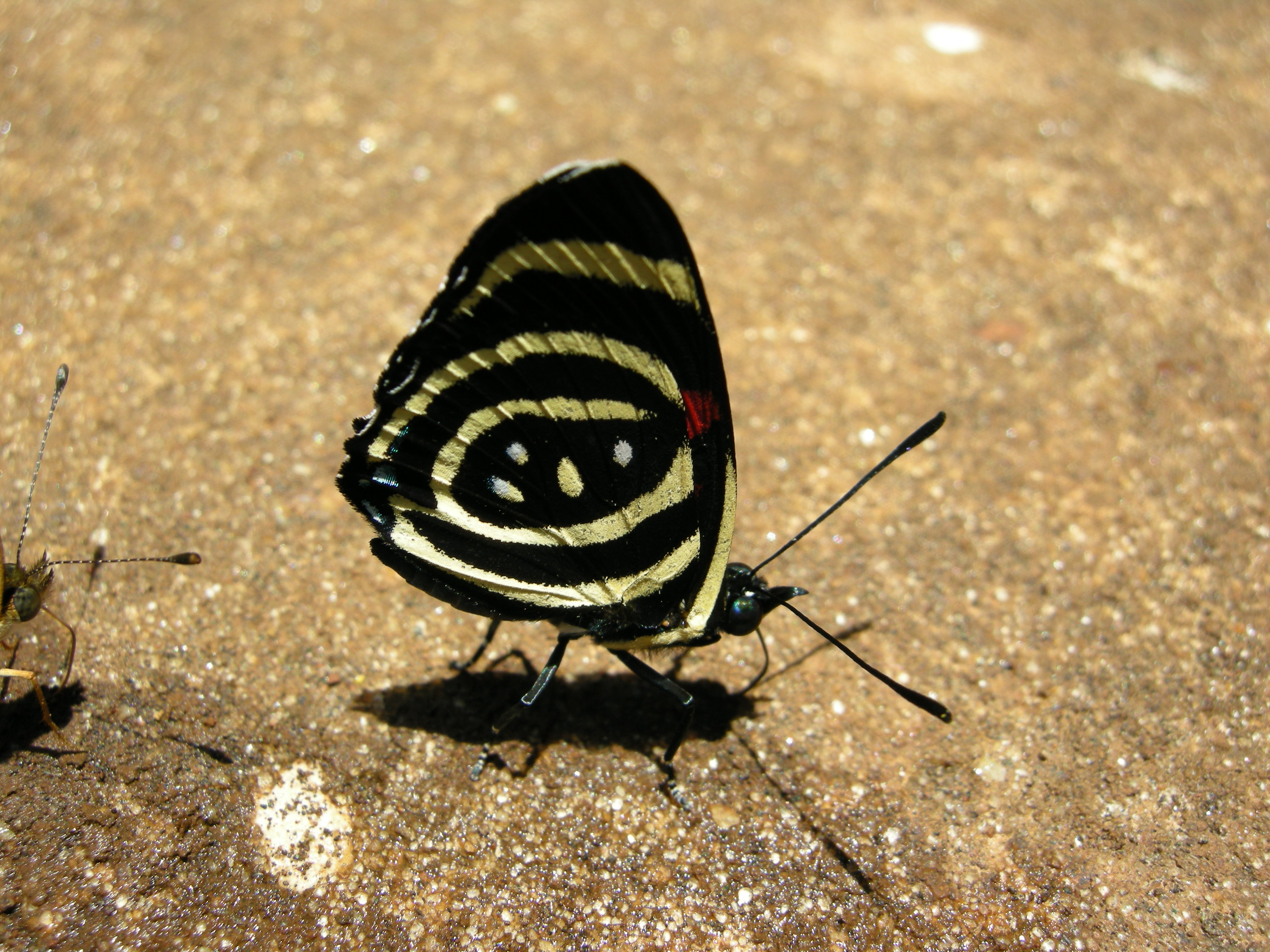
- Lateral view

Scientific classification
- Kingdom: Animalia
- Phylum: Arthropoda
- Clade: Pancrustacea
- Class: Insecta
- Order: Lepidoptera
- Family: Nymphalidae
- Genus: Callicore
- Species: C. hydaspes

Binomial name
- Callicore hydaspes (Drury, 1782)

Synonyms
- Papilio hydaspes Drury, 1782; Hesperia heraclitus Fabricius, 1793; Callicore lyrophila Hübner, 1823; Biblis hesperia Perty, 1833; Catagramma hydaspes delmas Fruhstorfer, 1916; Catagramma hydaspes aiaces Fruhstorfer, 1916; Catagramma hydaspes peregrinata Dillon, 1948; Catagramma hydaspes dubiosa Dillon, 1948

= Callicore hydaspes =

Hydaspes eighty-eight

Species of butterfly

Callicore hydaspes, the Hydaspes eighty-eight or little callicore, is a species of butterfly of the family Nymphalidae.

== Description ==
The wingspan is 30 to 35 millimetres (1.2 to 1.4 in). The uppersides of the forewings are black with a broad red median band and a blue basal area. Also the uppersides of the hindwings are black, while the electric-blue area is larger and extended up to the edges. The undersides of the forewings are similar to uppersides but show also a yellow band. The basic colour of the undersides of the hindwings is black, with four pale blue or yellow spots in the middle of a black oval surrounded by concentric yellow bands.

== Distribution ==
This species is found in Brazil (Rio de Janeiro, Piauí, Rio Grande do Sul, São Paulo), Paraguay, Peru and Argentina. It is mainly present in humid forests and in edges.
