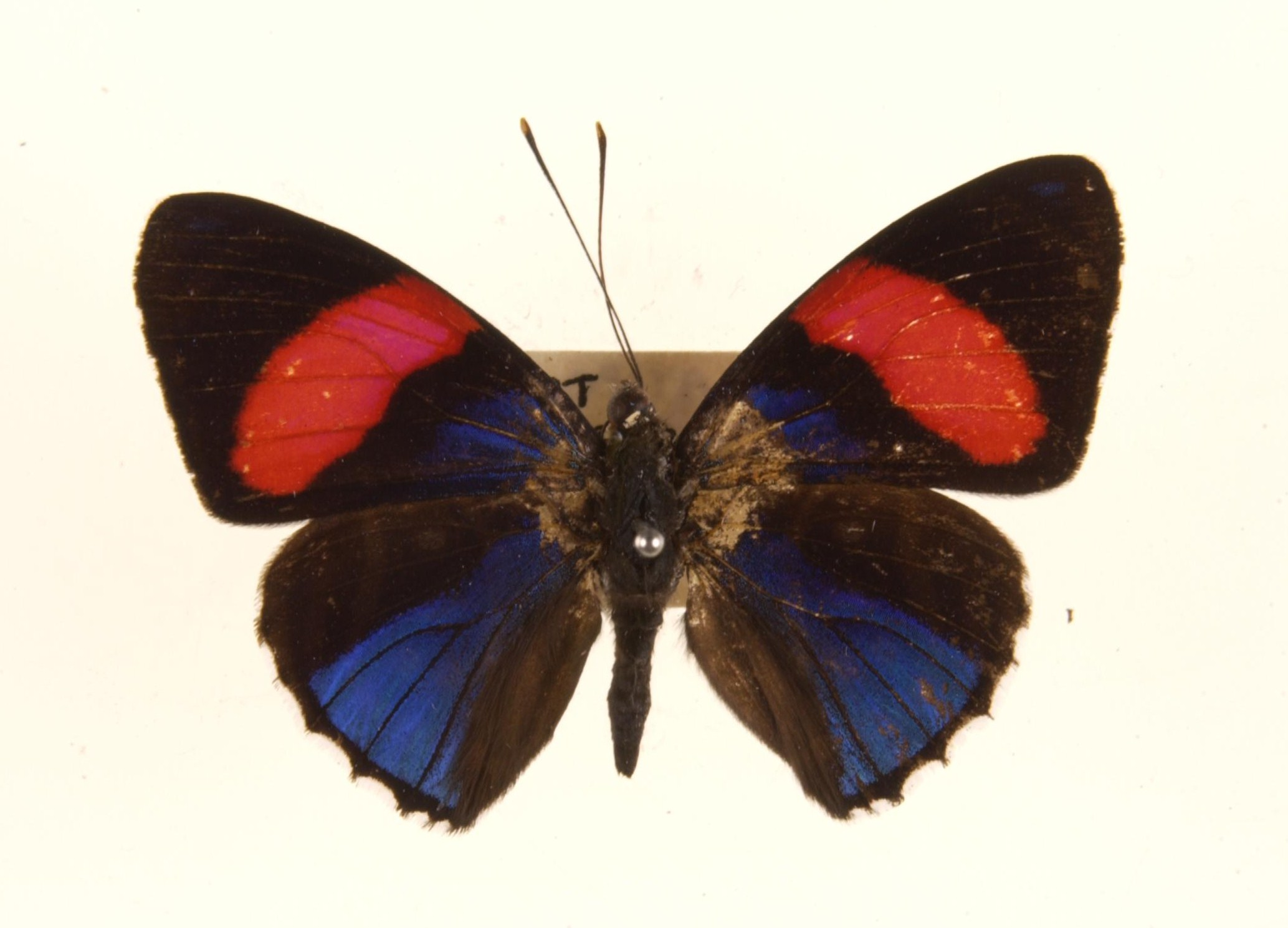
- Hesperis eighty-eight (C. hesperis) upperside of museum specimen
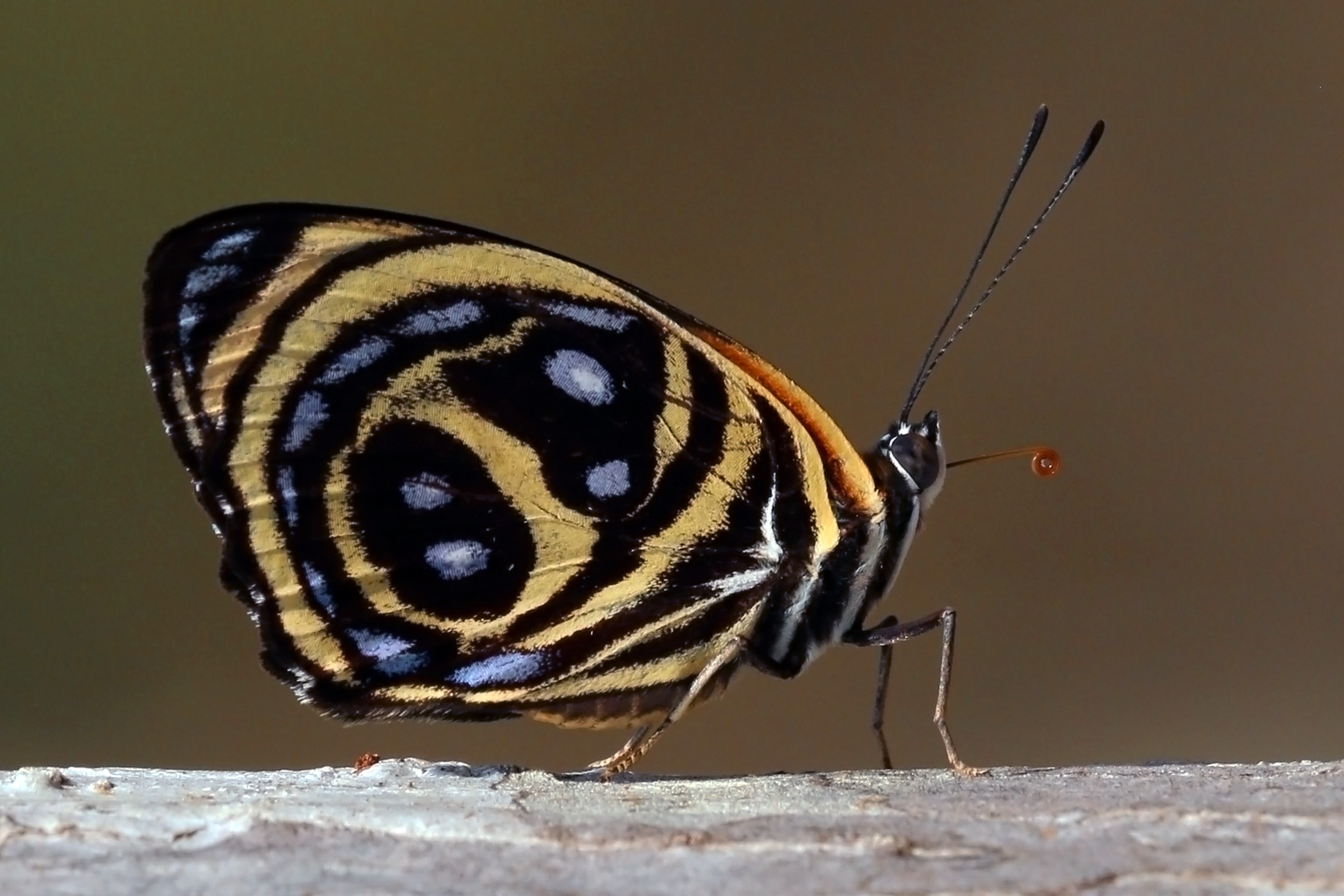
- Texa eighty-eight (C. texa) underside, Cristalino River, Southern Amazon, Brazil

Scientific classification
- Kingdom: Animalia
- Phylum: Arthropoda
- Clade: Pancrustacea
- Class: Insecta
- Order: Lepidoptera
- Family: Nymphalidae
- Subfamily: Biblidinae
- Tribe: Callicorini
- Genus: Callicore; Hübner, [1819]

Type species
- Callicore astarte Cramer, [1779]

Diversity
- See text

Synonyms
- Catagramma Boisduval, 1836

= Callicore =

Genus of brush-footed butterflies

Callicore is a genus of nymphalid butterfly found in the Neotropical realm. This genus, like some related ones, was formerly lumped together as the paraphyletic Catagramma assemblage.

Species in this genus are commonly called eighty-eights or numberwings like the related genera Diaethria and Perisama, in reference to the characteristic patterns on the hindwing undersides of many. In Callicore, the pattern consists of bluish dots surrounded by black and looks more like "αB" or "8°", though some members of this genus have a completely different arrangement of dots. The forewing undersides vary little between species, being black with one or two broad orange-yellow bands in the basal part and one thin and one very faint yellowish band near the apex.

C. hydarnis is listed as an endangered species in Minas Gerais, Brazil.

== Species ==
Listed alphabetically within species groups:

The atacama species group:

- Callicore atacama (Hewitson, 1852) – yellow-banded eighty-eight
- Callicore felderi (Hewitson, 1864) – 8-spot numberwing
- Callicore hesperis (Guérin, 1844) – hesperis eighty-eight

The cyllene species group: [see Catagramma]

The cynosura species group:

- Callicore astarte (Cramer, 1779) – Astarte eighty-eight
- Callicore cynosura (Doubleday & Hewitson, 1847) – Cynosura eighty-eight
- Callicore excelsior (Hewitson, 1857) – excelsior eighty-eight or superb numberwing
- Callicore ines (Hopp, 1922)
- Callicore sorana (Godart, 1832) – Sorana eighty-eight

The hydarnis species group: [see Catagramma]

The hydaspes species group: [part See Catagramma]

- Callicore brome (Doyère, [1840]) – four-spotted eighty-eight
- Callicore lyca (Doubleday, [1847]) – Aegina numberwing
- Callicore maronensis (Oberthür, 1916)

The pitheas species group:

- Callicore cyclops (Staudinger, 1891)
- Callicore pitheas (Latreille, 1811) – two-eyed eighty-eight

The texa species group:

- Callicore texa (Hewitson, 1854) – Texa eighty-eight

The tolima species group: [see Catagramma]

Else: See Catagramma for:

- Callicore pygas (Godart, [1824]) – pygas eighty-eight (from cyllene)
- Callicore eunomia (Hewitson, 1853) – Eunomia eighty-eight (from tolima)
- Callicore hystaspes (Fabricius, 1781) – Hystaspes eighty-eight (from tolima)
- Callicore tolima (Hewitson, 1851) – blue-and-orange eighty-eight (from tolima)
- Callicore hydarnis (Godart, [1824]) (from hydarnis)
- Callicore hydaspes (Drury, 1782) – Hydaspes eighty-eight (from hydaspes)

== Gallery ==
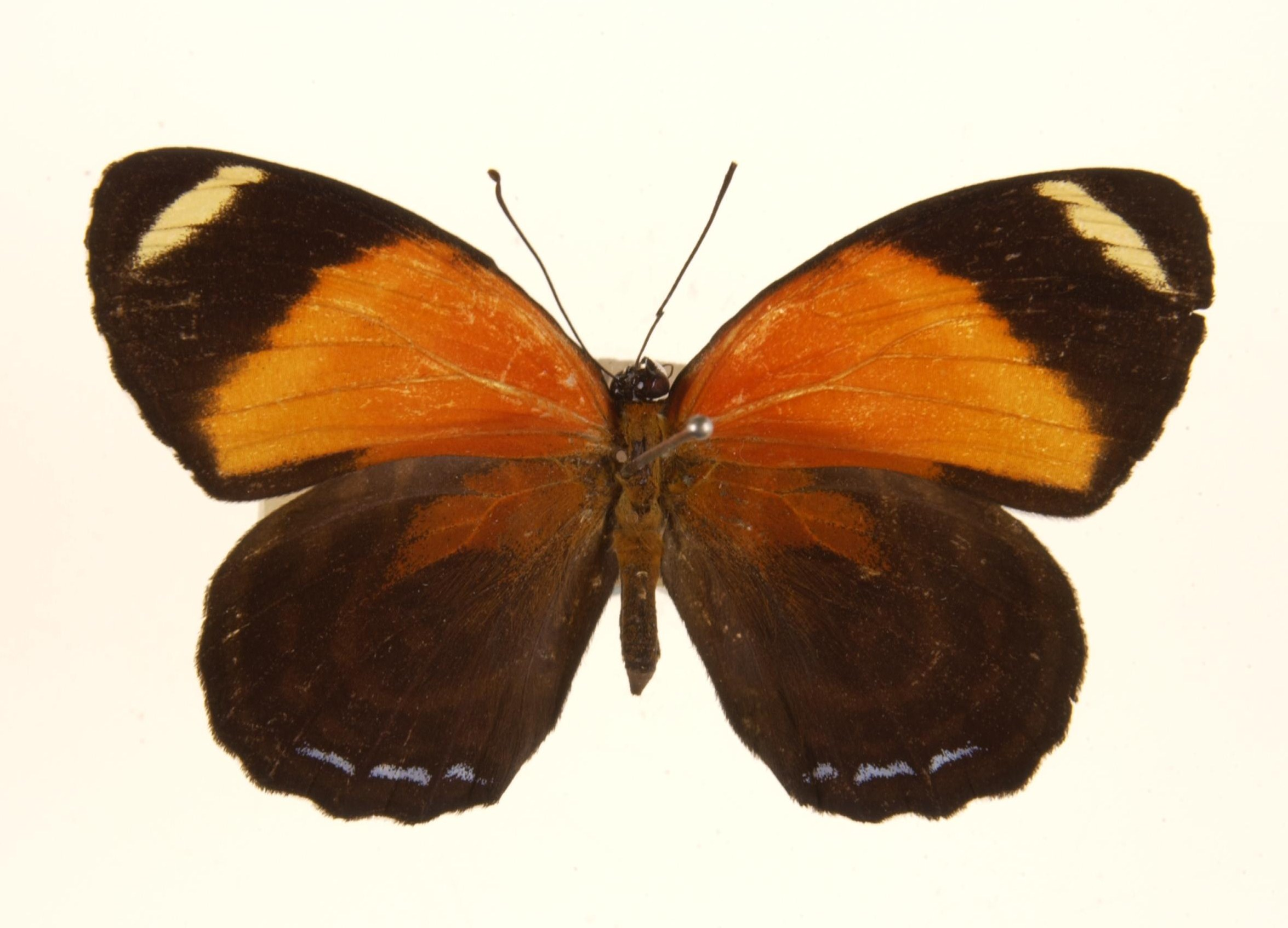
Astarte eighty-eight,
C. astarte, upperside

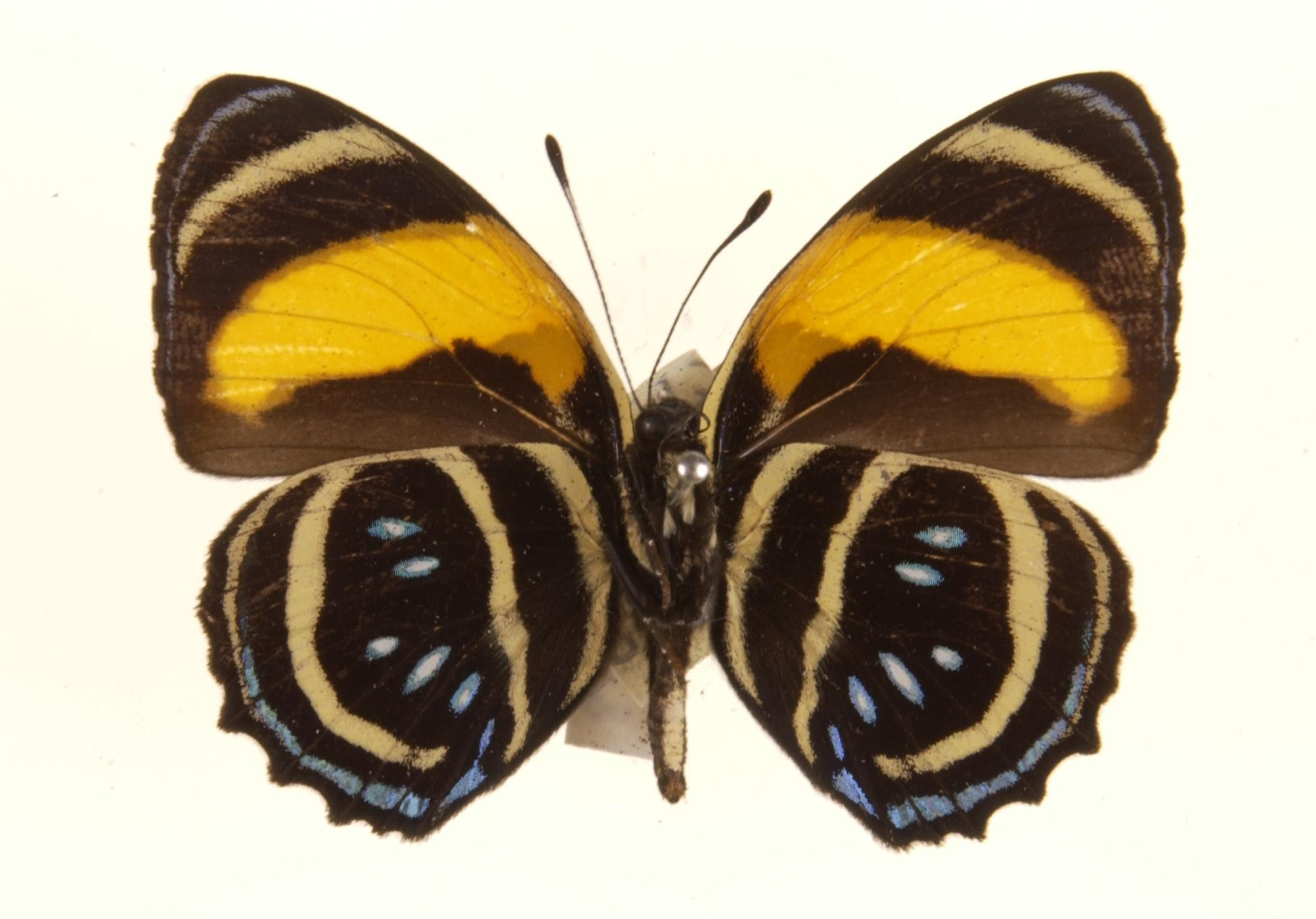
Aegina numberwing,
C. l. salamis, underside

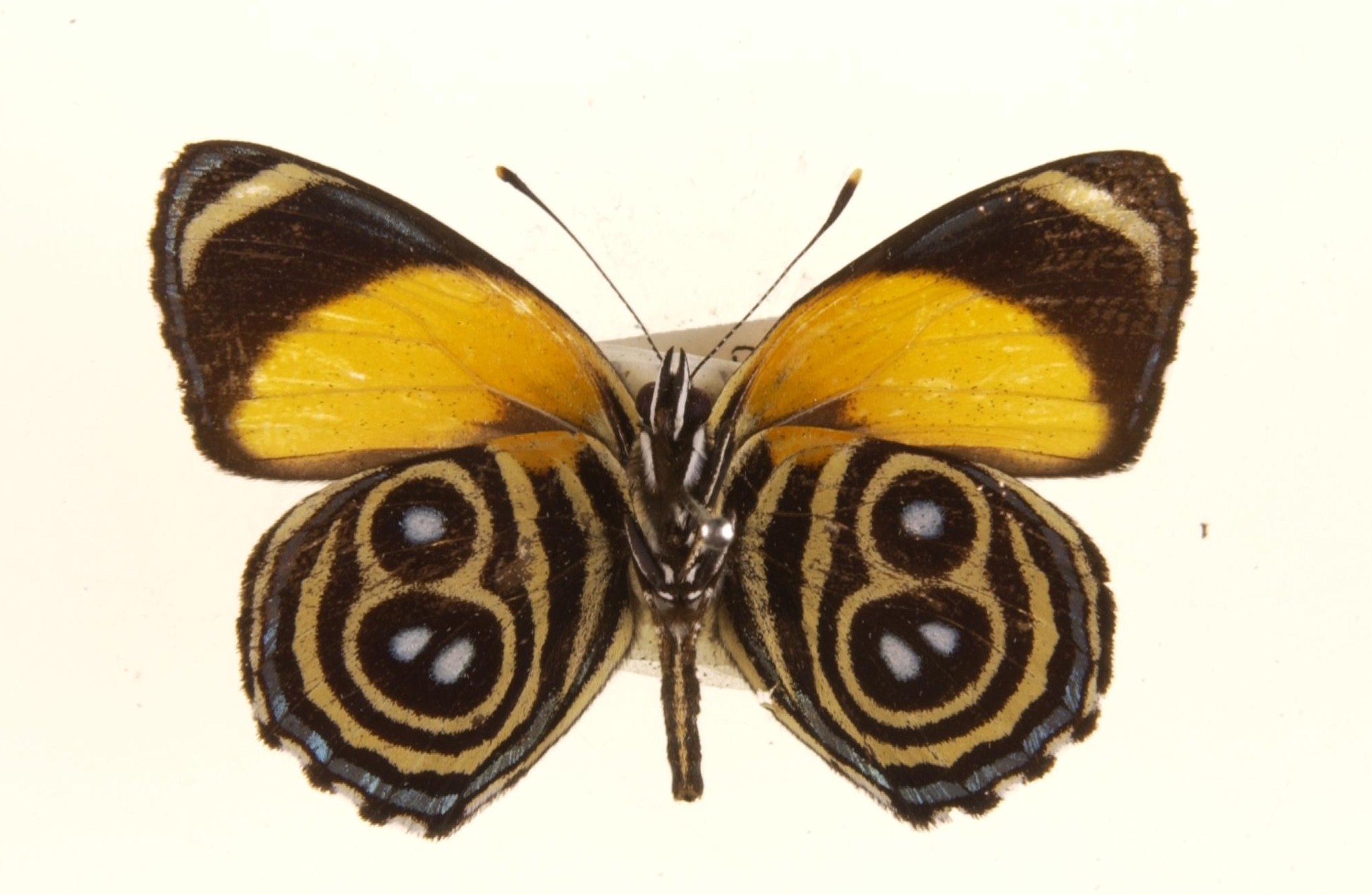
Eunomia eighty-eight,
C. eunomia, underside

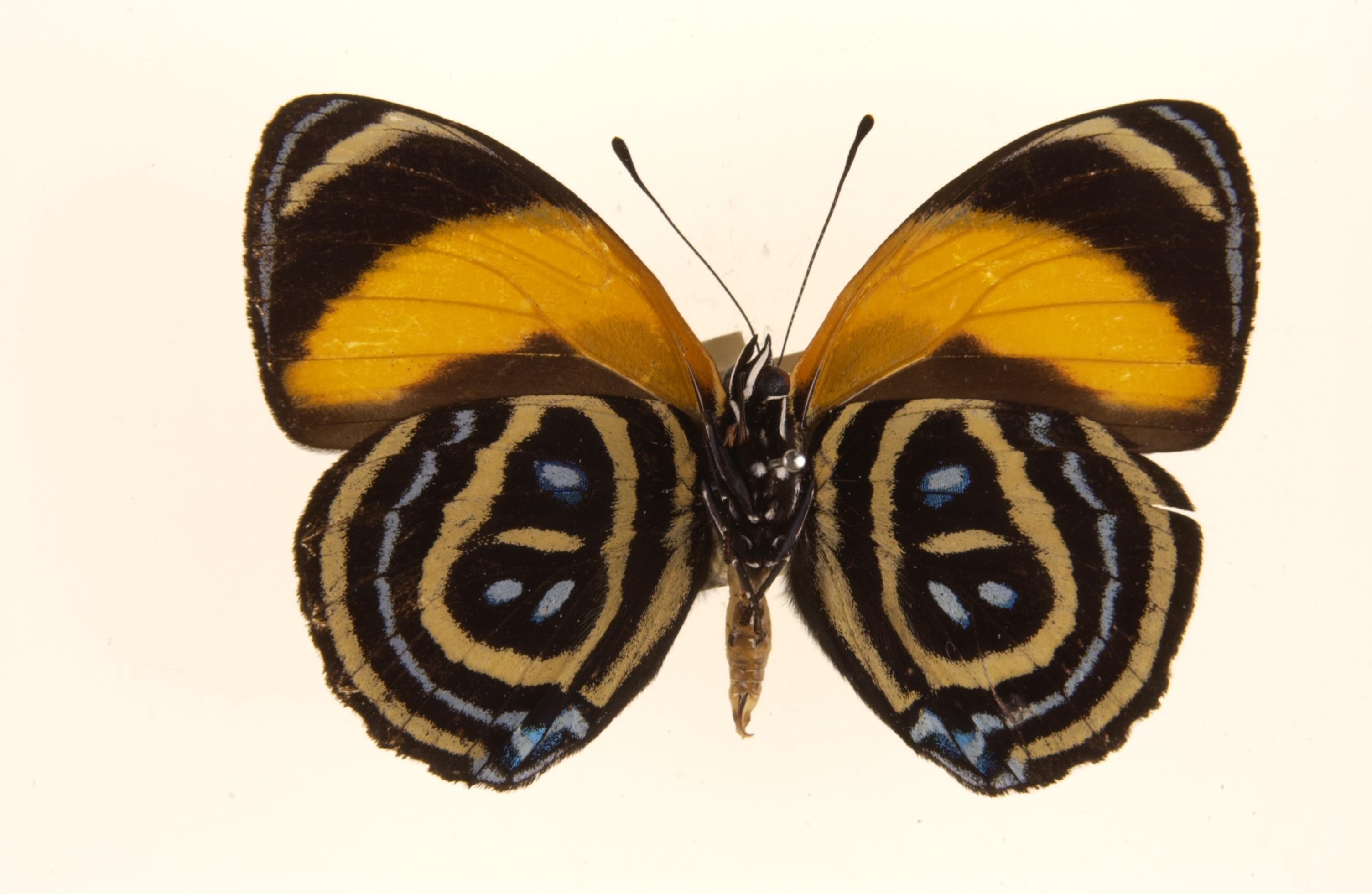
Superb numberwing,
C. e. pastazza, underside

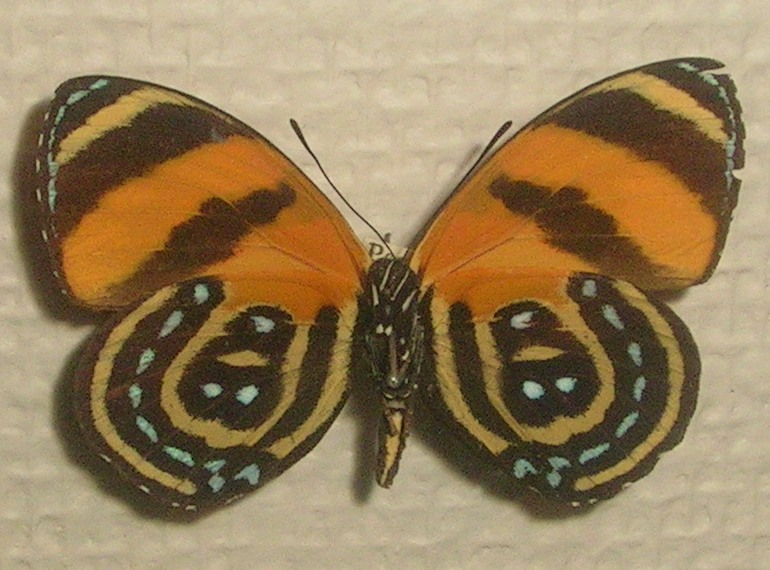
Cynosura eighty-eight,
C. cynosura, underside

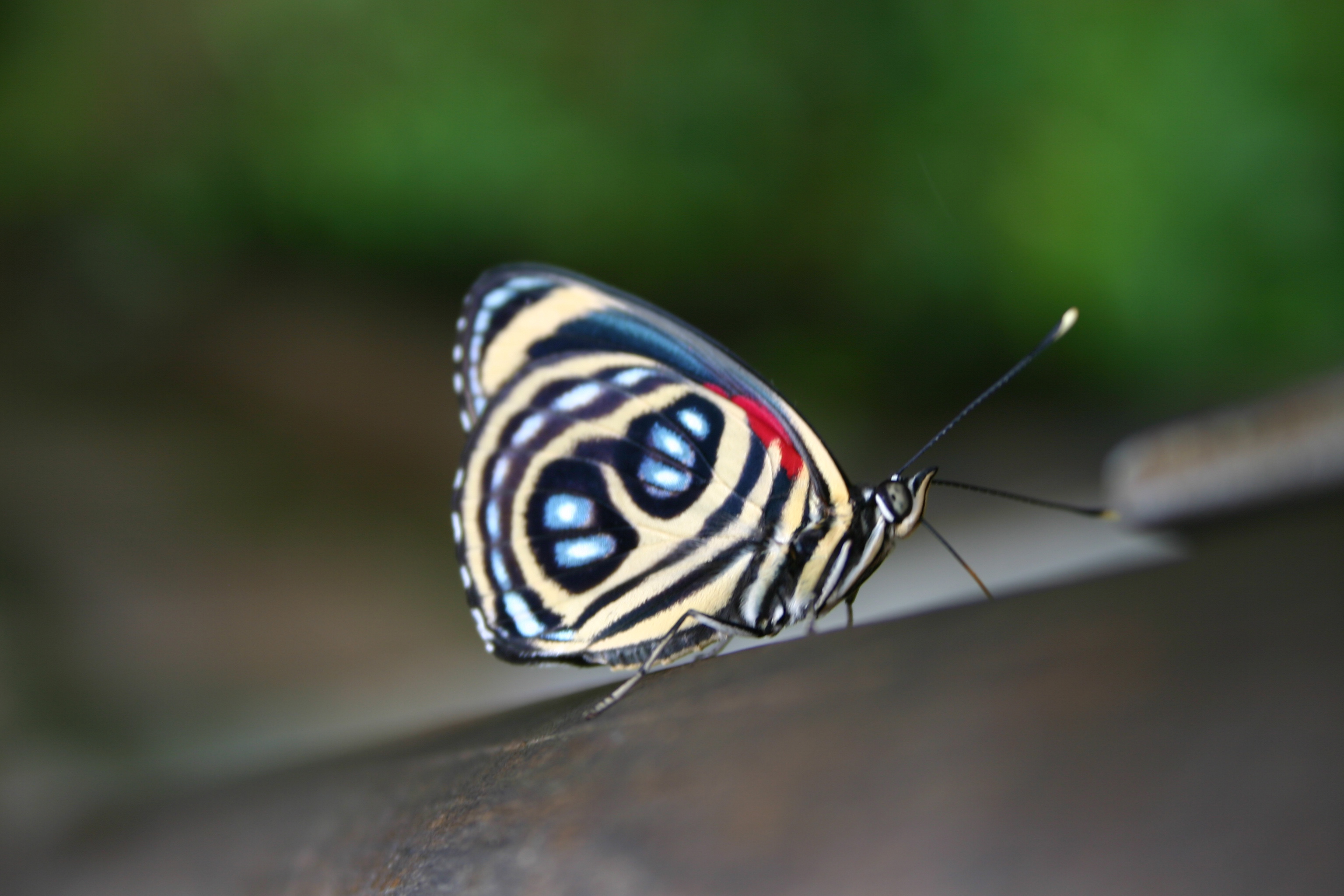
Pygas eighty-eight,
(C. pygas)
Iguazu Falls, Brazil
