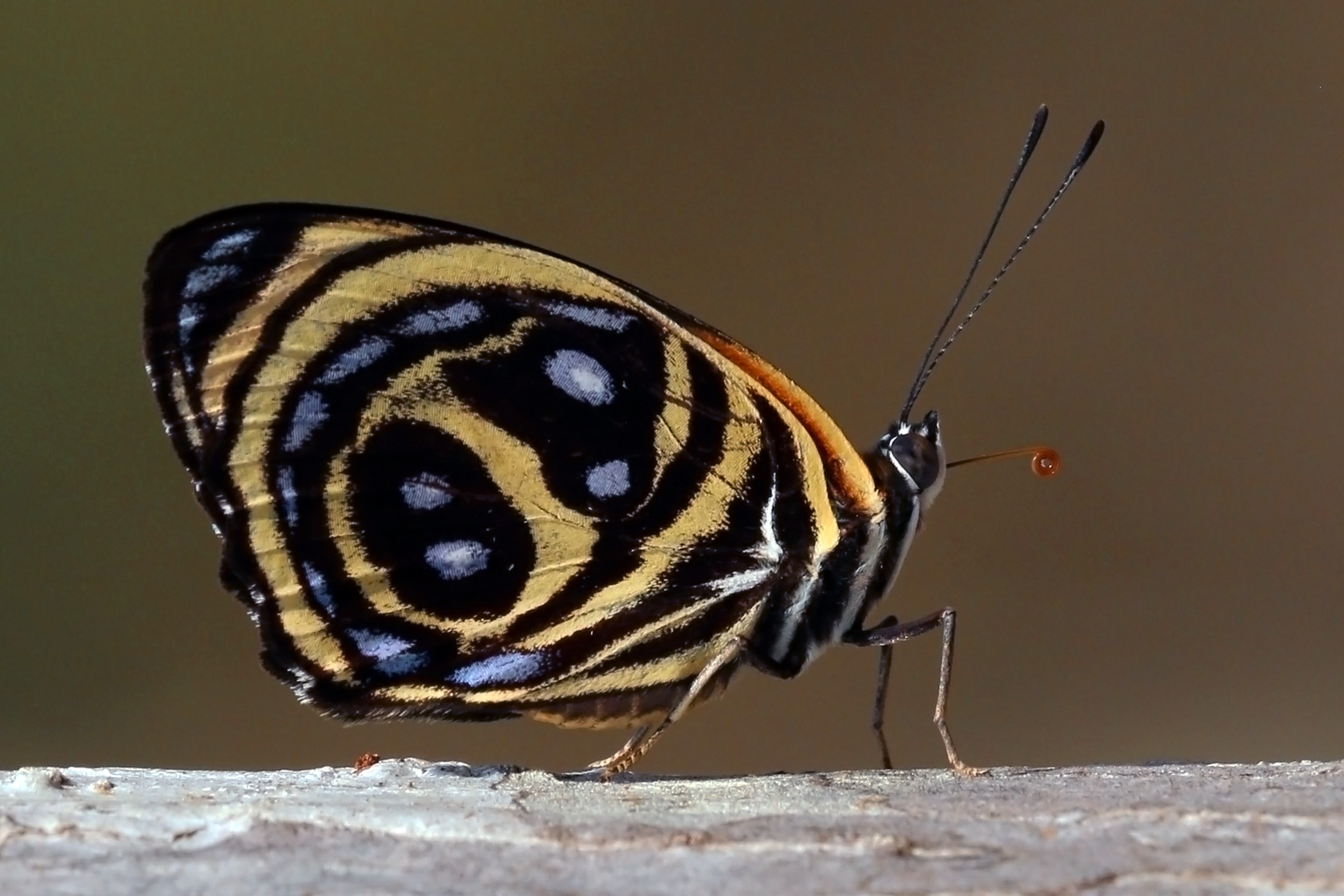

Scientific classification
- Kingdom: Animalia
- Phylum: Arthropoda
- Clade: Pancrustacea
- Class: Insecta
- Order: Lepidoptera
- Family: Nymphalidae
- Genus: Callicore
- Species: C. texa

Binomial name
- Callicore texa (Hewitson, 1855)

Synonyms
- Catagramma texa Hewitson, 1855; Catagramma texa zyxina Fruhstorfer, 1916

= Callicore texa =

Yellow-rimmed eighty-eight

Species of butterfly

Callicore texa, the yellow-rimmed eighty-eight or the texa eighty-eight, is a species of butterfly of the family Nymphalidae. The common name refers to the markings on the underside of the hindwings, which resemble the number "88". The species is found from Mexico south to Colombia.

Callicore texa was described by William Chapman Hewitson in 1855 under the initial name of Catagramma texa.

== Subspecies ==
- C. t. aretas
- C. t. bari
- C. t. boyeri
- C. t. fassli
- C. t. heroica
- C. t. kayei
- C. t. loxicha
- C. t. maimuna
- C. t. maximilla
- C. t. sigillata
- C. t. skinneri
- C. t. strympli
- C. t. tacana
- C. t. texa
- C. t. titania
