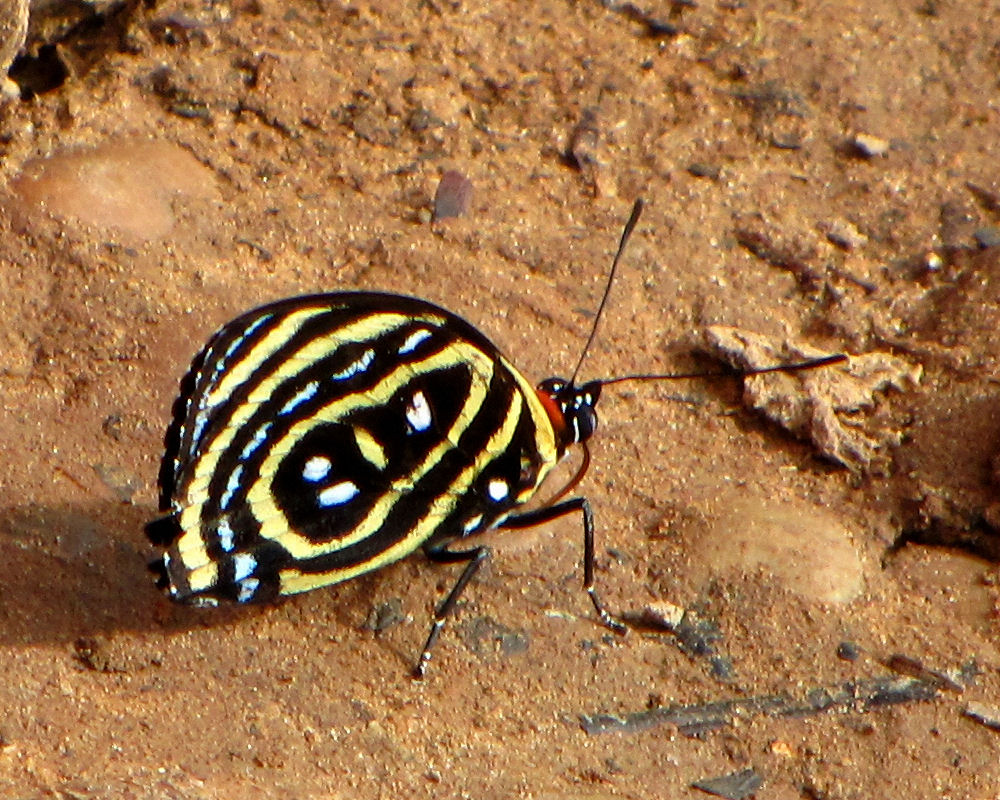
- Tambopata National Reserve, Peru

Scientific classification
- Kingdom: Animalia
- Phylum: Arthropoda
- Clade: Pancrustacea
- Class: Insecta
- Order: Lepidoptera
- Family: Nymphalidae
- Genus: Callicore
- Species: C. excelsior

Binomial name
- Callicore excelsior (Hewitson, [1858])

Synonyms
- Catagramma excelsior Hewitson, [1858]; Catagramma excelsior uaupensis Dillon, 1948; Catagramma oberthüri Skinner, 1916 (preocc. Niepelt, [1914]); Catagramma oberthueri Skinner, 1916; Callicore excelsior coruscans Röber, 1921; Catagramma latimargo Hering, 1932; Catagramma arirambae albifasciata Röber, 1924

= Callicore excelsior =

Species of butterfly

Callicore excelsior, the superb numberwing or excelsior eighty-eight, is a species of butterfly of the family Nymphalidae. It is found in Colombia, Ecuador, Peru, Brazil, and Bolivia.

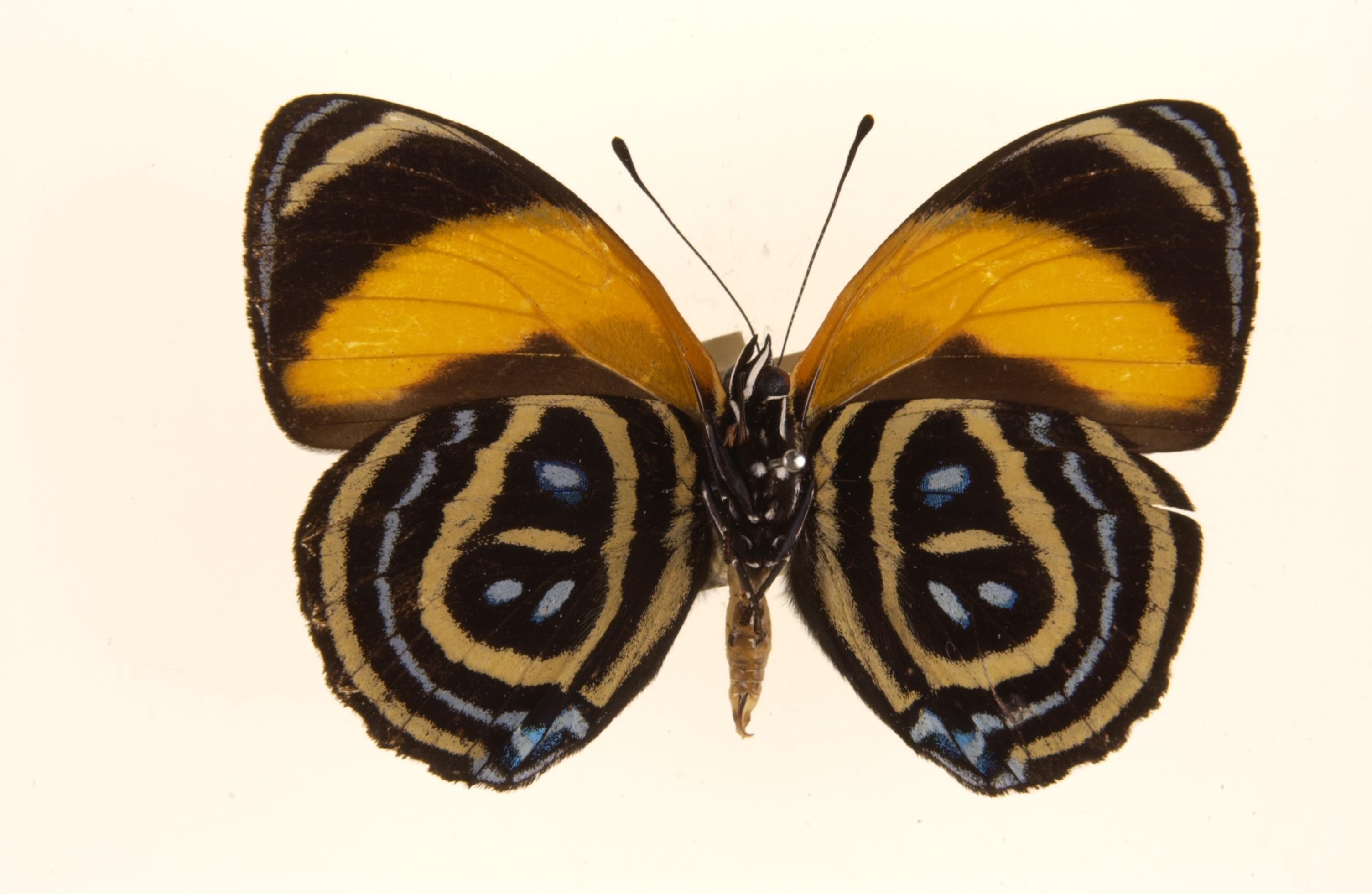
C. e. pastazza, underside

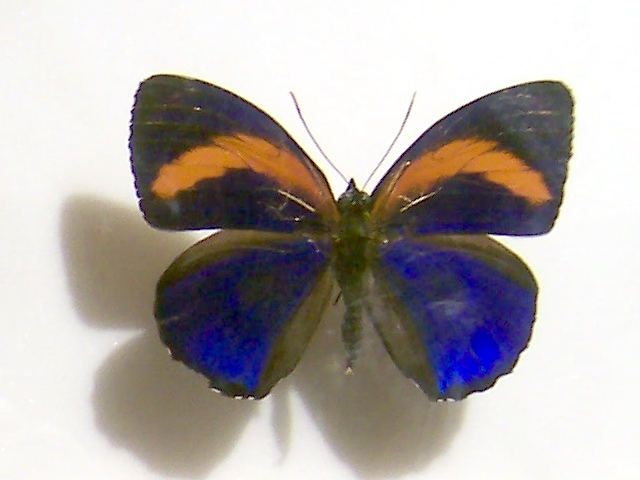
C. e. pastazza, topside

== Subspecies ==
- C. e. excelsior (Brazil (Amazonas))
- C. e. inferior (Butler, 1877) (Ecuador, Peru)
- C. e. excelsissima (Staudinger, [1885]) (Brazil (Amazonas))
- C. e. pastazza (Staudinger, 1886) (Peru)
- C. e. michaeli (Staudinger, 1890) (Brazil (Amazonas, Mato Grosso))
- C. e. splendida (Weymer, 1890) (Peru)
- C. e. arirambae (Ducke, 1913) (Brazil (Pará, Amazonas))
- C. e. elatior (Oberthür, 1916) (Ecuador)
- C. e. ockendeni (Oberthür, 1916) (Peru)
- C. e. micheneri (Dillon, 1948) (Colombia, Ecuador)
- C. e. mauensis (Fassl, 1922) (Brazil (Amazonas))
- C. e. marisolae Neukirchen, 1995 (Brazil (Amazonas))
