= Eunomia insularis =

Scientific classification
- Kingdom: Animalia
- Phylum: Arthropoda
- Clade: Pancrustacea
- Class: Insecta
- Order: Lepidoptera
- Superfamily: Noctuoidea
- Family: Erebidae
- Subfamily: Arctiinae
- Genus: Eunomia
- Species: E. insularis

Binomial name
- Eunomia insularis Grote, 1866

Synonyms
- Glaucopis elegantula Herrich-Schäffer, 1866; Eunomia elegantula

Species of moth

Eunomia insularis is a moth in the subfamily Arctiinae first described by Augustus Radcliffe Grote in 1866. It is found in Cuba.
