= Eunomia rubripunctata =

Scientific classification
- Kingdom: Animalia
- Phylum: Arthropoda
- Clade: Pancrustacea
- Class: Insecta
- Order: Lepidoptera
- Superfamily: Noctuoidea
- Family: Erebidae
- Subfamily: Arctiinae
- Genus: Eunomia
- Species: E. rubripunctata

Binomial name
- Eunomia rubripunctata (Butler, 1876)

Synonyms
- Marissa rubripunctata Butler, 1876

Species of moth

Eunomia rubripunctata is a moth of the subfamily Arctiinae. It was described by Arthur Gardiner Butler in 1876. It is found on Jamaica and Puerto Rico.
