= Eunomia caymanensis =

Scientific classification
- Kingdom: Animalia
- Phylum: Arthropoda
- Clade: Pancrustacea
- Class: Insecta
- Order: Lepidoptera
- Superfamily: Noctuoidea
- Family: Erebidae
- Subfamily: Arctiinae
- Genus: Eunomia
- Species: E. caymanensis

Binomial name
- Eunomia caymanensis Hampson, 1911

Species of moth

Eunomia caymanensis is a moth of the subfamily Arctiinae. It was described by George Hampson in 1911. It is found on the Cayman Islands and Cuba.
