= Eunomia nitidula =

Scientific classification
- Kingdom: Animalia
- Phylum: Arthropoda
- Clade: Pancrustacea
- Class: Insecta
- Order: Lepidoptera
- Superfamily: Noctuoidea
- Family: Erebidae
- Subfamily: Arctiinae
- Genus: Eunomia
- Species: E. nitidula

Binomial name
- Eunomia nitidula (Herrich-Schäffer, 1866)

Synonyms
- Glaucopis nitidula Herrich-Schäffer, 1866

Species of moth

Eunomia nitidula is a moth in the subfamily Arctiinae first described by Gottlieb August Wilhelm Herrich-Schäffer in 1866. It is found on Cuba.
