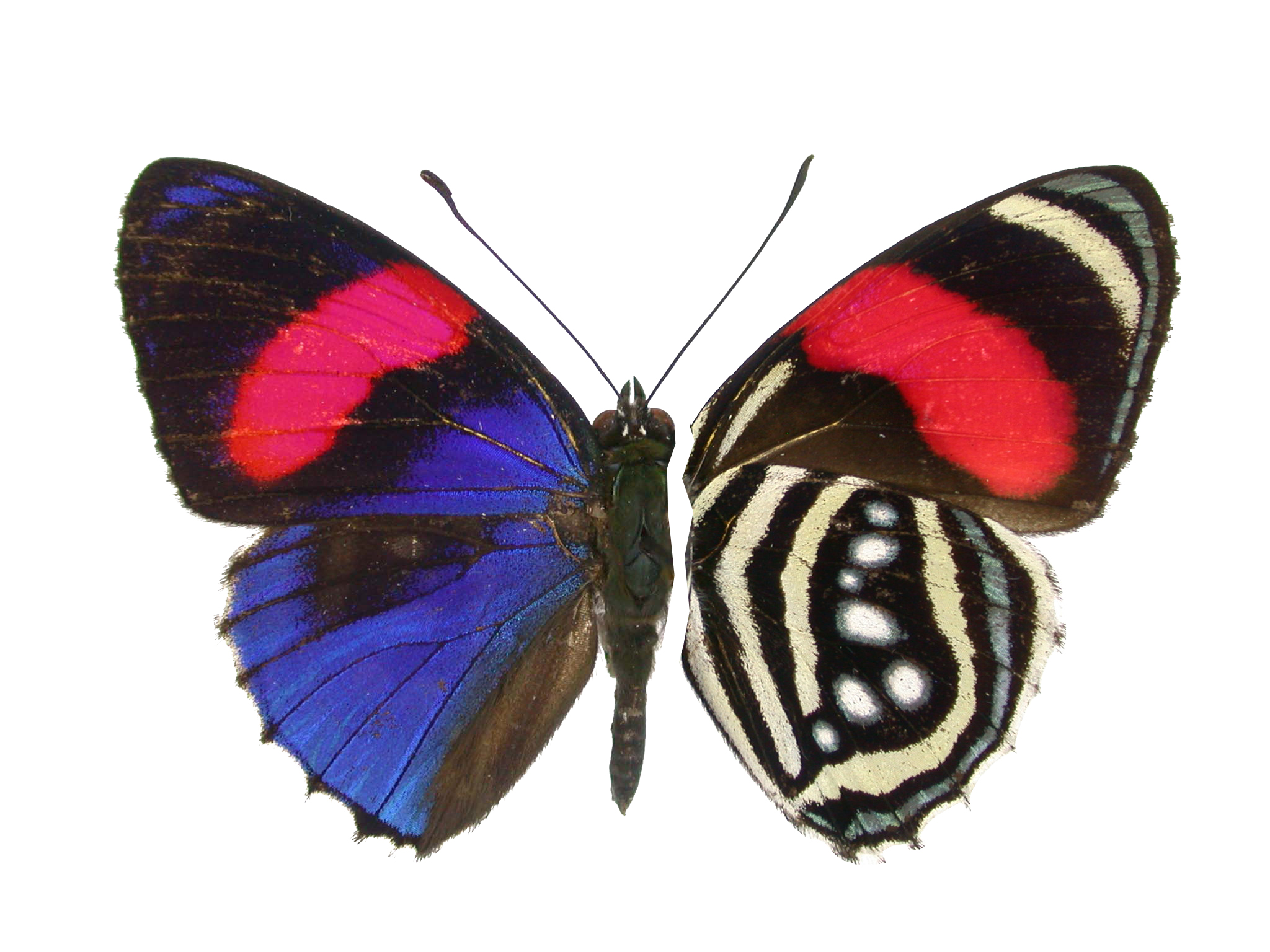

Scientific classification
- Kingdom: Animalia
- Phylum: Arthropoda
- Clade: Pancrustacea
- Class: Insecta
- Order: Lepidoptera
- Family: Nymphalidae
- Genus: Callicore
- Species: C. hesperis

Binomial name
- Callicore hesperis (Guérin-Méneville, [1844])

Synonyms
- Catagramma hesperis Guérin-Méneville, [1844]; Catagramma parima Hewitson, 1852; Catagramma mellyi Guenée, 1872

= Callicore hesperis =

Hesperis eighty-eight

Species of butterfly

Callicore hesperis, the hesperis eighty-eight or hesperis numberwing, is a species of butterfly of the family Nymphalidae. It is found in Colombia, Brazil, Ecuador, Peru, and Bolivia.

The wingspan is about 45 mm.
