= Eunomia (moth) =

Scientific classification
- Kingdom: Animalia
- Phylum: Arthropoda
- Clade: Pancrustacea
- Class: Insecta
- Order: Lepidoptera
- Superfamily: Noctuoidea
- Family: Erebidae
- Subfamily: Arctiinae
- Genus: Eunomia; Hübner, 1818

Synonyms
- Glaucopis Hübner, 1808; Marissa Walker, 1854

Genus of moths

Eunomia is a genus of moths in the subfamily Arctiinae erected by Jacob Hübner in 1818.

== Species ==
- Eunomia caymanensis Hampson, 1911
- Eunomia colombina (Fabricius, 1793)
- Eunomia insularis Grote, 1866
- Eunomia latenigra (Butler, 1876)
- Eunomia nitidula (Herrich-Schäffer, 1866)
- Eunomia rubripunctata (Butler, 1876)
