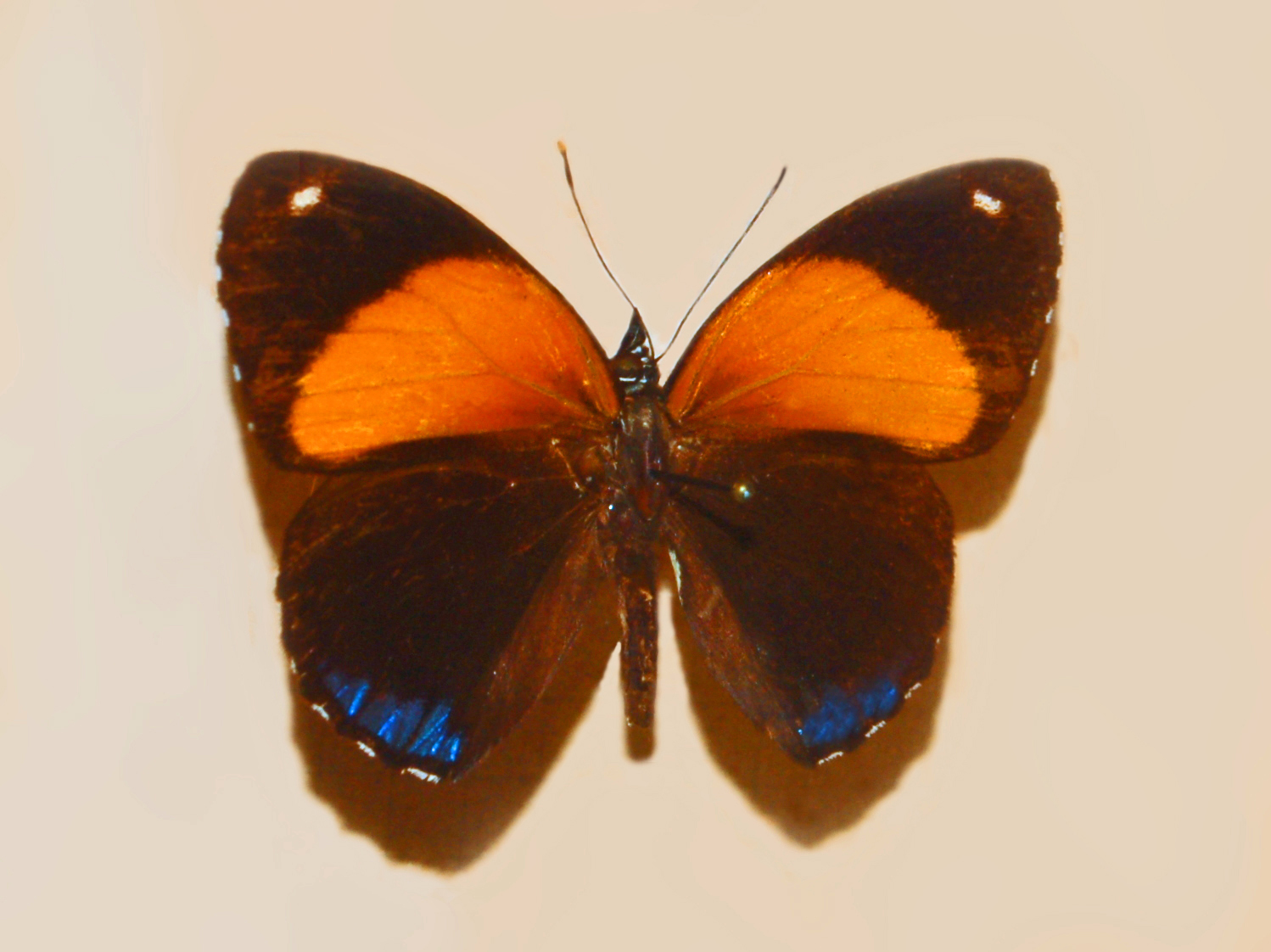
- From Peru
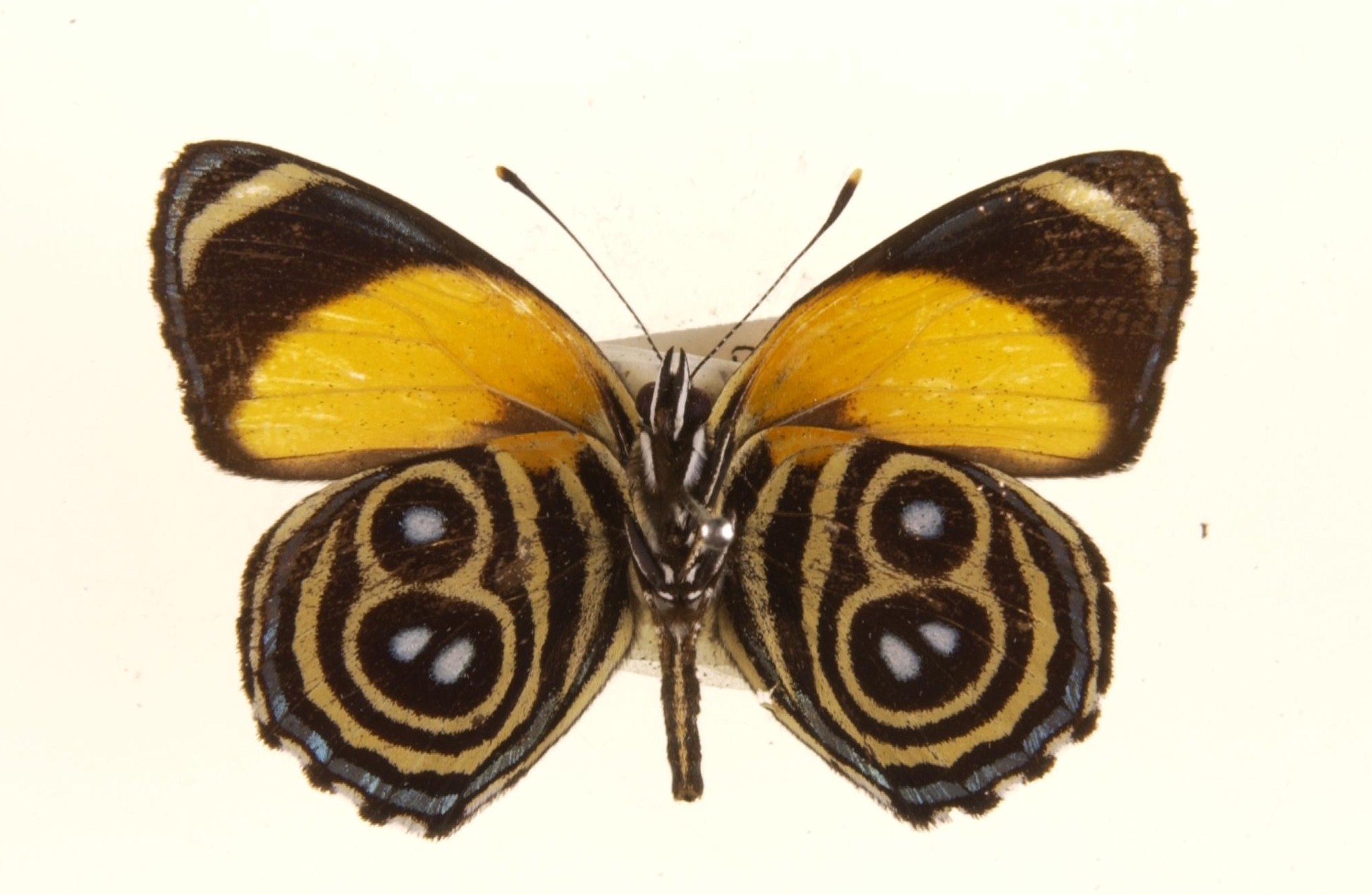
- Ventral view

Scientific classification
- Kingdom: Animalia
- Phylum: Arthropoda
- Clade: Pancrustacea
- Class: Insecta
- Order: Lepidoptera
- Family: Nymphalidae
- Genus: Callicore
- Species: C. eunomia

Binomial name
- Callicore eunomia (Hewitson, 1853)

Synonyms
- Catagramma eunomia Hewitson, 1853; Catagramma eunomia carmen Oberthür, 1916

= Callicore eunomia =

Eunomia eighty-eight

Species of butterfly

Callicore eunomia, the Eunomia eighty-eight or Eunomia numberwing, is a species of butterfly of the family Nymphalidae. It is found in the upper Amazonian region, from Colombia and Guyana to Brazil, Peru, and Bolivia.

The wingspan is 30–40 mm. Renowned lepidopterist William Chapman Hewitson provided the first description of the "eighty-eight" in 1853. As of 2023, it has been returned to placement in Catagramma.

== Subspecies ==
- Callicore eunomia eunomia (Ecuador, Peru)
- Callicore eunomia incarnata (Röber, 1915) (Bolivia, Peru)
- Callicore eunomia valeriae Neild, 1996 (Venezuela)
- Callicore eunomia ferrerorum Attal, 2000 (Venezuela)
- Callicore eunomia alani Attal & Crosson du Cormier, 2003
