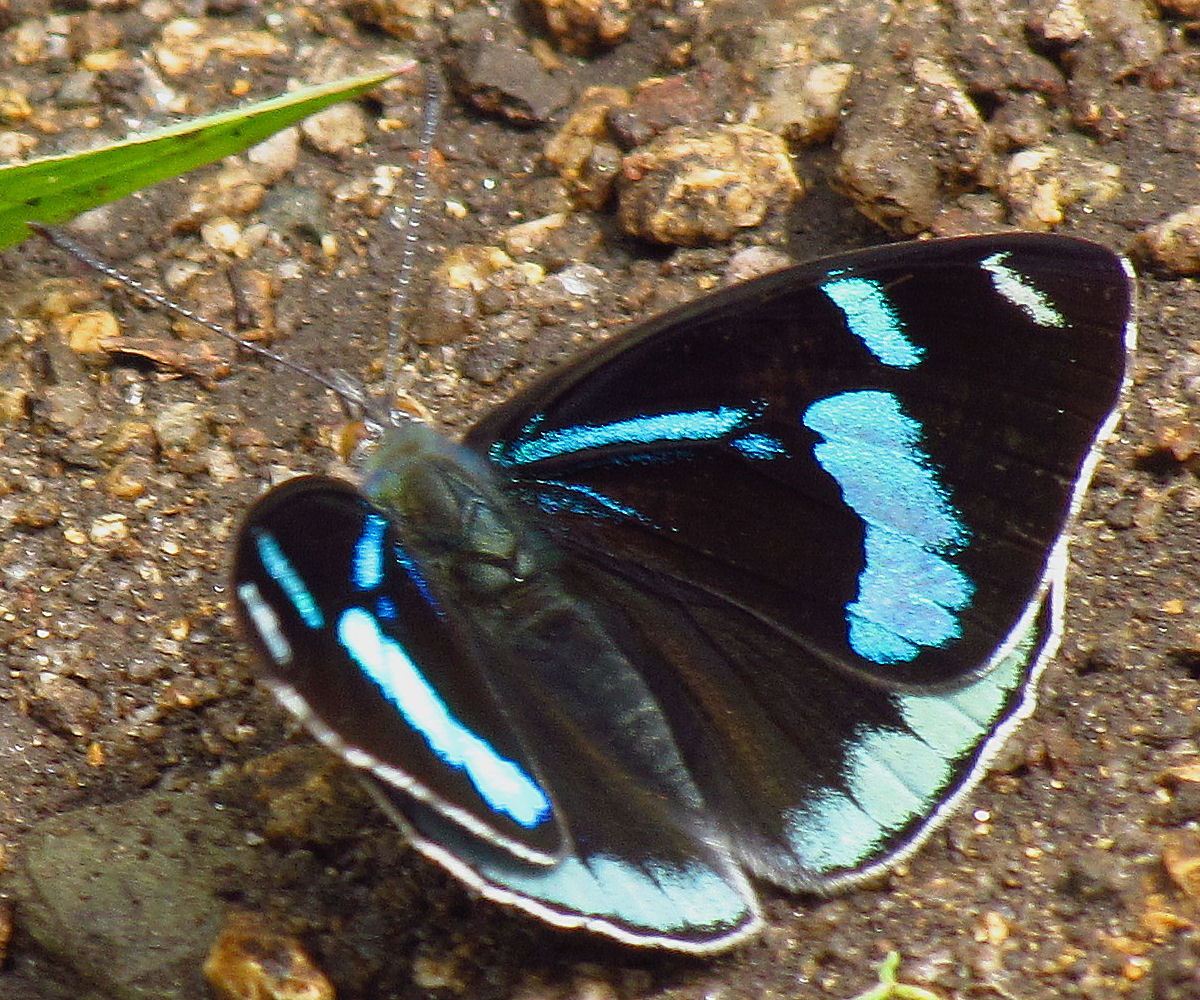
- Cyan-banded Pericloud (P. jurinei), Aguas Calientes, Peru
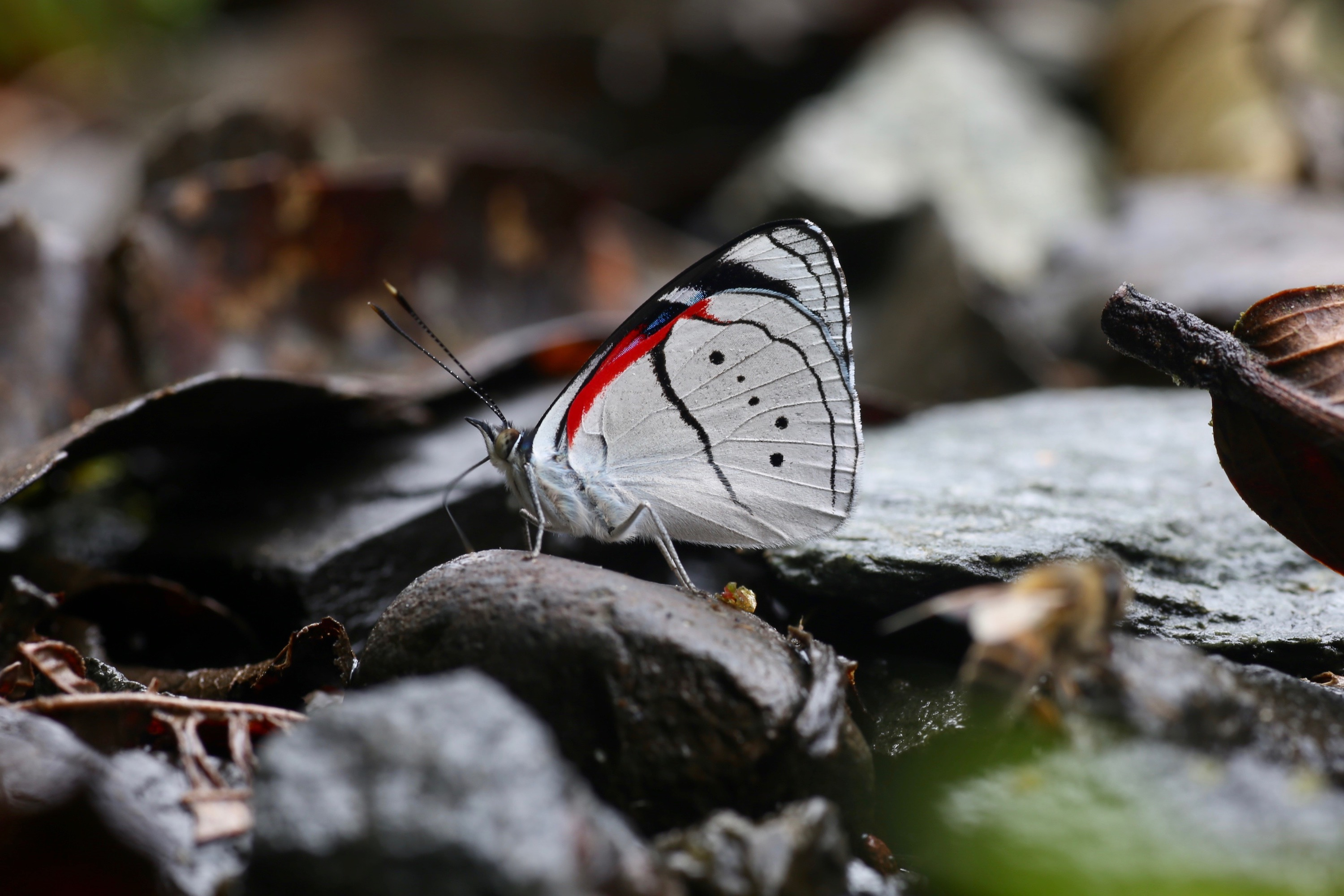
- Alice's Pericloud (Perisama alicia alicia), El Topo, Ecuador

Scientific classification
- Domain: Eukaryota
- Kingdom: Animalia
- Phylum: Arthropoda
- Class: Insecta
- Order: Lepidoptera
- Family: Nymphalidae
- Tribe: Callicorini
- Genus: Perisama; Doubleday, [1849]

Species
- Numerous, see text

= Perisama =

Genus of brush-footed butterflies

Perisama is a brush-footed butterfly genus found in the Neotropical realm, ranging from Colombia and Venezuela to Argentina.

== Species ==
Listed alphabetically by group and within groups:

The alicia species group:

- Perisama alicia (Hewitson, 1868) — Alice's Pericloud
- Perisama cabirnia (Hewitson, 1874)
- Perisama comnena (Hewitson, 1868)
- Perisama emma Oberthür, 1916
- Perisama gisco Godman & Salvin, 1880
- Perisama guerini C. & R. Felder, [1867]
- Perisama humboldtii (Guérin-Méneville, [1844])
- Perisama ilia Röber, 1915
- Perisama nevada Attal & Crosson du Cormier, 1996
- Perisama tringa (Guenée, 1872)
- Perisama vitringa (Hewitson, 1858)
- Perisama yeba (Hewitson, 1857)

The bomplandii species group:

- Perisama bomplandii (Guérin-Méneville, [1844])
- Perisama morona (Hewitson, 1868)
- Perisama moronina Röber, 1915

The canoma species group:

- Perisama canoma Druce, 1874 – Manu Pericloud
- Perisama satanas Attal & Crosson du Cormier, 1996

The dorbignyi species group:

- Perisama aldasi Attal & Crosson du Cormier, 1996
- Perisama dorbignyi (Guérin-Méneville, [1844])
- Perisama jurinei (Guenée, 1872) – Cyan-banded Pericloud
- Perisama patara (Hewitson, 1855

The lebasii species group:

- Perisama ambatensis Oberthür, 1916
- Perisama calamis (Hewitson, 1869)
- Perisama hilara Salvin, 1869
- Perisama koenigi Descimon & Mast de Maeght, 1995
- Perisama lanice (Hewitson, 1868)
- Perisama lebasii (Guérin-Méneville, [1844])

The oppelii species group:

- Perisama oppelii (Latreille, [1809])
- Perisama xanthica (Hewitson, 1868)

The paralicia species group:

- Perisama paralicia Fruhstorfer, 1916

The philinus species group:

- Perisama philinus Doubleday, [1849]
- Perisama tristrigosa Butler, 1873 – Butler's Pericloud

The tryphena species group:

- Perisama affinis Attal & Crosson du Cormier, 1996
- Perisama antioquia Attal & Crosson du Cormier, 1996
- Perisama cloelia (Hewitson, 1868)
- Perisama goeringi Druce, 1875
- Perisama hazarma (Hewitson, 1877)
- Perisama ouma Dognin, 1891
- Perisama tryphena (Hewitson, 1857) — Straw-vented Pericloud
- Perisama typhania Oberthür, 1916

Unknown taxa:

- Perisama amyntichus Doubleday, 1849
