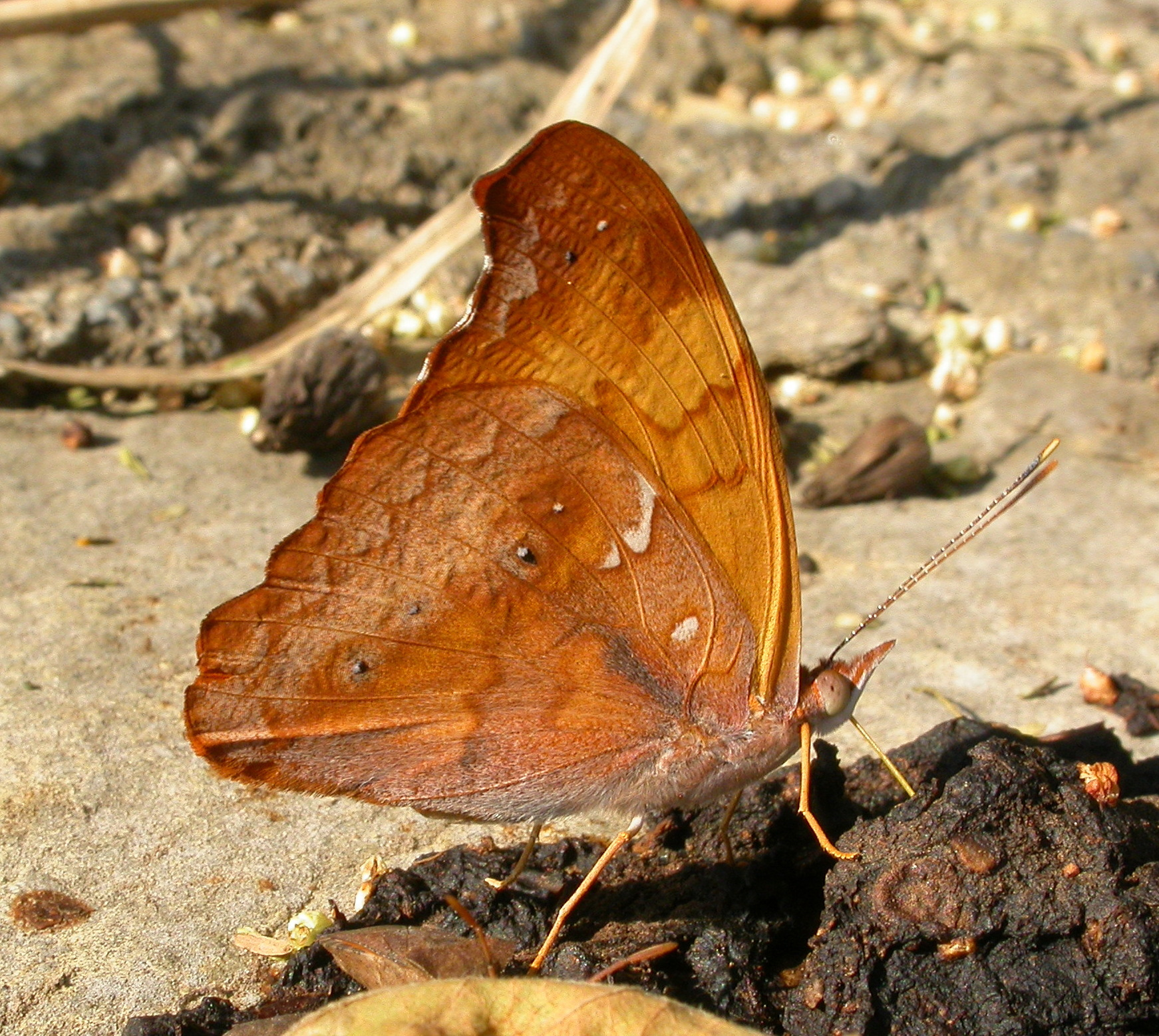
- Temenis laothoe

Scientific classification
- Kingdom: Animalia
- Phylum: Arthropoda
- Class: Insecta
- Order: Lepidoptera
- Family: Nymphalidae
- Subfamily: Biblidinae
- Genus: Temenis; Hübner, 1819

Type species
- Papilio merione Fabricius 1781

Species
- See text

Synonyms
- Paromia Hewitson, 1861; Zemenis Hewitson, 1861; Tamenes Hayward, 1950; Callicorina Smart, 1976; Themenis Teston & Corseuil, 2008

= Temenis =

Genus of butterflies

Temenis is a genus of butterflies in the family Nymphalidae, it consists of three species. It was first described by Jacob Hübner in 1819. Members of the genus Temenis are found throughout Central and South America.

== Description ==
The genus Temenis is a member of the tribe Epiphilini, of the subgenus Biblidinae. The type species is Papilio merione, a former synonym of Temenis laothoe. It is closely related to butterflies in the genera Epiphile and Nica, only distinguished from one another due to morphological differences in the larval stage. Previously, the genus was considered close to the genera Epiphile, as well as Catonephele, Cybdelis, Myscelia, Pseudonica, and Pyrrhogyra in a group dubbed the "Catonephelinae" by Ebert.

There are three members that consist of the genus, the members of which can be differentiated through differences in wing patterning and structure. Temenis laothoe is the most recognizable member of the genus, and has a range that stretches from Mexico to Bolivia, making contrasting with it more straightforward. T. pulchra, compared with T. laothoe, has much more rounded wings along with two pinkish red diagonal bands running from the leading edge of the wing all the way to the posterior corner of the wing. T. huebneri has a similar wing shape to T. laothoe but is dark brown in color and has a broad orange band across the forewings as well as orange colored hindwings.

A 2014 proposal by Lucy Mila Garcia Salik proposes splitting the genus further, based on morphological differences, with the new genera Temenis hondurensis, Temenis pallidior, and Temenis violetta. Salik proposes the following phylogenetic tree with regards to the placement of Temenis in the Epiphilini, using implicit weighing analysis:

Newick format: "(Eunica (Callicore (Haematera + Lucinia) (Callicorina + Asterope) (Pyrrhogyra (Nica + Peria) (Bolboneura (Temenis + Epiphile))))))))))"

- - - - Eunica
      - - Callicore
        - - Haematera
          - Lucinia
        - - Callicorina
          - Asterope
        - - Pyrrhogyra
          - - Nica
            - Peria
          - - Bolboneura
            - - Temenis
              - Epiphile

== Life history ==
The larvae are associated with and feed on plants in the family Sapindaceae, like other members of the Biblidinae, such as members of the genera Cardiospermum, Paullinia, Serjania, and Urvillea. Members of the genus are poisonous as a result of the sequestration of toxic compounds consumed during the larval stage by plants in the Sapindaceae family. The eggs of members of the genus Temenis tend to be more flattened compared to their relatives. Larvae tend to mimic bird droppings or camouflage in with their surroundings, with the pupae blending with the surrounding leaves.

Unlike the "flash and hide effect" that some related butterflies employ, members of the genus Temenis are rather conspicuous compared to the background vegetation. The butterflies do tend to fly faster than other butterflies that are considered distasteful, but also lack the dimorphism and mimicry complexes that other related butterflies engage in. The adult butterflies frequent gaps in the forest to visit Sapindaceae vines, despite being found in the canopy. They also frequently visit the ground level to feed on rotting fruits. Temenis laothoe was identified one of the most abundant butterflies in the Yasuni National Park of Ecuadorian Amazonia.

== Distribution ==
Members of the genus Temenis are found throughout Central and South America. Temenis laothoe has a range that stretches from Mexico to Northern Argentina. Temenis pulchra has a range between Central America and the Andes. Temenis huebneri has a range that is confined to the northern and southeastern portions of Brazil's Atlantic Forest. T. laothoe is rarely found in the United States, in the state of Texas, as a stray.

== Taxonomy ==
Temenis contains the following species:

Photograph	Scientific name	Common name	Distribution
	Temenis huebneri Fruhstorfer, 1912		Brazil
	Temenis pulchra (Hewitson, 1861)	Red Banner, Pulchra Banner	Costa Rica to Brazil
	Temenis laothoe (Cramer, 1777)	Orange Banner, Tomato	United States (Texas) to Argentina
