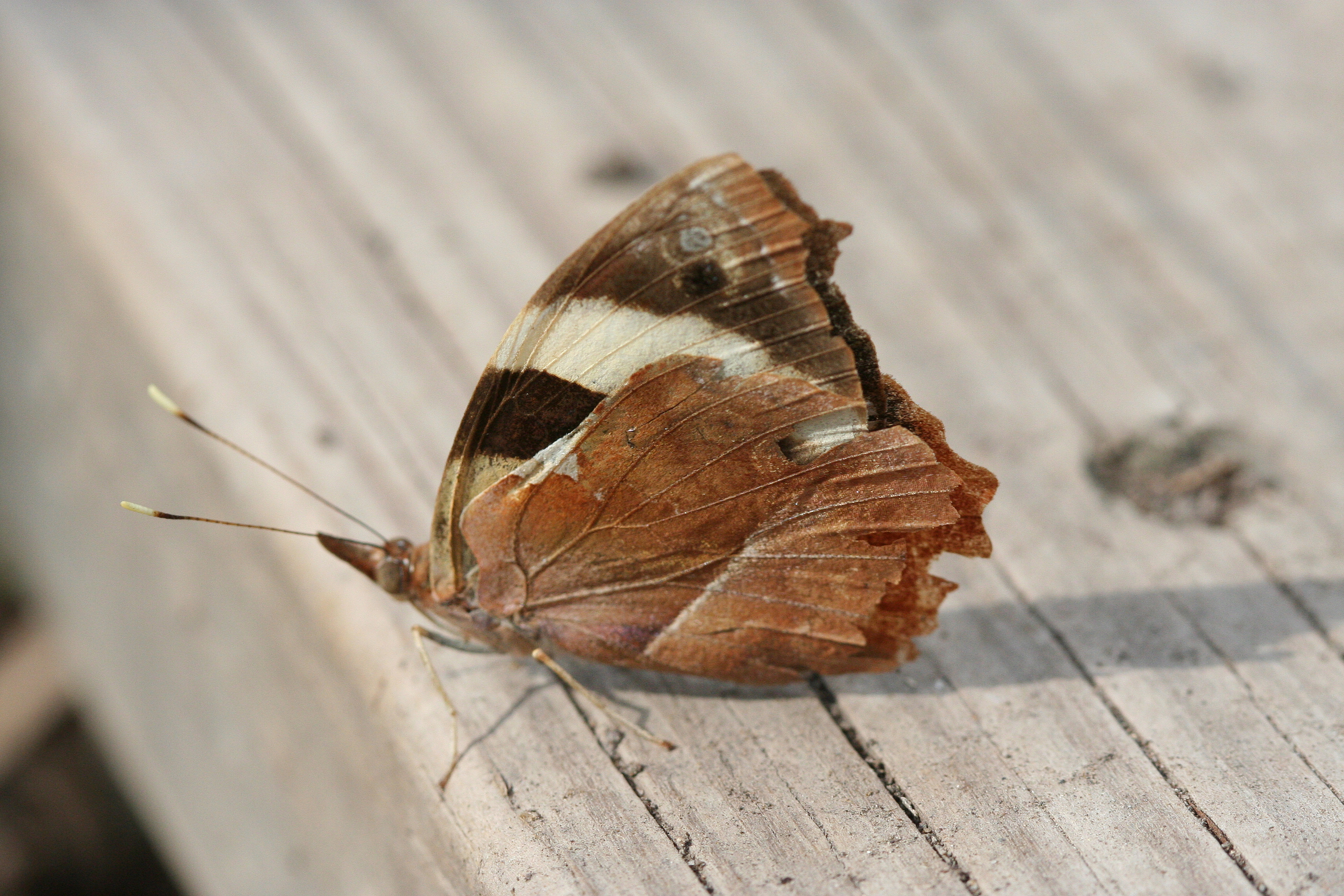

Scientific classification
- Kingdom: Animalia
- Phylum: Arthropoda
- Clade: Pancrustacea
- Class: Insecta
- Order: Lepidoptera
- Family: Nymphalidae
- Tribe: Callicorini
- Genus: Epiphile
- Species: E. adrasta

Binomial name
- Epiphile adrasta Hewitson, 1861

= Epiphile adrasta =

Species of butterfly

Epiphile adrasta, the common banner, is a species of tropical brushfoot in the butterfly family Nymphalidae. It is found in North America.

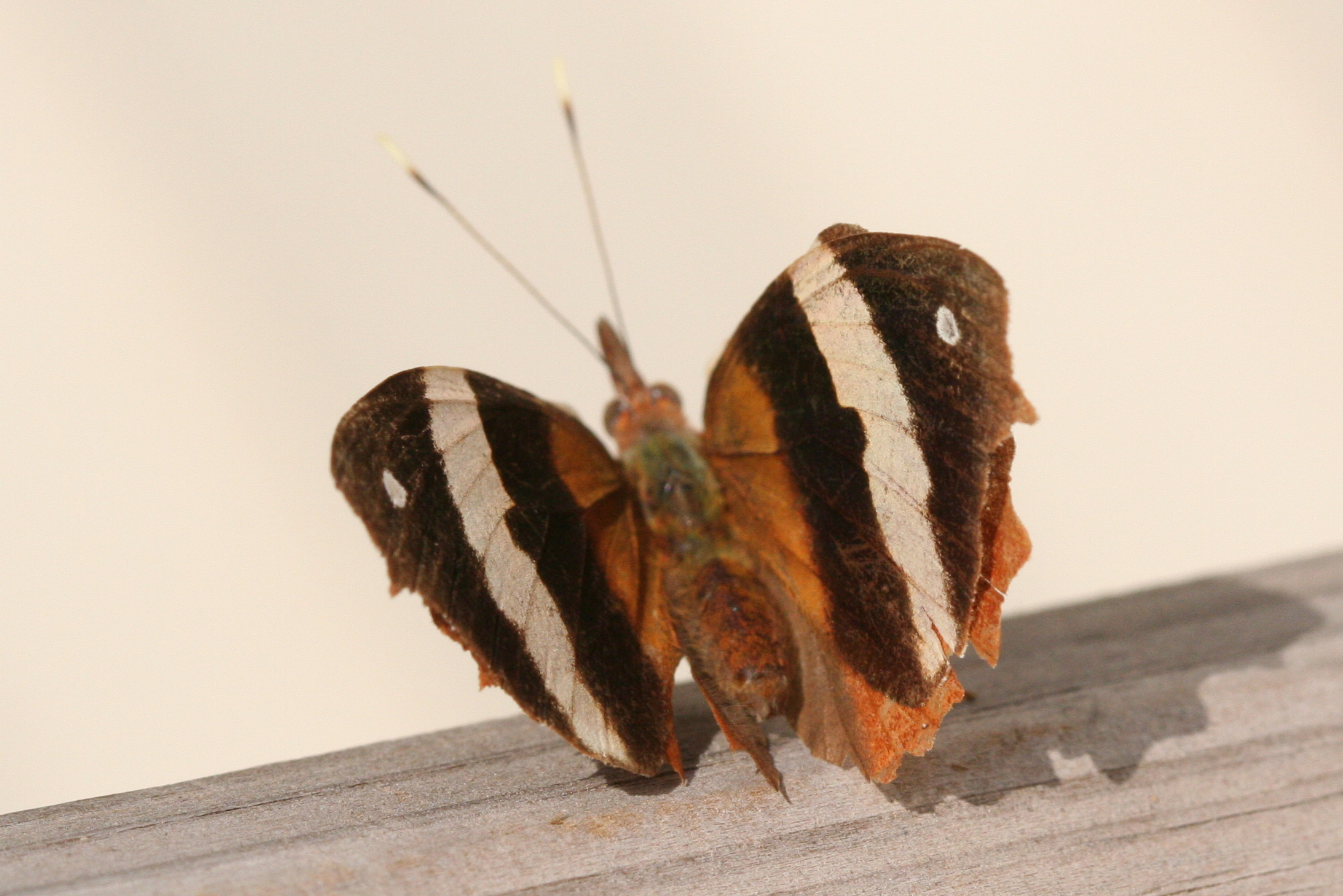
Common banner, Epiphile adrasta

== Subspecies ==
These three subspecies belong to the species Epiphile adrasta:

- Epiphile adrasta adrasta Hewitson, 1861
- Epiphile adrasta bandusia Fruhstorfer, 1912
- Epiphile adrasta escalantei Descimon & De Maeght, 1979
