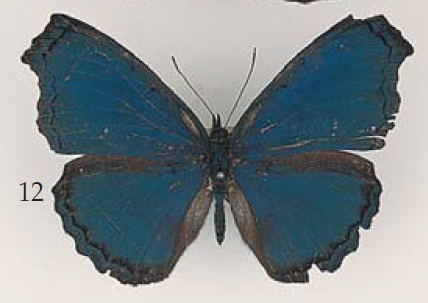

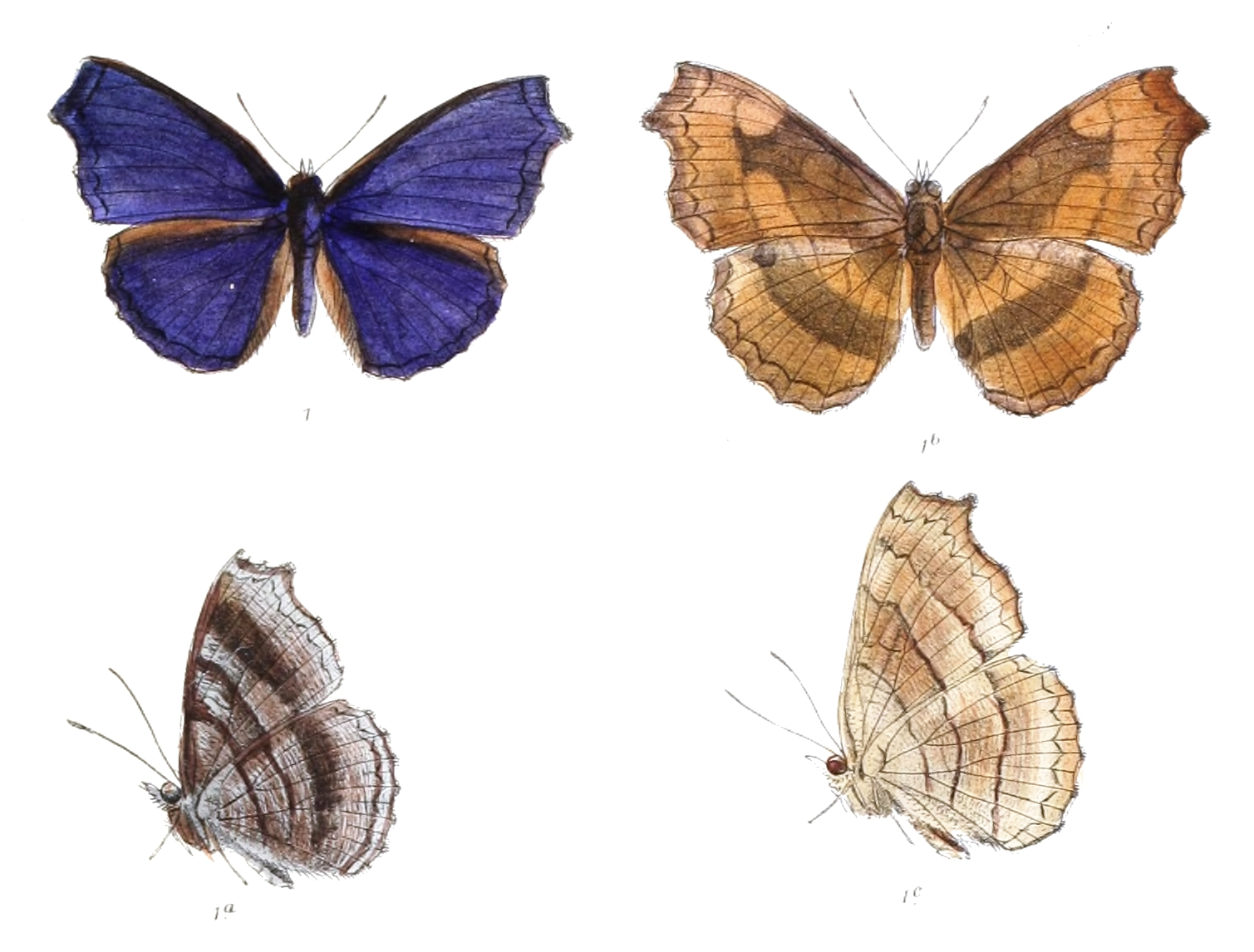

Scientific classification
- Kingdom: Animalia
- Phylum: Arthropoda
- Clade: Pancrustacea
- Class: Insecta
- Order: Lepidoptera
- Family: Nymphalidae
- Genus: Laringa
- Species: L. castelnaui

Binomial name
- Laringa castelnaui (Felder & Felder,1860)

Synonyms
- Eurytela castelnaui C. & R. Felder, 1860

= Laringa castelnaui =

Species of butterfly

Laringa castelnaui is a species of nymphalid butterfly found in the Indomalayan realm.

== Subspecies ==
- Laringa castelnaui castelnaui, the Blue Dandy, (southern Burma to Peninsular Malaya, possibly Singapore)
- Laringa castelnaui ochus Fruhstorfer (Borneo)
- Laringa castelnaui ottonis Fruhstorfer (Palawan)
- Laringa castelnaui niha Fruhstorfer (Nias)
- Laringa castelnaui fruhstorferi de Nicéville (eastern Java)

It ia a medium-sized, brown butterfly with lobed wings. Males may be metallic blue on the upper side.Asin other Biblidinae it is a tropical forest insect.
