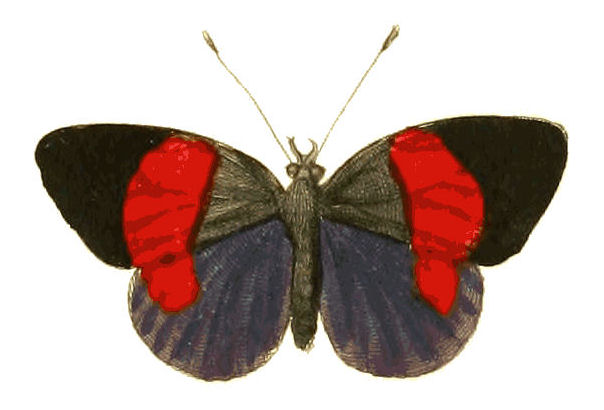
- Illustration by Dru Drury

Scientific classification
- Kingdom: Animalia
- Phylum: Arthropoda
- Clade: Pancrustacea
- Class: Insecta
- Order: Lepidoptera
- Family: Nymphalidae
- Tribe: Callicorini
- Genus: Haematera; Doubleday, [1849]
- Species: H. pyrame

Binomial name
- Haematera pyrame (Hübner, [1819])

Synonyms
- Callidula Hübner, [1819]; Papilio pyramus Fabricius, 1781 (preoccupied); Callidula pyrame Hübner, [1819]; Haematera thysbe Doubleday, [1849]; Haematera pyramus f. decolorata Köhler, 1923

= Haematera pyrame =

Sole species in brush-footed butterfly genus Haematera

Haematera pyrame is a South American species of butterflies belonging to the family Nymphalidae. It was first described by Johan Christian Fabricius in 1781 under the name Papilio pyramus, which was preoccupied (by the species now known as Tarsoctenus corytus). Jacob Hübner designated a slightly modified replacement name. As currently prescribed, it is the only species in the genus Haematera.

== Description ==
Upperside: Antennae brown. Thorax and abdomen dark brown. Anterior wings at the extremities black, but next the body red brown, the middle being occupied by a band which crosses them of a beautiful red, extending to the middle of the posterior ones, the remaining parts of which are of a fine blueish purple.

Underside: Palpi, legs, breast, and abdomen white. Anterior wings next the body yellowish brown, the tips the same. The red band is not so strong on this side as on the upper, neither does it extend to the inferior wings, but is bordered with black on that side near the tips. Posterior wings yellowish brown, prettily variegated with very small lighter marks and spots, with a small faint blueish indented line running along the external borders. Wingspan 1 5/8 inches (20 mm).

== Biology ==
The larvae of subspecies thysbe have been recorded feeding on Urvillea ulmacea.

== Subspecies ==
- Haematera pyrame pyrame (Brazil, Argentina)
- Haematera pyrame thysbe Doubleday, 1849 (Nicaragua to Colombia and Venezuela)
- Haematera pyrame rubra Kaye, 1904 (Trinidad)
