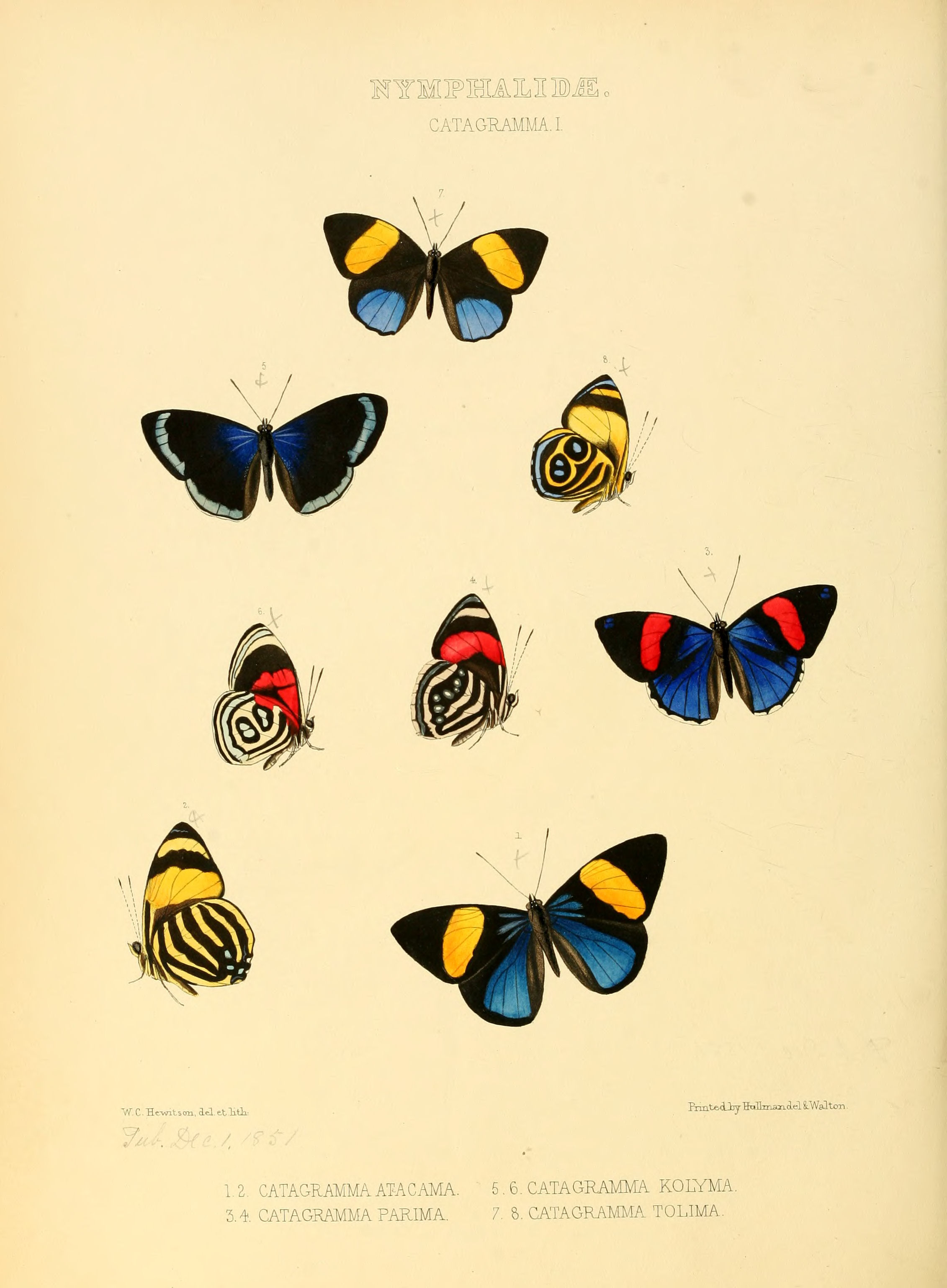
- Figures 5 and 6

Scientific classification
- Kingdom: Animalia
- Phylum: Arthropoda
- Class: Insecta
- Order: Lepidoptera
- Family: Nymphalidae
- Tribe: Callicorini
- Genus: Catacore; Dillon, 1948
- Species: C. kolyma

Binomial name
- Catacore kolyma (Hewitson, 1851)

Synonyms
- Catagramma kolyma Hewitson, 1851; Catagramma kolyma confluens Oberthür, 1916 (preocc. Oberthür, 1916); Catagramma kolyma connecens Talbot, 1928; Catagramma kolyma f. subobscura Niepelt, 1935; Catagramma pasithea Hewitson, 1864

= Catacore =

Kolyma eighty-eight

Monotypic brush-footed butterfly genus

Catacore kolyma, the Kolyma eighty-eight, is the only species in the genus Catacore. It is a member of the brush-footed butterfly family and is found in the Neotropical realm, ranging from Colombia to Peru.

== Subspecies ==
- C. k. kolyma (Ecuador, Peru, Brazil: Mato Grosso, Amazonas)
- C. k. pasithea (Hewitson, 1864) (Ecuador)
