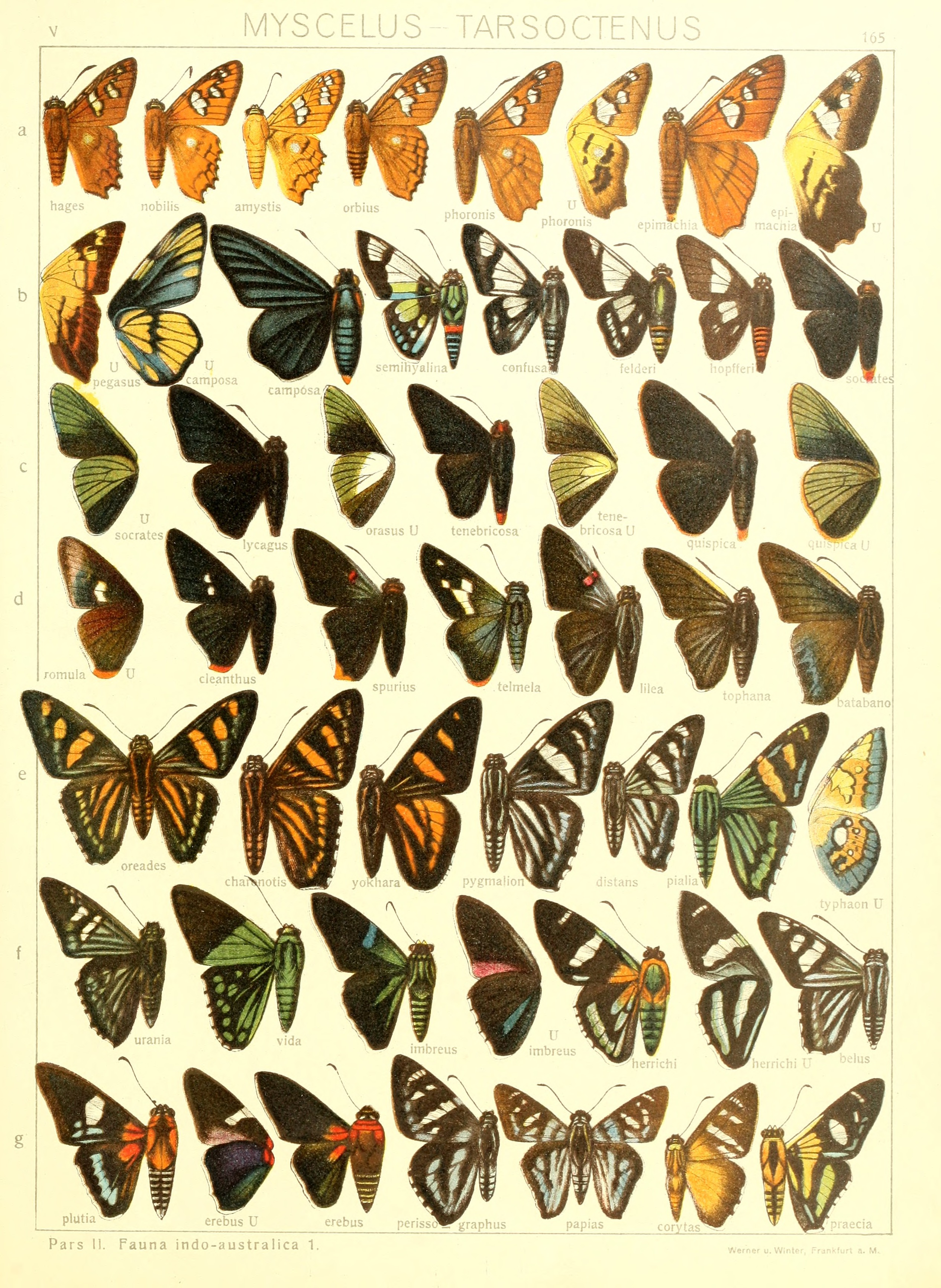
- Tarsoctenus species and related genera depicted in Adalbert Seitz's Macrolepidoptera of the World

Scientific classification
- Kingdom: Animalia
- Phylum: Arthropoda
- Class: Insecta
- Order: Lepidoptera
- Family: Hesperiidae
- Tribe: Entheini
- Genus: Tarsoctenus; Watson, 1893

= Tarsoctenus =

Genus of butterflies

Tarsoctenus is a genus of Neotropical butterflies in the family Hesperiidae, in which it is placed in tribe Entheini.

== Species ==
- Tarsoctenus corytus (Cramer, [1777]) Suriname to Colombia, Brazil (Amazonas)
  - T. corytus corytus Suriname
  - T. corytus corba Evans, 1952 Peru
  - T. corytus gaudialis (Hewitson, 1876) Panama
- Tarsoctenus papias (Hewitson, 1857) Brazil (Amazonas)
- Tarsoctenus praecia (Hewitson, 1857) Brazil
  - T. praecia praecia Brazil (Pará)
  - T. praecia plutia (Hewitson, 1857) Brazil (Amazonas)
  - T. praecia rufibasis Boullet, 1910 French Guiana
  - T. praecia luna Evans, 1952 Bolivia
