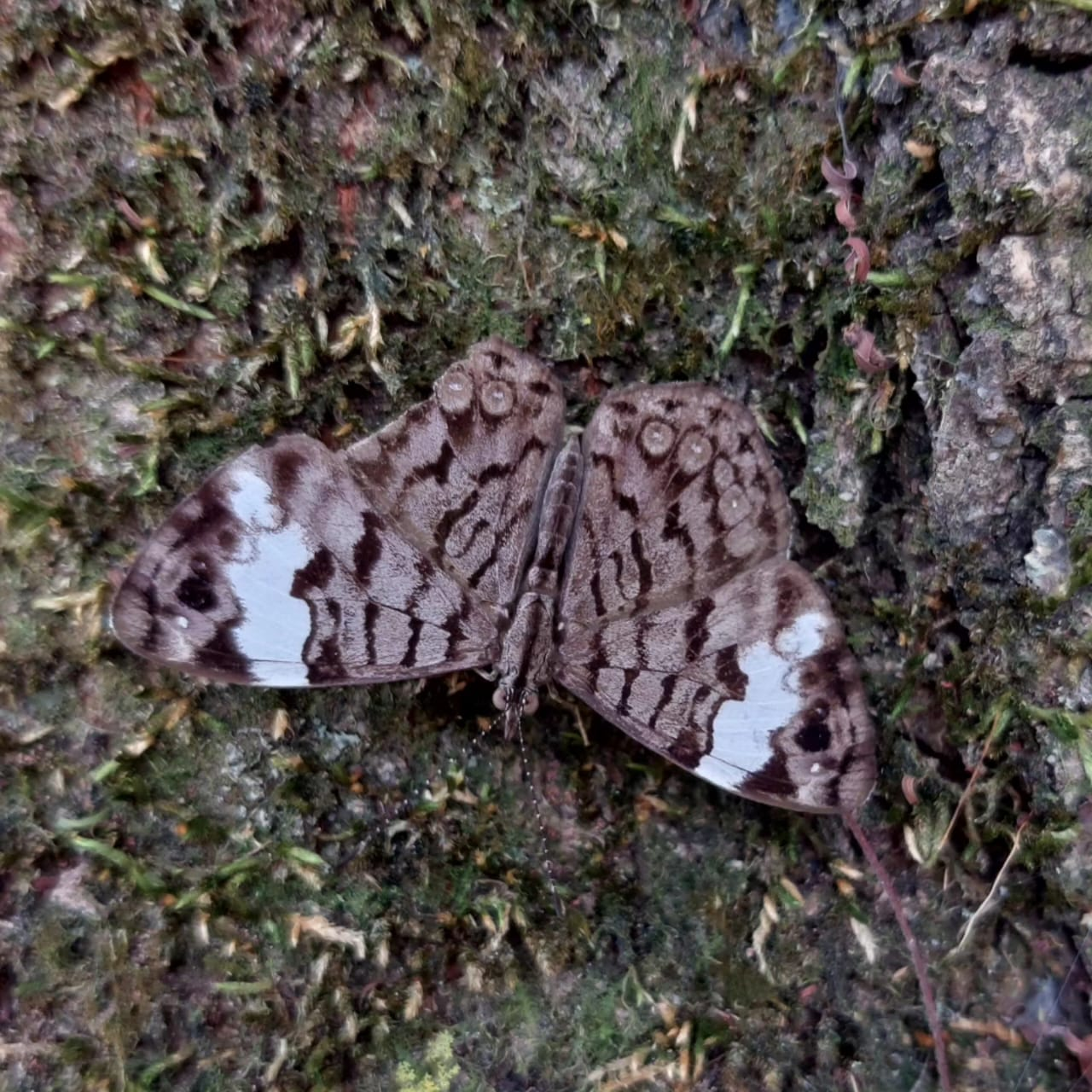

Scientific classification
- Domain: Eukaryota
- Kingdom: Animalia
- Phylum: Arthropoda
- Class: Insecta
- Order: Lepidoptera
- Family: Nymphalidae
- Genus: Ectima
- Species: E. thecla

Binomial name
- Ectima thecla Fabricius, 1796

Synonyms
- List: Papilio thecla Fabricius, 1796

= Ectima thecla =

Genus of brush-footed butterflies

Ectima thecla is a species of brush-footed butterfly found in Argentina, Bolivia, Brazil, Panama, Paraguay, Peru and Venezuela. It shows a similar behavior to the Hamadryas butterfly, but it does not produce the noise of "Cracker-butterflies".
