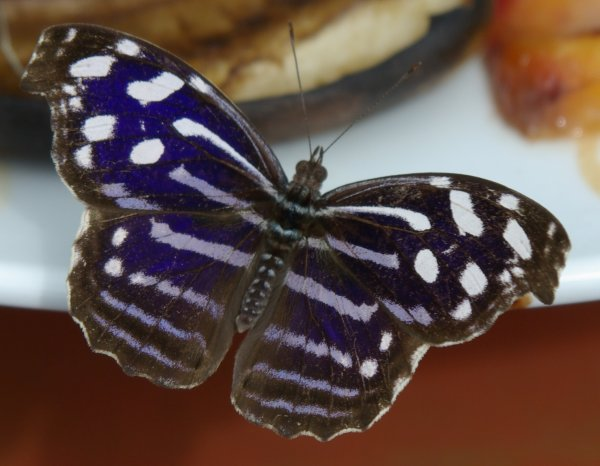
- Myscelia cyaniris: Epicaliini

Scientific classification
- Domain: Eukaryota
- Kingdom: Animalia
- Phylum: Arthropoda
- Class: Insecta
- Order: Lepidoptera
- Family: Nymphalidae
- Subfamily: Biblidinae; Boisduval, 1833

Tribes
- Ageroniini; Biblidini; Callicorini; Epicaliini; Epiphilini; Eubagini

Synonyms
- Eurytelinae

= Biblidinae =

Subfamily of the butterfly family Nymphalidae

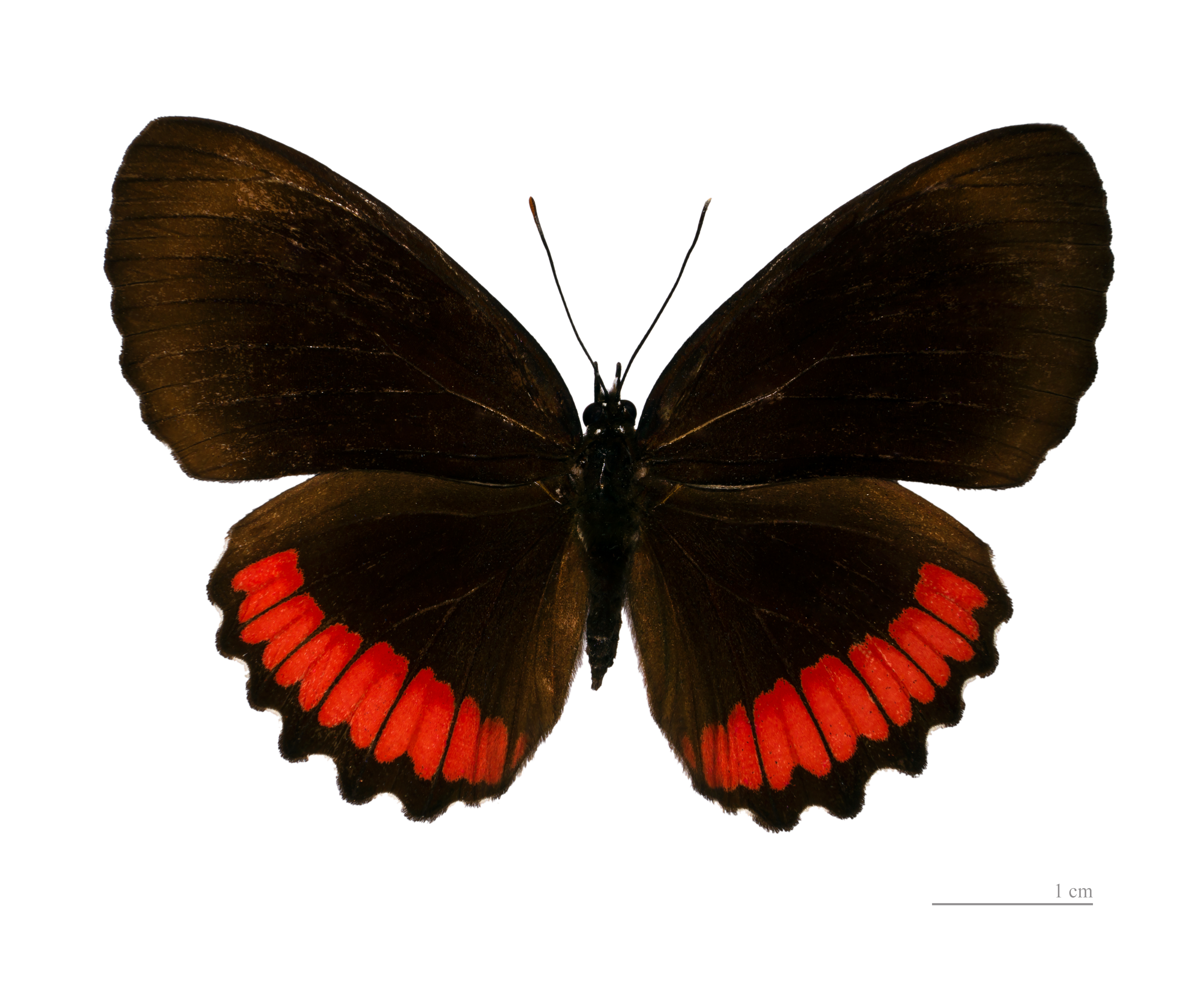
Red rim (Biblis hyperia: Biblidini)

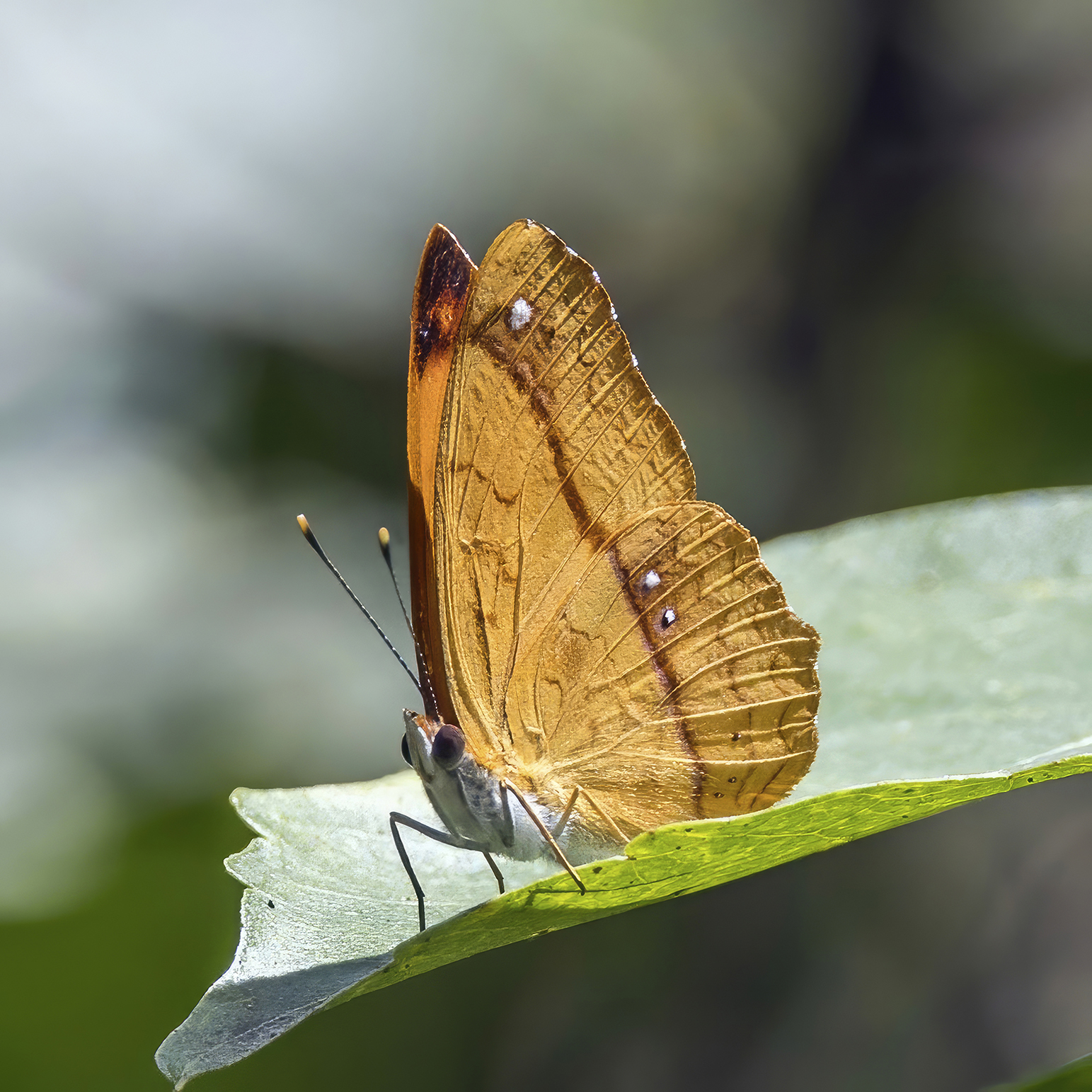
Little banner, Nica flavilla

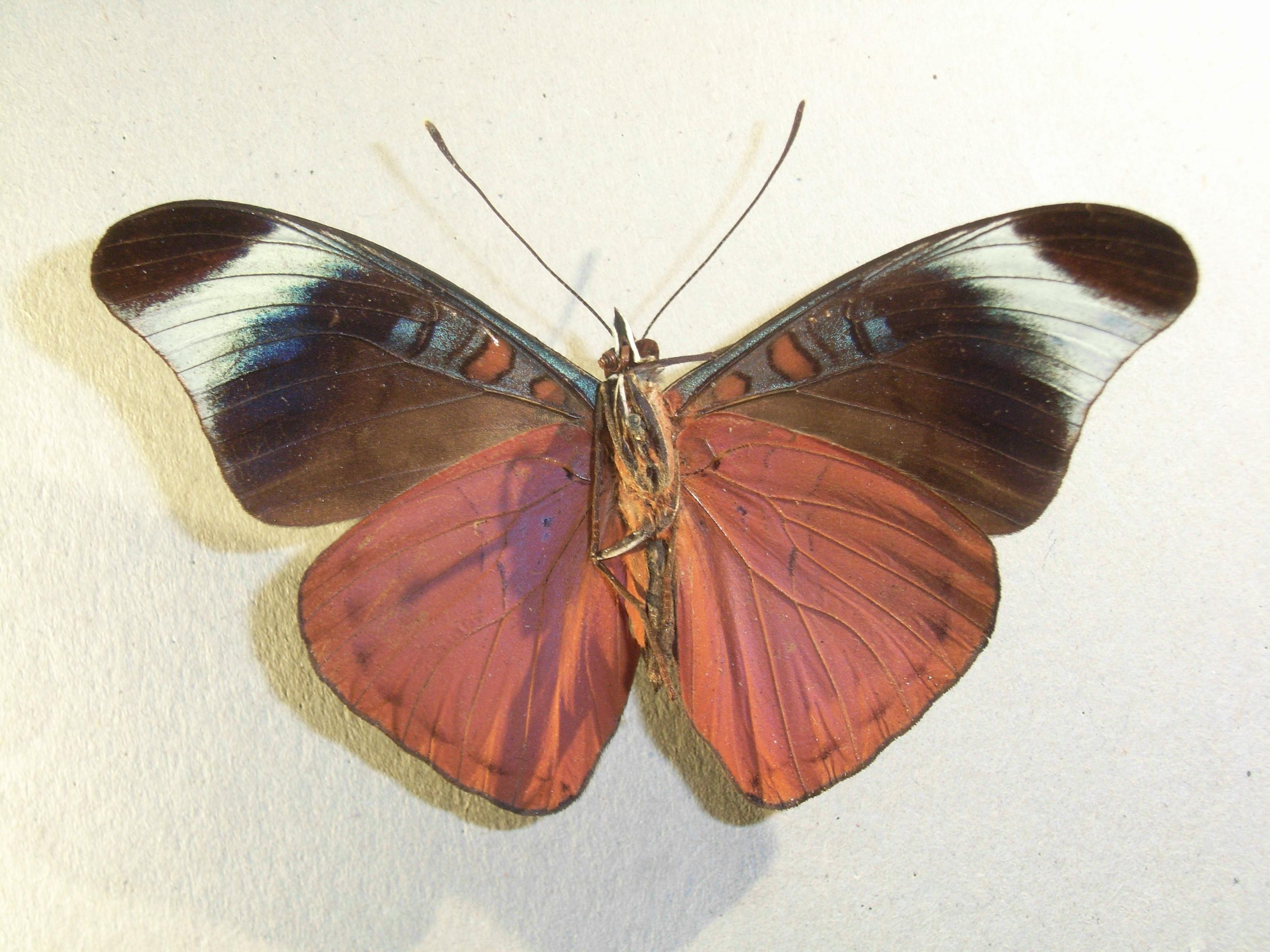
Panacea procilla: Ageroniini specimen underside

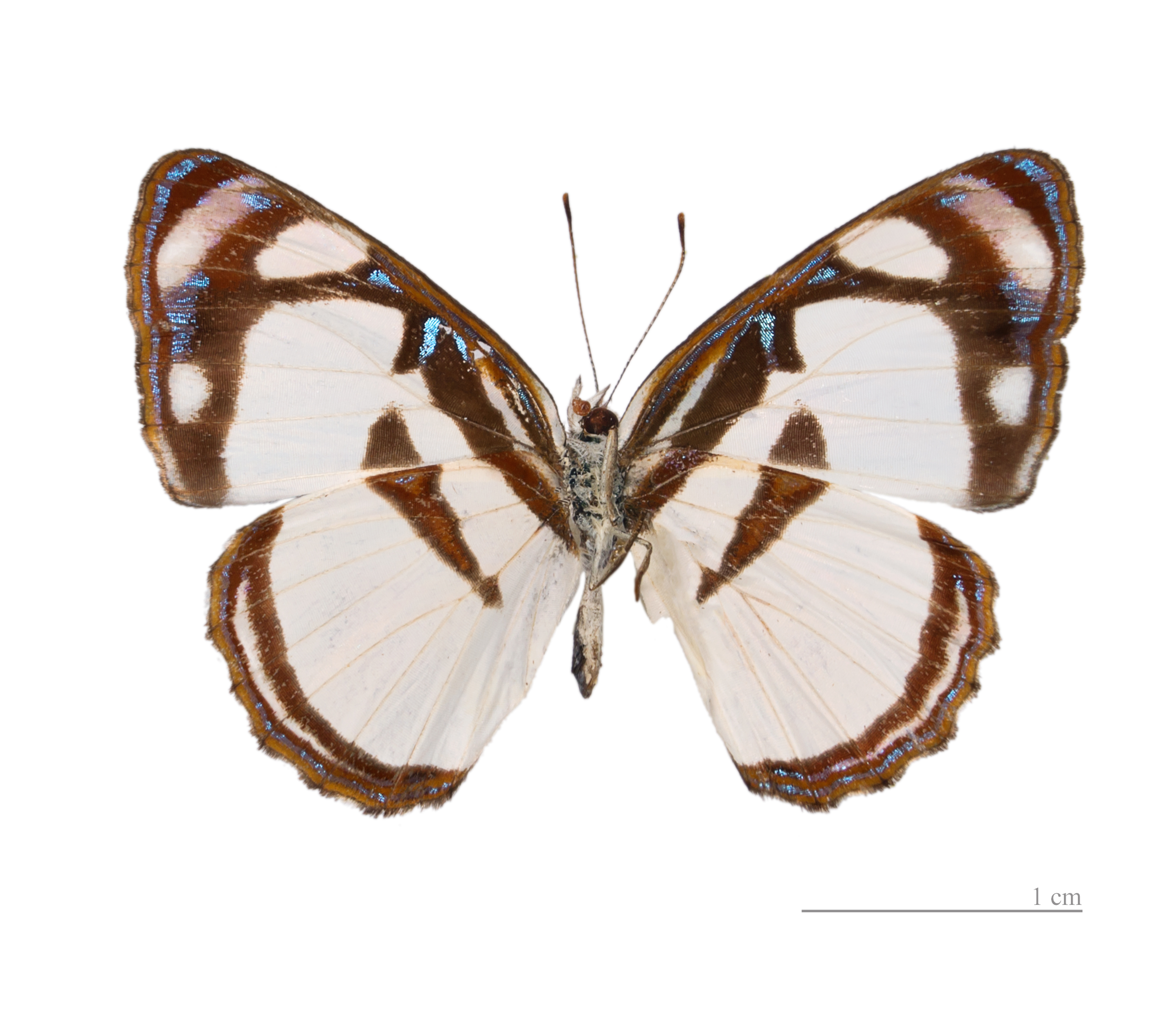
Dynamine athemon: Eubagini

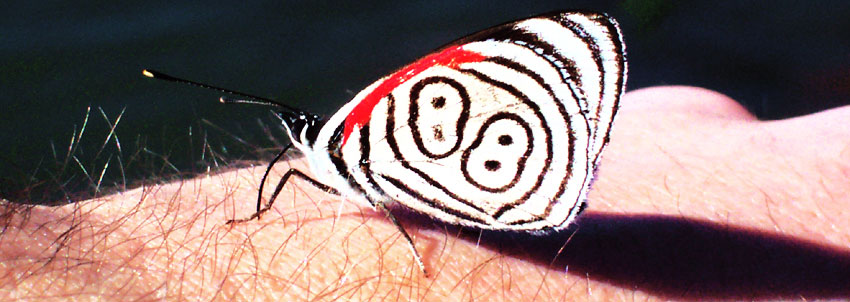
Diaethria clymena, one of the eighty-eights formerly in "Catagramma" (now Callicorini)

Biblidinae is a subfamily of nymphalid butterflies that includes the tropical brushfoots. This subfamily was sometimes merged within the Limenitidinae, but they are now recognized as quite distinct lineages. In older literature, this subfamily is sometimes called Eurytelinae.

As of 2008, some 340 valid species are in this subfamily, placed in 38 genera. Most species of Biblidinae are Neotropical, but there are some Old World species and genera in the tribes Biblidini and Epicaliini.

== Systematics ==
The Biblidinae are a taxonomically stable monophyletic group, at least since the "wastebin genus" Catagramma was dismantled around 1950.

The tribes, in the presumed phylogenetic sequence and with notable genera also listed here, are:

Biblidini Boisduval, 1833

- Biblis Fabricius, 1807 (= Zonaga)
- Ariadne Horsfield, 1829 (= Ergolis)
- Laringa Moore, 1901
- Eurytela Boisduval, 1833
- Neptidopsis Aurivillius, 1898
- Mesoxantha Aurivillius, 1898
- Byblia Hübner, 1819 (= Hypanis Boisduval, 1833 (non Pander in Menetries, 1832: preoccupied))
- Mestra Hübner, 1825 (= Cystineura)
- Archimestra Munroe, 1949
- Vila Kirby, 1871 (= Lonia, Neptis Hübner, 1819 (non Fabricius, 1807: preoccupied), Olina Doubleday, 1848 (non Robineau-Desvoidy, 1830: preoccupied))

Epicaliini Guenée, 1865

- Catonephele Hübner, [1819]
- Nessaea Hübner, [1819]
- Myscelia Doubleday, 1844 (= Sagaritis Hübner, 1821 (non Billberg, 1820: preoccupied), Sea)
- Sevenia Koçak, 1996 (= Crenis Boisduval, 1833 (non Hübner, 1821: preoccupied), Sallya Hemming, 1964 (non Yochelson, 1956: preoccupied))
- Eunica Hübner, [1819]
- Cybdelis Boisduval, 1836

Ageroniini Doubleday, 1847

- Hamadryas – cracker butterflies, calico butterflies
- Ectima Doubleday, 1848
- Panacea Godman & Salvin, 1883 (= Pandora Doubleday, 1848 (non Lamarck, 1799: preoccupied))
- Batesia Felder & Felder, 1862

Epiphilini Jenkins, 1987

- Asterope Hübner, [1819]
- Pyrrhogyra Hübner, 1819 (= Corybas)
- Epiphile Doubleday, 1844
- Lucinia Hübner, 1823 (= Autodea)
- Bolboneura Godman & Salvin, 1877
- Temenis Hübner, 1819 (= Callicorina, Paromia Hewitson, 1861 (non Westwood, 1851: preoccupied))
- Nica Hübner, 1826 (= Pseudonica)
- Peria Kirby, 1871 (= Pelia Doubleday, 1849 (non Bell, 1836: preoccupied))

Eubagini Burmeister, 1878

- Dynamine Hübner, 1819 (= Arisba, Eubagis, Sironia)

Callicorini Orfila, 1952 – eighty-eights and relatives

- Diaethria Billberg, 1820
- Callicore Hübner, [1819]
- Perisama Doubleday, 1849 (= Orophila)
- Antigonis Felder, 1861 (= Lincoya)
- Haematera Doubleday, 1849 (= Callidula)
- Catacore Dillon, 1948

== Sources ==
- Hill, R. I., Penz, C. M., & DeVries, P. J. (2002). Phylogenetic analysis and review of Panacea and Batesia butterflies (Nymphalidae). Journal of the Lepidopterists' Society, 56, 199-215.
- Jenkins, D. W. (1983). Neotropical Nymphalidae. I. Revision of Hamadryas. Bulletin of the Allyn Museum, 81, 1-146.
- Jenkins, D. W. (1984). Neotropical Nymphalidae. II. Revision of Myscelia. Bulletin of the Allyn Museum (Gainesville), 87, 1-64.
- Jenkins, D. W. (1985). Neotropical Nymphalidae. III. Revision of Catonephele. Bulletin of the Allyn Museum of Entomology, 92, 1-65.
- Jenkins, D. W. (1985). Neotropical Nymphalidae. IV. Revision of Ectima. Bulletin of the Allyn Museum (Gainesville), 95, 1-30.
- Jenkins, D. W. (1986). Neotropical Nymphalidae. V. Revision of Epiphile. Bulletin of the Allyn Museum (Gainesville), 101, 1-70.
- Jenkins, D. W. (1987). Neotropical Nymphalidae. VI. Revision of Asterope (=Callithea Auct.). Bulletin of the Allyn Museum of Entomology, 114, 1-66.
- Jenkins, D. W. (1989). Neotropical Nymphalidae. VII. Revision of Nessaea. Bulletin of the Allyn Museum (Gainesville), 125, 1-38.
- Jenkins, D. W. (1990). Neotropical Nymphalidae. VIII. Revision of Eunica. Bulletin of the Allyn Museum, 131, 1-177.
