= Ectima =

- Ectima and other Biblidinae

Scientific classification
- Kingdom: Animalia
- Phylum: Arthropoda
- Clade: Pancrustacea
- Class: Insecta
- Order: Lepidoptera
- Family: Nymphalidae
- Tribe: Ageroniini
- Genus: Ectima; Doubleday, [1848]

Species
- See text

Genus of brush-footed butterflies

Ectima is a brush-footed butterfly genus found in South America.

== Species ==
Listed alphabetically:

- Ectima erycinoides (C. & R. Felder, 1867)
- Ectima iona (Doubleday, 1848)
- Ectima lirides (Staudinger, 1885)
- Ectima thecla (Fabricius, 1796)
