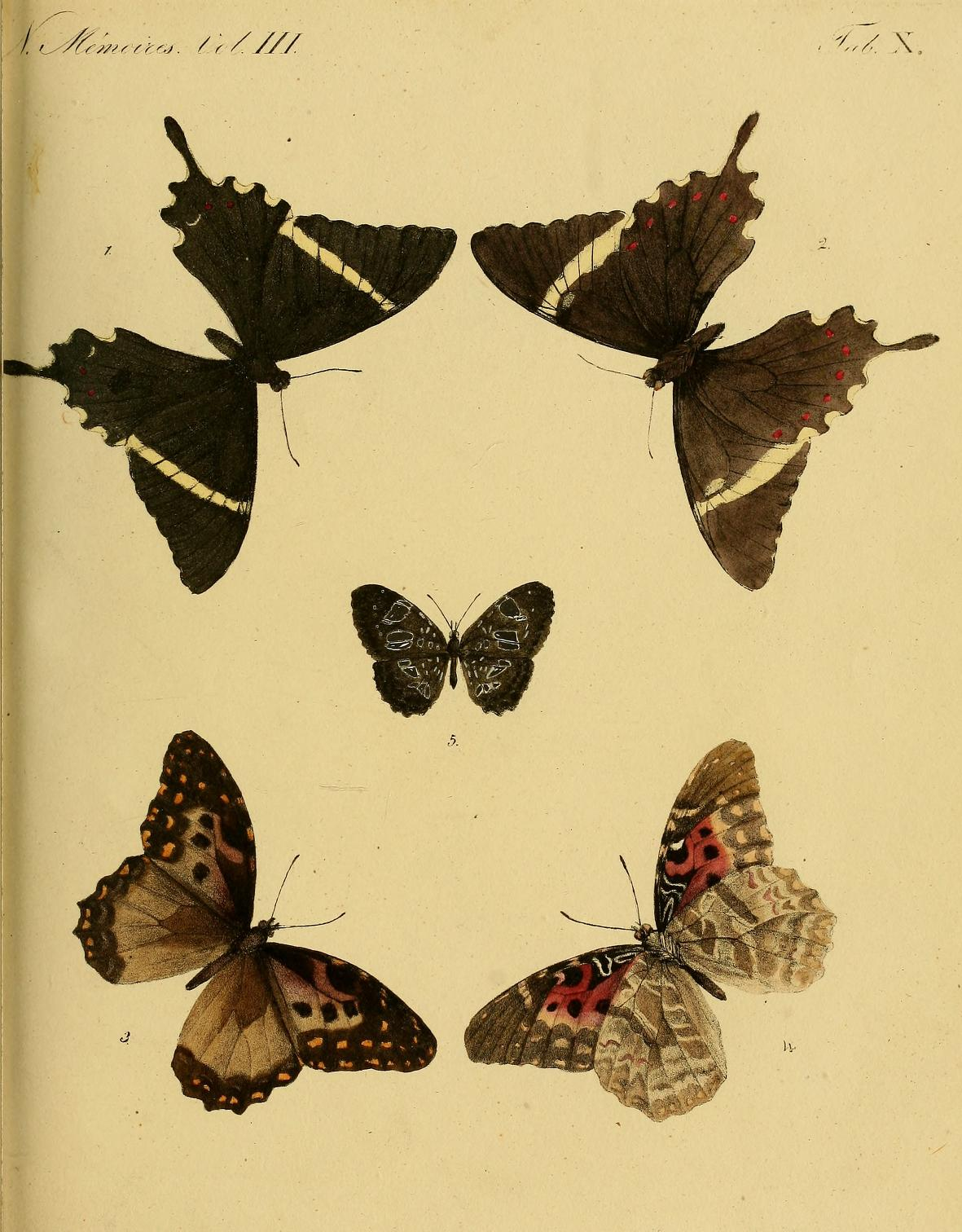
- Figure 5 Nouveaux Memoires Soc. Imp. Nat. Moscou Ménétriés

Scientific classification
- Kingdom: Animalia
- Phylum: Arthropoda
- Clade: Pancrustacea
- Class: Insecta
- Order: Lepidoptera
- Family: Nymphalidae
- Tribe: Biblidini
- Genus: Archimestra; Munroe, 1949
- Species: A. teleboas

Binomial name
- Archimestra teleboas (Ménétriés, 1832)

Synonyms
- Argynnis teleboas Ménétriés, 1832; Mestra teleboas

= Archimestra =

Monotypic brush-footed butterfly genus

Archimestra is a monotypic genus of nymphalid butterfly. It contains only one species, Archimestra teleboas, which is endemic to Haiti and the Dominican Republic. Although wide-spread, these butterflies may be absent from large areas in the eastern part of the Dominican Republic and the Tiburón peninsula of Haiti.

The length of the forewings is 19–25 mm for males and 21–26 mm for females. Wings appear dark brown to black with white spot and strip accents. Some may also have an orange tint or an orange spot on the abdomen.

While the larvae have not been heavily documented, they have been reared before on Tragia. Mature individuals have been seen landing on Heliotropium indicum, Spermacoce remota, and Chromolaena odorata.
