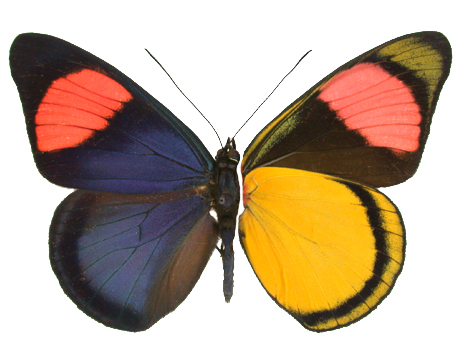
- Batesia hypochlora. Dorsal view (left) and ventral view (right)

Scientific classification
- Domain: Eukaryota
- Kingdom: Animalia
- Phylum: Arthropoda
- Class: Insecta
- Order: Lepidoptera
- Family: Nymphalidae
- Tribe: Ageroniini
- Genus: Batesia; C. & R. Felder, 1862
- Species: B. hypochlora

Binomial name
- Batesia hypochlora C. & R. Felder, 1862

Synonyms
- Batesia hemichrysa Salvin & Godman, 1868; Batesia hypochlora chrysocantha Fruhstorfer, 1915

= Batesia hypochlora =

Monotypic brush-footed butterfly genus

Batesia is a monotypic butterfly genus of the family Nymphalidae. It contains only Batesia hypochlora, the painted beauty or also known as the pastel papillion.

== Subspecies ==
- Batesia hypochlora hypochlora (Peru)
- Batesia hypochlora hypoxantha Salvin & Godman, 1868 (Peru, Ecuador)

== Distribution ==
This species is found in the upper Amazon areas of Brazil, Ecuador and Peru.

== Description ==
Batesia hypochlora can reach a wingspan of 85–95 mm. The upperside of the wings is blue, with a submarginal band of the same color surrounding the outer margin of the hindwings. On the forewings there is a large pink patch.
