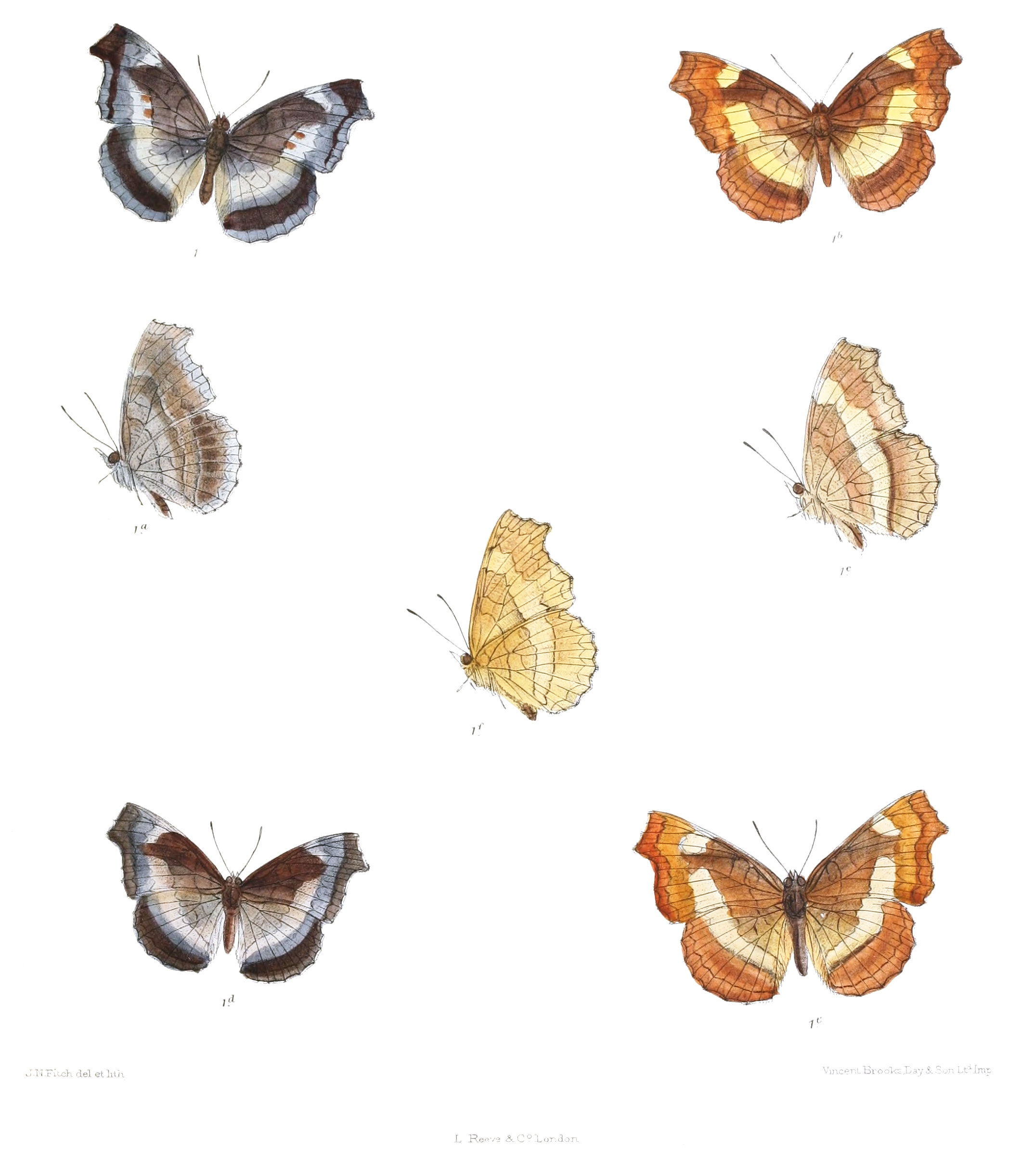
- Laringa horsfieldii andamanensis

Scientific classification
- Domain: Eukaryota
- Kingdom: Animalia
- Phylum: Arthropoda
- Class: Insecta
- Order: Lepidoptera
- Family: Nymphalidae
- Tribe: Biblidini
- Genus: Laringa; Moore, [1901]

= Laringa =

Genus of brush-footed butterflies

Laringa is a genus of nymphalid butterfly found in South-east Asia.

== Species ==
- Laringa horsfieldii (Boisduval, 1833) India, Andamans, Java, Sumatra Burma, Thailand, North Peninsular Malaya
- Laringa castelnaui (C. & R. Felder, 1860) Malaysia, Borneo, Philippines, Sumatra. Java, Palawan, Nias
