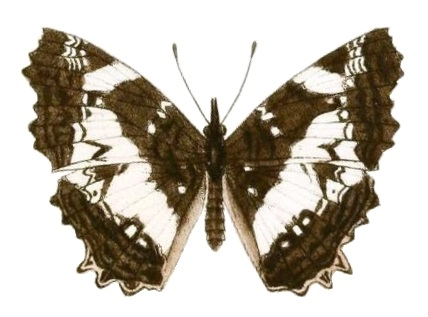
- Neptidopsis fulgurata fulgurata

Scientific classification
- Domain: Eukaryota
- Kingdom: Animalia
- Phylum: Arthropoda
- Class: Insecta
- Order: Lepidoptera
- Family: Nymphalidae
- Tribe: Biblidini
- Genus: Neptidopsis; Aurivillius, 1898

= Neptidopsis =

False sailers

Genus of brush-footed butterflies

Neptidopsis is a genus of nymphalid butterflies found in Africa, commonly called false sailers or sailors.

== Species ==
Listed alphabetically:

- Neptidopsis fulgurata (Boisduval, 1833) – barred false sailer (East Africa and Madagascar)
- Neptidopsis ophione (Cramer, [1777]) – scalloped false sailer (sub-Saharan Africa)
