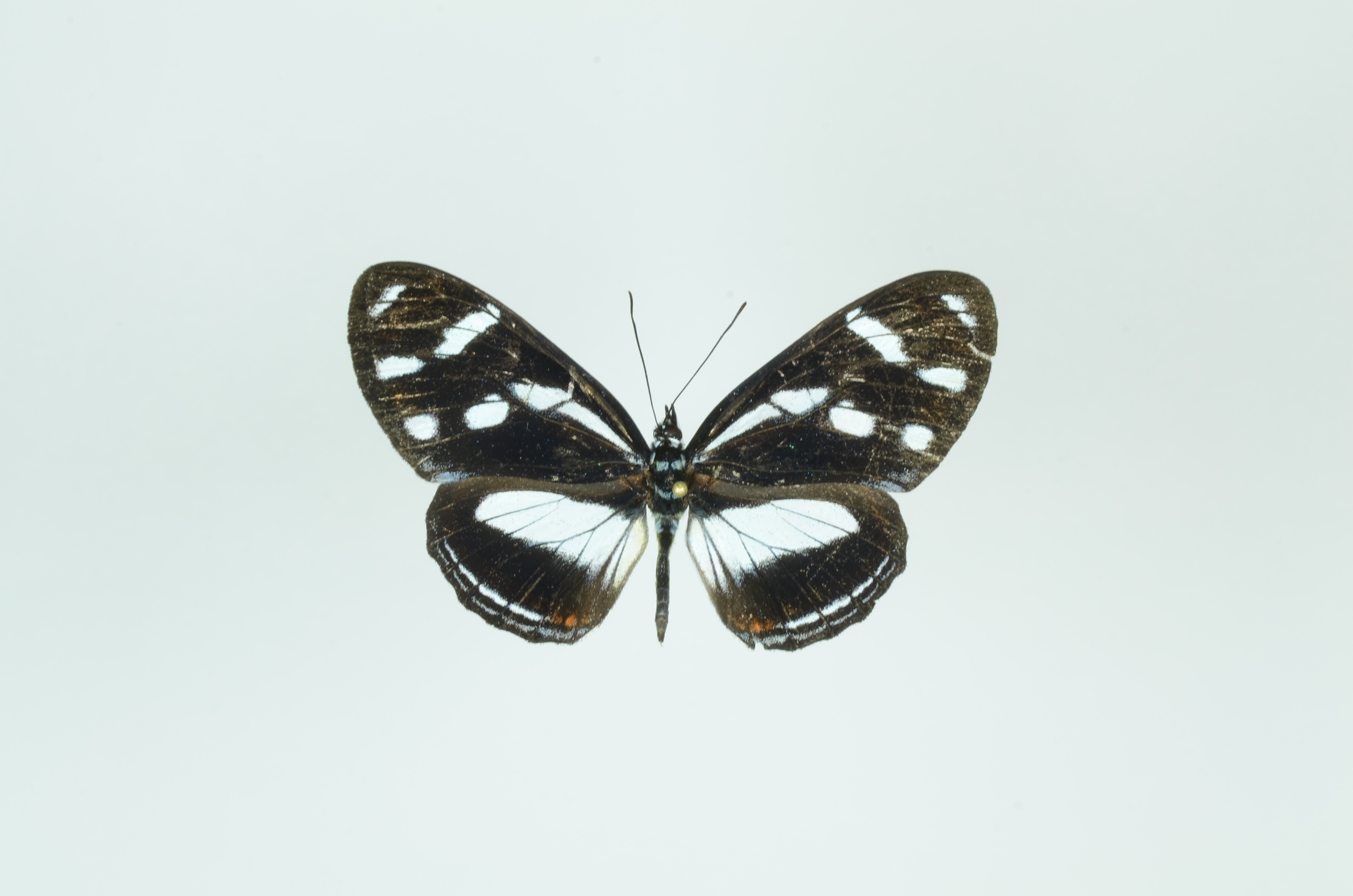

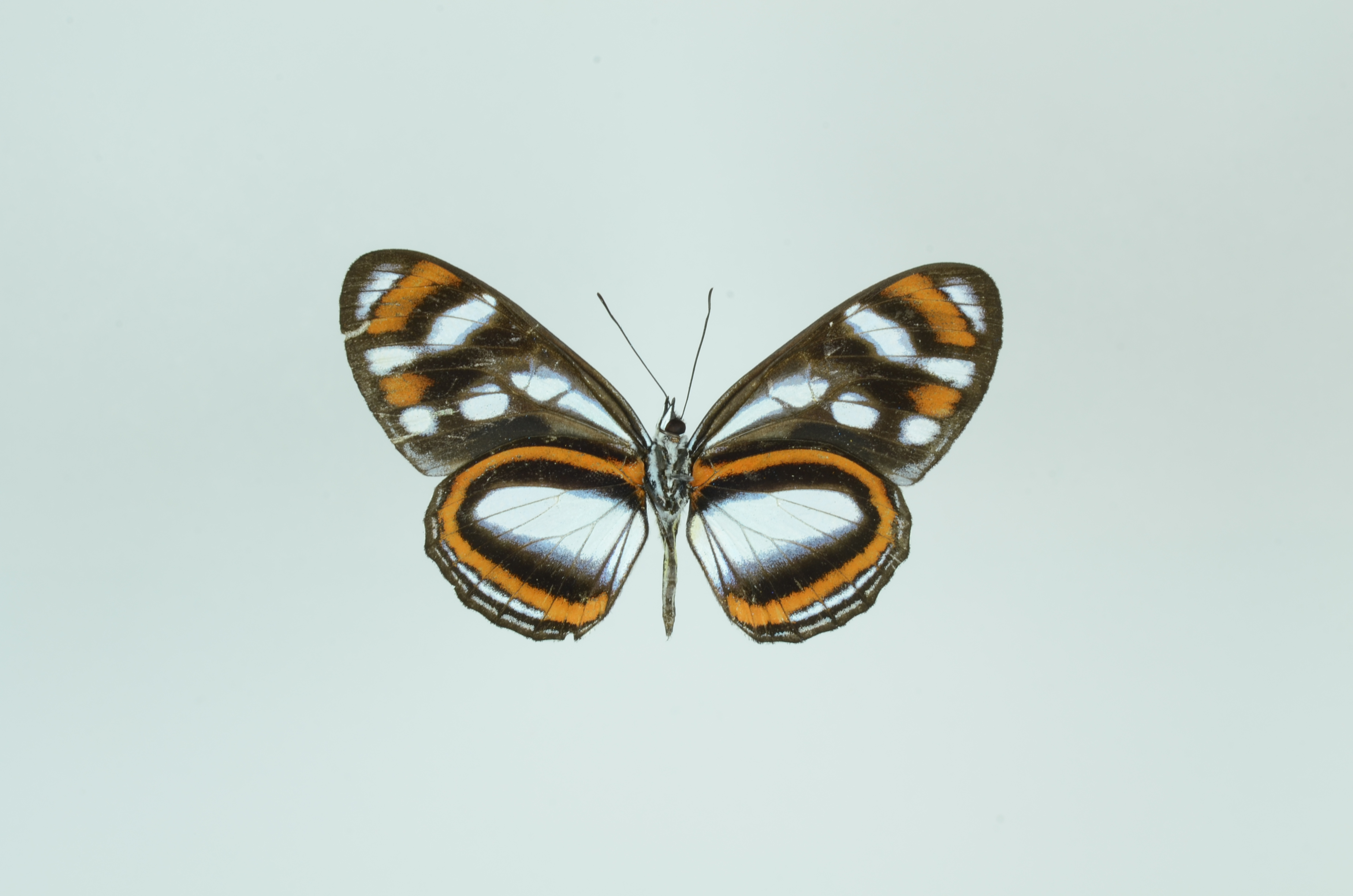

Scientific classification
- Domain: Eukaryota
- Kingdom: Animalia
- Phylum: Arthropoda
- Class: Insecta
- Order: Lepidoptera
- Family: Nymphalidae
- Genus: Vila
- Species: V. azeca

Binomial name
- Vila azeca (Doubleday, [1848])

Synonyms
- Olina azeca Doubleday, [1848]; Olina azeca Westwood, [1851]; Olina azeca mariana Bates, 1865; Olina azeca stalachtoides Bates, 1865; Vila semistalachtis Hall, 1928

= Vila azeca =

Azeca banner

Species of butterfly

Vila azeca, the azeca banner, is a species of butterfly of the family Nymphalidae. It is found in the Amazonian region from Colombia to Bolivia. The habitat consists of lowland rainforests at altitudes below 800 meters.

Adults have been recorded imbibing mineralised moisture from rocks or riverbeds.

== Subspecies ==
- Vila azeca azeca (Bolivia)
- Vila azeca mariana (Bates, 1865) (Brazil: Amazonas)
- Vila azeca stalachtoides (Bates, 1865) (Brazil: Amazonas)
- Vila azeca cacica Staudinger, 1886 (Ecuador)
- Vila azeca semistalachtis Hall, 1928 (Colombia)
