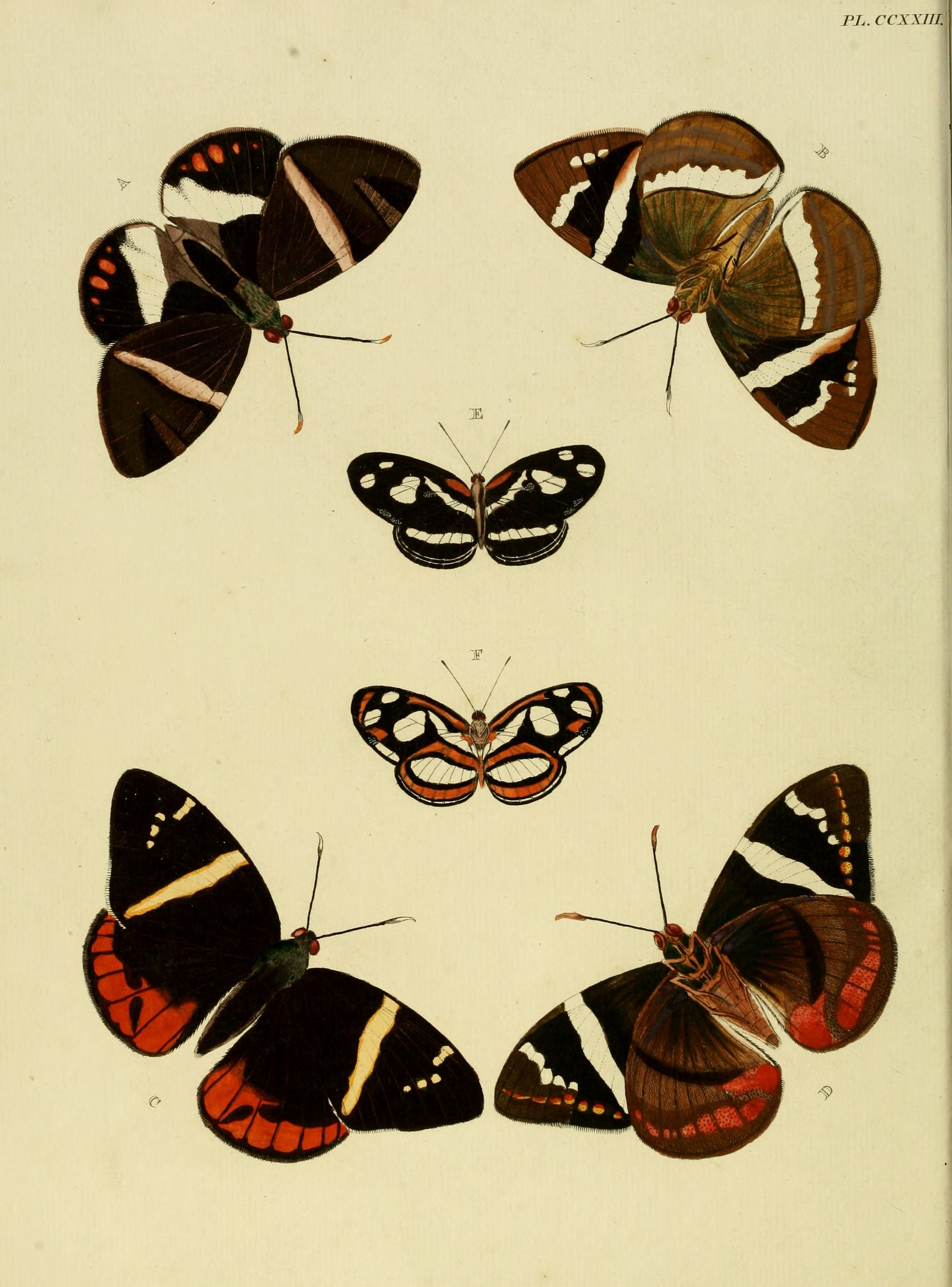
- Vila emilia in Pieter Cramer's Uitlandsche Kapellen (E, F)

Scientific classification
- Domain: Eukaryota
- Kingdom: Animalia
- Phylum: Arthropoda
- Class: Insecta
- Order: Lepidoptera
- Family: Nymphalidae
- Tribe: Biblidini
- Genus: Vila; Kirby, 1871

Synonyms
- Neptis Hübner, [1819]; Olina Doubleday, [1848]; Lonia d'Almeida, [1946]

= Vila (butterfly) =

Genus of brush-footed butterflies

Vila is a genus of nymphalid butterfly found in northern South America.

== Species ==
Listed alphabetically:

- Vila azeca (Doubleday, [1848])
- Vila emilia (Cramer, [1779])
- Vila eueidiformis Joicey & Talbot, 1918
