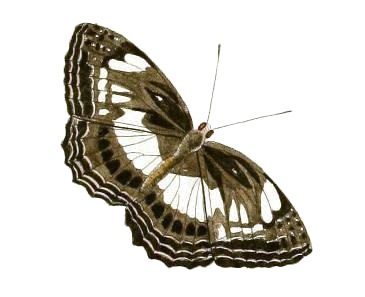

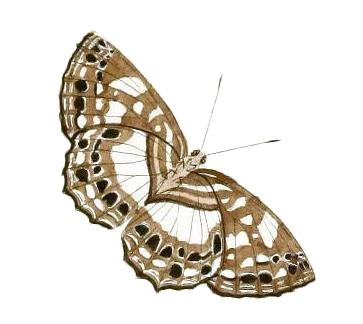

Conservation status
- Least Concern (IUCN 3.1)

Scientific classification
- Kingdom: Animalia
- Phylum: Arthropoda
- Clade: Pancrustacea
- Class: Insecta
- Order: Lepidoptera
- Family: Nymphalidae
- Genus: Neptidopsis
- Species: N. ophione

Binomial name
- Neptidopsis ophione (Cramer, 1777)

Synonyms
- Papilio ophione Cramer, 1777; Papilio valentina Cramer, 1780; Eurytela morgani Doubleday, 1848; Eurytela velleda Mabille, 1890; Neptidopsis ophione var. nucleata Grünberg, 1911

= Neptidopsis ophione =

Scalloped false sailer

Species of butterfly

Neptidopsis ophione, the scalloped false sailer or scalloped sailer (also spelled "sailor"), is a butterfly in the family Nymphalidae. It is found in Guinea, Sierra Leone, Liberia, Ivory Coast, Ghana, Togo, Benin, Nigeria, Cameroon, Equatorial Guinea, Gabon, the Republic of the Congo, Angola, the Democratic Republic of the Congo, Uganda, Sudan, Ethiopia, Kenya, Tanzania, Malawi, Zambia, Mozambique and Zimbabwe. The habitat consists of forest edges, secondary forest and dense woodland. They are on wing from January to September.

The larvae feed on Tragia species T. benthami, T. brevipes, T. impedita and probably also Ricinus species.

== Subspecies ==
- Neptidopsis ophione ophione — Guinea, Sierra Leone, Liberia, Ivory Coast, Ghana, Togo, Benin, Nigeria: south and the Cross River loop, Cameroon, Bioko, Gabon, Congo
- Neptidopsis ophione nucleata Grünberg, 1911 — northern Angola, Democratic Republic of the Congo, Uganda, southern Sudan, Ethiopia, Kenya, Tanzania, Malawi, Zambia, Mozambique, eastern Zimbabwe

Torben Larsen developed a species numbering system for his 2005 publication Butterflies of West Africa. The nominate subspecies is #833. The 'Larsen' numbers have since been used with permission in A Sharp Eye on Butterflies of Ghana.
