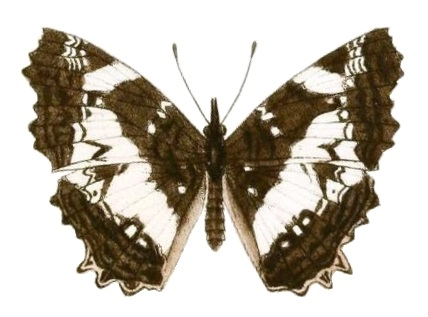
- Neptidopsis fulgurata fulgurata

Scientific classification
- Domain: Eukaryota
- Kingdom: Animalia
- Phylum: Arthropoda
- Class: Insecta
- Order: Lepidoptera
- Family: Nymphalidae
- Genus: Neptidopsis
- Species: N. fulgurata

Binomial name
- Neptidopsis fulgurata (Boisduval, 1833)

Synonyms
- Libythea fulgurata Boisduval, 1833; Neptidopsis fulgurata ab. pseudoplatyptera Strand, 1912

= Neptidopsis fulgurata =

Barred false sailer

Species of butterfly

Neptidopsis fulgurata, the barred false sailer or Malagasy sailer, is a butterfly in the family Nymphalidae. It is found in Kenya, Tanzania, Mozambique and Madagascar. The habitat consists of coastal forests and coastal forest-savanna mosaic.

Adults are attracted to fermented bananas and have been recorded feeding from the tips of tall grass. They are on wing from April to September.

== Subspecies ==
- Neptidopsis fulgurata fulgurata — Madagascar
- Neptidopsis fulgurata platyptera Rothschild & Jordan, 1903 — Kenya, Tanzania and Mozambique
