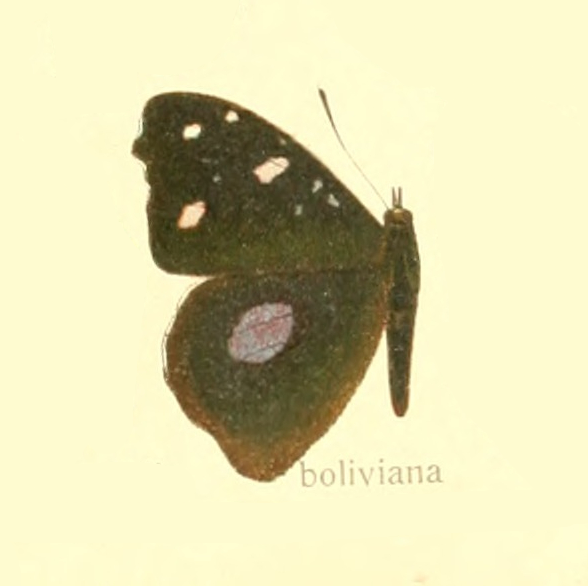

Scientific classification
- Domain: Eukaryota
- Kingdom: Animalia
- Phylum: Arthropoda
- Class: Insecta
- Order: Lepidoptera
- Family: Nymphalidae
- Genus: Cybdelis
- Species: C. boliviana

Binomial name
- Cybdelis boliviana (Salvin, 1869)

Synonyms
- Cybdelis peruviana Staudinger, 1886

= Cybdelis boliviana =

Species of butterfly

Cybdelis boliviana, the Bolivian banner or Salvin's empress is a butterfly in the family Nymphalidae. It occurs in Peru, Bolivia, and Ecuador. C. boliviana can be distinguished from the other butterflies in the genus Cybdelis by a large central blue patch on the hindwing. The host plant and immature stages of C. boliviana is unknown.
