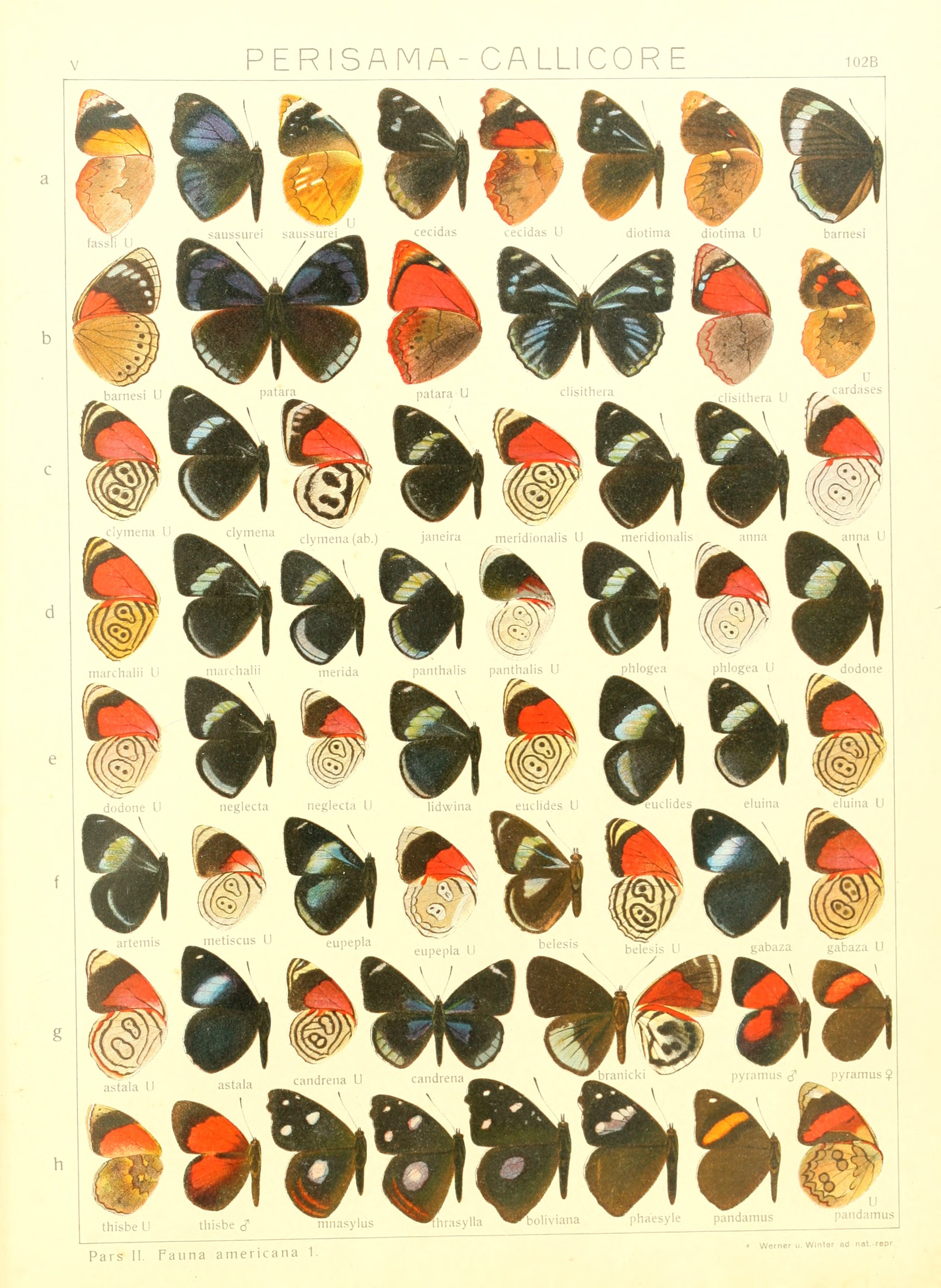
- Adalbert Seitz row h

Scientific classification
- Kingdom: Animalia
- Phylum: Arthropoda
- Class: Insecta
- Order: Lepidoptera
- Family: Nymphalidae
- Tribe: Epicaliini
- Genus: Cybdelis; Boisduval, [1836]

= Cybdelis =

Genus of brush-footed butterflies

Cybdelis is a nymphalid butterfly genus found in South America.

== Species ==
Listed alphabetically:

- Cybdelis boliviana Salvin, 1869
- Cybdelis mnasylus Doubleday, 1844
- Cybdelis phaesyle Hübner, 1831
