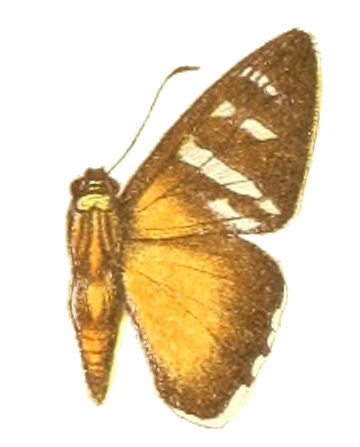
- Depicted in Adalbert Seitz's Macrolepidoptera of the World

Scientific classification
- Kingdom: Animalia
- Phylum: Arthropoda
- Class: Insecta
- Order: Lepidoptera
- Family: Hesperiidae
- Genus: Tarsoctenus
- Species: T. corytus

Binomial name
- Tarsoctenus corytus (Cramer, [1777])

Synonyms
- Papilio corytus Cramer, [1777]; Papilio pyramus Cramer, 1779; Erycides gaudialis Hewitson, 1876; Erycides perissographus Mabille, 1889; Tarsoctenus dubius Draudt, 1921

= Tarsoctenus corytus =

Species of butterfly

Tarsoctenus corytus is a Neotropical species of butterfly in the family Hesperiidae. It was described by Pieter Cramer from Suriname, in Volume II of De uitlandsche Kapellen published posthumously in 1779.

== Subspecies ==
- Tarsoctenus corytus corytus (Suriname)
- Tarsoctenus corytus corba Evans, 1952 (Peru)
- Tarsoctenus corytus gaudialis (Hewitson, 1876) (Panama)
