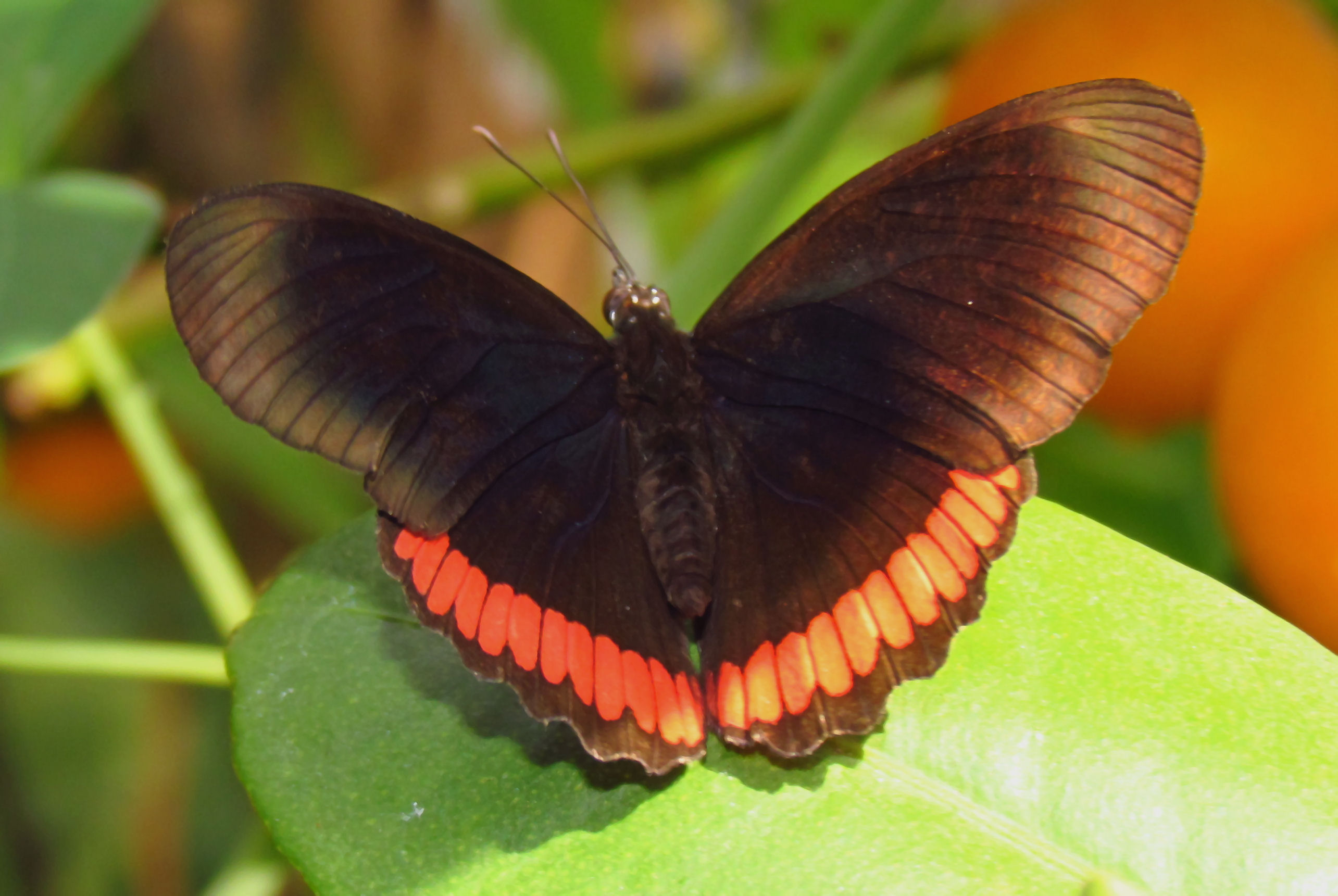
- Dorsal view
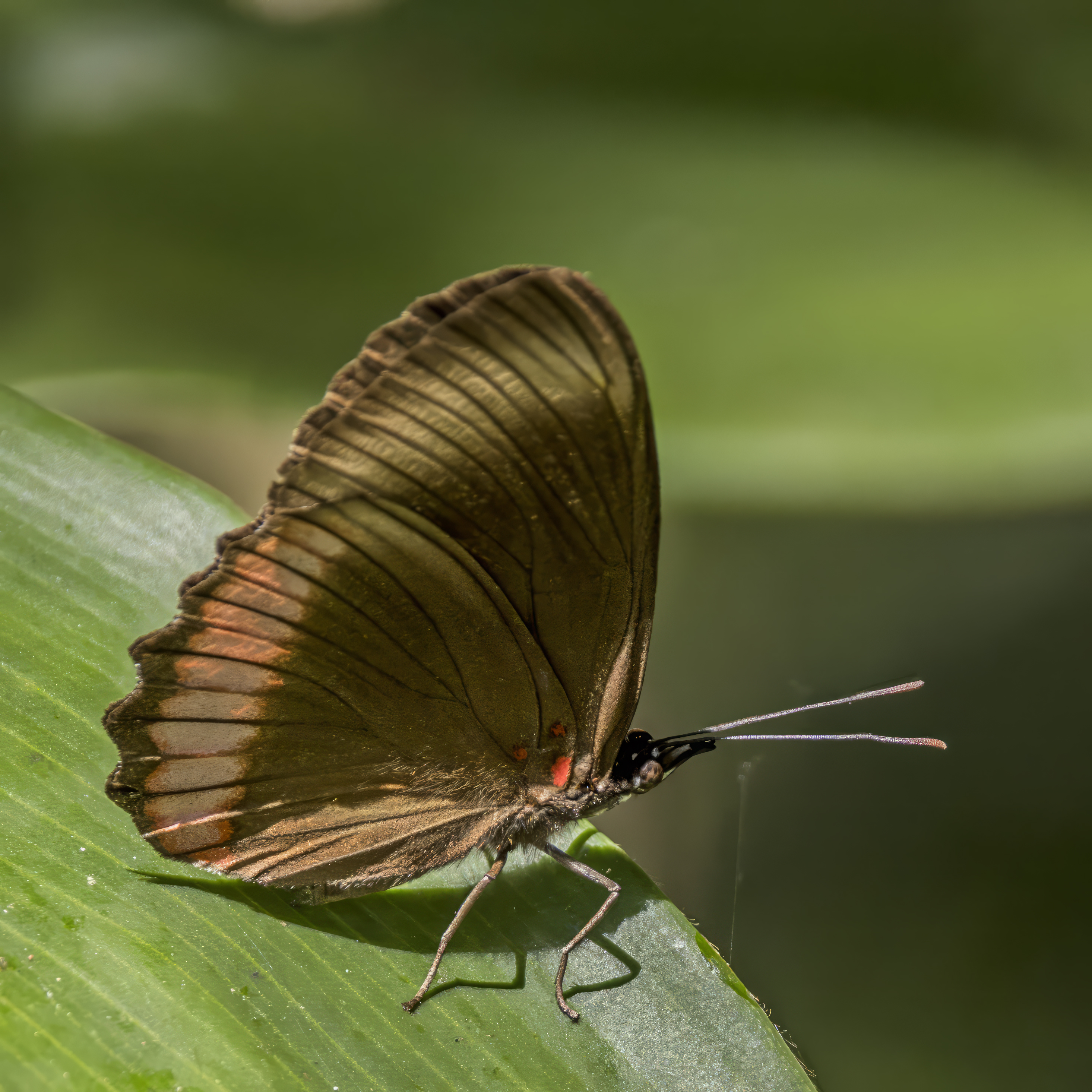
- Underside

Scientific classification
- Kingdom: Animalia
- Phylum: Arthropoda
- Class: Insecta
- Order: Lepidoptera
- Family: Nymphalidae
- Genus: Biblis Fabricius, 1807
- Species: B. hyperia

Binomial name
- Biblis hyperia (Cramer, 1779)

Synonyms
- Genus: Zonaga Billberg, 1820; Zonagra Sherborn, 1932; Species: Papilio hyperia; Didonis biblis Godman & Salvin, [1883]

= Biblis hyperia =

Species of butterfly

Biblis hyperia, the red rim or crimson-banded black, is a species of brush-footed butterfly (family Nymphalidae) that is native to the lower Rio Grande Valley of Texas in the United States, Mexico, the Caribbean, Central America, and South America as far south as Paraguay. Its genus Biblis is so far monotypic, but at least one other undescribed species is suspected to exist.

They can be seen flying between March and November in subtropical forest. The immature larvae feed on Tragia volubilis.

== Description ==
Adults have a velvety-black forewing with a gray hindwing. The hindwing has a pinkish-red band. The caterpillars of this species are gray brown with raised green marks and spikes. 1342

== Subspecies ==
Listed alphabetically:

- B. h. aganisa Boisduval, 1836
- B. h. hyperia (Cramer, [1779])
- B. h. laticlavia (Thieme, 1904)
- B. h. nectanabis (Fruhstorfer, 1909)
- B. h. pacifica (Hall, 1928)

An unnamed species has been identified in Peru.

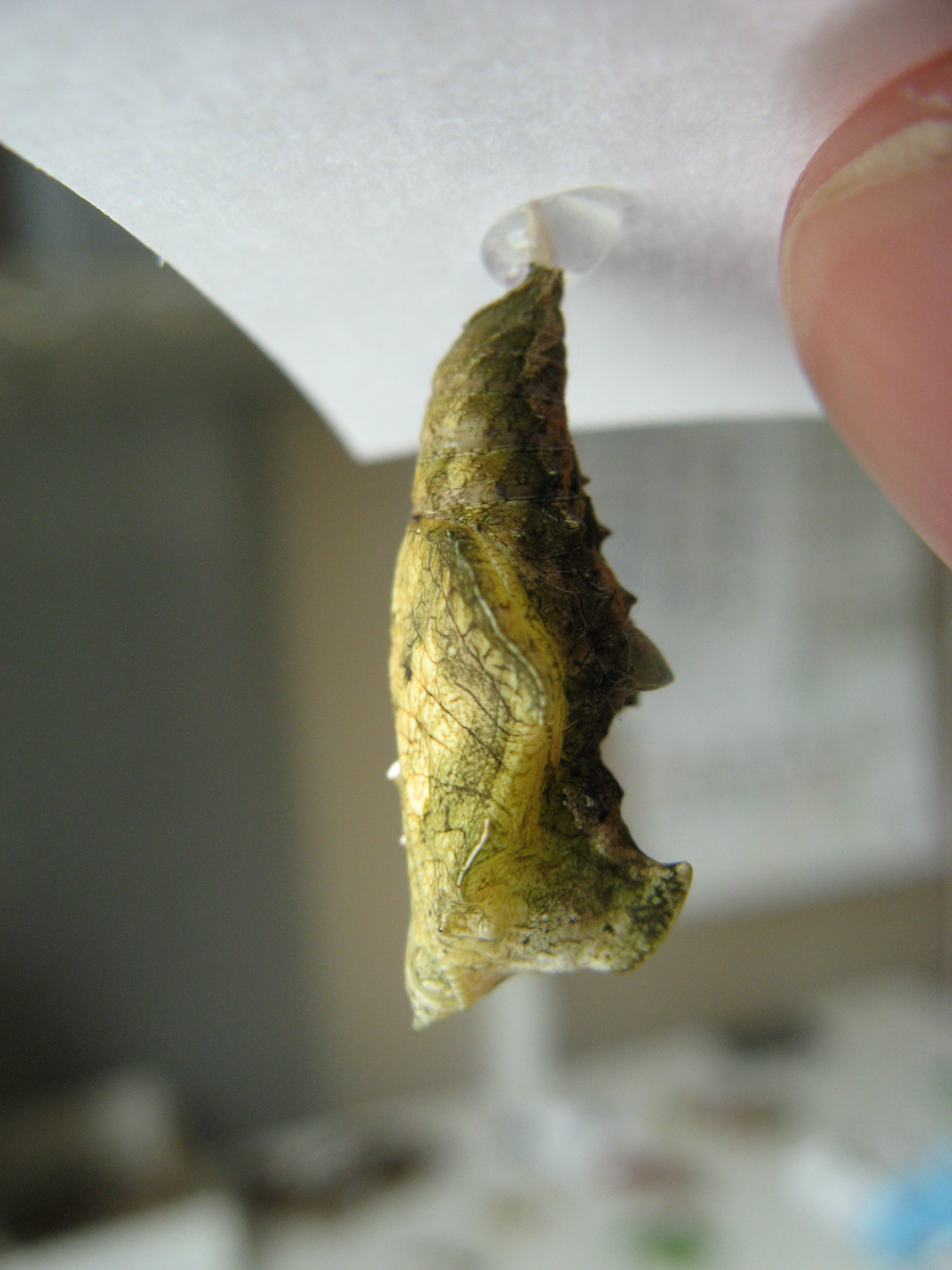
Lateral view of pupa

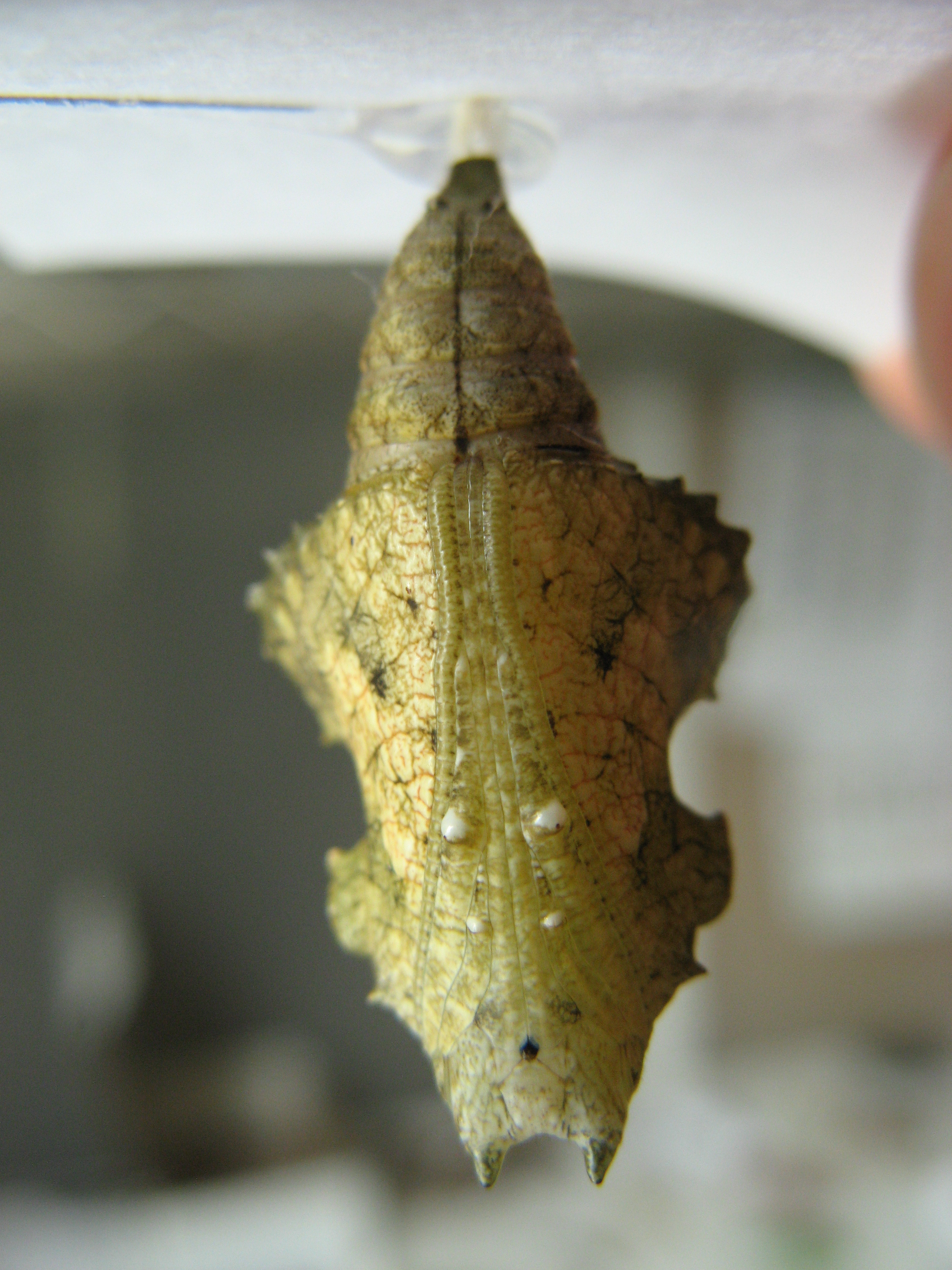
Dorsal view of pupa

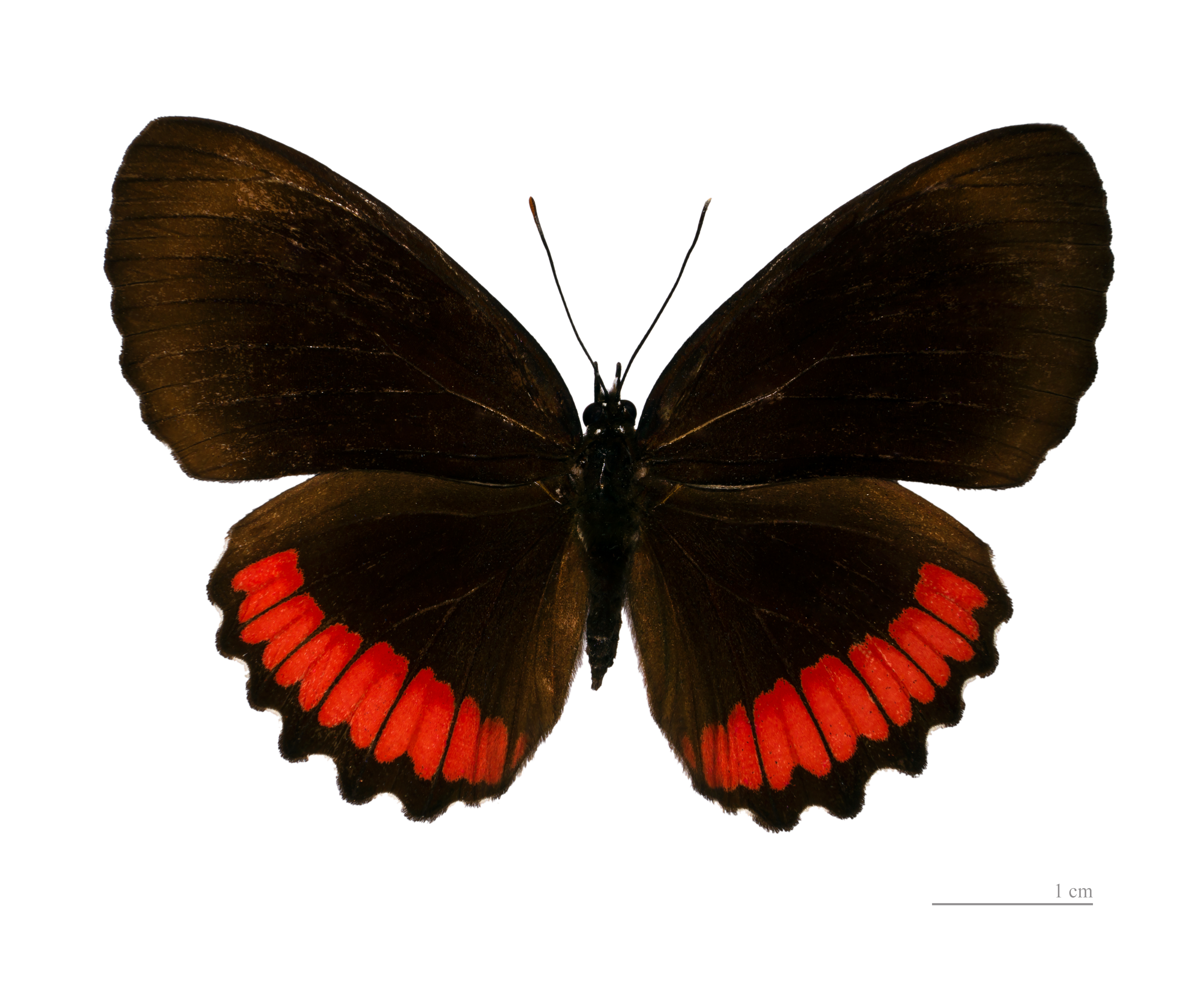
Dorsal view - MHNT

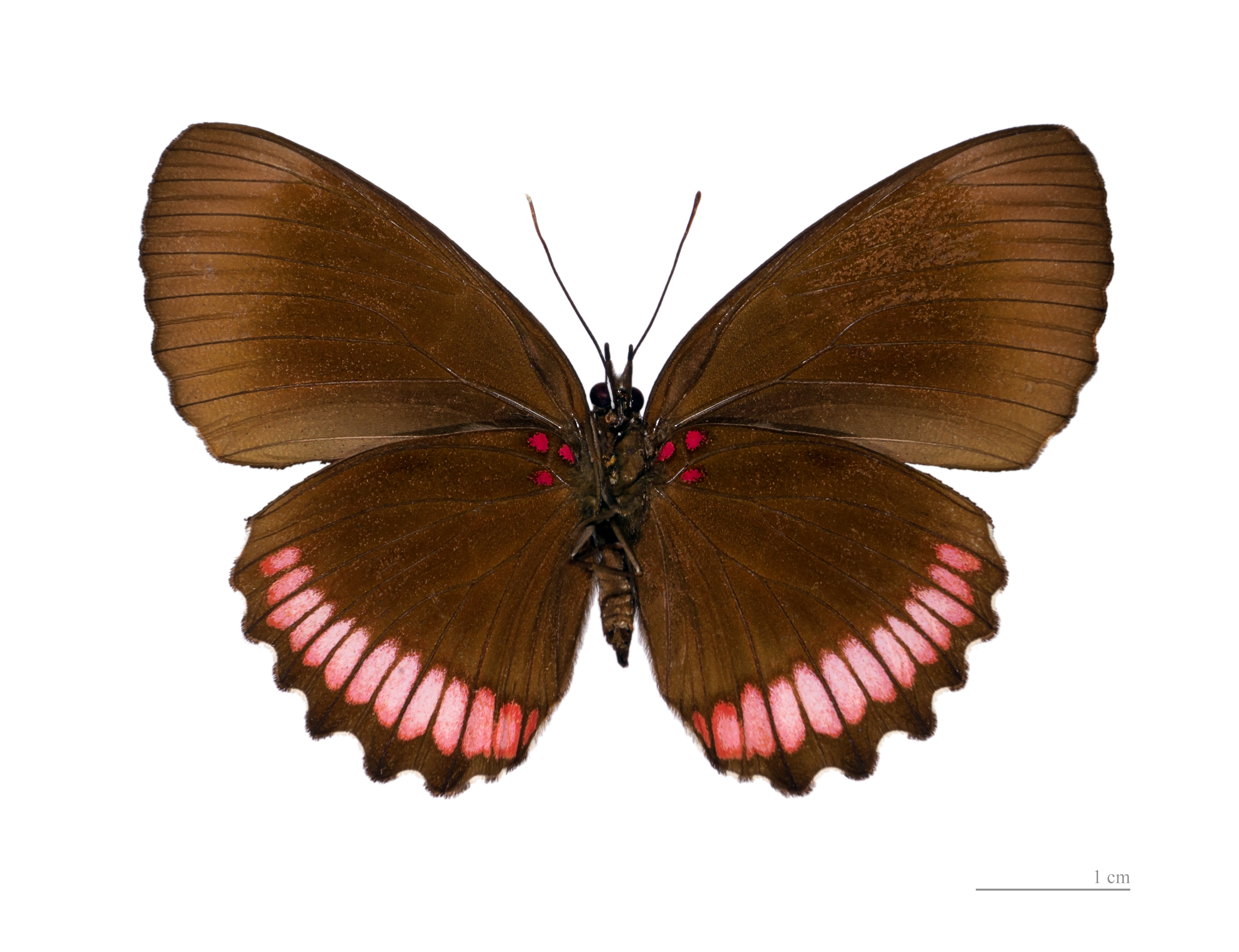
Ventral view - MHNT
