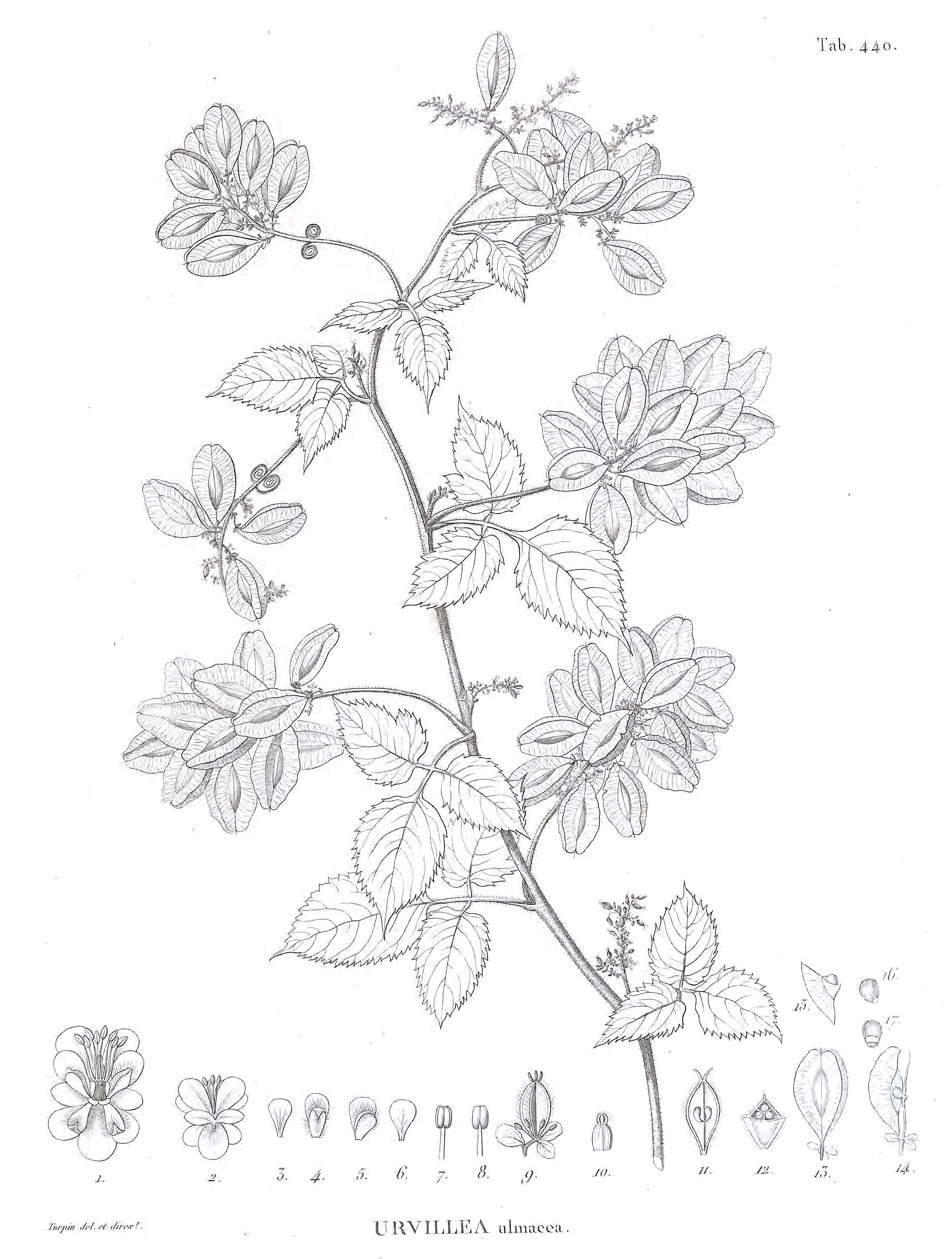
- Urvillea ulmacea

Scientific classification
- Kingdom: Plantae
- Clade: Tracheophytes
- Clade: Angiosperms
- Clade: Eudicots
- Clade: Rosids
- Order: Sapindales
- Family: Sapindaceae
- Subfamily: Sapindoideae
- Genus: Urvillea; Kunth (1821)

Species
- 20; see text

= Urvillea =

Genus of flowering plants

Urvillea is a genus of flowering plants in the family Sapindaceae. It includes 20 species native to the tropical and subtropical Americas, ranging from Texas to northern Argentina.

== Species ==
20 species are accepted.

- Urvillea andersonii Ferrucci
- Urvillea chacoensis Hunz.
- Urvillea cuchujaquensis (Ferrucci & Acev.-Rodr.) Acev.-Rodr. & Ferrucci
- Urvillea dasycarpa Radlk.
- Urvillea filipes Radlk.
- Urvillea glabra Cambess.
- Urvillea intermedia Radlk.
- Urvillea laevis Radlk.
- Urvillea oliveirae (Ferrucci) Acev.-Rodr. & Ferrucci
- Urvillea paucidentata Ferrucci
- Urvillea peruviana Ferrucci
- Urvillea procumbens (Radlk.) Acev.-Rodr. & Ferrucci
- Urvillea pterocarpa (Radlk.) Acev.-Rodr. & Ferrucci
- Urvillea rufescens Cambess.
- Urvillea stipitata Radlk.
- Urvillea stipularis Ferrucci
- Urvillea triphylla (Vell.) Radlk.
- Urvillea ulmacea Kunth
- Urvillea uniloba Radlk.
- Urvillea venezuelensis Ferrucci
