= Ramopia =

Scientific classification
- Domain: Eukaryota
- Kingdom: Animalia
- Phylum: Arthropoda
- Class: Insecta
- Order: Lepidoptera
- Superfamily: Noctuoidea
- Family: Erebidae
- Subfamily: Herminiinae
- Genus: Ramopia; Nye, 1975

Synonyms
- Paromia Schaus, 1913

Genus of moths

Ramopia /rəˈmoʊpiə/ is a genus of moths of the family Erebidae. The genus was described by Nye in 1975.

The Global Lepidoptera Names Index gives this name as a synonym of Rejectaria Guenée, 1854.

== Species ==
- Ramopia nigripunctata (Schaus, 1913) Costa Rica
- Ramopia rufifusalis (Hampson, 1924) Trinidad
