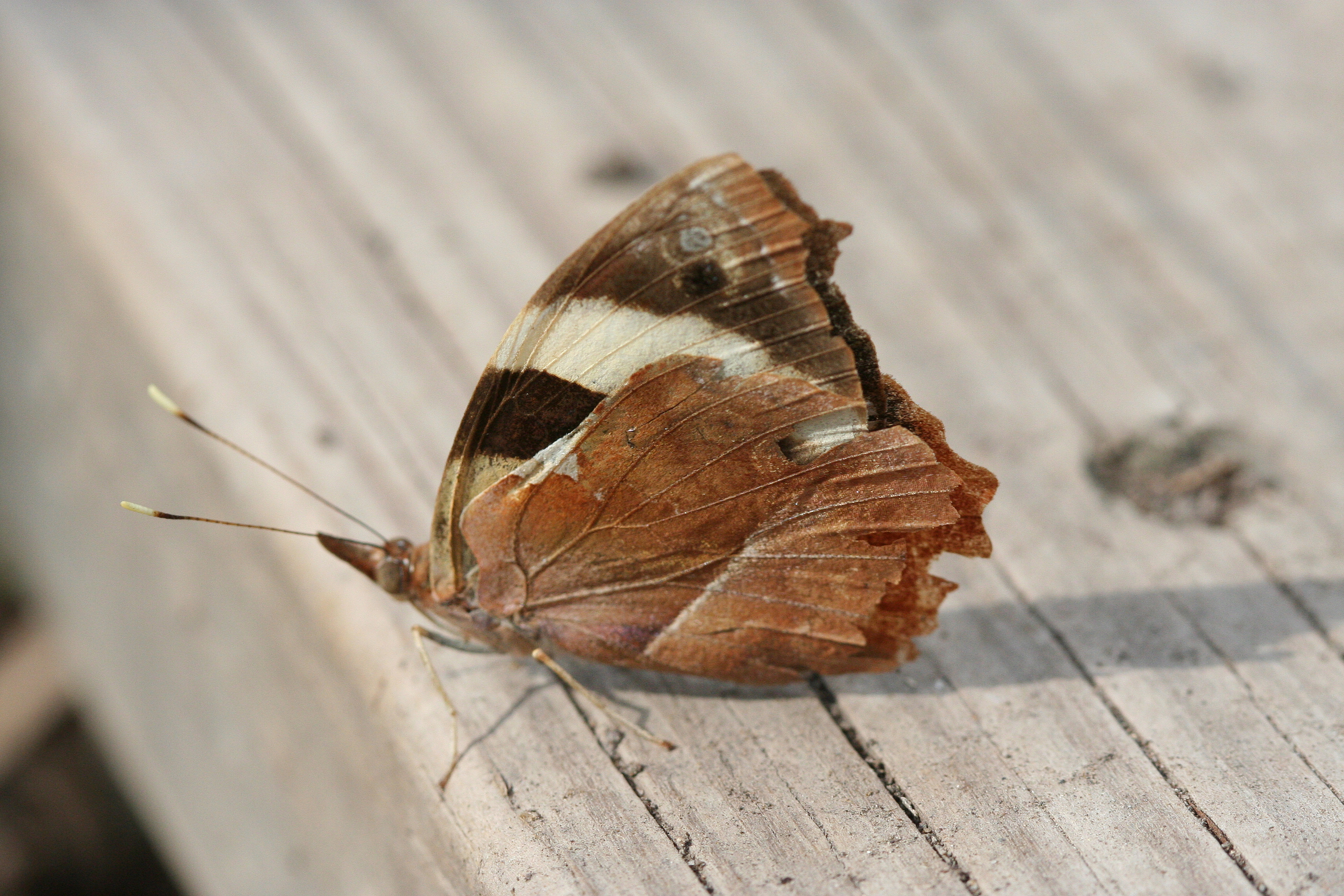
- Epiphile adrasta

Scientific classification
- Domain: Eukaryota
- Kingdom: Animalia
- Phylum: Arthropoda
- Class: Insecta
- Order: Lepidoptera
- Family: Nymphalidae
- Subfamily: Biblidinae
- Tribe: Callicorini
- Genus: Epiphile; E. Doubleday, 1845

= Epiphile =

Genus of brush-footed butterflies

Epiphile is a genus of banners in the butterfly family Nymphalidae. There are about 19 described species in Epiphile.

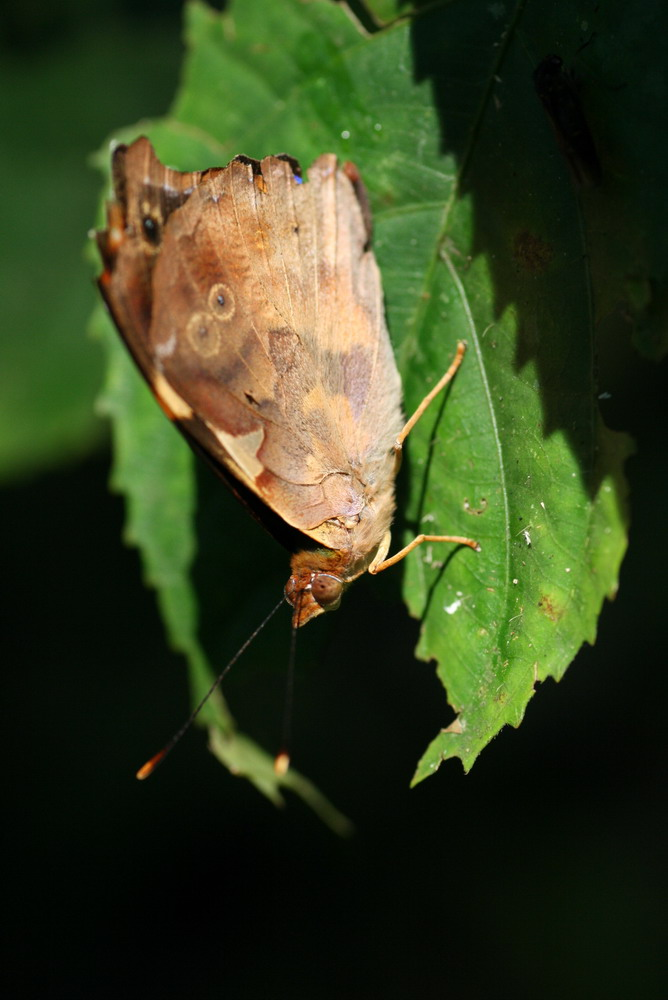
Epiphile orea

== Species ==
These 19 species belong to the genus Epiphile:

- Epiphile adrasta Hewitson, 1861 (common banner)
- Epiphile chrysites Latreille, 1823
- Epiphile dilecta Röber, 1913
- Epiphile dinora Fassl, 1912
- Epiphile electra Staudinger, 1886
- Epiphile epicaste Hewitson, 1857
- Epiphile epimenes Hewitson, 1857
- Epiphile eriopis Hewitson, 1857
- Epiphile fassli Röber, 1913
- Epiphile grandis Butler, 1872
- Epiphile hermosa De La Maza & Díaz Francés, 1978
- Epiphile hubneri Hewitson, 1861
- Epiphile kalbreyeri Fassl, 1912
- Epiphile lampethusa Doubleday, 1848
- Epiphile negrina Felder, 1862
- Epiphile orea Hübner, 1816/24
- Epiphile plusios Godman & Salvin, 1883
- Epiphile plutonia Bates, 1864
- Epiphile zipa Mengel, 1899
