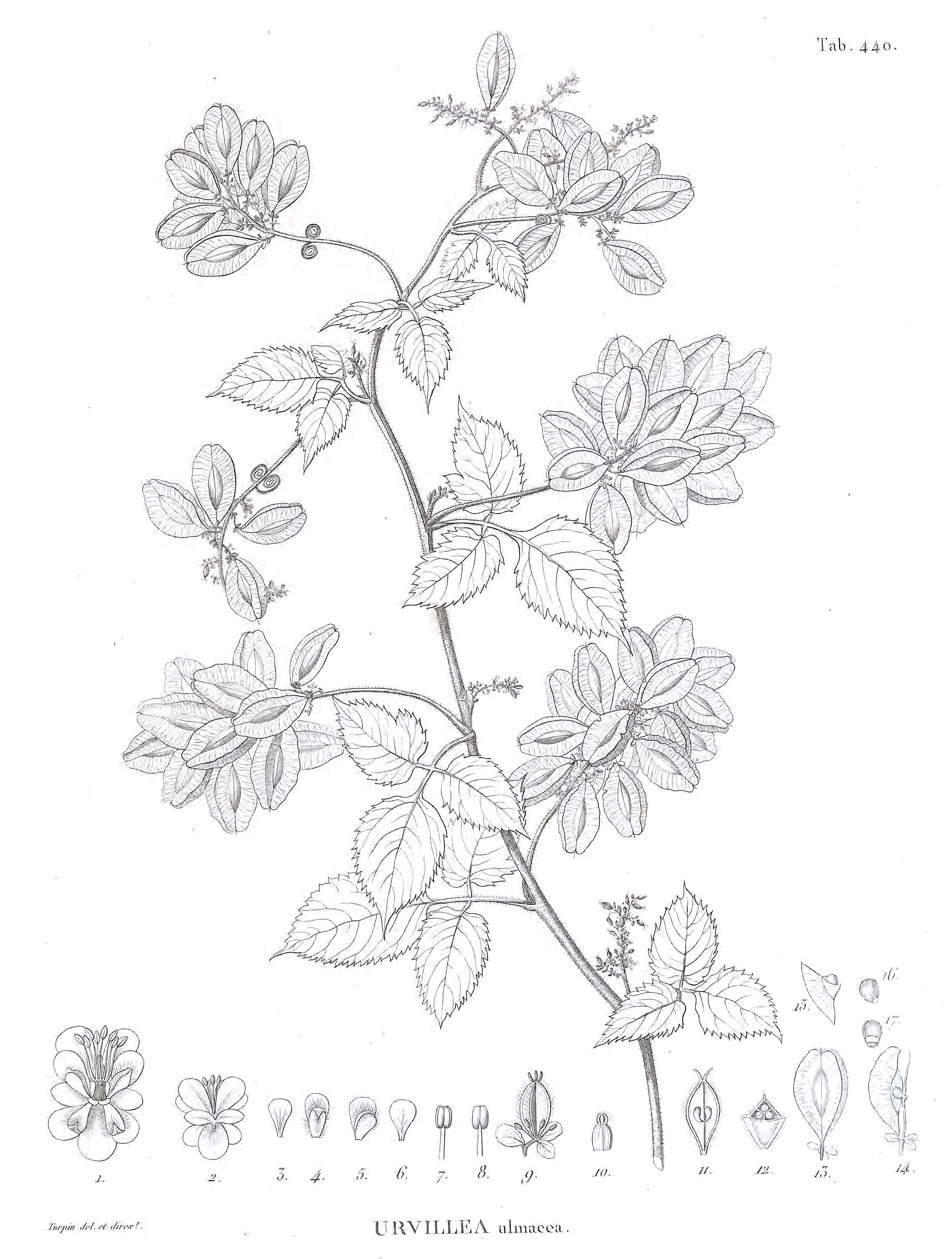

Scientific classification
- Kingdom: Plantae
- Clade: Tracheophytes
- Clade: Angiosperms
- Clade: Eudicots
- Clade: Rosids
- Order: Sapindales
- Family: Sapindaceae
- Genus: Urvillea
- Species: U. ulmacea

Binomial name
- Urvillea ulmacea Kunth in H.B.K. (Humboldt, Bonpland & Kunth)

Synonyms
- Serjania lanceolata Cambess. Urvillea berteroana DC. Urvillea seriana Griseb. Urvillea ulmacea f. berteriana (DC.) Radlk. Urvillea ulmacea var. berteroana (DC.) F.A.Barkley; Urvillea ulmacea var. beteriana (DC.) F.A. Barkley

= Urvillea ulmacea =

Species of flowering plant

Urvillea ulmacea is a plant species in the genus Urvillea found in French Guiana and in the Caatinga region of Brazil.
