= Wave (disambiguation) =

A wave is a disturbance that transfers energy through matter or space.

Wave or waves may also refer to:

== Arts, entertainment and media ==
=== Fictional characters ===
- Wave (Marvel Comics), a character in the Marvel Universe
- Wave the Swallow, a character in the Sonic the Hedgehog franchise
- Wave, a character in Agame ga Kill!

=== Literature and writing ===
- Wave (magazine), an English-language, monthly magazine in Nepal
- Wave (Deraniyagala book), a 2013 memoir by Sonali Deraniyagala
- Wave Books, an American publisher

=== Music ===
- The wave (music), a movement of post-hardcore
- Wave music, an electronic bass music genre

==== People ====
- Rod Wave, American singer and rapper

==== Bands ====
- Wave (band), a Canadian pop band
- Waves (band), a New Zealand folk rock band
- Wavves, an American rock band

==== Albums ====
- Wave (Antonio Carlos Jobim album), 1967
- Wave (Patti Smith Group album), 1979
- Wave (T-Square album), 1989
- Wave (Murray Head album), 1992
- Wave (CNBLUE album), 2014
- Wave (Patrick Watson album), 2019
- Wave (Ive EP), 2023
- Wave (WEi EP), 2024

==== Songs ====
- "Wave" (Antonio Carlos Jobim song), 1967
- "Wave" (Asake and Central Cee song), 2024
- "Wave" (Beck song), 2014
- "Wave" (Meghan Trainor song), 2019
- "Wave", a 2018 song by Justin Timberlake from Man of the Woods
- "Wave", a song by Ateez from the album Treasure EP.3: One to All

=== Radio and television stations ===
- DWAV, an FM radio station in Metro Manila, Philippines formerly known as Wave 89.1 (2001–2024)
- WAVE (TV), an American television station
- Wave FM, a former radio station in Dundee
- WAVE Radio, a radio station in Belize City
- WGTK (AM), a radio station in Louisville, Kentucky formerly operated as WAVE
- CHKX-FM, Canadian radio station known as Wave 947
- Wave, a pair of television idents for BBC Two; see BBC Two '1991–2001' idents

== Businesses and organizations ==
- Wave (financial services and software), a Canadian company
- Wave Broadband, an American service provider
- WAVE Trust, Worldwide Alternatives to Violence, a charity
- WAVES, Women Accepted for Volunteer Emergency Service, a former branch of the U.S. Navy
- Waves Audio, an Israeli company
- Women Against Violence Europe

== Politics ==
- Landslide victory, in electoral politics
  - Wave elections in the United States
- Conservative wave, a political phenomenon in the mid-2010s to early 2020s in Latin America

== Sport ==
- Milwaukee Wave, an American soccer team
- Pepperdine Waves, the athletic program of Pepperdine University, U.S.
- Wilmington Waves, an American baseball team

== Technology ==
- WAV, Waveform Audio File Format, also known as WAVE
- Wave (smart speaker), by Naver Corporation and Line Corporation
- WAVE, Wireless Access in Vehicular Environments, alias for IEEE 802.11p wireless standard
- Apache Wave, formerly Google Wave, a software framework
- Wave, a 2014 iOS 8 hoax feature
- PV-Wave, a programming language
- WebAIM WAVE, an accessibility evaluation tool
- Samsung Wave, a smartphone developed and produced by Samsung Electronics
- Samsung Wave II, a smartphone developed and produced by Samsung Electronics

== Vehicles ==
- Wave (brig), a sailing vessel wrecked in 1848
- Wave (HBC vessel), operated by the Hudson's Bay Company from 1840–1841; see Hudson's Bay Company vessels
- USS Wave, the name of several United States Navy ships
- Airwave Wave, an Austrian paraglider design
- Bajaj Wave, a motor scooter
- Honda Wave series, motorcycles
- Pontiac Wave, a car

== Other uses ==
- Wind wave or swell, surface wave on waterbodies generated by wind and gravity equilibrium
- Wave (audience), or Mexican wave, when successive spectators raise their arms
- Wave (gesture), involving moving one's hand
- Wave (typeface)
- Waves (hairstyle), a hairstyle for curly hair

== See also ==
- Wav (disambiguation)
- Waves (disambiguation)
- The Wave (disambiguation)
- Blue Wave (disambiguation)
- Great Wave (disambiguation)
- Wave model (disambiguation)
- Wave, Wave, a South Korean soap opera
