= Waves (disambiguation) =

Waves are disturbances that transfer energy from matter or space.

Waves may also refer to:

== Music ==
- Waves (band)

=== Albums and EPs ===
- Waves (Charles Lloyd album)
- Waves (Jade Warrior album)
- Waves (Katrina and the Waves album)
- Waves (Moving Mountains album)
- Waves (Rachel Platten album)
- Waves (Rhydian Roberts album)
- Waves (Sam Rivers album)
- Waves (Story Untold album)
- Waves (Terje Rypdal album)
- Waves (Waves album)
- Waves: Radio 1 Sessions 90–94, a compilation album by Ride
- Waves (Mick Jenkins EP)
- Waves (Azure Ray EP)
- Waves, one of the original titles for the Kanye West album, The Life of Pablo
- Waves, a 2005 album by Eric Andersen

=== Songs ===
- "Waves" (Blancmange song), 1983
- "Waves" (Dean Lewis song), 2016
- "Waves" (Kanye West song), 2016
- "Waves" (Luke Bryan song), 2021
- "Waves" (Mono Band song), 2005
- "Waves" (Mr. Probz song), 2013
- "Waves" (Normani song), 2018
- "Waves" (Miguel song), 2015
- "Waves", by Big Time Rush from the album Another Life, 2023
- "Waves", by Bon Jovi from the album Forever, 2024
- "Waves", by Camille from the album Music Hole, 2008
- "Waves", by Chloe Moriondo, 2018
- "Waves", by Guided by Voices from the album Let's Go Eat the Factory, 2012
- "Waves", by Holly Miranda from the album The Magician's Private Library, 2010
- "Waves", by Hooverphonic from the album The Magnificent Tree, 2000
- "Waves", by Imagine Dragons from the album Mercury – Acts 1 & 2, 2022
- "Waves", by Joey Badass from the mixtape 1999, 2012
- "Waves", by Kris Allen from the album Letting You In, 2016
- "Waves", by Phish from the album Round Room, 2002
- "Waves", by Royal Blood from the album Back to the Water Below, 2023
- "Waves", by Simone Bocchino, 2004
- "Waves", by Slowdive from the album Just for a Day, 1991
- "Waves", by Snoop Dogg and October London from the EP 220, 2018
- "Waves", by Underground Lovers from the album Leaves Me Blind, 1992
- "The Waves", by Bastille from Doom Days

== Other uses ==
- WAVES, the Women Accepted for Volunteer Emergency Service (United States Navy)
- Waves (airline)
- Waves (festival)
- Waves (hairstyle)
- Waves (Juno), an experiment aboard the Juno spacecraft
- WAVES (New Zealand), a New Zealand anti-vaccination group
- WAVES (summit), World Audio Visual & Entertainment Summit in India
- Waves (2019 film), a drama film
- Waves (2024 film), a Czech thriller film
- Waves, North Carolina
- The Waves, 1931 Virginia Woolf novel
- Pokémon Winds and Waves, a pair of upcoming 2027 video games

== See also ==
- WAVS 1170 AM, Davie, Florida, USA
- Waves Radio 101.2 FM, Peterhead, Scotland, UK
- Waves Audio
- Waves '98
- Wavves, an American rock band
  - Wavves (album), 2008 Wavves album
  - Wavvves, 2009 Wavves album
- Michael Wavves
- Wave (disambiguation)
