= Blue Wave =

Blue Wave or Bluewave may refer to:

== Politics ==
- Wave elections in the United States — a blue wave refers to significant gains for the Democratic Party during elections such as:
  - 2006 United States elections
  - 2008 United States elections
  - 2018 United States elections
  - 2026 United States elections
- Conservative wave, also called blue tide, the success of right-wing presidential candidates in South America

== Sports ==
- Orix BlueWave, a former Nippon Professional Baseball team, Japan
- Chonburi Bluewave Futsal Club, a Thai Futsal League team
- Blue Wave, a nickname for the Al Hilal Club, Sudan
- Blue Wave, a nickname for the teams of Darien High School, U.S.
- Blue Wave, a nickname for Florida Atlantic Owls baseball, U.S.
- Blue Wave, a nickname for South Korea national baseball team
- Blue Wave, a nickname for the Surfers Paradise Baseball Club, Australia
- Blue Wave, a nickname for the teams of Westsyde Secondary School, Canada

== Other uses ==
- Blue Wave-Marikina, mall and office complex in Marikina, Metro Manila, Philippines
- Myscelia cyaniris or blue wave, a species of butterfly
- Blue Wave updates, a series of firmware updates for the Samsung P2

== Music ==
- Blue Wave, a 1998 album by THC
- "Blue Wave", a 1984 song by Eddy Grant from Going for Broke
- "Blue Wave", a 2007 song by West Indian Girl from 4th & Wall
- Blue Wave, the marching band of Gordon Central High School in Georgia, U.S.

== See also ==
- Great Wave (disambiguation)
- Wave (disambiguation)
- The Wave (disambiguation)
- The Great Wave off Kanagawa
