= WXM Powerbomb =

2025 wrestling event in Mumbai, India

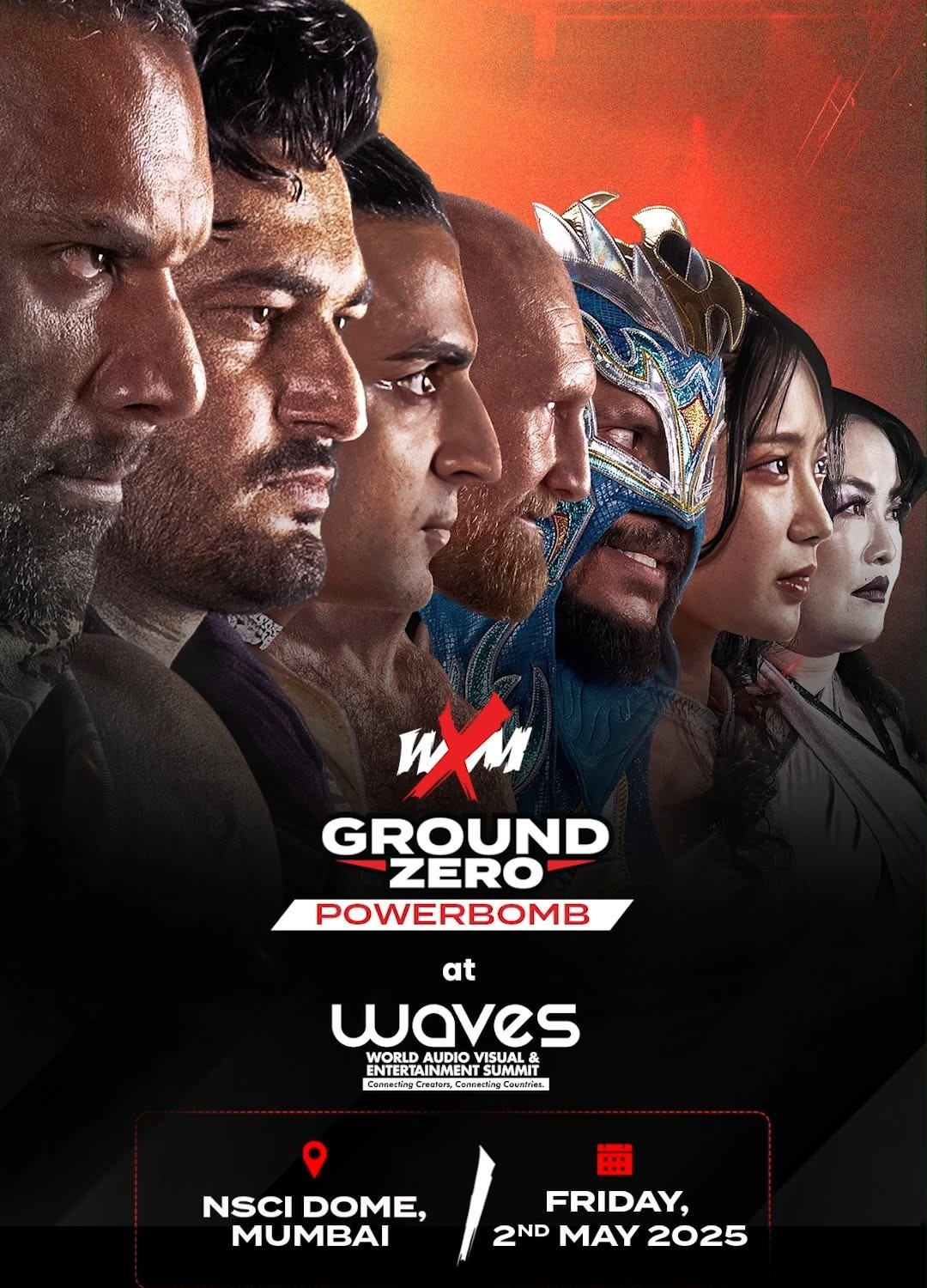
- WXM Powerbomb 2025 poster
- Promotion: Wrestling Xtreme Mania
- Date: May 2, 2025 (aired September 27 - December 6, 2025)
- City: Mumbai, Maharashtra, India
- Venue: NSCI Dome
- Tagline: The Introduction

Event chronology
← Previous; First	Next → WXM BreakPoint

WXM Powerbomb is the first professional wrestling supercard event produced by Wrestling Xtreme Mania (WXM). It was initially marketed as WXM Ground Zero Powerbomb before being shortened to WXM Powerbomb. Established in 2025, it was held on May 2, 2025, on the sidelines of WAVES 2025 at the NSCI Dome in Mumbai, Maharashtra, India.

Seven professional wrestling matches were taped at the event with Raj the Maharaja defeating Sha Samuels in the main event.

== Event ==
=== Preliminary Matches ===
The opening match took place between Adam Maxted and Kevin Malik. Venomous was shown observing Malik from the audience during the bout. Malik hits Maxted with his signature Last Gear for the win.

Next, Raj the Maharaja comes to address the audience but was interrupted by Sha Samuels and challenges for a fight in the main event.

Other on-screen personnel
Role:	Name:
Commentators	Andrew Karr
Commentators	Jonny Loquasto
Ring announcer	Jarrod Kyle Pereira
Referee	Tom Scarborough

Next, Kaptaan and Samuray Del Sol took on Cima and JD Lee in a tag team match. Kaptaan delivers a back elbow drop to JD Lee for the win.

Next match was a Fatal 4 Way match for the inaugural WAVES Shield contested by Charles Sterling, Guru, Axel Tischer and Sheikh El Sham. Guru crossbodies Sterling and Tischer and then a springboard cutter to Sheikh El Sham to win the WAVES Shield. In a backstage segment following the match, Axel Tischer attacked Guru and subsequently signed his official contract with WXM.

In fourth match we saw Jossan dominates the match against Regner with his brute strength and intimidating presence. Despite Regner's agility and fighting spirit, Jossan ultimately wins with a powerbomb.

Next, Chris Adonis appeared to host his signature Masterlock Challenge, issuing an open challenge to audience. Sid an IT-guy from crowd accepts the challenge but he could not survive long and tapped out quickly. Then Neil steps up, surprising Adonis with his physique and confidence. Adonis, attempts a cowardly attack from behind and tries to leave the ring. This leads to General Manager Mark Dallas intervening and unexpectedly turning the Masterlock Challenge into an official match between Chris Adonis and Neil. Neil ultimately defeats Adonis with a spear.

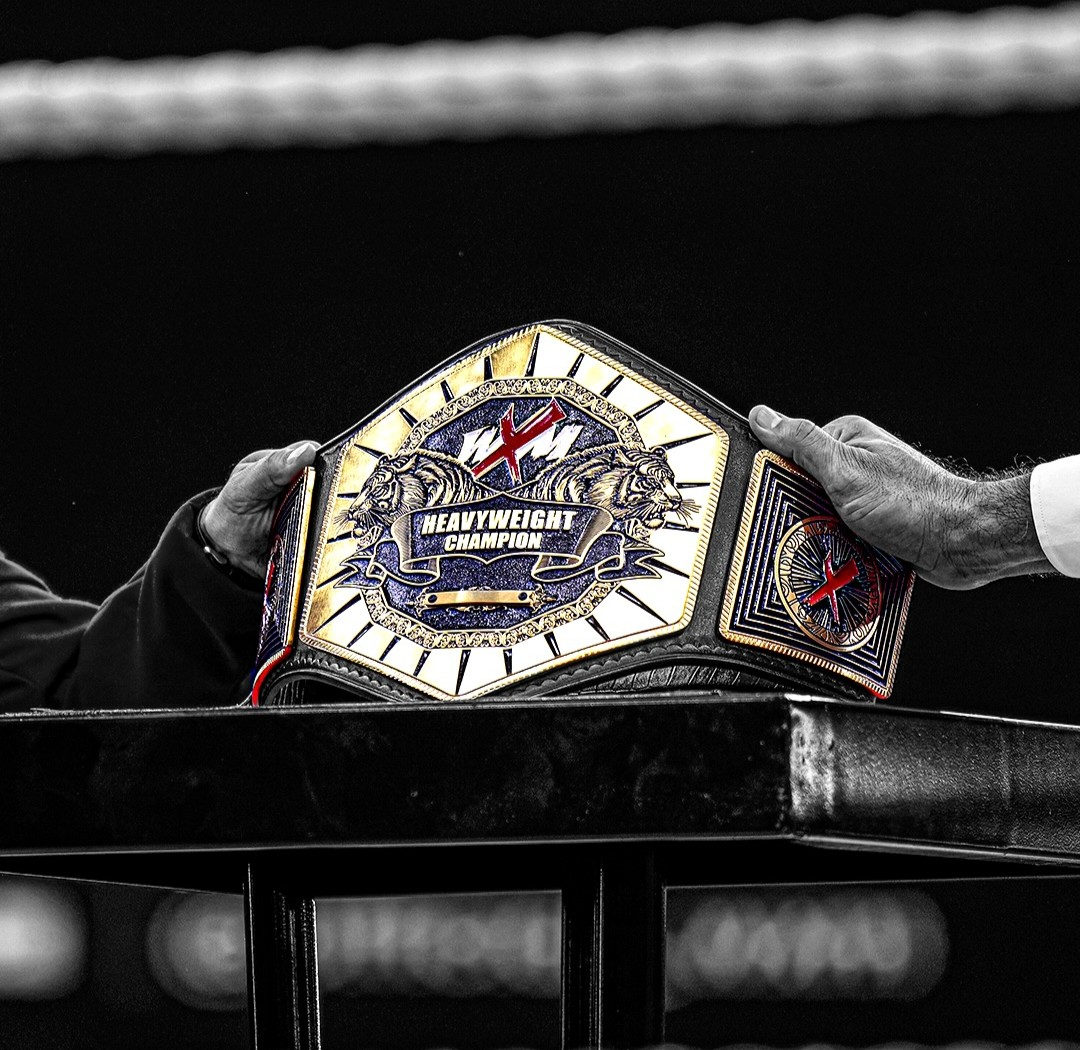
WXM World Heavyweight title

Penultimate match featured Best Bros (Baliyan Akki and Mei Suruga) and Dev and Emi Sakura in a mixed tag team match. The match concludes with the Best Bros securing the victory over Dev and Emi Sakura, utilizing their signature Dolphin Press on Dev.

Following the match, special guest commissioner Mark Dalas introduces the CEO and COO of WXM, Rishi Singh and Jeet Rama. They unveil the WXM World Heavyweight Championship belt

=== Main event ===
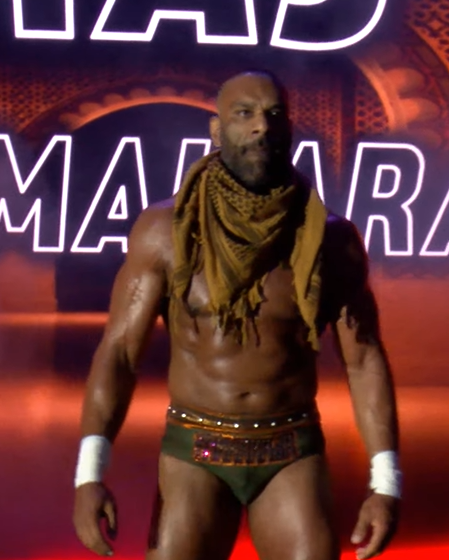
Raj the Maharaja at the WXM Powerbomb Main Event

Samuels attempts to intimidate Raj with a sneak attack and psychological tactics before the main event. Despite Samuels' aggressive tactics, Raj remains focused and powerful. The match immediately spills outside the ring, with Raj delivering a powerful right hand that takes down Samuels. Raj continues to dominate in the early stages, imposing his will on his opponent.

Raj maintains control, feeding off the crowd's energy. Samuels uses the referee as a human shield to gain an advantage, leading to a suplex that shifts the momentum in his favor. Samuels then employs a "slow, methodical" approach, inflicting suffering on Raj, but Raj manages to kick out of a pinfall attempt.

Samuels pulls out the steel chair but Raj manages to escape and delivers his signature Khalas and seals the win.

Shortly after the victory, Raj was attacked by Jossan with a German suplex, and then Kaptaan arrived to rescue him. More wrestlers arrived and chaos broke out. Finally, Jeet intervened to end the chaos. Then, Raj was approached by Rishi to sign the WXM contract, which he did.

== Aftermath ==
On WXM Ground Zero #1, Rishi and Jeet came out to make a major announcement regarding the WXM World Heavyweight Title. Raj the Maharaja was scheduled to be the special guest, but before he could arrive, Jossan entered the ring alongside Crossbones and attempted to stake his claim to the title. His interruption was soon cut short when Raj arrived and confronted him. Then on Ground Zero #2, Raj came out to address and interact with the audience, but his segment was abruptly interrupted by Jossan. In the main event of Ground Zero #5, Raj defeated Jossan in the first round of the WXM World Heavyweight Title tournament.

== Results ==
No.	Results	Stipulations	Times
1	Kevin Malik defeated Adam Maxted by pinfall	Singles match	13:40
2	Kaptaan and Samuray Del Sol defeated Cima and JD Lee by pinfall	Tag team match	15:06
3	Guru defeated Axel Tischer, Charles Sterling, and Sheikh El-Sham by pinfall	Fatal 4 Way for inaugural WAVES Shield	10:27
4	Jossan defeated Regner by pinfall	Singles match	6:10
5	Neel defeated Chris Adonis by pinfall	Singles match	4:50
6	Best Bros (Baliyan Akki and Mei Suruga) defeated Emi Sakura and Dev by pinfall	Mixed tag team match	9:55
7	Raj the Maharaja defeated Sha Samuels by pinfall	Singles match	11:13
