= Champlain's Dream =

Book by David Hackett Fischer

- First edition
- Author: David Hackett Fischer
- Cover artist: Johannes Vermeer, The Geographer - 1668/69
- Language: English
- Genre: History
- Publisher: Simon & Schuster
- Publication date: 14 October 2008
- Publication place: United States
- Media type: Print (hardback & paperback)
- Pages: 834 p. (hardback edition)
- ISBN: 9781416593324 (hardback edition)
- OCLC: 780062304

Champlain's Dream: The European Founding of North America is a biography written by American historian David Hackett Fischer and published in 2008. It chronicles the life of French soldier, spy, master mariner, explorer, cartographer, artist, and "Father of New France," Samuel de Champlain.

In this book, Fischer examines Champlain's personal impact on the establishment of a French colony in the New World—securing royal support despite opposition from formidable foes like Marie de' Medici and Cardinal Richelieu, negotiating with "Indian nations," and imbuing the new colony with humanist values. He is also remembered for surviving 27 crossings of the North Atlantic in 37 years without ever losing a ship. Despite never being the "senior official" of New France, Champlain functioned as an absolute ruler. As Fischer shows, Champlain's vision for New France—a vision shaped by his upbringing and experiences—helps explain both its triumphs and failures.

Fischer has substantial experience using the life and perspective of a great leader to tell a broader historical narrative. He employed a similar structure in Washington's Crossing, for which he received the Pulitzer Prize in 2005.

== Main thesis ==
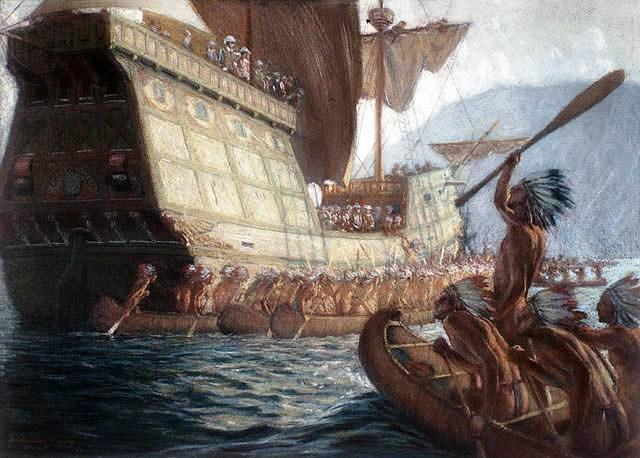
Samuel de Champlain arrive à Québec - George Agnew Reid, 1909

Champlain's dreams as an explorer and cartographer are documented in his own writings. One of his goals was to find a North American passage to China. Ostensibly, his overarching dream was to establish a successful French colony in the New World, which required him to secure political support in the French court.

Between 1535 and 1601, six French settlements in the New World ended in failure. Champlain carefully studied the experiences of earlier explorers like Jacques Cartier and Pierre de Chauvin. He also needed to convince figures such as the duc de Sully, the King's Chief Minister, who believed American colonies were contrary to French national interests as they distracted from domestic affairs. Other noblemen of the time preferred domestic reforms over expansion abroad, and Champlain remained alert to their machinations. Additionally, he had to make difficult administrative decisions once in the New World.

Even after royal support was secured, "rival merchants, competing seaports, and representatives of foreign powers" conspired against the colonies of New France. It fell to Champlain to lead his men in dealing with a range of problems. The explorers had to claim land, protect it from "Indian nations," and convince French subjects to emigrate to the New World—a prospect they were far less enthusiastic about than the British fleeing religious persecution. Even after the colonies began to run smoothly, Champlain had to regulate unlicensed trade on the rivers and build trading posts to ensure the colony remained profitable.

But as Fischer presents in this book, Champlain's dream went further than that. He envisioned the colony as "a place where people of different cultures could live together in amity and concord" and hoped that North America could become this place. He dreamed of collective action, humanistic ideals like peace and tolerance, and a Francophone legacy in the New World. Fischer frequently references Champlain's "grand design" or his sweeping vision.

What Fischer seeks to do in this book, after articulating Champlain's aspiration, is to ask a series of questions about why Champlain believed in it and what steps he took to make it a reality.

== Fischer's treatment of Champlain ==
Fischer rejects the view that Champlain was merely another European mercenary seeking to seize lands and enslave native populations, as many early British and Spanish explorers in North America did. He writes admiringly of Champlain's humanist values, noting that Champlain treated "Indian nations" with respect and pursued peaceful coexistence through policies of "trade alliances, cultural tolerance, and intermarriage."

=== An explanation for Champlain's humanism ===
Growing up in port city of Brouage

Fischer describes the unique character of Brouage, the town of Champlain's youth, as the "salty broth in which our hero was cooked." Due to its thriving economy and "cosmopolitan nature," Champlain's father managed to rise from a humble ship's pilot to a naval captain in the King's Marine. Thus, Champlain's early life was one of visible opportunity and upward mobility, an experience that Fischer claims contributed to Champlain's later optimism and persistence.

Brouage was in a region deeply suspicious of Paris, the seat of power, but it enjoyed a "broad diversity of language, culture, religion, and ecology." This upbringing instilled in Champlain an exceptional curiosity about cultural differences. He learned Dutch, English, and Spanish both in school and from his neighbors, and he acquired "the art of navigation" from his father. Despite lacking a 'classical' education, Samuel de Champlain became skilled in the use of weapons and likely learned map-making from a family friend who was an "engineer and geographer to the King." Fischer emphasizes the exposure Champlain had as a youth and the diverse strengths he gained through his family, education, and town, showing how each contributed to his later adventures.

The religious turbulence of his youth

Even the small town of Brouage was not immune to the clashes between Calvinists and Roman Catholics that occurred after the Protestant Reformation. Fischer recounts an incident in which a rival port city sent "barges full of sand and rock" to block the channel leading to Brouage and sabotage its trade. After 1628, Brouage was turned into a garrison by Cardinal Richelieu, its sea trade having been cut off. Although historians cannot confirm whether Champlain was Protestant or Catholic, his writings reveal the influence of a deep "Christian faith." Fischer further draws parallels between King Henry IV of France and Champlain, arguing that both men detested intolerance, viewing it as "anti-Christian." He claims that both believed religion was a force for social and political stability, that faith was an intensely personal choice, and that religious controversy mattered far less than "piety, humility, and good works."

Fischer claims that Champlain understood the need for cultural acceptance while also limiting violence to ensure stability and prevent war.

=== That Champlain may have been the illegitimate son of the king ===
One of the new theories presented in this book is that Champlain was actually the son of French King Henry IV. Historians such as Marcel Trudel and Hubert Deschamps had previously suggested that Champlain was the son of an "unknown French nobleman." However, Fischer argues that Champlain's "close relationship with the King" and "the King's travel history in the nine months prior to Champlain's birth" lead him to believe that Henry IV was indeed the father. At a book reception at Brandeis, Fischer stated, “He was at the right place at the right time, so to speak. It could have happened. Granted that there is exactly zero hard evidence to support that theory, but [if Henry IV were his father] it would explain many anomalies in their relationship. It's only a possibility, but it's very clear that the two of them had a very special relationship.”

== The challenges of writing biography on Samuel de Champlain ==
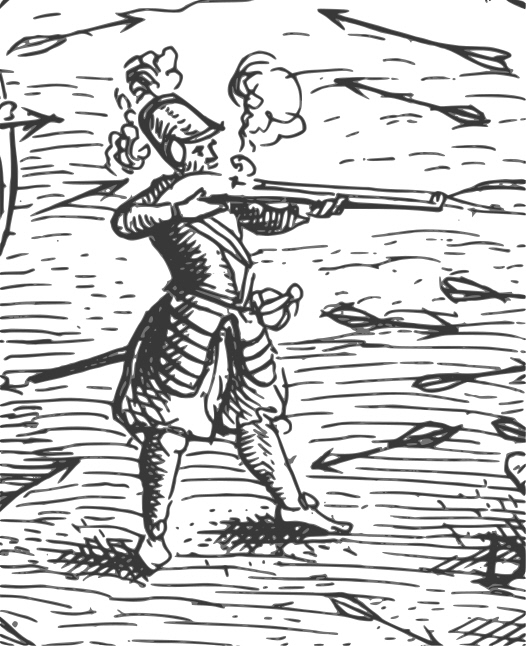
The defeat of the Iroquois at Lake Champlain

Many reviewers of Fischer's work have noted that little is known about Samuel de Champlain, both in the United States and in Canada. Despite his various achievements, he remains a somewhat obscure figure.

Only a single "authentic likeness . . . is known to survive from his own time." This likeness is a one-inch engraving showing him wielding an advanced wheel-lock arquebus and adorned with a panache, or feathery plume, in his helmet. All other portraits or images of him date from much later.

Another issue is that he wrote "thousands of pages about what he did, but only a few words about who he was." Historians hardly know his birthdate, level of schooling, or even whether he was baptized as a Protestant or a Catholic.

Fischer has also suggested that Champlain may have been forgotten due to the predominance of the Annales school of French historiography. Under its influence, the "structure of society and the details of daily and communal life" were considered more important subjects for history than great men or major events.

In response to the many unanswered questions, Fischer devotes a series of appendices to examining competing theories on subjects ranging from Champlain's birthdate to questions of authorship and authenticity in his surviving writings.

== Fischer's views on biography ==
External videos
- Presentation by Fischer on Champlain's Dream at the New York Historical Society, October 23, 2008, C-SPAN

In the introduction to this book, Fischer mentions the need for biography to balance between hagiography and iconoclasm.

In an address to the New York Historical Society, Fischer outlined the three rules of biography he learned from historians Francis Parkman and Samuel Eliot Morison:

1. "Go there"
2. "Do it"
3. "Then write it"

Partly in deference to this process, the introduction to the book is subtitled In Search of Champlain, and Fischer frequently mentions the role of "physical evidence" in understanding history.

== Reception ==
Tony Horwitz, writing for The Washington Post, described Champlain's Dream as "exhaustively researched," though he found it perhaps too effusive in its praise of Champlain's character. He notes that Champlain seems “almost perfect, and perfectly dull,” and despite Fischer's efforts, Champlain remains an abstract figure and does not come alive. Additionally, Horwitz finds the near avoidance of Champlain's love life and the trust placed in Champlain's own writings about how the Native Americans loved him to be odd. He adds that the absence of a dramatic event to provide a tight focus—unlike in Fischer's other books, Washington's Crossing and Paul Revere's Ride—disrupts the book's pace.

Max Boot, writing for The New York Times, argues that this work should be considered in light of the limited documentation available about Champlain's life and his "relatively obscure" place in our continent's history. He notes that Fischer's "plain, unadorned" prose is infused with "intriguing ideas," which capture the reader's interest by revealing how this man, about whom so little was known, was both versatile and accomplished. Boot appreciates how smoothly Fischer's narrative integrates these big ideas with Champlain's life.

In general, the response was positive, with Champlain's Dream being declared one of the best books of 2008 by The New York Times (100 Notable Books) and Publishers Weekly (Best Books of the Year). It was also a runner-up for the 2009 Cundill Prize.

== Bibliography ==
- Fischer, David Hackett (2008). Champlain's Dream: the European Founding of North America. New York: Simon & Schuster. ISBN 9781416593324.
