= David Hackett Fischer =

American historian (born 1935)

- Born: December 2, 1935 (age 90); Baltimore, Maryland, U.S.
- Education: Princeton University (AB); Johns Hopkins University (PhD)
- Occupation: Professor
- Writing career
- Genre: History
- Notable works: • Washington's Crossing • Champlain's Dream • Paul Revere's Ride • Albion's Seed • Liberty and Freedom • The Great Wave

David Hackett Fischer (born December 2, 1935) is an American historian. He is University Professor of History Emeritus at Brandeis University. Fischer's major works have covered topics ranging from large macroeconomic and cultural trends (Albion's Seed, The Great Wave) to narrative histories of significant events (Paul Revere's Ride, Washington's Crossing) to explorations of historiography (Historians' Fallacies, in which he coined the term "historian's fallacy").

== Early and personal life ==
Fischer was born in Baltimore in 1935 to John Henry Fischer and his wife, Norma née Frederick. His father, an educator, would eventually become the superintendent of Baltimore schools and, after that, dean and president of Columbia Teachers College. He has a brother, Miles. He received an A.B. from Princeton University in 1958 and a Ph.D. from Johns Hopkins University in 1962. He married Judith Hummel Fischer in 1960, and has two children with her. He was raised Lutheran, and is of Protestant faith.

== Career ==
Fischer has been on the faculty of Brandeis University for 50 years, where he is known for being interested in his students and history.

He is best known for two major works: Albion's Seed (1989), and Washington's Crossing (2004). In Albion's Seed, he argues that core aspects of American culture stem from four British folkways and regional cultures and that their interaction and conflict have been decisive factors in U.S. political and historical development. In Washington's Crossing, Fischer provides a narrative of George Washington's leadership of the Continental Army in the winter of 1776–1777 during the American Revolutionary War. He has also been known for his study of how historians study the past and common fallacies they make, as there are no agreed upon canons of historical proof among general historians.

Fischer was admitted as an honorary member of The Society of the Cincinnati in 2006. He is a member of the board of the College of the Atlantic in Bar Harbor, Maine.

== Awards ==
Washington's Crossing (2004) won the 2005 Pulitzer Prize for History and was a 2004 finalist for the National Book Award in the Nonfiction category.

He received the 2006 Irving Kristol Award from the American Enterprise Institute.

In 2008, he published Champlain's Dream, an exploration of Samuel de Champlain, the French explorer and founder of Quebec City. The book was a runner-up in the 2009 Cundill Prize.

In 2015, Fischer was named the recipient of the Pritzker Literature Award for Lifetime Achievement in Military Writing.

In 2022, Fischer received the Distinguished Patriot Award from the National Society of the Sons of the American Revolution (SAR). The award, one of the Society’s highest national honors, recognizes individuals who have made exceptional contributions to the United States through scholarship, public service, or civic leadership. Fischer was honored for his work in American historical studies, particularly his book African Founders, which examines the influence of African cultures on early American society. The award was presented during the SAR’s annual National Congress.

In addition to these literary awards, he has been recognized for his commitment to teaching with the 1990 Carnegie Prize as Massachusetts Professor of the Year and the Louis Dembitz Brandeis Prize for Excellence in Teaching.

== Selected works ==
External videos
- Booknotes interview with Fischer on Paul Revere's Ride, July 17, 1994, C-SPAN
- Presentation by Fischer on Champlain's Dream at the New York Historical Society, October 23, 2008, C-SPAN
- Presentation by Fischer on Washington's Crossing, February 26, 2004, C-SPAN

- Historians' Fallacies: Toward a Logic of Historical Thought (1970) ISBN 0-06-131545-1
- The Revolution of American Conservatism: The Federalist Party in the Era of Jeffersonian Democracy (1976) ISBN 0-226-25135-7
- Growing Old in America (1977) Series: Chester Bland—Dwight E. Lee Lectures in History.
- Concord: The Social History of a New England Town 1750–1850 (1984) (Editor)
- Albion's Seed: Four British Folkways in America (1989) ISBN 0-19-503794-4. Albion's Seed was intended to be the first book in a planned five-volume series, America: A Cultural History. The second volume was to have been American Plantations.
- Paul Revere's Ride (1994), Oxford University Press, ISBN 0-19-508847-6
- The Great Wave: Price Revolutions and the Rhythm of History (1996) ISBN 0-19-505377-X
- Bound Away: Virginia and the Westward Movement (2000), with James C. Kelly, University of Virginia Press, ISBN 0-81-391773-5
- Washington's Crossing (2004) ISBN 0-19-517034-2
- Liberty and Freedom: A Visual History of America's Founding Ideas (2005) ISBN 0-19-516253-6
- Champlain's Dream: The European Founding of North America (2008) ISBN 9781416593324
- Fairness and Freedom: A History of Two Open Societies: New Zealand and the United States (2012) ISBN 9780199832705
- African Founders: How Enslaved People Expanded American Ideals (2022) ISBN 9781982145095
