= Wav (disambiguation) =

WAV is a computer file format for waveform audio.

Wav or WAV may also refer to:

== Arts and entertainment ==
- Di WAV (born Daniela Carpio), Guatemalan-Swiss singer-songwriter
- WAV 1019 Cebu (DYFM), a former Philippine radio station (now True FM Cebu)
- WAV 1019 Davao (DXFM), a former Philippine radio station (now Favorite Music Radio Davao)
- WAV-TV, the former on-air branding of W58AV, a defunct low-power television station in Buffalo, New York

== Places ==
- Wavertree Technology Park railway station, Liverpool, England (by GBR code)
- Wave Hill Airport, Kalkarindji, Australia (by IATA code)
- Warbelow's Air Ventures, a regional airline in Alaska, US (by ICAO code)

== Vehicles ==
- Nikola WAV, an electric, personal watercraft
- UberWAV, Uber's Wheelchair Accessible Van

== Other uses ==
- Waka language, spoken in Nigeria (ISO 639 code: wav)
- Wide Angle Viewing, see Glossary of military abbreviations

== See also ==
- DWAV-FM 89.1, Metro Manila, Philippines
- WAVS AM 1170, Davie, Florida, USA
- wave (disambiguation)
