= Great Wave (disambiguation) =

The Great Wave usually refers to The Great Wave off Kanagawa (神奈川沖浪裏), a 19th-Century Japanese woodblock print by Hokusai.

Great Wave or The Great Wave may also refer to:

- The Great Wave (book), by David Hackett Fischer, 1996
- Great Wave Software, an educational software company
- Great Wave Pavilion, or Canglang Pavilion, in Suzhou, Jiangsu province, China
- The Great Wave, describing Jewish immigration to New York after 1880
- The Great Wave, a 2015 album by Skipping Girl Vinegar
- The Great Wave, Sète, a 19th-century photograph by Gustave Le Gray
- Great Wave mural, street art in Newtown, Australia
- The Great Wave, a 1931 novel by Mona Caird
- The Great Wave, a play Francis Turnly at the British National Theatre in 2018 directed by Indhu Rubasingham
- "The Great Wave", a 1994 episode of Aaahh!!! Real Monsters
- "The Great Wave" (The Lord of the Rings: The Rings of Power), an episode of the first season of The Lord of the Rings: The Rings of Power

== See also ==
- The Wave (disambiguation)
- Blue Wave (disambiguation)
- Julang-1 (Chinese: 巨浪-1, 'Huge Wave-1') missile
