= Wave model (disambiguation) =

Wave model is a concept of language development in historical linguistics.

A wave model is a theoretical concept comparing a phenomenon of any type to any part of a physical wave.

Wave model can refer to:

- Wind wave model, a mathematical model of sea waves
- Density wave model, a mathematical model of a spiral galaxy
- Kinematic wave model, an explanation of traffic flow

== See also ==
- Wave (disambiguation)
