= Jeet Rama =

Indian professional wrestler (born 1981)

Personal information
- Born: Satender Dagar; 12 January 1981 (age 45) Sonipat district, Haryana, India

Professional wrestling career
- Ring name(s): Jeet Rama; Satender Ved Pal
- Billed height: 6 ft 6 in (198 cm)
- Billed weight: 235 lb (107 kg)
- Trained by: WWE Performance Center
- Debut: 29 September 2015

Satender Dagar (born 12 January 1981) is an Indian professional wrestler and executive. He is best known for his tenures with WWE, where he competed in their developmental territory NXT under the ring name Jeet Rama. Following his WWE career, Jeet transitioned into a leadership role in Indian professional wrestling and currently heads Pro Wrestling Rebellion. He also served as the Chief Operating Officer (COO) of Wrestling Xtreme Mania (WXM), India’s premier pro wrestling promotion.

== Early life ==
Born in Baghru village of Sonipat District, Haryana, Satender was a ten-time kushti heavyweight amateur wrestling champion and three-time winner of the Hind Kesari award in India.

== Professional wrestling career ==
=== WWE (2015–2021) ===
On 2 June 2015 it was reported that Satender, along with fellow Indian recruit Lovepreet Sangha, had been signed by WWE and would be reporting to the WWE Performance Center for training. He made his in-ring debut at a NXT live event in Fort Pierce, Florida on 29 September 2015, competing in a battle royal. He made his singles debut for the company under the ring name Jeet Rama at a WWE live event in New Delhi on 15 January 2016, defeating Chad Gable. Since then he has competed several times mostly during NXT live events. Jeet Rama and Kishan Raftar once again teamed up against The Miztourage (Curtis Axel and Bo Dallas) in which they came out victorious at New Delhi on 7 December 2017. On 10 February 2018, Jeet Rama teamed with Kassius Ohno to take on The Forgotten Sons (Steve Cutler and Wesley Blake) at an Orlando NXT live event, in which they were defeated. On 26 January 2021, Jeet Rama made his TV debut against AJ Styles at Superstar Spectacle in a losing effort, but was praised for his performance. On 15 October, he made his debut on 205 Live in a losing effort against Boa. On the 22 October episode of 205 Live, Rama faced Xyon Quinn in a losing effort. On the 29 October episode of 205 Live, Rama was again defeated by Boa. On the 2 November episode of NXT 2.0, Rama was defeated by a debuting Solo Sikoa in what would be his last match before he was released from his contract on 4 November 2021.

=== Wrestling Xtreme Mania (2025–2026) ===
Jeet Rama along with Rishi Singh launched WXM with their supercard event WXM Powerbomb in Mumbai on 2 May 2025. Jeet serves as COO to the company with Rishi being the CEO. In March 2026, he departed WXM along with writers/producers Mansoor, and Mark Dallas.

=== Pro Wrestling Rebellion (2026—present) ===
On May 11, 2026, Jeet announced the launch of a new professional wrestling promotion, Pro Wrestling Rebellion. He was joined by Mansoor, Mark Dallas and Scott Fillan.
