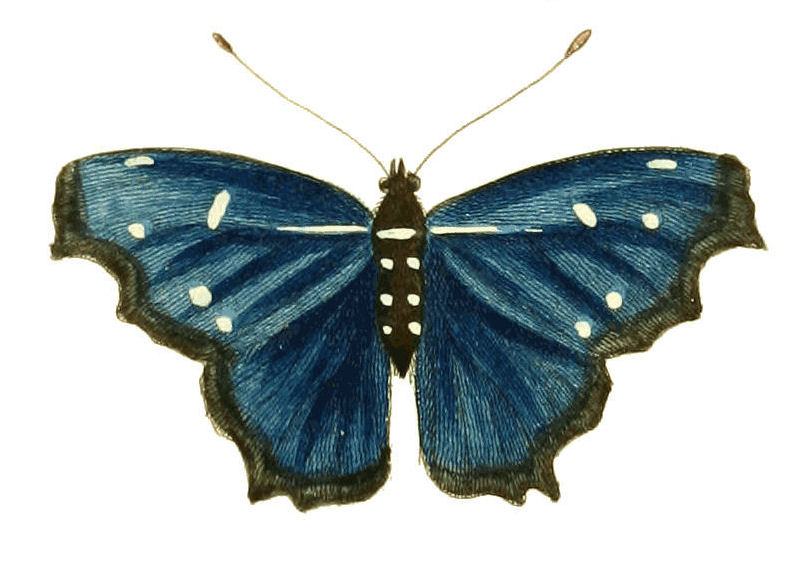
- Illustration by Dru Drury

Scientific classification
- Domain: Eukaryota
- Kingdom: Animalia
- Phylum: Arthropoda
- Class: Insecta
- Order: Lepidoptera
- Family: Nymphalidae
- Genus: Myscelia
- Species: M. orsis

Binomial name
- Myscelia orsis (Drury, 1782)

Synonyms
- Papilio orsis Drury, 1782; Papilio oisis Fabricius, 1793; Papilio blandina Fabricius, 1793; Sagaritis orseis Hübner, [1821]

= Myscelia orsis =

Species of butterfly

Myscelia orsis is a species of nymphalid butterflies native to Brazil. It was first described by Dru Drury in 1782.

== Description ==
Upperside: Antennae, thorax, and abdomen brown, the latter having six spots on it. Wings very dark changeable blue; anterior having a pale streak crossing them a little way on each side the thorax, with several other small ones on other parts.

Underside: Palpi very small, hairy, and white. Thorax, legs and abdomen white. Wings pale red brown, having a shade of darker colour running along their external edges, and on the anterior ones are placed two faint-coloured streaks, running from the external edges towards the middle of the wings. Margins of the wings angulated and dentated. Wingspan 57 mm (2.2 in).
