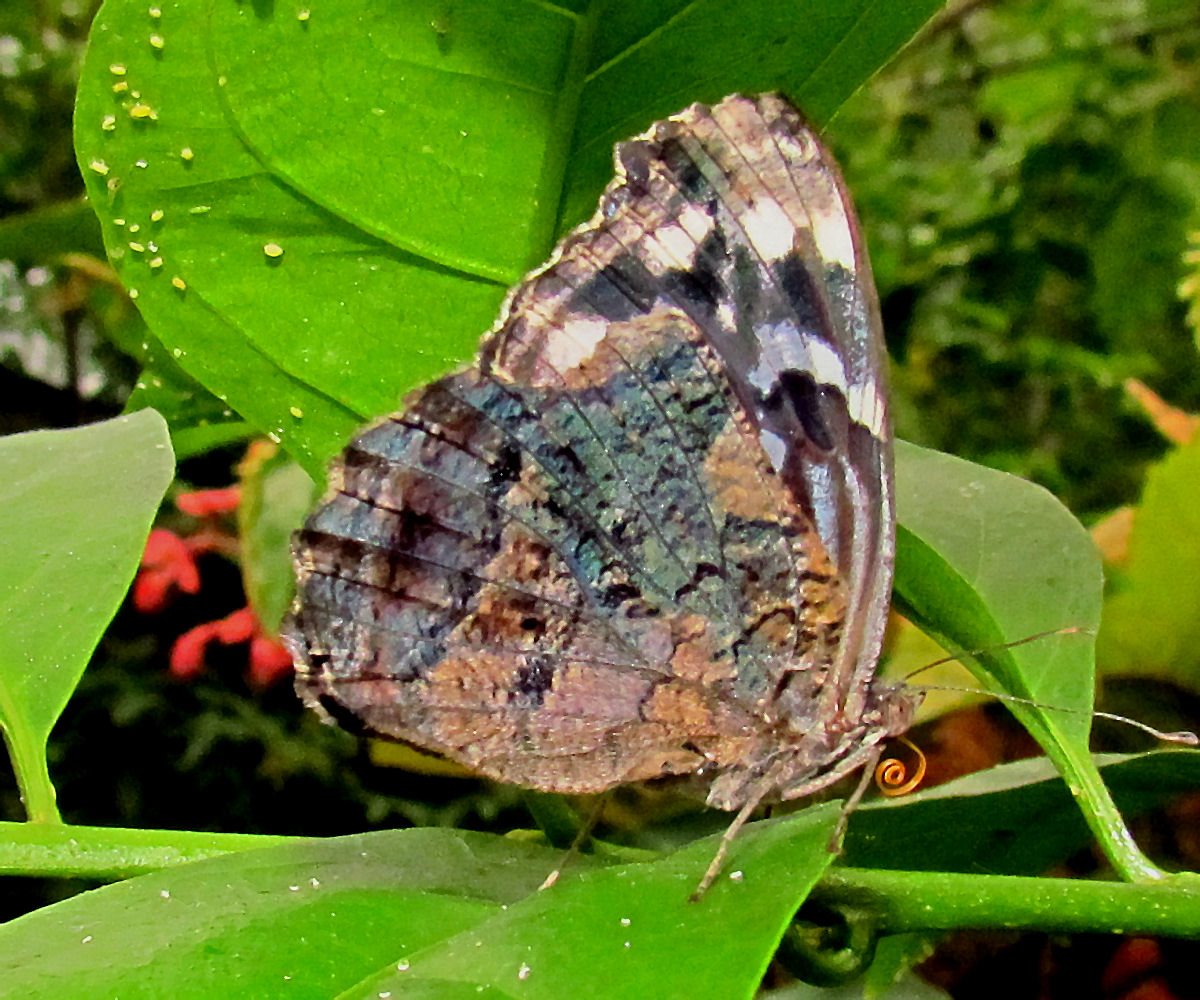
- Underside
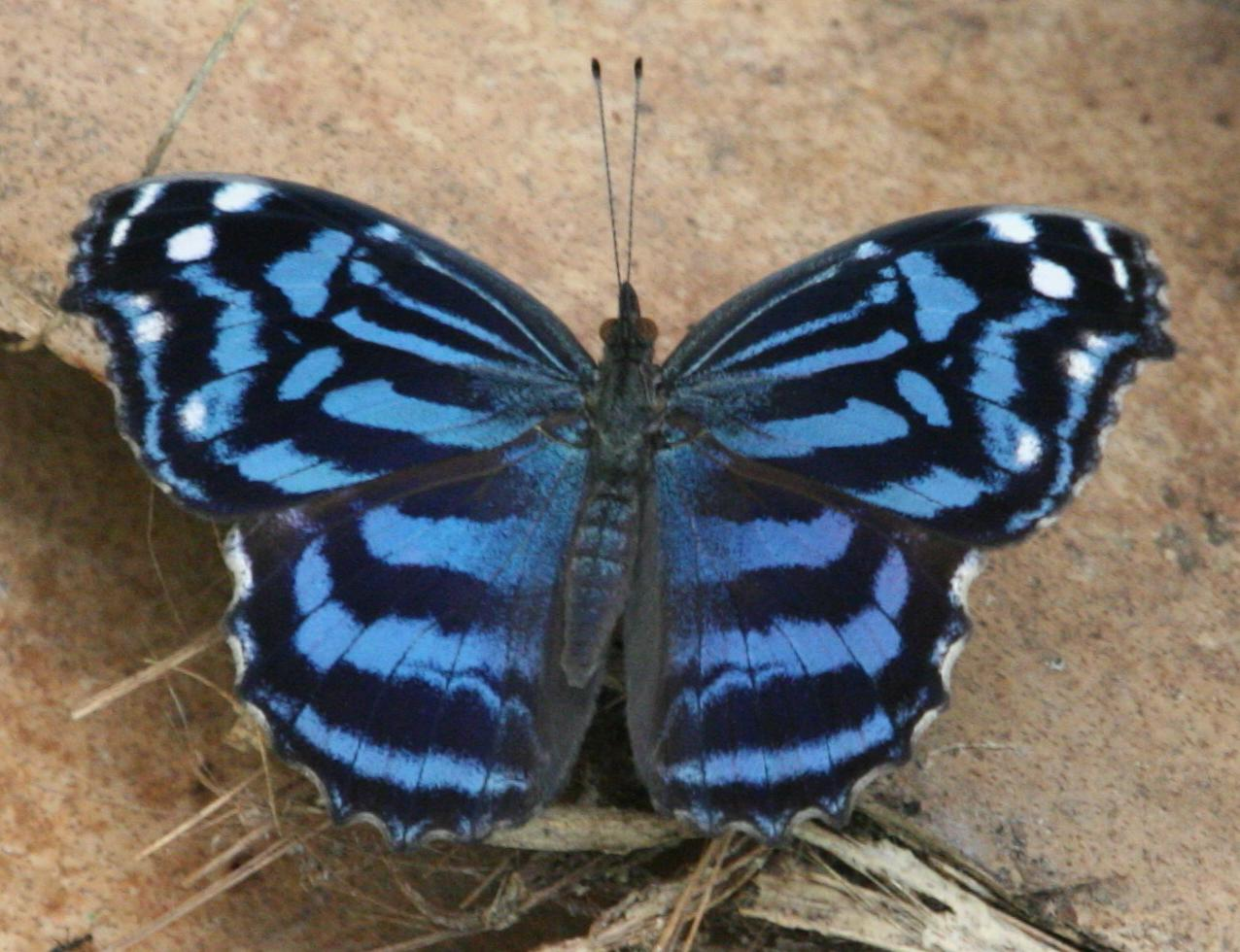
- Topside

Conservation status
- Secure (NatureServe)

Scientific classification
- Domain: Eukaryota
- Kingdom: Animalia
- Phylum: Arthropoda
- Class: Insecta
- Order: Lepidoptera
- Family: Nymphalidae
- Genus: Myscelia
- Species: M. ethusa

Binomial name
- Myscelia ethusa (Doyère, [1840])

Synonyms
- Cybdelis ethusa Doyère, [1840]; Myscelia rogenhoferi R. Felder, 1869; Myscelia cyanecula C. Felder & R. Felder, [1867]; Myscelia pattenia Butler & H. Druce, 1872

= Myscelia ethusa =

Species of butterfly

Myscelia ethusa, the Mexican bluewing or blue wing, is a butterfly of the family Nymphalidae. The species was first described by Louis Michel François Doyère in 1840. It is found from Colombia north through Central America to Mexico. Strays can be found up to the lower Rio Grande Valley of Texas in the United States.

The wingspan is 64–76 mm (2.5–3.0 in). Many generations occur per year.

The larvae feed on the Dalechampia species. Adults feed on rotting fruit.

== Subspecies ==
Listed alphabetically:

- M. e. chiapensis Jenkins, 1984 (Mexico)
- M. e. cyanecula C. Felder & R. Felder, 1867 (Mexico)
- M. e. ethusa (Mexico)
- M. e. pattenia Butler & H. Druce, 1872 (Guatemala and Costa Rica)
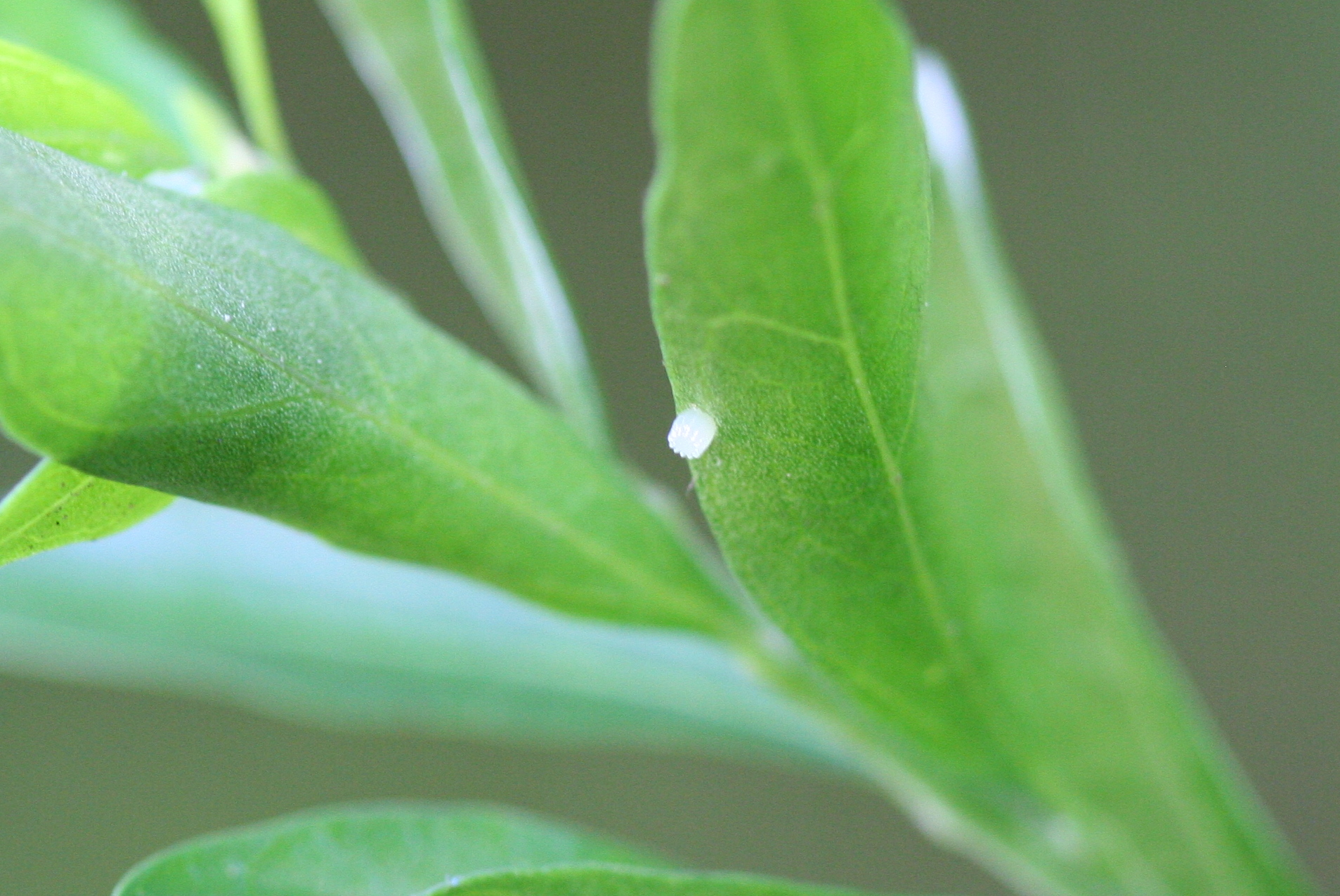
Egg

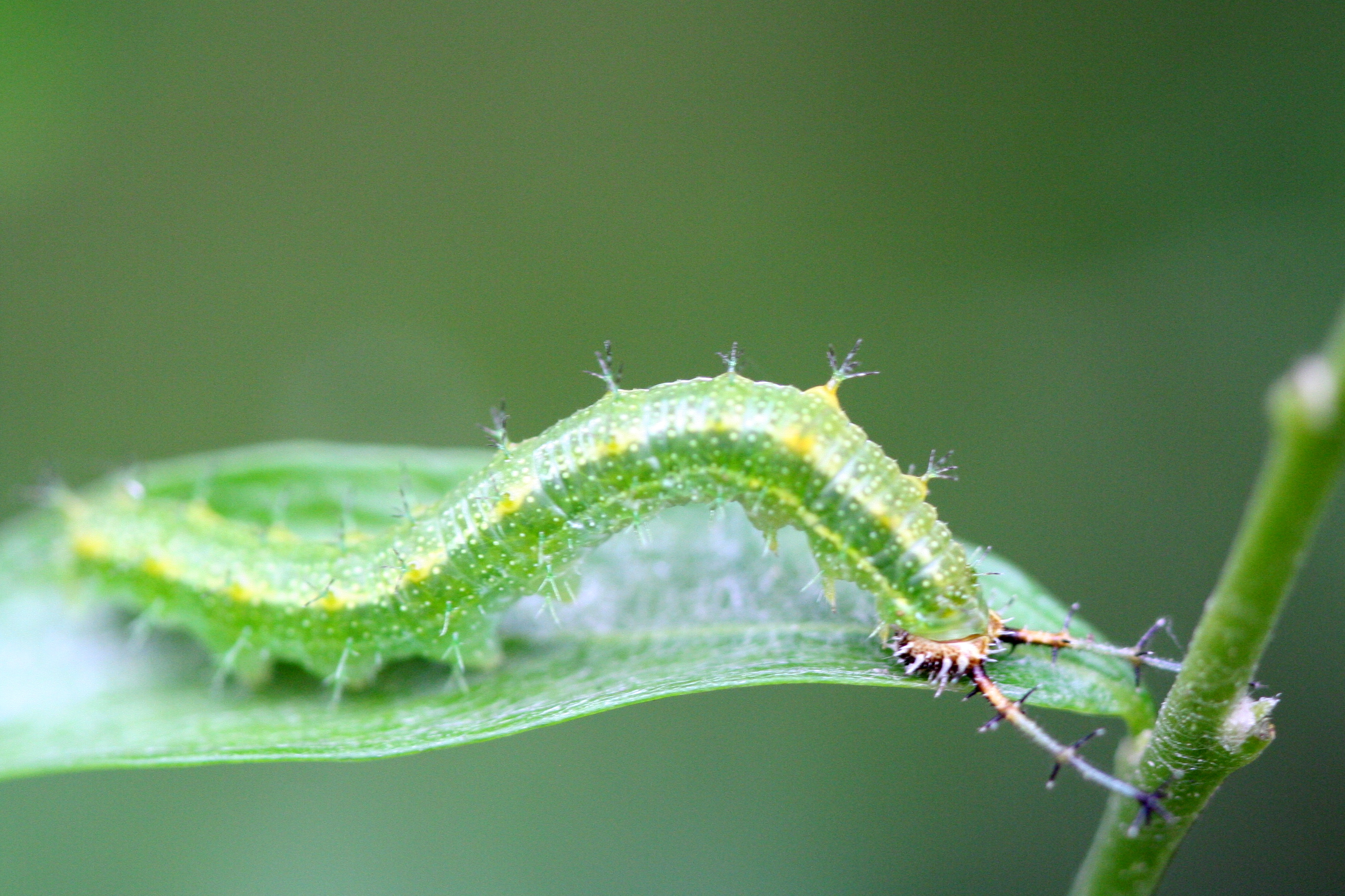
Caterpillar
