= Wrestling Xtreme Mania =

Indian professional wrestling promotion

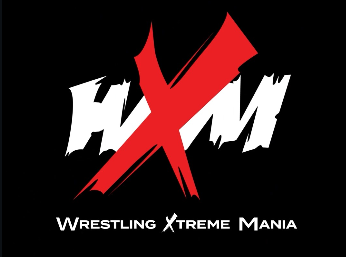
- Wreslting Xtreme Mania's logo
- Acronym: WXM
- Founded: 2025; 1 year ago
- Headquarters: Gurugram, India
- Founder(s): Rishi Singh; Jeet Rama
- Website: wxm.world

Wrestling Xtreme Mania (WXM) is an Indian professional wrestling promotion based in Gurugram, India. The company was founded by Rishi Singh and former WWE wrestler Jeet Rama, and marked the first major wrestling promotion in India since the end of Ring Ka King in 2012.

== History ==
In March 2025, WXM Ground Zero, was staged as a multi‑day pilot taping at the WXM Performance Centre in Gurugram.

Following the pilot tapings, WXM scheduled its first major event, WXM Powerbomb, 2025, 2 May at the NSCI Dome in Mumbai with Raj the Maharaja vs. Sha Samuels main eventing the show. It was aired on YouTube in six parts starting from September 27, 2025 before being aired in its entirety on December 21, 2025. The card featured international stars such as Raj the Maharaja (formerly Jinder Mahal), Samuray del Sol (formerly Kalisto), Chris Adonis, and Axel Tischer, alongside Indian wrestlers including Kaptaan, Kevin Malik, and Dev. In 2025 November, they conducted tryouts for wrestlers, referees, managers, commentators and announcers.

On March 25, 2026, Jeet Rama Mansoor and Mark Dallas announced their departure from WXM, with Rama later starting a new promotion named Pro Wrestling Rebellion. On April 2, 2026, WXM announced that they would be partnering with Triller TV to simulcast Ground Zero and various premium live events.

== Programming ==
Beginning on December 2025, WXM began broadcasting its Saturday evening weekly show Ground Zero on YouTube.

| Program | Original release | Original networks | Notes |
|---|---|---|---|
| WXM Ground Zero | December 27, 2025–present | YouTube | WXM's weekly show. |

=== Events ===
| Event | Date | Location | Venue | Attendance | Main event | Notes |
|---|---|---|---|---|---|---|
| WXM Powerbomb | May 2, 2025 | Mumbai, India | NSCI Dome | 4,000 | Raj the Maharaja vs. Sha Samuels | Debut event |
| WXM High Voltage | February 16, 2026 | Gurugram, Haryana, India | WXM Performance Centre | c. 150 | Raj the Maharaja vs. Roy Skyler | |

== Championships ==
=== Current ===
As of November 12, 2026:

| Championship | Current champion(s) | | Reign | Date won | Days held | Defenses | Location | Notes |
|---|---|---|---|---|---|---|---|---|
| WXM World Heavyweight Champion | JAI Connection | Raj Dhesi | 1 | October 2, 2026 | 41+ | — | New Delhi, India | ????? |
| WXM Tag Team Championship | JAI Connection | JAI Connection (Baliyan Akki and Anthony Greene) | 1 | January 31, 2026 | 285+ | 1 | Gurugram, Haryana, India | This was a fatal four-way tag team elimination match, also involving Burner Brothers (Ricky Burner and Scotty Burner), B2B (Suraj and Regner) and Culture Inc (Malik Bosede and Eli Knight) and were last to be pinned at Ground Zero #6. |
