= The Wave =

The Wave may refer to:

== Arts, entertainment and media ==
=== Film and television ===
- The Wave (1981 film), a TV movie based on The Third Wave social experiment
- The Wave (2008 film) (Die Welle), a German film, also based on The Third Wave social experiment
- The Wave (2015 film) (Bølgen), a Norwegian film
- The Wave (2019 film), an American film starring Justin Long
- The Wave (2025 film) (La ola), a Chilean film by Sebastián Lelio
- The Wave (game show), a British game show
- Redes (film), a 1936 Mexican film known in English as The Wave

=== Literature and writing ===
- The Wave (novel), by Todd Strasser, based on the 1981 film
- The Wave, a novel by Lochlan Bloom
- "The Wave" (poem), by Gruffudd Gryg
- The Wave of Long Island, a New York newspaper
- Los Angeles Wave, a weekly newspaper in Los Angeles, California
- The Wave, a weekly newspaper in Huntington Beach, California published by the Orange County Register
- The Delaware Wave, a newspaper
- The Wave, San Francisco magazine where A Deal in Wheat was first published

=== Music ===
- The Wave (album), by Tom Chaplin, 2016, and a song from the album
- The Wave, a 2018 album by R3hab
- "The Wave" (Sneakbo song), 2011
- "The Wave" (Miike Snow song), 2012
- "The Wave", a song by Blake Shelton from the 2017 album Texoma Shore
- "The Wave", a 2018 single by Lion Babe
- The wave (music), a movement of post-hardcore and emo bands in the late 2000s and 2010s

=== Radio stations ===
- The Wave 96.4 FM, former name of Hits Radio South Wales, Swansea, Wales, U.K.
- CHWV-FM, Saint John, New Brunswick, Canada
- CHKX-FM, Hamilton, Ontario, Canada
- CJLS-FM, Yarmouth, Nova Scotia, Canada
- CKWV-FM, Nanaimo, British Columbia, Canada
- KANS, Emporia, Kansas, U.S.
- KTWV, Los Angeles, California, U.S.
- WNWV, Elyria, Ohio, U.S.
- The Wave, a German radio station owned by RTL Group

=== Visual arts ===
- The Wave (Courbet), several paintings between 1869 and 1870
- The Wave (Paul Gauguin), an 1888 painting
- The Wave, an 1896 painting by William-Adolphe Bouguereau
- The Great Wave off Kanagawa, or The Wave, a 19th-century Japanese woodblock print by Hokusai

== Other uses ==
- The Wave (audience), a stadium cheer in sports
- The Wave (company), a British artificial wave pool company
- The Wave (Gold Coast), a residential skyscraper in Australia
- The Wave (streetcar), Fort Lauderdale, Florida's planned streetcar line
- The Wave (Vejle), a residential building complex in Vejle, Denmark
- The Wave (Arizona), a sandstone formation
- The Wave, Coventry, an indoor waterpark in Coventry, UK
- The Wave Transit System, Mobile, Alabama, U.S.
- Western Washtenaw Area Value Express, also known as The WAVE, a Michigan bus system

== See also ==
- Wave (disambiguation)
- Great Wave (disambiguation)
- The Waves, a 1931 novel by Virginia Woolf
- The Pearl and the Wave or The Wave and the Pearl, an 1862 painting by Paul-Jacques-Aimé Baudry
- We Are the Wave, a German web TV series, based on the novel The Wave
