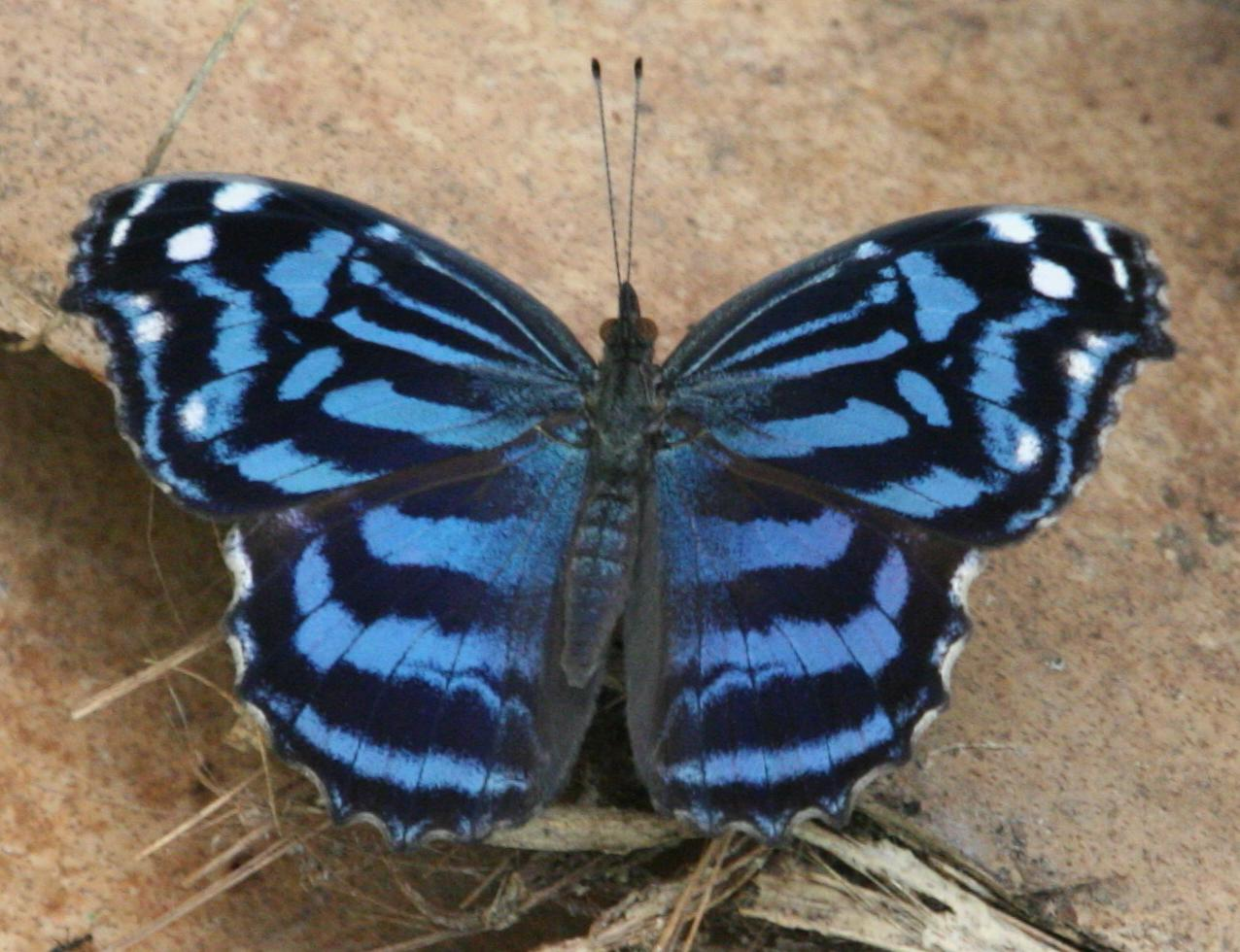
- Myscelia ethusa

Scientific classification
- Kingdom: Animalia
- Phylum: Arthropoda
- Clade: Pancrustacea
- Class: Insecta
- Order: Lepidoptera
- Family: Nymphalidae
- Tribe: Epicaliini
- Genus: Myscelia; Doubleday, 1844

Synonyms
- Sagaritis Hübner, [1821]

= Myscelia =

Genus of brush-footed butterflies

Myscelia is a genus of nymphalid butterflies found in southern North America, Central America and South America.

== Species ==
The species in the genus are:

- Myscelia aracynthia (Dalman, 1823)
- Myscelia capenas (Hewitson, [1857])
- Myscelia cyananthe C. & R. Felder, [1867] – blackened bluewing
- Myscelia cyaniris Doubleday, [1848] – blue wave, blue-banded purplewing, tropical blue wave, whitened bluewing, or royal blue
- Myscelia ethusa (Doyère, [1840]) – Mexican bluewing or blue wing
- Myscelia hypatia Strecker, 1900
- Myscelia leucocyana C. & R. Felder, 1861
- Myscelia milloi Oberthür, 1916
- Myscelia orsis (Drury, [1782])
