= ConcertWare =

Music composition computer program

Screenshot of ConcertWare

ConcertWare is a music composition computer program made by Chad Mitchell of Great Wave Software for the classic Mac OS in 1984. Later versions were published by Jump! Software Inc. It was one of the first music programs for the Apple Macintosh, and its first version could play four voices using the Mac's built-in speakers.

ConcertWare+ was available in both a MIDI version, which supported MIDI keyboards, and a non-MIDI version, and it included three tools: Music Player and Music Writer (named MIDI Player and MIDI Writer for the MIDI version), and InstrumentMaker, which allowed users to create software instruments with by editing their "waveform, envelope, and vibrato". Later versions added an on-screen piano keyboard, harmonies generation, and support for 32 staves at a time.

The 1994 Jump! Software version of Concertware 1.5 was available for both Mac and Windows. In January 2000 Jump! Music discontinued support for all Macintosh products and by 2001 the company website was no longer in service.

== Reception ==
In 1986, MacWorld's Stephen Levy wrote that ConcertWare "[passed] the Jaw Drop Test" for its Music Player component's visual depictions of MIDI instruments as they played. While he found that the manual "bordered on cryptic", he praised the program's multitrack support and compatibility with the Casio CZ-101.

Reviewing version 1.5, MacUser magazine's Christopher Breen called ConcertWare "one of [the] early pioneers" of music notation software, but criticized its stagnation, stating that the program would only be adequate for "entry-level musicians and hobbyists". He also criticized its clunky workflow that required users to use the Print Preview to see the combined score and text before making adjustments.
