= USS Wave =

Ship name

USS Wave has been the name of more than one United States Navy ship, and may refer to:

- USS Wave (1836), a schooner commissioned in 1836 and in service until 1846.
- USS Wave (1863), a gunboat commissioned in 1863 and captured by Confederate forces in 1864 during the American Civil War.
- USS Wave (SP-1706), a fishing trawler identified for World War I U.S. Navy service as a minesweeper and ordered delivered in 1917 and 1918 but never actually taken over by the Navy.
- USS Wave (YFB-10), a ferryboat commissioned in 1916 and struck in 1938.
