= Washington's Crossing (book) =

Book by David Hackett Fischer

- First edition
- Author: David Hackett Fischer
- Cover artist: Emanuel Leutze, Washington Crossing the Delaware - 1851
- Genre: Non-fiction
- Publisher: Oxford University Press
- Publication date: 2004
- Pages: 576
- ISBN: 0-19-517034-2 (hardcover); ISBN 0-19-518159-X (paperback)
- OCLC: 53075605
- Dewey Decimal: 973.3/32 22
- LC Class: E263.P4 F575 2004

Washington's Crossing is a Pulitzer Prize-winning book written by David Hackett Fischer and part of the "Pivotal Moments in American History" series. It is primarily about George Washington's leadership during the 1776 campaign of the American Revolutionary War, culminating with George Washington's crossing of the Delaware River and the subsequent campaign, with the Battle of Trenton, the Battle of the Assunpink Creek, and the Battle of Princeton.

The main theme of Fischer's book is the concept of contingency history, one major theory of history. Contingency history is the idea that people's decisions matter, and it is because of these decisions that certain events take place. Washington's decisions changed the course of the Revolutionary War and ultimately led the Continental Army to victory.

== Organization ==
Fischer discusses the historical context of the crossing, including the crossing's precursors, the intensity of effort required to make the crossing itself, and the effects upon the outcome of the American Revolutionary War made possible by the success of the crossing and the brilliant exploitation. He follows up with more than 180 pages, divided into appendices, source citations, and acknowledgements.

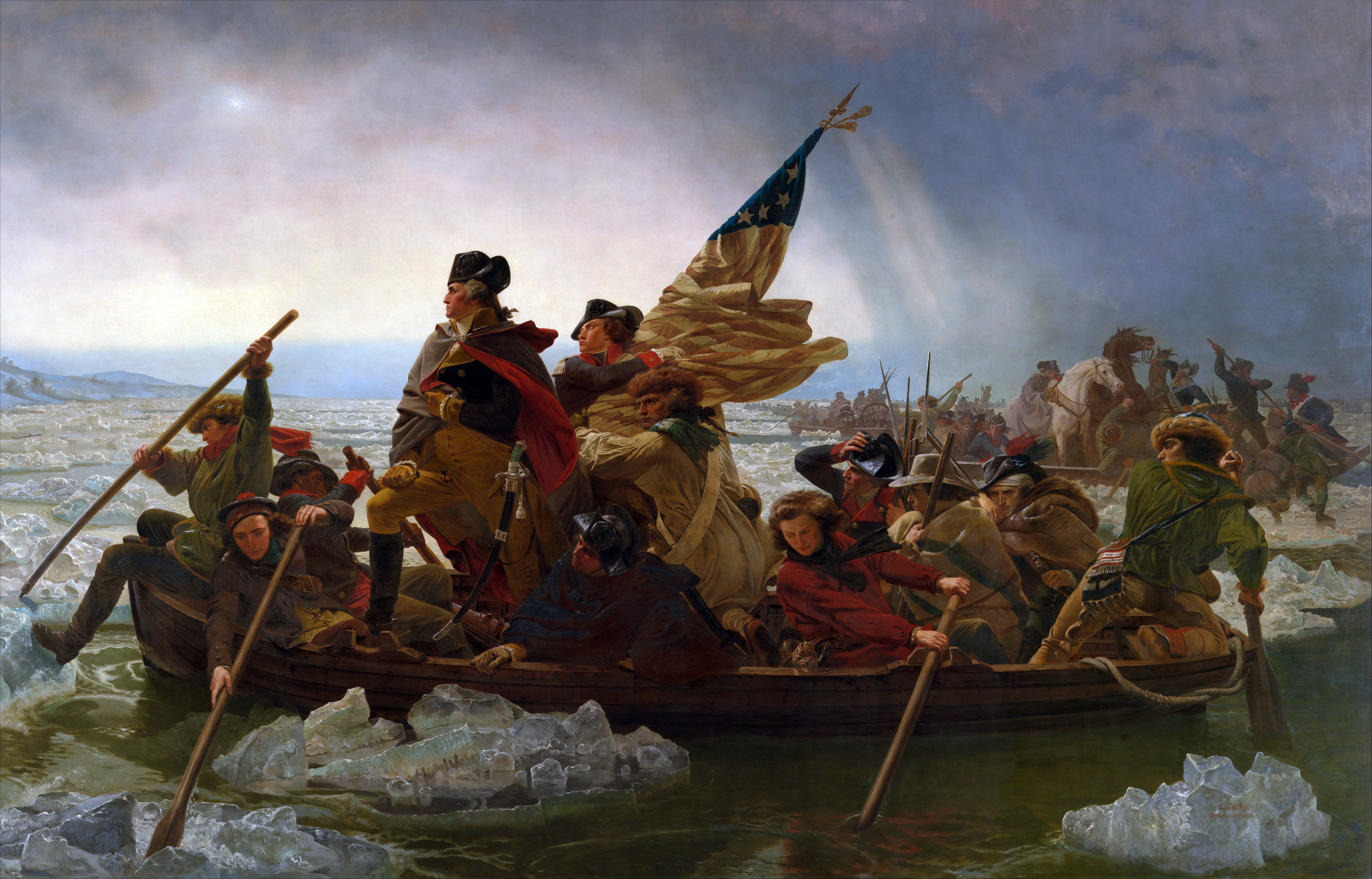
Emanuel Leutze's 1851 painting Washington Crossing the Delaware

Using as his starting point, the famous painting Washington Crossing the Delaware by Emmanuel Leutze, Fischer continues through the shift in momentum resulting from this campaign. He shows that before the crossing, the British were intent upon attacking and defeating the revolutionaries. After the crossing and subsequent campaign, the British focused on being attacked.

Fischer proceeds through the aftermath and finishes with a discussion of how a new, American way of fighting developed during the campaign surrounding the crossing, including an entrepreneurial spirit and a policy of humanity. The goal-oriented spirit still guides America's warfare: to win the war and then to return to everyday life with all dispatch. The Americans' policy of humanity to their defeated opponents was so attractive that large numbers of the Hessian enemy stayed in America, and more returned with their families following the war.

== Acclaim ==
Fischer's work is admired as one of the most comprehensive books on the critical and suspenseful turning point of the American War of Independence. The book was published in February 2004 and won the 2005 Pulitzer Prize for History. It was also a finalist for the National Book Award for Nonfiction

== See also ==
- Bibliography of George Washington
