= Great Wave Software =

Educational computer software company

Great Wave Software was an educational computer software company founded in 1984 by Dr. Chad Mitchell and Stacy Mitchell and was located in Scotts Valley, California. It was a division of Instructional Fair Group, which was based in Grand Rapids, Michigan, and was a Tribune Education company.

Products produced by Great Wave included:

- NumberMaze
- NumberMaze Challenge
- ReadingMaze
- KidsMath
- KidsTime Deluxe
- Reading Mansion
- World Discovery Deluxe
- World Discovery
- ConcertWare
- Prairie Explorer: Biomes of North America (Eddie Award Winner)
- Redwoods Explorer: Biomes of North America
- Axel's Whirled Math
- DaisyQuest & Daisy's Castle
- Dot-to-Dot
- Story Writer

McGraw-Hill Children's Publishing (now part of School Specialty Publishing) bought Great Wave Software, and the company no longer exists. All of Great Wave Software's products are out of print. School Specialty Publishing was later bought by Carson Dellosa publishing, and does not sell any apps for download. There have been no plans to reissue Great Wave Software's products as apps or to release any educational apps for download.
