= The Great Wave (book) =

1996 book by David Hackett Fischer

- The Money Changer and His Wife by Quentin Matsys, 1514
- Author: David Hackett Fischer
- Cover artist: Quentin Matsys
- Language: en
- Subject: Prices -- History. Business cycles -- History. Economic history.
- Publisher: Oxford University Press
- Publication date: 1996
- Publication place: United States of America
- Pages: 552
- ISBN: 978-0195053777
- OCLC: 33947935

The Great Wave: Price Revolutions and the Rhythm of History is a scholarly work by historian David Hackett Fischer, published in 1996 by Oxford University Press.

Hackett Fischer identified three complete monetary waves in European history, each consisting of a price revolution, featuring high inflation, followed by a war crisis, followed by a new equilibrium.^{p4} A fourth wave began, says Fischer, with the persistent monetary inflation of the 20th century.^{p182}

== First wave ==
Fischer says this began with the medieval price revolution, 1180-1350. There followed crisis in the 14th and 15th centuries, featuring the Black Death and Hundred Years' War. Then equilibrium during the early Renaissance, 1400-1470.^{p36-60}

== Second wave ==
This began with the “price revolution of the 16th century”, in fact lasting from about 1470-1590.^{p91} Crisis followed; depression, famine, the Thirty Years' War (1618–1648), English Civil War, Dutch Revolt and other conflicts.^{p98}

According to Fischer the Enlightenment equilibrium which followed lasted from 1660-1730.^{p102}

== Third wave ==
The price revolution of the 18th century began about 1729.^{p117} Commodity prices rose in England (sic), France and the United States (sic!).^{p120} large population increases occurred in most of Europe.^{p124} Wage rates failed to keep pace with grain price rises, and wealth inequality increased.^{p138} A rising spirit of rebellion led to a “revolutionary crisis”, 1789-1820.^{p141} The French Revolution was followed by the Napoleonic Wars and Latin American wars of independence. Stability was regained in the “Victorian equilibrium”, 1820-96. Consumer prices fell in England (sic).^{p158} There were revolutions in transportation, agriculture, industry and commerce.^{p168} But by the end of this era, young Englishmen were “bankrupt, bored and bloody-minded… the dark clouds began to gather.”^{p164}

== Fourth wave ==
Fischer identifies a further “price revolution” in the 20th century, by which time there were no new lands left to explore or colonise. The German hyperinflation of 1923 and the Great Depression of 1929 were followed by accelerating worldwide inflation after 1962.^{p203} Though inflation had ended by 1996,^{p233} Fischer speculated (1996) that “the great wave of the 20th century (approaches) its climax” and that “A major war in the Middle East or eastern Europe or elsewhere could reignite inflation.”^{p234}

== Conclusions ==
Fischer observed that these movements were not cycles but waves, with no fixed periodicity. Each wave had six common features. Chronologically, these were; 1), prolonged prosperity, 2) political disorder, 3) inflation spiral, 4) spiritual crisis, 5) revolution, deflation, 6) long era of equilibrium.^{p237}

== Limitations of the theory ==
Fischer predicted (1996) that “the price revolution of the 20th century has yet to reach its climax”.^{p240} Recent works by Steven Pinker and Joshua S Goldstein suggest that war and violence are decreasing, a trend which seems at odds with some of Fisher”s conclusions. Fischer did remind his readers that volatility would occur and increase.

Paul Krugman offers the comment that “most big-think books about history offer only strained analogies mixed with pretentious statements of the obvious.” Thomas J Archdeacon calls the theory “vivid”, “shrewd” and “strongly persuasive”, but suspects it is “blood in the water for academic sharks hunting outsiders venturing into their territory.” The argument that the world is heading for a crisis “has the vagueness of analogy.”

In a long and detailed review, John H Munro of Toronto university deplores the absence of mathematical modeling; the theory is “rather too neat” for him to accept.

The book has also been criticised for having a Eurocentric or western bias, with no data at all about the significant Asian economies.

== See also ==
- Cycle of violence
- Historic recurrence

== Notes ==
All pages are page numbers in the book.
