= The Wave (Paul Gauguin) =

1888 painting by Paul Gauguin

La Vague
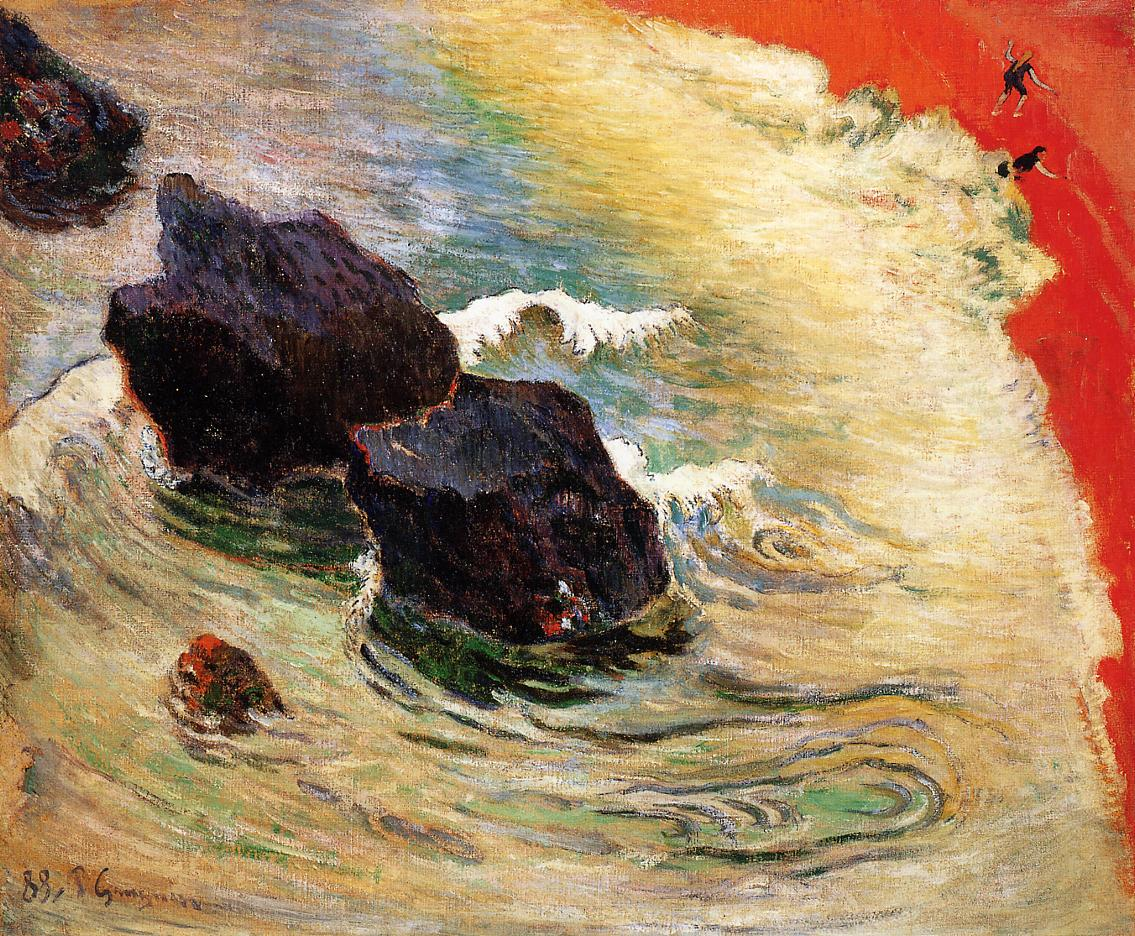
- Artist: Paul Gauguin
- Year: 1888
- Medium: oil on canvas
- Dimensions: 60 cm × 73 cm (24 in × 29 in)
- Location: Private collection

The Wave (French: La Vague) is an oil on canvas painting by Paul Gauguin, from 1888. It was purchased by David Rockefeller, an American banking executive, in 1966.

It was owned by the Paris-based American writer Alden Brooks by 1934, and later gifted to Filippa Brooks Veren of Big Sur, California, who sold it at auction at the Parke-Bernet Galleries, New York, on 19 May 1966, where it was bought by David Rockefeller.

== See also ==
- List of paintings by Paul Gauguin
