= John Henry Fischer =

American academic (1910–2009)

- Born: July 16, 1910; Baltimore, Maryland
- Died: December 18, 2009 (aged 99); Westwood, Massachusetts
- Education: Baltimore City College (1927); Maryland State Normal School (teacher's diploma, 1930); Johns Hopkins University (B.S., 1940); Teachers College, Columbia University (M.S., 1949; Ph.D., 1951)
- Occupation: educator
- Known for: Dean of Education and president of Teachers College, Columbia University; Baltimore’s school superintendent in the 1950s during desegregation
- Spouse: Norma Frederick

John Henry Fischer (July 16, 1910 – December 18, 2009) was an academic administrator who, as school superintendent, made Baltimore the first large American city to desegregate its public schools. He later served as dean and president of Teachers College, Columbia University for fifteen years.

== Early life and career ==
Fischer was born in Baltimore, Maryland on July 16, 1910, and raised near Lake Montebello in the city's northeast side. His father was a plant engineer for Simpson & Doeller Company, a Baltimore printing establishment, while his mother was a homemaker. After he graduated from Baltimore City College in 1927, he worked for a year as a clerk for a local seed company.

Gaining a teacher's diploma from Maryland State Normal School in 1930 led to his first job at the Montebello School, which he had attended as a seventh- and eighth-grader. He became a physical-education instructor at Curtis Bay Junior High School in 1933, then a science teacher for one year each at Hampstead Hill and Patterson Park High School.

His first experience as an education administrator came in 1935 when he was appointed vice principal at Gwynns Falls High School. He later served for four years in the same capacity back at Curtis Bay Junior High, beginning in 1938. He received a Bachelor of Science degree from Johns Hopkins University in 1940. He also served in the United States Coast Guard Reserve during World War II, helping to organize Maryland's Civil Defense program.

He first joined the Baltimore City Public School System administration in 1942 as its director of attendance and child guidance. He became the assistant superintendent in charge of general administration the following year, eventually being promoted to deputy superintendent. While tending to these responsibilities, he finished his postgraduate studies at Teachers College, Columbia University, earning a master's degree in 1949 and a doctorate in school administration in 1951.

== Desegregating Baltimore's public schools ==
He was appointed Baltimore school superintendent in 1953, holding the post until 1959. A month after the United States Supreme Court's ruling on Brown v. Board of Education in 1954, he met with the city's teachers to announce the desegregation of Baltimore's public schools. Despite protests and boycotts from parents, the transition was mainly peaceful because he received solid support from the board of education and mayor Thomas D'Alesandro, Jr. Fischer's low-key, unyielding approach to this matter earned him respect from educators and groups affiliated with the Civil Rights Movement.

== Death ==
Fischer died at age 99 of congestive heart failure at his home in Westwood, Massachusetts on December 18, 2009.
