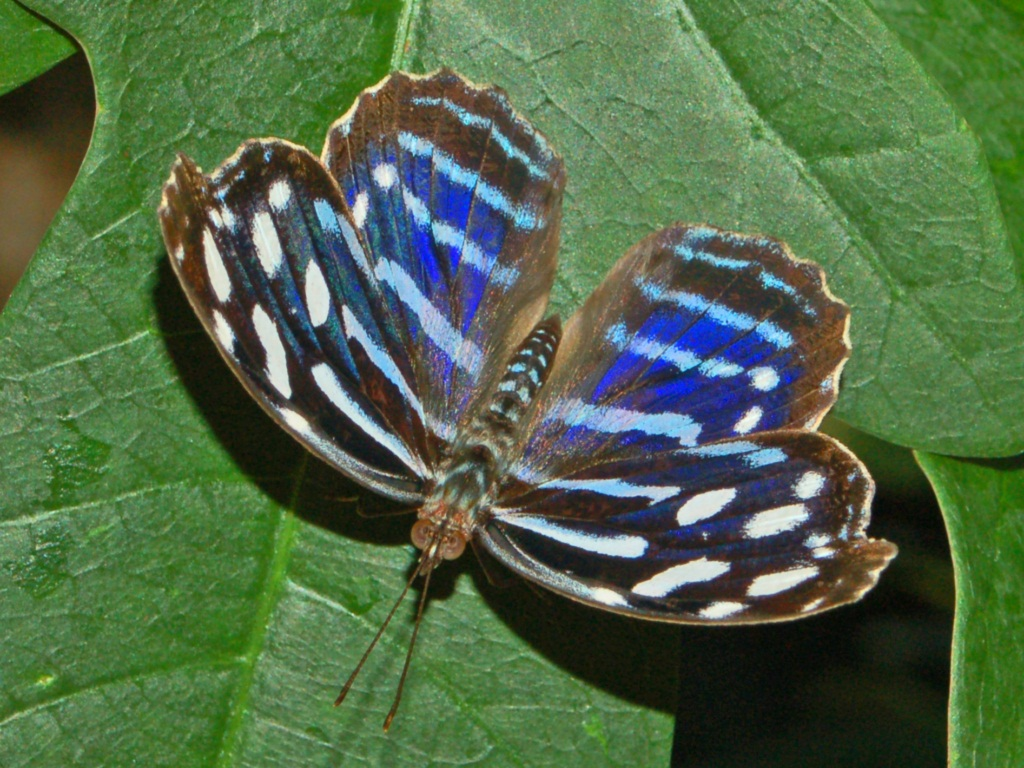
- Dorsal view
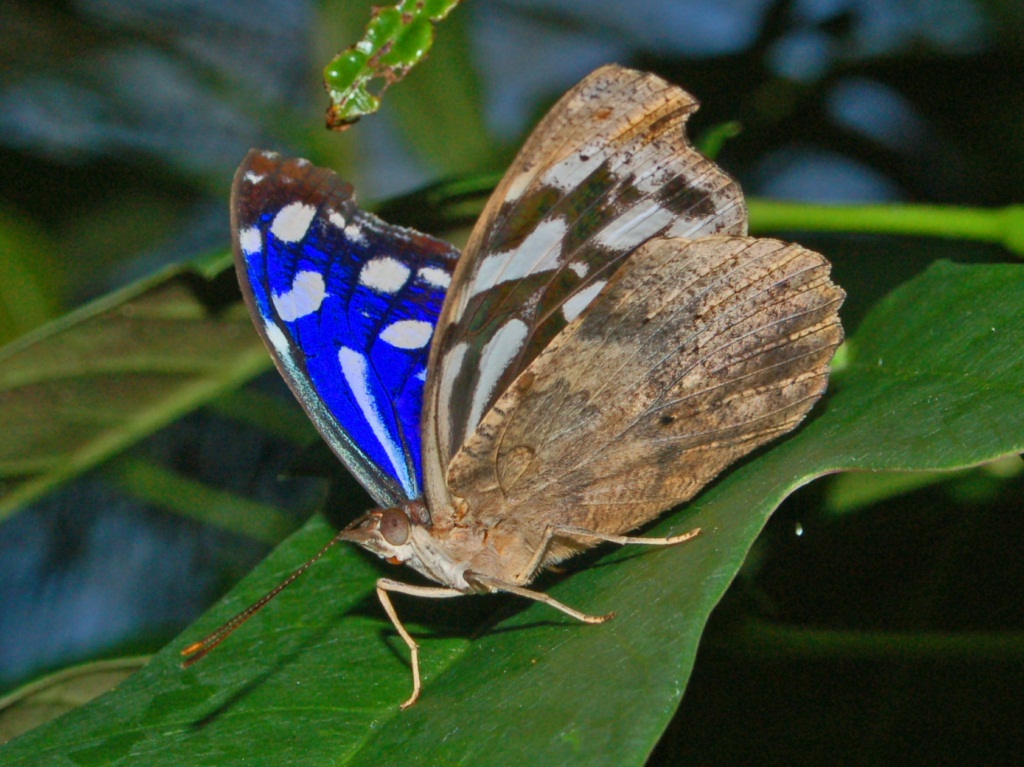
- Ventral view

Scientific classification
- Kingdom: Animalia
- Phylum: Arthropoda
- Clade: Pancrustacea
- Class: Insecta
- Order: Lepidoptera
- Family: Nymphalidae
- Genus: Myscelia
- Species: M. cyaniris

Binomial name
- Myscelia cyaniris Doubleday, [1848]

Synonyms
- Cybdelis cyaniris; Myscelia cyaniris

= Myscelia cyaniris =

Species of butterfly

Myscelia cyaniris, the blue wave, blue-banded purplewing, tropical blue wave, whitened bluewing, or royal blue, is a butterfly of the family Nymphalidae.

== Description ==
The length of the forewings reaches about 34–36 mm (1.3–1.4 in). The dorsal sides of the upper wings are bright blue with white transversal bands and white spots. The sapphire blue of the upper wings may appear black or neon blue depending on how the light is reflected. The undersides of the hindwings have a cryptic coloration, as they are mottled with different shades of color, varying from gray to brown, while the under sides of the forewings are black with white patches. The larvae feed on Dalechampia triphylla and Adelia triloba (family Euphorbiaceae). Adults usually feed on rotting fruit and animal dung.

== Distribution ==
It is found in Central America and northern South America, from Mexico to Honduras, Costa Rica, Panama, Venezuela, Colombia, Guyana, Ecuador, and Peru.

== Habitat ==
It is found from sea level to 700 m (2,300 ft) on the Atlantic slopes and is associated with rainforest habitats.

== Gallery ==
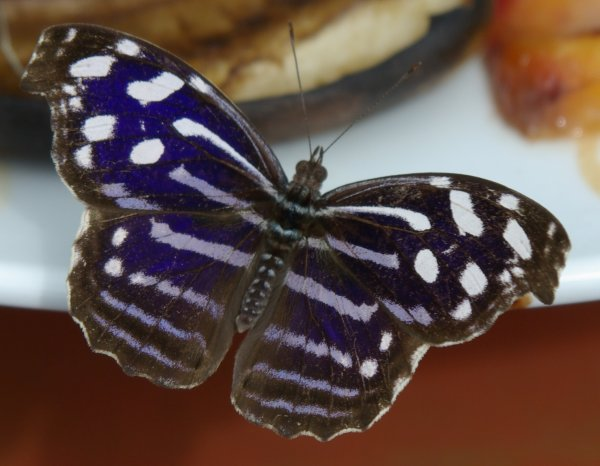
Dorsal view

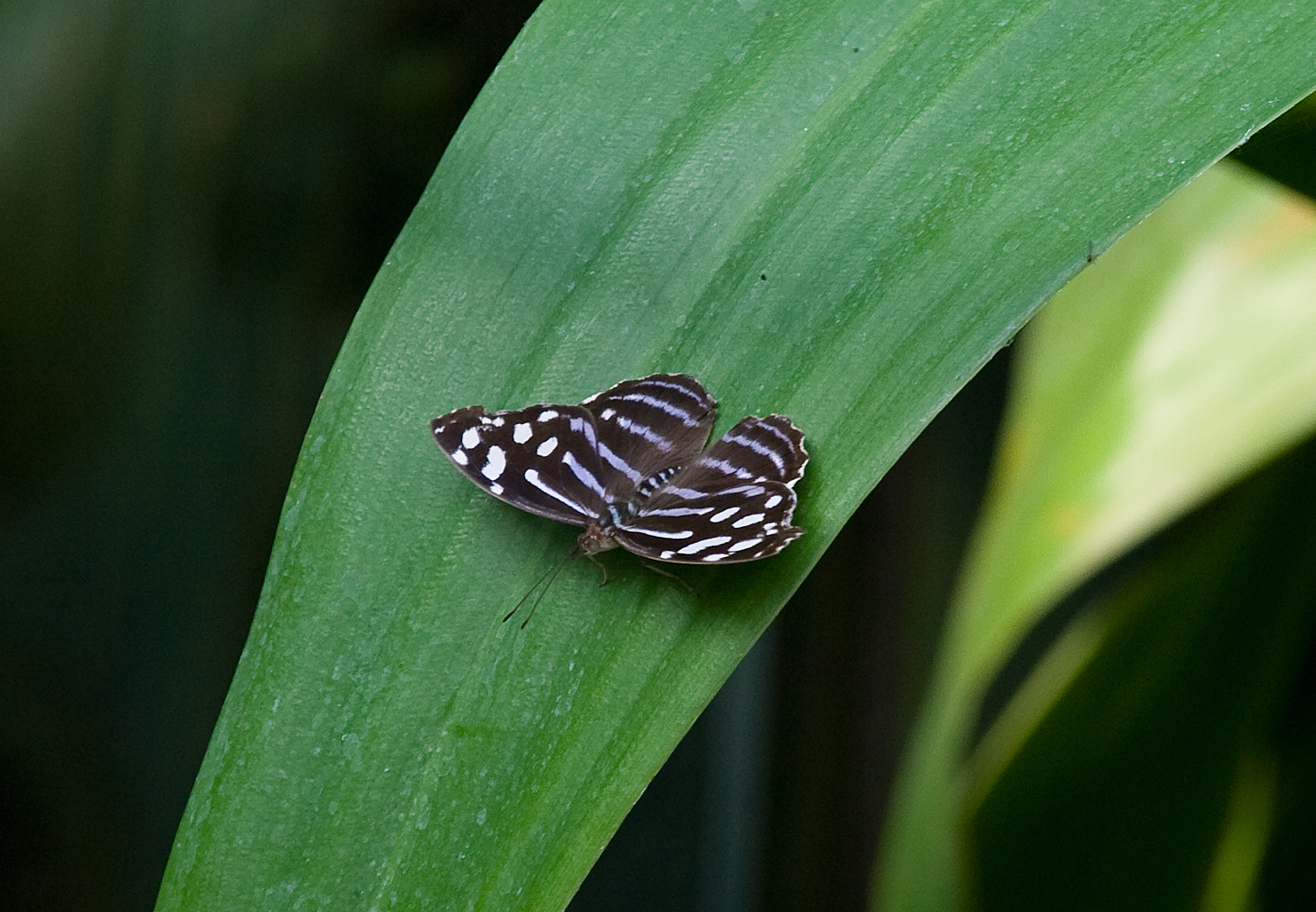
On leaf

== Subspecies ==
- M. c. albescens Hall, 1935 – (Venezuela)
- M. c. alvaradia Maza & Díaz, 1982 – (Mexico)
- M. c. cyaniris – (Mexico to Panama, Honduras, Costa Rica)
- M. c. millerorum Jenkins, 1984 – (Ecuador)
