= WAVS =

Radio station in Davie, Florida

- Davie, Florida; United States
- Broadcast area: Miami, Ft.Lauderdale area
- Frequency: 1170 kHz
- Branding: Heartbeat Of The Caribbean

Programming
- Format: World Ethnic

Ownership
- Owner: Alliance Broadcasting

History
- First air date: November 15, 1969
- Call sign meaning: WAVeS

Technical information
- Licensing authority: FCC
- Facility ID: 58309
- Class: B
- Power: 5,000 watts day 250 watts night
- Transmitter coordinates: 26°4′40.3″N 80°13′2.2″W
- Translator: 107.9 W300DF (North Miami Beach)

Links
- Public license information: Public file; LMS
- Webcast: Listen Live
- Website: WAVS1170.com

WAVS (1170 AM) is a radio station broadcasting a World Ethnic format focusing on Caribbean music. Licensed to Davie, Florida, United States, the station serves the Miami-Ft. Lauderdale area. The station is owned by Alliance Broadcasting.

== History ==
The station was established on November 15, 1969, and went on the air in August 1970 on 1190 AM as a news/talk station with 5000 watts daytime only, licensed to Fort Lauderdale, Florida. Both studio and transmitter are located in Davie currently.

Sally Jesse worked there before she was known as Sally Jesse Raphael. WAVS is the longest-running Caribbean radio station in the U.S. and has been in a Caribbean format for over 30 years.
