= WAVES (summit) =

Annual global event held in India

WAVES 2025 Summit
- 1–4 May 2025
- Official logo
- Host country: India
- Cities: Mumbai, India
- Venues: Jio World Convention Centre, Mumbai
- Website: wavesindia.org

The World Audio Visual & Entertainment Summit (WAVES) is an event focused on establishing India as a key hub for the media and entertainment industry, with a strong emphasis on cultural diversity.

The annual global summit provides a platform for leading media CEOs, entertainment icons, and creative professionals from around the world to engage in discussions on advancements in animation, gaming, entertainment technology, and both regional and mainstream cinema. It is designed to foster partnerships and pave the way for India's creative economy to gain international prominence.

WAVES aims to enhance intellectual property protection, encourage innovation, and strengthen industry collaboration. The summit will focus on attracting investment, fostering skill development, and positioning India as a global leader in the richly valued media and entertainment sector, while showcasing India as a business-friendly destination for global partnerships.

The inaugural edition took place from May 1 to 4, 2025, at the Jio World Convention Centre in Mumbai.

== 2024 ==
First edition of 4-day WAVES event was initially planned in Goa from 20 to 24 November, alongside the International Film Festival of India.

== 2025 ==
In the 117th episode of 'Mann Ki Baat,' Prime Minister Narendra Modi announced that India will host the inaugural World Audio Visual Entertainment Summit (WAVES) from 5 to 9 February 2025. However, it was postponed to May 2025.

In May 2025, the 4-day WAVES summit took place from 1 May to 4 May at Jio World Convention Centre, Mumbai. The event was inaugurated by Prime Minister of India Narendra Modi. The summit was attended by participants from over 90 countries, with a total of more than ten thousand delegates. The event covered discussions around various themes such as AI in media and entertainment, the impact of new technologies, broadcasting, infotainment, AVGC-XR, films, and globalization of the digital media. The event saw diverse art forms including traditional folk dances, martial arts and drumming performances.

The WAVES Bazaar recorded business deals worth over 1,300 crore rupees with filmmakers and creators from across the country. The event concluded with the adoption of the "WAVES declaration" by representatives of 77 countries at the Global Media Dialogue.
