= Spencer Krug discography =

This is a comprehensive listing of official releases by Spencer Krug, an indie rock musician from Canada. Spencer Krug is a singer, songwriter, and keyboardist for the indie rock band Wolf Parade, as well as Sunset Rubdown. He has also been a founding member in the bands Swan Lake, Frog Eyes, and Fifths of Seven.

== Wolf Parade ==
Release date	Title	Label
2003	Wolf Parade (4-song EP)	Self-Release
2004	Wolf Parade (6-song EP)	Self-Release
July 12, 2005	Wolf Parade (EP)	Sub Pop
September 27, 2005	Apologies to the Queen Mary	Sub Pop
June 17, 2008	At Mount Zoomer	Sub Pop
June 29, 2010	Expo 86	Sub Pop
May 17, 2016	Wolf Parade (EP 4)	Wolf Parade Productions
October 6, 2017	Cry Cry Cry	Sub Pop/Universal Music
January 24, 2020	Thin Mind	Sub Pop/Universal Music

== Sunset Rubdown ==
Release date	Title	Label
July 2005	Snake's Got a Leg	Global Symphonic
January 2006	Sunset Rubdown	Global Symphonic
May 2, 2006	Shut Up I Am Dreaming	Absolutely Kosher
October 9, 2007	Random Spirit Lover	Jagjaguwar
June 23, 2009	Dragonslayer	Jagjaguwar
September 20, 2024	Always Happy to Explode	Pronounced Kroog

== Moonface ==
Release date	Title	Label
January 26, 2010	Dreamland EP: Marimba and Shit-Drums	Jagjaguwar
August 2, 2011	Organ Music Not Vibraphone Like I'd Hoped	Jagjaguwar
April 17, 2012	With Siinai: Heartbreaking Bravery	Jagjaguwar
October 29, 2013	Julia with Blue Jeans On	Jagjaguwar
September 16, 2014	City Wrecker	Jagjaguwar
June 3, 2016	With Siinai: My Best Human Face	Jagjaguwar
November 2, 2018	This One's for the Dancer & This One's for the Dancer's Bouquet	Jagjaguwar
December 2, 2022	The Minotaur Instrumentals	Pronounced Kroog

== Solo albums ==
Release date	Title	Label
April 16, 2021	Fading Graffiti	Pronounced Kroog
June 17, 2022	Twenty Twenty Twenty Twenty One	Pronounced Kroog
October 13, 2023	I Just Drew This Knife	Pronounced Kroog
September 4, 2024	20202021 Solo Piano	Pronounced Kroog
December 5, 2025	Solo Rhodes	Pronounced Kroog
May 15, 2026	Same Fangs	Pronounced Kroog

== Swan Lake ==
Release date	Title	Label
November 21, 2006	Beast Moans	Jagjaguwar
March 24, 2009	Enemy Mine	Jagjaguwar

== Frog Eyes ==
Release date	Title	Label
February 2002	The Bloody Hand	Global Symphonic
June 6, 2006	The Future Is Inter-Disciplinary or Not at All	Acuarela Discos
May 1, 2007	Tears of the Valedictorian	Absolutely Kosher

== Fifths of Seven ==
Release date	Title	Label
August 22, 2005	Spry from Bitter Anise Folds	DSA
