= Wolf Parade (disambiguation) =

Wolf Parade is a Canadian rock band.

Wolf Parade may also refer to their albums:

- Wolf Parade (2003 EP)
- Wolf Parade (2004 EP)
- Wolf Parade (2005 EP)
- Wolf Parade (2016 EP)
