= Always Happy to Explode =

Studio album by Sunset Rubdown
- Released: September 20, 2024
- Genre: Indie rock
- Length: 41:26
- Label: Pronounced Kroog

Sunset Rubdown chronology
Dragonslayer (2009)	Always Happy to Explode (2024)

Always Happy to Explode is the fifth studio album by the Canadian art rock band Sunset Rubdown. Released September 20, 2024, it was the band's first studio album in 15 years and the first released on band member Spencer Krug's record label Pronounced Kroog. The album was recorded following the band's 2023 reunion tour, and it features a varied sound from their previous recordings due to the substitution in the lineup of a bass guitarist in place of their unavailable electric guitarist. Critics generally enjoyed the new iteration and album, with Exclaim! saying, "however long this reunion lasts, it's a welcome one".

== Background ==
Krug, a member of the indie rock band Wolf Parade since 2003, released his first full-length album under the Sunset Rubdown name in 2005 with Snake's Got a Leg, a collection of low-fi recordings made by himself in his bedroom. By the end of that year the act had been expanded into a full band, including Camilla Wynne Ingr, Jordan Robson-Cramer, and Michael Doerksen. They released an album in each of the two subsequent years: Shut Up I Am Dreaming in 2006 and Random Spirit Lover in 2007. Those were followed up by 2009's Dragonslayer and a supporting tour, after which the group dissolved. Despite not issuing formal notice of a breakup, Krug confirmed later that the break was not intended as a hiatus and the band had no intention of playing together further.

The band's reunion came about following a dream that Krug experienced 14 years later, in which Sunset Rubdown had already reunited and were enjoying themselves. Krug awoke with the realization that he wanted a reunion to occur and that it might be feasible. He contacted the other members who agreed to come to Krug's home on Vancouver Island, where they became reacquainted and played some of their old music. They decided to put together a tour, and if that went well they would consider recording an album. Following a successful tour, the band reconvened at Krug's home studio for practice sessions. Doerksen, the band's electric guitarist who had played with them during the reunion tour, was prevented from joining them for the album due to work responsibilities. He was replaced by Nicholas Merz, a bass guitarist who had opened for and sat in with the band during the tour.

== Composition ==
In addition to his work with Wolf Parade, Sunset Rubdown, and other bands such as Frog Eyes and Fifths of Seven, Krug has had an active solo career releasing music under the Moonface moniker and later under his own name. Along with releasing several studio albums, he has maintained a profile on the subscription-based service Patreon, where he releases at least one new song each month. The nine songs on Always Happy to Explode were chosen by the members of Sunset Rubdown from roughly 20 such songs Krug curated for the project, similar to how the band's previous albums had been composed of solo Krug compositions that were then expanded and arranged by the full band.

The album's lyrics were influenced by recent changes in Krug's life. He was residing in a secluded area and living a relatively quiet life, and he and his partner had their first child in 2020. Many of the songs' lyrics consist of Krug, who at one time would not have seen himself with such a life, communicating to that younger version of himself that he actually enjoys things as they are. Those themes combine on the album with those of general anxiety over the state of current events. Krug uses his music and lyrics as a form of therapy and as a way to process his thoughts, saying in an interview that "[t]he reason I'm not sad is because there's sadness in my songs".

== Recording ==
The band, whose members lived in different parts of North America and had limited time together, spent two weeks at Krug's home studio preparing for the recording sessions. Robson-Cramer became ill and missed a week of this rehearsal period. The band then traveled to the island of Gabriola to record with producer and engineer Jordan Koop. The small time frame the band had to complete the album resulted in sparser arrangements than their previous records, and many songs were recorded live "off the floor", with minimal overdubs. Despite not having a dedicated electric guitarist for the sessions, both Robson-Cramer and Merz were talented at the instrument and the band had planned on adding it in. While arranging and practicing the songs, however, they decided they preferred the more raw, pared-down versions, and only a small portion of the finished album includes electric guitar.

== Critical reception ==
Professional ratings
Review scores
Source	Rating
Beats Per Minute	7/10
Exclaim!	8/10
PopMatters	6/10
Spectrum Culture	75/100

Sunset Rubdown announced in July 2024 that the album would release the following September 20, fifteen years after their previous record. It released to generally favorable reviews. The reviewer for Exclaim! called the album "enigmatically compelling", and complimented the band on not relying solely on nostalgia with their first output following their reunion. Spectrum Culture acknowledged the difference in the band's sound without electric guitar but said that the instrument was not needed to create the "dense, lush, complicated" songs on the album. The reviewer especially praised Krug's "mesmerizing and vivid" lyrics, noting how they are often inscrutable but always engaging.

The reviewer for Beats Per Minute also made a point to appreciate the band's new sound and not mourn the loss of the denser instrumentation, saying "there is still magic to be made, even if it is a slightly different kind". They admitted that not everything on the album works, however, pointing to "All Alright" as an example (and noting that Krug himself regrets choices made during that song's production; he said in an interview that he hopes listeners will "love it for me, for I cannot"). TMRW Magazine considered the album as "the perfect entry point" for new listeners to the band, saying that while Krug's music is always at least somewhat adventurous, these particular tracks are "cozier" and more accessible than previous releases. PopMatters regretted the lack of intensity the album provides aside from the "immediacy" of lead single "Reappearing Rat", and remarked that it often sounds more like a Spencer Krug solo affair than a Sunset Rubdown collective effort. The reviewer still praised standouts like "Worm", calling it "maybe the simplest Sunset Rubdown track and arguably the most beautiful".

== Track listing ==
1. "Losing Light" – 5:14
2. "All Alright" – 3:31
3. "Candles" – 3:06
4. "Snowball" – 4:47
5. "Ghoulish Hearts" – 5:12
6. "Reappearing Rat" – 3:20
7. "Cliché Town – 6:02
8. "Worm" – 5:43
9. "Fable Killer" – 4:28

== Personnel ==
- Spencer Krug – piano, synth, acoustic guitar, vocals
- Camilla Wynne – keyboard, omnichord, vocals
- Nicholas Merz – bass guitar, vocals
- Jordan Robson-Cramer – drums, electric guitar, percussion, vocals
