= Apologies to the Queen Mary =

2005 album by Wolf Parade

Studio album by Wolf Parade
- Released: September 27, 2005
- Recorded: Audible Alchemy, Portland, OR, and Montreal; September 2004 to Spring 2005
- Genre: Indie rock
- Length: 47:48
- Label: Sub Pop
- Producers: Isaac Brock, except tracks 4, 5, and 7 by Wolf Parade

Wolf Parade chronology
| Wolf Parade (2005) | Apologies to the Queen Mary (2005) | At Mount Zoomer (2008) |

Apologies to the Queen Mary is the debut studio album by the Canadian indie rock band Wolf Parade, released on September 27, 2005, on Sub Pop. The majority of the album was produced by Modest Mouse frontman Isaac Brock at Audible Alchemy in Portland, with the band self-producing three further tracks in their home city of Montreal. It is Wolf Parade's only studio album to be recorded by its original four-piece line-up consisting of Spencer Krug, Dan Boeckner, Arlen Thompson and Hadji Bakara, with multi-instrumentalist and eventual fifth member Dante DeCaro joining the band after its recording.

The album was released to widespread critical acclaim and was nominated for the 2006 Polaris Music Prize. As of 2006, it has sold 67,000 copies in the United States.

== Background ==
Songwriting and vocals are split between guitarist Dan Boeckner and keyboardist Spencer Krug.

According to interviews with the band, the album is named after an incident in which the band was removed from the ocean liner Queen Mary for breaking down the door of a ballroom and staging a violent séance.

The song "Dear Sons and Daughters of Hungry Ghosts" refers to Pretas of Buddhist mythology. The "Hungry Ghosts" – beings who, because of actions in their past lives, are always hungry and thirsty, but cannot eat or drink – are used by Krug as a reference to his generation.

The songs "Killing Armies" and "Modern World (Original)" were added to the iTunes Music Store release. Killing Armies is taken from the 2004 EP and Modern World (Original) is from the 2003 EP.

The songs "Fancy Claps", "Same Ghost Every Night", and "This Heart's On Fire" were not originally from an EP. All of the other songs, including "Killing Armies", came from the three previous EPs, except "I'll Believe In Anything". This song appeared on the album Snake's Got a Leg by Sunset Rubdown (another Spencer Krug project), which was recorded in 2004 and released in July 2005.

Krug has stated that "You Are a Runner" is "more about who I am in relation to my family, my father. That song is just about, well, I'm not going to get into great detail, but my father is a certain way, and there are days when it's obvious to me that I could turn out that way, and that's not a way I want to be, and it has a certain effect on the people who are close to him, and then I see the people that are close to me getting affected in the same way. That's it on a basic level, I sort of…I don't want to get into it beyond those vague terms. "Grounds for Divorce" is just about breaking up. The divorce is symbolic, it's not a real divorce."

The music video for "I'll Believe in Anything" was named "Music Video of the Year" at the PLUG Awards.

In December 2025, "I'll Believe in Anything" received renewed attention when it was featured in the penultimate episode of the television show Heated Rivalry.

== Reception ==
Professional ratings
Aggregate scores
| Source | Rating |
|---|---|
| Metacritic | 83/100 |
Review scores
| Source | Rating |
| AllMusic | 4/5 stars |
| Entertainment Weekly | B+ |
| The Guardian | 4/5 stars |
| The Independent | 5/5 stars |
| The Irish Times | 5/5 stars |
| Los Angeles Times | 3.5/4 stars |
| NME | 7/10 |
| Pitchfork | 9.2/10 |
| Rolling Stone | 3.5/5 stars |
| Uncut | 3/5 stars |

Apologies to the Queen Mary is widely considered one of the most influential indie rock albums of the 2000s. As a result of the rave reception of the album, many music magazines feature Apologies to the Queen Mary in their best of the decade lists. The album achieved a score of 83 out of 100 on Metacritic, appeared in the Canadian edition of Time magazine's list of "Canada's Most Anticipated Indie Albums of the Year", and was shortlisted for the 2006 Polaris Music Prize.

Online music magazine Pitchfork placed Apologies to the Queen Mary at number 89 on their list of top 200 albums of the 2000s and placed "I'll Believe in Anything" at 95 on their list of The Top 500 Tracks of the Decade. Cokemachineglow named the record the 5th greatest album of the 2000s. LAS Magazine placed it at spot #38 of the greatest records of 2000-2009 while Stylus magazine and PopMatters placed it on spot #19 and #16 on their list of the best albums of 2005, respectively. It was also featured on the list of No Ripcord, taking spot number 12.

== Track listing ==
All music is composed by Hadji Bakara, Dan Boeckner, Spencer Krug, and Arlen Thompson; except "Modern World" and "Dinner Bells" by Boeckner, Krug, and Thompson

| No. | Title | Lyrics | Length |
|---|---|---|---|
| 1. | "You Are a Runner and I Am My Father's Son" | Krug | 2:54 |
| 2. | "Modern World" | Boeckner | 2:52 |
| 3. | "Grounds for Divorce" | Krug | 3:25 |
| 4. | "We Built Another World" | Boeckner | 3:15 |
| 5. | "Fancy Claps" | Krug | 2:51 |
| 6. | "Same Ghost Every Night" | Boeckner | 5:44 |
| 7. | "Shine a Light" | Boeckner | 3:47 |
| 8. | "Dear Sons and Daughters of Hungry Ghosts" | Krug | 3:39 |
| 9. | "I'll Believe in Anything" | Krug | 4:36 |
| 10. | "It's a Curse" | Boeckner | 3:12 |
| 11. | "Dinner Bells" | Krug | 7:34 |
| 12. | "This Heart's on Fire" | Boeckner | 3:59 |
| Total length: | | | 47:48 |

== Personnel ==
Wolf Parade

- Dan Boeckner – guitar, vocals
- Spencer Krug – piano, keyboards, vocals
- Arlen Thompson – drums
- Hadji Bakara – keyboards, electronics

Additional musician

- Tim Kingsbury – guitar (tracks 4, 5), bass (track 7)

Production

- Isaac Brock – producer (tracks 1–3, 6, 8–12)
- Wolf Parade – producers (tracks 4, 5, 7), mixing
- Jace Lasek – mixing (tracks 1–3, 6, 8–12)
- Chris Chandler – engineer
- Jacob Hall – assistant engineer
- Harris Newman – mastering
- Dusty Summers – design
- Matt Moroz – illustrations
