= Daddy's Hands (band) =

Canadian experimental rock band

Background information
- Origin: Victoria, British Columbia, Canada
- Genres: Noise rock, experimental rock, indie rock, post-hardcore, art punk
- Years active: 1996–2006
- Labels: Que Sera, Headhunter, The Mintaka Conspiracy, Kill Devil Hills
- Past members: Dave Wenger; Emily Bauslaugh; Jonah Fortune; Johnny Pollard; Ryan Mitchell-Morrison; Christoph Hofmeister; Brooklyn Cannon; Matt Law

Daddy's Hands was a Canadian experimental rock band formed in Victoria, British Columbia, Canada, by singer/guitarist Dave Wenger, bassist Emily Bauslaugh, drummer Jonah Fortune, and saxophonist Jonathan Pollard. Wenger and Bauslaugh had been involved in the British Columbian hardcore/emo scene before forming the band, being in bands M Blanket, Breakwater and Ache Hour Credo, and the band Floragore respectively. Daddy's Hands has released two demo tapes, one EP and two full-length albums. The band gigged extensively in the 90s, even playing a radio show with Nardwuar. Despite achieving little commercial success, the band has been referred to as highly influential in the West Coast music scene. Lead singer Wenger, highly regarded by some critics, has been referred to as Montreal's Peter Laughner.

== Releases ==
In 1996, the band released two demo tapes, a self-titled debut and Intelligent and Powerful. In 2000 they released a full album, Tutankhamun and a four-song EP in 2002 entitled Ghost in the Bong. Daddy's Hands' original lineup was intact until 2002 when Bauslaugh died of a drug overdose in her Montreal apartment. After Bauslaugh's death, Wenger's life took a downward turn and he started drinking more heavily. In May 2005, Wenger, the remaining members of the original lineup, and two new members began recording the band's last album, Welcome Kings. Before the album was released, Wenger was killed in a hit-and-run accident in Montreal on November 23, 2006. Welcome Kings was released posthumously in July 2007.

== Members and influence ==
In addition to the primary members noted above, several other people involved with the Canadian music scene have played with Daddy's Hands. Dan Boeckner of Wolf Parade stated in a 2010 interview that he had played with Daddy's Hands for a time. Brooke Cannon of Atlas Strategic joined the band for their 2002 lineup. The Times Colonist reported in 2013 that members of Hank and Lily had played with Daddy's Hands, although the article did not specify which members.

Some members of Daddy's Hands also played in other notable Canadian post-punk and indie rock bands. Pollard was a founding member of Atlas Strategic along with Boeckner and Cannon. Fortune and Hofmeister later played with Pink Mountaintops.
