= Plague Park =

Studio album by Handsome Furs
- Released: May 22, 2007
- Recorded: December 2006; Mount Zoomer: Montreal
- Genre: Indie rock
- Length: 36:31
- Label: Sub Pop

Handsome Furs chronology
Plague Park (2007)	Face Control (2009)

Plague Park is Handsome Furs' first full-length album. Handsome Furs is Dan Boeckner (Wolf Parade, Atlas Strategic) and his wife, Alexei Perry.

The record is named after the park Ruttopuisto, situated in Helsinki, Finland. Commonly referred to as "Plague Park", the park grounds sit atop a mass grave that contains the victims of the 1710 plague.

The recordings combine plaintive, angst-filled singing with loud, electronic accompaniment and heavy percussion.

== Track listing ==
All tracks are written by Dan Boeckner and Alexei Perry.

No.	Title	Length
1.	"What We Had"	3:56
2.	"Hearts of Iron"	3:35
3.	"Handsome Furs Hate This City"	4:58
4.	"Snakes on the Ladder"	4:30
5.	"Cannot Get Started"	3:00
6.	"Sing! Captain"	5:21
7.	"Dead + Rural"	3:00
8.	"Dumb Animals"	5:37
9.	"In the Radio's Hot Sun"	2:34

== Reception ==
Professional ratings
Review scores
Source	Rating
AllMusic	link
Robert Christgau	link
Drowned in Sound	(8/10) link
Pitchfork	(7.2/10) link
PopMatters	(6/10) link
Slant Magazine	link
Stylus Magazine	(B) link

Plague Park has received generally positive reviews. On the review aggregate site Metacritic, the album has a score of 72 out of 100, indicating "generally favorable reviews".

== Personnel ==
The following people contributed to Plague Park:

=== Handsome Furs ===
- Dan Boeckner
- Alexei Perry

=== Additional personnel ===
- Handsome Furs - Audio Engineer, Audio Production
- H.F. - Engineer
- Chad Jones - Audio Engineer, Audio Production, Help
- Harris Newman - Mastering
- Arlen Thompson - Audio Engineer, Audio Production, Engineer, Mixing, Producer

== Notes ==
Track nine is listed on Sub Pop's website as "The Radio's Hot Sun", but in the physical liner of the album, is listed as "In The Radio's Hot Sun".
