= A Thing Called Divine Fits =

Studio album by Divine Fits
- Released: August 27, 2012
- Recorded: March – May 2012
- Genres: Indie rock, art rock
- Length: 43:02
- Label: Merge
- Producer: Nick Launay

A Thing Called Divine Fits is the only studio album by American–Canadian indie rock band Divine Fits. The album was recorded in Los Angeles in a backyard studio with producer Nick Launay between March and May 2012. It was released on August 27, 2012 in Europe and August 28, 2012 in North America on Merge Records. The first single, "My Love Is Real", was released on July 31, 2012.

== Background ==
Britt Daniel, lead singer and guitarist of Spoon, met Dan Boeckner of Wolf Parade and Handsome Furs at a Handsome Furs concert in 2007. They kept in touch, and later, Spoon and Handsome Furs played shows together. Spoon later played Radio City Music Hall, and invited Boeckner onstage with them. Sam Brown, drummer of New Bomb Turks, was recommended by producer Mike McCarthy, who had previously worked with Daniel. Daniel had written the track "What Gets You Alone" and sent it to Boeckner in February 2011, who recorded vocals over top of it, and decided to go to California the following year, along with Sam Brown to form the band. Alex Fischel met Boeckner opening up for Handsome Furs with the band PAPA. Boeckner later got in touch with Fischel and asked him to join Divine Fits, adding keyboards to the mix. The vocals are roughly shared between Daniel and Boeckner.

== Critical reception ==
Professional ratings
Aggregate scores
Source	Rating
AnyDecentMusic?	7.7/10
Metacritic	77/100
Review scores
Source	Rating
AllMusic	4/5 stars
The A.V. Club	B+
Chicago Tribune	3/4 stars
The Guardian	4/5 stars
Mojo	4/5 stars
MSN Music (Expert Witness)	A−
Pitchfork	7.6/10
Q	3/5 stars
Rolling Stone	3.5/5 stars
Spin	7/10

A Thing Called Divine Fits was generally well received by critics, with aggregate rating site Metacritic assigning it a score of 77 out of 100 based on 30 reviews. Josh Modell of Spin described it as "something fresh from the "supergroup that they hadn't done with their respective groups before" and wrote that the band "is flirting with the coolest music 1982 had to offer," though that they have more potential than what that the album showed. Mary Chang of DIY called the album's cohesiveness "astonishing" considering that the band had only formed some months prior to its release. Other critics spoke positively of Daniel and Boeckner, noting that their songwriting fit together naturally. Rolling Stone's Jon Dolan described their partnership as a "genuine synthesis", while Harley Brown of Consequence of Sound wrote that "it might be the most fortuitous musical pairing in recent history."

A Thing Called Divine Fits was listed at number 23 on Rolling Stone's list of the top 50 albums of 2012, with the publication praising Divine Fits as "the super-group that is more than the sum of its promising parts."

== Track listing ==
No.	Title	Writer(s)	Length
1.	"My Love Is Real"	Dan Boeckner	2:49
2.	"Flaggin' a Ride"	Britt Daniel	3:47
3.	"What Gets You Alone"	Dan Boeckner, Britt Daniel	3:01
4.	"Would That Not Be Nice"	Dan Boeckner, Sam Brown, Britt Daniel	4:02
5.	"The Salton Sea"	Britt Daniel	4:21
6.	"Baby Get Worse"	Dan Boeckner	4:16
7.	"Civilian Stripes"	Dan Boeckner	2:27
8.	"For Your Heart"	Dan Boeckner	5:39
9.	"Shivers" (The Boys Next Door cover)	Rowland S. Howard	4:55
10.	"Like Ice Cream"	Britt Daniel	3:34
11.	"Neopolitans"	Britt Daniel	3:59

== Charts ==
Chart (2012)	Peak position
US Billboard 200	54
US Independent Albums (Billboard)	13
US Top Alternative Albums (Billboard)	9
US Top Rock Albums (Billboard)	15
