= Sound Kapital =

Studio album by Handsome Furs
- Released: June 28, 2011
- Studios: Hotel2Tango, Montreal, Quebec; Kaiku Studios, Helsinki
- Genre: Electropunk
- Length: 40:13
- Label: Sub Pop
- Producers: Arlen Thompson; Howard Bilerman

Handsome Furs chronology
Face Control (2009)	Sound Kapital (2011)

Sound Kapital is the third studio album by Canadian indie rock duo Handsome Furs. It was released through Sub Pop Records on June 28, 2011. According to a press release, Sound Kapital is inspired by the electronic and industrial music of 1980s Eastern Europe and it is the first album that Dan Boeckner wrote entirely on keyboards, although most songs do include guitars.

The album was named as a shortlisted nominee for the 2012 Polaris Music Prize on July 17, 2012.

== Production ==
Sound Kapital was recorded at the Handsome Furs' studio in Montreal, Canada, before being produced by Howard Bilerman and Arlen Thompson at Hotel2Tango.

== Release ==
On April 12, 2011, Handsome Furs announced they were releasing their third studio album Sound Kapital.

=== Singles ===
The first single from Sound Kapital was "What About Us", and released on April 12, 2011, the same day as the album release announcement. The track was compared to Robyn and OMD. Musician Diamond Rings remixed "What About Us" for his remix series, Remix Rainbows.

On May 20, 2011, the second track "Repatriated" was released.

=== Music videos ===
The music video for "What About Us" was released on July 8, 2011, and was directed by Scott Coffey.

== Tour ==
In support of the album, Handsome Furs went on a tour of North American and Europe, starting on April 14, 2011, at The Bell House in Brooklyn, New York, and finished on May 22, 2011, at the Konsertforeningen Betong venue in Oslo, Norway. The duo announced more tours on May 20, 2011, for Canada and midwest United States, making appearances at North by Northeast, 80/35 Music Festival and Capitol Hill Block Party.

== Critical reception ==
Professional ratings
Aggregate scores
Source	Rating
AnyDecentMusic?	7.2/10
Metacritic	75/100
Review scores
Source	Rating
AllMusic	3/5 stars
The A.V. Club	B−
Beats Per Minute	67%
Consequence of Sound	B
DIY	4.5/5 stars
Drowned in Sound	7/10
NME	3/5 stars
Now	4/5 Ns
Paste	7.5/10
Pitchfork	8.1/10

Sound Kapital was met with "generally favorable" reviews from critics. At Metacritic, which assigns a weighted average rating out of 100 to reviews from mainstream publications, this release received an average score of 75 based on 19 reviews. Aggregate website AnyDecentMusic? gave the release a 7.2 out of 10 based on a critical consensus of 12 reviews.

In a review for AllMusic, critic reviewer Jason Lymangrover wrote: "Sound Kapital was inspired by the last two years of traveling Asia. Aspects of J-pop and K-pop seem to have permeated their mindset, since, as an electronic duo, everything is light, peppy, straight-ahead, and modern-sounding, often to the point of sounding inhuman." At The A.V. Club, Steven Hyden explained: "Sound Kapital consists mainly of catchy, mid-tempo rock songs where majestic guitar solos and atmospheric keyboard swishes swoop in from mid-'80s U2 and Tears For Fears records." Harley Brown of Consequence of Sound reviewed the album: "Sound Kapital exemplifies form mirroring content and vice versa. The electro-industrial synthesizers and drum machines convey the Handsome Furs' lyrical convictions better than the band's earlier, less bombastic combinations of synths and guitar. Boeckner's tenuous voice sounds at home bouncing off Perry's grungy beats, and the two unleash their potential behind the keyboards." At Drowned in Sound, Neil Ashman described the album as "a successful, if slightly creatively stifling refinement of a fruitful and unique musical partnership."

Writing for Rolling Stone, writer Doree Shafrir wrote: "Boeckner and his wife Alexei Perry's danceable electronic-pop sound belies the album's often melancholy themes of love, self-discovery and rebirth. Sweaty and urgent, Sound Kapital is a snapshot of a dark world with hard-fought glimmers of euphoria."

== Track listing ==
Sound Kapital track listing
No.	Title	Length
1.	"When I Get Back"	4:42
2.	"Damage"	3:18
3.	"Bury Me Standing"	4:05
4.	"Memories of the Future"	3:45
5.	"Serve the People"	4:06
6.	"What About Us"	5:16
7.	"Repatriated"	4:48
8.	"Cheap Music"	3:04
9.	"No Feelings"	7:00

iTunes bonus track
No.	Title	Length
10.	"Agony"	4:50

== Personnel ==
Musicians

- Dan Boeckner – vocals
- Alexei Perry – keyboard
- Radwan Ghazi Moumneh – vocals

Production

- Howard Bilerman – producer, engineer
- Arlen Thompson – producer, engineer
- Harris Newman – mastering
- Antti Joas – mixing
- Jonas Verwijnen – mixing
