= Face Control =

Studio album by Handsome Furs
- Released: March 10, 2009
- Recorded: 2007–2009
- Genre: Electropunk
- Length: 38:27
- Label: Sub Pop

Handsome Furs chronology
| Plague Park (2007) | Face Control (2009) | Sound Kapital (2011) |

Face Control is Handsome Furs' second full-length album, which was released through Sub Pop Records. The album was recorded and mixed by Wolf Parade's Arlen Thompson at Mount Zoomer, and it was mastered by Harris Newman at Hotel2Tango.

The album's title takes its name from the face control policy seen in upscale Russian nightclubs where people are admitted based on physical attractiveness.

== Background and Release ==
The album was heavily influenced by the Handsome Furs' travels through Eastern Europe. Dan Boeckner has referred to the album as a "travel diary". In choosing the album's title, Boeckner said:

The thing that really attracted me to using that as an album title was that it was a perfect example of how post-Communist Russia had so embraced this crazed form of hyper-capitalism — the kind that has no regard whatsoever for human-beings — to an extent that would horrify even the most right-wing North American Republican capitalist.

Face Control was originally set to be released on February 3, 2009. However, the album's release dated was delayed until March 10, 2009, due to a legal issue. According to the official Wolf Parade fansite, the Handsome Furs referenced a New Order song on the track "All We Want, Baby, Is Everything". In order to use the reference, the band needed to legally clear it with New Order, which took some time to do and caused the release to be pushed back.

== Reception ==
Professional ratings
Review scores
| Source | Rating |
|---|---|
| AllMusic | link |
| The A.V. Club | (D) link |
| Drowned in Sound | (8/10) |
| Pitchfork | (8.0/10) link |
| PopMatters | (7/10) link |
| Rolling Stone | link at the Wayback Machine (archived April 10, 2009) |
| Spin Magazine | (8/10) link |

Face Control has received generally positive reviews. On the review aggregate site Metacritic, the album has a score of 68 out of 100, indicating "generally favorable reviews".

Pitchfork's Paul Thompson praised the album, writing "On every conceivable level down to the cover art, Face Control bests its predecessor, adding stuttering nuance to their previously too-spare sound, which they drape over some of the finest songs Boeckner's ever written." Drowned in Sound's Alexander Tudor compared the album to Bruce Springsteen's Born in the U.S.A., writing "Yeah, it's THAT good..." Margaret Reges of AllMusic called Face Control "...a solid album, and just another example of Boeckner and Perry's tingling creative chemistry."

Matthew Cole of Slant Magazine gave the album a mixed review, writing "Fans of off-kilter pop will enjoy at least a few of the stronger cuts, but too much of Face Control sounds like the unfinished blueprint of a much better album." In a scathing review, The A.V. Club's Chris Martins wrote "Everything about these songs feels lazy, from the sludgy rock and tinsel-thin beats of 'Evangeline' to the couple's weak approximation of The Knife on '(White City)' to the half-assed 'Dancing In The Dark' paean at the end of 'Legal Tender.'" Martins concluded: "This is easily the most flavorless fruit yet to fall from the Wolf Parade family tree."

Spinner named Face Control the best Canadian album of 2009. The album was nominated for the Juno Award for Alternative Album of the Year in the 2010 Juno Awards, where it lost to Metric's Fantasies. In addition, Face Control was one of the long list nominees for the 2009 Polaris Music Prize.

== Track listing ==
All tracks are written by Handsome Furs.

| No. | Title | Length |
|---|---|---|
| 1. | "Legal Tender" | 2:50 |
| 2. | "Evangeline" | 3:40 |
| 3. | "Talking Hotel Arbat Blues" | 2:40 |
| 4. | "(Passport Kontrol)" | 1:24 |
| 5. | "All We Want, Baby, Is Everything" | 3:08 |
| 6. | "I'm Confused" | 3:35 |
| 7. | "(White City)" | 1:27 |
| 8. | "Nyet Spasiba" | 4:18 |
| 9. | "Officer of Hearts" | 5:44 |
| 10. | "(It's Not Me, It's You)" | 1:33 |
| 11. | "Thy Will Be Done" | 3:16 |
| 12. | "Radio Kaliningrad" | 4:52 |

== Personnel ==
The following people contributed to Face Control:

=== Handsome Furs ===
- Dan Boeckner
- Alexei Perry

=== Additional personnel ===
- Jouko Lehtola - Artwork
- Harris Newman - Mastering, Remastering
- Dusty Summers - Art Direction
- Arlen Thompson - Audio Engineer, Engineer, Mixing

== Charts ==
| Chart (2009) | Peak position |
|---|---|
| US Billboard Independent Albums | 44 |
| US Billboard Heatseekers | 16 |

== Videos ==
- "Legal Tender" - Radio K in-studio performance.
- "Thy Will Be Done" - Radio K in-studio performance.
- "I'm Confused" - Directed by Scott Coffey.
