= Julia with Blue Jeans On =

Studio album by Moonface
- Released: October 29, 2013
- Recorded: 2012–2013
- Genre: Indie rock
- Label: Jagjaguwar
- Producer: Spencer Krug

Moonface chronology
| With Siinai: Heartbreaking Bravery (2012) | Julia with Blue Jeans On (2013) | City Wrecker EP (2014) |

Julia with Blue Jeans On is the third album by musician Spencer Krug under the alias Moonface. It is the follow-up to 2012's With Siinai: Heartbreaking Bravery and features only Krug on vocals and piano. The album was released on 29 October 2013 by Jagjaguwar in the United States and by Paper Bag Records in Canada.

The album was a longlisted nominee for the 2014 Polaris Music Prize.

== Track listing ==
1. "Barbarian"
2. "Everyone Is Noah, Everyone Is the Ark"
3. "Barbarian II"
4. "November, 2011"
5. "Dreamy Summer"
6. "Julia with Blue Jeans On"
7. "Love the House You're In"
8. "First Violin"
9. "Black Is Back in Style"
10. "Your Chariot Awaits"
