= Atlas Strategic =

Canadian indie rock band

- (from left): Steve Simard, Johnny Pollard (aka Atlas Strategic), Dan Boeckner, Jeffrey Allport.

Background information
- Origin: Victoria, British Columbia, Canada
- Genres: Indie rock
- Years active: 2000–2002
- Labels: Global Symphonic
- Members: Johnny Pollard; Dan Boeckner; Steve Simard; Jeff Allport; Brooklyn Cannon; Scott Henderson

Atlas Strategic was an indie rock band from Victoria, British Columbia, Canada.

== History ==
The band was composed of Dan Boeckner on guitar and vocals; Johnny Pollard (aka Atlas Strategic) on organ, synthesizer, saxophone, and backing vocals; Steve Simard on drums; and Brooklyn Cannon on guitar and backing vocals.

Their first album (the only official release), Rapture, Ye Minions!, was released on Global Symphonic Records on February 14, 2001. While touring, the band recorded a second session and put out the 8-song tour EP, That's Familiar!, which was only distributed at shows. The band had another unofficial release called Here We Come that included the songs from That's Familiar! and three more, including a new version of Bad Robots from Rapture, Ye Minions!

After recording That's Familiar! and Here We Come, Brooklyn Cannon left the band. This caused Steve Simard to move from drums to guitar, and Jeffrey Allport was brought in as a replacement drummer.

Scott Henderson of Sea Of Shit Studios recorded both albums. The band used much of his equipment, and he played a vital role in the sound and whole recording process. He also played with the band, playing guitar for many shows due to Dan's inability to play due to an injury.

Atlas Strategic later had plans to put out their next release, Ghetto Purchase, on a larger label. It was rumored that an album deal with Sub Pop Records was in the works, however the band broke up in 2002 before any deals were made.

Dan Boeckner joined Wolf Parade. He was also in the duo The Handsome Furs with wife, Alexei Perry before forming Divine Fits and Operators. Brooklyn Cannon moved to Montreal and joined the band Total Bummer. Johnny Pollard played with Daddy's Hands, then moved to The Lords Of Discipline. Steve Simard moved to the Yukon.

== Discography ==
=== Albums ===
- Rapture, Ye Minions! (2001) - Global Symphonic Records

=== EPs ===
- That's Familiar! (2002) - Self-released

== See also ==
- Canadian rock
- List of Canadian musicians
- List of bands from Canada
- List of bands from British Columbia
- Category:Canadian musical groups
