= Spencer Krug =

Canadian musician (born 1977)

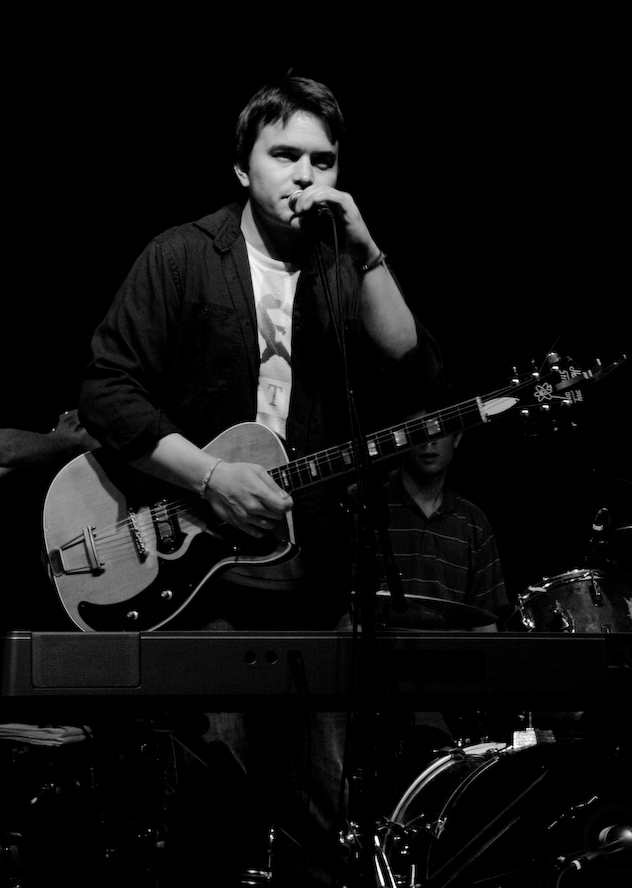
- Spencer Krug performing in 2009 with Sunset Rubdown.

Background information
- Born: May 4, 1977 (age 49); Penticton, British Columbia, Canada
- Genre: Indie rock
- Occupation: Musician
- Instruments: Vocals, piano, keyboards, guitar, accordion, kick drum
- Years active: 2002–present
- Labels: Sub Pop, Absolutely Kosher, Global Symphonic, Jagjaguwar, DSA, Paper Bag Records

Spencer Krug (/ˈkruːɡ/ KROOG) (born May 4, 1977) is a Canadian musician. He is the singer, songwriter and keyboardist for the indie rock band Wolf Parade and has recorded solo under both his own name and the name Moonface. He has also performed with other Canadian bands including Sunset Rubdown, Swan Lake, Frog Eyes, Fifths of Seven, and ska band the Two Tonne Bowlers, playing various instruments. His involvement in many musical acts has garnered him a noticeably high output of work, being credited on several releases a year. He is known for his distinctive voice and songwriting abilities.

== Overview ==
Krug was born on May 4, 1977, and raised in Penticton, British Columbia, where at age 12, he first began playing piano. Soon after, he picked up guitar, focusing on the two instruments. Upon leaving Penticton, he moved to Victoria, British Columbia, where he helped found the indie rock band Frog Eyes with his then-roommate, Carey Mercer. Krug took part in a March 2001 recording session that would later become Frog Eyes' first LP, The Bloody Hand. Shortly afterwards, however, Krug left the band and moved to Montreal where he studied creative writing and musical composition at Concordia University. In April 2003, Krug formed Wolf Parade alongside fellow singer-songwriter/guitarist Dan Boeckner.

Wolf Parade's first show was opening for Arcade Fire on the 2003 "Us Kids Know" tour. Apologies to the Queen Mary, Wolf Parade's debut album, was produced by Modest Mouse frontman Isaac Brock and released on Seattle indie label Sub Pop on September 27, 2005.

Also in 2005, Krug teamed up with Beckie Foon (A Silver Mt. Zion, Saltland, Set Fire to Flames, Esmerine) and Rachel Levine (Cakelk), forming the instrumental string/piano/accordion-based trio Fifths of Seven. Later that year, the band released Spry from Bitter Anise Folds.

As a side project to Wolf Parade, under the moniker Sunset Rubdown, Krug self-produced five EPs, each one focusing on specific thematic composition and instrumentation–acoustic guitar; piano and hand claps; synths and drum machines, etc.–of original songs. A handful of the songs from those EPs have been released on Spencer's Patreon. In the mid-2005 selections from each of those EPs were compiled and released as the LP, Snake's Got a Leg. Originally a solo project, Sunset Rubdown expanded in the late 2005 and early 2006 to include Camilla Wynn Ingr (Pony Up!), Jordan Robson-Cramer (XY Lover, Magic Weapon, and Miracle Fortress) and Michael Doerksen. This new line-up released its first collaborative efforts: a 5 track self-titled EP, Sunset Rubdown, in January 2006, followed by the band's second LP, Shut Up I Am Dreaming, in May 2006. Sunset Rubdown's third LP, Random Spirit Lover, was released October 2007 on Jagjaguwar Records. Sunset Rubdown's fourth LP, Dragonslayer, was released in 2009 on Jagjaguwar Records.

Krug rejoined Frog Eyes as their keyboardist in early 2006 and helped put out The Future Is Inter-Disciplinary or Not at All and Tears of the Valedictorian. Wolf Parade and Frog Eyes toured that year together, allowing Krug to participate in both bands simultaneously. Krug also recorded material for the indie rock supergroup Swan Lake alongside Frog Eyes' Carey Mercer and Destroyer's Dan Bejar. The group released their debut album, Beast Moans, on November 21, 2006, through Jagjaguwar.

In mid-2008, Krug toured with Wolf Parade in support of their second LP entitled At Mount Zoomer on June 17, 2008. On March 24, 2009, Swan Lake released their second album, Enemy Mine. In January 2010, Krug released Dreamland EP: Marimba and Shit-Drums under the Moonface name. In June 2010, Wolf Parade released their third full album, Expo 86. A world tour supporting the new album followed, after which the band went on indefinite hiatus.

Krug's first full-length album as Moonface, Organ Music Not Vibraphone Like I'd Hoped, was released in August 2011. Influences on the record included Suicide, OMD and Depeche Mode. Krug then teamed up with the Helsinki-based band Siinai to record his second full length Moonface album, With Siinai: Heartbreaking Bravery, which was released on April 17, 2012. In a June 2012 interview, Krug stated that Wolf Parade and Sunset Rubdown had disbanded and would no longer be touring or releasing albums. On August 27, 2013, Jagjaguwar Records announced Krug's third full length Moonface album, Julia With Blue Jeans On, which was released on October 29, 2013. Krug once again collaborated with Siinai for the fourth Moonface album, My Best Human Face, which was released on June 3, 2016.

Wolf Parade reunited in 2016, releasing a self-titled EP that May. The band's fourth album, Cry Cry Cry, followed on October 6, 2017. Krug's fifth full-length release as Moonface, a double album entitled This One's for the Dancer & This One's for the Dancer's Bouquet, was released on November 2, 2018, after which Krug retired the Moonface alias, citing a desire "to get personally behind [his work] in a more literal and meaningful way" by releasing music under his own name. Wolf Parade's fifth album, Thin Mind, was released on January 24, 2020; however, the album's accompanying tour was cut short by the onset of the COVID-19 pandemic.

Krug's first album under his own name, Fading Graffiti, was announced in March 2021 and released the following month. It served as the first release on Krug's personal record label, Pronounced Kroog. His two subsequent solo albums, Twenty Twenty Twenty Twenty One and I Just Drew This Knife, followed in June 2022 and October 2023, respectively.

After a 13-year hiatus, Sunset Rubdown announced their reunion in December 2022, and embarked on a North American tour in the spring of 2023. On February 4, 2024, the group announced via Instagram that they had recorded a new album. Called Always Happy to Explode, the nine-song album released on September 20, 2024.

In late 2025, the Krug-penned Wolf Parade song "I'll Believe in Anything" saw a boost in popularity due to its inclusion the same-titled episode of the Crave show Heated Rivalry. It was reported that Spotify streams of the song had increased 3,000%. In March the following year, Krug announced a new solo album titled Same Fangs, scheduled for a May 15 release.

== Personal life ==
Krug lived in Helsinki from 2012 to 2014. After moving back to Vancouver Island, he settled in the Cowichan Valley, initially in Cobble Hill and later in Cowichan Station. He and his wife had their first child, a son, in April 2020.

== Discography ==
=== Fifths of Seven ===
- Spry from Bitter Anise Folds (2005, DSA)

=== Frog Eyes ===
- The Bloody Hand (2002, Global Symphonic)
- Emboldened Navigator EP (2003, Soft Abuse)
- The Future Is Inter-Disciplinary or Not at All (2006, Acuarela Discos)
- Tears of the Valedictorian (2007, Absolutely Kosher)

=== Sunset Rubdown ===
- Snake's Got a Leg (2005) Global Symphonic
- Sunset Rubdown EP (2006, Global Symphonic)
- Shut Up I Am Dreaming (2006, Absolutely Kosher)
- Random Spirit Lover (2007, Jagjaguwar)
- Introducing Moonface (2009, Global Symphonic)
- Dragonslayer (2009, Jagjaguwar)
- Always Happy to Explode (2024, Pronounced Kroog)

=== Swan Lake ===
- Beast Moans (2006, Jagjaguwar)
- Enemy Mine (2009, Jagjaguwar)

=== Wolf Parade ===
- Wolf Parade (4-song EP) (2003, self-released)
- Wolf Parade (6-song EP) (2004, self-released)
- Wolf Parade EP (2005, Sub Pop)
- Apologies to the Queen Mary (2005, reissued 2016, Sub Pop)
- At Mount Zoomer (2008, Sub Pop)
- Expo 86 (2010, Sub Pop)
- EP 4 (2016, self-released)
- Cry Cry Cry (2017, Sub Pop)
- Thin Mind (2020, Sub Pop)

=== Moonface ===
- Dreamland EP: Marimba and Shit-Drums (2010, Jagjaguwar)
- Organ Music Not Vibraphone Like I'd Hoped (2011, Jagjaguwar)
- Heartbreaking Bravery (with Siinai) (2012, Jagjaguwar)
- Julia With Blue Jeans On (2013, Jagjaguwar/Paper Bag Records)
- City Wrecker EP (2014, Jagjaguwar/Paper Bag Records)
- My Best Human Face (with Siinai) (2016, Jagjaguwar/Paper Bag Records)
- This One's for the Dancer & This One's for the Dancer's Bouquet (2018, Jagjaguwar)
- The Minotaur Instrumentals (2022, Pronounced Kroog)

=== Solo albums ===
- Fading Graffiti (2021, Pronounced Kroog)
- Twenty Twenty Twenty Twenty One (2022, Pronounced Kroog)
- I Just Drew This Knife (2023, Pronounced Kroog)
- 20202021 Solo Piano (2024, Pronounced Kroog)
- Solo Rhodes (2025, Pronounced Kroog)
- Same Fangs (2026, Pronounced Kroog)

== Notable contributions ==
- In 2005, Krug contributed to the UNICEF benefit song, "Do They Know It's Hallowe'en?" along with Dan Boeckner.
- In 2006, Krug contributed piano and synthesizer to Islands' first album, "Return to the Sea"
- He appears as a collaborating musician on "Certain Father", a track from July Talk's 2023 album Remember Never Before.
