= Sunset Rubdown Introducing Moonface =

EP by Sunset Rubdown
- Released: April 2009
- Recorded: 2008
- Genre: Indie rock
- Label: Global Symphonic

Sunset Rubdown chronology
Random Spirit Lover (2007)	Sunset Rubdown Introducing Moonface (2009)	Dragonslayer (2009)

Sunset Rubdown Introducing Moonface is a two-song EP by Sunset Rubdown, which was released in April 2009. The two-song "picture disc" was recorded at Spencer Krug's house and mixed by Arlen Thompson and Krug at Breakglass Studio.

== Track listing ==
1. "Coming to at Dawn" - 4:08
2. "Insane Love Is Awakening" - 3:30
