= Expo 86 (disambiguation) =

Expo 86 was a World's Fair held in Vancouver, British Columbia, Canada in 1986.

Expo 86 may also refer to:

- Expo 86 (album), 2010 album by Wolf Parade
- "Expo 86," a song by Death Cab for Cutie from their 2003 album Transatlanticism
