= With Siinai: Heartbreaking Bravery =

Studio album by Moonface and Siinai
- Released: April 17, 2012
- Recorded: Fall 2011–winter 2012
- Genre: Indie rock
- Length: 46:07
- Label: Jagjaguwar
- Producers: Jonas Verwijnen, Antti Joas, Spencer Krug and Siinai

Professional ratings
Aggregate scores
Source	Rating
Metacritic	78/100
Review scores
Source	Rating
Consequence of Sound	C+
NME	3/5 stars
Pitchfork	7.1/10
PopMatters	9/10

With Siinai: Heartbreaking Bravery is the second full-length album released by musician Spencer Krug under the Moonface name. It is the follow-up to the 2011 album Organ Music Not Vibraphone Like I'd Hoped and was released on April 17, 2012. The album is a result of the collaboration of Krug with the Finnish rock band Siinai. Krug met the band Joensuu 1685 while on tour with another of his bands, Wolf Parade, in 2009. Joensuu 1685 later became Siinai, and when they indicated to Krug that they were in need of a vocalist the project that would later become Heartbreaking Bravery was born.

The album was released on April 17, 2012, on vinyl, CD and for digital distribution, although it was made available for download early if pre-ordered through Jagjaguwar's website on March 26, 2012.

== Track listing ==
All songs written by Spencer Krug and Siinai.

1. "Heartbreaking Bravery" - 5:38
2. "Yesterday's Fire" - 5:05
3. "Shitty City" - 3:59
4. "Quickfire, I Tried" - 5:51
5. "I'm Not the Phoenix Yet" - 2:44
6. "10,000 Scorpions" - 2:10
7. "Faraway Lightning" - 4:45
8. "Headed For the Door" - 7:38
9. "Teary Eyes and Bloody Lips" - 2:45
10. "Lay Your Cheek On Down" - 5:37
