= Open Your Heart or Die Trying =

2026 studio album by Arcade Fire

- Original cover art

Studio album by Arcade Fire
- Released: April 18, 2026
- Genres: Ambient, drone
- Length: 36:04
- Producers: Win Butler; Régine Chassagne; Gerardo "Jerry" Ordonez

Arcade Fire chronology
Pink Elephant (2025)	Open Your Heart or Die Trying (2026)

Open Your Heart or Die Trying is an ambient studio album by Canadian indie rock band Arcade Fire, released on April 18, 2026. The album is a companion piece to the band's 2025 release Pink Elephant, reinterpreting the tracks as experimental ambient music.

The album was released as an exclusive for Record Store Day, and followed with a digital release on May 1, 2026.

== Background ==
On May 9, 2025, Arcade Fire released Pink Elephant, their first album since 2022, following a period of public scrutiny and misconduct allegations against Butler. The album was met with mixed reviews and failed to chart on the Billboard 200 in the United States. In September 2025, Butler and Chassagne separated after more than 20 years of marriage. Open your Heart or Die Trying was released several months later in April 2026.

Open your Heart or Die Trying is considered a companion album to Pink Elephant, released during a period of Arcade Fire that is regarded as "complicated" and creatively divisive. It is a "cinematic" ambient reinterpretation of Pink Elephant. The Facebook account for Arcade Fire described the release as a "sonic landscape, a score to a film that hasn’t been made yet".

== Track listing ==
All tracks are written by Win Butler and Régine Chassagne.

No.	Title	Length
1.	"Open Your Heart or Die Trying (Director's Cut)"	8:41
2.	"Pink Elephant's Dream"	5:28
3.	"Season of Change"	2:58
4.	"Trust Fall"	2:51
5.	"The Machine is Broken"	3:20
6.	"Mountains are Moving"	1:59
7.	"Breaking into Heaven"	4:21
8.	"Quit Your Job Meditation"	6:26
Total length:		36:04
