= Dragonslayer (Sunset Rubdown album) =

Studio album by Sunset Rubdown
- Released: June 23, 2009
- Recorded: October 2008
- Genre: Indie rock
- Length: 48:43
- Label: Jagjaguwar

Sunset Rubdown chronology
Sunset Rubdown Introducing Moonface (2009)	Dragonslayer (2009)	Always Happy to Explode (2024)

Professional ratings
Aggregate scores
Source	Rating
Metacritic	81/100
Review scores
Source	Rating
AllMusic	4/5 stars
The A.V. Club	A
Clash	8/10
Drowned In Sound	10/10
Now	4/5 stars
Pitchfork	8.3/10
Planet Sound	8/10
PopMatters	9/10
Rolling Stone	3.5/5 stars
Spin	4/5 stars

Dragonslayer is the fourth studio album recorded by the Canadian indie band Sunset Rubdown. It is the second of their albums to be recorded under the Jagjaguwar recording label. It was released June 23, 2009. The album was made available for MP3 download with preorder on May 20, 2009. The track "Paper Lace" had previously appeared on Enemy Mine by one of Spencer Krug's other bands Swan Lake.

== Track listing ==
1. "Silver Moons" – 4:45
2. "Idiot Heart" – 6:09
3. "Apollo and the Buffalo and Anna Anna Anna Oh!" – 5:23
4. "Black Swan" – 6:54
5. "Paper Lace" – 3:48
6. "You Go On Ahead (Trumpet Trumpet II)" – 5:43
7. "Nightingale/December Song" – 5:34
8. "Dragon's Lair" – 10:28

== Personnel ==
- Spencer Krug – vocals, keyboards, guitar
- Camilla Wynne Ingr – percussion, keyboards, vocals
- Michael Doerksen – guitar, bass, synthesizers, drums, vocals
- Mark Nicol – bass, kalimba
- Jordan Robson-Cramer – drums, guitar, keyboards
