= Johnny and the Moon =

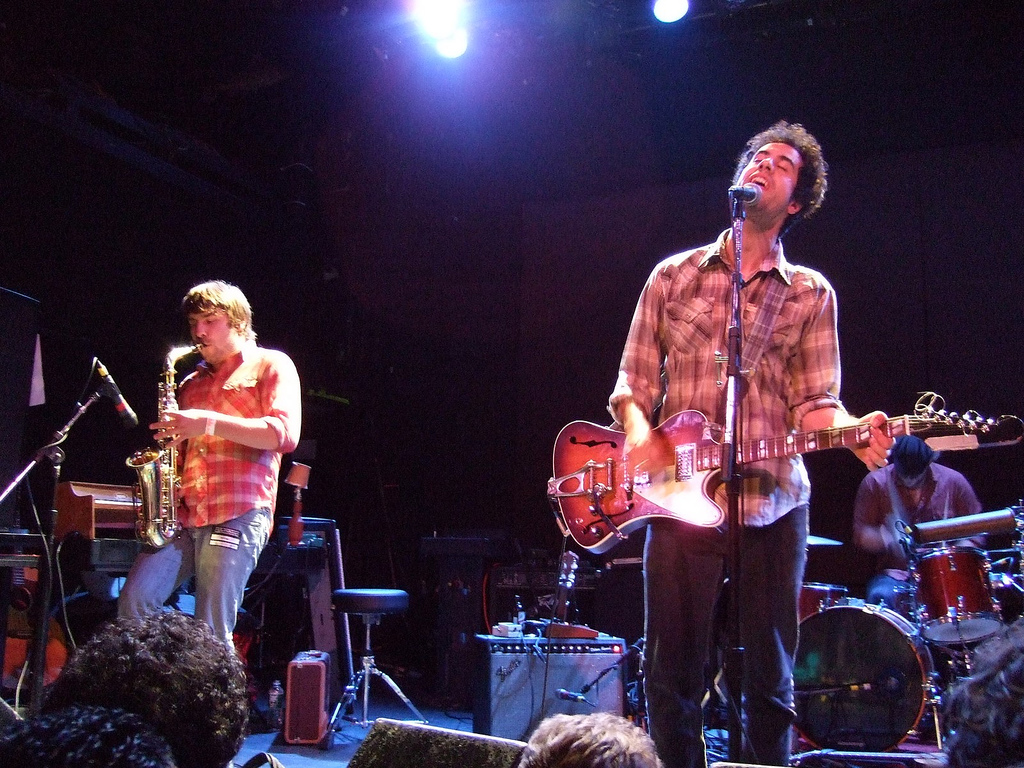
- Johnny and the Moon at Bowery Ballroom on October 9, 2007 (from left Big Juicy Papa, Dante DeCaro, Lindy Gerrard).

Background information
- Origin: Shawnigan Lake, British Columbia, Canada
- Genres: Folk rock, indie rock
- Years active: 2006–present
- Labels: Kill Devil Hills
- Members: Dante DeCaro; Lindy Gerrard; Mark Devoe; Jeff "Big Juicy Papa" Phillips
- Website: killdevilhillsrecords.com

Johnny and the Moon is a Canadian indie rock band based in Shawnigan Lake, British Columbia. The band is fronted by Dante DeCaro of Hot Hot Heat and Wolf Parade and also includes Lindy Gerrard, Mark Devoe, and Jeff "Big Juicy Papa" Phillips.

== History ==
Johnny and the Moon was formed in 2006. The band's name is a play on the 1959 band Johnny and the Moondogs, the precursor to Beatles.

The band released its self-titled debut album in 2006 on British Columbia, Canada based label Kill Devil Hills Records.

The band continued to perform on the west coast and in northern Canada for several years after the album's release, including an appearance at the Dawson City Music Festival in 2010. Reviews of their live shows were mixed.

== Members ==
=== Current ===
- Dante DeCaro: Vocals, guitar, banjo (2006–present)
- Mark Devoe: Bass, Keyboards (2006–present)
- Lindy Gerrard: Percussion (2006–present)
- Jeff "Big Juicy Papa" Phillips: Saxophone (2006–present)

== Discography ==
- Johnny and the Moon (2006)

== See also ==
- Music of Canada
- Canadian rock
- List of Canadian musicians
- List of bands from Canada
- List of bands from British Columbia
