= Dan Boeckner =

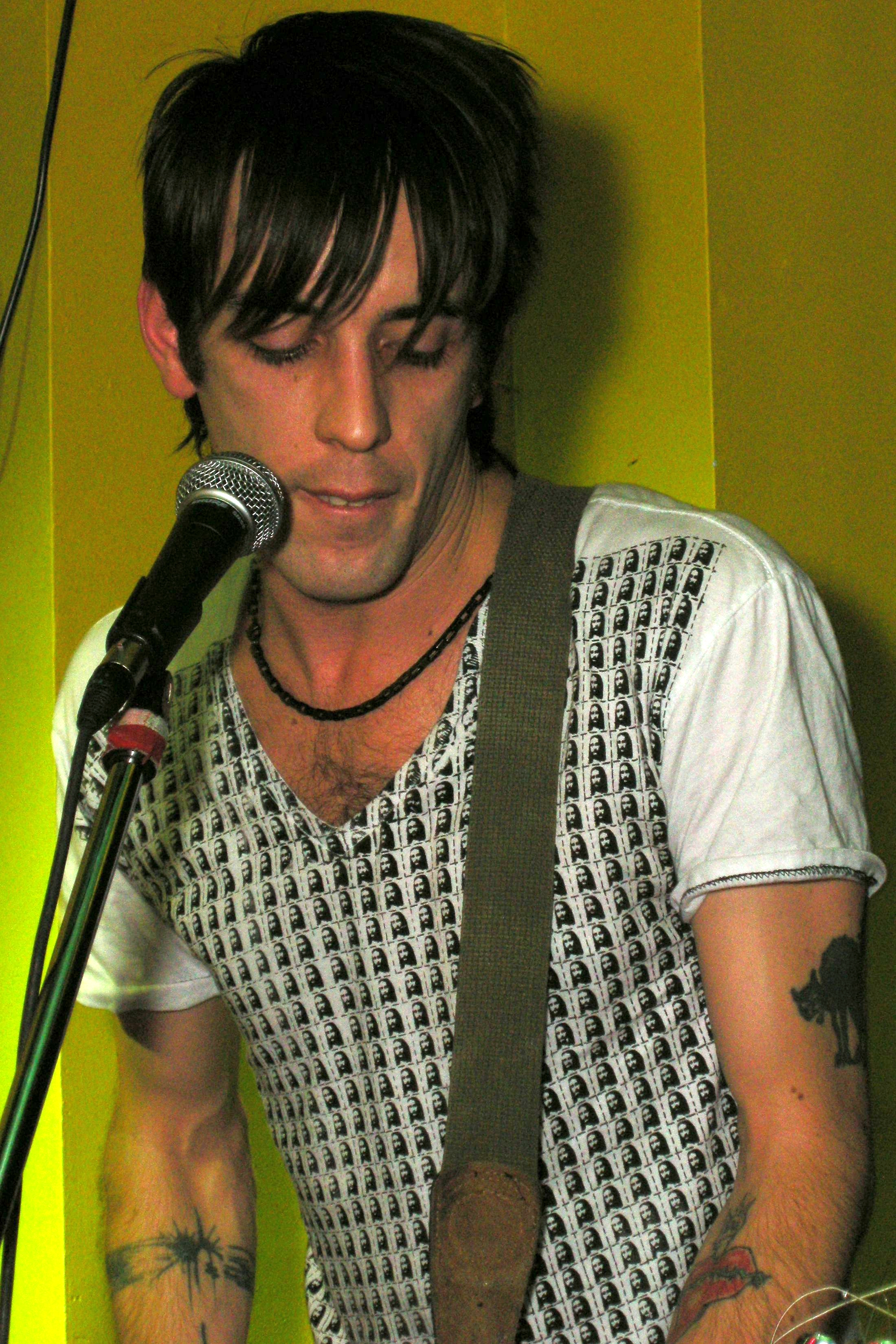
- Dan Boeckner in 2007

Background information
- Born: 5 February 1978 (age 48)
- Origin: Lake Cowichan, British Columbia, Canada
- Genre: Indie rock
- Years active: 2000–present
- Labels: Sub Pop, Last Gang Records, Global Symphonic, Merge Records
- Formerly of: Wolf Parade, Atlas Strategic, Handsome Furs, Divine Fits, Operators, Arcade Fire

Dan Boeckner (/ˈbɛknər/; born 5 February 1978) is a Canadian singer, songwriter, guitarist and podcaster. He is best known as one of the frontmen of Wolf Parade, which he helped found in 2003. Since 2013, he has also been a member of the Montreal-based band Operators. Boeckner began his career in the Victoria, Canada music scene, playing in multiple bands including Atlas Strategic. Since that time, he has been part of projects including Handsome Furs and Divine Fits with Spoon frontman Britt Daniel.

In 2022, Boeckner joined Arcade Fire in a session capacity, touring and performing with the band in support of their sixth studio album, WE. Making his live debut at the Toulouse Theatre in New Orleans, Boeckner subsequently appeared in the video to the band's twenty-fourth single, "The Lightning I, II" and contributed to the recording process for the band's seventh studio album, Pink Elephant (2025). Prior to this, Dan had briefly been a touring member of the band in 2003.

== Overview ==
Boeckner grew up in Lake Cowichan, British Columbia and his first band was called Say Uncle. Immediately upon graduating high school, he moved to Victoria, British Columbia. In Victoria he became a singer/guitarist for many small, independent outfits. One of these bands was named God Shaped Vacuum, and featured a pre-Frog Eyes Carey Mercer on drums. They released one album in their brief existence, entitled Apocalypse Now! In 2000, Boeckner co-founded notable British Columbian band Atlas Strategic with organist/vocalist John Pollard, and recorded their debut Rapture, Ye Minions!. The album was released on a local label, Global Symphonic. The band toured and recorded a second album/EP, which they self-released upon their demise in 2002.

Boeckner then moved to Montreal, Quebec, where he eventually met with Spencer Krug and helped form Wolf Parade. Boeckner contributes his guitar skills, while also splitting songwriting duties and the role of lead singer with band-mate Krug. The band is signed to Sub Pop Records. In November 2010, Wolf Parade announced that they were taking an "indefinite hiatus".

Boeckner formed the Handsome Furs with his then fiancée Alexei Perry, in the winter of 2005. The duo signed to Sub Pop Records and released their debut album Plague Park in 2007. Face Control was released in 2009, while Handsome Furs' latest album Sound Kapital was released in 2011. On 17 May 2012, Handsome Furs announced the band was no more on their official website. Later, it was confirmed that the couple had broken up.

In October 2005, Boeckner was a part of the satirical North American Hallowe'en Prevention Initiative (NAHPI) and contributed to the UNICEF benefit song "Do They Know It's Hallowe'en?". Boeckner also played on Islands' debut album Return to the Sea. He played guitar on the opening track "Swans (Life After Death)" and he played in the "marching band" on the track "Where There's a Will There's a Whalebone".

After the breakup of Handsome Furs, Boeckner formed Divine Fits with Britt Daniel in 2011 while Daniel was on break from his band Spoon. The band released one studio album, A Thing Called Divine Fits, in 2012 to positive reviews and one live album, Live at Third Man Records, in 2014.

In May 2014, Boeckner debuted his new band, Operators, during Canadian Music Week in Toronto. In January 2016, the Operators announced that their debut album, Blue Wave, would be released on 1 April 2016.

In January 2016, Wolf Parade announced on their website that their hiatus was over, and that they would be returning to the stage with a series of live shows starting in May 2016. In May 2016, Wolf Parade released a self titled EP.

Since 2021, Boeckner has co-hosted the podcast The Bottlemen with Riley Quinn. The podcast focuses primarily on Canadian politics from a left-wing perspective and is broadly a part of the so-called Dirtbag left, featuring frequent guest appearances from figures associated with that scene.

== Discography ==
=== Atlas Strategic ===
- Rapture, Ye Minions! (2000) Global Symphonic
- That's Familiar! (2002) Self-released

=== Wolf Parade ===
- Wolf Parade (4-song EP) (2003) Self-Released
- Wolf Parade (6-song EP) (2004) Self-Released
- Wolf Parade (EP) (2005) Sub Pop
- Apologies to the Queen Mary (2005) Sub Pop
- At Mount Zoomer (2008) Sub Pop
- Expo 86 (2010) Sub Pop
- Wolf Parade (EP) (2016) Self-Released
- Cry Cry Cry (2017) Sub Pop
- Thin Mind (2020) Sub Pop

=== Handsome Furs ===
- Plague Park (2007) Sub Pop
- Face Control (2009) Sub Pop
- Sound Kapital (2011) Sub Pop

=== Divine Fits ===
- A Thing Called Divine Fits (2012) Merge Records

=== Operators ===
- EP 1 (2014) Last Gang Records
- Blue Wave (2016) Last Gang Records
- Radiant Dawn (2019) Last Gang Records

=== Boeckner ===
- Boeckner! (2024) Sub Pop Records
