= Thin Mind =

Studio album by Wolf Parade
- Released: January 24, 2020
- Studio: Risque Disque Records, in Ladysmith, British Columbia, Canada
- Genre: Indie rock
- Length: 42:39
- Label: Sub Pop
- Producer: John Goodmanson

Wolf Parade chronology
Cry Cry Cry (2017)	Thin Mind (2020)

Thin Mind is the fifth studio album by Canadian indie rock band Wolf Parade, released on January 24, 2020 on Sub Pop. Produced by John Goodmanson, who had worked with the band on their previous studio album, Cry Cry Cry (2017), the album is the band's first to be recorded as a trio, following multi-instrumentalist Dante DeCaro's departure the previous year.

== Background ==
Thin Mind is Wolf Parade's fifth studio album and their first to be released since the departure of longtime guitarist and bassist Dante DeCaro. Keyboardist Spencer Krug said that the album title refers to "... the way that being around too much tech has made our focus thin." On the album, Wolf Parade address the difficulty of managing the constant barrage of content from news and social media.

== Reception ==
Thin Mind received generally positive reviews from music critics, the album received an average score of 70 on Metacritic based on 13 reviews.

In the AllMusic review, critic Mark Deming stated that "Thin Mind is Wolf Parade in their classic form, but with a force and a sense of purpose that makes them sound fresh and vital. Losing DeCaro seems to have goaded Krug, Boeckner, and Thompson into showing their fans they still have the goods".

Professional ratings
Aggregate scores
Source	Rating
AnyDecentMusic?	7.3/10
Metacritic	70/100
Review scores
Source	Rating
AllMusic	4/5 stars
Exclaim!	6/10
Pitchfork	6.5/10
The Skinny	4/5 stars

== Track listing ==
No.	Title	Writer(s)	Length
1.	"Under Glass"	Dan Boeckner	3:21
2.	"Julia Take Your Man Home"	Spencer Krug	4:36
3.	"Forest Green"	Boeckner	5:05
4.	"Out of Control"	Krug	4:21
5.	"The Static Age"	Boeckner	3:59
6.	"As Kind as You Can"	Krug	5:10
7.	"Fall Into the Future"	Krug	3:12
8.	"Wandering Son"	Boeckner	4:57
9.	"Against the Day"	Boeckner; Krug	4:13
10.	"Town Square"	Krug	3:45
Total length:			42:39

== Personnel ==
Wolf Parade

- Dan Boeckner – vocals, guitar
- Spencer Krug – vocals, keyboards
- Arlen Thompson – drums

Production

- John Goodmanson – producer, engineering, mixing
- Anthony Sharkey – engineering and mixing assistant
- Noah Mintz – mastering
- Simony Roy and Hayleyglyphs – artwork
