= Divine Fits =

American-Canadian indie rock band

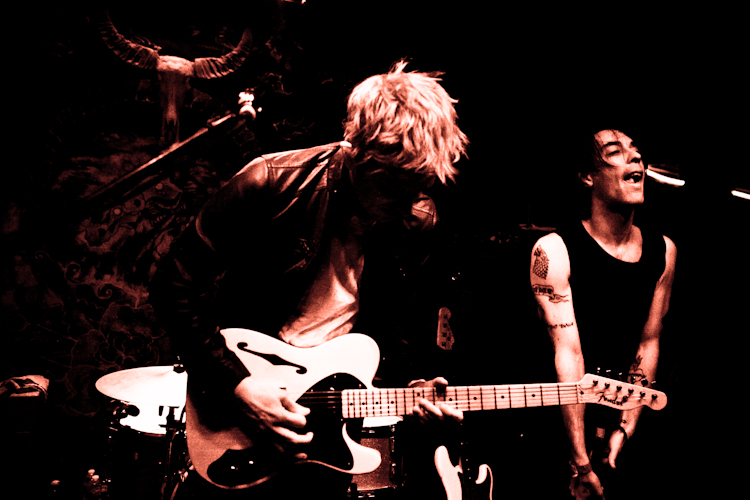
- Divine Fits performing at Pappy & Harriet's in 2012

Background information
- Genres: Indie rock, art rock
- Years active: 2011–2013
- Past members: Britt Daniel; Dan Boeckner; Sam Brown; Alex Fischel

Divine Fits was an American-Canadian indie rock band composed of Spoon members Britt Daniel and Alex Fischel, along with Dan Boeckner (Wolf Parade, Handsome Furs, Operators) and Sam Brown (New Bomb Turks). The group released their debut album, A Thing Called Divine Fits, in 2012 on Merge Records.

== History ==
The group formed in late 2011, after Daniel and Boeckner discussed forming a band together. Their first public performances were in Austin, Texas, where they had a surprise showing before having their official debut.

Their first album, A Thing Called Divine Fits, was released August 28, 2012 via Merge Records. It received positive reception from critics, with the Austinist and The Austin Chronicle praising the band. AllMusic scored it 4 out of 5 stars.

On November 16, 2012, the band made their television debut on Late Show with David Letterman.

On June 5, 2013, Divine Fits premiered two new singles, "Ain't That The Way" and "Chained to Love". on Conan. Jessica Dobson made an appearance with the band, playing guitar. The band's final show took place at The Parish in Austin, Texas on October 13, 2013. Daniel returned to performing with Spoon, with Fischel subsequently added as an official member on their next album They Want My Soul. Boeckner returned to Wolf Parade in 2016, while Brown formed the band Operators alongside Boeckner and Macedonian-American musician Devojka.

== Members ==
- Britt Daniel – vocals, guitar, bass, synthesizer, keyboards, piano, percussion, harmonizer
- Dan Boeckner – vocals, guitar, synthesizer, bass
- Sam Brown – drums, percussion
- Alex Fischel – synthesizer, guitar, keyboards, piano, organ, celeste

== Discography ==
- A Thing Called Divine Fits (2012)
