= Johnny and the Moon (album) =

Studio album by Johnny and the Moon
- Released: October 24, 2006
- Genre: Folk
- Length: 34:30
- Label: Kill Devil Hills Records

Professional ratings
Review scores
Source	Rating
Pitchfork Media	(7.0/10)

In 2006, Johnny and the Moon released its debut self-titled LP on British Columbia, Canada-based record company Kill Devil Hills. The album features Dante DeCaro on lead vocals, guitar, and banjo; Lindy Gerrard on drums; and Mark Devoe on bass and keyboard.

== Track listing ==
1. "Green Rocky Road" - 3:20
2. "Kid Heaven" - 2:34
3. "The Ballad of Scarlet Town" - 3:15
4. "Johnny and the Devil" - 4:20
5. "When You're All Alone" - 2:39
6. "All Things Gonna Come Back Around" - 3:24
7. "Little Red Cat" - 3:01
8. "Oleanna" - 2:49
9. "Scarlet Town, Pt. II" - 2:46
10. "Tamed a Lion" - 2:11
11. "When I Die" - 4:11
