= Random Spirit Lover =

Studio album by Sunset Rubdown
- Released: October 9, 2007
- Recorded: January 2007
- Studios: Breakglass Studios, Montreal, QC
- Genre: Indie rock
- Length: 58:30
- Label: Jagjaguwar

Sunset Rubdown chronology
Shut Up I Am Dreaming (2006)	Random Spirit Lover (2007)	Sunset Rubdown Introducing Moonface (2009)

Professional ratings
Review scores
Source	Rating
AllMusic	4/5 stars
Filter	90%
Now Magazine	4/5 stars
Pitchfork	8.5/10.0
PopMatters	9/10 stars
Robert Christgau	C+
Soundsect	4/5 stars
Stylus	A
Twisted Ear	5/5 stars

Random Spirit Lover is Sunset Rubdown's third LP, released on October 9, 2007. The album marked Sunset Rubdown's change from the Absolutely Kosher Records label to the Bloomington, Indiana-based Jagjaguwar records. The album was recorded in January 2007 at Breakglass Studios in Montreal with Jace Lasek and Dave Smith.

The album was leaked on July 27, 2007.

The album was voted in as the 14th best album of 2007 by readers of Pitchfork, while garnering the most 1st place votes.

== Track listing ==
1. "The Mending of the Gown" – 5:36
2. "Magic vs. Midas" – 5:59
3. "Up on Your Leopard, Upon the End of Your Feral Days" – 4:47
4. "The Courtesan Has Sung" – 4:31
5. "Winged/Wicked Things" – 4:46
6. "Colt Stands Up, Grows Horns" – 4:54
7. "Stallion" – 6:45
8. "For the Pier (and Dead Shimmering)" – 5:14
9. "The Taming of the Hands That Came Back to Life" – 6:06
10. "Setting vs. Rising" – 2:23
11. "Trumpet, Trumpet, Toot! Toot!" – 5:28
12. "Child-Heart Losers" – 2:01

== Personnel ==
Sunset Rubdown

- Spencer Krug – vocals, keyboards, guitar
- Camilla Wynne Ingr – percussion, keyboards, vocals
- Michael Doerksen – guitar, bass, synthesizers, drums, vocals
- Jordan Robson-Cramer – drums, guitar, keyboards

Production

- Jace Lasek – recording engineer
- Dave Smith – recording engineer
- Jenny Lee Craig – design, layout
