= Pink Elephant (Arcade Fire album) =

2025 studio album by Arcade Fire

- Standard cover

Studio album by Arcade Fire
- Released: May 9, 2025
- Length: 42:16
- Label: Columbia
- Producer: Win Butler; Régine Chassagne; Daniel Lanois

Arcade Fire chronology
We (2022)	Pink Elephant (2025)	Open Your Heart or Die Trying (2026)

Singles from Pink Elephant
- 1. "Year of the Snake" Released: April 8, 2025; 2. "Pink Elephant" Released: April 25, 2025

Pink Elephant is the seventh studio album by Canadian indie rock band Arcade Fire, released on May 9, 2025, on Columbia Records. Produced by band members Win Butler and Régine Chassagne and producer Daniel Lanois, the album was preceded by the singles "Year of the Snake" and "Pink Elephant".

The album received mixed reviews from critics. It also commercially underperformed, failing to chart on the Billboard 200 entirely in the United States. On 18 April 2026, Arcade Fire released Open Your Heart or Die Trying, an ambient companion album based on Pink Elephant.

== Background ==
On March 13, 2025, Arcade Fire debuted several new songs at Willie Nelson's Luck Reunion in Texas as a surprise guest. In April, the band began to preview snippets of new material on a new fan club mobile app named Circle of Trust. On April 5, Arcade Fire released a music video for the song "Cars and Telephones", which was reworked from a 2001 demo that preceded the formation of the band. The song did not make the final tracklist for Pink Elephant.

The album's lead single "Year of the Snake", named after the year on the Chinese zodiac that 2025 falls under, was released on April 8. A second single, "Pink Elephant", was released on April 25.

On April 14, the band announced a short North American tour, beginning on April 22 in Mexico City and ending on May 5 in Philadelphia.

On May 10, the band was the musical guest on Saturday Night Live, performing "Year of the Snake" and "Pink Elephant".

On June 9, the band was the musical guest on The Tonight Show Starring Jimmy Fallon, performing "Circle of Trust".

== Commercial performance ==
Pink Elephant failed to chart on the Billboard 200 in the United States, becoming the band's first album to do so. Hugh McIntyre of Forbes described the absence as "quite shocking", writing "Arcade Fire has never before seen one of its proper full-lengths fail to reach the tally."

Previously, Arcade Fire's lowest-charting album was Funeral, which reached No. 123 when it was released in 2004. Pink Elephant debuted at No. 10 on the Top Album Sales chart, selling 6,200 pure album purchases, No. 49 on the Top Rock & Alternative Albums chart, and No. 12 on the Vinyl Albums chart.

== Critical reception ==
Professional ratings
Aggregate scores
Source	Rating
Metacritic	55/100
Review scores
Source	Rating
AllMusic	2.5/5 stars
The Daily Telegraph	4/5 stars
MusicOMH	2.5/5 stars
Pitchfork	5.5/10
Rolling Stone	3/5 stars
Slant Magazine	2.5/5 stars
Sputnikmusic	1.5/5

Pink Elephant was met with mixed reviews from music critics. On Metacritic, it has a weighted average score of 55 out of 100 based on 12 reviews, indicating "mixed or average reviews".

Many reviewers noted the significance of Pink Elephant as the first album since the sexual misconduct allegations against Butler in 2022, which he vehemently denied. Will Dukes of Rolling Stone described the album as "a cathartic manifesto in miniature" and deemed it "sweet, enticing, and direct". Lewie Parkinson-Jones of Slant Magazine was less positive in his review, criticizing the lyrics as "problematic" and "remarkably tone-deaf" and considering Pink Elephant less substantial than the band's previous releases. In contrast, Neil McCormick of The Daily Telegraph gave the album 4/5 stars, writing "[Pink Elephant] is almost too personal, like listening to a preacher begging for forgiveness from his flock. Yet the sheer power of Arcade Fire in full flight should be enough to restore any sinner's faith in rock and roll."

== Track listing ==
All tracks are written by Win Butler and Régine Chassagne.

No.	Title	Length
1.	"Open Your Heart or Die Trying"	3:12
2.	"Pink Elephant"	4:44
3.	"Year of the Snake"	5:10
4.	"Circle of Trust"	6:05
5.	"Alien Nation"	3:24
6.	"Beyond Salvation"	1:20
7.	"Ride or Die"	4:08
8.	"I Love Her Shadow"	5:29
9.	"She Cries Diamond Rain"	1:21
10.	"Stuck in My Head"	7:23
Total length:		42:16

== Personnel ==
Credits adapted from Tidal.

=== Arcade Fire ===
- Win Butler – synthesizer (tracks 1–5, 7–10), vocals (2–5, 7–10), bass guitar (2, 4, 8, 10); background vocals, electric guitar (2, 5); drums, percussion (3, 4, 8); drum machine (3, 5); acoustic guitar, pedal steel guitar (3); theremin (5, 6), cowbell (5); timpani, Wurlitzer piano (7); organ (8); cymbals, Mellotron (10)
- Régine Chassagne – synthesizer (tracks 2–7), vocals (2–5, 7–9), bass guitar (2–4, 7), drums (2, 8, 10), pedal steel guitar (3), programming (4, 8), theremin (5, 6), Mellotron (6, 8, 9); bells, glockenspiel, timpani (10)
- Jeremy Gara – drums (tracks 5, 8, 10), synthesizer (10)
- Tim Kingsbury – bass guitar (track 5), acoustic guitar (10)
- Richard Reed Parry – electric guitar (tracks 2, 5, 10), bass guitar (10)

=== Additional musicians ===
- Daniel Lanois – percussion (tracks 3, 4, 6–8, 10), pedal steel guitar (3)
- Dan Boeckner – electric guitar (tracks 2, 5)
- Micah Nelson – electric guitar (track 3)
- Brian Blade – drums (tracks 4, 8)
- Sarah Neufeld – violin (tracks 6, 8–10)
- Marley Mackey – synthesizer (track 6)

=== Technical personnel ===
- Daniel Lanois – production
- Win Butler – production
- Régine Chassagne – production
- Gerardo "Jerry" Ordonez – co-production, mixing (tracks 1–8, 10), engineering
- Eric Heigle – co-production (tracks 1–8, 10), additional engineering (1–8)
- John Krischer – additional engineering (track 8)
- Maria Paula Mariño – engineering assistance (tracks 2–4, 10)
- Emily Eck – engineering assistance (track 5)
- Marc Olivier-Germain – mastering

== Charts ==
Chart performance for Pink Elephant
Chart (2025)	Peak position
Austrian Albums (Ö3 Austria)	8
Belgian Albums (Ultratop Flanders)	3
Belgian Albums (Ultratop Wallonia)	8
Canadian Albums (Billboard)	60
Dutch Albums (Album Top 100)	26
French Albums (SNEP)	37
French Rock & Metal Albums (SNEP)	5
German Albums (Offizielle Top 100)	11
Irish Albums (OCC)	45
Italian Albums (FIMI)	45
Portuguese Albums (AFP)	9
Scottish Albums (OCC)	4
Swiss Albums (Schweizer Hitparade)	4
UK Albums (OCC)	18
US Top Rock & Alternative Albums (Billboard)	49
