= Shut Up I Am Dreaming =

Studio album by Sunset Rubdown
- Released: May 2, 2006
- Genre: Alternative rock
- Length: 46:07
- Label: Absolutely Kosher

Sunset Rubdown chronology
Sunset Rubdown (2006)	Shut Up I Am Dreaming (2006)	Random Spirit Lover (2007)

Professional ratings
Aggregate scores
Source	Rating
Metacritic	81/100
Review scores
Source	Rating
AllMusic	4/5 stars
Cokemachineglow	84%
Pitchfork	8.6/10
PopMatters	8/10
Spin	3/5 stars
Sputnikmusic	5/5
Stylus	A−
Tiny Mix Tapes	3/5 stars

Shut Up I Am Dreaming is the second studio album by Sunset Rubdown, released in May 2006 on Absolutely Kosher Records. It is the first album showcasing the expanded Sunset Rubdown line-up, featuring new members Camilla Wynn Ingr, Michael Doerksen, and Jordan Robson-Cramer. The album was met with critical acclaim. It was named the 27th best album of 2006 by Stylus Magazine and the 15th best on Pitchfork's Top 50 Albums of 2006.

== Track listing ==
1. "Stadiums and Shrines II" – 3:57
2. "They Took a Vote and Said No" – 3:43
3. "Us Ones in Between" – 4:26
4. "I'm Sorry I Sang on Your Hands That Have Been in the Grave" – 5:32
5. "Snake's Got a Leg III" – 3:52
6. "The Empty Threats of Little Lord" – 5:07
7. "Swimming" – 3:41
8. "The Men Are Called Horsemen There" – 7:05
9. "Q-Chord" – 1:21
10. "Shut Up I Am Dreaming of Places Where Lovers Have Wings" – 7:23

== Personnel ==
Sunset Rubdown

- Spencer Krug – vocals, keys, guitar, kick drum
- Camilla Wynne Ingr – vocals, percussion, keyboards
- Michael Doerksen – guitar, bass, synthesizers, drums, vocals
- Jordan Robson-Cramer – drums, guitar, keyboards

Production

- Jace Lasek – recording, engineering
- Dave Smith – recording, engineering
- Harris Newman – mastering
- Matt Moroz – design
