= Organ Music Not Vibraphone Like I'd Hoped =

Studio album by Moonface
- Released: August 2, 2011
- Recorded: Winter 2010–2011
- Genre: Indie rock
- Length: 46:28
- Label: Jagjaguwar
- Producer: Spencer Krug

Professional ratings
Review scores
Source	Rating
The A.V. Club	C+
Coke Machine Glow	80%
Consequence of Sound	2.5/5 stars
The Guardian	3/5 stars
No Ripcord	4/10 stars
One Thirty BPM	80%
Paste Magazine	8.3
Pitchfork	6.1
Uncut	3/5 stars
Tiny Mix Tapes	3/5 marks

Organ Music Not Vibraphone Like I'd Hoped is the first full-length album released by musician Spencer Krug under his Moonface moniker. It is the follow-up to the 2010 EP Dreamland EP: Marimba and Shit-Drums and was released on August 2, 2011.

== Background ==
Krug intended to compile an album of hypnotic drones using an old double-manual home organ and a Leslie speaker cabinet. Krug, however, became enamoured by the variety of bleeps, bass sounds and disco rhythms generated by the organ, and instead opted to make a record of synth-pop-oriented music. Influences on the album include Suicide, OMD and Depeche Mode.

== Track listing ==
All songs written by Spencer Krug.

1. "Return to the Violence of the Ocean Floor" - 7:17
2. "Whale Song (Song Instead of a Kiss)" - 8:04
3. "Fast Peter" - 8:03
4. "Shit-Hawk in the Snow" - 7:29
5. "Loose Heart = Loose Plan" - 6:39
6. “The Way You Wish You Could Live In The Storm” - 8:34
