= Cry Cry Cry (Wolf Parade album) =

Studio album by Wolf Parade
- Released: October 6, 2017
- Studio: Robert Lang (Shoreline, Washington); The Noise Floor (Gabriola Island, Canada)
- Genre: Indie rock
- Length: 47:26
- Label: Sub Pop
- Producer: John Goodmanson

Wolf Parade chronology
Wolf Parade (2016 EP) (2016)	Cry Cry Cry (2017)	Thin Mind (2020)

Professional ratings
Aggregate scores
Source	Rating
AnyDecentMusic?	7.7/10
Metacritic	82/100
Review scores
Source	Rating
AllMusic	4/5 stars
The A.V. Club	A−
Consequence of Sound	B
Exclaim!	7/10
The Guardian	4/5 stars
Pitchfork	6.7/10
The Skinny	5/5 stars
Q	4/5 stars
Record Collector	3/5 stars
Spin	8/10

Cry Cry Cry is the fourth studio album by the Canadian indie rock band Wolf Parade, released on October 6, 2017 on Sub Pop. Produced by John Goodmanson, the album was recorded after a five-year hiatus from band activities, and is the band's final album to feature multi-instrumentalist Dante DeCaro.

== Track listing ==
No.	Title	Writer(s)	Length
1.	"Lazarus Online"	Spencer Krug	3:26
2.	"You're Dreaming"	Dan Boeckner	3:39
3.	"Valley Boy"	Krug	3:39
4.	"Incantation"	Boeckner	4:23
5.	"Flies on the Sun"	Boeckner	3:43
6.	"Baby Blue"	Krug	6:00
7.	"Weaponized"	Boeckner	6:40
8.	"Who Are Ya"	Krug	3:44
9.	"Am I an Alien Here"	Krug	3:36
10.	"Artificial Life"	Boeckner	3:48
11.	"King of Piss and Paper"	Krug	4:48
Total length:			47:26

== Personnel ==
Wolf Parade

- Spencer Krug – vocals, keyboards
- Dan Boeckner – vocals, guitar
- Arlen Thompson – drums
- Dante DeCaro – guitar, bass, percussion, keyboards

Additional musicians

- Chris Thompson – horns (tracks 4, 6 and 9)
- Patrick Simpson – horns (tracks 4, 6 and 9)
- Phil Hamelin – horns (tracks 4, 6 and 9)

Production

- John Goodmanson – producer, engineering, mixing
- Eric Corson – engineering
- Greg Calbi – mastering
- Steve Fallone – additional mastering
- Jordan Koop – assistant mixing
- Inka Bell – artwork, design
- Ray Janos – lacquer cut

== Charts ==
Chart (2017)	Peak position
Canadian Albums (Billboard)	82
