= At Mount Zoomer =

Studio album by Wolf Parade
- Released: June 17, 2008
- Recorded: Petite Église: Farnham; MIXart Studios: Montreal; Mount Zoomer: Montreal
- Genre: Indie rock
- Length: 46:42
- Label: Sub Pop
- Producer: Wolf Parade

Wolf Parade chronology
Apologies to the Queen Mary (2005)	At Mount Zoomer (2008)	Expo 86 (2010)

At Mount Zoomer is the second studio album by the Canadian indie rock band Wolf Parade, released on June 17, 2008 on Sub Pop. Self-produced by the band itself, it is Wolf Parade's only studio album to feature all five band members – Spencer Krug, Dan Boeckner, Arlen Thompson, Hadji Bakara and Dante DeCaro – and the last to feature Bakara, who departed from the band shortly after the recording process to focus on his academic studies.

== Album title ==
The album is named after Wolf Parade drummer Arlen Thompson's sound studio, Mount Zoomer; the name of the studio references "a B.C. euphemism for magic mushrooms", and also nods to the Montreal band A Silver Mount Zion. The album was originally meant to be entitled Kissing the Beehive; however, due to possible copyright infringements in relation to Jonathan Carroll's 1997 novel of the same name, this title was changed. Singer and keyboardist Spencer Krug said that the band "didn't know that was the title of a book... We might have to change it, but we might not. And we'll have to make it clear that it's not [named] after his book. It's a complicated situation." It had also been reported earlier by Blender that the record was entitled Pardon My Blues; however, on April 28, Sub Pop officially announced that the album's name would be At Mount Zoomer.

== Album overview ==
The band started playing new songs live that would end up on At Mount Zoomer as early as summer 2007. Among the first to be played were "Language City" and "Fine Young Cannibals".

According to singer and guitarist Dan Boeckner, half of the album was recorded in Farnham, Quebec at Petite Église, an old church that was converted to a recording studio by the band Arcade Fire for the production of their album Neon Bible. After touring the east coast in late 2007, Wolf Parade recorded the rest of At Mount Zoomer at MIXart Studios in Montreal, Quebec. Afterwards, the album was mixed at Arlen Thompson's sound studio, Mount Zoomer.

The cover art for the album features the work of Matt Moroz and Elizabeth Huey, depicting a battle scene between the two artists.

The track "Call It a Ritual" was released by the band on April 14, 2008.

== Reception ==
Professional ratings
Aggregate scores
Source	Rating
Metacritic	78/100
Review scores
Source	Rating
AllMusic	4.5/5 stars
The A.V. Club	B−
Blender	4/5 stars
The Boston Phoenix	4/4 stars
Entertainment Weekly	B
The Guardian	2/5 stars
Pitchfork	7.7/10
Q	4/5 stars
Rolling Stone	3.5/5 stars
Spin	3.5/5 stars

At Mount Zoomer received positive reviews from critics. On Metacritic, the album holds a score of 78 out of 100 based on 28 reviews, indicating "generally favorable reviews".

== Track listing ==
All music is composed by Hadji Bakara, Dan Boeckner, Dante DeCaro, Spencer Krug, and Arlen Thompson

No.	Title	Lyrics	Length
1.	"Soldier's Grin"	Boeckner	4:37
2.	"Call It a Ritual"	Krug	2:45
3.	"Language City"	Boeckner	5:02
4.	"Bang Your Drum"	Krug	3:10
5.	"California Dreamer"	Krug	6:00
6.	"The Grey Estates"	Boeckner	3:26
7.	"Fine Young Cannibals"	Boeckner	6:31
8.	"An Animal in Your Care"	Krug	4:19
9.	"Kissing the Beehive"	Boeckner; Krug	10:52
Total length:			46:42

== Personnel ==
Wolf Parade

- Dan Boeckner – guitar, vocals
- Spencer Krug – piano, keyboards, vocals
- Arlen Thompson – drums, recording (tracks 1, 2, 4, 6–8)
- Hadji Bakara – keyboards, electronics
- Dante DeCaro – bass, guitar, percussion

Production

- Wolf Parade – producing, overdubs and vocal recording, mixing
- David Ferry – recording (tracks 3, 5, 9)
- Nick Petrowski – recording (tracks 3, 5, 9)
- David Smith – recording of "some vocals"
- Jace Lasek – recording of "some vocals"
- Harris Newman – mastering
- Elizabeth Huey – artwork
- Matt Moroz – artwork
