= Wolf Parade (2005 EP) =

EP by Wolf Parade

EP by Wolf Parade
- Released: July 12, 2005
- Genre: Indie rock
- Length: 13:35
- Label: Sub Pop SP678
- Producer: Isaac Brock, Wolf Parade

Wolf Parade chronology
Wolf Parade (2004 EP) (2004)	Wolf Parade (2005)	Apologies to the Queen Mary (2005)

Professional ratings
Review scores
Source	Rating
AllMusic	3/5 stars
Pitchfork Media	7.1/10

Wolf Parade is an EP by the Canadian indie band Wolf Parade. It was released on July 12, 2005, on Sub Pop. "Shine a Light" and an extended version of "You Are a Runner and I Am My Father's Son" appear on the band's Apologies to the Queen Mary.

== Track listing ==
All music is composed by Hadji Bakara, Dan Boeckner, Spencer Krug, and Arlen Thompson

No.	Title	Lyrics	Length
1.	"Shine a Light"	Boeckner	3:44
2.	"You Are a Runner and I Am My Father's Son"	Krug	2:35
3.	"Disco Sheets"	Krug	2:59
4.	"Lousy Pictures"	Boeckner	4:17
Total length:			13:35

== Personnel ==
Wolf Parade

- Dan Boeckner – guitar, vocals
- Spencer Krug – piano, keyboards, vocals
- Arlen Thompson – drums
- Hadji Bakara – keyboards, electronics

Additional musician

- Tim Kingsbury – bass (track 1)

Production

- Wolf Parade – producer (tracks 1, 3), mixing (tracks 1, 3)
- Isaac Brock – producer (tracks 2, 4)
- Chris Chandler – engineer (tracks 2, 4)
- Jace Lasek – mixing (tracks 2, 4)
- Tony Gillis – mastering (vinyl)
- Harris Newman – mastering (CD)
- Matt Moroz – illustration, art direction
- Dusty Summers – layout
