= Handsome Furs =

Canadian band

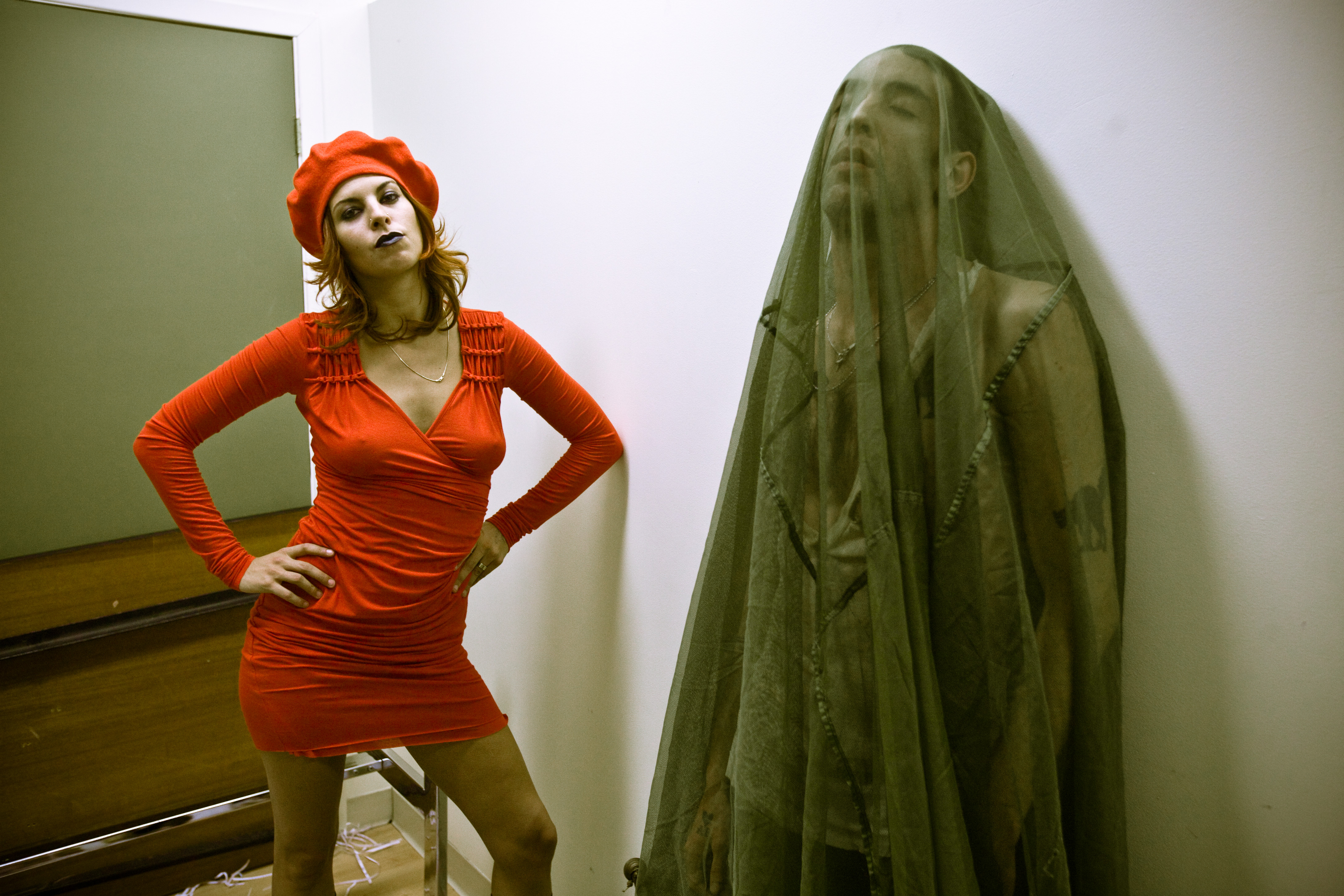

Background information
- Origin: Montreal, Quebec, Canada
- Genres: Indie rock, post-punk revival
- Years active: 2006–2012
- Label: Sub Pop
- Members: Dan Boeckner; Alexei Perry
- Website: subpop.com/artists/handsome_furs

Handsome Furs was a Montreal-based indie rock duo which consisted of Dan Boeckner and Alexei Perry, who were married at the time. Boeckner is best known for his time in the bands Wolf Parade and Atlas Strategic. The band announced its breakup on May 17, 2012 via Facebook.

== History ==
=== Music ===
Handsome Furs signed on to Sub Pop Records in late 2006, and released their first full-length album, Plague Park, in 2007. "Handsome Furs" was the title of a short story that Alexei was writing at the time of the band's conception.

In a December 2007 interview, Boeckner revealed that the band was in the writing stages of a new full-length album, to be titled Face Control:

"When Alexei and I got back from Russia we were going to do an EP, but we're also going to do a full album of new songs because we have so many. It's going to be different than the last record... The last one was so intense and heavy in one direction that we wanted to do something different..."

The inspiration behind Face Control was a peculiar aspect of club culture they observed while on tour in Eastern Europe: if party goers wish to reserve a table at a bar in Moscow, they must pay large sums of money through PayPal or with cash, however their seat is still not guaranteed; bouncers have the authority to turn reserved patrons away from the bar based solely on appearance, which has been termed "face control".

A number of new songs were showcased during their spring tour: "Officer of Hearts", "Heaven", "Legal Tender", and "Radio Kaliningrad". On November 12, 2008, Sub Pop records announced that Handsome Furs' second album Face Control would be released February 3, 2009. Also reported was the album's complete track listing, which includes twelve tracks.

Later the release date was pushed back to March 10; a New Order song is referenced in the track "All We Want, Baby, Is Everything" and this needed to be cleared with the band. The first single from Face Control is "I'm Confused," and the video is directed by Scott Coffey.

Their third album, Sound Kapital was released on June 28, 2011.

A number of Handsome Furs tracks were included in the score of 2013 comedy-drama film Adult World.

=== Media ===
The duo starred in a new original travel web series, Indie Asia produced by CNN.com that premiered January 21, 2010. The weekly documentary series followed the band's travels in China, Hong Kong, Thailand, and Vietnam. While on their first Asian tour, the group stopped and performed at Club Culture in Bangkok, Thailand. They have also played in China more than once and have worked closely with China-based promoters Split Works on both occasions.

== Discography ==
=== Albums ===
- Plague Park (2007)
- Face Control (2009)
- Sound Kapital (2011)

=== Singles ===
- "Dumb Animals" (2007)
- "Can't Get Started" (2007)
- "I'm Confused" (2009)
- "What About Us" (2011)

== See also ==
- Music of Canada
- Music of Quebec
- Canadian rock
- List of Canadian musicians
- List of bands from Canada
- Category:Canadian musical groups
