= Fifths of Seven =

- Origin: Montreal, Quebec, Canada
- Genre: Instrumental
- Years active: 1995–2005
- Label: DSA
- Members: Spencer Krug; Beckie Foon; Rachel Levine

Fifths of Seven was a Canadian instrumental string/piano/accordion trio based in Montreal, Quebec. The band members were Spencer Krug, Beckie Foon, and Rachel Levine (Cakelk). The group's instrumental music combined elements of pop, classical and eastern European music.

== History ==
Fifths of Seven was formed in 1995 in Montreal, Their debut album, Spry from Bitter Anise Folds, was recorded in Montreal at Breakglass Studio and released in 2005. This was the only album recorded by the group.

== Discography ==
Spry from Bitter Anise Folds

Studio album by Fifths of Seven
- Released: August 22, 2005 (US)
- Recorded: 2004
- Genre: Instrumental
- Length: 46:17
- Label: DSA

Professional ratings
Review scores
Source	Rating
Pitchfork Media	(7.7/10)
PopMatters	(7/10)

- Spry from Bitter Anise Folds (LP), 2005
  1. "Rosa Centifolia" - 5:33
  2. "Sweet Grace for Devious" - 5:53
  3. "Out from Behind the Rigid Bellows" - 6:49
  4. "Waiting" - 2:58
  5. "Coeur, Arteries and Veins" - 4:58
  6. "Echoes from a Wandered Path" - 5:47
  7. "For You Alone in the Smoldering City" - 9:42
  8. "Bless Our Wandering Dreamers" - 4:37
