= Wolf Parade (2016 EP) =

EP by Wolf Parade

EP by Wolf Parade
- Released: May 17, 2016
- Studio: Cobble Hill, British Columbia
- Genre: Indie rock
- Length: 12:42
- Label: Wolf Parade Productions (Self-released)
- Producer: Wolf Parade

Wolf Parade chronology
Expo 86 (2010)	Wolf Parade (2016)	Cry Cry Cry (2017)

Wolf Parade is an EP by the Canadian indie band Wolf Parade. It was released on May 17, 2016.

== Reception ==
Professional ratings
Aggregate scores
Source	Rating
Metacritic	75/100
Review scores
Source	Rating
Consequence of Sound	B
Exclaim!	7/10
Pitchfork	7/10
Sputnikmusic	3.9/5
Tiny Mix Tapes	3.5/5 stars

Wolf Parade received positive reviews from critics. On Metacritic, the EP holds a score of 75/100 based on 5 reviews, indicating "generally favorable reviews".

== Track listing ==
All music is composed by Dan Boeckner, Dante DeCaro, Spencer Krug, and Arlen Thompson.

No.	Title	Lyrics	Length
1.	"Automatic"	Boeckner	2:39
2.	"Mr. Startup"	Krug	3:31
3.	"C'est La Vie Way"	Krug	3:50
4.	"Floating World"	Boeckner	2:42
Total length:			12:42

== Personnel ==
Wolf Parade

- Dan Boeckner – vocals, guitar
- Spencer Krug – vocals, keyboards
- Arlen Thompson – drums
- Dante DeCaro – guitar, bass, percussion, keyboards

Production

- Wolf Parade – recording
- Jordan Koop – recording
- Michael McCarthy – mixing (tracks 1, 4)
- Jonas Verwijnen – mixing (tracks 2, 3)
- Harris Newman – mastering
- Luke Ramsey – artwork
