= Wolf Parade (2003 EP) =

EP by Wolf Parade

Four song

EP by Wolf Parade
- Released: 2003
- Recorded: July 2003 at Arcade Fire's practice space
- Genre: Indie rock
- Length: 16:09
- Label: Self-released

Wolf Parade chronology
Four song (2003)	Wolf Parade (2004)

Alternative Cover
- Originally released with a screen-printed cloth sleeve, the EP was later packaged in plastic when sales became too demanding.

Wolf Parade (4 Song EP) is the first EP by Canadian indie rock band Wolf Parade.

Rerecorded versions of "Modern World" and "Dinner Bells" would later appear on their debut LP Apologies to the Queen Mary, along with the version of "Modern World" that appears on this EP as a bonus track on the iTunes release of the LP, under the name "Modern World (Original)".

== Track listing ==
All music is composed by Dan Boeckner, Spencer Krug, and Arlen Thompson

No.	Title	Lyrics	Length
1.	"Modern World"	Boeckner	2:46
2.	"Wits or a Dagger"	Krug	3:40
3.	"Secret Knives"	Boeckner	3:24
4.	"Dinner Bells"	Krug	6:25
Total length:			16:09

== Credits ==
Wolf Parade

- Dan Boeckner – guitar, vocals
- Spencer Krug – piano, keyboards, vocals, cover art, design
- Arlen Thompson – drums, engineering, mastering

Production

- Jenny Lee Craig – cover art, design
