= Wolf Parade (2004 EP) =

EP by Wolf Parade

EP by Wolf Parade
- Released: 2004
- Genre: Indie
- Length: 22:47
- Label: Self-released
- Producer: Wolf Parade

Wolf Parade chronology
Wolf Parade (2003 EP) (2003)	Wolf Parade (2004)	Wolf Parade (2005 EP) (2005)

Wolf Parade (6 Song EP) is the second EP by Canadian indie rock band Wolf Parade. The EP is a collaborative effort by the band members. Song writing and vocals are split between members Dan Boeckner and Spencer Krug.

All songs but "The National People's Scare" and "Killing Armies" would later be re-recorded for the band's debut LP Apologies to the Queen Mary. The recording of Killing Armies from this EP appears as an iTunes bonus track for the LP.

The EP is packaged in a clear plastic sleeve, with the CD itself wrapped in a tri-fold piece of paper with the album artwork and track listing on it. The artwork was made by Tracy Maurice.

== Track listing ==
All music is composed by Hadji Bakara, Dan Boeckner, Spencer Krug, and Arlen Thompson

No.	Title	Lyrics	Length
1.	"Dear Sons and Daughters of Hungry Ghosts"	Krug	3:58
2.	"We Built Another World"	Boeckner	3:23
3.	"Grounds for Divorce"	Krug	3:44
4.	"It's a Curse"	Boeckner	3:33
5.	"The National People's Scare"	Boeckner	5:15
6.	"Killing Armies"	Krug	2:50
Total length:			22:47

== Personnel ==
Wolf Parade

- Dan Boeckner – guitar, vocals
- Spencer Krug – piano, keyboards, vocals
- Arlen Thompson – drums, recording
- Hadji Bakara – keyboards, electronics

Production

- Tracy Maurice – artwork, design
