= Dante DeCaro =

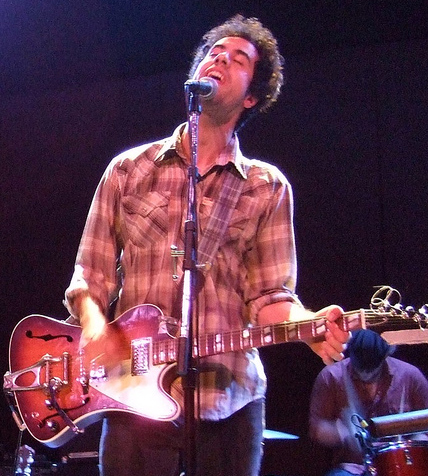
- Dante DeCaro in 2007

Background information
- Born: January 26, 1981 (age 45)
- Origin: Shawnigan Lake, British Columbia, Canada
- Genres: Indie rock
- Occupation: Musician
- Years active: 1999–present
- Labels: Sub Pop, Warner Bros., Kill Devil Hills

Dante DeCaro (born January 26, 1981) is a Canadian musician who was the guitarist and songwriter of the Canadian band Hot Hot Heat and a mult-instrumentalist in the indie rock band Wolf Parade.

DeCaro initially joined Hot Hot Heat in 2001 and was with the band until he announced his departure from in October 2004. Despite the announcement, he stayed to complete the band's 2005 album, Elevator.

In the spring of 2005, he began playing solo acoustic shows with drummer Arlen Thompson of the Montreal band Wolf Parade. DeCaro officially joined Wolf Parade as their new guitarist in summer 2005. In 2019, Wolf Parade announced that he had left the band.

DeCaro now fronts local Shawnigan Lake band Johnny and the Moon. The band released its self-titled debut album in 2006 on Kill Devil Hills Records.

On November 18, 2023, it was announced that Hot Hot Heat had reformed, with DeCaro returning to the band. However, the reunion would be short lived with Hot Hot Heat disbanding again on January 26, 2024.

== Discography ==
=== Hot Hot Heat ===
- Knock Knock Knock (2002) Sub Pop
- Make Up the Breakdown (2002) Sub Pop
- Elevator (2005) Warner Bros.

=== Wolf Parade ===
- At Mount Zoomer (2008) Sub Pop
- Expo 86 (2010) Sub Pop
- Wolf Parade (EP) (2016) Self-released.
- Cry Cry Cry (2017) Sub Pop

=== Johnny and the Moon ===
- Johnny and the Moon (2006) Kill Devil Hills Records

=== Dante Decaro ===
- Kill your boyfriend EP (2016) Last Gang Records
