= Expo 86 (album) =

Studio album by Wolf Parade
- Released: June 29, 2010
- Recorded: 2009
- Studios: Hotel2Tango in Montreal, Quebec, Canada
- Genre: Indie rock
- Length: 55:34
- Label: Sub Pop

Wolf Parade chronology
| At Mount Zoomer (2008) | Expo 86 (2010) | Wolf Parade (2016 EP) (2016) |

Expo 86 is the third studio album by the Canadian indie rock band Wolf Parade, on 29 June 2010 on Sub Pop. Recorded and mixed by Howard Bilerman at Hotel2Tango in Montreal, it was the band's final studio album before entering an indefinite hiatus in 2011.

== Reception ==
Professional ratings
Aggregate scores
| Source | Rating |
|---|---|
| Metacritic | 75/100 |
Review scores
| Source | Rating |
| AllMusic | 4/5 stars |
| The A.V. Club | (A−) |
| Drowned in Sound | 3.5/5 stars |
| The Guardian | 4/5 stars |
| No Ripcord | 7/10 stars |
| Paste Magazine | (8.3/10) |
| Pitchfork | (7.5/10) |
| PopMatters | 2.5/5 stars |
| SPIN | 3.5/5 stars |
| Sputnikmusic | 4/5 stars |
| Consequence of Sound | 4/5 stars |
| The Tune | (3.3/5) |

Expo 86 received positive reviews from critics. On Metacritic, the album holds a score of 75/100 based on 26 reviews, indicating "generally favorable reviews".

"Expo 86" was recognized by Exclaim! as the No. 17 Pop & Rock Album of 2010. Exclaim! writer Josh O'Kane said: "Long gone are the densely layered sonic landscapes of Wolf Parade albums past ― Expo 86 marks an evolution in sound, but not a change. It's Spencer Krug's manic-pop circus meeting Dan Boeckner's twitchy Springsteen revivalism in one sprawling album that's simultaneously more disjointed and more confident than ever."

== Track listing ==
All music is composed by Dan Boeckner, Dante DeCaro, Spencer Krug, and Arlen Thompson

| No. | Title | Lyrics | Length |
|---|---|---|---|
| 1. | "Cloud Shadow on the Mountain" | Krug | 4:22 |
| 2. | "Palm Road" | Boeckner | 4:41 |
| 3. | "What Did My Lover Say? (It Always Had to Go This Way)" | Krug | 5:42 |
| 4. | "Little Golden Age" | Boeckner | 5:00 |
| 5. | "In the Direction of the Moon" | Krug | 5:46 |
| 6. | "Ghost Pressure" | Boeckner | 5:16 |
| 7. | "Pobody's Nerfect" | Boeckner | 5:50 |
| 8. | "Two Men in New Tuxedos" | Krug | 3:09 |
| 9. | "Oh You, Old Thing" | Krug | 5:46 |
| 10. | "Yulia" | Boeckner | 3:47 |
| 11. | "Cave-o-Sapien" | Krug | 6:19 |
| Total length: | | | 55:34 |

== Personnel ==
Wolf Parade

- Dan Boeckner – vocals, guitar
- Spencer Krug – vocals, keyboards
- Arlen Thompson – drums, additional engineering, mixing
- Dante DeCaro – guitar, bass, percussion, keyboards

Production

- Howard Bilerman – recording, mixing
- Efrim Menuck – additional engineering
- Gabrielle Butler – engineer (intern)
- Harris Newman – mastering
- John Golden – lacquer cut
- Dusty Summers and Wolf Parade – design
- Meqo Sam Cecil – photography
- Nick DeCaro – back cover photo
- Des Shearing – front cover photo

== Charts ==
| Chart (2010) | Peak position |
|---|---|
| US Billboard 200 | 48 |
| Canadian Albums (Billboard) | 24 |
| US Top Alternative Albums (Billboard) | 6 |
| US Tastemakers Albums (Billboard) | 6 |
| US Top Rock Albums (Billboard) | 10 |
| US Top Album Sales (Billboard) | 48 |
| US Digital Albums (Billboard) | 20 |
| US Independent Albums (Billboard) | 6 |
