= Sunset Rubdown =

Canadian art rock music group

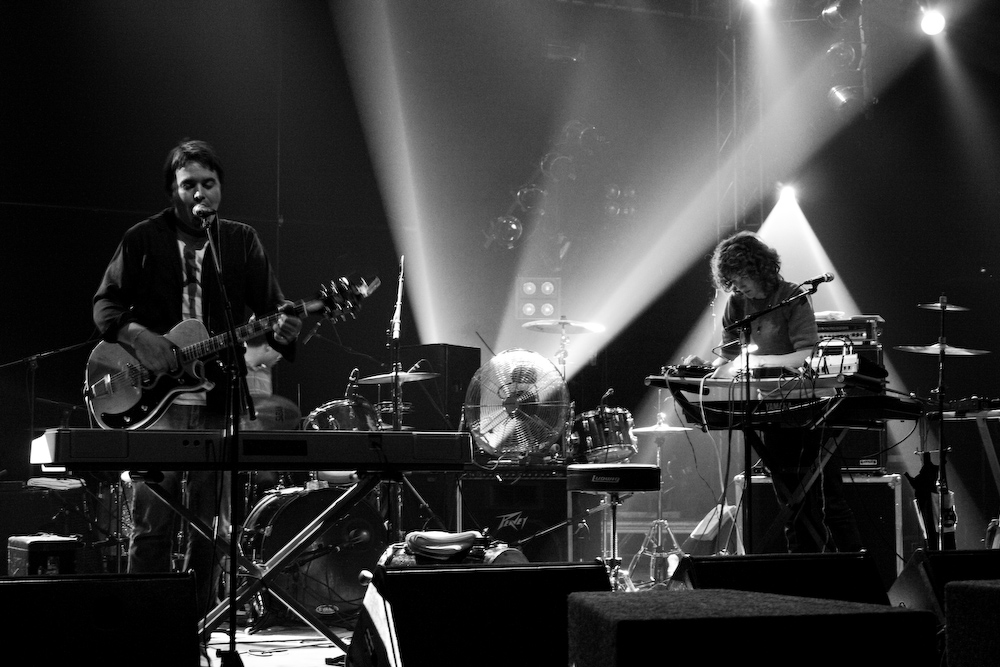
- Sunset Rubdown performing in 2009

Background information
- Origin: Montreal, Quebec, Canada
- Genres: Indie rock, art rock
- Years active: 2005–2009, 2022–present
- Labels: Absolutely Kosher, Global Symphonic, Jagjaguwar
- Members: Spencer Krug; Camilla Wynne Ingr; Michael Doerksen; Jordan Robson-Cramer; Nicholas Merz
- Past members: Mark Nicol

Sunset Rubdown is a Canadian art rock music group from Montreal. The band began as a solo project for Spencer Krug of Wolf Parade, who released his debut, Snake's Got a Leg, in early 2005. By the next year the project expanded to become a full band which included Camilla Wynne, Jordan Robson-Cramer (Magic Weapon), and Michael Doerksen.

== Musical style ==
Sunset Rubdown is built around lyricist Spencer Krug's vocals and eccentric musical compositions. Krug's lyrics are characterized by surreal and mythological imagery, and often tell epic stories (most notably on their LP Dragonslayer). Musically, the band's sound is highlighted by distinct drum, keyboard, and guitar signatures.

== Album releases ==
Krug released his first solo album under the name Sunset Rubdown in June 2005 titled Snake's Got a Leg. A collection of experimental solo creations he recorded on his laptop. One year later in 2006, Krug released the solo-created Sunset Rubdown EP in January. This was followed by the first full band album Shut Up I Am Dreaming recorded in Montreal in early 2006 and released in May to positive reviews, finishing the year with a 15th-place ranking on Pitchfork's best albums list.

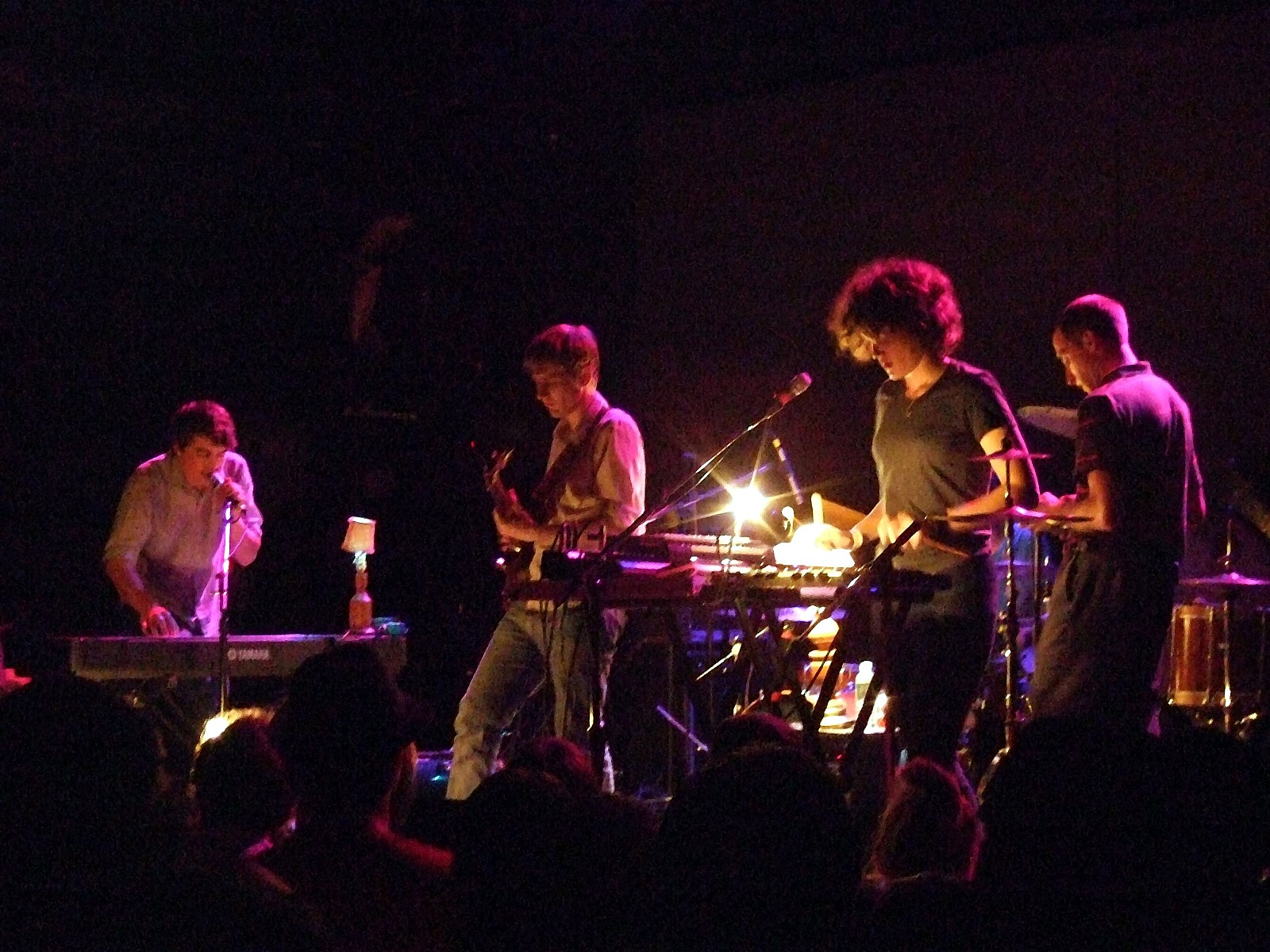
Performing in New York City in 2007

Random Spirit Lover, recorded in Montreal's Breakglass Studio in the late winter of 2007, was released on the band's new label, Jagjaguwar, in October of that year. The recording featured an eclectic, and elaborate collection of songs, which was heralded as one of 2007's best albums by several critics and music publications. The CD made a number of top-20 albums of the year lists, earned Pitchfork's "Best New Music" distinction and finished in 14th spot in Pitchfork's year-end Readers Poll. The album also made NPR's list of top albums of 2007, and was nominated for the U.S. Indie Music industry's Plug Award in the Best Indie Album of the Year category.

In 2007, Mark Nicol was added as the band's fifth member. Sunset Rubdown completed their first tour of UK and Europe in June 2008.

The band recorded their fourth album in Chicago after a fall 2008 tour of the U.S.. Following a spring 2009 tour of several European countries, Dragonslayer was released on June 23, 2009 to critical acclaim. The album's 'live off the studio floor' dynamics has garnered widespread acclaim. The band once again earned Pitchfork's "Best New Music" ranking, and received a perfect '10' from England's Drowned in Sound web magazine, with Dragonslayer staying in the top-10 on Canadian and U.S. college and indie music charts (including the Earshot Radio Chart, and Chart Attack) for 10 straight weeks through July and August 2009.

Dragonslayer finished on many online music magazine and music blogs top albums year-end lists (Drowned in Sound, Associated Press, Earshot), including several Top 10 lists (Chart Attack, Cokemachineglow). The album was voted as the 16th best album of the year in Pitchfork's year-end readers poll and also finished as one of the top-40 highest ranked/reviewed albums of the year based on Metacritic's tracking system.

The band completed a 46-city tour of Europe, U.S and Japan from September to November 2009, after which they disbanded.

In December 2022, the band announced a two-month reunion tour of the U.S. and Canada slated for the spring of 2023. Based on the success of that tour the band announced their plans to record their fifth album - after a 14-year hiatus - in the coming year. On July 8, 2024 they released the song "Reappearing Rat" on streaming services, and announced that their fifth album Always Happy to Explode would be released on September 20, 2024.

== Discography ==
- Snake's Got a Leg LP (2005) Global Symphonic
- Sunset Rubdown EP (2006) Global Symphonic
- Shut Up I Am Dreaming LP (2006) Absolutely Kosher
- Random Spirit Lover LP (2007) Jagjaguwar
- Sunset Rubdown Introducing Moonface EP (2009) Aagoo Records
- Dragonslayer LP (2009) Jagjaguwar
- Always Happy to Explode LP (2024) Pronounced Kroog

== Personnel ==
While all members of Sunset Rubdown resided in Montreal, Quebec, at the time of the band's formation, all were transplants from other parts of Canada. Spencer Krug, Michael Doerksen and Jordan Robson-Cramer are originally from British Columbia, with Camilla Wynne originally from Alberta. Nicholas Merz, who joined the band after their 2022 reunion, is originally from Washington State.

- Spencer Krug - vocals, keys, guitar, kick drum
- Camilla Wynne - vocals, percussion, keyboards
- Michael Doerksen - guitar, bass, synthesizers, drums, vocals
- Jordan Robson-Cramer - drums, guitar, keyboards
- Nicholas Merz - bass, drums, vocals
