= Sunset Rubdown (EP) =

EP by Sunset Rubdown
- Released: January 2006
- Recorded: 2005
- Genre: Indie rock
- Length: 14:25
- Label: Global Symphonic

Sunset Rubdown chronology
Snake's Got a Leg (2005)	Sunset Rubdown (2006)	Shut Up I Am Dreaming (2006)

Professional ratings
Review scores
Source	Rating
Pitchfork Media	(7.8/10)

Sunset Rubdown is an EP by Sunset Rubdown. It was released in January 2006 on the Global Symphonic label. Following the release of Spencer Krug's solo album Snake's Got a Leg, Sunset Rubdown acquired three new band members. Before their first collaborative release, Shut Up I Am Dreaming, Krug released Sunset Rubdown which consisted of his more solo material.

== Track listing ==
1. "Three Colours" – 2:39
2. "Jason Believe Me, You Can't Trust Your Dreams" – 3:14 (extra vocals by Camilla Wynn Ingr)
3. "A Day in the Graveyard" – 2:27
4. "A Day in the Graveyard II" – 2:16
5. "Three Colours II" – 3:49

All songs written and recorded by Spencer Krug.

== Credits ==
- Mastered by Harris Newman at Greymarket Mastering
- Cover art by Matt Shane
