= Snake's Got a Leg =

Studio album by Sunset Rubdown
- Released: July 2005
- Recorded: 2001–2004
- Genre: Indie rock
- Length: 35:05
- Label: Global Symphonic

Sunset Rubdown chronology
Snake's Got a Leg (2005)	Sunset Rubdown (2006)

Professional ratings
Review scores
Source	Rating
Pitchfork Media	(5.1/10)

Snake's Got a Leg is the debut album by Sunset Rubdown. It was released in July 2005 on the Global Symphonic label. Most of the material on the album was recorded by Spencer Krug using a cheap microphone connected to a standard PC in his bedroom. The songs were compiled from five different EPs, each in a different genre.

== Track listing ==
1. "The Dust You Kick Up Is Too Fine" – 0:59
2. "Snake's Got a Leg" – 4:01
3. "I'll Believe in Anything, You'll Believe in Anything" – 4:48
4. "Hey You Handsome Vulture" – 1:34
5. "Hope You Don't Stoop to Dirty Words" – 4:10
6. "Hope You Don't Stoop to Dirty Words II" – 2:46
7. "Cecil's Bells" – 1:44
8. "I Know the Weight of Your Throat" – 2:50
9. "Sol's Song" – 4:03
10. "Stadiums and Shrines" – 2:59
11. "Snake's Got a Leg II" – 3:51
12. "Portrait of a Shiny Metal Little Boy" – 1:20

All songs written and recorded by Spencer Krug (except tracks 3, 5, and 11 were recorded by Arlen Thompson)

== Credits ==
- Banjo and harmonica by Paul Sischy
- Cover art by Spencer Krug
