= Breakglass Studio =

Music recording studio in Montreal, Canada

Coordinates: 45°32′4″N 73°37′12″W

Breakglass Studios is a Canadian analogue and digital recording studio established in 2005. Co-founded by producer Dave Smith and Jace Lasek, the 5,000-square-foot (460 m^{2}) studio space is located in the Le Plateau-Mont-Royal area of Montreal, Quebec. Since its inception, the studio has had a third partner in James Benjamin.

Local and international bands have recorded there, such as The Besnard Lakes, Les Breastfeeders, Bionic, Holy Fuck, Islands, Patrick Watson, Stars, Sunset Rubdown, Human Human, Dead Messenger, The Unicorns, Voilà!, Wintersleep, Wolf Parade, Purity Ring, The Annoying, The Loodies and The World Provider.

Patrick Watson's album, Close to Paradise, recorded at Breakglass Studio, was awarded the Polaris Music Prize in 2007.

Breakglass has a collection of vintage and new equipment. Available is a 1968 Neve Pre 80 Series input console. Originally built by Rupert Neve and refurbished by Hutch at Manley in 1994 (recapped, rewired, functionally upgraded), it is the first 16-buss Neve console ever produced. In 2012, Breakglass opened up a second mixing and tracking suite featuring an SSL 9080J console.
