= Jordan Robson-Cramer =

Canadian multi-instrumentalist musician

Magic Weapon
- Origin: Montreal, Quebec, Canada
- Genre: Indie rock
- Years active: 2005–2009
- Members: Jordan Robson-Cramer; Rory Seydel
- Past members: Mathieu Malouf; Matt Shane
- Website: Magic Weapon

Jordan Robson-Cramer is a Canadian multi-instrumentalist musician based in Montreal, Quebec. He was the founder and front man of the band Magic Weapon, and former member of the bands Miracle Fortress. He is also an original member of the art rock band Sunset Rubdown.

== Early life and education ==
Robson-Cramer was born in Winnipeg, Manitoba, and grew up in Victoria, British Columbia, where he graduated from high school. He resides in Montreal, Quebec where he also is owner of Phonopolis Records. JRC survives his late father, Garth W. Cramer (aged 70); deceased since Jan. 20th, 2025.

== Career ==
Robson-Cramer moved to Montreal in 2004. The indie rock band Magic Weapon was formed in 2005 when Robson-Cramer joined forces with Mathieu Malouf. Robson-Cramer, a fellow member of the band Miracle Fortress. A self-titled EP Magic Weapon was recorded and released in October 2006. Malouf left the band later that year; Matt Shane of Think About Life became Magic Weapon's drummer, and Rory Seydel of Shapes and Sizes joined on guitar in 2007. At this point all of the members were former Victorians who had moved to Montreal. They recorded Residue Hymns at Breakglass Studios in Montreal with Dave Smith. The band perform in Toronto that year.

When Graham Van Pelt expanded his solo project Miracle Fortress into a band in order to perform live shows, Robson-Cramer became the band's drummer. The band made a cross-Canada tour in 2007. In 2006, Robson-Cramer became drummer, guitarist and keyboardist for Montreal's Sunset Rubdown; He recorded with the band on their album Shut up, I'm Dreaming and on 2007's Random Spirit Lover.

Robson-Cramer left Miracle Fortress in early 2008.

Not long after the release of Residue Hymns, Jordan Robson-Cramer disbanded Magic Weapon. Robson-Cramer went on to start a new project called Ancient Kids, through which he released an 8-track EP entitled Odd City in January 2011. He remained the drummer and guitarist for Sunset Rubdown, which reunited in 2023 following a 14-year hiatus.

== Affiliated musicians ==
- Jordan Robson-Cramer: keyboard, guitar, vocals
- Rory Seydel: guitar
- Matt Shane: drums
- Spencer Krug: vocals

== Discography ==
- Magic Weapon EP (2006) self-released
- Residue Hymns EP (2007) self-released
