= Alexei Perry =

Canadian writer and musician

Alexei Perry Cox
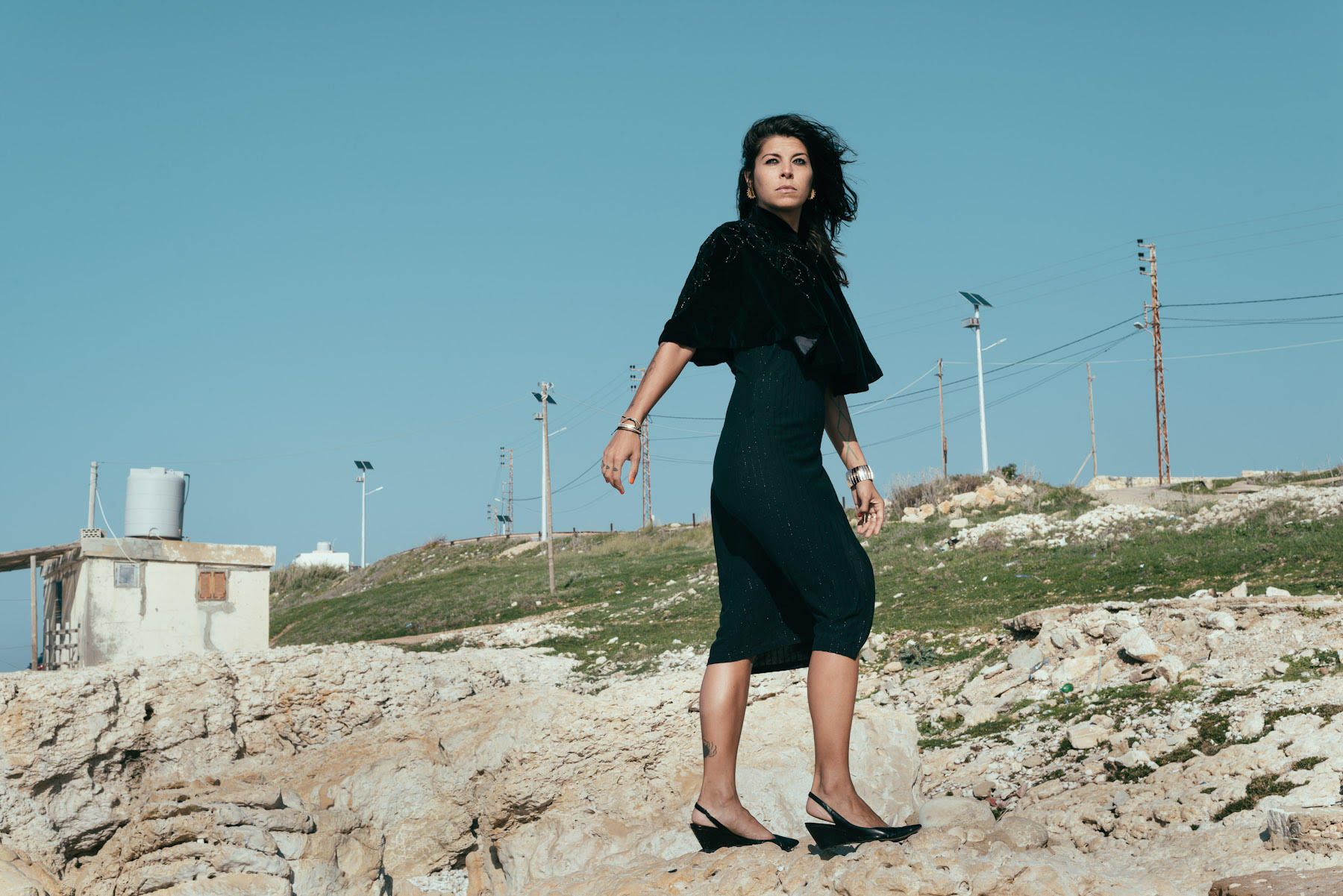

Background information
- Genres: fiction, poetry, music
- Occupations: writer, musician
- Years active: 2005–present
- Label: Sub Pop
- Formerly of: Handsome Furs
- Website: www.subpop.com/artists/handsome_furs

Alexei Perry Cox is a Canadian writer and musician.

== Overview ==
Perry Cox is a musician and poet. Under Her is her first collection of poetry, coming out with Insomniac Press. It was largely written in Lebanon.

== Published writing ==
2010	In Conversation with Jamie Stewart	The Beijinger	Beijing, China
2015	Under Her	Insomniac Press	Toronto, ON

== Videography ==
2007	Creative Direction, actor	Music Video – Dumb Animals	Directed by Panos Cosmatos – Vancouver, BC
2007	Creative Direction, actor	Music Video – Cannot Get Started	Directed by Matt Moroz – Montreal, QC
2009	Script Development, Creative Direction, actor	Music Video – I'm Confused	Directed by Scott Coffey – Portland, OR
2009	Research, filming and narration for series	CNN documentary series Indie Asia, On Tour with the Handsome Furs	
2011	Actor	Music Video – What About Us?	Directed by Scott Coffey – Portland, OR

== Art design and layout ==
2005 – Present	Subpop Records – Seattle, WA	Plague Park 2007, Face Control 2009, Sound Kapital 2011

== Discography ==
=== Handsome Furs ===
- Plague Park (2007) Sub Pop
- Face Control (2009) Sub Pop
- Sound Kapital (2011) Sub Pop

== Award nominations ==
2009	Polaris Music Prize	Longlist	Face Control
2010	Juno Award	Alternative Album of the Year	Face Control
2010	Independent Music Awards	Best Duo/Group	Face Control
