= Wolf Parade =

Canadian indie rock band

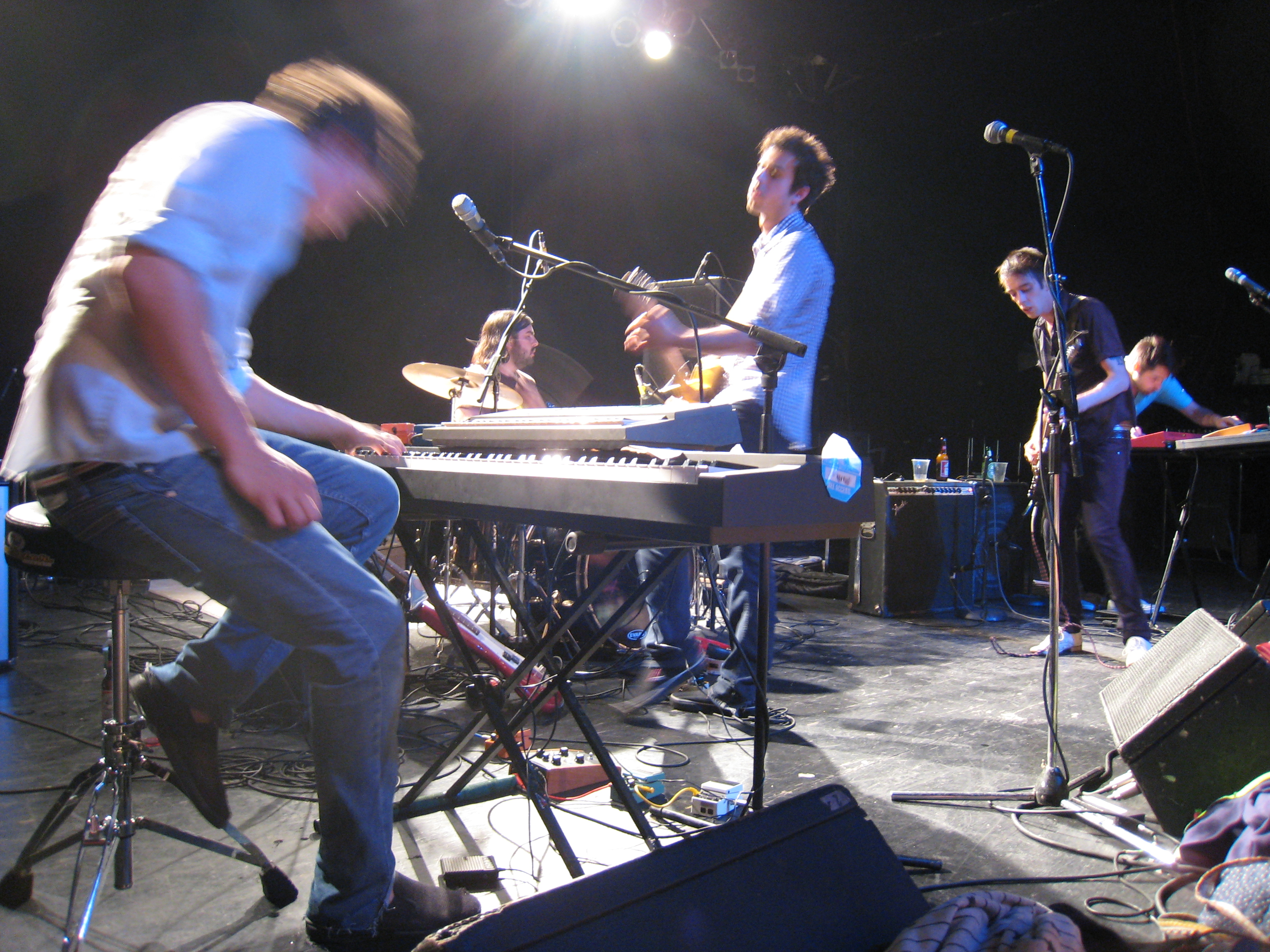
- Wolf Parade at the Theater of the Living Arts in Philadelphia on August 20, 2007

Background information
- Origin: Montreal, Quebec, Canada
- Genres: Indie rock, post-punk revival
- Years active: 2003–2011, 2016–present
- Label: Sub Pop
- Spinoff of: Frog Eyes
- Members: Spencer Krug; Dan Boeckner; Arlen Thompson
- Past members: Dante DeCaro; Hadji Bakara

Wolf Parade is a Canadian indie rock band formed in Montreal, in 2003. The band consists of Spencer Krug (vocals, keyboards), Dan Boeckner (vocals, guitar) and Arlen Thompson (drums). During live performances, the band are currently joined by Arcade Fire's Tim Kingsbury on various instruments. Multi-instrumentalist Dante DeCaro and synth-player Hadji Bakara are both recurring former members of the band.

The band released three full-length albums – Apologies to the Queen Mary (2005), At Mount Zoomer (2008) and Expo 86 (2010) – before taking a five-year hiatus in 2011. They announced their return in 2016, releasing a self-titled EP in May of that year, and a fourth studio album, Cry Cry Cry, in October 2017. Their fifth studio album, Thin Mind, was released on January 24, 2020.

== History ==
=== 2003–2005: Formation and early work ===
Wolf Parade began in April 2003, when former Frog Eyes member Spencer Krug was offered a gig by Grenadine Records' Alex Megelas. With only a three-week deadline to form a band, Krug contacted a fellow Canadian guitarist Dan Boeckner (formerly of British Columbia band Atlas Strategic) and began writing songs in Krug's apartment. Initially using a drum machine for their rhythm section played through computer speakers, Krug later invited Arlen Thompson to the lineup as the drummer; however, the newly formed trio rehearsed as a full band only the day before their first show. During the tour, Wolf Parade recorded and released their self-titled debut EP (also known as their 4 Song EP).

In September 2003, Hadji Bakara joined Wolf Parade, contributing his synthesizer and sound manipulation skills to the lineup. By the summer of 2004 the band released its second independent, self-titled EP, commonly referred to as the 6 Song EP.

In September 2004, the band traveled to Portland, Oregon to record with Modest Mouse's Isaac Brock. Brock had recently signed the band to Sub Pop when he was an A&R man for the label at the time. He had known Dan Boeckner from his days in Atlas Strategic, who had toured with Modest Mouse and were offered a Sub Pop signing just before the band split up. Wolf Parade spent two and a half weeks working 14-hour days in Portland. After some remixing, the band returned to Montreal to finish recording. The album was scheduled for a May release, but then pushed back. On its new record label, the band released its first widely distributed EP, Wolf Parade, in July 2005.

=== 2005–2008: Apologies to the Queen Mary and At Mount Zoomer ===
In September 2005, the band's debut album Apologies to the Queen Mary was released on Sub Pop Records to critical acclaim, earning a 2006 Polaris Music Prize nomination.

Dante DeCaro (formerly of Hot Hot Heat) joined sometime in 2005 as a second guitarist and percussionist. In 2008, an arrangement by Kenji Fusé of the Wolf Parade song "I'll Believe in Anything" for full symphony orchestra received a reading by the Victoria Symphony.

The band's second album, At Mount Zoomer, followed in June 2008. An on-stage announcement in November 2008 that Dante DeCaro would no longer be playing with the band was later revealed to have been a joke. Hadji Bakara left the band in 2008 to pursue an academic career in literature.

=== 2009–2015: Expo 86 and indefinite hiatus ===
Wolf Parade reconvened in November 2009 to begin work on their third album, Expo 86. In an interview with Exclaim! magazine, Dan Boeckner stated that the album may be released as a double album or as an LP and an EP, given the sheer number of quality songs to come out of the sessions. The five members realized they had all been at Vancouver's World Fair in the same week when they were kids, which is how the album got its name. The album was produced by Howard Bilerman and was released in the United States on June 29, 2010.

In 2010, the song "Shine a Light" from Apologies to the Queen Mary appeared in the "Criminal Minds" episode "The Fight".

Wolf Parade kicked off their 2010 North American tour in Montreal. Following the tour, the band announced it would go on indefinite hiatus after playing a small number of shows in 2011, including the Sasquatch! Music Festival.

=== 2016–2019: Reunion, Cry Cry Cry and DeCaro's departure ===
On January 14, 2016, Wolf Parade updated their website adding "2016" and launched new Twitter and Instagram pages, indicating the band's return from hiatus. The following day, they announced a series of concert dates for later that year, and that they had been working on new music. On October 6, 2017, the band released their fourth album titled Cry Cry Cry.

On February 4, 2019, Wolf Parade announced that Dante DeCaro had decided to leave the band and that they would carry on touring and composing as a trio.

=== 2020–2024: Thin Mind and Bakara's return ===
Wolf Parade released their fifth studio album, Thin Mind, on January 24, 2020. The album was their first to be released as a three-piece.

In April 2022, the band announced a series of shows where they would perform Apologies to the Queen Mary in its entirety. The band also confirmed that Bakara would return for the tour, marking his first shows with Wolf Parade in fourteen years. Bakara departed from the band again following the tour's completion.

Throughout 2022 and 2025, Boeckner toured with Arcade Fire as a session musician and contributed to the recording process of the band's seventh studio album, Pink Elephant (2025). In 2022, Spencer Krug reunited his art rock band Sunset Rubdown after a thirteen year hiatus. The band recorded and released their fifth studio album, Always Happy to Explode, in 2024.

=== 2025–present: Renewed success ===
In March 2025, the band embarked on a short seven-date Canadian tour, with Arcade Fire's Tim Kingsbury joining the core three-piece of Krug, Boeckner and Thompson. Kingsbury had previously contributed to the recording of the band's debut album, Apologies to the Queen Mary (2005), and had briefly toured with the band in 2005.

In December 2025, Wolf Parade's song "I'll Believe in Anything" went viral for its use in an episode of the same name of the Crave TV hockey romance Heated Rivalry. The episode, the fifth of season one of the series, aired on December 19, 2025, and by December 27, plays on Spotify were reported to have increased by 2658%. The song's continued success resulted in it peaking at number four on Billboard’s Alternative Digital Song Sales chart and at number seven on Billboard’s Rock Digital Song Sales.

Reflecting on the band's continued success in 2026, Boeckner stated: "As a musician, I don’t think there’s anything better you can ask for, really, than to have like a moment in the zeitgeist but also a moment that reinforces the value of your career. It’s really interesting to see what [other songs] people have grabbed onto. "Fine Young Cannibals" is, I think, our second most-streamed track, and we put it back in the setlist, and people were going bananas."

On May 15 2026, Spencer Krug released his third solo album, Same Fangs, which will be accompanied by a solo piano tour. As of 2026, Wolf Parade are currently recording new material between tours.

== Members ==
Current members

- Spencer Krug – vocals, keyboards, synthesizers (2003–2011, 2016–present)
- Dan Boeckner – vocals, guitar (2003–2011, 2016–present)
- Arlen Thompson – drums (2003–2011, 2016–present)

Current touring members

- Tim Kingsbury – bass guitar, guitar, synthesizers (2005; 2025–present)

Former members

- Dante DeCaro - bass guitar, guitar, percussion, keyboards (2005–2011, 2016–2019)
- Hadji Bakara – synthesizers (2003–2008, 2022)

== Other projects ==
Wolf Parade has been referred to as a "supergroup in reverse", as the members have achieved success with numerous projects formed after Wolf Parade. Additionally, Dante DeCaro's previous band Hot Hot Heat had received acclaim for their first album, Make Up the Breakdown, prior to his departure. Below is a partial list of the members' other projects:

- Spencer Krug releases solo music under the name of Moonface and is the lead singer of the rock band Sunset Rubdown. He was previously in Frog Eyes, Fifths of Seven, and Swan Lake. Beginning in 2021, Krug began recording albums under his own name and on his own label Pronounced Kroog. As of June 2022, he has released two albums in this manner: Fading Graffiti and Twenty Twenty Twenty Twenty One.
- Arlen Thompson played drums on the Arcade Fire song "Wake Up". He also helped produce both Handsome Furs albums at his Mount Zoomer recording studio in Montreal. He is a member of the side project formerly known as Treasure Hunt, whose name was changed to avoid confusion with the moniker of experimental musician Myles Byrne-Dunhill.
- Dan Boeckner was formerly a member of the indie rock duo Handsome Furs which he formed with his now ex-wife, Alexei Perry. Before joining Wolf Parade, Boeckner played in Atlas Strategic. He would go on to play in the bands Divine Fits and Operators. In 2022, Boeckner joined Arcade Fire in a session capacity, touring with the band in support of the band's sixth studio album, WE, and contributed to the recording process of their seventh album, Pink Elephant (2025).
- Dante DeCaro fronts a project called Johnny and the Moon. Prior to Wolf Parade, DeCaro played in Hot Hot Heat.
- Hadji Bakara is a member of the synth-bass-dance-rap production team Megasoid, along with Speakerbruiser Rob, formerly Sixtoo. He also helped with treatments on "Black Mirror", "Neon Bible" and "My Body Is a Cage" off Arcade Fire's album Neon Bible.

== Discography ==
=== Studio albums ===
List of studio albums, with selected chart positions
Title	Details	Peak chart positions		
Title	Details	CAN	US	US Indie
Apologies to the Queen Mary	Released: September 27, 2005; Label: Sub Pop	—	158	12
At Mount Zoomer	Released: June 17, 2008; Label: Sub Pop	16	45	4
Expo 86	Released: June 29, 2010; Label: Sub Pop	24	48	6
Cry Cry Cry	Released: October 6, 2017; Label: Sub Pop	82	— (Note: "Cry Cry Cry" did not enter the Billboard 200 chart, but peaked at number 54 on the Album Sales chart.)	12
Thin Mind	Released: January 24, 2020; Label: Sub Pop	—	— (Note: "Thin Mind" did not enter the Billboard 200 chart, but peaked at number 31 on the Album Sales chart.)	—

=== EPs ===
- Wolf Parade (2003) Self-released
- Wolf Parade (2004) Self-released
- Wolf Parade (2005) Sub Pop
- Wolf Parade (2016) Self-released

=== Singles ===
==== Charted and certified singles ====
Title	Year	Peak chart positions			Certifications	Album or EP
Title	Year	CAN Sales	US Alt. Sales	US Rock Sales	Certifications	Album or EP
"I'll Believe in Anything"	2005	20	4	7	RIAA: Gold	Apologies to the Queen Mary

==== Other singles ====
- "Modern World" (2006, Sub Pop)
- "Shine a Light" (2006, Sub Pop)
- "Call it a Ritual" (2008, Sub Pop)
- "Language City" (2008, Sub Pop)
- "Semi-Precious Stone" / "Agents of Love" (2010, Sub Pop)
- "Valley Boy" (2017, Sub Pop)
- "You're Dreaming" (2017, Sub Pop)
- "King of Piss and Paper" (2017, Sub Pop)
- "Against the Day" (2019, Sub Pop)
- "Forest Green" (2019, Sub Pop)
- "Julia Take Your Man Home" (2020, Sub Pop)

=== Music videos ===
- "Julia Take Your Man Home" (2020)
- "Against the Day" (2019)
- "King of Piss and Paper/Artificial Life" (2017)
- "You're Dreaming" (2017)
- "Valley Boy" (2017)
- "Yulia" (2010)
- "Modern World" (2006)
- "I'll Believe in Anything" (2005)
- "Shine a Light" (2005)

=== Compilation appearances ===
- "Claxxon's Lament" on The Believer 2005 Music Issue CD
