= Let Me In =

Let Me In may refer to:

== Fiction ==
- Let Me In (film), a 2010 American-British adaptation of the 2004 novel Let the Right One In by John Ajvide Lindqvist
  - Let Me In: Crossroads, a limited comic book series, a prequel based on the film, by Marc Andreyko
- Let Me In, a 2016 film produced by and starring Alicia Keys

== Music ==
=== Albums ===
- Let Me In (Chely Wright album) or the title song, 1997
- Let Me In (Johnny Winter album) or the title song, 1991
- Let Me In (soundtrack), from the 2010 film
- Let Me In, an EP by Hollyn Cole, or the title song, 2016

=== Songs ===
- "Let Me In" (Eddie Money song), 1989
- "Let Me In" (Hot Hot Heat song), 2007
- "Let Me In" (The Osmonds song), 1973
- "Let Me In" (The Sensations song), 1961
- "Let Me In" (Tom Dice song), 2013
- "Let Me In" (Young Buck song), 2004
- "Let Me In", by Beatsteaks from Living Targets, 2002
- "Let Me In", by Derringer from Derringer, 1976
- "Let Me In", by Exo from Exist, 2023
- "Let Me In", by Eyes Set to Kill from Broken Frames, 2010
- "Let Me In", by H.E.R. from H.E.R., 2017
- "Let Me In", by Kleerup, 2014
- "Let Me In", by Kristine W from Land of the Living, 1996
- "Let Me In", by Loona from HaSeul, 2016
- "Let Me In", by Mike Francis, 1984
- "Let Me In", by Moka Only and Def3 from Dog River, 2007
- "Let Me In", by R.E.M. from Monster, 1994
- "Let Me In (20 Cube)", by Enhypen from Border: Day One, 2020
