= Jack Blocker =

American singer and musician (born 1998)

- by Lucy Bates

Background information
- Born: Jackson Forest Blocker; June 8, 1998 (age 28); Richardson, Texas, U.S.
- Genre: Country
- Occupations: Singer, musician
- Years active: 2022–present
- Label: Thirty Tigers
- Spouse: Georgia Blocker (m. 2021)
- Website: jackblocker.com

Jack Forest Blocker (born June 8, 1998) is an American country singer-songwriter and musician from Richardson, Texas, known for his recordings, including a 2026 album on Sony Music's Thirty Tigers label, and his touring career. He came to prominence as a season 22 American Idol finalist, having been the first contestant to initially receive a majority of two "no" votes from the judges (before Lionel Richie reversed his decision) and subsequently reach the finals. Based in Nashville, Blocker released his debut album, The Land on Most High, in September 2025, and has his next album set for a November 2026 release on Thirty Tigers.

== Early life and career ==
Blocker was born on June 8, 1998 in Richardson, Texas to Truman and Caryn Blocker. He has three sisters. Growing up in Dallas, his parents described him as a shy but adventurous child, who was equally interested in athletics and art. He was inspired to pursue music from listening to country artists and worship songs. He went to high school at Trinity Christian Academy in Addison, Texas, where he met his future wife, Georgia. He is a self-taught guitarist who learned how to play from watching YouTube instructional videos.

Prior to American Idol, Blocker was in a pop band called Rightfield, which he formed while attending the University of Arkansas in Fayetteville. He majored in communications. In 2022, he, his wife, and his bandmate Reed Hoelscher, moved to Nashville to pursue music as a full-time career. While Blocker continued recording with his band, simultaneously he became a solo artist and began writing songs. He describes the move as a "culture shock".

== American Idol ==
Blocker auditioned in Nashville with his original song, "I Was Wrong". Luke Bryan voted "yes", but Katy Perry voted "no" citing that the faces he pulled while singing were distracting. Lionel Richie was on the fence, but decided to vote "no". After Blocker left the room, he questioned his decision, while the crew lambasted the judges. Richie took a vote and the entire crew plus Ryan Seacrest voted to bring Blocker back in for a "yes", after which they gave him a golden ticket to Hollywood.

In Hollywood, Blocker practiced singing in the mirror to subdue his facial contortions that initially turned off Perry. He sang "Your Cheatin' Heart" by Hank Williams Sr. and advanced onto the next round. After singing "You Should've Seen the Other Guy" by Nathaniel Rateliff, the judges brought a portion of the crew out to announce along with them that he made the Top 24.

For his Top 24 performance at Disney's Aulani resort in Hawaii, Blocker sang "Rainbow" by Kacey Musgraves and was lauded by the judges (which included guest mentor Jelly Roll). Richie declared Blocker was "a storyteller's storyteller". Blocker advanced to the Top 20 and subsequently the Top 14, singing "You Don't Mess Around with Jim" by Jim Croce for the voting round and "Feeling Whitney" by Post Malone as his "victory song".

Blocker earned unanimous praise from the judges for his Top 14 performance of Bob Dylan's "Don't Think Twice, It's All Right". He continued to earn plaudits for his Top 12 and Top 10 performances of "Blinding Lights" by The Weeknd and "Believe" by Cher, respectively. Perry praised Blocker for "taking a dance song that is so Cher and making it Jack Blocker". For his solo performance on the Judges' Contest night (Top 8), Blocker performed without his guitar for the first time. He sang "Always on My Mind", which was chosen for him by Perry, and was lauded by all three judges. He and Emmy Russell (Loretta Lynn's granddaughter) also sang a duet of "Hello" as a tribute to Richie.

He continued to garner further acclamation from the judges in the successive weeks. He sang "Long Tall Sally" by Little Richard and "One and Only" by Adele in the Top 7. The following week in the Top 5, he was lauded for his performances of "Nobody's Fool" by Brad Paisley and "Space Oddity" by David Bowie. After these performances, he was announced as part of the Final 3 alongside Abi Carter and Will Moseley. In the finale, he sang "I'll Be There for You" by Bon Jovi and "All My Ex's Live in Texas" by George Strait. Following these performances, Blocker was eliminated in third place. (Carter was eventually declared the winner of season 22.) After his elimination, Blocker also performed a duet with Perry on her song "What Makes a Woman", in which she allowed him to write his own verse. His self-penned single "All of Yours (To Give All of Mine)", which he was unable to perform due to being eliminated prior to the final round, was released on May 17, 2024.

=== Performances and results ===
American Idol season 22 performances and results
Episode	Theme	Song choice	Original artist	Order number	Result
Auditions Episode No. 1	N/A	"I Was Wrong"	Jack Blocker	N/A	~~Eliminated~~; Saved (Note: Initially, Luke Bryan voted yes, while Katy Perry and Lionel Richie voted no. However, upon a revote, Richie's vote became a "yes", thereby becoming the majority vote and sending Blocker to Hollywood.)
Hollywood Round	N/A	"Your Cheatin' Heart"	Hank Williams	N/A	Advanced
Showstoppers/Green Mile	N/A	"You Should've Seen the Other Guy"	Nathaniel Rateliff	N/A	Advanced
Top 24 – Monday, Part 2 (April 8)	Contestant's Choice	"Rainbow"	Kacey Musgraves	8	Advanced
Top 20 (April 14 – Voting)	Contestant's Choice	"You Don't Mess Around with Jim"	Jim Croce	1	Advanced
Top 20 (April 15 – Results)	Victory/WildCard Songs	"Feeling Whitney"	Post Malone	4	Advanced
Top 14 (April 21)	Rock & Roll Hall of Fame	"Don't Think Twice, It's All Right"	Bob Dylan	9	Advanced
Top 12 (April 22)	Billboard No. 1 Hits	"Blinding Lights"	The Weeknd	6	Advanced
Top 10 (April 28)	Year you Were Born	"Believe"	Cher	2	Advanced
Top 8 (April 29)	Judges' Song Contest	"Hello" (w/ Emmy Russell)	Lionel Richie	3	Advanced
Top 8 (April 29)	Judges' Song Contest	"Always on My Mind" (selected by Katy Perry)	Gwen McCrae	5	Advanced
Top 7 (May 5)	Dance Songs / Adele	"Long Tall Sally (The Thing)"	Little Richard	1	Advanced
Top 7 (May 5)	Dance Songs / Adele	"One and Only"	Adele	9	Advanced
Top 5 (May 12)	Disney Night	"Nobody's Fool" (from Cars 2)	Brad Paisley	4	Advanced
Top 5 (May 12)	Disney Night	"Space Oddity" (from Indiana Jones and the Dial of Destiny)	David Bowie	9	Advanced
Top 3 – Grand Finale (May 18)	Bon Jovi / Hometown Dedication / Winner's Single	"I'll Be There for You"	Bon Jovi	2	3rd place
Top 3 – Grand Finale (May 18)	Bon Jovi / Hometown Dedication / Winner's Single	"All My Ex's Live in Texas"	George Strait	5	3rd place

== Recording career ==
Blocker released his debut album, The Land on Most High, in September 2025 on his own label, Elbow Grease Records, produced by Patrick Lyons.

His second album, Big Jefe, also produced by Patrick Lyons, is slated for a November 6, 2026 release on Sony Music's Thirty Tigers label. Us Magazine named it one of the Most Anticipated Albums of Fall 2026. The songs revolve around the character "Big Jefe" that Blocker created when he wrote the title track, a concept partly inspired by the Willie Nelson concept album Red Headed Stranger and by storytelling singer-songwriters such as Marty Robbins and Townes Van Zandt. The single "Brand New Name" (August 28, 2026) reintroduced the Big Jefe character in advance of the album release.

== Touring ==
Blocker is supporting his 2026 album Big Jefe with a fall U.S. tour that began in Nashville on September 16, 2026. He opened for Molly Tuttle at dates in 2025 and 2026 as well as for Drake Milligan, Justin Wells, Pat Green, Shane Smith and The Saints, and Hayes Carll.
