= Scenes One Through Thirteen =

Compilation album by Hot Hot Heat
- Released: 2002
- Genre: Experimental rock Post-hardcore
- Length: 38:09
- Label: OHEV Records

Hot Hot Heat chronology
Scenes One Through Thirteen (2002)	Knock Knock Knock (2002)

Professional ratings
Review scores
Source	Rating
AllMusic	3/5 stars
Pitchfork Media	4.7/10

Scenes One Through Thirteen is a compilation of songs by Hot Hot Heat, released on OHEV Records on January 1, 2002. It catalogs every Hot Hot Heat single along with their other early releases, all recorded before the band was signed to Sub Pop in late 2001.

Tracks 1–8 were recorded by Colin Stewart and Josh Wells at the Hive.
Tracks 9–13 were recorded by Neil Cooke-Dallin at Keating X Road.

== Track listing ==
1. "Keep My Name Out of Your Mouth"
2. "Word to Water"
3. "Haircut Economics"
4. "The Case That They Gave Me"
5. "Paco Pena"
6. "Circus Maximus"
7. "I Blew a Fuse in My Personality"
8. "Tokyo Vogue"
9. "Fashion Fight Pause"
10. "Spelling Live Backwards"
11. "Matador at the Door"
12. "Tourist in Your Own Town"
13. "You're Ruining It for Everyone"

== Reception ==
Scenes One Through Thirteen received largely mixed reviews. Moreover, in a positive review of the band's 2005 album Elevator, Clayton Purdom of Cokemachineglow referred to the compilation as "embarrassing".
