= McCallum Theatre =

- Interactive map of McCallum Theatre
- Address: 73000 Fred Waring Drive; Palm Desert, California; United States
- Coordinates: 33°43′47″N 116°23′22″W
- Owner: Friends of the Cultural Center, Inc.
- Capacity: 1,127
- Type: Performing arts center

Construction
- Opened: January 1988
- Architects: Anthony and Langford/Architects

Website
- www.mccallumtheatre.com

The McCallum Theatre is a 1,127-seat theatre and concert venue located on the southern edge of the campus of College of the Desert in Palm Desert, California, US. It was built by and is operated by an independent non-profit corporation, Friends of the Cultural Center, Inc.

== History ==
McCallum Theatre Education, the theatre's educational outreach division, was founded in 1997. It offers arts literacy experiences for approximately 40,000 children, parents, and educators annually, both at the McCallum and in area classrooms. Participation has steadily increased and, this year, the McCallum will partner with 25 area schools, 303 classrooms, and more than 8,000 students, representing about 70 percent of valley schools. Close to 2,300 individual classroom workshops will be facilitated by McCallum Theatre Education teaching artists during the 2017–2018 season.

As a nonprofit organization, the McCallum is governed by a volunteer board of trustees with the fundraising assistance of The Muses & Patroness Circle, a women's leadership council that raises funds for the educational activities of the McCallum Theatre.

== Open Call talent competition ==
Abi Carter, the winner of season 22 of American Idol in 2024, was a five-time finalist in the talent contest. In 2016, she was also a winner (when 13 years old), with her mother, winning the "Best Vocal Act" that year.
