= No, Not Now =

Single by Hot Hot Heat

from the album Make Up the Breakdown
- B-side: "This Town"; "5 Times Out of 100 (Hrdvsion Remix)"
- Released: July 28, 2003
- Genre: Indie rock
- Length: 2:31
- Label: B-Unique Records
- Songwriters: Steve Bays, Dante DeCaro, Paul Hawley, Dustin Hawthorne

Hot Hot Heat singles chronology
"Bandages" (2003)	"No, Not Now" (2003)	"Talk to Me, Dance with Me" (2003)

"No, Not Now" is a song by Canadian indie rock band Hot Hot Heat and is taken from their first album, Make Up the Breakdown. The song was released in the UK as the second single from the album on July 28, 2003. It reached number 38 in the UK Singles Chart.
