= Doot-Doot =

Studio album by Freur
- Released: 1983
- Genres: New wave; synth-pop
- Length: 39:41
- Label: CBS
- Producers: Freur; John Hudson

Freur chronology
Doot-Doot (1983)	Get Us Out of Here (1986)

Singles from Doot-Doot
- 1. "Doot-Doot" Released: 1983; 2. "Matters of the Heart" Released: 1983; 3. "Runaway" Released: 1983; 4. "Riders in the Night" Released: 1984

Professional ratings
Review scores
Source	Rating
AllMusic	Doot-Doot
AllMusic	Get Us Out of Here/Doot Doot

Doot-Doot is the debut studio album by the Welsh new wave and synth-pop band Freur, released in 1983 by CBS Records. The cassette version of the album included four extra tracks. The lead single, "Doot-Doot", peaked at No. 59 on the UK Singles Chart and No. 17 in New Zealand. The song "Doot-Doot" has appeared in several films, including Let Me In (2010) and Vanilla Sky (2001).

== CD release ==
The album was unavailable on CD until it was reissued by Oglio Records in 1993 in the United States. The album has since been reissued twice in the United Kingdom, in 2000 by Columbia Records and subsequently in 2009 by Cherry Red Records as Get Us Out of Here/Doot-Doot – which includes both Freur albums on one CD.

== Track listing ==
All songs written and composed by Karl Hyde, Rick Smith and Alfie Thomas.

=== CBS Records LP: CBS 25522-1 ===
Side one
No.	Title	Length
1.	"Doot-Doot"	4:03
2.	"Runaway"	4:00
3.	"Riders in the Night"	5:40
4.	"Theme from the Film of the Same Name"	3:21
5.	"Tender Surrender"	3:02

Side two
No.	Title	Length
1.	"Matters of the Heart"	4:08
2.	"My Room"	3:27
3.	"Whispering"	4:10
4.	"Steam Machine"	2:56
5.	"All Too Much"	4:54

=== CBS Records Cassette: CBS 40-25522 ===
Doot-Doot: Side one
No.	Title	Length
1.	"Doot-Doot"	4:03
2.	"Runaway"	4:00
3.	"Riders in the Night"	5:40
4.	"Theme from the Film of the Same Name"	3:21
5.	"Tender Surrender"	3:02
6.	"Hold Me Mother (Extended Version)"	5:44
7.	"You're a Hoover (Extended Version)"	5:29

Doot-Doot: Side two
No.	Title	Length
1.	"Matters of the Heart"	4:08
2.	"My Room"	3:27
3.	"Whispering"	4:10
4.	"Steam Machine"	2:56
5.	"All Too Much"	4:54
6.	"Matters of the Heart (Extended Version)"	6:22
7.	"Doot-Doot (Extended Version)"	5:51

=== 1993 – Oglio Records CD: OGL 81566-2 ===
Doot-Doot
No.	Title	Length
1.	"Doot-Doot"	4:01
2.	"Runaway"	4:07
3.	"Riders in the Night"	5:42
4.	"Theme from the Film of the Same Name"	3:26
5.	"Tender Surrender"	3:06
6.	"Matters of the Heart"	4:09
7.	"My Room"	3:28
8.	"Whispering"	4:13
9.	"Steam Machine"	2:59
10.	"All Too Much"	4:56
11.	"Hey Ho Away We Go"	3:55
12.	"The Devil and Darkness (Kevin Whyte Mix)"	5:47
Total length:		49:50

=== 2000 – Columbia Records CD: 498247 2 ===
Doot-Doot
No.	Title	Length
1.	"Doot-Doot"	4:03
2.	"Runaway"	4:03
3.	"Riders in the Night"	5:37
4.	"Theme from the Film of the Same Name"	3:24
5.	"Tender Surrender"	3:00
6.	"Matters of the Heart"	4:01
7.	"My Room"	3:23
8.	"Whispering"	4:07
9.	"Steam Machine"	2:56
10.	"All Too Much"	4:53
11.	"Doot-Doot (Extended Version)"	6:05
12.	"Hold Me Mother (Extended Version)"	5:47
Total length:		51:21

=== 2009 – Cherry Red Records CD: CDM RED 419^{*} ===
Get Us Out of Here/Doot-Doot
No.	Title	Length
11.	"Doot-Doot"	4:03
12.	"Runaway"	4:04
13.	"Riders in the Night"	5:40
14.	"Theme from the Film of the Same Name"	3:25
15.	"Tender Surrender"	3:05
16.	"Matters of the Heart"	4:07
17.	"My Room"	3:26
18.	"Whispering"	4:10
19.	"Steam Machine"	2:58
20.	"All Too Much"	4:58
Total length:		39:57

^{*} Tracks 1–10 taken from the album Get Us Out of Here (1986).

== Personnel ==
Credits are adapted from the Doot-Doot liner notes.

Additional musicians

- Andy Sheppard – soprano saxophone and tenor saxophone on "Runaway"
- Pino Palladino – fretless bass and Chapman Stick on "Theme from the Film of the Same Name"

Production and artwork

- Freur and John Hudson – producer
- Freur and Alex Burak – producer "Doot-Doot"
- Freur – producer "Hold Me Mother"
- John Hudson – engineer
- Pat Stapley and John Hudson – engineer "Runaway"
- John Hudson and John Etchells – engineer "Tender Surrender" and "Steam Machine"
- Simon Smart and John Hudson – engineer "Matters of the Heart"
- John Hudson and Rob Parr – engineer "Hold Me Mother"
- Pete Suthers – electronic research development
- Recorded at Point Studios, Ridge Farm, Jam, Abbey Road and Mayfair
- Mixed at Mayfair
- Brian Griffin – front cover/inner sleeve photographs
- Simon Fowler – group photograph
