= Bandages (song) =

Single by Hot Hot Heat

from the album Make Up the Breakdown
- B-side: "Apt. 101"; "Move On"
- Released: March 23, 2003
- Genre: Indie rock
- Length: 3:32
- Label: B-Unique
- Songwriters: Steve Bays, Dante DeCaro, Paul Hawley, Dustin Hawthorne

Hot Hot Heat singles chronology
"Bandages" (2003)	"No, Not Now" (2003)

Music video
- "Bandages" on YouTube

"Bandages" is the debut single by Canadian indie rock band Hot Hot Heat, released in the UK and US on March 23, 2003. It is from their first album Make Up the Breakdown. The single reached number 25 in the UK. It was released as downloadable content for the Rock Band series on September 23, 2008.

== Music video ==
The video is based on the film Brazil, where the hero's mother goes through the same process of "plastic surgery" in order to look younger.

== Track listing ==
1. "Bandages" (radio edit) – 3:32
2. "Apt. 101" – 2:59
3. "Move On" – 3:33
