= Middle of Nowhere (song) =

Single by Hot Hot Heat

from the album Elevator
- B-side: "Pickin' It Up"
- Released: July 18, 2005
- Genre: Indie rock
- Length: 4:01
- Label: Sire Records
- Songwriters: Steve Bays, Dante DeCaro, Paul Hawley, Dustin Hawthorne
- Producer: Dave Sardy

Hot Hot Heat singles chronology
"Goodnight Goodnight" (2005)	"Middle of Nowhere" (2005)	"Christmas Day In the Sun" (2005)

Music video
- "Middle of Nowhere" on YouTube

"Middle of Nowhere" is a song by Canadian indie rock band Hot Hot Heat and is taken from their second album, Elevator. The song was released in the UK and US as the second single from Elevator on July 18, 2005.

The song reached No. 23 on the U.S. Modern Rock Tracks chart, as well as reaching a peak of No. 47 in the UK Singles Chart. The music video was directed by Marc Webb.

This song was featured in USA's show, Psych, in the tenth episode of season 1, entitled "From Earth to Starbucks". This song was also featured in The CW show, One Tree Hill, in episode 21 of season 3, entitled "Over the Hills and Far Away".

== Charts ==
=== Weekly charts ===
Weekly chart performance for "Middle of Nowhere"
Chart (2005)	Peak position
Canada Rock Top 30 (Radio & Records)	23
Scotland Singles (OCC)	50
UK Singles (OCC)	47
US Alternative Airplay (Billboard)	23

=== Year-end charts ===
Year-end chart performance for "Middle of Nowhere"
Chart (2005)	Position
US Modern Rock Tracks (Billboard)	75

== Release history ==
Release dates and formats for "Middle of Nowhere"
Region	Date	Format	Label(s)	Ref.
United States	September 20, 2005	Mainstream airplay	Reprise	
