= Hot Hot Heat =

Canadian indie rock band

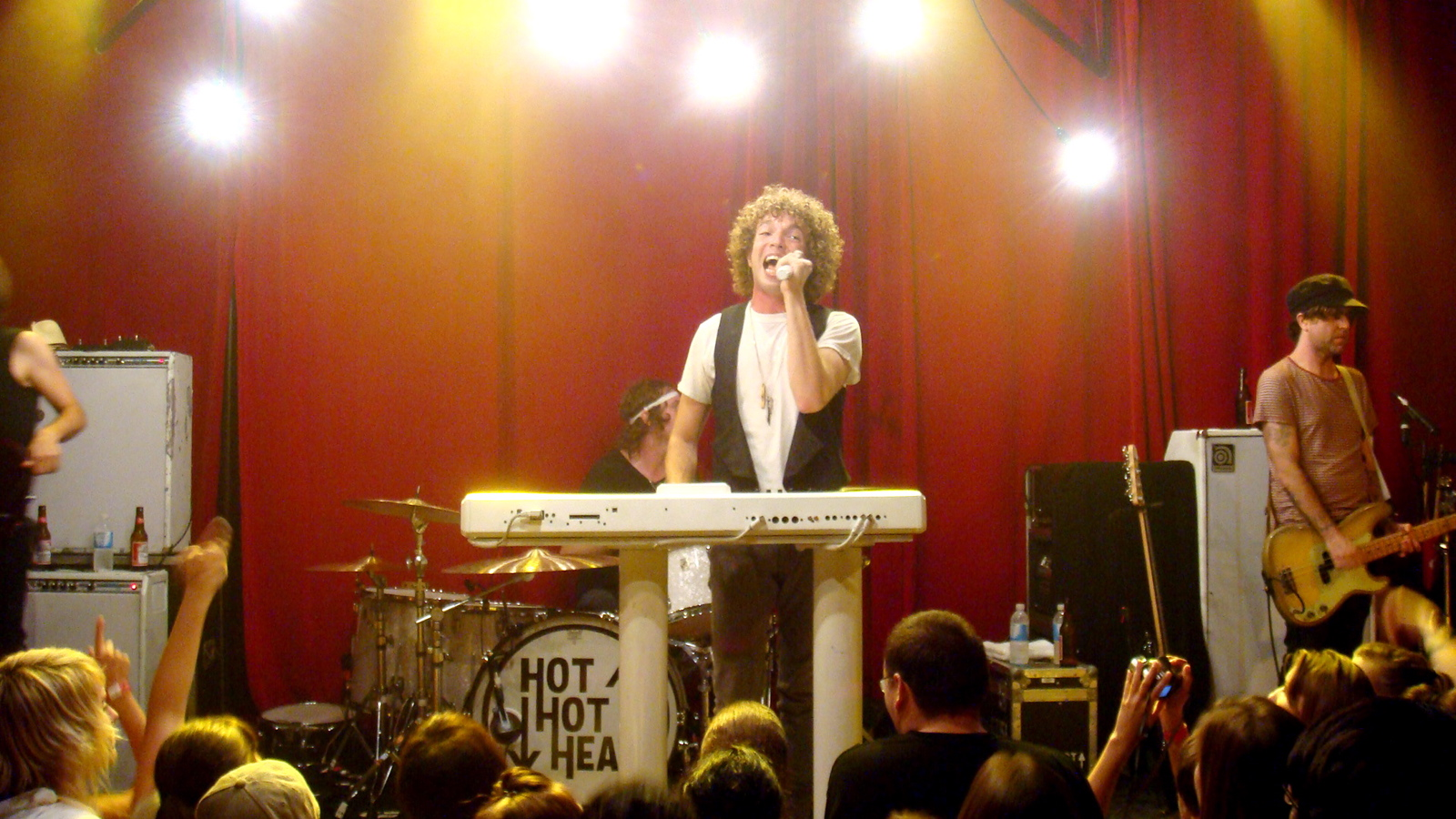
- Hot Hot Heat in 2007

Background information
- Origin: Victoria, British Columbia, Canada
- Genres: Alternative rock; indie rock; art punk; dance-punk; post-punk revival
- Years active: 1999–2016, 2023–2024
- Labels: Sub Pop; Ache; Dangerbird; Dine Alone; Sire; Warner Bros. Records
- Past members: Steve Bays; Paul Hawley; Dante DeCaro; Parker Bossley; Luke Paquin; Louis Hearn; Dustin Hawthorne; Matthew Marnik
- Website: hothotheat.com

Hot Hot Heat was a Canadian indie rock band from Victoria, British Columbia, formed in 1999. The band was signed to Seattle label Sub Pop in 2001 and Warner Records throughout the majority of their career.

The band has released five full-length albums to date, their first and critically acclaimed, Make Up the Breakdown (2002), Elevator (2005), Happiness Ltd. (2007), Future Breeds (2010) and their last before disbanding, Hot Hot Heat (2016). The band's style makes use of electronic and traditional instruments and has variously been categorized as dance-punk, post-punk revival, and art-punk.

After five years of scant activity following the touring cycle of Future Breeds in 2011, on March 13, 2016, Hot Hot Heat announced new music with a limited edition 7" record, "Nature of Things" which was released for April 16, 2016, in participation with Record Store Day that year. Preceding that release, on April 5, the group officially announced they had disbanded and would release their fifth and final self-titled album on June 24, 2016, via Kaw-Liga Records, with the album's lead single, "Kid Who Stays in the Picture" premiering alongside the announcement.

Following an eight-year hiatus, Hot Hot Heat reunited at the end of 2023, with the release of their comeback single, "Shock Me" on December 1, 2023. However, the reunion would be extremely short-lived following an announcement by the group on January 26, 2024, stating all intentions to release new material and subsequent live performances were effectively cancelled. The reasoning was further explained in part due to lead vocalist and primary songwriter Steve Bays no longer being able to commit to the group's plans.

== Career ==
Dustin Hawthorne, a drugstore clerk, and Steve Bays, a personal assistant, had been in many different bands together since 1995 and met Paul Hawley in 1998. In 1999, Hawley bought a Juno 6 keyboard and asked Bays to try playing it, as no one else knew how. Hawley took over the drums from Bays and Hawthorne played bass. Matthew Marnik, who was a friend of the band, sang vocals. The band's original sound can be considered electropunk and sasscore.

The band soon changed direction to a more melodic, pop-influenced style, losing Marnik and adding guitarist Dante DeCaro. Strongly influenced by the new wave sound of 1980s bands the Cure, XTC, the Clash, and Elvis Costello and the Attractions, the new lineup, with Bays on vocals, quickly released a series of 7" singles and toured extensively in Canada and the American Pacific Northwest, joining up with similarly styled indie rock bands such as Les Savy Fav, the French Kicks, Radio 4, Ima Robot, and Pretty Girls Make Graves, and opening for established Canadian rockers Sloan on a national tour.

The band's touring exposure attracted the interest of Seattle record label Sub Pop, who signed Hot Hot Heat in 2001, leading to the early 2002 release of EP Knock Knock Knock, produced in part by Chris Walla of Death Cab for Cutie. Although Hot Hot Heat got its start as a hardcore band, by the time it made contact with Sub Pop, its sound had mutated into what would soon be known as dance-punk. The band stood at the forefront of a movement that would explode on the indie rock scene within another year. That release was followed up quickly by the band's first full-length release, Make Up the Breakdown, produced by Nirvana and Soundgarden producer Jack Endino.

That album quickly found critical acclaim, and its singles "Bandages" and "Talk to Me, Dance With Me" received regular airplay on MTV and radio, including influential Los Angeles, California station KROQ-FM, on whose charts both reached No. 1.

However, their track "Bandages" was removed from radio in the UK, from the playlist at BBC Radio 1, in the light of the war in the Middle East. This was thought to have hindered its position at No. 25 in the UK charts. The track had been on the B list on the station, guaranteeing 15 plays a week and a potential audience of millions. It was removed because of a "prevalence of the word 'bandages' in the song", a spokesperson said. In 2002, the band signed with Warner in the U.S.

In 2003, the band re-released the 2001 album of tracks recorded prior to their Sub Pop recordings, Scenes One Through Thirteen, on the OHEV Records label. Reflecting the band's transition period between their original sound and the present, and thus very much unlike what fans had heard on Knock Knock Knock and Make Up the Breakdown.

In 2004, Make Up the Breakdown won "Favourite Album" at the Canadian Independent Music Awards by popular vote. Guitarist Dante DeCaro announced his departure from the band in October 2004, but stayed to complete their next album, and in 2005 joined Montreal band Wolf Parade. That album, Elevator was the band's major label debut and was released commercially by Warner Bros. In April 2005, Dante handed guitar duties over to replacement Luke Paquin when the band started their 2005 tour. In June Elevator appeared in the top ten of the !earshot Campus and Community Radio chart.

In 2005, the band opened for Weezer and Foo Fighters on the "Foozer Tour".

Hot Hot Heat played an opening set for American synth rock group the Killers at Red Rocks Amphitheatre on May 17, 2007. However, the Killers were forced to pull out after three songs because lead singer Brandon Flowers was suffering from bronchitis.

The group's follow-up to Elevator and third studio album, Happiness Ltd., was released on September 11, 2007. In late March 2007, the band posted the song "Give Up?" on their Myspace page as a sample of the album, and it was released on iTunes as a single on May 15. A second single entitled "Let Me In" was released on July 16.

Hot Hot Heat toured in 2007 with Snow Patrol as their opening act on the U.S. leg of their summer tour. Their headlining tour of Germany, Canada and U.S. started September 3, 2007.

"Let Me In" debuted on KROQ-FM at number 8. On August 8, 2007, the music video for "Let Me In" premiered on Myspace Music. Also, on September 6, 2007, Hot Hot Heat posted their new album on their Myspace.

The band spent most of 2008/2009 recording and constructing their own studio. Experimenting with 5/4 disco grooves and electro loops, they went into the studio with producer/musician Ryan Dahle from Limblifter/Age of Electric awhile doing a brief Canadian tour opening for Bloc Party.

On September 24, 2008, Hot Hot Heat would make an appearance on second season of American-Canadian children's television series, Yo Gabba Gabba!, with the song, "Time to Go Outdoors", featured on season's third episode, "Talent". At some point during this period, founding bassist, Hawthorne quietly left the band. Parker Bossley from Canadian dance-punk band, Fake Shark - Real Zombie! would become the group's new bassist. Ironically, another member of Fake Shark - Real Zombie!, Canadian guitarist, Louis Hearn would later on become the group's next bassist following Bossley's departure from the group in 2010.

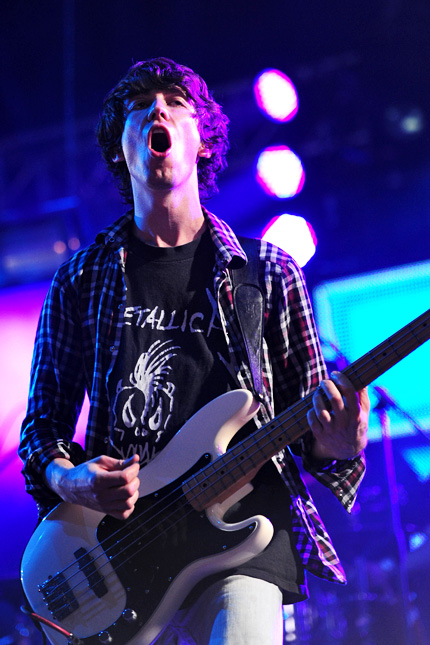
Bassist Louis Hearn performing in 2011

The band's fourth studio album, Future Breeds was released June 8, 2010, through Dine Alone Records. To build anticipation for the release the band performed residencies at two small clubs in the United States, Public Assembly in New York City, and Bootleg Theater in Los Angeles throughout May and June 2010 respectively.

Hot Hot Heat's public activity was scant in the 2010s; however, they debuted a new song, "Who You Calling Kid?", as the theme song for YTV’s Canadian teen-sitcom series, Mr. Young, as the show first premiered on March 1 2011, It was later officially released as a standalone digital single on January 24, 2012. A year later, they’ve debuted "Mayor of the City", in May 2013. In response to a fan's question on Twitter, Hot Hot Heat mentioned a release for an album in the fall of 2015. On September 10, 2015, Hot Hot Heat announced new material via their Instagram page for a spring 2016 release. On Friday June 24, 2016, Hot Hot Heat released a 10-track self-titled album and announced it would be their final album.

After the band split, Bays reunited with former bassist, Bossley to form, electro pop project, Fur Trade.

On November 18, 2023, the band announced they had reunited via social media, with Bays, Hawley, DeCaro and Bossley consisting as the line-up. Their return single, "Shock Me" was released Dec 1. 2023. On January 26, 2024, however, the band announced via social media that their reunion had come to an abrupt end just before the new year due to Bays feeling "he could not participate."

== Members ==
=== Former members ===
- Steve Bays – keyboards (1999–2016, 2023), lead vocals (2000–2016, 2023), backing vocals (1999–2000)
- Paul Hawley – drums, backing vocals (1999–2016, 2023)
- Dante DeCaro – guitar (2001–2005, 2023)
- Parker Bossley – bass, backing vocals (2008–2010, 2023)
- Dustin Hawthorne – bass (1999–2008)
- Matthew Marnik – lead vocals (1999–2000)
- Luke Paquin – guitar, backing vocals (2005–2016)
- Louis Hearn – bass, backing vocals (2010–2016)

==== Former touring musicians ====
- Jimmy Sweet – keyboards, guitar, percussion (2007–2010)

== Discography ==
=== Studio albums ===
Title	Album details	Peak chart positions					
Title	Album details	AUS Hit.	GER	SCO	UK	US	US Indie
Make Up the Breakdown	Released: October 8, 2002; Label: Sub Pop	19	—	38	35	146	5
Elevator	Released: April 5, 2005; Label: Sire	10	92	31	34	34	—
Happiness Ltd.	Released: September 11, 2007; Label: Sire/Warner Music	—	—	—	133	86	—
Future Breeds	Released: June 8, 2010; Label: Dangerbird/Dine Alone	—	—	—	—	—	—
Hot Hot Heat	Released: June 24, 2016; Label: Kaw-Liga/Culvert	—	—	—	—	—	—
"—" denotes album that did not chart or was not released

=== Compilations ===
- Scenes One Through Thirteen (2002)

=== EPs ===
- Hot Hot Heat four song 7" (1999)
- Hot Hot Heat Split the Red Light Sting (2000)
- Hot Hot Heat three song 7" (2001)
- Knock Knock Knock (2002)
- Happiness Ltd. EP (2007)

=== Singles ===
List of singles, with selected chart positions and certifications, showing year released and album name
Title	Year	Peak positions										Album
Title	Year	CAN Emg.	CAN Alt	CAN Rock	MEX Air.	SCO	UK	UK Rock	US Bub.	US DL	US Alt.	Album
"Bandages"	2003	—	×	×	×	27	25	—	—	—	19	Make Up the Breakdown
"No, Not Now"	2003	—	×	×	×	46	38	—	—	—	—	Make Up the Breakdown
"Talk to Me, Dance with Me"	2003	—	×	×	×	—	78	12	—	—	33	Make Up the Breakdown
"Island of the Honest Man"	2005	—	×	—	×	—	—	—	—	—	—	Elevator
"Goodnight Goodnight"	2005	—	×	20	×	33	36	—	2	59	27	Elevator
"Middle of Nowhere"	2005	—	×	23	×	50	47	—	—	—	23	Elevator
"Christmas Day in the Sun"	2005	—	×	—	×	—	—	—	—	—	—	Non-album single
"Give Up?"	2007	—	×	—	×	—	—	—	—	—	—	Happiness Ltd.
"Let Me In"	2007	24	×	19	×	54	138	—	—	—	—	Happiness Ltd.
"Harmonicas & Tambourines"	2007	—	×	44	×	—	—	—	—	—	—	Happiness Ltd.
"21@12"	2010	—	28	—	—	—	—	—	—	—	—	Future Breeds
"Goddess on the Prairie"	2010	—	13	38	—	—	—	—	—	—	—	Future Breeds
"Mayor of the City"	2013	—	—	—	—	—	—	—	—	—	—	Hot Hot Heat
"Kid Who Stays in the Picture"	2016	—	14	25	38	—	—	—	—	—	—	Hot Hot Heat
"Pulling Levers"	2016	—	43	—	—	—	—	—	—	—	—	Hot Hot Heat
"Shock Me"	2023	—	—	—	—	—	—	—	—	—	—	Non-album single
"—" denotes releases that did not chart. "×" denotes periods where charts did not exist or were not archived.

== See also ==
- Music of Vancouver
- Canadian rock
- List of Canadian musicians
- List of bands from Canada
- List of bands from British Columbia
- Category:Canadian musical groups
