= Talk to Me, Dance with Me =

Single by Hot Hot Heat

from the album Make Up the Breakdown
- B-side: "Oh, Goddammit"
- Released: November 3, 2003
- Genre: Indie rock
- Length: 2:47
- Label: Sub Pop
- Songwriters: Steve Bays, Dante DeCaro, Paul Hawley, Dustin Hawthorne

Hot Hot Heat singles chronology
"No, Not Now" (2003)	"Talk to Me, Dance with Me" (2003)	"Island of the Honest Man" (2005)

Music video
- "Talk to Me, Dance with Me" on YouTube

"Talk to Me, Dance with Me" is a song by Canadian indie rock band Hot Hot Heat from their first album, Make Up the Breakdown. The song was released in the U.S. as the third single from the album on November 3, 2003. It reached number 33 on the Modern Rock Tracks chart.

== Track listing ==
=== CD ===
1. Talk to Me, Dance with Me
2. Oh Goddamnit
3. Le Le Low (Live)
