= Make Up the Breakdown =

Studio album by Hot Hot Heat
- Released: October 8, 2002
- Recorded: 2002
- Genre: Dance-rock; dance-punk; post-punk
- Length: 32:00
- Label: Sub Pop
- Producer: Hot Hot Heat, Jack Endino

Hot Hot Heat chronology
| Knock Knock Knock (2002) | Make Up the Breakdown (2002) | Elevator (2005) |

Professional ratings
Aggregate scores
| Source | Rating |
|---|---|
| Metacritic | 74/100 |
Review scores
| Source | Rating |
| AllMusic | 4/5 stars |
| Entertainment Weekly | B+ |
| The Guardian | 4/5 stars |
| Los Angeles Times | 3.5/4 stars |
| Mojo | 3/5 stars |
| NME | 9/10 |
| Pitchfork | 8.7/10 |
| Q | 3/5 stars |
| Rolling Stone | 3/5 stars |
| Spin | 8/10 |

Make Up the Breakdown is the debut album by Hot Hot Heat, following the release of the Knock Knock Knock EP. It was released on October 8, 2002. It was ranked the 20th best album of the year on Pitchfork's Top 50 Albums of 2002.

== Track listing ==
| No. | Title | Length |
|---|---|---|
| 1. | "Naked in the City Again" | 3:13 |
| 2. | "No, Not Now" | 2:34 |
| 3. | "Get In or Get Out" | 2:52 |
| 4. | "Bandages" | 3:35 |
| 5. | "Oh, Goddamnit" | 2:31 |
| 6. | "Aveda" | 2:51 |
| 7. | "This Town" | 3:11 |
| 8. | "Talk to Me, Dance with Me" | 2:49 |
| 9. | "Save Us S.O.S." | 3:47 |
| 10. | "In Cairo" | 4:54 |

== Personnel ==
- Hot Hot Heat – producer
  - Dante DeCaro – guitar
  - Steve Bays – keyboards, vocals
  - Dustin Hawthorne – bass guitar
  - Paul Hawley – drums
- Craig Aaronson – A&R
- Ed Brooks – mastering
- Jack Endino – producer, engineer, mixing
- John Goodmanson – mixing
- Patrick Hawley
- Tony Kiewel – A&R
- Jesse LeDoux – design
- Brian Tamborello – photography
- Chris Walla – engineer, mixing

== Charts ==
=== Album ===
Billboard (United States)

| Year | Chart | Position |
|---|---|---|
| 2003 | Heatseekers | 8 |
| 2003 | The Billboard 200 | 146 |
| 2004 | Top Heatseekers | 3 |
| 2004 | Top Independent Albums | 5 |

=== Singles ===
Billboard (United States)

| Year | Single | Chart | Position |
|---|---|---|---|
| 2003 | "Bandages" | Modern Rock Tracks | 19 |
| 2003 | "Talk to Me, Dance with Me" | Modern Rock Tracks | 33 |
