= What Makes a Woman =

Promotional single by Katy Perry

from the album Smile
- Released: August 20, 2020
- Studio: House of Mouse Studios (Stockholm, Sweden); MXM Studios (Stockholm, Sweden)
- Length: 2:11
- Label: Capitol
- Songwriters: Katy Perry; Johan Carlsson; John Ryan; Jacob Kasher Hindlin; Sarah Hudson
- Producer: Johan Carlsson

Performance video
- "What Makes a Woman" (Acoustic) on YouTube

Animated video
- "What Makes A Woman" (The Smile Video Series) on YouTube

"What Makes a Woman" is a song by American singer Katy Perry from her sixth studio album Smile. It was written by Perry, John Ryan, Jacob Kasher Hindlin, Sarah Hudson, and the song's producer Johan Carlsson, with co-production by Elvira Anderfjärd. Perry acknowledged that the song was written to her daughter, Daisy Bloom. It was released as album's first promotional single on August 20, 2020, through Capitol Records.

Upon its release, the song received polarized reviews, with most of critics praising Perry's performance and song's production, with lyrics being mainly panned. "What Makes A Woman" peaked at number 40 on the New Zealand Hot Singles chart. The track was given with two visuals: acoustic performance published on the same day as the song, and animated video released as a part of The Smile Video Series on September 1, 2020.

== Background and composition ==
Perry first spoke about "What Makes a Woman" on interview with NRJ Lebanon in June 2020, where she explained the song meaning: "That is a hope I have for my future child, is that she doesn't have any limits on any of her dreams, or what she wants to be, or who she thinks she is. And, you know, she can change whenever she wants. She doesn't have to...she can try everything on if she wants; figure out what fits. And so I think that song is important to me and important for her." She further elaborated on the song in Billboard interview in following month:

"It's a song about how you are gonna to have a tough time measuring what truly makes a woman because women are so many things. And I like to say not one thing, not just one thing. And such chameleons, and so adaptable, and so malleable and transformative. And can handle the weight of the world on their backs and do it all in heels. And make it look pretty effortless sometimes. I've just experienced the feeling, just, I feel very empowered creating a life and being a working woman whilst doing that," she continued. "It's like, can you create limbs while promoting a record? Hello!...So 'What Makes a Woman' will be a song that will kind of secretly be dedicated to her."

"What Makes a Woman" was written by Perry, Sarah Hudson, Jacob Kasher Hindlin, John Ryan and Johan Carlsson. Carlsson handled the song's main and vocal production, while Peter Karlsson helped producing vocals, and Elvira Anderfjärd provided backing vocals for the track and serves as its co-producer. This is a ballad which talks about celebrating womanhood and was written specifically to Perry's daughter, Daisy Dove Bloom, and it's one of only two songs with vulgar slurs on the album. The song's production was called "countryish" by some publications. "What Makes a Woman" was written in D minor key and it's backed-up by electric guitars, while Perry's vocals spans from E3 to B4.

== Release and promotion ==
"What Makes a Woman" was released on August 20, 2020 as the first promotional single of Perry's sixth studio album Smile. It was supported by the release of acoustic video on singer's YouTube channel. It was directed by Tim Sekiguchi and it features pregnant singer in flowy, purple dotted dress performing the song live. On September 1 animated video for the track was also released as a part of The Smile Video Series, and it highlights "all kinds of strong, beautiful women" according to Billboard's Rania Aniftos. It was serviced to Australian radio on August 21.

Perry performed the song with Jack Blocker on the season finale of American Idol season 22.

== Critical reception ==
Entertainment Weekly's Leah Greenblatt described "What Makes a Woman" as "strummy" and "winsome", adding that it "could be a B side from peak-era Shania Twain." Alexa Camp of Slant Magazine was positive about the track, however according to her "it comes too late [in the album] and ends too soon." Mike Wass from Idolator called the song a "gem", while Jason Brow of Hollywood Life called it "heartfelt ode". Writing for Insider Courtney Larocca praised Perry's vocals, saying that they have "warmth" and "deapth, which are perfectly paired with an absolutely gorgeous guitar riff."

Emily Mackay of The Guardian called the song "the weakest" on the album, describing it as a "cliched, countryish musing on the supposed mystery of femininity." Lindsay Zoladz from The New York Times described the song as "sweet" and "twangy". Pitchfork's Dani Blum found the track's songwriting to be similar to Perry's previous album, Witness (2017), and One Direction's "What Makes You Beautiful" (2011), without improving on them. Writing for Stereogum, Chris Deville said that the track "brings nothing new or interesting to its subset of inspirational ballads." Helen Brown of The Independent called the song one of the "low points" of the album, because of the "uncertain way" Perry "toys with gender cliches." Callie Ahlgrim and Courtney Larocca from Insider questioned song's lyrics, with Ahlgrim's conclusion being "I understand that Perry's goal is to capture the contradiction and duality of womanhood, but that gets muddied by her spaghetti-against-the-wall execution," while Larocca calles them "vomit-inducing".

== Credits and personnel ==
Credits adapted from Tidal.

- Katy Perry – vocals, songwriting
- Johan Carlsson – songwriting, production, vocal production, acoustic guitar, programming, shaker, synthetizer
- Elvira Anderfjärd – backing vocals, production, co-production, bass, drums, electric guitar, organ, programming
- Jacob Kasher Hidlin – songwriting
- John Ryan – songwriting, electric guitar
- Sarah Hudson – songwriting
- Peter Karlsson – vocal production
- Cory Bice – engineering, studio personnel
- Jeremy Lertola – engineering, studio personnel
- Sam Holland – engineering, studio personnel
- John Hanes – mixing engineering, studio personnel
- Serban Ghenea – mixing, studio personnel
- Dave Kutch – mastering, studio personnel
- Chris Anokute – A&R
- Lauren Glucksman – A&R

== Charts ==
Chart performance for "What Makes a Woman"
Chart (2020)	Peak position
New Zealand Hot Singles (RMNZ)	40
