= Super 8 (soundtrack) =

Film score by Michael Giacchino
- Released: June 13, 2011
- Recorded: 2011
- Studios: Newman Scoring Stage, Twentieth Century Fox Studios
- Genre: Film score
- Length: 77:19
- Label: Varèse Sarabande

Michael Giacchino chronology
Cars 2 (2011)	Super 8 (2011)	Monte Carlo (2011)

Super 8 (Music from the Motion Picture) is the score album composed and arranged by Michael Giacchino, conducted by Tim Simonec and performed by the Hollywood Studio Symphony for the 2011 film of the same name directed by J. J. Abrams. The album was released on June 13, 2011 by Varèse Sarabande featuring 33 tracks from Giacchino's orchestral score. The music featured influences of John Williams' score for earlier-Steven Spielberg directorials (Spielberg also served as the film's producer, through Amblin Entertainment) and was recorded in a short span of time.

It received critical acclaim for the subtlety, minimalism, nostalgia factor and paying homage to Williams' with being considered as one of the film's best aspects. Giacchino won the Saturn Award for Best Music for his work in the film.

== Background ==
J. J. Abrams enlisted Mission: Impossible III (2006) and Star Trek (2009) composer Michael Giacchino to score music for Super 8. Giacchino was simultaneously working on Cars 2 (2011) and with the completion of the film's scoring in May 2011, he began working on the film thereafter, although he written 90% of the themes prepared for recording. In an interview with Collider, Giacchino said that the score will have shades of early-Steven Spielberg directorials from the late-1970s and 1980s. The score was recorded at the Newman Scoring Stage at 20th Century Fox Studios, with Tim Simonec conducting the Hollywood Studio Symphony. The album featured 33 tracks from Giacchino's score, and was released on June 13, 2011 by Varèse Sarabande record label.

== Reception ==
Jonathan Broxton of Movie Music UK wrote: "this score is one of the most impressive cinematic works of Michael Giacchino's career. While his TV score for Lost had the leitmotivic complexity to end all, and while his Academy Award-winning score for Up had buckets of emotional pathos, and while scores like Star Trek had a great deal of action music power and resonance, Super 8 is the first of his scores to combine all three elements together into a satisfying whole that has worked personally for me as a standalone listening experience. This, combined with the obvious inspiration he took from the story and its deeper meanings, as well as the clear and intentional illusions to the classic work of John Williams, makes Super 8 a winner." James Christopher Monger of AllMusic wrote: "Spielberg and Williams' iconic themes may never find their match, but Abrams is wise to keep Giacchino as his right-hand man, as with each new collaboration, the pair inches closer and closer to greatness." The Joy of Movies wrote: "Super 8 as a film had something special. It felt genuine. Capturing the feeling of that point between childhood and adolescence and the feelings that come with it. This was a true adventure movie that wasn't afraid to slow down and get to know its characters first and foremost like the classic films of the '80's, and the music here is not afraid to do the exact same thing. It is mysterious, it is reflective, and it manages what only the best scores do. It provides the perfect emotional connection between us and the experiences of the characters. This is one of the best scores of the year."

Filmtracks.com wrote: "A significant number of the cues from Giacchino's score could have been combined and shaved down to their highlights to create an outstanding 45 minute presentation. As it stands, none of the songs heard in the film is included and the score drags badly at several points. The product was delayed on CD until after audiences lost interest in the film at the theatres as well, leaving something of a sour note over the entire affair. Sound quality remains an issue with Giacchino's feature film scores, an incredibly flat and dull ambience making the music sound two rooms away and restraining the moments that should soar with vibrant energy. This issue is particularly pronounced in Super 8, with some of the fullest sequences perhaps unintentionally matching the archival sound of early 1980's scores. If Giacchino ever wants to actually match the engrossing tone of Williams' classics, perhaps he and his crew should shift the time they spend on conjuring cute, ridiculous cue titles to instead reworking the recording and mixing of these muted and very dry scores. Still, there are great moments on this album and it will make for a thorough souvenir for fans of the film, but like any score that features a secondary theme far more impressive than its primary one, you can't help but walk away from Super 8 strangely disappointed."

James Southall of MovieWave wrote: "Super 8 is this composer's finest work to date. The 78-minute album (which includes as a bonus the wonderful music Giacchino wrote for “The Case”, the film-within-a-film) doesn't drag, is full of magical moments, has a handful of individual pieces of music of the highest order (not just the aforementioned “Letting Go” – which is worth mentioning again and again, to be honest, and worth listening to again and again – but several others – check out the fantastic, dynamic “The Evacuation of Lillian”) and while there are hints of Williams (most obviously the brilliant Close Encounters of the Third Kind), this is essentially pure Giacchino, and all the better for that. My only nit-pick is with the overly dry recording – otherwise this is an album to savour."

== Analysis ==
Writer Daniel Walber of IndieWire, analysed the subtlety of the film's music and the minimalistic nature it attributed to. He said the Giacchino had created the sweeping canvas on the lines of John Williams' music for E.T. the Extra-Terrestrial (1982) "filling the soundtrack with aching violins and sad piano that makes sure there's absolutely no way you can miss out on the intended emotion of a scene" which was both "grating and obnoxious". He cited several examples, including Giacchino's own score for the film's opening sequence in Up (2009), and said "With no dialogue, the music almost replaces verbal expression as we watch the early life and romance of our aging hero. The animation combines perfectly with the florid piano score, which is not only the sort of bravura composition that will stay with you long after the film has ended, but an extremely dynamic accomplishment as well. Giacchino uses melody to create a sort of musical story, which becomes an equal part of the visual narrative instead of simply supporting it." Walber however felt that the film's score "has the kind of generic instrumentation and uninteresting structure that just seems uninspired in comparison".

== Track listing ==
All music is composed by Michael Giacchino.

Track listing
No.	Title	Length
1.	"Super 8"	1:44
2.	"Family Matters"	0:29
3.	"Model Painting"	0:41
4.	"Acting Chops"	0:40
5.	"Aftermath Class"	5:54
6.	"Thoughts of Cubism"	0:48
7.	"We'll Fix It in Post-Haste"	0:44
8.	"Production Woes"	0:34
9.	"Train of Thought"	0:35
10.	"Circle Gets the Cube"	1:06
11.	"Breen There, Ate That"	1:12
12.	"Dead Over Heels"	0:48
13.	"Gas and Go"	1:34
14.	"Looking for Lucy"	0:49
15.	"Radio Haze"	1:08
16.	"Mom's Necklace"	1:33
17.	"Shootus Interuptus"	2:35
18.	"Thoughts of Mom"	1:41
19.	"Woodward Bites It"	1:54
20.	"Alice Projects on Joe"	2:29
21.	"Neighborhood Watch — Fail"	4:45
22.	"The Evacuation of Lillian"	3:40
23.	"A Truckload of Trouble"	0:57
24.	"Lambs on the Lam"	2:40
25.	"Woodward's Home Movies"	2:40
26.	"Spotted Lambs"	1:37
27.	"Air Force HQ or Bust"	1:04
28.	"World's Worst Field Trip"	3:36
29.	"The Siege of Lillian"	2:57
30.	"Creature Comforts"	10:10
31.	"Letting Go"	5:18
32.	"Super 8 Suite"	5:54
33.	"The Case (Note: Although Giacchino had composed the track, it is credited on the liner notes to the character, Charles Kaznyk, played by Riley Griffiths)"	3:28
Total length:		77:19

== Accolades ==
In addition to the following awards, Paramount Pictures submitted the film for several considerations for the 65th British Academy Film Awards including Best Original Music category, but failed to enter the longlist. Giacchino's score was even shortlisted for Best Original Score at the 84th Academy Awards.

Award	Category	Recipient(s)	Result
4th Annual Coming of Age Awards	Special Soundtrack		Won
38th Saturn Awards	Best Music	Michael Giacchino	Won
2011 BAM Awards	Best Score	Michael Giacchino	Won
2011 Phoenix Film Critics Society Awards	Best Original Score	Michael Giacchino	Nominated
2011 Satellite Awards	Best Original Score	Michael Giacchino	Nominated
Golden Reel Awards	Music in a Feature Film		Nominated

== Personnel ==
Credits adapted from CD liner notes.

- Music composer, producer, arranger – Michael Giacchino
- Musical assistance – Dave Martina
- Recording – Tim Lauber, Tom Hardisty, Dan Wallin
- Mixing – Dan Wallin
- Mixing assistance – Michael Aarvold
- Mastering – Erick Labson
- Music editor – Paul Apelgren
- Supervising music editor – Alex Levy
- Music supervisor – George Drakoulias
- Pro-tools operator – Vincent Cirelli
- Engineer – Denis St. Amand, Ryan Robinson
- Stage manager – Greg Dennen, Jamie Olvera, Richard Wheeler, Tom Steel
- Stage assistance – Mick Giacchino
- Score co-ordinator – Andrea Datzman
- Soundtrack co-ordinator– Jason Richmond
- Music preparation – Booker White
- Executive producer – Bryan Burk, J.J. Abrams, Steven Spielberg
- Soundtrack executive producer (Varèse Sarabande) – Robert Townson
- Executive in charge of music (Paramount Pictures) – Randy Spendlove
- Liner notes – J.J. Abrams

Orchestra

- Performer – Hollywood Studio Symphony
- Orchestrator, conductor – Tim Simonec
- Additional orchestration – Andrea Datzman, Brad Dechter, Cameron Patrick, Chris Tilton, Ira Hearshen, Larry Kenton, Mark Gasbarro, Marshall Bowen, Norman Ludwin, Peter Boyer
- Contractor – Reggie Wilson
- Concertmaster – Clayton Haslop

Instruments

- Bass – Charles Nenneker, Karl Vincent, Nick Rosen, Norman Ludwin, Peter Doubrovsky, Richard Feves, Tim Emmons, Dave Stone
- Bassoon – Allen Savedoff, Andrew Radford, Rose Corrigan
- Cello – Alexander Zhiroff, Dane Little, John Acosta, Kevan Torfeh, Richard Naill, Stefanie Fife, Suzie Katayama, Timothy Landauer, Vahe Hayrikyan, Victor Lawrence, Steve Richards
- Clarinet – Don Markese, John Mitchell, Michael Vaccaro
- Flute – Dick Mitchell, Steve Kujala, Bobby Shulgold
- French Horn – Brad Warnaar, Brian O'Connor, Joe Meyer, John Reynolds, Mark Adams (10), Steven Becknell, Steven Durnin, Rick Todd
- Guitar – George Doering
- Harp – Eleanor Choate, Gayle Levant
- Oboe – Joseph Stone, John Yoakum
- Percussion – Alex Neciosup-Acuna, Bernie Dresel, Emil Radocchia, Walter Rodriguez, Dan Greco
- Piano, celesta – Mark Gasbarro
- Synthesizers, organ – Mark Le Vang
- Timpani – Don Williams
- Trombone – Alan Kaplan, Bill Reichenbach, Steven Holtman, Alex Iles
- Trumpet – Jeff Bunnell, Jon Lewis, Larry Hall, Paul Salvo, Rick Baptist
- Tuba – Douglas Tornquist, John Van Houten
- Viola – Alan Busteed, Caroline Buckman, Denyse Buffum, Evan Wilson, Harry Shirinian, Jennie Hansen, Jorge Moraga, Karen Elaine, Karie Prescott, Marda Todd, Maria Newman, Pam Goldsmith, Richard Rintoul, Darrin McCann
- Violin – Alan Grunfeld, Alexandr Shlifer, Alyssa Park, Anatoly Rosinsky, Armen Anassian, Barbra Porter, Belinda Broughton, Cameron Patrick, Carolyn Osborn, Charles Bisharat, Darius Campo, Galina Golovin, Haim Shtrum, Jim Sitterly, Joel Derouin, John Wittenberg, Josefina Vergara, Larry Greenfield, Marina Manukian, Mark Robertson, Miran Kojian, Norman Hughes, Peter Kent, Rafael Rishik, Razdan Kuyumjian, Rebecca Bunnell, Ron Clark, Shalini Vijayan, Shari Zippert, Sid Page, Sungil Lee, Tereza Stanislav, Terry Glenny, Tiffany Hu, Vladimir Polimatidi, Ken Yerke
