= Future Breeds =

Studio album by Hot Hot Heat
- Released: June 8, 2010
- Recorded: 2008–2009
- Genre: Indie rock, alternative rock, new wave
- Length: 40:31
- Label: Dangerbird, Dine Alone
- Producer: Ryan Dahle

Hot Hot Heat chronology
Happiness Ltd. (2007)	Future Breeds (2010)	Hot Hot Heat (2016)

Professional ratings
Aggregate scores
Source	Rating
Metacritic	(70/100)
Review scores
Source	Rating
Allmusic	3.5/5 stars
Alternative Press	4.5/5.0 stars
Pitchfork Media	(6.8/10)
Rock Sound	(7/10)
Slant Magazine	3/5 stars
Spin Magazine	3/5 stars

Future Breeds is Hot Hot Heat's fourth studio album, released on June 8, 2010, under Dine Alone Records. It is the first album with new bassist Parker Bossley, from Fake Shark – Real Zombie!

== Background ==
On November 11, 2009, Vancouver photoblog, theFuturists released two music videos from the new album compiled of live and candid footage of the band from seven months of 2009.

The album was leaked to the internet on May 29.

Three tracks from the album, "JFK's LSD", "Future Breeds", and "Goddess on the Prairie" were posted on Spin Magazine's website. In addition, "Goddess on the Prairie" was one of the songs available in a music pack optionally bundled with Winamp 5.58.

The album was illustrated by Canadian artist Keith Jones.

== Track listing ==
No.	Title	Length
1.	"YVR"	2:11
2.	"21@12"	3:40
3.	"Times a Thousand"	3:16
4.	"Implosionatic"	2:31
5.	"Goddess on the Prairie"	3:17
6.	"Zero Results"	3:33
7.	"Future Breeds"	4:21
8.	"JFK's LSD"	3:37
9.	"Jedidiah"	2:42
10.	"Buzinezz az Uzual"	4:14
11.	"What Is Rational?"	3:08
12.	"Nobody's Accusing You (Of Having a Good Time)"	4:01

Bonus track
No.	Title	Length
13.	"No Applause Allowed"	3:06
