= American Idol season 22 =

American Idol
- Season 22
- Promotional poster, which pays tribute to the film The Wizard of Oz (1939)
- Hosted by: Ryan Seacrest
- Judges: Luke Bryan; Katy Perry; Lionel Richie
- Winner: Abi Carter
- Runner-up: Will Moseley
- No. of episodes: 18

Release
- Original network: ABC
- Original release: February 18 – May 19, 2024

Season chronology
- ← Previous; Season 21 Next → Season 23

The twenty-second season of American Idol premiered on February 18, 2024, on the ABC television network. Ryan Seacrest returned as host; Luke Bryan, Katy Perry, and Lionel Richie returned as judges. This season was Perry's final one on the show; she announced her departure on February 13, 2024, five days before the premiere.

Abi Carter won the season on May 19, 2024, while Will Moseley was the runner-up, and Jack Blocker finished in third place.

== Auditions ==
The Idol Across America virtual auditions program returned. Remote auditions took place from August 2 to September 8, 2023, as well as a number of open-call auditions, and from these, the producers selected the contestants who were then invited to audition in front of the judges. There were three new locations, the hometowns of the judges: Leesburg (Bryan), Tuskegee (Richie), and Santa Barbara (Perry).

The "platinum ticket" also returned from the previous two seasons. During the audition round, a total of three platinum tickets were awarded. The platinum ticket recipients were Odell Bunton Jr., Abi Carter, and Julia Gagnon. Carter was the first "platinum ticket" recipient to win the series.

American Idol (season 22) – auditions
City	Filming date(s)	Filming venue
Leesburg, Georgia	September 19–20, 2023	Lee County High School
Tuskegee, Alabama	October 2–3, 2023	Tuskegee University
Santa Barbara, California	October 17–18, 2023	Music Academy of the West
Los Angeles	October 24–25, 2023	Calamigos Ranch
Nashville	November 11–12, 2023	Graduate Nashville

== Hollywood week ==
Hollywood week was filmed on December 10, 2023, at the Barker Hangar in Santa Monica. Dubbed the "Idol Arena", each contestant was chosen at random to perform a solo, and fifty-six of them advanced to the next round. The platinum ticket recipients (Abi Carter, Julia Gagnon, and Odell Bunton Jr.) sang "California Dreamin'" by The Mamas & the Papas as a trio. The advantage they received was the ability to skip this round, they were asked to do a bonus performance. The season did not feature a duet round. The "Showstoppers" round determined the Top 24 semifinalists.

== Showstopper round ==
The Showstopper round featured the top 56 contestants performing for the judges and a live audience at the Barker Hangar. The round was filmed on December 11, 2023, and aired on April 1, 2024. The judges narrowed the number of contestants to 24. Here is a list of the contestants who reached the top 24 and the song they performed. Contestants are listed in the order they performed.

Showstopper round (April 1)
Contestant	Song
Jordan Anthony	"Love in the Dark"
Odell Bunton Jr.	"Don't Let Me Be Misunderstood"
Nya	"Get Ready"
Blake Proehl	"In My Blood"
Triston Harper	"By Your Grace"
Roman Collins	"Come Together"
Kaibrienne	"Simple Man"
Jack Blocker	"You Should've Seen the Other Guy"
McKenna Faith Breinholt	"Anyone"
Mia Matthews	"You Ain't Woman Enough (To Take My Man)"
Emmy Russell	"More Hearts Than Mine"
Will Moseley	"Ain't No Sunshine"
Ajii	"Too Close"
KAYKO	"Gives You Hell"
Elleigh Marie	"Golden Slumbers"
Kennedy Reid	"Total Eclipse of the Heart"
KBlocks	"River"
Abi Carter	"If I Could Turn Back Time"
Jayna Elise	"It's All Coming Back to Me Now"
Quintavious	"You Say"
Hailey Mia	"Alive"
Jennifer Jeffries	"Northern Attitude"
Julia Gagnon	"And I Am Telling You I'm Not Going"
Mackenzie Sol	"With a Little Help from My Friends"

== Top 24 (April 7 & 8) ==
The top 24 contestants were split into two groups of twelve and performed one solo each at the Aulani resort in Kapolei, Hawaii. The first group taped on February 7 and aired on April 7, while the second group taped on February 8 and aired on April 8. Tori Kelly served as a guest mentor and judge for the first group, and Jelly Roll for the second group. Two contestants from each group will be eliminated based on the public vote, and the rest will advance to the top 20. Contestants are listed in the order they performed.

Color key:

This contestant was saved by America's vote.
This contestant was eliminated.

Group 1 (April 7)
Contestant	Song	Result
Hailey Mia	"she's all i wanna be"	Eliminated
Jordan Anthony	"Titanium"	Safe
Jayna Elise	"Confident"	Safe
Julia Gagnon	"Rumour Has It"	Safe
KAYKO	"How to Live Without You"	Safe
Nya	"The Best"	Safe
Blake Proehl	"Anyone"	Eliminated
Abi Carter	"Oceans (Where Feet May Fail)"	Safe
Quintavious	"Something in the Water"	Safe
Kaibrienne	"Heaven"	Safe
Will Moseley	"(Sittin' On) The Dock of the Bay"	Safe
McKenna Faith Breinholt	"The Story"	Safe

Group 2 (April 8)
Contestant	Song	Result
Odell Bunton Jr.	"Uptown Funk"	Safe
Elleigh Marie	"Forget You"	Eliminated
Mackenzie Sol	"Jealous"	Safe
Jennifer Jeffries	"Bruises"	Safe
Emmy Russell	"Beautiful Things"	Safe
Ajii	"Higher"	Safe
Kennedy Reid	"Fancy"	Safe
Jack Blocker	"Rainbow"	Safe
Roman Collins	"How Sweet It Is (To Be Loved by You)"	Safe
KBlocks	"Harleys in Hawaii"	Eliminated
Mia Matthews	"Daddy's Hands"	Safe
Triston Harper	"God's Country"	Safe

Non-competition performances (April 7)
Performer	Song
Tori Kelly	"High Water"
Iam Tongi	"Why Kiki?"

Non-competition performance (April 8)
Performer	Song
Jelly Roll	"Halfway to Hell"

== Top 20 (April 14 & 15) ==
The top 20 performances were taped on Wednesday, April 10 and aired on Sunday, April 14, followed by the live results show on Monday, April 15.

Color key:

This contestant was chosen by the public to advance.
This contestant was not chosen by the public, and had to perform again for the judges.
This contestant was not chosen by the public, but was chosen by the judges as a Wild Card pick.
This contestant was eliminated.

Contestants are listed in the order they performed.

Top 20 (April 14)
Contestant	Song	Result
Jack Blocker	"You Don't Mess Around with Jim"	Safe
Mia Matthews	"Wildflowers and Wild Horses"	Safe
Mackenzie Sol	"I'll Never Love Again"	Wild Card
Roman Collins	"Never Would Have Made It"	Wild Card
Kennedy Reid	"Love Can Build a Bridge"	Wild Card
Ajii	"Like a Stone"	Wild Card
Jennifer Jeffries	"Grave Digger"	Wild Card
Emmy Russell	"Want You"	Safe
Triston Harper	"H-O-P-E"	Safe
Odell Bunton Jr.	"The Door"	Wild Card
KAYKO	"Over You"	Safe
Jordan Anthony	"When the Party's Over"	Wild Card
Quintavious	"Hollow"	Wild Card
Kaibrienne	"Girl I Am Now"	Safe
Nya	"Georgia on My Mind"	Wild Card
Jayna Elise	"My All"	Wild Card
Abi Carter	"Welcome to the Black Parade"	Safe
Will Moseley	"Makin' Me Look Good Again"	Safe
McKenna Faith Breinholt	"Both Sides, Now"	Safe
Julia Gagnon	"I Believe"	Safe

Top 20 (April 15)
Contestant	Song	Result
Quintavious	"Make It Happen"	Eliminated
McKenna Faith Breinholt	"Tumbleweed"	Safe
Jordan Anthony	"Attention"	Saved by the judges
Jack Blocker	"Feeling Whitney"	Safe
Kennedy Reid	"Somethin' Bad"	Eliminated
Jennifer Jeffries	"All I Want"	Eliminated
Ajii	"Call Out My Name"	Eliminated
Mia Matthews	"Burning House"	Safe
KAYKO	"What If?"	Safe
Nya	"Water"	Saved by the judges
Will Moseley	"Gone For Good"	Safe
Abi Carter	"My Mind"	Safe
Odell Bunton Jr.	"Wait on You"	Eliminated
Kaibrienne	"Zombie"	Safe
Mackenzie Sol	"False Alarms"	Eliminated
Emmy Russell	"Skinny"	Safe
Julia Gagnon	"Need a Favor"	Safe
Jayna Elise	"All I Wanted"	Saved by the judges
Triston Harper	"'Til You Can't"	Safe
Roman Collins	"It's a Man's Man's Man's World"	Saved by the judges

Non-competition performances (April 14)
Performer	Song
Teddy Swims	"Lose Control"
Paul Russell	"Lil Boo Thang"
Lauren Spencer-Smith	"Fingers Crossed"

== Finals ==
Color key:

This contestant was saved by America's vote.
This contestant was saved by the judges.
This contestant was eliminated.
This contestant won American Idol.
This contestant was the runner-up.
This contestant finished in third place.

=== Top 14 – Rock and Roll Hall of Fame (April 21) ===
Gene Simmons served as a guest mentor for the week. Each contestant performed one song from inductees of the Rock and Roll Hall of Fame. Contestants are listed in the order they performed.

Top 14 (April 21)
Contestant	Song	Result
Triston Harper	"Heartbreak Hotel"	Safe
Julia Gagnon	"Run to You"	Safe
Roman Collins	"You're All I Need to Get By"	Safe
Kaibrienne	"I Hate Myself for Loving You"	Safe
Jayna Elise	"I Have Nothing"	Safe
Mia Matthews	"Those Memories of You"	Safe
KAYKO	"High and Dry"	Safe
Emmy Russell	"I Can't Make You Love Me"	Safe
Jordan Anthony	"I Wanna Dance with Somebody (Who Loves Me)"	Eliminated
McKenna Faith Breinholt	"Hard to Say I'm Sorry"	Safe
Jack Blocker	"Don't Think Twice, It's All Right"	Safe
Nya	"I Say a Little Prayer"	Eliminated
Will Moseley	"Night Moves"	Safe
Abi Carter	"Goodbye Yellow Brick Road"	Safe

Non-competition performance
Performer	Song
Luke Bryan	"Small Town"

=== Top 12 – Billboard #1 Hits (April 22) ===
Meghan Trainor served as a guest mentor this week. Each contestant performed a Billboard #1 song. Contestants are listed in the order they performed.

Top 12 (April 22)
Contestant	Song	Result
Abi Carter	"All Too Well"	Safe
Will Moseley	"Starting Over"	Safe
Jayna Elise	"Diamonds"	Eliminated
Mia Matthews	"Over You"	Safe
Roman Collins	"Roar"	Eliminated
Jack Blocker	"Blinding Lights"	Safe
Emmy Russell	"Lose You to Love Me"	Safe
Triston Harper	"Beautiful Crazy"	Safe
Julia Gagnon	"Something in the Orange"	Safe
Kaibrienne	"Wrecking Ball"	Safe
McKenna Faith Breinholt	"Cardigan"	Safe
KAYKO	"Somebody That I Used to Know"	Safe

Non-competition performance
Performer	Song
David Archuleta	"Hell Together"

=== Top 10 – Contestants' birth year (April 28) ===
Shania Twain served as a guest mentor this week. Each contestant performed a song from the year of their birth. Contestants are listed in the order they performed.

Top 10 (April 28)
Contestant	Song	Result
Mia Matthews	"No One Needs to Know"	Eliminated
Jack Blocker	"Believe"	Safe
McKenna Faith Breinholt	"Iris"	Safe
KAYKO	"Teenage Dirtbag"	Eliminated
Emmy Russell	"All the Small Things"	Safe
Triston Harper	"She's Country"	Safe
Abi Carter	"Clocks"	Safe
Julia Gagnon	"Here I Am"	Safe
Will Moseley	"Modern Day Bonnie and Clyde"	Safe
Kaibrienne	"Here Without You"	Safe

Non-competition performances
Performer	Song
Just Sam	"One Moment in Time"
Scotty McCreery	"Cab in a Solo"

=== Top 8 – Judges' Song Contest (April 29) ===
The judges chose songs for each of the contestants to perform. Katy Perry had the most song choices selected by the contestants, and was able to save one contestant from elimination. Contestants are listed in the order they performed.

Top 8 (April 29)
Contestant	Song	Selected by	Result
Will Moseley	"Folsom Prison Blues"	Lionel Richie	Safe
Kaibrienne	"Traitor"	Katy Perry	Eliminated
McKenna Faith Breinholt	"Everywhere I Go"	Katy Perry	Saved by Katy Perry
Jack Blocker	"Always on My Mind"	Katy Perry	Safe
Abi Carter	"Bring Me to Life"	Luke Bryan	Safe
Julia Gagnon	"Over the Rainbow"	Luke Bryan	Safe
Triston Harper	"Sand in My Boots"	Lionel Richie	Safe
Emmy Russell	"Coal Miner's Daughter"	Katy Perry	Safe

Non-competition performances
Performers	Song
Jack Blocker & Emmy Russell	"Hello"
Triston Harper & Will Moseley	"What Makes You Country"
Melinda Doolittle, Colton Dixon and Danny Gokey	"Shackles (Praise You)" (Tribute to Mandisa)
Abi Carter, McKenna Faith Breinholt, Julia Gagnon, and Kaibrienne	"Wide Awake"

=== Top 7 – Dance songs & Adele (May 5) ===
Ciara served as a guest mentor for this week. Each contestant performed two songs: one dance song and one song from Adele's discography. Contestants are listed in the order they performed.

Top 7 (May 5)
Contestant	Order	Song	Result
Jack Blocker	1	"Long Tall Sally"	Safe
Jack Blocker	9	"One and Only"	Safe
Julia Gagnon	2	"Roam"	Eliminated
Julia Gagnon	11	"Set Fire to the Rain"	Eliminated
Abi Carter	3	"My Songs Know What You Did in the Dark (Light Em Up)"	Safe
Abi Carter	14	"Hello"	Safe
McKenna Faith Breinholt	4	"E.T."	Eliminated
McKenna Faith Breinholt	8	"Make You Feel My Love"	Eliminated
Will Moseley	5	"Gimme Three Steps"	Safe
Will Moseley	10	"Rolling in the Deep"	Safe
Emmy Russell	6	"Shut Up and Dance"	Safe
Emmy Russell	12	"Water Under the Bridge"	Safe
Triston Harper	7	"T-R-O-U-B-L-E"	Safe
Triston Harper	13	"Easy on Me"	Safe

Non-competition performance
Performer	Song
Meghan Trainor	"To the Moon" "Been Like This"

=== Top 5 – Disney (May 12) ===
Kane Brown served as a guest mentor this week. Each contestant performed two songs from Disney films. Contestants are listed in the order they performed.

Top 5 (May 12)
Contestant	Order	Song	Disney film	Result
Abi Carter	1	"Part of Your World"	The Little Mermaid	Safe
Abi Carter	8	"The Chain"	Guardians of the Galaxy Vol. 2	Safe
Triston Harper	2	"Almost There"	The Princess and the Frog	Eliminated
Triston Harper	7	"Life Is a Highway"	Cars	Eliminated
Emmy Russell	3	"The Climb"	Hannah Montana: The Movie	Eliminated
Emmy Russell	6	"Carried Me with You"	Onward	Eliminated
Jack Blocker	4	"Nobody's Fool"	Cars 2	Safe
Jack Blocker	9	"Space Oddity"	Indiana Jones and the Dial of Destiny	Safe
Will Moseley	5	"The Ballad of the Lonesome Cowboy"	Toy Story 4	Safe
Will Moseley	10	"Born to Be Wild"	D3: The Mighty Ducks	Safe

Non-competition performances
Performers	Song
Lionel Richie, Luke Bryan, Katy Perry, and Ryan Seacrest	"You've Got a Friend in Me"
Jenifer Lewis and Terence Blanchard	"Dig a Little Deeper"

=== Top 3 and Top 2 – Finale (May 19) ===
Jon Bon Jovi served as a guest mentor this week. Each contestant performed two songs – one from the Jon Bon Jovi discography and one dedicated to their hometowns – before the contestant who had the fewest votes up to that point was eliminated, thereby finishing in third place.

After Jack Blocker was eliminated, the Top 2 were Abi Carter and Will Moseley. Near the end of the show after the guest performances, Moseley and Carter sang their potential coronation singles. After the voting lines were closed, Carter was declared the winner while Moseley was runner-up.

Finale (May 19)
Contestant	Order	Song	Result
Will Moseley	1	"It's My Life"	Runner-up
Will Moseley	4	"My Town"	Runner-up
Will Moseley	7	"Good Book Bad"	Runner-up
Jack Blocker	2	"I'll Be There for You"	Third place
Jack Blocker	5	"All My Ex's Live in Texas"	Third place
Abi Carter	3	"Bed of Roses"	Winner
Abi Carter	6	"Somewhere"	Winner
Abi Carter	8	"This Isn't Over"	Winner

Non-competition performances
Performers	Song
Top 3	"Livin' on a Prayer"
Top 3 with Jon Bon Jovi	"Legendary"
Julia Gagnon with Jason Mraz	"I Feel Like Dancing"
Jayna Elise with Seal	"Crazy"
McKenna Faith Breinholt and Kaibrienne with James Bay	"Let It Go"
Luke Bryan	"Love You, Miss You, Mean It"
Mia Matthews with Luke Bryan	"Run"
Top 12 with Lionel Richie	"Running with the Night"
Triston Harper with Cody Johnson	"'Til You Can't"
Bishop Briggs	"Triumph"
Abi Carter with Bishop Briggs	"River"
Will Moseley, Jack Blocker, Triston Harper, Kayko, and Roman Collins with Nick Fradiani	"America" "Sweet Caroline"
Will Moseley with Hootie & the Blowfish	"Hold My Hand" "Let Her Cry" "Only Wanna Be with You"
Jack Blocker with Katy Perry	"What Makes a Woman"
New Kids on the Block	"Kids"
Kayko with New Kids on the Block	"You Got It (The Right Stuff)"
Emmy Russell with Wynonna	"Coal Miner's Daughter" "No One Else on Earth"
Roman Collins with CeCe Winans	"Goodness of God"
Abi Carter, Emmy Russell, Julia Gagnon, McKenna Faith Breinholt, Kaibrienne, Mia Matthews, and Jayna Elise	"Teenage Dream" "Dark Horse" "California Gurls"
Abi Carter	"What Was I Made For?"

== Elimination chart ==
Color key:

Winner
Runner-up
Third place
Did not perform
Saved by the public
Saved by the judges
Eliminated

American Idol (season 22) - Eliminations
Contestant	Pl.	Top 24		Top 20	Top 14	Top 12	Top 10	Top 8	Top 7	Top 5	Finale
Contestant	Pl.	4/7	4/8	4/14	4/21	4/22	4/28	4/29	5/5	5/12	5/19
Abi Carter	1	Safe	N/A	Safe	Safe	Safe	Safe	Safe	Safe	Safe	Winner
Will Moseley	2	Safe	N/A	Safe	Safe	Safe	Safe	Safe	Safe	Safe	Runner-up
Jack Blocker	3	N/A	Safe	Safe	Safe	Safe	Safe	Safe	Safe	Safe	Third place
Emmy Russell	4	N/A	Safe	Safe	Safe	Safe	Safe	Safe	Safe	Eliminated	
Triston Harper	4	N/A	Safe	Safe	Safe	Safe	Safe	Safe	Safe	Eliminated	
Julia Gagnon	6	Safe	N/A	Safe	Safe	Safe	Safe	Safe	Eliminated		
McKenna Faith Breinholt	6	Safe	N/A	Safe	Safe	Safe	Safe	Saved	Eliminated		
Kaibrienne	8	Safe	N/A	Safe	Safe	Safe	Safe	Eliminated			
KAYKO	9	Safe	N/A	Safe	Safe	Safe	Eliminated				
Mia Matthews	9	N/A	Safe	Safe	Safe	Safe	Eliminated				
Jayna Elise	11	Safe	N/A	Saved	Safe	Eliminated					
Roman Collins	11	N/A	Safe	Saved	Safe	Eliminated					
Jordan Anthony	13	Safe	N/A	Saved	Eliminated						
Nya	13	Safe	N/A	Saved	Eliminated						
Ajii		N/A	Safe	Eliminated							
Odell Bunton Jr.		N/A	Safe	Eliminated							
Jennifer Jeffries		N/A	Safe	Eliminated							
Quintavious		Safe	N/A	Eliminated							
Kennedy Reid		N/A	Safe	Eliminated							
Mackenzie Sol		N/A	Safe	Eliminated							
Elleigh Marie		N/A	Eliminated								
KBlocks		N/A	Eliminated								
Hailey Mia		Eliminated									
Blake Proehl		Eliminated									

== Ratings ==
Viewership and ratings per episode of American Idol season 22
No.	Title	Air date	Timeslot (ET)	Rating/share (18–49)	Viewers (millions)
1	"Auditions, Part 1"	February 18, 2024	Sunday 8:00 p.m.	0.6/6	4.62
2	"Auditions, Part 2"	February 25, 2024	Sunday 8:00 p.m.	0.6/6	4.79
3	"Auditions, Part 3"	March 3, 2024	Sunday 8:00 p.m.	0.6/7	5.11
4	"Auditions, Part 4"	March 17, 2024	Sunday 8:00 p.m.	0.5/6	4.79
5	"Auditions, Part 5"	March 24, 2024	Sunday 8:00 p.m.	0.4/4	4.25
6	"Hollywood Week - Idol Arena"	March 31, 2024	Sunday 8:00 p.m.	0.6/6	4.40
7	"Showstopper/Final Judgment"	April 1, 2024	Monday 8:00 p.m.	0.4/4	3.88
8	"Top 24 at Disney's Aulani Resort in Hawaii Part #1"	April 7, 2024	Sunday 8:00 p.m.	0.5/5	4.36
9	"Top 24 at Disney's Aulani Resort in Hawaii Part #2"	April 8, 2024	Monday 8:00 p.m.	0.5/5	4.15
10	"Top 20"	April 14, 2024	Sunday 8:00 p.m.	0.5/6	4.24
11	"Top 14 Reveal"	April 15, 2024	Monday 8:00 p.m.	0.4/4	3.94
12	"Rock & Roll Hall of Fame"	April 21, 2024	Sunday 8:00 p.m.	0.5/5	5.13
13	"Billboard #1 Hits"	April 22, 2024	Monday 8:00 p.m.	0.4/4	4.16
14	"Top 10" / "Shania Twain Mentors the Top 10 on Songs From Their Year of Birth"	April 28, 2024	Sunday 8:00 p.m.	0.6/7	5.31
15	"Judge's Song Contest"	April 29, 2024	Monday 8:00 p.m.	0.5/5	4.62
16	"Adele Night"	May 5, 2024	Sunday 8:00 p.m.	0.5/6	4.96
17	"Disney Night"	May 12, 2024	Sunday 8:00 p.m.	0.6/7	5.22
18	"Grand Finale"	May 19, 2024	Sunday 8:00 p.m.	0.7/7	5.64
