= Goodnight Goodnight =

Single by Hot Hot Heat

from the album Elevator
- B-side: "When We Were Kids"
- Released: May 16, 2005
- Genre: Indie rock
- Length: 2:10
- Label: B-Unique Records
- Songwriters: Steve Bays, Dante DeCaro, Paul Hawley, Dustin Hawthorne

Hot Hot Heat singles chronology
| "Island of the Honest Man" (2005) | "Goodnight Goodnight" (2005) | "Middle of Nowhere" (2005) |

Music video
- "Goodnight Goodnight" on YouTube

"Goodnight Goodnight" is a song by Canadian indie rock band Hot Hot Heat and is from their second album, Elevator. The song was released in the UK and US as the first single from Elevator on May 16, 2005. It reached number 36 in the UK Singles Chart. and number 27 on the Modern Rock Tracks chart in the U.S.

== Charts ==
=== Weekly charts ===
Weekly chart performance for "Goodnight Goodnight"
| Chart (2005) | Peak position |
|---|---|
| Canada Rock Top 30 (Radio & Records) | 20 |
| Scotland Singles (OCC) | 33 |
| UK Singles (OCC) | 36 |
| US Bubbling Under Hot 100 (Billboard) | 2 |
| US Digital Song Sales (Billboard) | 59 |
| US Alternative Airplay (Billboard) | 27 |

=== Year-end charts ===
Year-end chart performance for "Goodnight Goodnight"
| Chart (2005) | Position |
|---|---|
| US Modern Rock Tracks (Billboard) | 98 |
