= Get Us Out of Here =

Studio album by Freur
- Released: 1986
- Genres: New wave; synth-pop
- Length: 41:47
- Label: CBS Records
- Producers: Freur; John Hudson

Freur chronology
Doot-Doot (1983)	Get Us Out of Here (1986)

Singles from Get Us Out of Here
- 1. "The Devil and Darkness" Released: 1984; 2. "Look in the Back for Answers" Released: 1985; 3. "The Piano Song" Released: 1986

Professional ratings
Review scores
Source	Rating
AllMusic	Get Us Out of Here
AllMusic	Get Us Out of Here/Doot Doot

Get Us Out of Here is the second and final studio album by Freur and was released in the Netherlands and Germany in 1986. The cassette version of the album included five extra tracks.

== CD release ==
The album was unavailable on CD until 2009 when Cherry Red Records released Get Us out of Here/Doot-Doot, which includes both Freur albums on one CD. In order to fit both albums onto one CD over two minutes of music has been removed from Get Us out of Here; with the tracks "Emeralds and Pearls", "The Devil and Darkness", "The Piano Song", "Happiness" and "Endless Groove" all being faded out prematurely.

== Track listing ==
All songs written and composed by Karl Hyde, Rick Smith and Alfie Thomas, except where noted.

=== CBS Records LP: CBS 26328 ===
Side one
No.	Title	Writer(s)	Length
1.	"Look in the Back for Answers"		4:31
2.	"Emeralds and Pearls"		5:17
3.	"Kiss Me"		3:48
4.	"A.O.K.O."	Freur	3:15
5.	"The Devil and Darkness"		4:38

Side two
No.	Title	Length
1.	"The Piano Song"	4:23
2.	"Happiness"	4:01
3.	"Endless Groove"	3:25
4.	"This Is the Way I'd Like to Live My Life"	3:41
5.	"Bella Donna"	4:48

=== CBS Records Cassette: 40-26328 ===
Get Us Out of Here: Side one
No.	Title	Writer(s)	Length
1.	"Look in the Back for Answers"		4:34
2.	"Emeralds and Pearls"		5:19
3.	"Kiss Me"		3:50
4.	"A.O.K.O."	Freur	3:18
5.	"The Devil and Darkness"		4:41
6.	"Jazz Is King?"		8:28
7.	"Major Motion"		4:31
8.	"This Is the Way"		1:32

Get Us Out of Here: Side two
No.	Title	Length
1.	"The Piano Song"	4:25
2.	"Happiness"	4:03
3.	"Endless Groove"	3:28
4.	"This Is the Way I'd Like to Live My Life"	3:43
5.	"Bella Donna"	4:49
6.	"Innocence"	6:08
7.	"Get Us Out of Here"	0:25

=== 2009 – Cherry Red Records CD: CDM RED 419^{*} ===
Get Us Out of Here/Doot-Doot
No.	Title	Writer(s)	Length
1.	"Look in the Back for Answers"		4:34
2.	"Emeralds and Pearls"		4:44
3.	"Kiss Me"		3:50
4.	"A.O.K.O."	Freur	3:19
5.	"The Devil and Darkness"		4:08
6.	"The Piano Song"		4:04
7.	"Happiness"		3:17
8.	"Endless Groove"		3:04
9.	"This Is the Way I'd Like to Live My Life"		3:43
10.	"Bella Donna"		4:50
Total length:			39:32

^{*} Tracks 11–20 taken from the album Doot-Doot

== Personnel ==
=== Musicians ===
- Karl Hyde – vocals, guitar
- Bryn Burrows – drums
- Rick Smith – keyboards
- Alfie Thomas – bass, keyboards
- John Warwicker – keyboards

=== Additional musicians ===
- Mr. Bowie – Fretless bass
- Andy Sheppard – Tenor saxophone and soprano saxophone

=== Production ===
- Produced by Freur and John Hudson
- "Jazz Is King?", "Major Motion", "This Is the Way" and "Get Us Out Of Here" produced by Freur
