= Let Me In (soundtrack) =

Let Me In: Original Motion Picture Soundtrack

Soundtrack album by Michael Giacchino
- Released: October 12, 2010
- Studios: Northwest Sinfonia, Seattle, Washington
- Genres: Soundtrack, film score
- Length: 78:03
- Label: Varèse Sarabande
- Producers: Philip Moross, Michael Giacchino

Michael Giacchino chronology
Earth Days (2009)	Let Me In: Original Motion Picture Soundtrack (2010)	Cars 2 (2011)

Let Me In: Original Motion Picture Soundtrack is a soundtrack album and film score for the film of the same name. It was released by Varèse Sarabande on October 12, 2010 and was recorded at Northwest Sinfonia in Seattle, Washington State. The soundtrack was composed and arranged by Academy Award winner Michael Giacchino.

== Track listing ==
No.	Title	Length
1.	"Hammertime"	0:58
2.	"Los Alamos"	2:17
3.	"Sins of the Father"	2:16
4.	"Peeping Owen"	4:05
5.	"Bully Thy Name"	1:32
6.	"The Back Seat Killer"	1:39
7.	"The Blood Flood"	1:39
8.	"The Asphalt Jungle Gym"	5:33
9.	"At Your Disposal"	4:32
10.	"Neighbors of Love"	3:06
11.	"First Date Jitters"	2:53
12.	"Killer In-Stinks"	2:21
13.	"Acid Test Dummy"	1:04
14.	"Visitation Rights"	5:09
15.	"New Day On an Old Lake"	1:39
16.	"Polling for Owen"	2:34
17.	"Owen Remember Thy Swashing Blow"	1:17
18.	"Blood by Any Other Name"	1:37
19.	"Regarding Evil"	3:47
20.	"Let Me Out"	1:17
21.	"Virginia Territory"	1:42
22.	"Invitation Only"	2:11
23.	"Dread On Arrival"	6:13
24.	"Parting Sorrows"	2:55
25.	"The Weakest Goes to the Pool"	3:42
26.	"Trained and Steady (Film Version)"	2:13
27.	"End Credits"	6:02
28.	"Trained and Steady (Original Track)"	2:15
Total length:		78:03

=== Songs featured in the film, but not on the soundtrack ===
In addition to the musical score, several songs from the 1980s can be heard through the film.

- The Greg Kihn Band - "The Breakup Song (They Don't Write 'Em)"
- Blue Öyster Cult - "Burnin' for You"
- Culture Club - "Do You Really Want to Hurt Me"
- Culture Club - "Time (Clock of the Heart)"
- Freur - "Doot-Doot"
- The Vapors - "Turning Japanese"
- David Bowie - "Let's Dance"

The classic Now and Later advertisement song is also heard a few times throughout the movie.
