= Happiness Ltd. =

Studio album by Hot Hot Heat
- Released: September 10, 2007 (U.K.)
- Recorded: 2006–2007
- Genre: Alternative rock, art punk
- Length: 40:03
- Label: Sire/Warner
- Producer: Rob Cavallo, Butch Walker, Steve Bays, Eric Valentine, Tim Palmer, Hot Hot Heat

Hot Hot Heat chronology
Elevator (2005)	Happiness Ltd. (2007)	Future Breeds (2010)

Singles from Album
- 1. "Give Up?" Released: 2007; 2. "Let Me In" Released: 2007; 3. "Harmonicas & Tambourines" Released: 2007

Professional ratings
Review scores
Source	Rating
AllMusic	3/5 stars
Blender	2/5 stars
NME	(7/10)
Pitchfork	(5.0/10)
Spin	3/5 stars

Happiness Ltd. is the third studio album, and second major release since signing with Sire Records by Hot Hot Heat. The album was released on September 11, 2007. It is their first album without original member Dante DeCaro.

The song "5 Times Out of 100" originally appeared on Hot Hot Heat's earlier release, Knock Knock Knock. The album was also released as a Deluxe Limited Edition with a bonus DVD containing the fifty-minute "Harmonicas and Tambourines" making-of documentary.

== Track listing ==
No.	Title	Length
1.	"Happiness Ltd."	4:35
2.	"Let Me In"	4:15
3.	"5 Times Out of 100"	3:01
4.	"Harmonicas & Tambourines"	3:05
5.	"Outta Heart"	4:12
6.	"My Best Fiend"	2:53
7.	"Conversation"	2:38
8.	"Give Up?"	3:34
9.	"Good Day to Die"	3:18
10.	"So So Cold"	4:07
11.	"Waiting for Nothing"	4:30
