= Elevator (Hot Hot Heat album) =

Studio album by Hot Hot Heat
- Released: April 4, 2005
- Recorded: Summer 2004
- Studios: Sound City (Los Angeles), Larrabee East (Hollywood Hills)
- Genre: Indie rock
- Length: 37:47
- Label: Sire
- Producer: Dave Sardy

Hot Hot Heat chronology
Make Up the Breakdown (2002)	Elevator (2005)	Happiness Ltd. (2007)

Professional ratings
Review scores
Source	Rating
Allmusic	3/5 stars
Blender	4/5 stars
PopMatters	(6/10)
Pitchfork	(5.3/10)
Rolling Stone	3.5/5 stars
Absolutepunk.net	(8/10)
Spin	7/10 stars
Stylus Magazine	C

Elevator is Hot Hot Heat's second studio album, released on April 4, 2005 internationally and a day later on April 5 in the United States, with an April 25 release in the UK. It ranked #57 in Amazon.com's Top 100 Editor's Picks of 2005.

It is the band's last album to feature original guitarist Dante DeCaro, who left after the recording of this album.

== Track listing ==
No.	Title	Length
1.	"Introduction"	0:17
2.	"Running Out of Time"	2:45
3.	"Goodnight Goodnight"	2:10
4.	"Ladies and Gentleman"	2:55
5.	"You Owe Me an IOU"	3:04
6.	"No Jokes - Fact"	0:39
7.	"Jingle Jangle"	3:55
8.	"Pickin' It Up"	2:34
9.	"Island of the Honest Man"	3:02
10.	"Middle of Nowhere"	4:01
11.	"Dirty Mouth"	2:44
12.	"Soldier in a Box"	3:05
13.	"Four Seconds of Noise"	0:04
14.	"Shame on You"	2:45
15.	"Elevator"	3:47

Both the back cover of the album and the liner notes list the songs in reverse order. Thus, the track numbers appear as they would in an elevator, with 1 at the bottom, 15 at the top, and a missing thirteenth track, like a missing thirteenth floor button in an elevator. The album's cover does not list track 13, listing 12 then 14. There is a track 13 on the album, sometimes titled "Four Seconds of Noise", which is merely the final four seconds of the ending guitar riff from "Soldier in a Box".

Track 5 "You Owe Me an IOU" is featured in the soundtrack of MVP Baseball 2005. Track 8 "Pickin' It Up" was used in the soundtrack of Madden NFL 06 and SSX on Tour.

== Personnel ==
Hot Hot Heat

- Steve Bays – vocals, piano, organ
- Paul Hawley – drums, percussion, guitar (tracks 5, 6, & 10), acoustic guitar (tracks 11 & 15)
- Dante DeCaro – guitars
- Dustin Hawthorne – bass guitar

Additional personnel

- D. Sardy – producer, mixing, additional percussion and guitar
- Greg Gordon – engineer
- Ryan Castle – editing
- Warren Huart – editing
- Stephen Marcussen – mastering
- Craig Aaronson – A&R
- Rebel Waltz, Inc. – management
- Stephen Walker – artwork, art direction, design
- Phil Knott – artwork, design, photography
- John Hobbs – artwork, design

== Charts ==
=== Album ===
Chart performance for Elevator
Chart	Peak position
German Albums (Offizielle Top 100)	92
Scottish Albums (Official Charts)	31
UK Albums (Official Charts)	34
US Billboard 200	34

=== Singles ===
Single	Chart	Peak
"Goodnight, Goodnight"	UK Singles (Official Charts)	36
"Middle of Nowhere"	UK Singles (Official Charts)	47
