= Abi Carter =

American singer (born 2002)

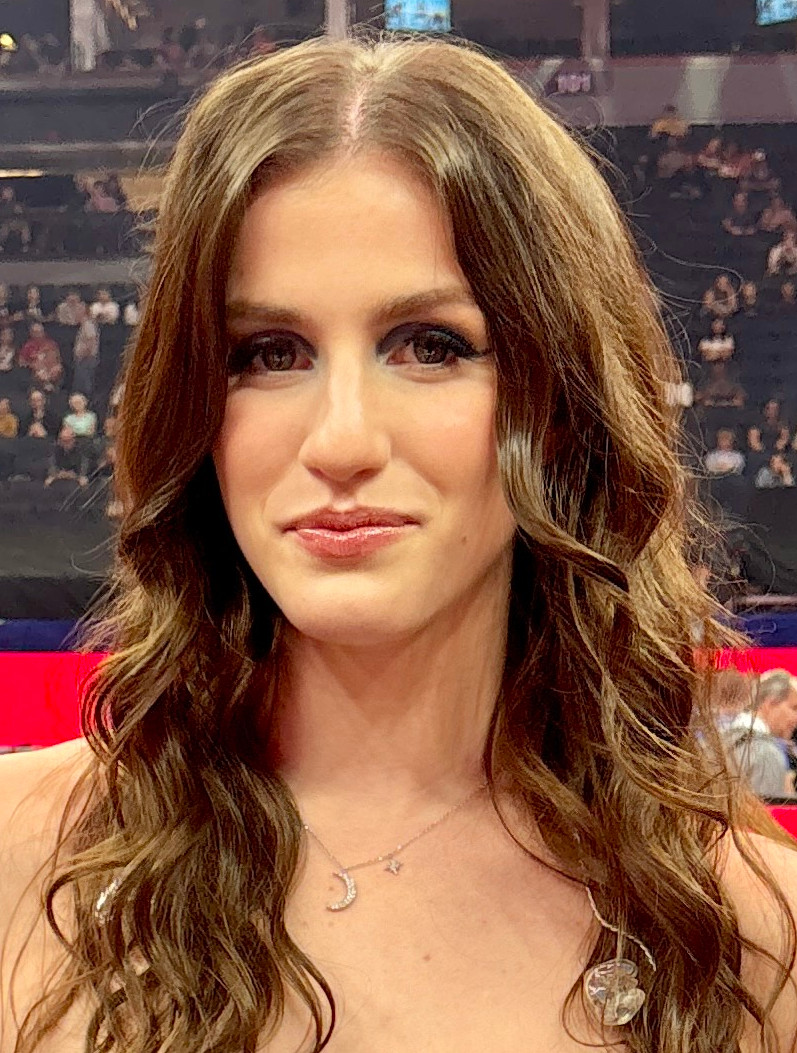
- Carter at the 2024 U.S. gymnastics Olympic trials

Background information
- Born: Abigail Carter; July 31, 2002 (age 23); Indio, California, U.S.
- Genres: Pop, indie-pop
- Occupation: Singer
- Years active: 2023–present
- Website: abicartermusic.com

Abigail Carter (born July 31, 2002) is an American singer who won season 22 of American Idol in 2024. She was the first woman in four years and the first platinum ticket recipient to win the competition. She is from Indio, California, and graduated summa cum laude from Cal State San Bernardino, Palm Desert Campus, with a bachelor's degree in Marriage & Family Therapy.

== Early life and education ==
Carter was born on July 31, 2002, and raised in Indio, California. She is the second oldest of seven children in a "very religious family" and grew up with a single mother, Andrea Engel Carter. She has three sisters and three brothers, one of whom, Daniel, is a YouTube video creator.

Carter says that her mother has always supported her in music; Andrea bought Abi her first keyboard. Abi began private piano lessons when she was 7 or 8; Marta Basham, her former piano teacher, spoke to the press and was in the audience for an American Idol show. Referring to her mother's help, Carter told the Coachella Valley Weekly that she "wouldn't be the person I am today without her guiding me along the way".

Carter said that when she was about 11, while cleaning her house, she was listening to "Battle Scars" by Guy Sebastian and Lupe Fiasco. At the time, she noticed patterns in music and music theory principles in pop music. Since then, she has continued playing by ear and improvising.

Carter went to school at George Washington Charter School in Palm Desert, California until third grade and then was homeschooled. She attended La Quinta High School in La Quinta, California, for less than a semester and returned to being homeschooled. About that time, her parents separated. She said that she left high school so that she could also work part-time, help care for her siblings, buy a car, and chauffeur her siblings to school and appointments.

Carter finished high school early and studied psychology at California State University, San Bernardino, Palm Desert campus. In May 2023, she graduated summa cum laude with a bachelor's degree in Marriage & Family Therapy. She was planning to pursue a master's degree next but chose to first devote a year to her music, hoping to make it a career.

== Before Idol ==
In 2016, Carter and her mother, who is also a singer, performed for the McCallum Theatre's Open Call Talent Competition, an annual event in Palm Desert. Abi was 13 and her mother 35, and they won "Best Vocal Act" that year. She tried out for Open Call to help her mother overcome her stage fright. Abi has been an Open Call finalist five times.

When Carter was 19, she decided to devote more time to her passion for music, so she quit her job as a gymnastics instructor and started busking. She also gained valuable experience performing at country clubs in the Coachella Valley, as well as bars such as Tommy Bahama Marlin Bar in Palm Springs and Kitchen 86 + Bar in Palm Desert, the "first restaurant that hired her to play music". Her goal was to earn a living by singing, and when local restaurant owners encouraged her to sing in their restaurants, she thought she had reached her goal.

Carter also performed at VillageFest, a weekly street fair in downtown Palm Springs. When she first began playing at VillageFest, she started with "12-30 songs" she already knew and just "played them on repeat for four hours straight". Then she began to realize she knew more songs and "actually could play anything that people asked for as long as I had heard it before. I didn't know I could do that."

When some social media videos of her playing were well-received, Carter was pleasantly surprised and encouraged, so she decided to post cover videos to see what would happen. When she posted a video of her singing the 2023 song "Vampire", by Olivia Rodrigo, American Idol casting producer Ariel Panzer saw the video and invited her to audition for the show. After a couple Zoom meetings with American Idol producers, she decided to audition in Santa Barbara, and, as she puts it, "The rest is history."

== American Idol contest ==
In late 2023, after the judges had listened to two days of auditions, Carter performed as the last person of the Los Angeles auditions. She sang Billie Eilish's "What Was I Made For?", a rendition that impressed all three judges, with Lionel Richie declaring, "We don't have to vote." Wide Open Country reported that she made the song personal by adding complex runs to the melody and using her falsetto range. When she finished the song, Katy Perry approached her and said, "Thank you for being an example of singing from your heart. What were you made for? You were made for this. One hundred percent." Luke Bryan said to Lionel Richie, "That may be the winner of American Idol." Perry turned around and said to Bryan: "Luke, she's Top 10, right?" Richie and Bryan agreed that Carter could win the show. Bryan also mentioned that he had never heard the show's crew clap before. Richie said to Carter's family: "That's the best we've ever heard on this show. ... I'm not kidding." Carter was awarded a golden ticket without the judges voting, and a week later her golden ticket was upgraded to a platinum ticket.

On March 23, 2024, Carter's first concert was held in her home town of Indio. It was a fundraising event where nearly 1,000 people attended.

On April 7, 2024, after making it into the Top 24, she sang "Oceans (Where Feet May Fail)" by Hillsong United. Perry told Carter, "I don’t know if I'm allowed to say it, but you're my favorite. I just think you're so gifted."

In the Top 20, Carter sang a slowed-down version of "Welcome to the Black Parade" by My Chemical Romance, and Perry cried a little during the song. Carter sang the song as a tribute to her grandfather, who died in 2021, and to her grandmother, who died after American Idol filmed in Kapolei, Hawaii.

In an interview after she had made it into the Top 3, when Carter was asked if there was a particular performance she was most proud of, she mentioned two songs: her audition performance of "What Was I Made For?" because the song relates to her true identity as a performer; and "Bring Me to Life" because it helped her to perform outside her normal comfort zone and discover many layers of herself.

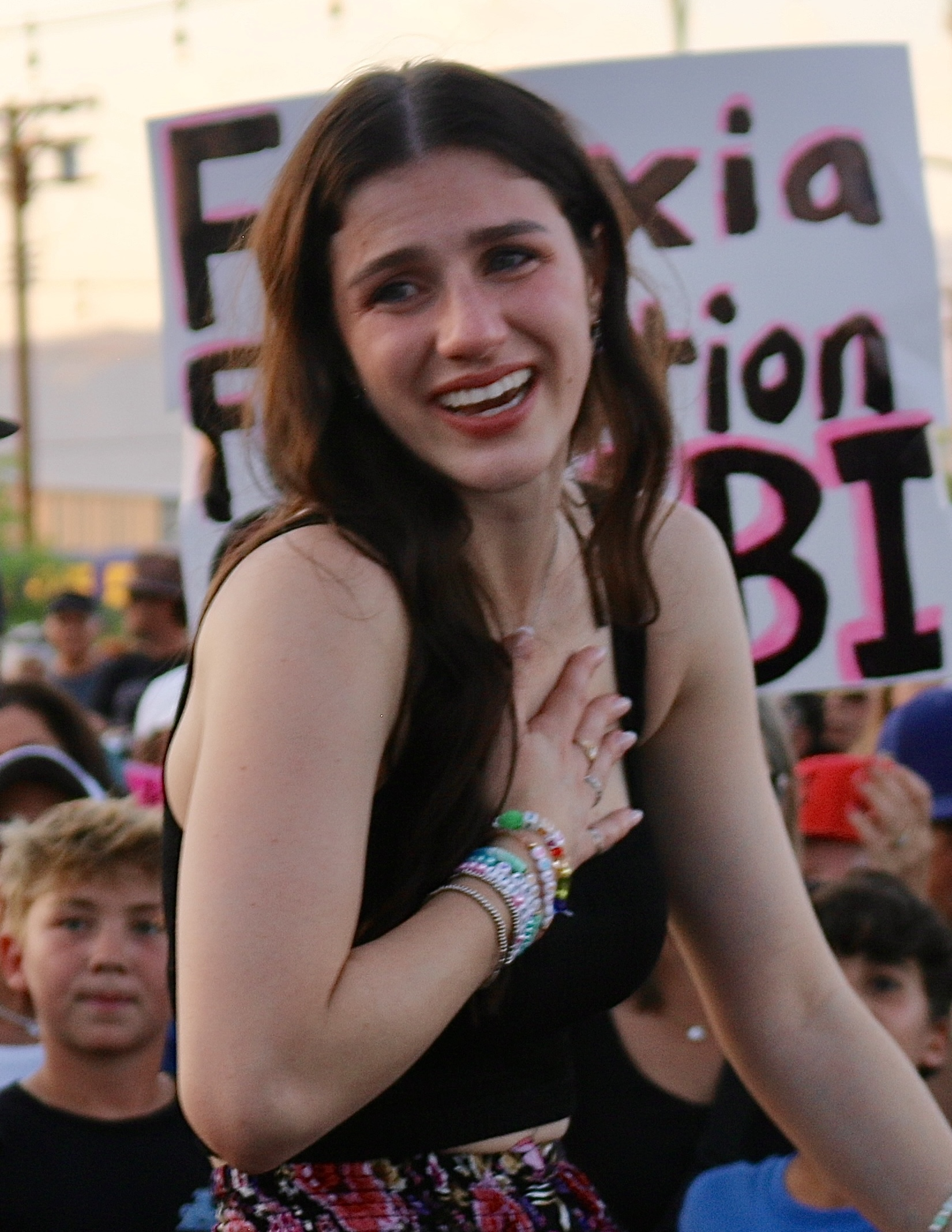
Carter at her American Idol "Hometown Visit" parade in Indio in May 2024

A hometown visit is a tradition for the Top 3 contestants, with a parade and concert, and one stop in the Coachella Valley was at her old school, George Washington Charter School. She described the impact of her story on children:

'I looked at all these little kids and I remembered when I was a little kid in that same room, auditioning for my very first talent show. I just kind of thought to myself, if somebody from my same background came to my school when I was a kid and basically told me that what I wanted to do in the future was possible from where I'm at, I might have done it sooner. I might have been more confident, I might have not wasted time thinking that my life would never go further than where I was at,' Carter said. 'To be that for some kids was incredible to me.'

During the Grand Finale, Billie Eilish expressed her love and support for Carter in a prerecorded video message:

Hi Abi, it's Billie. I wanted to say congratulations for making the 'Top 3' on American Idol. This is such a big deal. I'm so happy for you. It's so amazing to see you in the finale after you sang my song, 'What Was I Made For?' in your audition. I love you so much. I wish you nothing but the best, and I just can't wait to see what happens tonight. I'm here to support you forever, and I love ya. Have fun.

Carter sang three songs in the season finale of the contest, ending with her original song, "This Isn't Over". On May 19, 2024, Carter became the season 22 winner and sang "What Was I Made For?" again. Will Moseley came in second and Jack Blocker finished in third place. Carter is the first recipient of a platinum ticket to win the competition, the first woman in four years to win, and the eighth female winner overall. Immediately after her win, Bryan said to Carter: "I think this is the first time the person that we thought was gonna be the winner actually was."

Carter was frequently predicted to become one of the Top 3 contestants or possibly even the final winner. Parade Magazine wrote: "The bottom line is that any of the three could win it and be deserving of the honor, but my prediction is it should be Abi. As stated above, she's got it all, she's the whole package, and most importantly, enough experience to go with it."

American Idol season 22 performances and results
Episode	Theme	Song choice	Original artist	Order number	Result
Auditions Episode #2	N/A	"What Was I Made For?" (from Barbie)	Billie Eilish	N/A	Advanced
Hollywood Round (Platinum Ticket Trio Bonus Performance)	N/A	"California Dreamin'" (w/ Julia Gagnon & Odell Bunton Jr.)	The Mamas & the Papas	N/A	Advanced
Showstoppers/Green Mile	N/A	"If I Could Turn Back Time"	Cher	N/A	Advanced
Top 24 — Monday, Part 2 (April 8)	Contestant's Choice	"Oceans (Where Feet May Fail)"	Hillsong United	8	Advanced
Top 20 (April 14 – Voting)	Contestant's Choice	"Welcome to the Black Parade"	My Chemical Romance	17	Advanced
Top 20 (April 15 – Results)	Victory/WildCard Songs	"My Mind"	Yebba	12	Advanced
Top 14 (April 21)	Rock & Roll Hall of Fame	"Goodbye Yellow Brick Road"	Elton John	12	Advanced
Top 12 (April 22)	Billboard #1 Hits	"All Too Well"	Taylor Swift	1	Advanced
Top 10 (April 28)	Year You Were Born	"Clocks"	Coldplay	2	Advanced
Top 8 (April 29)	Judges' Song Contest	"Bring Me to Life" (selected by Katy Perry)	Evanescence	7	Advanced
Top 8 (April 29)	Judges' Song Contest	"Wide Awake" (w/ Julia Gagnon, Kaibrienne, & McKenna Faith Breinholt)	Katy Perry	9	Advanced
Top 7 (May 5)	Dance Songs / Adele	"My Songs Know What You Did in the Dark (Light 'em Up)"	Fall Out Boy	3	Advanced
Top 7 (May 5)	Dance Songs / Adele	"Hello"	Adele	14	Advanced
Top 5 (May 12)	Disney Night	"Part of Your World" (from The Little Mermaid)	Jodi Benson	1	Advanced
Top 5 (May 12)	Disney Night	"The Chain" (from Guardians of the Galaxy Vol. 2)	Fleetwood Mac	8	Advanced
Top 3 — Grand Finale (May 18)	Bon Jovi / Hometown Dedication / Winner's Single	"Bed of Roses"	Bon Jovi	3	Winner
Top 3 — Grand Finale (May 18)	Bon Jovi / Hometown Dedication / Winner's Single	"Somewhere (There's a Place for Us)" (from West Side Story)	Reri Grist	6	Winner
Top 3 — Grand Finale (May 18)	Bon Jovi / Hometown Dedication / Winner's Single	"This Isn't Over"	Abi Carter	8	Winner

== After Idol ==
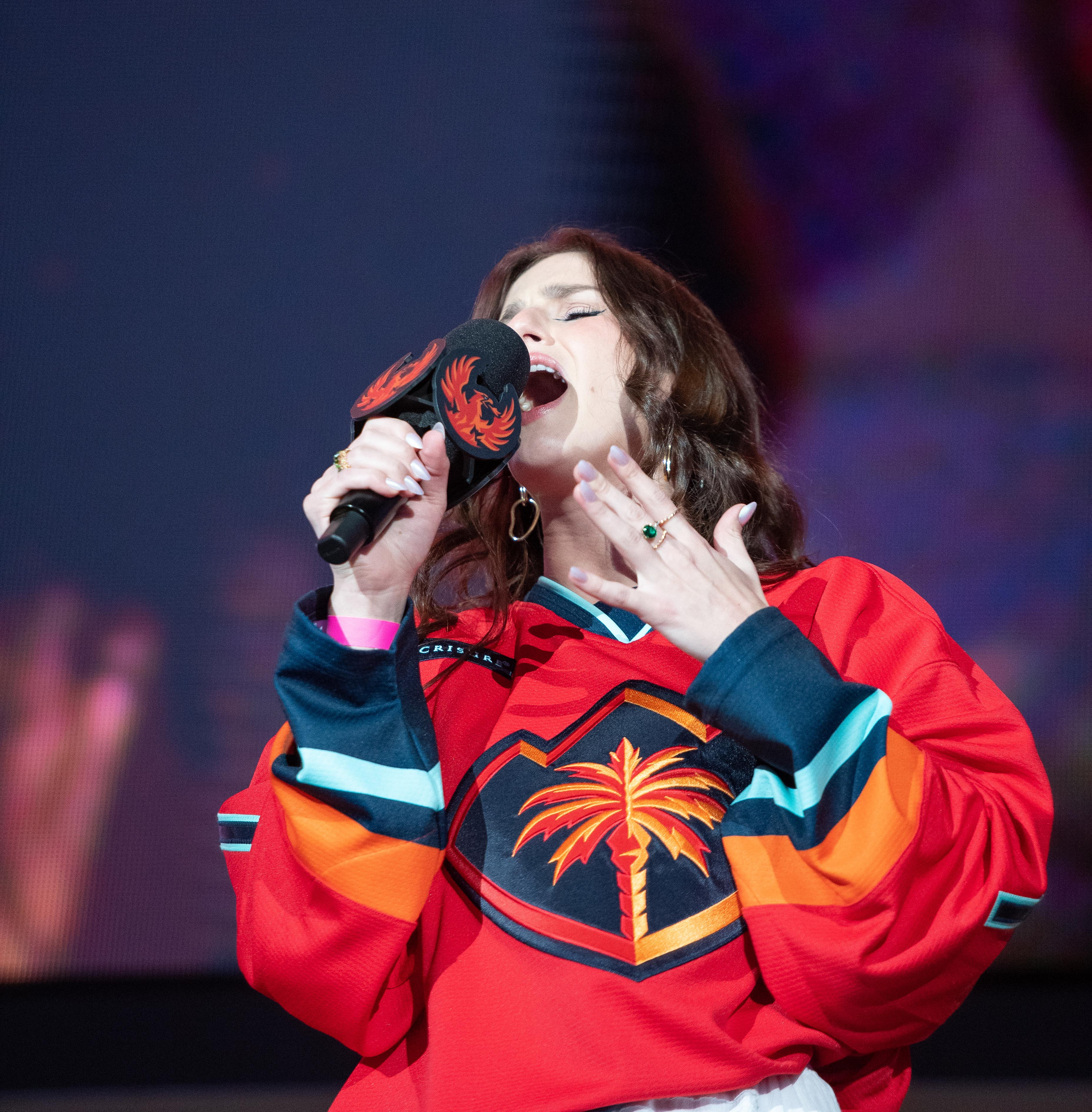
Carter performs at Game 4 of the 2024 Calder Cup finals

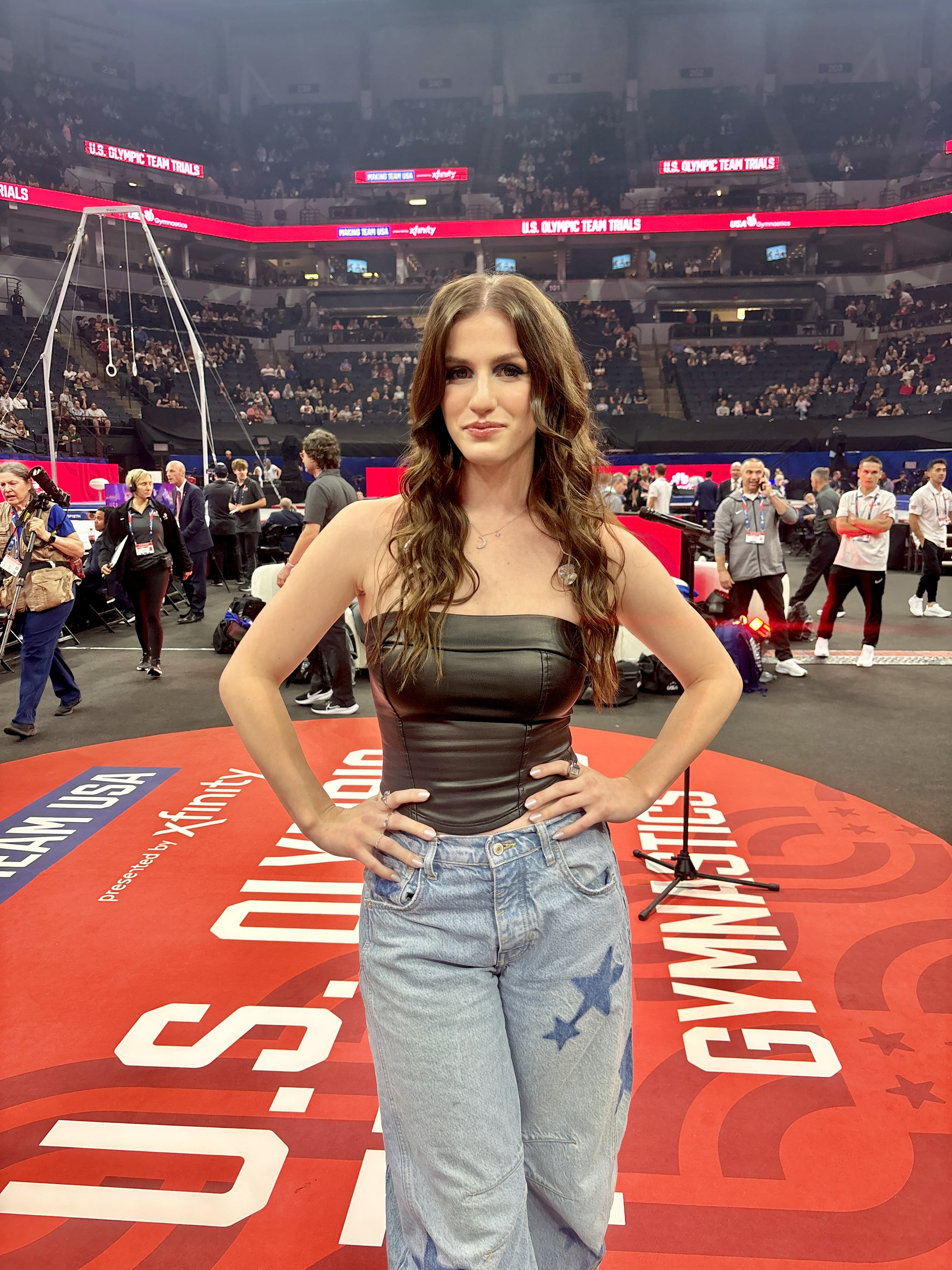
Carter sang the national anthem at the 2024 U.S. gymnastics Olympic trials

After her win on May 19, 2024, she was flown to New York City for a publicity tour. There she was able to take in a Broadway theatre show. She also appeared on Good Morning America and Live with Kelly and Mark, where she performed her new single, "This Isn't Over", and revealed she had expected Will Moseley to win, describing him as "amazing". She also sang and threw out the ceremonial first pitch at a New York Mets baseball game.

On May 31, 2024, her first time returning home after her win, Carter sang "The Star-Spangled Banner" and dropped the ceremonial first puck at the opening of a hockey game between the Coachella Valley Firebirds and the Milwaukee Admirals at the Acrisure Arena in the Coachella Valley.

On June 20, 2024, Carter performed during the first intermission of the American Hockey League Calder Cup playoffs for her hometown team, the Coachella Valley Firebirds, where she also announced her first full concert would be held at Acrisure Arena on July 27. On June 27, she sang the national anthem at the 2024 United States Olympic trials for gymnastics.

On July 27, 2024, Carter held her first full concert, "No Amount of Dark", at Acrisure Arena, with Canadian pop singer Laur Elle as the concert's opening act. It was described as a "stellar" performance. The concert's title comes from the lyrics of one of her songs. She sang her recent singles, covers of popular songs, and some unreleased songs.

On August 10, 2024, Carter performed a cover of Madonna's "Like a Prayer" alongside Deadpool for D23: The Official Disney Fan Club.

Carter's first full album, Ghosts in the Backyard (often stylized in all lowercase), came out on November 15, 2024. She shared that the album is about missing childhood. Carter sang at the Stagecoach Festival in Indio on April 25, 2025. That same day she released a deluxe edition of Ghosts in the Backyard, which features two new songs and a remix of "Comfortably Numb" with Laur Elle.

Carter is still an independent musician and has not yet signed with a record label: "I am currently independent, and I think that that's a big reason as to why I'm able to find myself and have complete creative freedom. Someday I hope to be with a record label, but I feel like I need to find the right one."

== Musical style ==
Carter's original music draws on the genres of indie-pop, folk, and cinematic drama. She has stated that she dislikes hyper-specific lyrics, instead preferring lyrical content "that can transcend across the experiences of so many." Her musical influences include Taylor Swift, Sara Bareilles, Gracie Abrams, Lizzy McAlpine, Carrie Underwood, My Chemical Romance, Paramore, Phoebe Bridgers, Renee Rapp, and Billie Eilish, whom she has been a fan of since she was a young teenager. Her favorite American Idol alums are Kelly Clarkson, Carrie Underwood, David Archuleta, Adam Lambert, and Jordin Sparks. She has also named Manchester Orchestra as an inspiration. Her favorite karaoke song is "Bring Me to Life" by Evanescence.

== Public image ==
Katy Perry said her "voice is unlike anything I've heard in pop music" and compared Carter to Ariana Grande, whom Perry considers "the best singer of our generation".

== Personal life ==
Carter is in a romantic relationship with Cooper McCollum from Allen, Texas.

After American Idol, she moved to Los Angeles, where she is writing songs and working in studios with writers.

== Discography ==
=== First releases ===
- "It's All Love" (lyric video) "All the good and the bad give you the ability to truly appreciate life and recognize that at the end of the day, everything you experience is just what makes life wonderful."
- "This Isn't Over" (music video), (lyric video) "tells a story about personal growth, becoming a stronger person and wanting to tell one's younger self that it's not over, even when it seems impossible to keep going."
- "Peppermint Sky" (music video) is "a love letter to the women who have inspired Abi".
- "Some People Need Drugs" (music video) is not "about drugs at all, but about an abusive relationship".
- "Comfortably Numb" (music video), (visualizer)

=== Ghosts In the Backyard ===
On November 15, 2024, her debut album, "Ghosts In the Backyard", was released. It has 10 tracks. Jesus Reyes wrote:

Carter explores the pains of growing up, fading relationships, and bittersweet memories that still linger and sting. Each track is a chapter in Carter's emotional journey, capturing the poignancy of moving forward without letting go of the past.

==== Track listing ====
No.	Title	Writer(s)	Length
1.	"The Lamppost"	Abi Carter, Justin Hergett, Edsel Holden	3:17
2.	"Maybe I Love You"	Abi Carter, Justin Hergett, Edsel Holden	2:55
3.	"Peppermint Sky"	Abi Carter, Michael Edwards, Holden Miller	3:12
4.	"Die In the Hills"	Abi Carter, Justin Hergett, Edsel Holden	3:18
5.	"Comfortably Numb"	Abi Carter, Laurel Clouston, Dave Burris	2:28
6.	"Some People Need Drugs"	Abi Carter, Michael Edwards, Holden Miller	3:36
7.	"I Don't Need Help"	Abi Carter, Justin Hergett, Edsel Holden	3:31
8.	"I Wish I Was a Farmer"	Abi Carter, Justin Hergett, Edsel Holden	3:20
9.	"You'll Wake Up Tomorrow"	Abi Carter, Justin Hergett, Edsel Holden	2:44
10.	"Ghosts In the Backyard"	Abi Carter, Justin Hergett, Edsel Holden	3:17
Total length:			31:38
