= Freur =

Welsh new wave/synth-pop band

- Origin: Cardiff, Wales
- Genres: New wave; synth-pop; art pop
- Years active: 1982–1986
- Label: CBS
- Spinoffs: Underworld
- Past members: Karl Hyde; Rick Smith; Alfie Thomas; John Warwicker; Bryn Burrows

Freur were a Welsh new wave and synth-pop band featuring Karl Hyde and Rick Smith, who went on to form the electronic band Underworld. It was their second band, following their art school collaboration, the Screen Gemz. Their best known song is "Doot-Doot", which peaked at No. 59 on the UK singles chart, but became a hit in New Zealand, where it reached number 17.

== History ==
Freur logo, as used on a test pressing of the "Doot Doot" 7". Note both rubber stamp of official designed logo, and handwritten version.

The band was formed in the early 1980s in Cardiff, Wales by Hyde, Smith and Alfie Thomas. It originally had only a graphic 'squiggle' for a name. In 1983, after recruiting John Warwicker and drummer Bryn Burrows (formerly of the Fabulous Poodles), they got a recording contract with CBS Records. As the label insisted on a pronounceable name, the band made the compromise that the squiggle was pronounced Freur.

Their first and only hit single (No. 17 in Italy, No. 17 in New Zealand, No. 24 in Germany, No. 36 in the Netherlands and No. 59 in the UK Singles Chart), was "Doot-Doot" (1983). The track was written in the style of popular synth-pop bands of the time, such as Tubeway Army, the Human League, Depeche Mode, Heaven 17 and Orchestral Manoeuvres in the Dark. It was recorded and co-produced by Alex Burak at The Point studio in London, which was controlled by Rupert Merton of Point Music publishing. Merton (who also had an early version of the Thompson Twins on his roster of artists) signed Freur.

The band released five further singles after "Doot-Doot", between 1983 and 1985: "Matters of the Heart", "Runaway", "Riders in the Night", "The Devil and Darkness" and "Look in the Back for Answers". All failed to dent the UK charts.

Freur released two studio albums: Doot-Doot (1983) and Get Us Out of Here (1986). The second LP was only released in Germany and the Netherlands. Freur also composed and performed the soundtrack to the movie Underworld (also called Transmutations), written by Clive Barker. Warwicker left the band in 1986 and Freur went into recess. In 1987, Hyde, Smith, Thomas and Burrows, along with bassist Baz Allen signed to Sire Records under a new name, Underworld, and found some success with the single "Underneath the Radar" (1988) (it peaked in Australia at No. 5), before initially folding in 1990. The band re-formed in 1991 under the same name to become the successful dance and electronica act responsible for a number of well received albums and the 1996 hit single "Born Slippy .NUXX".

The Guinness Book of British Hit Singles would list Freur under the symbol, with the translation by the side, until the late 1990s. John Warwicker is a video artist in the graphic design collective Tomato, whose founders include Hyde and Smith.

The now defunct UK magazine Sounds referred to the band as "Elephant with a stick of Rhubarb" because of the shape of the squiggle.

== Band members ==
- Karl Hyde – vocals, guitars
- Rick Smith – keyboards
- Alfie Thomas – bass, keyboards, guitars, back vocals
- Bryn Burrows – drums
- John Warwicker – video synthesiser, graphics

== Discography ==
=== Studio albums ===
- Doot-Doot (1983)
- Get Us Out of Here (1986)

=== Soundtrack albums ===
- Transmutations (1985) (unreleased)

=== Singles ===
Year	Title	UK	GER	NL	NZ	Album
1983	"Doot-Doot"	59	24	36	17	Doot-Doot
1983	"Runaway"	–	–	–	–	Doot-Doot
1983	"Matters of the Heart"	–	–	–	–	Doot-Doot
1983	"Riders in the Night"	–	–	–	–	Doot-Doot
1984	"The Devil and Darkness"	–	–	–	–	Get Us Out of Here
1985	"Look in the Back for Answers"	–	–	–	–	Get Us Out of Here
1986	"The Piano Song"	–	–	–	–	Get Us Out of Here
