= Cars 2 (soundtrack) =

Cars 2 (Original Motion Picture Soundtrack)

Soundtrack album by Michael Giacchino
- Released: June 14, 2011
- Recorded: 2010–2011
- Studios: Eastwood Scoring Stage, Warner Bros., Los Angeles, California; Eldorado Recording Studios, Burbank, California; Station West, Nashville, Tennessee; Blackbird, Nashville, Tennessee; The Pool House, Los Angeles; The Yellow House, Richmond, Virginia; Skywalker Sound, Skywalker Ranch, Lucas Valley, California; The Village, West Los Angeles, California; Capitol, Hollywood, California
- Genre: Soundtrack
- Length: 63:24
- Label: Walt Disney
- Producers: Michael Giacchino; Chris Montan

Michael Giacchino chronology
Let Me In (2010)	Cars 2 (2011)	Super 8 (2011)

Cars 2 (Original Motion Picture Soundtrack) is the soundtrack album to the 2011 Disney/Pixar film of the same name composed and arranged by Michael Giacchino. It was directed by John Lasseter, a sequel to Cars (2006) and the second film in the Cars franchise. The film is scored by Michael Giacchino in his only collaboration with Lasseter. The film marked Giacchino's fourth Pixar film after The Incredibles, Ratatouille and Up, which was also by Lasseter and also the fourth Pixar film not to be scored by Randy Newman or Thomas Newman. The score was recorded at the Eastwood Scoring Stage for over six to seven weeks, whereas the orchestra recording happened for six to eight days. The album was released by Walt Disney Records on June 14, 2011, ten days ahead of the film's release, and featured songs performed by Weezer, Robbie Williams, Brad Paisley and Perfume, with Giacchino's score accompanying the remainder of it.

== Development ==
Cars 2 is John Lasseter's only film not to be scored by his frequent collaborator Randy Newman, who also scored the predecessor. In October 2010, Michael Giacchino was hired to score music for the film, after previously working on Pixar's The Incredibles (2004), Ratatouille (2007) and Up (2009). He initially liked the music of the first film scored by Newman, and whenever he watched the film he felt that "he was in the middle of something important or big or something adventurous" and seeing the film, he felt it as a perfect fit. On watching several iterations of the final edit, he said "I've watched the film go through different phases, you know it changes, it evolves. you go through several versions of it to try and get to the best possible version of the story. So I've seen like four iterations of it as it goes."

"There's flavors of all that in there for sure, but for me the most important thing is that we stick with what's important for the characters at that moment. While there's going to be flavors of where they are, it's mostly going to be about them. The music is always hopefully what's going on inside their head as opposed to what's going on in the world outside of them. With music, you always want to be inside the character. You want to stick with them. When you get with the environment instead, it stops being about the characters and it stops being interesting."

— Michael Giacchino

The score had international flavors as most of it does center around Finn McMissile (Michael Caine), and the music echoes of Radiator Springs and other elements from the first film he did not want to lose. He admitted that there is a thematic element to the film that does develop as the film progresses. Especially to match McMissile's character, a successful spy in the 1960s in London, and he thought of the kind of music he listened for the film, which was surf music that became the centrepiece of the film as well as his identity. On the racing sequences, it had more showcasing racing and no guitar used in the film, if being used it is a combination of the "racing and something else is going on story-wise. So it all depends on what's happening with the story, how much or how little you use of that element."

He said that the score is really that surf thing, at its core and had elements such as "fun, action, emotion and friendship" which he liked, saying "You know with these movies, especially at Pixar, the core of the film is usually something very emotional and something that feels really real that you can relate to, it's not like done in a false way. You know a lot of films will treat emotion falsely and you can sense that very quickly, but these films have a way of pulling you in and making you care about these characters because they're treating them like real people, not like a cartoon or something to make fun of, they actually treat them as if they're real people, and I think that's great." As the film featured several cars, he did not want the music to be too overt with the film as it becomes more about the music than it does about the film, as he felt that he want the music to follow the characters.

The Newsboys song "City to City" was featured in the film albeit not credited in the soundtrack.

== Track listing ==
All music is composed by Michael Giacchino, except where noted.

Cars 2 (Original Motion Picture Soundtrack) track listing
No.	Title	Writer(s)	Artist(s)	Length
1.	"You Might Think" (Cover of The Cars)	Ric Ocasek	Weezer	3:07
2.	"Collision of Worlds"	Robbie Williams; Brad Paisley	Williams; Paisley	3:36
3.	"Mon Cœur Fait Vroum (My Heart Goes Vroom)"	Michael Giacchino; Scott Langteau	Bénabar	2:49
4.	"Nobody's Fool"	Paisley	Paisley	4:17
5.	"Polyrhythm"	Yasutaka Nakata	Perfume	4:09
6.	"Turbo Transmission"			0:52
7.	"It's Finn McMissile!"			5:54
8.	"Mater the Waiter"			0:43
9.	"Radiator Reunion"			1:40
10.	"Cranking Up the Heat"			1:59
11.	"Towkyo Takeout"			5:40
12.	"Tarmac the Magnificent"			3:27
13.	"Whose Engine Is This?"			1:22
14.	"History's Biggest Loser Cars"			2:26
15.	"Mater of Disguise"			0:48
16.	"Porto Corsa"			2:55
17.	"The Lemon Pledge"			2:13
18.	"Mater's Getaway"			0:59
19.	"Mater Warns McQueen"			1:31
20.	"Going to the Backup Plan"			2:24
21.	"Mater's the Bomb"			3:17
22.	"Blunder and Lightning"			2:17
23.	"The Other Shoot"			1:03
24.	"Axlerod Exposed"			2:22
25.	"The Radiator Springs Grand Prix"			1:30
26.	"The Turbomater"			0:50
Total length:				63:24

== Reception ==
James Southall of Movie Wave wrote "Nothing here is without merit – it's by a composer of serious talent and a knack of delivering what a film needs – but as an album, there's just something about it which means the whole seems rather less than the sum of its parts. It's reasonably entertaining, but I doubt anyone would consider it amongst the composer's finer efforts and it is left trailing in the dust of Newman's far superior music for the first instalment, which was never given the kind of release it deserved." Filmtracks.com wrote "the songs are fine and the score is merely average, Giacchino's music broader in scope and obviously longer in length than Newman's but lacking in any distinctive highlights or convincing emotional connection. It's simply parody music from start to finish, and it's tough to really become engaged with it when other composers have done it before and arguably done it better."

Bill Graham of Collider wrote "the score by Michael Giacchino lacks a focused, recognizable theme". James Christopher Monger of AllMusic wrote "The film's soundtrack reflects these changes, swapping out previous maestro Randy Newman with the extremely capable Michael Giacchino, and front-loading the collection with five very different pop songs." Todd McCarthy of The Hollywood Reporter wrote "Michael Giacchino's score has the effect of a supercharger on the film, as if it needed one".

== Chart performance ==
Chart (2011)	Peak position
Mexican Albums (AMPROFON)	25
US Billboard 200	150
US Soundtrack Albums (Billboard)	7

== Personnel ==
Credits adapted from CD liner notes.

- Creative direction – Steve Gerdes
- Music production assistant – Jimmy Tsai
- Music composer and producer – Michael Giacchino
- Music contractor – Reggie Wilson
- Music co-ordinator – Ashley Chafin
- Recording crew – Aaron Walk, Andre J.H. Zweers, Bruce Monical, Charlie Stavish, Dann Thompson, Drew Bollman, Ghian Wright, Kyle Manner, Neal Cappellino, Paul Smith, Steve Genewick
- Scoring crew – Jay Selvester, Richard Wheeler, Ryan Robinson
- Recording – Tom Hardisty, Dan Wallin
- Music production director – Andrew Page
- Additional music editor – Earl Ghaffari
- Assistant music editor – Alexandra Apostolakis
- Music editor – Stephen M. Davis
- Executive producer– Chris Montan
- Mastered by – Gavin Lurssen, Reuben Cohen
- Music consultant – Booker White, Walt Disney Music Library
- Musical assistance – Dave Martina
- Executive music assistance – Jill Heffley
- Orchestrations – Tim Simonec, Andrea Datzman, Brad Dechter, Cameron Patrick, Chris Tilton, Ira Hearshen, Mark Gasbarro, Marshall Bowen, Michael Giacchino, Peter Boyer
- Orchestra conductor – Tim Simonec
- Music business affairs – Donna Cole-Brulé
- Creative marketing – Glen Lajeski
- Mixing – Dan Wallin
- Music supervisor – Tom MacDougall
- Post-production supervisor – Paul Cichocki
