= Spike Jonze filmography =

American actor and filmmaker Spike Jonze (born October 22, 1969) has directed four feature films, 60-plus music videos, and numerous commercials, short films and skateboarding videos. He has also occasionally worked as an actor.

== Film ==
Year	Title	Director	Writer	Producer
1999	Being John Malkovich	Yes	No	No
2001	Human Nature	No	No	Yes
2002	Jackass: The Movie	No	Yes	Yes
2002	Adaptation	Yes	No	No
2006	Jackass Number Two	No	Yes	Yes
2007	Jackass 2.5	No	Yes	Yes
2008	Synecdoche, New York	No	No	Yes
2009	Where the Wild Things Are	Yes	Yes	No
2010	Jackass 3D	No	Yes	Yes
2011	Jackass 3.5	No	Yes	Yes
2013	Her	Yes	Yes	Yes
2013	Jackass Presents: Bad Grandpa	No	Yes	Yes
2014	Jackass Presents: Bad Grandpa .5	No	Yes	Yes
2022	Jackass Forever	Opening sequence	Yes	Yes
2022	Jackass 4.5	No	Yes	Yes
2026	Jackass: Best and Last	No	Yes	Yes

Executive producer

- Nine Days (2020)
- You Resemble Me (2021)
- Geoff McFetridge: Drawing a Life (2023)

=== Short film ===
Year	Title					
Year	Title	Director	Writer	Actor	Role	Notes
1994	Ciao, L.A.	Yes	No	No		
1996	Pig!	No	No	Yes		
1997	How They Get There	Yes	Yes	No		
1999	Torrance Rises	Yes	No	Yes	Richard Koufey	Co-directed with Lance Bangs
1999	An Intimate Look Inside the Acting Process with Ice Cube	Yes	No	No		
2004	The Mystery of Dalarö	Yes	No	No		Short commercial film
2009	We Were Once a Fairytale	Yes	Yes	No		
2010	I'm Here	Yes	Yes	No		
2010	The Vampire Attack	Yes	No	Yes	The Vampire	
2011	Scenes From the Suburbs	Yes	No	No		
2011	Mourir Auprès De Toi	Yes	Yes	Yes	Macbeth	
2013	Choose You	Yes	No	No		
2016	Kenzo World	Yes	Yes	No		Short commercial film for Kenzo
2018	Welcome Home	Yes	Yes	No		Short commercial film for Apple Inc.
2022	Rone X (La)horde: Ghosts	No	Yes	No		
2025	The Tiger	Yes	Yes	No		Short commercial film for Gucci; co-directed/co-written with Halina Reijn
2026	Bananas	Yes	No	No		Short commercial film for Instacart; 30-second version aired during Super Bowl LX

=== Documentary film ===
Year	Title				
Year	Title	Director	Producer	Himself	Notes
1998	Amarillo by Morning	Yes	No	No	Documentary short film
2002	What's Up, Fatlip?	Yes	No	Yes	Documentary short film
2007	Heavy Metal in Baghdad	No	Executive	No	
2008	Jackass Presents: Mat Hoffman's Tribute to Evel Knievel	No	Executive	Yes	Direct-to-video
2009	Tell Them Anything You Want: A Portrait of Maurice Sendak	Yes	No	No	
2010	The Lazarus Effect	No	Executive	No	Documentary short film
2017	Epicly Later'd	No	No	Yes	TV documentary
2017	Dumb: The Story of Big Brother Magazine	No	No	Yes	
2017	Jim & Andy: The Great Beyond	No	Yes	No	
2020	Beastie Boys Story	Yes	Yes	Yes	Also writer
2023	Geoff McFetridge: Drawing a Life	No	Executive	Yes	
2023	Michel Gondry, Do it Yourself !	No	No	Yes	

=== Acting roles ===
Year	Title		
Year	Title	Role	Notes
1994	Mi Vida Loca	Teenage Drug Customer	
1997	The Game	Airbag EMT Beltran	
1999	Three Kings	Private First Class Conrad Vig	
1999	Being John Malkovich	Derek Mantini's Assistant	
2001	Keep Your Eyes Open	Officer Jonze	
2002	Jackass: The Movie	Himself	
2002	Adaptation.	Himself	
2006	Jackass Number Two	Himself and Gloria	
2007	Jackass 2.5	Himself and Gloria	
2008	Jackass Presents: Mat Hoffman's Tribute to Evel Knievel	Himself	
2009	Jackass: The Lost Tapes	Himself	
2009	Where the Wild Things Are	Bob and Terry (voice)	
2010	Higglety Pigglety Pop! or There Must Be More to Life	Plant (voice)	
2010	Jackass 3D	Himself and Kathy	
2011	Jackass 3.5	Himself and Kathy	
2011	Moneyball	Alán	Uncredited
2013	Her	Alien Child (voice)	
2013	Jackass Presents: Bad Grandpa	Gloria	
2013	The Wolf of Wall Street	Dwayne	Uncredited
2014	Jackass Presents: Bad Grandpa .5	Gloria	
2016	The Jungle Book	Pangolin	Uncredited
2021	Sing 2	Jerry (voice)	Uncredited
2022	Jackass Forever	Himself	
2022	Jackass 4.5	Himself	
2022	Babylon	Otto von Strassberger	Uncredited
2024	Dìdi	Dead Squirrel (voice)	
2026	Jackass: Best and Last	Himself	

=== Cinematographer ===
Year	Title	
Year	Title	Notes
1996	Bed, Bath and Beyond	Short film
1997	Free Tibet	Documentary film
2006	Tell Me What Rockers to Swallow	Concert film

== Television ==
Year	Title	Director	Executive Producer	Actor	Role	Notes
1995	Double Rush	Yes	No	No		Opening titles only
2000–2001	Jackass	No	Yes	Yes	Himself	4 episodes; also creator
2007–2012	Spike Spends Saturday With...	No	Yes	Yes	Himself	Documentary series
2010–2012	The Increasingly Poor Decisions of Todd Margaret	No	No	Yes	Doug Whitney	8 episodes
2011	A Tribute to Ryan Dunn	No	Yes	Yes	Himself	TV documentary
2015	Girls	No	No	Yes	Marcos	Episode: "Home Birth"
2016	The Late Show with Stephen Colbert	Yes	No	No		Episode: "February 29, 2016"
2016–present	Viceland programs	No	Yes	No		Creative director
2017	Epicly Later'd: Bam Margera	Yes	Yes	Yes	Himself	TV documentary
2019	Aziz Ansari: Right Now	Yes	Yes	No		Stand-up comedy special
2026	Let It Kill You: Jeff Tremaine	No	No	Yes	Himself	TV documentary

== Music videos ==
Year	Song	Artist	Notes
1992	"Hush"	Wax	
1992	"High in High School"	Chainsaw Kittens	
1992	"100%"	Sonic Youth	Co-directed with Tamra Davis
1993	"Cannonball"	The Breeders	Co-directed with Kim Gordon
1993	"Country at War"	X	
1993	"Daughters of the Kaos"	Luscious Jackson	
1993	"Hang On"	Teenage Fanclub	
1993	"Time for Livin'"	Beastie Boys	
1994	"All About Eve"	Marxman	
1994	"Buddy Holly"	Weezer	
1994	"Ditch Digger"	Rocket from the Crypt	
1994	"Divine Hammer"	The Breeders	Co-directed with Kim Gordon & Richard Kern
1994	"Feel the Pain"	Dinosaur Jr.	
1994	"I Can't Stop Smiling"	Velocity Girl	
1994	"If I Only Had a Brain"	MC 900 Ft. Jesus	
1994	"Old Timer"	that dog.	
1994	"Ricky's Theme"	Beastie Boys	
1994	"Sabotage"	Beastie Boys	Also writer
1994	"Sure Shot"	Beastie Boys	
1994	"Undone - The Sweater Song"	Weezer	
1995	"California"	Wax	
1995	"Car Song"	Elastica	
1995	"Crush with Eyeliner"	R.E.M.	
1995	"Freedom of '76"	Ween	
1995	"It's Oh So Quiet"	Björk	
1995	"Big Train"	Mike Watt	
1995	"The Diamond Sea"	Sonic Youth	
1995	"Who Is Next?"	Wax	
1996	"Drop"	The Pharcyde	
1997	"Da Funk"	Daft Punk	
1997	"Electrolite"	R.E.M.	
1997	"Elektrobank"	The Chemical Brothers	
1997	"It's All About the Benjamins" (Rock Remix)	Puff Daddy	
1997	"Liberty Calls"	Mike Watt	
1997	"Shady Lane"	Pavement	
1997	"Sky's the Limit"	The Notorious B.I.G.	
1998	"Home"	Sean Lennon	
1998	"Root Down" (Version 2)	Beastie Boys	
1999	"Praise You"	Fatboy Slim	Also as lead dancer, Richard Koufey, and co-directed with Roman Coppola
2000	"What's Up, Fatlip?"	Fatlip	
2000	"Wonderboy"	Tenacious D	As Marcus Von Bueler
2001	"Weapon of Choice"	Fatboy Slim	
2001	"Island in the Sun" (Version 2)	Weezer	
2002	"Guess I'm Doing Fine"	Beck	
2002	"It's in Our Hands"	Björk	
2003	"Sell Your Body (to the Night)"	Turbonegro	Co-directed with Jeff Tremaine
2003	"Big Brat"	Phantom Planet	
2004	"Get Back"	Ludacris	
2004	"Y Control"	Yeah Yeah Yeahs	
2005	"Triumph of a Heart"	Björk	
2008	"Flashing Lights"	Kanye West	Co-directed with Kanye West
2009	"Heaven"	UNKLE	Co-directed with Ty Evans
2009	"25"	AsDSSka	Co-directed with Crystal Moselle
2010	"Drunk Girls"	LCD Soundsystem	Co-directed with James Murphy
2010	"The Suburbs"	Arcade Fire	Edited from the short film Scenes from the Suburbs
2011	"Don't Play No Game That I Can't Win"	Beastie Boys featuring Santigold	
2011	"Otis"	Jay-Z & Kanye West	
2013	"Afterlife"	Arcade Fire	Directed live for the YouTube Music Awards
2013	"Dope"	Lady Gaga	Directed live for the YouTube Music Awards
2015	"Only One"	Kanye West featuring Paul McCartney	
2018	"I Love It"	Kanye West & Lil Pump featuring Adele Givens	Executive producer; directed by Kanye West and Amanda Adelson
2019	"Woman"	Karen O & Danger Mouse	Directed live for The Late Show with Stephen Colbert
2024	"All My Love"	Coldplay	Co-directed with Mary Wigmore

== Commercials ==
Year	Title	Subject	Notes
1995	"Guerrilla Tennis"	Nike	
1996	"Epic Point"	Nike	
1996	—N/a	Snapple	
1996	"Doctors"	Levi's	
1997	"Bones"	Wrangler	
1997	"Lucky"	Wrangler	
1997	"Tank"	Wrangler	
1997	"Bodacious"	Wrangler	
1997	"Fight"	Wrangler	
1997	"Skip"	Wrangler	
1997	"Chair"	Nissan	
1998	"Sun Fizz"	Sprite	
1998	"Car"	Lee	
1998	"Twister"	Lee	
1998	"Parachute"	Lee	
1999	"Morning After"	Nike	
2002	"Crazy Legs"	Levi's	
2002	"Lamp"	IKEA	
2004	"The Mystery of Dalarö"	Volvo	Also a short film
2005	"Hello Tomorrow"	Adidas	
2005	"Pardon Our Dust"	GAP	
2006	"Auditions"	Miller	
2009	"Sumo"	SoftBank	
2010	"Twizzler"	Lakai	
2016	"Kenzo World"	Kenzo	Also a short film
2018	"Welcome Home"	Apple	Also a short film
2019	"The New Normal"	MedMen	
2019	"Dream It"	Squarespace	
2025	"Someday"	Apple	
2025	"The Tiger"	Gucci	Also a short film; co-directed with Halina Reijn
2026	"For Papa!"	Instacart	Aired during Super Bowl LX; starring Ben Stiller and Benson Boone

== Skateboarding videos ==
Year	Title	Director	Executive producer	Notes
1989	Rubbish Heap	Yes	No	
1991	Video Days	Yes	No	Also producer
1993	Goldfish	Yes	No	
1995	Las Nueve Vidas De Paco	Yes	Yes	
1996	Mouse	Yes	Yes	Co-directed with Rick Howard
1999	The Chocolate Tour	Yes	Yes	Co-directed with Rick Howard
2002	Harsh Euro Barge	No	Yes	
2002	Beware of the Flare	No	Yes	
2003	Yeah Right!	Yes	Yes	Co-directed with Ty Evans
2004	Hot Chocolate	Yes	Yes	Co-directed with Ty Evans & Cory Weincheque
2005	Super Champion Funzone	Yes	Yes	Co-directed with Ty Evans & Cory Weincheque
2006	Krooked Kronichles	Yes	No	
2007	Fully Flared	Yes	Yes	Co-directed with Ty Evans & Cory Weincheque
2008	The Final Flare!	Yes	Yes	Co-directed with Ty Evans, Cory Weincheque & Aaron Meza
2011	Unbeleafable	No	Yes	
2012	Pretty Sweet	Yes	Yes	Co-directed with Ty Evans & Cory Weincheque
2014	Wet Dream: a skateboard tale	No	Yes	
2017	The Flare	No	No	Producer
2018	Doll	No	Yes	

== Theater ==
Year	Title	Director	Writer
2017	Changers: A Dance Story	Yes	Yes
2019	Beastie Boys Story: As Told By Mike D & Ad-Rock	Yes	No

== Podcast ==
Year	Title	Role	Note
2017	Homecoming	Randolph Geist	2 episodes
