= List of awards and nominations received by Spike Jonze =

Spike Jonze awards and nominations
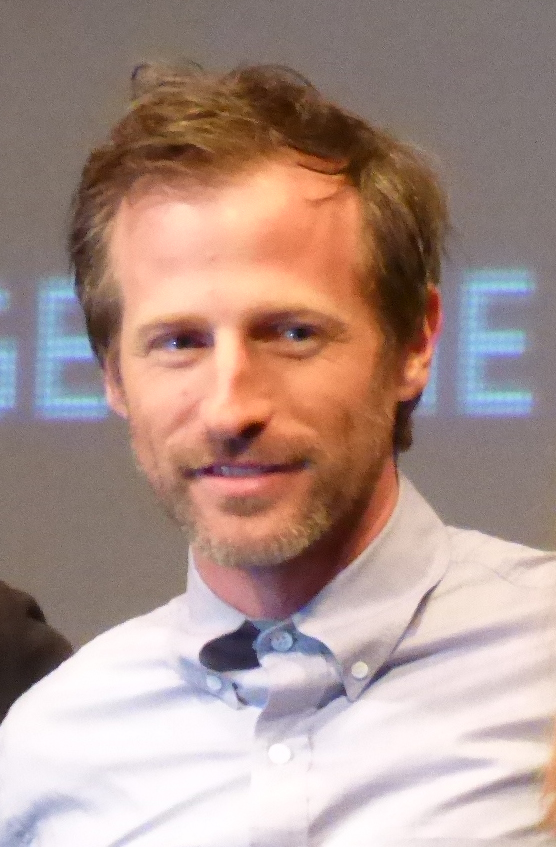
- Jonze at the 2013 New York Film Festival
Awards and nominations
Award	Wins	Nominations
Academy Awards	1	4
Directors Guild of America Awards	2	6
Emmy Awards	0	5
Golden Globe Awards	1	3
Grammy Awards	1	4
Writers Guild of America Awards	1	1

Totals (Note: Certain award groups do not simply award one winner. They acknowledge several different recipients, have runners-up, and have third place. Since this is a specific recognition and is different from losing an award, runner-up mentions are considered wins in this award tally. For simplification and to avoid errors, each award in this list has been presumed to have had a prior nomination.)
- Wins: 48
- Nominations: 108

Spike Jonze is an American director, screenwriter, producer and actor who has received various awards and nominations, including an Academy Award, two Directors Guild of America Awards, a Golden Globe Award, a Grammy Award, and a Writers Guild of America Award.

Jonze began his feature film directing career with the fantasy comedy film Being John Malkovich (1999), which was met with critical acclaim and earned him nominations for the Academy Award for Best Director and the Directors Guild of America Award for Outstanding Directing for Feature Films. For the comedy-drama metafilm Adaptation. (2002), he was nominated for the Golden Globe Award for Best Director and won the Silver Bear Grand Jury Prize at the Berlin International Film Festival. In 2013, the sci-fi romantic comedy film Her was released, which earned him numerous accolades for his writing, including the Golden Globe Award, the Writers Guild of America Award and the Academy Award for Best Original Screenplay. Jonze was also nominated for Best Picture and Best Original Song at the 86th Academy Awards.

Jonze has directed several music videos, winning the Grammy Award for Fatboy Slim's "Weapon of Choice" (2001), and various commercials for companies like Apple, Adidas or Gap, receiving two Directors Guild of America Awards for Outstanding Directing for Commercials. For his television work, he was nominated for five Primetime Emmy Awards, thanks to his production and writing credits on documentary series like Gaycation (2016–17), Jim & Andy: The Great Beyond (2017) and Beastie Boys Story (2020).

== Awards and nominations ==
Awards and nominations received by Spike Jonze
Award	Year	Work	Category	Result	Ref.
Academy Awards	2000	Being John Malkovich	Best Director	Nominated	
Academy Awards	2014	Her	Best Picture (Note: shared with Megan Ellison and Vincent Landay.)	Nominated	
Academy Awards	2014	Her	Best Original Screenplay	Won	
Academy Awards	2014	"The Moon Song"	Best Original Song (Note: shared with Karen O.)	Nominated	
Alliance of Women Film Journalists Awards	2013	Her	Best Picture	Nominated	
Alliance of Women Film Journalists Awards	2013	Her	Best Director	Nominated	
Alliance of Women Film Journalists Awards	2013	Her	Best Original Screenplay	Won	
Austin Film Critics Association Awards	2013	Her	Best Film	Won	
Austin Film Critics Association Awards	2013	Her	Best Original Screenplay	Won	
Berlin International Film Festival Awards	2003	Adaptation.	Golden Bear	Nominated	
Berlin International Film Festival Awards	2003	Adaptation.	Silver Bear Grand Jury Prize	Won	
Berlin International Film Festival Awards	2011	Scenes from the Suburbs	Short Film Golden Bear	Nominated	
Bodil Awards	2001	Being John Malkovich	Best American Film	Nominated	
Bodil Awards	2015	Her	Best American Film	Nominated	
Boston Society of Film Critics Awards	1999	Being John Malkovich	Best New Filmmaker	Nominated	
César Awards	2000	Being John Malkovich	Best Foreign Film	Nominated	
Chicago Film Critics Association Awards	2009	Where the Wild Things Are	Best Director	Nominated	
Chicago Film Critics Association Awards	2009	Where the Wild Things Are	Best Adapted Screenplay (Note: shared with Dave Eggers.)	Nominated	
Chicago Film Critics Association Awards	2013	Her	Best Film	Nominated	
Chicago Film Critics Association Awards	2013	Her	Best Director	Nominated	
Chicago Film Critics Association Awards	2013	Her	Best Original Screenplay	Won	
Chlotrudis Awards	2000	Being John Malkovich	Best Director	Won	
Critics' Choice Movie Awards	2000	Being John Malkovich; Three Kings	Breakthrough Performer	Won	
Critics' Choice Movie Awards	2014	Her	Best Picture	Nominated	
Critics' Choice Movie Awards	2014	Her	Best Director	Nominated	
Critics' Choice Movie Awards	2014	Her	Best Screenplay	Won	
Dallas–Fort Worth Film Critics Association Awards	2013	Her	Best Screenplay (Note: Tied with Bob Nelson for Nebraska.)	Runner-up	
Deauville American Film Festival Awards	1999	Being John Malkovich	Grand Prix	Won	
Deauville American Film Festival Awards	1999	Being John Malkovich	Prix de la Critique Internationale	Won	
Detroit Film Critics Society Awards	2013	Her	Best Film	Won	
Detroit Film Critics Society Awards	2013	Her	Best Director	Nominated	
Detroit Film Critics Society Awards	2013	Her	Best Screenplay	Won	
Directors Guild of America Awards	2000	Being John Malkovich	Outstanding Directing – Feature Film	Nominated	
Directors Guild of America Awards	2006	Adidas' "Hello Tomorrow"; Miller's "Penguin"; Gap's "Pardon Our Dust"	Outstanding Directing – Commercials	Nominated	
Directors Guild of America Awards	2019	Apple's "Welcome Home"	Outstanding Directing – Commercials	Won	
Directors Guild of America Awards	2020	Squarespace's "Dream It"; MedMen's "The New Normal"	Outstanding Directing – Commercials	Won	
Directors Guild of America Awards	2020	Aziz Ansari: Right Now	Outstanding Directing – Variety Specials	Nominated	
Directors Guild of America Awards	2026	Apple's "Someday"	Outstanding Directing – Commercials	Nominated	
Florida Film Critics Circle Awards	2000	Being John Malkovich; Three Kings	Pauline Kael Breakout Award	Won	
Florida Film Critics Circle Awards	2013	Her	Best Original Screenplay	Won	
Georgia Film Critics Association Awards	2013	Her	Best Picture	Won	
Georgia Film Critics Association Awards	2013	Her	Best Original Screenplay	Won	
Golden Globe Awards	2003	Adaptation.	Best Director	Nominated	
Golden Globe Awards	2014	Her	Best Motion Picture – Musical or Comedy	Nominated	
Golden Globe Awards	2014	Her	Best Screenplay	Won	
Gotham Awards	2008	Synecdoche, New York	Best Feature (Note: shared with Charlie Kaufman, Sidney Kimmel and Anthony Bregman.)	Nominated	
Grammy Awards	1996	"It's Oh So Quiet"	Best Music Video	Nominated	
Grammy Awards	2002	"Weapon of Choice"	Best Music Video	Won	
Grammy Awards	2015	"The Moon Song"	Best Song Written for Visual Media	Nominated	
Grammy Awards	2021	Beastie Boys Story	Best Music Film	Nominated	
Houston Film Critics Society Awards	2013	Her	Best Screenplay	Nominated	
Hugo Awards	2000	Being John Malkovich	Best Dramatic Presentation (Note: shared with Charlie Kaufman.)	Nominated	
London Film Critics' Circle Awards	2001	Being John Malkovich	Director of the Year	Won	
London Film Critics' Circle Awards	2014	Her	Film of the Year	Nominated	
London Film Critics' Circle Awards	2014	Her	Screenwriter of the Year	Nominated	
Los Angeles Film Critics Association Awards	2013	Her	Best Film (Note: Tied with Gravity.)	Won	
Los Angeles Film Critics Association Awards	2013	Her	Best Director	Runner-up	
Los Angeles Film Critics Association Awards	2013	Her	Best Screenplay	Runner-up	
MTV Movie & TV Awards	2000	Being John Malkovich	Best New Filmmaker	Won	
MTV Video Music Awards	1994	"Sabotage"	Best Direction	Nominated	
MTV Video Music Awards	1995	"Buddy Holly"	Best Direction	Won	
MTV Video Music Awards	1996	"It's Oh So Quiet"	Best Direction	Nominated	
MTV Video Music Awards	1999	"Praise You"	Best Direction	Won	
MTV Video Music Awards	1999	"Praise You"	Best Choreography	Won	
MTV Video Music Awards	2001	"Weapon of Choice"	Best Choreography	Won	
MTV Video Music Awards	2001	"Weapon of Choice"	Best Direction	Won	
MTV Video Music Awards	2012	"Otis"	Best Direction	Nominated	
Nastro d'Argento Awards	2000	Being John Malkovich	Best Director of a Foreign Film	Nominated	
National Board of Review Awards	2013	Her	Best Film	Won	
National Board of Review Awards	2013	Her	Best Director	Won	
Nebula Awards	2014	Her	Ray Bradbury Award	Nominated	
New York Film Critics Circle Awards	2000	Being John Malkovich	Best First Film	Won	
New York Film Critics Circle Awards	2014	Her	Best Screenplay	Nominated	
New York Film Critics Online Awards	2013	Her	Best Screenplay	Won	
Online Film Critics Society Awards	2000	Being John Malkovich	Best Director	Nominated	
Online Film Critics Society Awards	2000	Being John Malkovich	Best Debut	Won	
Online Film Critics Society Awards	2003	Adaptation.	Best Director	Nominated	
Online Film Critics Society Awards	2010	Where the Wild Things Are	Best Adapted Screenplay	Nominated	
Online Film Critics Society Awards	2013	Her	Best Picture	Nominated	
Online Film Critics Society Awards	2013	Her	Best Director	Nominated	
Online Film Critics Society Awards	2013	Her	Best Original Screenplay	Won	
Primetime Emmy Awards	2016	Gaycation with Ellen Page	Outstanding Unstructured Reality Program (Note: Shared with the executive producers of Gaycation with Ellen Page.)	Nominated	
Primetime Emmy Awards	2017	Gaycation with Ellen Page	Outstanding Unstructured Reality Program	Nominated	
Primetime Emmy Awards	2018	Jim & Andy: The Great Beyond	Outstanding Documentary or Nonfiction Special (Note: Shared with the producers and the executive producers of Jim & Andy: The Great Beyond.)	Nominated	
Primetime Emmy Awards	2020	Beastie Boys Story	Outstanding Documentary or Nonfiction Special (Note: Shared with the producers and the executive producers of Beastie Boys Story.)	Nominated	
Primetime Emmy Awards	2020	Beastie Boys Story	Outstanding Writing for a Nonfiction Programming (Note: Shared with Mike D and Ad-Rock.)	Nominated	
Producers Guild of America Awards	2014	Her	Best Theatrical Motion Picture	Nominated	
San Diego Film Critics Society Awards	2013	Her	Best Film	Won	
San Diego Film Critics Society Awards	2013	Her	Best Director	Nominated	
San Diego Film Critics Society Awards	2013	Her	Best Original Screenplay	Won	
San Francisco Film Critics Circle Awards	2013	Her	Best Director	Nominated	
San Francisco Film Critics Circle Awards	2013	Her	Best Original Screenplay	Nominated	
Satellite Awards	2014	Her	Best Original Screenplay	Nominated	
Saturn Awards	2010	Where the Wild Things Are	Best Writing	Nominated	
Saturn Awards	2014	Her	Best Fantasy Film	Won	
Saturn Awards	2014	Her	Best Writing	Won	
St. Louis Film Critics Association Awards	2013	Her	Best Film	Nominated	
St. Louis Film Critics Association Awards	2013	Her	Best Director	Nominated	
St. Louis Film Critics Association Awards	2013	Her	Best Original Screenplay	Won	
Toronto Film Critics Association Awards	2013	Her	Best Screenplay	Won	
Vancouver Film Critics Circle Awards	2014	Her	Best Screenplay	Nominated	
Venice Film Festival Awards	1999	Being John Malkovich	FIPRESCI Prize	Won	
Washington D.C. Area Film Critics Association Awards	2013	Her	Best Film	Nominated	
Washington D.C. Area Film Critics Association Awards	2013	Her	Best Director	Nominated	
Washington D.C. Area Film Critics Association Awards	2013	Her	Best Original Screenplay	Won	
World Soundtrack Awards	2014	"The Moon Song"	Best Original Song Written Directly for a Film	Nominated	
Writers Guild of America Awards	2014	Her	Best Original Screenplay	Won	
