= 11th Golden Laurel Awards =

11th Annual Golden Laurel Awards
- Date: March 2, 2000
- Location: The Century Plaza Hotel, Los Angeles, California
- Country: United States
- Presented by: Producers Guild of America

Highlights
- Best Producer(s) Motion Picture: American Beauty – Bruce Cohen and Dan Jinks

The 11th Golden Laurel Awards (also known as 2000 Golden Laurel Awards), honoring the best film and television producers of 1999, were held at The Century Plaza Hotel in Los Angeles, California on March 2, 2000. The nominees were announced on January 19, 2000.

== Winners and nominees ==
=== Film ===
Darryl F. Zanuck Award for Outstanding Producer of Theatrical Motion Pictures
- American Beauty – Bruce Cohen and Dan Jinks
  - Being John Malkovich – Michael Stipe, Sandy Stern, Steve Golin, and Vincent Landay
  - The Cider House Rules – Richard N. Gladstein
  - The Hurricane – Norman Jewison, Armyan Bernstein, and John Ketcham
  - The Insider – Michael Mann and Pieter Jan Brugge

=== Television ===
Norman Felton Award for Outstanding Producer of Episodic Television
- The Sopranos
  - Judging Amy
  - Law & Order: Special Victims Unit
  - Sports Night
  - The West Wing
Norman Felton Award for Outstanding Producer of Non-Episodic Television
- Tuesdays with Morrie
  - The Century: America's Time
  - Dash and Lilly
  - The Passion of Ayn Rand
  - Pirates of Silicon Valley

=== David O. Selznick Lifetime Achievement Award in Theatrical Motion Pictures ===
- Jerry Bruckheimer

=== David Susskind Lifetime Achievement Award in Television ===
- Aaron Spelling

=== Milestone Award ===
- Sherry Lansing

=== Nova Award for Most Promising Producer ===
- Theatrical Motion Pictures: Robin Cowie and Gregg Hale for The Blair Witch Project
- Television: Aaron Sorkin for Sports Night and The West Wing

=== PGA Hall of Fame ===
- Theatrical Motion Pictures: Robert Evans for Chinatown, Kathleen Kennedy and Steven Spielberg for E.T. the Extra-Terrestrial, and Billy Wilder for Some Like It Hot
- Television: Marcy Carsey and Tom Werner for The Cosby Show, Jack Webb for Dragnet, and Quinn Martin and Alan Armer for The Fugitive

=== Vision Award ===
- Theatrical Motion Pictures: Michael Stipe, Sandy Stern, Steve Golin, and Vincent Landay for Being John Malkovich
- Television: John Wells for ER, Third Watch and The West Wing
