= Eric Zumbrunnen =

American film editor

- Born: November 4, 1964
- Died: August 1, 2017 (aged 52); Pacific Palisades, Los Angeles
- Known for: Collaboration with Spike Jonze
- Spouse: Suzanne Marie Berry

Eric James Zumbrunnen (November 4, 1964 – August 1, 2017) was a film editor who won the ACE Eddie Award for the film Being John Malkovich (1999).

== Biography ==
Zumbrunnen graduated from the University of Southern California with a degree in journalism. From 1985 to 1987, Zumbrunnen was lead singer and guitarist in the Los Angeles proto-alt band, Holmes, alongside fellow singer and guitarist, Bart Lipton, keyboardist Kelly Bass, Bass player Robin Paulson and Drummer Paul Perme. Often referred to as "the 83rd hottest band in L.A.", Holmes was known mostly for its bizarre mashup hybrid tracks "Wagon Train to Hell" and "Ironsides".

Zumbrunnen was a member in the American Cinema Editors.

Zumbrunnen died from cancer on August 1, 2017.

== Collaboration with Spike Jonze ==
Zumbrunnen had a notable collaboration with the director Spike Jonze. He edited Jonze's early short films How They Get There (1997) and Amarillo by Morning (1998). He also edited a lot of Jonze’s music videos during this time, including the video for Weezer’s Buddy Holly . Jonze directed Being John Malkovich; in addition to winning the ACE Eddie for Zumbrunnen, that film was also nominated for the BAFTA Award for Best Editing. Their next collaboration, Adaptation. (2002), was nominated both for an ACE Eddie Award and for a Satellite Award for Best Editing. For their last collaboration, Zumbrunnen, paired with editor Jeff Buchanan, was again nominated for the Eddie for Jonze's Her (2013).

== Filmography ==
Film	Year	Notes
Gift	1993	Experimental docudrama film; made by Perry Farrell and Casey Niccoli
Buddy Holly	1994	Weezer music video; directed by Spike Jonze. Featured on the 2004 compilation DVD Weezer – Video Capture Device: Treasures from the Vault 1991–2002.
Zombie	1994	The Cranberries music video; directed by Samuel Bayer
Tonight, Tonight	1996	The Smashing Pumpkins music video; directed by Jonathan Dayton and Valerie Faris
How They Get There	1997	Short film; directed by Spike Jonze
Amarillo by Morning	1998	Short documentary film; directed by Spike Jonze
Lick the Star	1998	Short film; directed by Sofia Coppola
Being John Malkovich	1999	Feature film; directed by Spike Jonze
Adaptation.	2002	Feature film; directed by Spike Jonze
Where the Wild Things Are	2009	(with James Haygood) Feature film; directed by Spike Jonze
I'm Here	2010	(with Stephen Berger) Feature film; directed by Spike Jonze
John Carter	2012	Feature film; directed by Andrew Stanton
Her	2013	(with Jeff Buchanan) Feature film; directed by Spike Jonze

== See also ==
- List of film director and editor collaborations
