= Amarillo by Morning =

Amarillo by Morning may refer to:

- "Amarillo by Morning" (song), a song by Paul Fraser & Terry Stafford, covered by numerous artists, including George Strait and Asleep at the Wheel
- Amarillo by Morning (film), a documentary film by Spike Jonze
