= Lance Acord =

American cinematographer (born 1964)

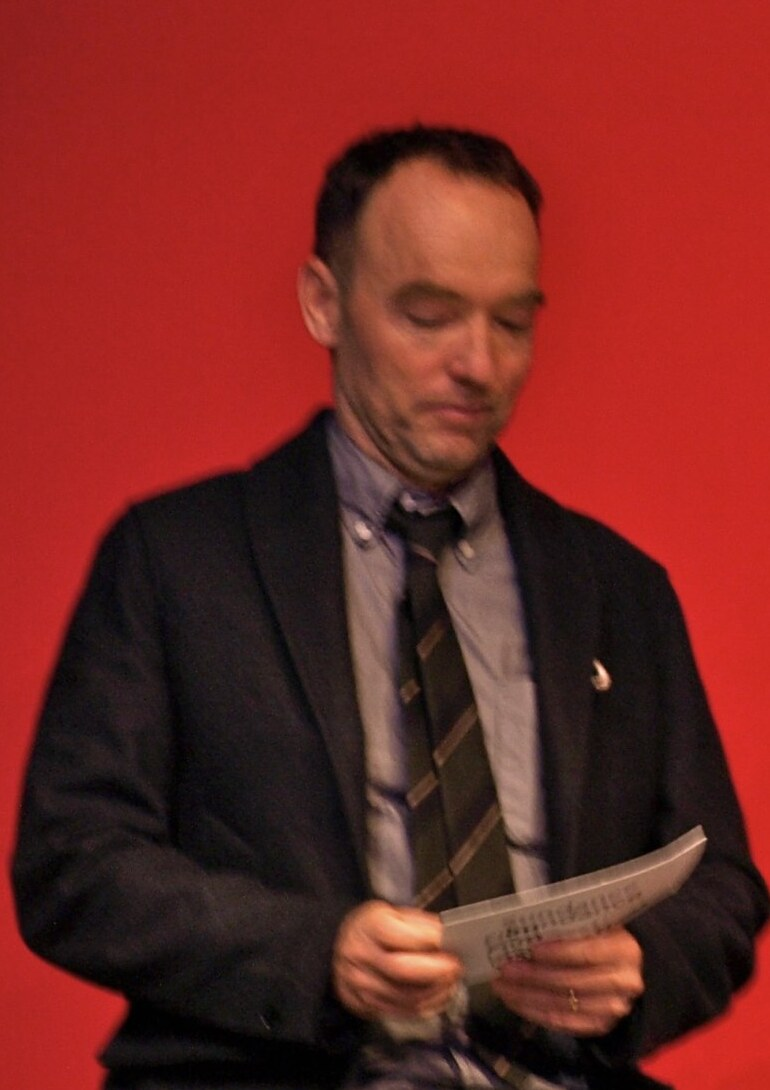
- Acord at Sundance 2015
- Occupations: Cinematographer, Film director
- Years active: 1988–present

Lance Acord ASC is an American cinematographer and film director.

== Early life ==
Acord studied photography and filmmaking at the San Francisco Art Institute.

== Career ==
=== Cinematographer ===
Acord began his career with photographer/filmmaker Bruce Weber, which whom he made documentaries, commercials and music videos. His breakthrough came after he shot the music video for Björk's "Big Time Sensuality", directed by Stéphane Sednaoui. Acord continued to work extensively in commercials and music videos through the 1990s. He earned the MTV Video Music Award for Best Cinematography for his work on the Fatboy Slim music video for "Weapon of Choice", which featured Christopher Walken and was directed by Spike Jonze. He also worked with R.E.M. on a regular basis.

Acord made his first foray into narrative feature filmmaking as the cinematographer of Vincent Gallo's Buffalo '66 (1998). He shot Spike Jonze's films Being John Malkovich (1999), Adaptation (2002), and Where the Wild Things Are (2009), Sofia Coppola's Lost in Translation (2003), Marie Antoinette (2006), and her short film Lick the Star (1998), as well as Peter Care's The Dangerous Lives of Altar Boys (2002).

=== Commercial director ===
In the late 1990s, Acord began to transition to commercial directing and in 1998, together with his business partner Jackie Kelman Bisbee, he founded the commercial production company Park Pictures. He received 35 Cannes Lions for his work with clients such as Nike, Apple, HP, Volkswagen, P&G, Subaru. He was nominated for Best Commercial Director by the DGA in 2003, 2011, 2012, and 2017. In 2011, his Super Bowl spot for Volkswagen, "The Force", was named the best ad of 2011 by AdWeek, Creativity, and YouTube and consistently ranks on lists of the greatest Super Bowl commercials of all time. His Apple film "Misunderstood" won the 2014 Emmy Award for Outstanding Commercial. In 2019, he won his second Emmy award for the Nike commercial "Dream Crazy," starring Colin Kaepernick.

In 2019, directed the short film commercial for Xfinity, A Holiday Reunion, based on the film E.T. the Extra-Terrestrial and starring Henry Thomas, who reprises his role as Elliott.

== Filmography ==
=== Director of photography ===
Short film

Year	Title	Director	Notes
1992	Billy Nayer	Cory McAbee	
1995	Gentle Giants	Bruce Weber	
1997	How They Get There	Spike Jonze	
1998	Amarillo by Morning	Spike Jonze	Documentary short
1998	Lick the Star	Sofia Coppola	
2000	Eventual Wife	Bryan Bantry; Dave Diamond	
2012	Ed Ruscha, Woody and the World's Hottest Pepper	Himself	
2013	Apple Misunderstood	Himself	
2019	E.T.: A Holiday Reunion	Himself	TV special

Feature film

Year	Title	Director
1998	Buffalo '66	Vincent Gallo
1999	Being John Malkovich	Spike Jonze
2001	Southlander	Steve Hanft
2002	The Dangerous Lives of Altar Boys	Peter Care
2002	Adaptation	Spike Jonze
2003	Lost in Translation	Sofia Coppola
2006	Marie Antoinette	Sofia Coppola
2009	Where the Wild Things Are	Spike Jonze
2014	God's Pocket	John Slattery

Documentary film

Year	Title	Director	Notes
1998	Free Tibet	Sarah Pirozek	
2001	Chop Suey	Bruce Weber	With James D. Cooper and Jim Fealy
2012	Wild in the Streets	Peter Baxter	With Peter Baxter, Terrence Hayes, Laurent Malaquais and Mark Williams
2018	Nice Girls Don't Stay for Breakfast	Bruce Weber	

Music videos

Year	Artist	Title	Director	Notes
1993	The Smashing Pumpkins	"Cherub Rock"	Kevin Kerslake	
1993	Björk	"Big Time Sensuality"	Stéphane Sednaoui	
1994	Youssou N'Dour and Neneh Cherry	"7 Seconds"	Stéphane Sednaoui	
1994	MC Solaar	"Nouveau Western"	Stéphane Sednaoui	
1994	G. Love & Special Sauce	"Cold Beverage"	Mark Romanek	
1994	Sonic Youth	"Superstar"	Dave Markey	
1995	R.E.M.	"Crush with Eyeliner"	Spike Jonze	
1995	Ween	"Freedom of '76"	Spike Jonze	
1995	Waterlillies	"Never Get Enough"	Christina Wayne	
1995	Method Man featuring Mary J. Blige	"I'll Be There for You/You're All I Need to Get By"	Diane Martel	
1995	Method Man & Redman	"How High"	Diane Martel	
1995	Björk	"It's Oh So Quiet"	Spike Jonze	
1995	Elastica	"Car Song"	Spike Jonze	
1997	Daft Punk	"Da Funk"	Spike Jonze	
1997	Pond	"Spokes"	Mike Mills	
1997	The Chemical Brothers	"Elektrobank"	Spike Jonze	
1997	Björk	"Bachelorette"	Michel Gondry	
1997	The Notorious B.I.G.	"Sky's the Limit"	Spike Jonze	
1998	R.E.M.	"Lotus"	Stéphane Sednaoui	
1998	Fatboy Slim	"Praise You"	Spike Jonze	With Lance Bangs
1999	The Chemical Brothers	"Let Forever Be"	Michel Gondry	
1999	Tricky	"For Real"	Stéphane Sednaoui	
2001	Fatboy Slim	"Weapon of Choice"	Spike Jonze	
2001	Dave Matthews Band	"Everyday"	Chuck McBride	
2003	The White Stripes	"I Just Don't Know What to Do with Myself"	Sofia Coppola	
2004	Yeah Yeah Yeahs	"Y Control"	Spike Jonze	
2005	Björk	"Triumph of a Heart"	Spike Jonze	

=== Producer ===
- Robot & Frank (2012)
- God's Pocket (2014)

Executive producer

- The New Tenants (2009) (Short film)
- Cop Car (2015)
- Other People (2016)
- The Rehearsal (2016)
- The Hero (2017)
- An Evening with Beverly Luff Linn (2018)
- The Sentence (2018)
- Hearts Beat Loud (2018)
- Lazy Susan (2019) (Short film)
- Farewell Amor (2020)
- The Last Shift (2020)
- The Truffle Hunters (2020) (Documentary)
- The Heart Still Hums (2020) (Documentary short)
- Born to Play (2020) (Documentary)
- Another Hayride (2021) (Documentary short)
- Long Weekend (2021)
- There There (2022)
- Aisha (2022)
- Broadway Rising (2022) (Documentary)
- The Independent (2022)
- Earth Mama (2023)
- Late Bloomers (2023)
- Flipside (2023)
