= Adidas 1 =

Running shoe

Adidas_1
- Type: Sneakers
- Inventor: Adidas
- Inception: 2005
- Manufacturer: Adidas
- Available: Discontinued

The Adidas 1 was a running shoe made by German multinational corporation Adidas, introduced in early 2005. It was the second general consumer sneaker to incorporate a computer, after the Adidas 'Micropacer' in 1984. The shoe was later discontinued and later followed by the Adidas_1 basketball shoe, introduced in 2006.

== Overview ==
Requiring three years of development prior to release, the shoe adjusted itself after four strikes stride, using a motor in the middle of the sole. The motor turned a screw, which in turn lengthened or shortens a cable, changing the compression characteristics of the heel pad.

The shoe retailed for $250 in the U.S. at launch. The changes were guided by a sensor in the heel, which determined how much the heel was compressed on each stride. The shoe was battery-powered, and lasted for approximately 100 hours of running.

On 25 November 2005, Adidas released a new version of the Adidas 1. There was an increased range of cushioning and a new motor with 153% more torque in the IL 1.1 upgrade.

== See also ==
- Hello Tomorrow, television commercial for this shoe
