= 2013 New York Film Festival =

51st edition

- Opening film: Captain Phillips
- Closing film: Her
- Location: New York City, United States
- Founded: 1963
- Founded by: Richard Roud and Amos Vogel
- Hosted by: Film at Lincoln Center
- Artistic director: Kent Jones
- Festival date: September 27 – October 13, 2013
- Website: https://www.filmlinc.org/nyff/

New York Film Festival
- 2014 2012

The 51st New York Film Festival took place from September 27 to October 13, 2013, in New York City, presented by Film at Lincoln Center.

The festival's opening film was Paul Greengrass' Captain Phillips. Ben Stiller's The Secret Life of Walter Mitty was the festival's centerpiece. While Spike Jonze's Her was the festival's closing film.

Appearing in NYFF's "Main Slate" for the first time were: agnès b., Alain Guiraudie, Ben Stiller, Corneliu Porumboiu, Declan Lowney, James Franco, Jehane Noujaim, J. C. Chandor, Joe Brewster and Michèle Stephenson, Lav Diaz, Ralph Fiennes, Richard Curtis, Rithy Panh, and Sebastián Lelio.

The Festival also included talks with Richard Curtis, James Gray, Paul Greengrass, Agnieszka Holland, and Frederick Wiseman.

It was the first edition of the Festival following the retirement of longtime festival Artistic director Richard Peña, succeeded by Kent Jones. The lineup saw a larger Main Slate selection than prior years, the addition of the documentary and "Emerging Artists" sections, and the renaming of the previous "Masterworks" program as "Revivals".

The Jean-Luc Godard retrospective was programmed by Kent Jones and Jake Perlin, and Views from the Avant-Garde was programmed by Mark McElhatten. Convergence was curated by Matt Bolish and Eugene Hernandez.

== Official Selections ==
The primary selection committee included Kent Jones (chair), Dennis Lim, Marian Masone, Gavin Smith, and Amy Taubin.

=== Main Slate ===
The following films were selected:

English Title	Original Title	Director(s)	Production Country
About Time		Richard Curtis	United Kingdom
Abuse of Weakness	Abus de Faiblesse	Catherine Breillat	France, Germany, Belgium
Alan Partridge: Alpha Papa		Declan Lowney	United Kingdom, France
All Is Lost		J. C. Chandor	United States
American Promise		Joe Brewster and Michèle Stephenson	United States
At Berkeley		Frederick Wiseman	United States
Bastards	Les Salauds	Claire Denis	France, Germany
Blue Is the Warmest Colour	La Vie d'Adèle – Chapitres 1 & 2	Abdellatif Kechiche	France, Belgium, Spain
Burning Bush	Hořící keř	Agnieszka Holland	Czech Republic
Captain Phillips (opening film)		Paul Greengrass	United States
Child of God		James Franco	United States
Gloria		Sebastián Lelio	Chile, Spain
Her (closing film)		Spike Jonze	United States
The Immigrant		James Gray	United States
Inside Llewyn Davis		Joel and Ethan Coen	United States
The Invisible Woman		Ralph Fiennes	United Kingdom
Jealousy	La Jalousie	Philippe Garrel	France
Jimmy P: Psychotherapy of a Plains Indian		Arnaud Desplechin	France
Le Week-End		Roger Michell	United Kingdom, France
The Last of the Unjust	Le dernier des injustes	Claude Lanzmann	France, Austria
Like Father, Like Son	そして父になる	Hirokazu Kore-eda	Japan
The Missing Picture	រូបភាពដែលបាត់បង់	Rithy Panh	Cambodia, France
My Name Is Hmmm...	Je m'appelle Hmmm...	agnès b.	France
Nebraska		Alexander Payne	United States
Nobody's Daughter Haewon	누구의 딸도 아닌 해원	Hong Sang-soo	South Korea
Norte, the End of History	Norte, hangganan ng kasaysayan	Lav Diaz	Philippines
Omar	عمر	Hany Abu-Assad	Palestine
Only Lovers Left Alive		Jim Jarmusch	United Kingdom, Germany
Real	リアル〜完全なる首長竜の日〜	Kiyoshi Kurosawa	Japan
The Secret Life of Walter Mitty (centerpiece)		Ben Stiller	United States
The Square	الميدان	Jehane Noujaim	Egypt, United States
Stranger by the Lake	L'Inconnu du lac	Alain Guiraudie	France
Stray Dogs	郊遊	Tsai Ming-liang	Taiwan, France
A Touch of Sin	天注定	Jia Zhangke	China, Japan, France
When Evening Falls on Bucharest or Metabolism	Când se lasă seara peste București sau Metabolism	Corneliu Porumboiu	Romania
The Wind Rises	風立ちぬ	Hayao Miyazaki	Japan

=== Special Events ===
The following films were selected:

Title	Director	Production Country
12 Years a Slave	Steve McQueen	United Kingdom, United States, Luxembourg
Blue Jasmine	Woody Allen	United States
Dazed and Confused (1993)	Richard Linklater	United States

=== Spotlight on Documentary ===
The following films were selected:

English title	Original title	Director(s)	Production Country
Applied Science
Google and the World Brain		Ben Lewis	United Kingdom, Spain, Germany
Particle Fever		Mark Levinson	United States
Tim's Vermeer		Teller	United States
How Democracy Works Now
Ain't the AFL for Nothin'		Michael Camerini and Shari Robertson	United States
Brothers and Rivals		Michael Camerini and Shari Robertson	United States
The Game Is On		Michael Camerini and Shari Robertson	United States
The Kids Across the Hill		Michael Camerini and Shari Robertson	United States
Last Best Chance		Michael Camerini and Shari Robertson	United States
Marking Up the Dream		Michael Camerini and Shari Robertson	United States
Mountains and Clouds		Michael Camerini and Shari Robertson	United States
Protecting Arizona		Michael Camerini and Shari Robertson	United States
Sam in the Snow		Michael Camerini and Shari Robertson	United States
The Senate Speaks		Michael Camerini and Shari Robertson	United States
Motion Portraits
23 August 2008 (short)		Laura Mulvey, Faysal Abdullah and Mark Lewis	United Kingdom
Afternoon of a Faun: Tanaquil le Clercq		Nancy Buirski	United States
The Dog		Allison Berg and Frank Keraudren	United States
Fifi Howls From Happiness	فی‌فی از خوشحالی زوزه می‌کشد	Mitra Farahani	France, United States
In the Dark Room	Die Frau des Schakals	Nadav Schirman	Germany, Israel, Finland, Romania, Italy
Manakamana		Stephanie Spray and Pacho Velez	United States
What Now? Remind Me	E Agora? Lembra-me	Joaquim Pinto	Portugal
Who Is Dayani Cristal?		Marc Silver	United States, Mexico

=== Emerging Artists ===
The following films were selected:

English title	Original title	Director(s)	Production Country
Archipelago (2010)		Joanna Hogg	United Kingdom
Club Sandwich (2013)	Club sándwich	Fernando Eimbcke	Mexico
Duck Season (2004)	Temporada de patos	Fernando Eimbcke	Mexico
Exhibition (2013)		Joanna Hogg	United Kingdom
Lake Tahoe (2008)		Fernando Eimbcke	Mexico
Unrelated (2007)		Joanna Hogg	United Kingdom

=== Shorts Program ===
The following short films were selected:

English title	Original title	Director(s)	Production Country
Program 1
9-meter		Anders Walter	Denmark
The Air Mattress		David Kestin	United States
My Mind's Own Melody		Josh Wakely	Australia
Open House		David Kestin	United States
Samnang		Asaph Polonsky	United States
Tryouts		Susana Casares	United States
Program 2
#PostModem		Jillian Mayer and Lucas Leyva	United States
Basically		Ari Aster	United States
Butter Lamp	La lampe au beurre de yak	Hu Wei	France
Carny	Animador	Fernanda Chicolet	Brazil
Frayed		Georgia Oakley	United Kingdom
Subconscious Password		Chris Landreth	Canada
Uncle Şeref and His Shadow	Şeref Dayı ve Gölgesi	Buğra Dedeoğlu	Turkey
Program 3
L'Assenza		Jonathan Romney	United Kingdom
Aujourd'hui		Nicolas Saada	France
The Man Who Came Out Only At Night		Michael Almereyda	United States
Whiplash		Damien Chazelle	United States
Program 4
The King's Body	O Corpo de Afonso	João Pedro Rodrigues	Portugal
Prologue to the Great Desaparecido	Prologo sa ang Dakilang Desaparecido	Lav Diaz	Philippines
Redemption		Miguel Gomes	Portugal

=== Revivals ===
The following films were selected:

English title	Original title	Director(s)	Production Country
The Age of Innocence (1993)		Martin Scorsese	United States
Boy Meets Girl (1984)		Leos Carax	France
The Chase (1946)		Arthur Ripley	United States
The Lusty Men (1952)		Nicholas Ray	United States
Manila in the Claws of Light (1975)	Maynila: Sa mga kuko ng liwanag	Lino Brocka	Philippines
Mauvais Sang (1986)		Leos Carax	France
Mysterious Object at Noon (2000)	ดอกฟ้าในมือมาร	Apichatpong Weerasethakul	Thailand
Providence (1977)		Alain Resnais	France, Switzerland
Sandra (1965)	Vaghe stelle dell'Orsa	Luchino Visconti	Italy
The Sound of Fury (1950)		Cy Endfield	United States
They Live by Night (1948)		Nicholas Ray	United States

=== Retrospective ===
The following films were selected for the Jean-Luc Godard Retrospective, which was divided in two sections:

==== Feature films and paired shorts ====
English title	Original title	Director(s)	Production Country
Alphaville (1965)	Alphaville: une étrange aventure de Lemmy Caution	Jean-Luc Godard	France
Armide (1987)		Jean-Luc Godard	France
Band of Outsiders (1964)	Bande à part	Jean-Luc Godard	France
The Book of Mary (1985)	Le Livre de Marie	Anne-Marie Miéville	France, Switzerland
Breathless (1960)	À bout de souffle	Jean-Luc Godard	France
British Sounds (See You at Mao) (1969)		Jean-Luc Godard	France
Camera-Eye [from Far from Vietnam] (1967)	Caméra-oeil	Jean-Luc Godard	France
The Carabineers (1963)	Les Carabiniers	Jean-Luc Godard	France
La Chinoise (1967)	La Chinoise, ou plutôt à la Chinoise: un film en train de se faire	Jean-Luc Godard	France
Ciné-tracts [selections] (1968)		Jean-Luc Godard	France
Contempt (1963)	Le Mépris	Jean-Luc Godard	France, Italy
Détective (1985)		Jean-Luc Godard	France
Every Man for Himself (1980)	Sauve qui peut (la vie)	Jean-Luc Godard	Switzerland, France
A Film Like Any Other (1968)	Un Film comme les autres	Jean-Luc Godard	France
Film Socialisme (2010)		Jean-Luc Godard	France, Switzerland
First Name: Carmen (1983)	Prénom Carmen	Jean-Luc Godard	France
For Ever Mozart (1996)		Jean-Luc Godard	France, Switzerland
France/Tour/Detour/Two Children (1978)	France/tour/détour/deux enfants	Jean-Luc Godard	France
Germany Year 90 Nine Zero (1991)	Allemagne année 90 neuf zéro	Jean-Luc Godard	France
Hail Mary (1985)	Je vous salue, Marie	Jean-Luc Godard	France, Switzerland
Here and Elsewhere (1976)	Ici et ailleurs	Jean-Luc Godard	France
History(s) of the Cinema (1988–1998)	Histoire(s) du cinéma	Jean-Luc Godard	France, Switzerland
How's it going (1976)	Comment ça va	Jean-Luc Godard	France
In Praise of Love (2001)	Eloge de l'amour	Jean-Luc Godard	France, Switzerland
Hail Sarajevo (1993)	Je vous salue Sarajevo	Jean-Luc Godard	France
JLG/JLG: Self-Portrait in December (1994)	JLG/JLG, autoportrait de décembre	Jean-Luc Godard	France
Joy of Learning (1969)	Le Gai Savoir	Jean-Luc Godard	France
King Lear (1987)		Jean-Luc Godard	United States
Keep Your Right Up (1987)	Soigne ta droite	Jean-Luc Godard	France
Letter to Freddy Buache (1982)	Lettre à Freddy Buache	Jean-Luc Godard	France
Letter to Jane (1972)		Jean-Luc Godard and Jean-Pierre Gorin	France
Made in U.S.A. (1966)		Jean-Luc Godard	France
A Married Woman (1964)	Une femme mariée	Jean-Luc Godard	France
Masculin Féminin (1966)		Jean-Luc Godard	France
Notre musique (2004)		Jean-Luc Godard	France, Switzerland
Nouvelle Vague (1990)		Jean-Luc Godard	Switzerland, France
Number Two (1975)	Numéro deux	Jean-Luc Godard	France
Oh Woe Is Me (1993)	Hélas pour moi	Jean-Luc Godard	France, Switzerland
Passion (1982)		Jean-Luc Godard	France, Switzerland
Le petit soldat (1960)		Jean-Luc Godard	France
Pierrot le Fou (1965)		Jean-Luc Godard	France
Pravda (1969)		Jean-Luc Godard	West Germany, France
The Rise and Fall of a Small Film Company (1986)	Grandeur et décadence d'un petit commerce de cinéma	Jean-Luc Godard	France, Switzerland
Six Times Two: Over and Under Communication (1976)	Six fois deux, sur et sous la communication	Jean-Luc Godard	France
Small Notes Regarding the Film Hail Mary (1983)	Petites notes à propos du film Je vous salue, Marie	Jean-Luc Godard	France, Switzerland
Struggle in Italy (1971)	Luttes en Italie	Jean-Luc Godard	Italy, France
Sympathy for the Devil (1968)		Jean-Luc Godard	United Kingdom
Tout Va Bien (1972)		Jean-Luc Godard and Jean-Pierre Gorin	France
Two or Three Things I Know About Her (1967)	Deux ou trois choses que je sais d'elle	Jean-Luc Godard	France
Vivre sa vie (1962)		Jean-Luc Godard	France
A Woman Is a Woman (1961)	Une femme est une femme	Jean-Luc Godard	France
Weekend (1967)		Jean-Luc Godard	France
Wind from the East (1970)	Le Vent d'est	Jean-Luc Godard	Italy, France, West Germany
Vladimir and Rosa (1971)	Vladimir et Rosa	Jean-Luc Godard	France, West Germany

==== Short films ====
English title	Original title	Director(s)
60s Shorts
Anticipation: or Love in the Year 2000 [from The Oldest Profession in the World] (1967)	Anticipation, ou: l'amour en l'an 2000	Jean-Luc Godard
The Great Swindler [from The World's Most Beautiful Swindlers] (1964)	Le Grand escroc	Jean-Luc Godard
Montparnasse-Levallois [from Six in Paris] (1965)		Jean-Luc Godard
The New World [from Ro.Go.Pa.G.] (1963)	Il Nuovo mondo	Jean-Luc Godard
Sloth [from The Seven Deadly Sins] (1961)	La Paresse	Jean-Luc Godard
Early Shorts
All the Boys Are Called Patrick (1957)	Tous les garçons s'appellent Patrick	Jean-Luc Godard
Charlotte and Her Boyfriend (1955)	Charlotte et son Jules	Jean-Luc Godard
Operation Concrete (1955)	Opération béton	Jean-Luc Godard
A Story of Water (1958)	Une histoire d'eau	Jean-Luc Godard and François Truffaut
Program 1
Les Enfants jouent à la Russie (1993)		Jean-Luc Godard
Liberté et patrie (2002)		Jean-Luc Godard and Anne-Marie Miéville
The Old Place (2000)		Jean-Luc Godard and Anne-Marie Miéville
Origins of the 21st Century (2000)	De l'origine du XXIe siècle	Jean-Luc Godard
Pour Thomas Wainggai [from Lest We Forget] (1991)		Jean-Luc Godard and Anne-Marie Miéville
Program 2
The Power of Speech (1988)	Puissance de la parole	Jean-Luc Godard
Scénario du film Passion (1982)		Jean-Luc Godard
Scénario de Sauve qui peut (la vie) (1979)		Jean-Luc Godard
To Alter the Image (1982)	Changer d'image	Jean-Luc Godard
Program 3
The Darty Report (1989)	Le Rapport Darty	Jean-Luc Godard and Anne-Marie Miéville
Dream On (1977)	Faut pas rêver	Jean-Luc Godard
L'enfance de l'art (1991)		Jean-Luc Godard and Anne-Marie Miéville
The Last Word (1988)	Le Dernier mot	Jean-Luc Godard
Metamorphojean & Closed #1 and #2 (1990)		Jean-Luc Godard
Meetin' W.A. (1986)		Jean-Luc Godard
On s'est tous défilé (1988)		Jean-Luc Godard
Parisienne People Cigarettes (1992)		Jean-Luc Godard
Plus Oh (1996)		Jean-Luc Godard
Schick After Shave (1971)		Jean-Luc Godard
Une bonne à tout faire (1981)		Jean-Luc Godard
Program 4
2 x 50 Years of French Cinema (1995)	2 x 50 ans de cinéma français	Jean-Luc Godard and Anne-Marie Miéville
Adieu au TNS (1998)		Jean-Luc Godard
Dans le noir du temps (2002)		Jean-Luc Godard
Ecce Homo (2006)		Jean-Luc Godard
Hommage à Eric Rohmer (2010)		Jean-Luc Godard
Prayer for Refuseniks (2004)	Prière pour refusniks	Jean-Luc Godard
True False Passport (2006)	Vrai faux passeport	Jean-Luc Godard
