= Sandy Stern =

American film producer

- Born: New York City, United States
- Occupation: Film producer
- Years active: 1990–present
- Awards: Independent Spirit Award for Best First Feature; 2000 Being John Malkovich

Sandy Stern is an American film producer, known for his work on the films Pump Up the Volume (1990), Being John Malkovich (1999) and Saved! (2004).

== Career ==
Stern's first project, released in 1990, was the teen film Pump Up the Volume, which was nominated for a 1990 Independent Spirit Award for Best Film. He subsequently became executive producer of Equinox and Red Hot, released direct-to-video in 1992 and 1993 respectively. He met rock band R.E.M.'s lead singer Michael Stipe through Stern's friend Samantha Mathis' boyfriend, River Phoenix. At the time, Stern was producing with Sean Penn, and teamed up as producing partners with Stipe looking for a change. Together they executive produced Velvet Goldmine in 1998 and Freak City in 1999. They formed a production company, Single Cell, and their next project was Charlie Kaufman and Spike Jonze's 1999 film Being John Malkovich. Being John Malkovich won a 2000 Independent Spirit Award for Best First Feature, and Stern and fellow producers Stipe, Steve Golin and Vincent Landay were nominated for two Producers Guild of America Awards: the Motion Picture Producer of the Year Award and the Vision Award, winning the latter.

Stern and Stipe, teamed with producers Michael Ohoven and William Vince, produced the 2004 independent teen-comedy film Saved!, having spent years trying to persuade major financiers to fund the film, which, according to Stern, was a controversial film "that dealt with religion, that dealt with comedy and religion, that dealt with a gay storyline, and that was basically, it was all a kind of ensemble cast that did not have a Julia Roberts starring in the movie." After its US$9 million-grossing theatrical release through United Artists, Stern approached Elephant Eye Theatrical's CEO Stuart Oken about adapting the film into a musical, which premiered Off Broadway at Playwrights Horizons, New York City in May 2008.

== Personal life ==
Stern was raised in New York City by Jewish parents. He attended New York University, completing a Ph.D. in clinical psychology, but left to pursue filmmaking instead at Vassar College, where he came out as gay. He now resides in Los Angeles, California.
