= Dirt (magazine) =

Former American lifestyle magazine

- First issue: 1991
- Final issue: 1994
- Country: United States

Dirt was an American lifestyle magazine targeting young men. The magazine was launched in 1991 by Andy Jenkins, Spike Jonze, and Mark Lewman. Lewman, who served as editor-in-chief, said of the debut issue:

We're all about sports, music, movies, girls and junk food. We combine these topics with current events, celebrity quotes and true-life stories like our current profile of a Los Angeles gang member recently released from prison. We're mostly about a boy's basic concerns-with hard-edged pieces mixed in. ... Most of the stereotypes about guys are just wrong. I don't know any Bills and Teds.

Dirt later became part of Lang Communications and was headquartered in Seattle, Washington. The magazine folded in 1994.

== See also ==
- List of defunct American magazines
