= Lick the Star =

1998 film directed by Sofia Coppola

- Directed by: Sofia Coppola
- Written by: Sofia Coppola; Stephanie Hayman
- Produced by: Sofia Coppola; Andrew Durham; Christopher Neil
- Starring: Christina Turley; Audrey Heaven; Robert Schwartzman; Peter Bogdanovich; Zoe Cassavetes; Anthony DeSimone
- Cinematography: Lance Acord
- Edited by: Eric Zumbrunnen
- Distributed by: Film Movement
- Release date: October 1998
- Running time: 14 min.
- Language: English

Lick the Star is a 14-minute-long black and white 16mm short film, and the first film written and directed by Sofia Coppola.

The film is included as a bonus feature on the DVD for the film HOP from Film Movement. It was also included as a bonus feature on the 2018 The Criterion Collection release of The Virgin Suicides.

== Plot ==
Kate has been absent from seventh grade for a week due to a broken foot. She frets about returning, as she knows how quickly things can change during junior high, and wonders what she has missed. Upon arriving, she learns her clique of friends, led by queen bee Chloe, have developed a catchphrase: "lick the star." The phrase holds mysterious significance to the group, but Kate's absence left her out of the loop, just as she feared.

That afternoon, Chloe and the others reveal to Kate that "lick the star" is "kill the rats" backwards, the codename of their plan to use arsenic to poison boys at their school, inspired by Chloe's obsession with the book Flowers in the Attic. The girls shoplift rat poison and break into the targeted boys' lockers to contaminate their lunches, then hide behind the bleachers for secret "lick the star" meetings. During one such meeting, Kate is caught by a teacher while holding Chloe's cigarette, leading to Kate being suspended and another extended absence from school.

While Kate is gone, Chloe learns about slavery in history class. On the bus after school, she expresses astonishment at the idea that her Black friend Nadine would have once been enslaved. A case of broken telephone distorts the poorly phrased but innocent remark until the entire school believes Chloe is racist. In despair, Chloe attempts suicide, but her failed effort only provides more gossip for her classmates. Returning to school after the suicide attempt, Chloe finds her former friends have revealed the "lick the star" plot to the other students, leading to further ridicule.

Kate returns to school to discover that the entire social hierarchy has shifted: the once-powerful Chloe is now an outcast and the girls Chloe previously bullied no longer fear her. Kate realizes she can no longer be seen with Chloe or she, too, will be ostracized. Kate watches from a distance as Chloe, sitting by herself, writes a short poem about how quickly things change. Chloe tucks the poem into the book that appears to be her new obsession—An American Biography (the biography of model Edie Sedgwick) by Jean Stein—before she walks away alone.

== Production ==
Principal filming was done at RLS Junior High School in Pebble Beach, California.

Peter Bogdanovich appears in a cameo as the Principal. The director of photography was Lance Acord. Coppola's own eye appears in one dream-like shot.

The film's themes also appear in Coppola's later work, such as the feelings of isolation; in addition, the film begins with a car journey, just like her later films The Virgin Suicides, Lost in Translation, and Somewhere.

== Soundtrack ==
1. "Tipp City" – The Amps
2. "Top 40" – Free Kitten
3. "Bouwerie Boy" – Free Kitten
4. "This Town" – The Go-Go's
5. "Eat Cake" – Free Kitten
6. "Heidi Cakes" – Land of the Loops
