= Hello Tomorrow (advertisement) =

"Hello Tomorrow" is the title of a 2005 Adidas television advertisement, and also the name of the song used in the commercial. The 90-second spot was created by Oscar-nominated film director Spike Jonze for ad agency TBWA\Chiat\Day to advertise the adidas 1 "intelligent" sneakers. The title song was composed specifically for the advertisement by Jonze's brother, Sam "Squeak E. Clean" Spiegel, and its lyrics were sung by Jonze's then-girlfriend, Karen O of the Grammy-nominated rock band Yeah Yeah Yeahs. Proving to be an incredibly successful commercial, Hello Tomorrow received many honors; these include two Gold Lions at the 2005 Cannes Lions International Advertising Festival, three 2006 Silver Clio Awards, and a 2006 Gold EFFIE Award.

In the visual effects-laden commercial, a man (played by actor David Douglas) wakes up in his bed- which, along with a lamp, is in an otherwise dark space- as his adidas_1 sneakers bounce onto his feet and tie their own laces. He then travels through many city streets, and at one point is chased through a forest by a bear. In all of the scenes, light is only created behind the man by the steps he takes; he is almost always running into darkness. Similar to the chase scene near the end of Jonze's film Being John Malkovich, the man frequently jumps from one plane to another, as the camera rotates to show that a wall or ceiling has become the floor. After running head-first into a fire hydrant, the man yawns, returns to his bed (which, from where he is standing, is on the wall), and goes to sleep. Finally, as the shoes tumble away from the camera, shown onscreen are the slogan for the adidas_1, "World's First Intelligent Shoe," followed by the Adidas slogan "Impossible is Nothing" and the Adidas logo.

After working together on "Hello Tomorrow", which was officially released on iTunes, Squeak E. Clean produced Yeah Yeah Yeahs' second full-length album, Show Your Bones. That album's first single, "Gold Lion", was named after the awards won by the commercial in Cannes.
