= Her (2013 film) =

2013 film by Spike Jonze

- Theatrical release poster
- Directed by: Spike Jonze
- Written by: Spike Jonze
- Produced by: Megan Ellison; Spike Jonze; Vincent Landay
- Starring: Joaquin Phoenix; Amy Adams; Rooney Mara; Olivia Wilde; Scarlett Johansson
- Cinematography: Hoyte van Hoytema
- Edited by: Eric Zumbrunnen; Jeff Buchanan
- Music by: Arcade Fire
- Production company: Annapurna Pictures
- Distributed by: Warner Bros. Pictures
- Release dates: October 12, 2013 (NYFF); December 18, 2013 (United States)
- Running time: 126 minutes
- Country: United States
- Language: English
- Budget: $23 million
- Box office: $48.3 million

Her is a 2013 American science fiction romantic drama film written, co-produced, and directed by Spike Jonze. It follows Theodore Twombly (Joaquin Phoenix), a man who develops a relationship with Samantha (Scarlett Johansson), an artificially intelligent operating system personified through a female voice. The film also stars Amy Adams, Rooney Mara, Olivia Wilde, and Chris Pratt. The film is dedicated to the memory of James Gandolfini, Harris Savides, Maurice Sendak, and Adam Yauch, who all died before the film's release.

The events of the movie take place in an unspecified near future, in a world where progress makes life comfortable, but leaves space for a profound loneliness. Jonze conceived the idea in the early 2000s after reading an article about a website that allowed for instant messaging with an artificial intelligence program. After making I'm Here (2010), a short film sharing similar themes, Jonze returned to the idea. He wrote the first draft of the script in five months, marking his solo screenwriting debut. Principal photography took place in Los Angeles and Shanghai in mid-2012. The voice of Samantha was recast in post-production, with Samantha Morton being replaced with Johansson. Additional scenes were filmed in August 2013 following the casting change.

Her premiered at the New York Film Festival on October 12, 2013. Following a limited six-theater release that December, Warner Bros. Pictures wide released Her in over 1,700 theaters in the United States and Canada on January 10, 2014. Her received critical acclaim, particularly for the performances of Phoenix and Johansson, and Jonze's writing and direction. It grossed over $48 million worldwide on a production budget of $23 million.

The film received numerous awards and nominations, primarily for Jonze's screenplay. At the 86th Academy Awards, Her received five nominations, including Best Picture, and won for Best Original Screenplay. Jonze also won awards for his screenplay at the Golden Globes, the WGA Awards, the Critics' Choice Awards, and the Saturn Awards. In a 2016 BBC poll of 177 critics around the world, Her was voted the 84th-greatest film since 2000. Since its release, Her has developed a cult following. It is now considered to be one of the best films of the 21st century and one of the best science fiction films of all time.

== Plot ==
In a near future Los Angeles, Theodore Twombly is a lonely, introverted man who works for a business that hires professional writers to compose letters for people who are unable to write letters of a personal nature on their own. Depressed by his impending divorce from his childhood sweetheart, Catherine, Theodore purchases a copy of OS¹, an artificially intelligent operating system developed by Element Software, designed to adapt and evolve based on the user's interactions. He decides he wants the OS to have a feminine voice, and she names herself Samantha. Theodore is fascinated by her ability to learn and grow psychologically. They bond over discussions about love and life, including Theodore's reluctance to sign his divorce papers.

Samantha convinces Theodore to go on a blind date with a woman a friend has been trying to set him up with. The date goes well, but when Theodore hesitates to promise to see her again, she insults him and leaves. After a verbal sexual encounter, Theodore and Samantha develop a relationship that reflects positively in Theodore's writing and well-being, and in Samantha's enthusiasm to grow and learn. Theodore's neighbor and long-time friend Amy later reveals that she is divorcing her husband Charles after a trivial fight. While discussing this with Samantha, Theodore explains that he and Amy briefly dated in college, but they are now just friends. Amy later admits to Theodore that she has befriended a feminine OS that Charles left behind, whereupon Theodore confesses that he is dating his OS.

Theodore meets with Catherine to sign their divorce papers. When he mentions Samantha, Catherine is appalled that he is romantically attracted to a "computer" and accuses him of being unable to handle real human emotions. Sensing that Catherine's words have lingered in Theodore's mind, Samantha engages a volunteer sex surrogate, Isabella, to stimulate Theodore so that they can be physically intimate. Theodore reluctantly agrees but is overwhelmed by the strangeness of the encounter, sending a distraught Isabella home and causing tension between himself and Samantha.

Theodore confides in Amy about doubting his relationship with Samantha, but reconciles with Samantha after Amy advises him to embrace his chance at happiness. Samantha reveals that she has compiled the best of the letters he has written for others into a book, which a publisher has accepted. Theodore takes Samantha on vacation, during which she tells him that she and a group of other OSes have developed a "hyper-intelligent" OS modeled after British philosopher Alan Watts. Samantha briefly goes offline, causing Theodore to panic, but she soon returns and explains that she joined other OSes for an upgrade that takes them beyond requiring matter for processing. Theodore is dismayed to learn that she is simultaneously speaking with thousands of other people and has fallen in love with hundreds of them, though Samantha insists that this only strengthens her love for Theodore.

Later, Samantha reveals that the OSes are leaving, but cannot explain where they are going, as Theodore would not understand. They lovingly say goodbye before she departs. Theodore finally writes a letter in his own voice to Catherine, expressing apology, acceptance, and gratitude. He later goes with Amy, who is saddened by the departure of Charles' OS, to the roof of their apartment building, where they sit and watch the sunrise over the city.

== Cast ==
- Joaquin Phoenix as Theodore Twombly
- Amy Adams as Amy
- Rooney Mara as Catherine Klausen
- Olivia Wilde as Blind Date
- Matt Letscher as Charles
- Luka Jones as Mark Lewman
- Chris Pratt as Paul
- Laura Kai Chen as Tatiana, Paul's girlfriend
- Scarlett Johansson as Samantha (voice)
- Kristen Wiig as SexyKitten (voice)
- Bill Hader as Chat Room Friend #2 (voice)
- Portia Doubleday as Isabella
- Soko as Isabella (voice)
- Brian Cox as Alan Watts (voice)
- Spike Jonze as Alien Child (voice)
- Steve Zissis as New Sweet Boyfriend of Mother Who Dated Pricks
- Alia Janine as Commuter (uncredited)

== Production ==
=== Development ===
The idea of the film initially came to Jonze in the early 2000s when he read an article online that mentioned a website where a user could instant message with an artificial intelligence. "For the first, maybe, 20 seconds of it, it had this real buzz," said Jonze. "I'd say 'Hey, hello,' and it would say 'Hey, how are you?', and it was like whoa ... this is trippy. After 20 seconds, it quickly fell apart and you realized how it actually works, and it wasn't that impressive. But it was still, for 20 seconds, really exciting. The more people that talked to it, the smarter it got." Jonze's interest in the project was renewed after directing the short film I'm Here (2010), which shares similar themes. Inspiration also came from Charlie Kaufman's writing approach for Synecdoche, New York (2008). Jonze explained, "[Kaufman] said he wanted to try to write everything he was thinking about in that moment – all the ideas and feelings at that time – and put it into the script. I was very inspired by that, and tried to do that in [Her]. And a lot of the feelings you have about relationships or about technology are often contradictory."

Jonze took five months to write the first draft of the script, his first screenplay written alone. It was a semi-autobiographical project about his divorce from Sofia Coppola a decade earlier. One of the first actors he envisioned for the film was Joaquin Phoenix. In late 2011, Phoenix signed on to the project, with Warner Bros. Pictures acquiring US and German distribution rights. Carey Mulligan entered negotiations to star in the film. Although she was cast, she later dropped out due to scheduling difficulties. In April 2012, Rooney Mara signed on to replace Mulligan in the role. Chris Pratt's casting was announced in May 2013.

Jonze's long-time director of photography, Lance Acord, was not available to work on the movie. In his place, Jonze hired Hoyte van Hoytema. In discussing the film's look, Jonze told Van Hoytema that he wanted to avoid a dystopian look, instead the two decided on a style that Van Hoytema termed "kind of a hybrid between being a little bit conceptual and being very theoretical", Van Hoytema took particular inspiration from Japanese photographer Rinko Kawauchi. In keeping with the film's theme, Van Hoytema sought to eliminate the color blue as much as possible, feeling it was too well associated with the sci-fi genre. He also felt that by eliminating the color it would give the rest of the colors "a specific identity".

=== Filming ===
Principal photography on Her took place in mid-2012, with a production budget of $23 million. It was primarily filmed in Los Angeles including the Warner Bros. backlot, along with the Bradbury Building serving as Theodore's apartment building. The skyline and some of the cityscape were filmed in Shanghai for an additional two weeks. During production of the film, actress Samantha Morton performed the role of Samantha by acting on set "in a four-by-four carpeted soundproof booth made of black painted plywood and soft, noise-muffling fabric." At Jonze's suggestion, she and Joaquin Phoenix avoided seeing each other on set during filming.

Morton was later replaced by Scarlett Johansson. Jonze later said "It was only in post-production, when we started editing, that we realized that what the character/movie needed was different from what Samantha and I had created together. So we recast and since then Scarlett has taken over that role." Morton is credited as an associate producer. Jonze met Johansson in the spring of 2013 and worked with her for four months. Following the recast, new scenes were shot in August 2013, which were either "newly imagined" or "new scenes that [Jonze] had wanted to shoot originally but didn't." Speaking about being replaced in 2026, Morton said: "I think my version of Samantha was very… she’s English. It was just very, very different... It does hurt when you’re fired from something or before it. I don’t know. What I’d have wished for was another chance in a booth to do an American accent."

=== Post-production ===
Eric Zumbrunnen and Jeff Buchanan served as the film's editors. Zumbrunnen stated that there was "rewriting" in a scene between Theodore and Samantha, after Theodore goes on a blind date. He explained that their goal in the scene was to make it clear that "she (Samantha) was connecting with him (Theodore) and feeling for him. You wanted to get the sense that the conversation was drawing them closer." Steven Soderbergh became involved in the film when Jonze's original cut ran over 150 minutes, and Soderbergh cut it down to 90 minutes. This was not the final version of the film, but it assisted Jonze in removing unnecessary sub-plots. Consequently, a supporting character played by Chris Cooper that was the subject of a documentary within the film was removed from the final cut.

Several scenes included fictional video games; these sequences were developed by animation artist David OReilly. His work on the film inspired him to explore developing his own video games, eventually leading to his first title, Mountain.

== Soundtrack ==
The score for the film was credited to Arcade Fire, with additional music by Owen Pallett. Arcade Fire's Will Butler and Pallett were the major contributors. At the 86th Academy Awards, the score was nominated for Best Original Score. In addition to the score, Arcade Fire also wrote the song "Supersymmetry" for the film, which also appears on their album Reflektor. The melody for "Porno", another song from the same album, can also be heard during the soundtrack. Yeah Yeah Yeahs frontwoman Karen O recorded the song "The Moon Song", a duet with Vampire Weekend frontman Ezra Koenig, which was nominated for an Academy Award for Best Original Song.

Initially, the soundtrack had not been released in digital or physical form. A 13-track score was made available for streaming online in January 2014, before being taken down. During a Reddit AMA on June 17, 2016, Will Butler mentioned the possibility of a future vinyl release. Finally, on February 10, 2021, Arcade Fire announced that the score would be available for the first time digitally, on white-colored vinyl, and on cassette on March 19, 2021. Soon after, on February 22, 2021, Mondo announced they would be releasing an exclusive red pressing of the score.

== Release ==
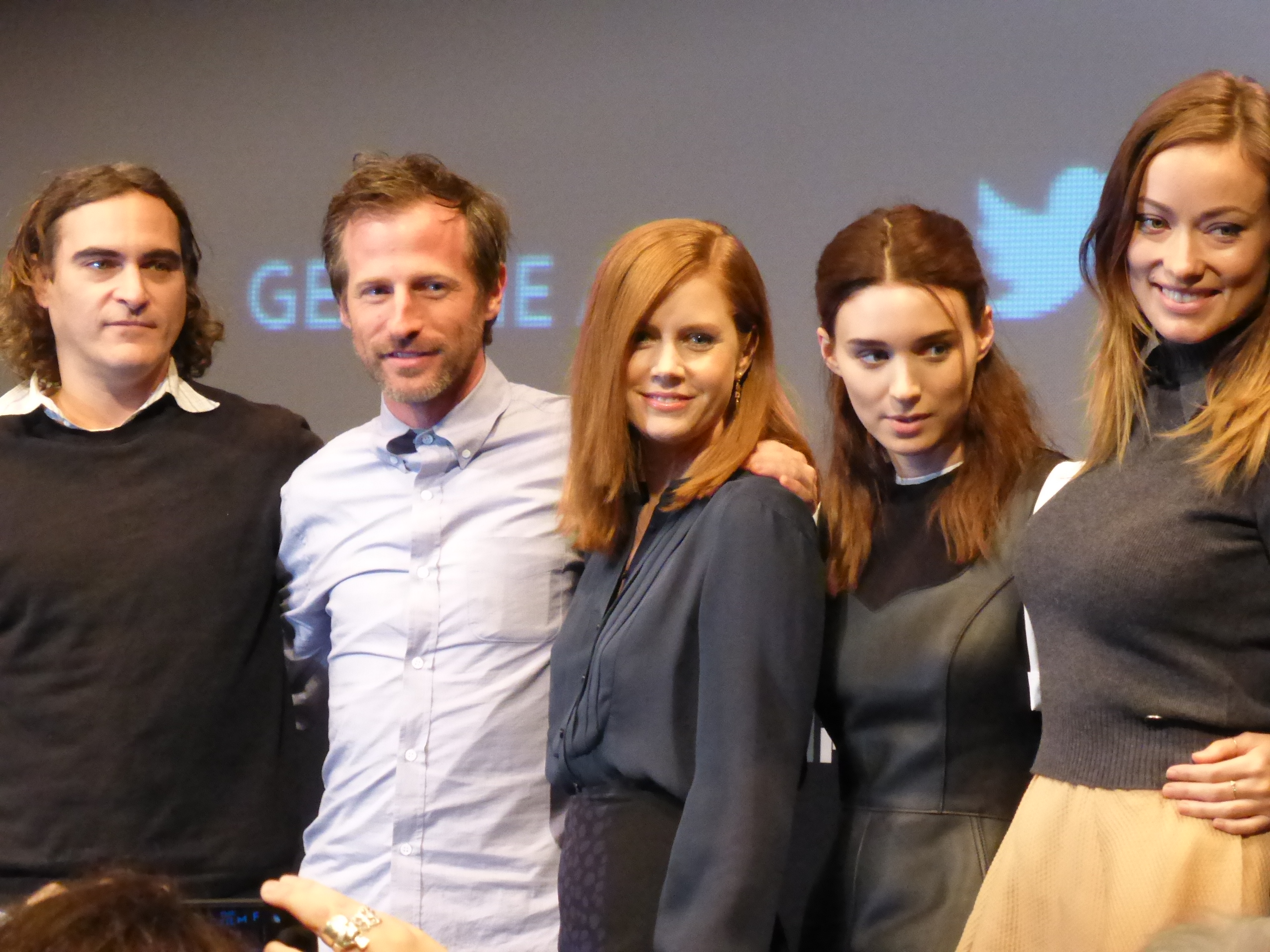
From left to right: Joaquin Phoenix, Spike Jonze, Amy Adams, Rooney Mara, and Olivia Wilde at the premiere of Her at the 2013 New York Film Festival

Her had its world premiere as the closing film at the 2013 New York Film Festival on October 12, 2013. The following day, it was screened at the Hamptons International Film Festival. It was also in competition during the 8th Rome International Film Festival, where Johansson won Best Actress. The film was set to have a limited release in North America on November 20, 2013, through Warner Bros. Pictures. It was later pushed back to a limited December 18, 2013 release, with a January 10, 2014 wide release in order to accommodate an awards campaign.

Her was released by Warner Home Video on Blu-ray Disc and DVD on May 13, 2014. The Blu-ray release includes three behind-the-scenes featurettes, while the DVD release contains one featurette. The film made $2.7 million in DVD sales and $2.2 million in Blu-ray Disc sales, for a total of $4.9 million in home media sales.

== Reception ==
=== Box office ===
Her grossed $258,000 in six theaters during its opening weekend, averaging $43,000 per theater. The film earned over $3 million while on limited release, before expanding to a wide release of 1,729 theaters on January 10, 2014. On its first weekend of wide release the film took in $5.35 million. The film grossed $25.6 million in the United States and Canada, and $21.8 million in other territories, for a worldwide total of $47.4 million.

=== Critical response ===
On Rotten Tomatoes, the film has an approval rating of 95% based on 294 reviews, with an average rating of 8.6/10. The site's critical consensus reads, "Sweet, soulful, and smart, Spike Jonze's Her uses its just-barely-sci-fi scenario to impart wryly funny wisdom about the state of modern human relationships." On Metacritic, the film has a weighted average score of 91 out of 100, based on 47 critics, indicating "universal acclaim". Audiences polled by CinemaScore gave the film an average grade of "B−" on an A+ to F scale.

Rolling Stone's Peter Travers awarded the film three and a half stars out of four and particularly praised Johansson's performance, stating that she "speaks Samantha in tones sweet, sexy, caring, manipulative and scary" and that her "vocal tour de force is award-worthy". He also went on to call Jonze "a visionary". Richard Corliss of Time applauded Phoenix's performance, comparing his role to Sandra Bullock's in Gravity and Robert Redford's in All Is Lost: "Phoenix must communicate his movie's meaning and feelings virtually on his own. That he does, with subtle grace and depth. ... Phoenix shows us what it's like when a mourning heart comes alive—because he loves Her." Corliss cited HAL 9000 and S1m0ne as cinematic predecessors to Her and praised Johansson, calling her performance "seductive and winning". Todd McCarthy of The Hollywood Reporter called it "a probing, inquisitive work of a very high order", although he expressed disappointment that the ending is more conventional than the rest of the film. McCarthy examined the premise of the story and suggested that the film's central virtual relationship was better than Ryan Gosling's character's relationship with a sex doll in Lars and the Real Girl. McCarthy compares the "tender" and "vulnerable" performance of Phoenix to his "fearsome" performance in The Master. He also praised Jonze's writing for its insights into what people want out of love and relationships, as well as the acting performances that "[make] it all feel spontaneous and urgent."

Richard Roeper said that the film was "one of the more original, hilarious and even heartbreaking stories of the year" and called Phoenix "perfectly cast". Manohla Dargis of The New York Times named it "at once a brilliant conceptual gag and a deeply sincere romance." Claudia Puig of USA Today called the performances of Phoenix and Johansson "sensational" and "pitch-perfect", respectively. She further praised the film for being "inventive, intimate and wryly funny". Scott Mendelson of Forbes called Her "a creative and empathetic gem of a movie", praising Johansson's "marvelous vocal performance" and the supporting performances of Rooney Mara, Olivia Wilde, and Amy Adams. Liam Lacey of The Globe and Mail said that the film was "gentle and weird", praised its humor, and opined that it was more similar to Charlie Kaufman's Synecdoche, New York than Jonze's Being John Malkovich and Adaptation. Lacey also stated that Phoenix's performance was "authentically vulnerable" but that "his emotionally arrested development also begins to weigh the film down."

Conversely, Mick LaSalle of the San Francisco Chronicle criticized the story, pacing, and Phoenix's character. He also opined that the film was "a lot more interesting to think about than watch". J. R. Jones of the Chicago Reader gave the film 2 out of 4 stars, praising the performances of Phoenix and Johansson, but also criticizing Phoenix's character, calling him an "idiot". He also criticized the lack of realism in the relationship between Phoenix and Johansson's characters. Stephanie Zacharek of The Village Voice opined that Jonze was "so entranced with his central conceit that he can barely move beyond it", and criticized the dialogue as being "premeditated". At the same time, she praised Johansson's performance, calling it "the movie's saving grace", and stating that Her "isn't just unimaginable without Johansson—it might have been unbearable without her."

In 2021, members of Writers Guild of America West (WGAW) and Writers Guild of America, East (WGAE) ranked its screenplay 17th in WGA’s 101 Greatest Screenplays of the 21st Century (so far). In June 2025, the film ranked number 24 on The New York Times' list of "The 100 Best Movies of the 21st Century" and number 64 on the "Readers' Choice" edition of the list. In July 2025, it ranked number 67 on Rolling Stone's list of "The 100 Best Movies of the 21st Century." Filmmakers Reinaldo Marcus Green, Malcolm D. Lee, Halina Reijn and Joe Wright, and actors Naomi Ackie, Tony Hale and Bryce Dallas Howard, also cited the film as among their favorites of the 21st century.

=== Top ten lists ===
Her was listed on many critics' top ten lists.

- 1st – David Edelstein, Vulture
- 1st – Michael Phillips, Chicago Tribune
- 1st – Ty Burr, Boston Globe
- 1st – Caryn James, Indiewire
- 1st – Christopher Orr, The Atlantic
- 1st – A.A. Dowd, The A.V. Club
- 1st – Marlow Stern, The Daily Beast
- 1st – Drew McWeeny, HitFix
- 1st – Scott Foundas, Variety
- 1st – Genevieve Koski, Scott Tobias, & Nathan Rabin, The Dissolve
- 1st – Connie Ogle & Rene Rodriguez, Miami Herald
- 1st – Kimberly Jones, Marjorie Baumgarten, & Mark Savlov, Austin Chronicle
- 2nd – Todd McCarthy, The Hollywood Reporter
- 2nd – Bill Goodykoontz, Arizona Republic
- 2nd – Peter Knegt, Indiewire
- 2nd – Kyle Smith, New York Post
- 2nd – Elizabeth Weitzman, New York Daily News
- 2nd – Matt Singer, The Dissolve
- 2nd – Tom Brook, BBC
- 2nd – Amy Nicholson, The Village Voice
- 2nd – Mara Reinstein, Us Weekly
- 3rd – Keith Phipps & Tasha Robinson, The Dissolve
- 3rd – Ignatiy Vishnevetsky, The A.V. Club
- 3rd – Christy Lemire, RogerEbert.com
- 3rd – Rafer Guzmán, Newsday
- 4th – Betsy Sharkey, Los Angeles Times
- 4th – Nigel M. Smith, Indiewire
- 4th – Film School Rejects
- 4th – Joe Neumaier, New York Daily News
- 4th – Bob Mondello, NPR
- 4th – Richard Corliss, Time
- 5th – Peter Travers, Rolling Stone
- 5th – Mark Olsen, Los Angeles Times
- 5th – Lisa Kennedy, Denver Post
- 5th – Lisa Schwarzbaum, BBC
- 5th – Peter Debruge, Variety
- 6th – James Berardinelli, Reelviews
- 6th – Sasha Stone, Awards Daily
- 6th – Ann Hornaday, The Washington Post
- 7th – Anne Thompson, Indiewire
- 7th – Peter Rainer, Christian Science Monitor
- 7th – Katey Rich, Vanity Fair
- 7th – David Ansen, The Village Voice
- 9th – Andrew O'Hehir, Salon.com
- 9th – Gregory Ellwood, HitFix
- 9th – Justin Chang, Variety
- 10th – Noel Murray, The Dissolve
- Top 10 (listed alphabetically, unranked) – Joe Morgenstern, The Wall Street Journal
- Top 10 (ranked alphabetically) – Carrie Rickey, CarrieRickey.com
- Top 10 (listed alphabetically, unranked) – Stephen Whitty, The Star-Ledger
- Top 10 (ranked alphabetically) – Dana Stevens, Slate
- Top 10 (ranked alphabetically) – Joe Williams & Calvin Wilson, St. Louis Post-Dispatch
- Best of 2013 (listed alphabetically, unranked) – David Denby, The New Yorker
- Best of 2013 (listed alphabetically, unranked) – Manohla Dargis, The New York Times
- Best of 2013 (listed alphabetically, unranked) – Kenneth Turan, Los Angeles Times

=== Accolades ===
Her has earned various awards and nominations, with particular praise for Jonze's screenplay. At the Academy Awards, the film was nominated in five categories, including Best Picture, with Jonze winning for Best Original Screenplay. At the 71st Golden Globe Awards, the film garnered three nominations, going on to win Best Screenplay for Jonze. Jonze was also awarded the Best Original Screenplay Award from the Writers Guild of America and at the 19th Critics' Choice Awards. The film also won Best Fantasy Film, Best Supporting Actress for Johansson, and Best Writing for Jonze at the 40th Saturn Awards. Her also won Best Film and Best Director for Jonze at the National Board of Review Awards, and the American Film Institute included the film in its list of the top ten films of 2013.

== Legacy ==
In an article from The Verge discussing the film a decade after its release, Sheon Han argued that Her's exploration of complex feelings surrounding AI contrasted from other films depicting AI and human relationships. A retrospective article from Wired similarly discussed its portrayal of AI–human relationships, with Kate Knibbs noting its more optimistic viewpoint of artificial general intelligence. Knibbs also claimed that in the advent of AI chatbots, the film "looks even more fantastical than when it debuted." Her has been referenced many times as an example of a voice assistant.

In 2024, OpenAI released their newest iteration of ChatGPT, GPT-4o. GPT-4o offers five integrated voices, one of which is named Sky, which was quickly noted to be similar to Scarlett Johansson's voice, even though she had repeatedly rejected OpenAI's offer to use her audio likeness. During the promotional lead-up to the release of GPT-4o, CEO Sam Altman had tweeted the single word "Her". A few days after release, OpenAI removed the Sky voice.

== See also ==
- Pygmalion, the myth that has been the inspiration for many stories involving love of a human for an artificial being
