= How They Get There =

1997 film by Spike Jonze

- Directed by: Spike Jonze
- Written by: Mark Gonzales; Spike Jonze
- Produced by: Vincent Landay
- Starring: Rico Bueno; Lauren Curry; Mark Gonzales
- Cinematography: Lance Acord
- Edited by: Eric Zumbrunnen
- Distributed by: Palm Pictures
- Release date: 1997
- Running time: 3 minutes
- Country: United States
- Language: English

How They Get There is a 1997 short film directed by Spike Jonze, which illustrates how lonely shoes wind up in the gutter. It is featured on The Work of Director Spike Jonze DVD and can currently be viewed on YouTube. The film does not contain any dialogue.

== Plot ==
The opening shot is of a shoe lying in the gutter. It belongs to a man who is leaning against a parked car drinking a carton of milk. After a moment, the owner of the car then angrily tells him to stop. As the man walks off, he spots a woman across the road and as he stumbles on the curb - the woman mimics him. He looks at her oddly. She again copies him as he discards his milk carton on a fence and swings his arms. They continue mimicking each other until we see that the man is approaching a crossing in the road. However, the man is enjoying the game too much to realise the danger and continues to imitate the woman who is trying to warn him of the oncoming traffic. He is then struck by a car which flips over and forces his shoe to fly through the air and land in the gutter.

== Music ==
The music playing through the movie is "Sentimental Journey" by Juan García Esquivel (originally written by Les Brown and Ben Home).

== Cast ==
- Rico Bueno as Angry Man
- Lauren Curry as Girl
- Mark Gonzales as Guy
