= Amarillo by Morning (film) =

1997 documentary film by Spike Jonze

- Directed by: Spike Jonze
- Produced by: Jeff Armstrong; Andy Gulliman; David Smith
- Starring: Spike Jonze; Clint Barr; Charisse Fruge; Joey Stern; Bryan James 'B.J.' Bowden; Mati Schayer; John Wesley McJunkin; John Wheeler
- Edited by: Eric Zumbrunnen
- Distributed by: Palm Pictures
- Release date: 1998
- Running time: 29 minutes
- Language: English

Amarillo by Morning is a documentary short by Spike Jonze.

== Synopsis ==
While filming pro bullriders for a commercial at the national rodeo in the Houston Astrodome in Houston, Texas, Spike befriended two suburban teenagers who aspired to be cowboys. The documentary chronicles an afternoon in their lives.

== Release ==
Amarillo by Morning was initially screened in 1997, his first released documentary and second film. The short was re-released in 2003 by Palm Pictures as part of a collection of Jonze's "music videos, short films, documentaries, and rarities", accompanied by interviews and commentaries on the director's works.

In 2009 Amarillo by Morning was screened at the Museum of Modern Art in New York City as part of a retrospective on Jonze's work.

== Reception ==
Critical reception for the short after its initial release has been positive. In the book ReFocus: The Films of Spike Jonze Laurel Westrup noted that the short "diverges substantially from the irreverent charm of his narrative ads and music videos. However, it reveals some key thematic features and an emphasis on creative collaboration that carry into the Suburbs films." The Village Voice has also praised the work, calling it "a perfect, unpretentious short doc tagging a crew of suburbanite Houston teens who get together to ride a homemade mechanical bull and dream of future rodeo glory. "
