= Spike Jonze =

American filmmaker (born 1969)

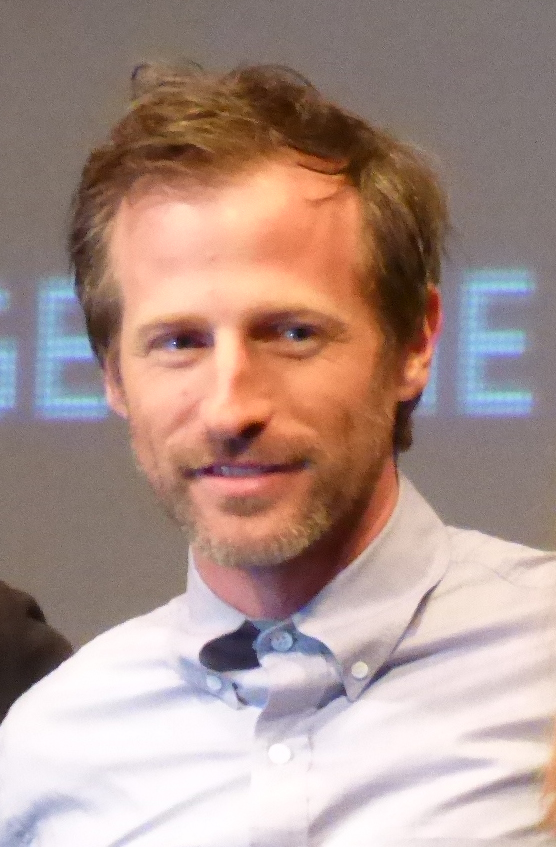
- Jonze at the 2013 New York Film Festival
- Born: Adam Spiegel; October 22, 1969 (age 57); New York City, U.S.
- Occupations: Film director; film producer; screenwriter; cinematographer; film editor; actor; musician; photographer
- Years active: 1985–present
- Spouse: Sofia Coppola (m. 1999; div. 2003)
- Partner: Allie Teilz (2019–2025)
- Children: 3
- Relatives: Sam Spiegel (brother); Arthur Spiegel (great-grandfather); Joseph Spiegel (great-great-grandfather)
- Awards: Full list

Adam Spiegel (born October 22, 1969), known professionally as Spike Jonze (/dʒoʊnz/, same pronunciation as "Jones"), is an American filmmaker, screenwriter, actor, musician, and photographer. His work includes films, commercials, music videos, skateboard videos and television.

Jonze began his career as a teenager photographing BMX riders and skateboarders for Freestylin' Magazine and Transworld Skateboarding, and co-founding the youth culture magazine Dirt. Moving into filmmaking, he began shooting street skateboarding films, including the influential Video Days (1991). Jonze co-founded the skateboard company Girl Skateboards in 1993 with riders Rick Howard and Mike Carroll. Jonze's filmmaking style made him an in-demand director of music videos for much of the 1990s and early 2000s, resulting in collaborations with R.E.M., Sonic Youth, Beastie Boys, Ween, Fatboy Slim, Daft Punk, Weezer, Yeah Yeah Yeahs, Björk, Fatlip, Arcade Fire and Kanye West.

Jonze began his feature film directing career with Being John Malkovich (1999) and Adaptation (2002), both written by Charlie Kaufman; the former earned Jonze an Academy Award nomination for Best Director. He was a co-creator and executive producer of MTV's Jackass reality franchise. Jonze later began directing films based on his own screenplays, including Where the Wild Things Are (2009) and Her (2013); for the latter film, he won the Academy Award, Golden Globe, and the Writers Guild of America Award for Best Original Screenplay, while receiving Academy Award nominations for Best Picture and Best Original Song ("The Moon Song").

He has worked as an actor sporadically throughout his career, co-starring in David O. Russell's war comedy Three Kings (1999) and appearing in supporting roles in Bennett Miller's Moneyball (2011) and Martin Scorsese's The Wolf of Wall Street (2013), in addition to a recurring role in comedy series The Increasingly Poor Decisions of Todd Margaret (2010–2012) and cameo appearances in his own films. Jonze co-founded Directors Label, with filmmakers Chris Cunningham and Michel Gondry, and the Palm Pictures company. He is currently the creative director of Vice Media, Inc. and its multinational television channel Vice TV.

== Early life and education ==
Adam Spiegel was born on October 22, 1969, in New York City, the son of Arthur H. Spiegel III and Sandra L. Granzow. His father was of German Jewish ancestry. Jonze is the great-grandson of Arthur Spiegel and the great-great-grandson of Joseph Spiegel, founder of the Spiegel catalog. Arthur H. Spiegel III was the founder of a healthcare consulting firm. Jonze's parents divorced when he was a young child and his father remarried. Jonze was raised by his mother in Bethesda, Maryland, where she worked in public relations, along with his brother Sam "Squeak E. Clean" Spiegel, who is now a producer and DJ, and his sister Julia. While studying at Walt Whitman High School, Jonze spent much of his time at a Bethesda community store, where owner Mike Henderson gave him the nickname "Spike Jonze" in reference to the satirical bandleader Spike Jones. While in high school, Jonze was close friends with future Jackass co-creator Jeff Tremaine. They became friends through their shared interest in BMX.

A keen BMX rider, Jonze began working at the Rockville BMX store in Rockville, Maryland, at the age of 16. A common destination for touring professional BMX teams, Jonze began photographing BMX demos at Rockville and formed a friendship with Freestylin' Magazine editors Mark Lewman and Andy Jenkins. Impressed with Jonze's photography work, the pair offered him a job as a photographer for the magazine, and he subsequently moved to California to pursue career opportunities in photography. Jonze fronted Club Homeboy, an international BMX club, alongside Lewman and Jenkins. The three also created the youth culture magazines Homeboy and Dirt, the latter of which was spun off from the female-centered Sassy and was aimed towards young boys.

== Career ==
=== 1985–1993: Photography, magazines, and early video work ===
While shooting for various BMX publications in California, Jonze was introduced to a number of professional skateboarders who often shared ramps with BMX pros. Jonze formed a close friendship with Mark Gonzales, co-owner of the newly formed Blind Skateboards at the time, and began shooting photos with the young Blind team including Jason Lee, Guy Mariano and Rudy Johnson in the late 1980s. Jonze became a regular contributor to Transworld Skateboarding and was subsequently given a job at World Industries by Steve Rocco, who enlisted him to photograph advertisements and shoot promotional videos for his brands under the World Industries umbrella. Jonze filmed, edited and produced his first skateboarding video, Rubbish Heap, for World Industries in 1989. His following video project was Video Days, a promotional video for Blind Skateboards, which was released in 1991 and is considered to be highly influential in the community. The video's subject, Gonzales, presented a copy of Video Days to Kim Gordon during a chance encounter following a Sonic Youth show in early 1992. Impressed with Jonze's videography skills, Gordon asked him to direct a music video featuring skateboarders. The video, co-directed by Jonze and Tamra Davis, was for their 1992 single "100%", which featured skateboarding footage of Blind Skateboards rider Jason Lee, who later became a successful actor. In 1993, Jonze co-directed the "trippy" music video for The Breeders song "Cannonball" with Gordon.

Along with Rick Howard, Mike Carroll and Megan Baltimore, Jonze co-founded the skateboard company Girl Skateboards in 1993. The following year, he directed the video for the Weezer song "Buddy Holly", which featured the band performing the song interspersed with clips from the sitcom Happy Days. The video became immensely popular and was shown frequently on MTV. A 2013 Rolling Stone readers' poll ranked it as the tenth best music video of the 1990s. Also in 1994, Jonze directed the videos for the Beastie Boys' songs "Sure Shot" and, more famously, "Sabotage". The latter parodies 1970s cop shows and is presented as the opening credits for a fictional show called Sabotage, featuring the band members appearing as its protagonists. As with "Buddy Holly", the video attracted great popularity and was in "near-constant rotation on MTV." In the same year, Jonze also directed videos for the hip hop group Marxman, The Breeders, Dinosaur Jr., and another Weezer song, "Undone – The Sweater Song". Jonze made his film debut as an actor in a bit part in the drama Mi Vida Loca (1994). In 1995, he was attached to direct an adaptation of Harold and the Purple Crayon.

=== 1995–1999: In demand video director and Being John Malkovich ===
Jonze collaborated with Björk for the video for her 1995 single "It's Oh So Quiet", a cover of a 1951 Betty Hutton song. The video is set in an auto shop and sees Björk dancing and singing to the song in the style of a musical, inspired by Jacques Demy's The Umbrellas of Cherbourg. In the same year, he also directed a television commercial titled "Guerrilla Tennis" for Nike featuring tennis players Andre Agassi and Pete Sampras participating in a match in the middle of an intersection in Manhattan, the "rapid-paced" title sequence for the sitcom Double Rush and worked on videos for R.E.M., Sonic Youth and Ween. Jonze sole video directing credit of 1996 was for The Pharcyde's "Drop", which was filmed backwards and then reversed. In 1997, Jonze made a short film called How They Get There, starring Mark Gonzales as a man who is playfully imitating a woman's actions on the other side of a sidewalk before running into danger. Jonze worked with the electronic music duo Daft Punk on the music video for the instrumental song "Da Funk" in 1997. The clip, titled Big City Nights, follows an anthropomorphic "man-dog" wandering the streets of New York City. His video for the Chemical Brothers's "Elektrobank" (1997) starred his future wife Sofia Coppola as a gymnast. Throughout 1997, he also worked on videos for R.E.M., Pavement, Puff Daddy, and The Notorious B.I.G. He made a cameo appearance as a paramedic in David Fincher's film The Game (1997).

Jonze filmed a short documentary in 1997, Amarillo by Morning, about two Texan boys who aspire to be bull riders. He was also one of the cinematographers for the documentary Free Tibet, which documents the 1996 Tibetan Freedom Concert in San Francisco. His 1998 commercial for Sprite is considered an example of subvertising for its spoof take on the brand's mascot. Jonze developed an alter ego named Richard Koufey, the leader of the Torrance Community Dance Group, an urban troupe that performs in public spaces. The Koufey persona appeared when Jonze, in character, filmed himself dancing to Fatboy Slim's "The Rockafeller Skank" as it played on a boom box in a public area. Jonze showed the video to Slim, who liked it but it could not be used as rights for passer-by were not obtained. Slim/Cook subsequently asked him to direct another video. Jonze then assembled a group of dancers to perform to Slim's "Praise You" outside a Westwood, California, movie theater and taped the performance; Cook appears briefly in the video. The resulting clip was a huge success, and "Koufey" and his troupe were invited to New York City to perform the song for the 1999 MTV Video Music Awards. The video received awards for Best Direction, Breakthrough, and Best Choreography, which Jonze accepted, still in character. Jonze made a short mockumentary about the experience called Torrance Rises (1999).

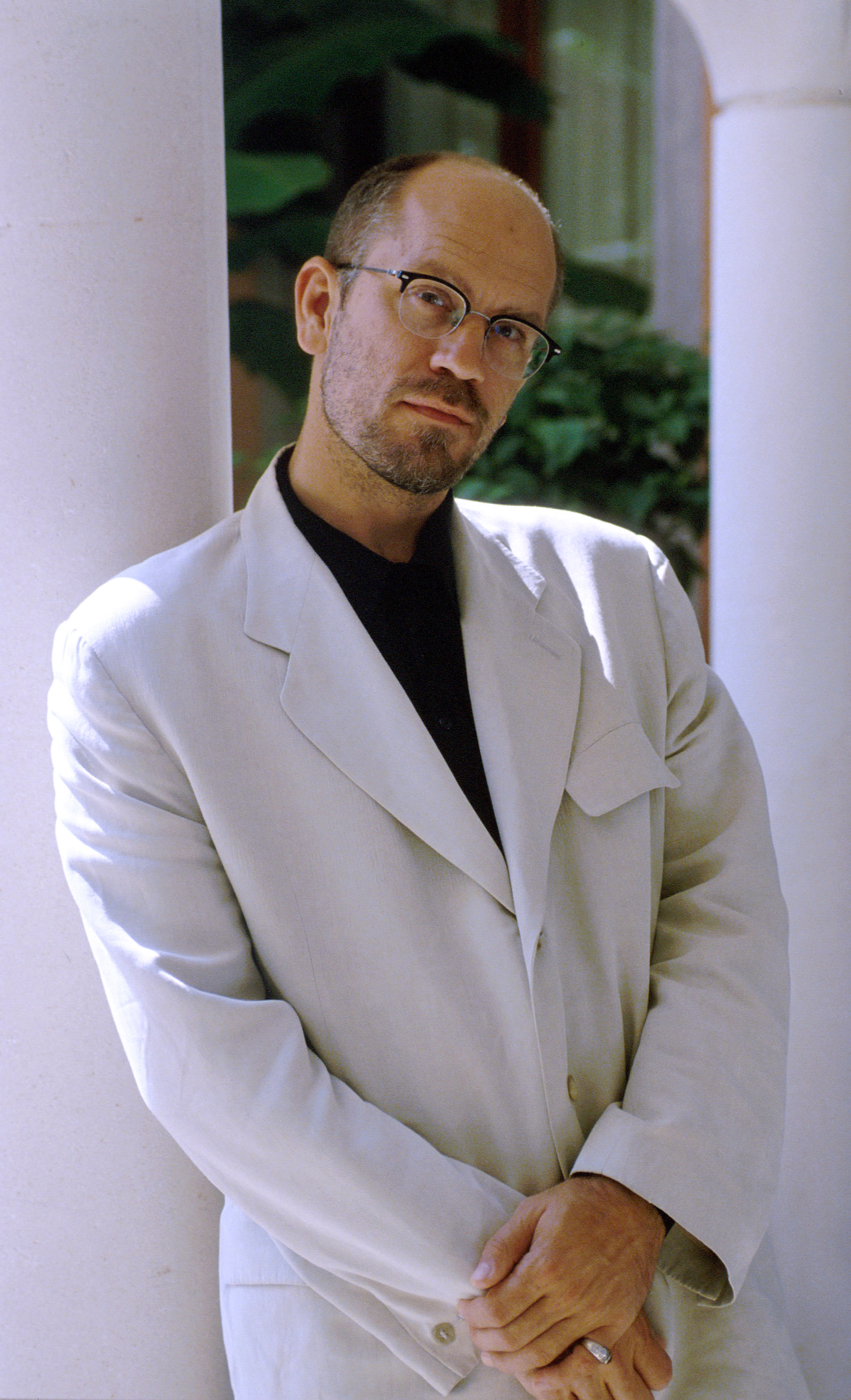
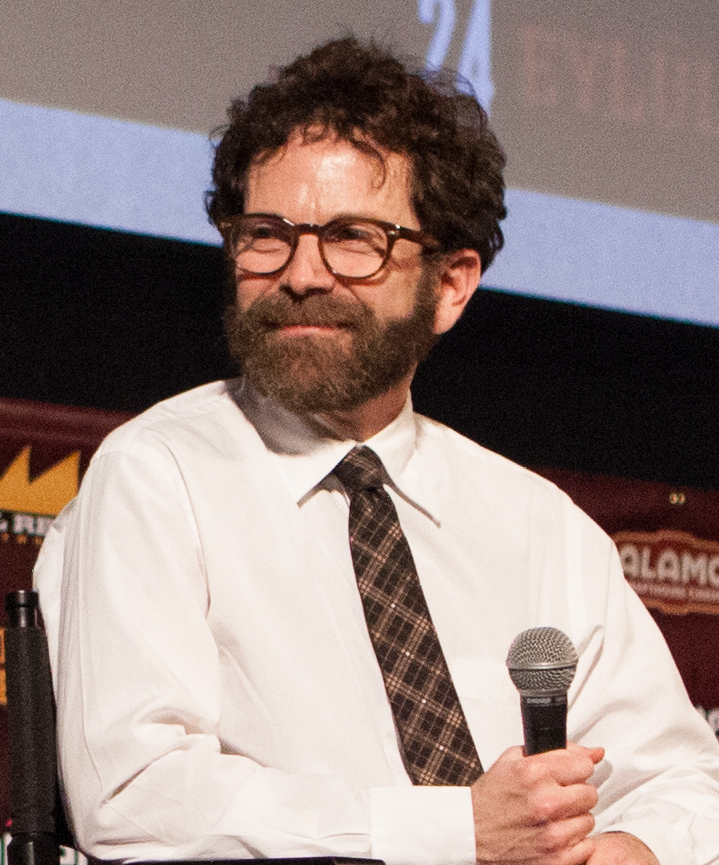
John Malkovich (left), star and subject of Being John Malkovich, and the film's writer Charlie Kaufman.

The first feature film Jonze directed was Being John Malkovich in 1999. It stars John Cusack, Cameron Diaz, and Catherine Keener, with John Malkovich as himself. The screenplay was written by Charlie Kaufman and follows a puppeteer who finds a portal in an office that leads to the mind of actor John Malkovich. Kaufman's script was passed on to Jonze by his father-in-law Francis Ford Coppola and he agreed to direct it, "delighted by its originality and labyrinthine plot". Being John Malkovich was released in October 1999 to laudatory reviews; the Chicago Sun-Times critic Roger Ebert found the film to be "endlessly inventive" and named it the best film of 1999, while Owen Gleiberman of Entertainment Weekly called it the "most excitingly original movie of the year". At the 72nd Academy Awards, the film was nominated for Best Director, Best Original Screenplay and Best Supporting Actress for Keener. Jonze co-starred opposite George Clooney, Mark Wahlberg and Ice Cube in David O. Russell's war comedy Three Kings (1999), which depicts a gold heist by four U.S. soldiers following the end of the Gulf War. Jonze's role in the film, the sweet, dimwitted, casually racist PFC Conrad Vig, was written specifically for him. Jonze also directed a commercial for Nike called "The Morning After" in 1999, a parody of the hysteria surrounding Y2K.

=== 2000–2008: Adaptation and Jackass ===
Jonze returned to video directing in 2000, helming the video for the song "Wonderboy" by the comedy duo Tenacious D. Along with Johnny Knoxville and childhood friend Jeff Tremaine, Jonze co-created, executive produced and occasionally appeared in the television series Jackass in 2000, which aired on MTV for three seasons until 2002. The show featured a group of people performing dangerous stunts and pranks on each other. At the request of Al Gore's presidential campaign in 2000, Jonze directed a short video about Gore at his home. The video was shown at the Democratic National Convention. He collaborated with Fatboy Slim for a second time in 2001, directing the video for "Weapon of Choice", starring Christopher Walken dancing around a deserted hotel lobby. The video won multiple awards at the 2001 MTV Video Music Awards and the 2002 Grammy Award for Best Music Video. Jonze's second film, the comedy-drama Adaptation, (2002), was partially based on the non-fiction book The Orchid Thief by Susan Orlean and was written by Charlie Kaufman. The metafilm starred Nicolas Cage in a dual role as Kaufman and his fictional twin brother, Donald, as he attempts to adapt The Orchid Thief into a film and features dramatized events from the book. It co-starred Meryl Streep as Orlean and Chris Cooper as the subject of The Orchid Thief, John Laroche. Adaptation. was met with widespread critical acclaim from critics, who praised it for its originality whilst simultaneously being funny and thought-provoking.

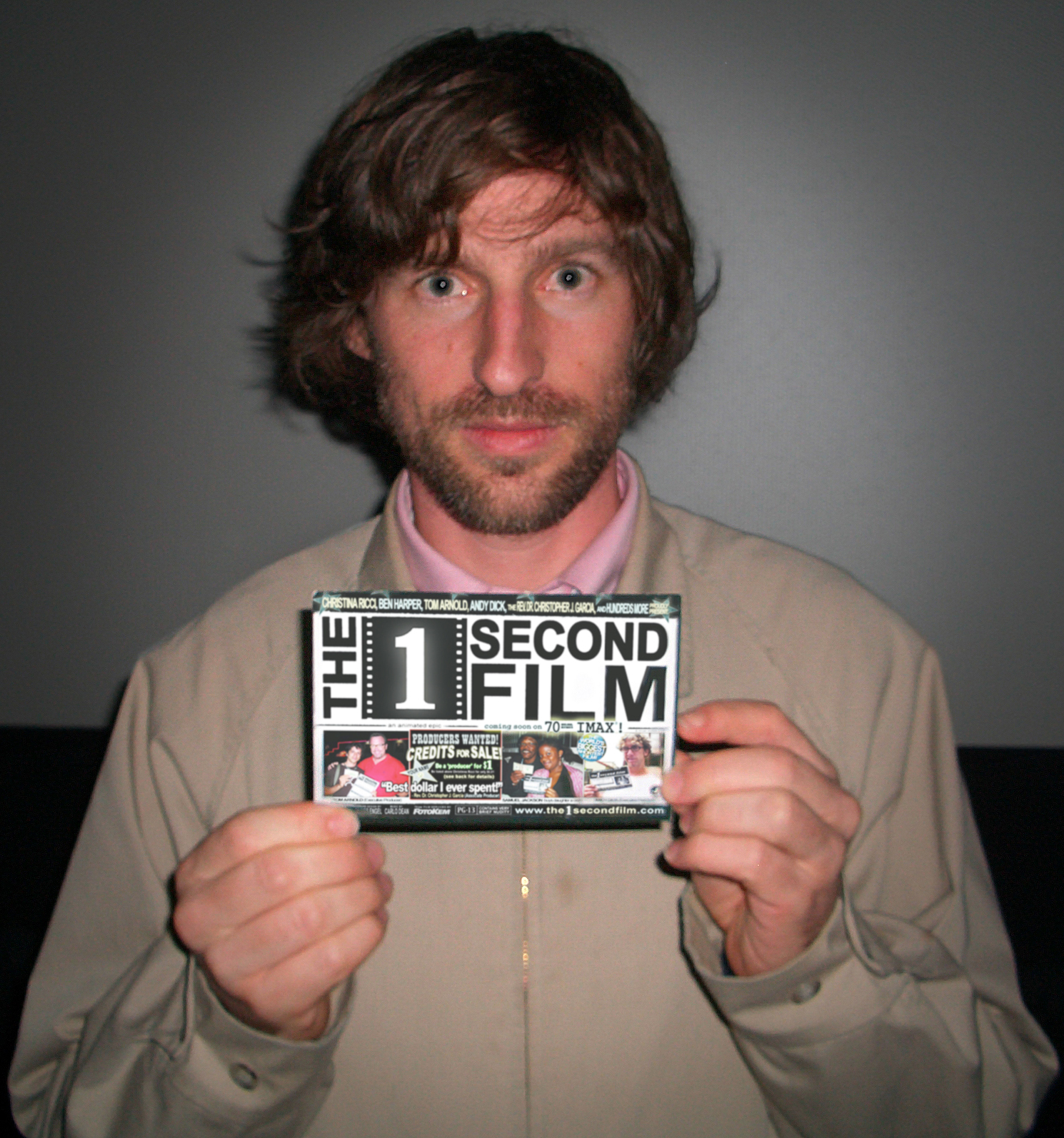
Jonze holding a producer credit for The 1 Second Film in 2004

Jackass: The Movie, a continuation of the television show, was released in October 2002. Jonze co-produced, contributed to the writing of the segments, and made a cameo appearance in the film. Jonze directed a 60-second commercial called "Lamp" for the furniture store IKEA in 2002, which won the Grand Prix at the Cannes Lions International Advertising Festival, considered a prestigious award in the field of advertising. Also in 2002, Jonze directed the Levi's commercial "Crazy Legs" and the videos for Beck's "Guess I'm Doing Fine", Björk's "It's in Our Hands" (filmed in night vision), and one of two versions of Weezer's "Island in the Sun". Jonze co-directed the Girl Skateboards video Yeah Right! in 2003, which featured extensive use of special effects and a cameo by Owen Wilson. That same year, he directed the video for Turbonegro's single "Sell Your Body (to the Night)" which featured appearances by the members of Jackass.

Jonze co-founded Directors Label – a series of DVDs devoted to music video directors – in September 2003 with filmmakers Chris Cunningham and Michel Gondry. Jonze's volume, The Work of Director Spike Jonze, was released in October and comprises his videos, as well as photographs, drawings and interviews. Jonze made a faux documentary called The Mystery of Dalarö in 2004 as part of an advertising campaign for the Volvo S40. The film was credited to a fictional Venezuelan director named Carlos Soto, but was later revealed to have been directed by Jonze. He directed a commercial for Adidas titled "Hello Tomorrow" in 2005, featuring the music of his brother Sam "Squeak E. Clean" Spiegel and Jonze's then-girlfriend Karen O of the band Yeah Yeah Yeahs.

After directing videos for Ludacris and Yeah Yeah Yeahs' "Y Control" (which caused some controversy over its graphic images), Jonze collaborated with Björk for a third time on the playful music video for "Triumph of a Heart" (2005), in which her husband was played by a housecat. The second Jackass film, Jackass Number Two, was released in 2006 and saw Jonze dress as an old lady whose breasts "accidentally" keep becoming exposed while wandering around Los Angeles. Along with Dave Eggers, he had a speaking part in the Beck song "The Horrible Fanfare/Landslide/Exoskeleton" from his 2006 album The Information. In 2007, he became the creative director of VBS.tv, an online television network supplied by Vice and funded by MTV. Jonze hosted his own interview show on the service. He directed ads for GAP and Levi's, and co-directed the skateboarding video Fully Flared with Ty Evans and Cory Weincheque in the same year. Jonze directed the music video for Kanye West's single "Flashing Lights" in 2008. Filmed entirely in slow motion, the video stars West and model Rita G, and sees her driving around the Las Vegas, Nevada, desert in a Ford Mustang before stopping to repeatedly stab West, who is tied up in the trunk. Jonze produced Charlie Kaufman's directorial debut Synecdoche, New York in 2008, which Jonze originally intended to direct.

=== 2009–2019: Where the Wild Things Are, short films, and Her ===
Where the Wild Things Are (2009), a film adaptation of Maurice Sendak children's picture book of the same name, was directed by Jonze and co-written by Jonze and Dave Eggers, who expanded the original ten-sentence book into a feature film. Sendak gave advice to Jonze while he was adapting the book and the two developed a friendship. The film stars Max Records as Max, a misunderstood 8-year-old boy who runs away from home after a fight with his mother (played by Catherine Keener) and goes away to an island inhabited by creatures known as the "Wild Things," who declare Max their king. The Wild Things were played by performers in creature suits, while CG was required to animate their faces. James Gandolfini, Lauren Ambrose, Chris Cooper, Forest Whitaker, Catherine O'Hara, Paul Dano, and Michael Berry Jr. provided the voices for the Wild Things, and Jonze voiced two owls named Bob and Terry. The film's soundtrack was composed by Karen O and composer Carter Burwell scored his third film for Jonze. Where the Wild Things Are was released in October 2009 to a generally positive critical reception but did not perform well at the box office. Some reviewers were unsure whether the film was intended for a younger or adult audience due to its dark tone and level of maturity. Jonze himself said that he "didn't set out to make a children's movie; I set out to make a movie about childhood". A television documentary, Tell Them Anything You Want: A Portrait of Maurice Sendak, co-directed by Jonze and Lance Bangs, aired in 2009 and features a series of interviews with Sendak. Jonze wrote and directed We Were Once a Fairytale (2009), a short film starring Kanye West as himself acting belligerently while drunk in a nightclub.

Jonze wrote and directed the science fiction romance short film I'm Here in 2010, based on the children's book The Giving Tree. The film stars Andrew Garfield as a robot with a head shaped like an old PC who falls in love with a more sleekly-designed female robot, played by Sienna Guillory. Jonze produced and provided his voice to a character in the short film Higglety Pigglety Pop! or There Must Be More to Life (2010), based on Maurice Sendak's book of the same name. He co-directed the video for LCD Soundsystem's "Drunk Girls" with the band's frontman James Murphy and directed the video for Arcade Fire's "The Suburbs" in 2010, the latter being an edited version of Jonze's short film Scenes from the Suburbs (2011), a dystopian vision of suburbia in the near-future and an expansion of the themes of nostalgia, alienation, and childhood found in the song. A third Jackass film, Jackass 3D, premiered in 2010. He was part of the main cast for the black comedy series The Increasingly Poor Decisions of Todd Margaret as the supervisor to David Cross' character for the first two seasons in 2010 and 2012, before being replaced by Jack McBrayer in the third season. Jonze resumed his longtime collaboration with the Beastie Boys in July 2011, directing the video for their song featuring Santigold, "Don't Play No Game That I Can't Win", in which the band members are portrayed as action figures. He then directed the video for Kanye West and Jay-Z's 2011 single "Otis", which saw the pair driving a customized Maybach 57 around an industrial lot. Along with Simon Cahn, Jonze co-directed the stop-motion animated short film Mourir Auprès De Toi (2011), which is set in the Shakespeare and Company bookstore in Paris. Jonze voiced a skeletal Macbeth in the film. Also in 2011, Jonze played a small supporting role in the sports drama Moneyball as the husband of Robin Wright's character, who is the ex-wife of Billy Beane (played by Brad Pitt). In 2012, Jonze co-directed the feature-length skateboarding film Pretty Sweet with his Fully Flared co-directors Ty Evans and Cory Weincheque.

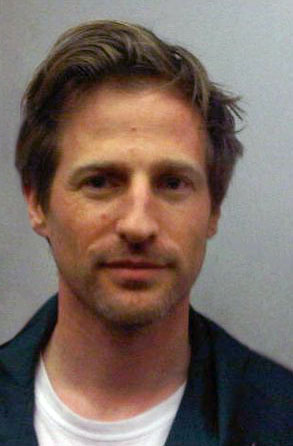
Jonze in 2013

Jonze's fourth feature film, the romantic science fiction drama Her, was released in December 2013. The film was his first original screenplay and the first he had written alone, inspired by Charlie Kaufman by putting "all the ideas and feelings at that time" into his script for Synecdoche, New York. It stars Joaquin Phoenix, Amy Adams, Rooney Mara, Olivia Wilde, and Scarlett Johansson. The film follows the recently divorced Theodore Twombly (Phoenix), a man who develops a relationship with a seemingly intuitive and humanistic female voice, named "Samantha" (Johansson), produced by an advanced computer operating system. Samantha was originally voiced by Samantha Morton during its production, but was later replaced by Johansson. Jonze provided his voice to a video game character in the film, Alien Child, who interacts with Theodore. The film's score was composed by Arcade Fire and Owen Pallett.

Her was met with universal acclaim from critics. Todd McCarthy of The Hollywood Reporter praised Jonze for taking an old theme "the search for love and the need to 'only connect'" and embracing it "in a speculative way that feels very pertinent to the moment and captures the emotional malaise of a future just an intriguing step or two ahead of contemporary reality." Scott Foundas of Variety opined that it was Jonze's "richest and most emotionally mature work to date". At the 86th Academy Awards, Jonze was nominated for three Academy Awards for Her, winning for Best Original Screenplay and receiving further nominations for Best Picture and Best Original Song for co-writing "The Moon Song" with Karen O. Jonze won the Golden Globe Award for Best Screenplay at the 71st Golden Globe Awards.

Jonze co-wrote, co-produced, and appeared in Jackass Presents: Bad Grandpa (2013), a hidden camera comedy film starring Johnny Knoxville as the vulgar grandfather Irvin Zisman. Jonze played his wife Gloria, but was cut from a majority of the film. Jonze served as the creative director of the YouTube Music Awards on November 3, 2013. At the ceremony, he directed the live music video for Arcade Fire's "Afterlife", documented Lady Gaga's live performance of "Dope" with Chris Milk, and premiered a short film written by Lena Dunham that Jonze directed called Choose You. Jonze had a small role in Martin Scorsese's 2013 film The Wolf of Wall Street as a stockbroker who teaches Jordan Belfort (played by Leonardo DiCaprio) the ins and outs of penny stocks. Jonze got the part as the film shared the same casting director as Her, who asked Jonze if he wanted to appear in the film. He directed the video for Kanye West's "Only One" in 2015, which was filmed on his iPhone in a foggy field and featured heartfelt interactions between West and daughter. Jonze made a guest appearance in the fourth season of Lena Dunham's television series Girls in March 2015. Jonze directed the short commercial film Kenzo World to promote a fragrance by Kenzo in 2016. The film starred Margaret Qualley as a woman erratically dancing around a large mansion, with choreography by Ryan Heffington. Jonze is the creative director of multinational television channel brand Viceland, which launched in February 2016.

In 2017, Jonze directed Frank Ocean's summer festival tour, which included 8 shows which took place in different cities around the US and Europe. Jonze also produced and decorated, alongside Ocean and artist Tom Sachs among others, an elaborate stage with a runway and central platform for the same concert. Jonze wrote and directed the stage show Changers: A Dance Story, starring Lakeith Stanfield and Mia Wasikowska. Featuring dance choreography by Ryan Heffington, the show premiered at an Opening Ceremony fashion week presentation in September 2017 before opening to the public for a four-night run at the La MaMa Experimental Theatre Club. Jonze produced the documentary Jim & Andy: The Great Beyond (2017), which documents the production of the film Man on the Moon (1999). The following year, he directed the short commercial film Welcome Home for Apple's HomePod devices, starring FKA Twigs dancing inside her apartment as its transforms into a surreal space and engages in a dance off with her doppelgänger. In 2019, Jonze directed a commercial and accompanying short film for the website building service Squarespace starring Idris Elba, as well a short film titled The New Normal advocating for marijuana legalization in partnership with the cannabis company MedMen. In that year, Jonze also filmed the Aziz Ansari stand-up special Right Now, operating close-up shots himself onstage. He won two consecutive Directors Guild of America Awards for his commercial work in 2018 and 2019.

=== 2020–present: Beastie Boys Story ===
Jonze directed the Beastie Boys Story: As Told by Michael Diamond & Adam Horovitz stage show, which took place in Philadelphia and Brooklyn for three nights in 2019 and saw the band's two surviving members tell the story of the Beastie Boys and their friendship. A feature-length documentary, Beastie Boys Story, was also directed by Jonze and features footage from the shows. It was released on Apple TV+ in 2020 to positive reviews. He returned to acting in Damien Chazelle's 2022 film Babylon, appearing as a German film director bearing a resemblance to Erich von Stroheim. In early 2023, it was reported that Jonze had started working on a television series for Netflix with Brad Pitt and Joaquin Phoenix attached. However, the project was scrapped after he left it in October 2024.

== Personal life ==
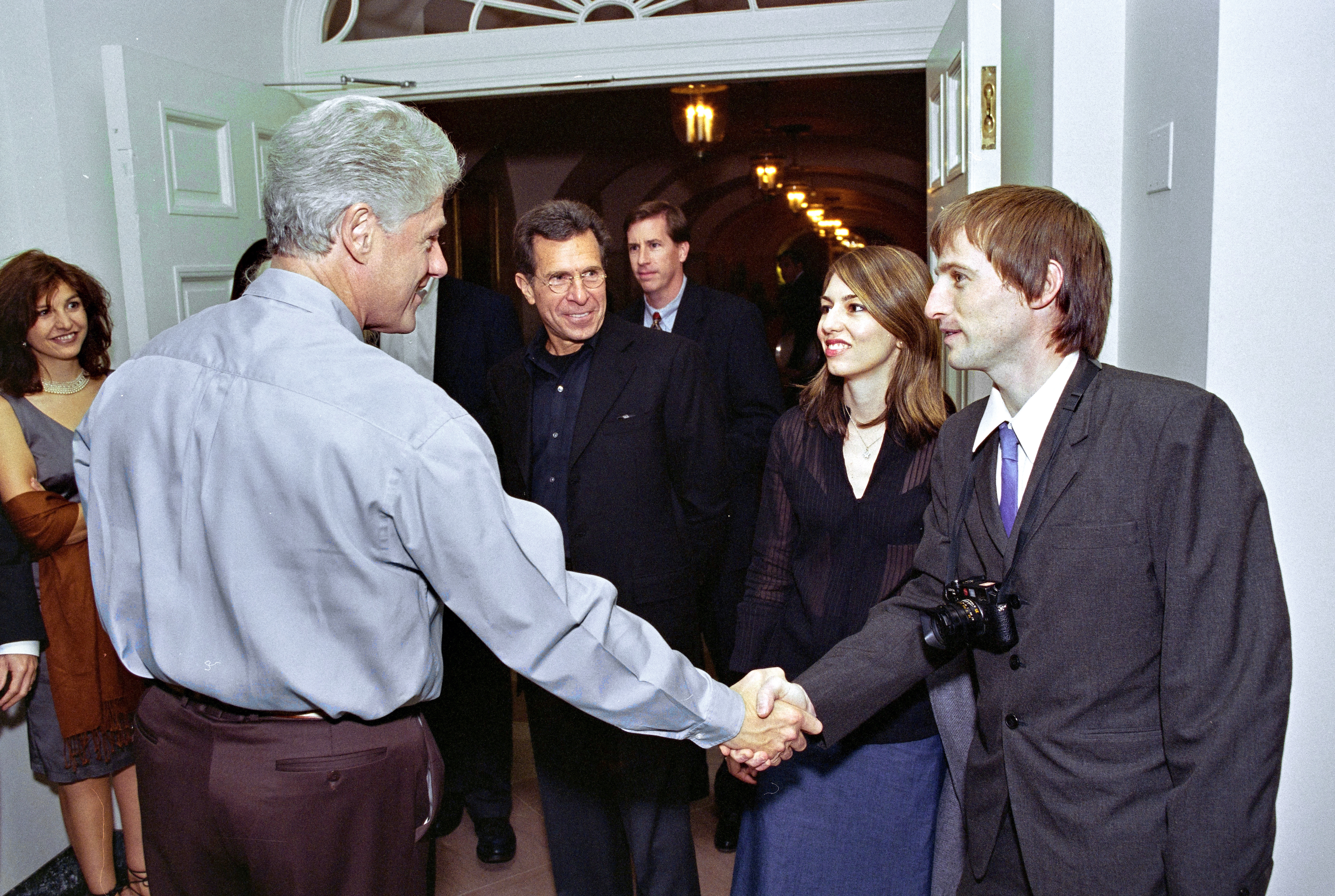
(left to right) President Bill Clinton, Paul Junger Witt, Sofia Coppola, and Jonze at Three Kings screening on October 14, 1999.

On June 26, 1999, Jonze married director Sofia Coppola, whom he had first met in 1992 on the set of the music video for Sonic Youth's "100%". On December 5, 2003, the couple filed for divorce, citing "irreconcilable differences". The character of John, a career-driven photographer (played by Giovanni Ribisi) in Coppola's Lost in Translation (2003), was rumored to be based on Jonze, though Coppola commented "It's not Spike, but there are elements of him there, elements of experiences."

Jonze dated singer Karen O throughout 2005. People reported that Jonze dated actress Drew Barrymore in 2007. From 2008 to 2009, Jonze dated actress Michelle Williams, with whom he worked on Synecdoche, New York. Jonze was reported to have begun dating Japanese actress Rinko Kikuchi in 2010 and the couple briefly lived together in New York City before separating in 2011.

Beginning in 2019, Jonze was in a relationship with artist Allie Teilz, whom he met in 2013 on the set of Her. They have three sons: twins born in 2023 and another in 2024.

== Filmography ==
Directed features
| Year | Title | Distribution |
|---|---|---|
| 1999 | Being John Malkovich | USA Films / Universal Pictures |
| 2002 | Adaptation | Sony Pictures Releasing |
| 2009 | Where the Wild Things Are | Warner Bros. Pictures |
| 2013 | Her | Warner Bros. Pictures |

== Awards and nominations ==
Accolades for Spike Jonze
| Year | Title | Academy Awards | | BAFTA Awards | | Golden Globe Awards | |
| Year | Title | Nominations | Wins | Nominations | Wins | Nominations | Wins |
|---|---|---|---|---|---|---|---|
| 1999 | Being John Malkovich | 3 | | 3 | 1 | 4 | |
| 2002 | Adaptation | 4 | 1 | 4 | 1 | 6 | 2 |
| 2009 | Where the Wild Things Are | | | | | 1 | |
| 2013 | Her | 5 | 1 | | | 3 | 1 |
| Total | | 12 | 2 | 7 | 2 | 14 | 3 |

Directed Academy Award performances
Under Jonze's direction, these actors have received Academy Award nominations (and one win) for their performances in their respective roles.

| Year | Performer | Film | Result |
Academy Award for Best Actor
| 2002 | Nicolas Cage | Adaptation | Nominated |
Academy Award for Best Supporting Actor
| 2002 | Chris Cooper | Adaptation | Won |
Academy Award for Best Supporting Actress
| 1999 | Catherine Keener | Being John Malkovich | Nominated |
| 2002 | Meryl Streep | Adaptation | Nominated |

== See also ==
- List of oldest and youngest Academy Award winners and nominees — Youngest nominees for Best Director
