= Being John Malkovich =

1999 film

- Theatrical release poster
- Directed by: Spike Jonze
- Written by: Charlie Kaufman
- Produced by: Michael Stipe; Sandy Stern; Steve Golin; Vincent Landay
- Starring: John Cusack; Cameron Diaz; Catherine Keener; Orson Bean; Mary Kay Place; John Malkovich
- Cinematography: Lance Acord
- Edited by: Eric Zumbrunnen
- Music by: Carter Burwell
- Production companies: Gramercy Pictures; Propaganda Films; Single Cell Pictures
- Distributed by: USA Films (United States); Universal Pictures International (International)
- Release dates: September 2, 1999 (Venice); October 29, 1999 (United States)
- Running time: 113 minutes
- Country: United States
- Language: English
- Budget: $13 million
- Box office: $23.1 million

Being John Malkovich is a 1999 American surrealist fantasy comedy drama film directed by Spike Jonze and written by Charlie Kaufman, both making their feature film debut. The film stars John Cusack, Cameron Diaz, and Catherine Keener, with John Malkovich as a fictionalized version of himself. Cusack plays a puppeteer who finds a portal that leads into Malkovich's mind.

Released by USA Films, the film received widespread acclaim, with praise for its writing and direction, and grossed $23 million against a $13 million budget. The film was nominated in three categories at the 72nd Academy Awards: Best Director, Best Original Screenplay, and Best Supporting Actress for Keener. The film ranked 441st on Empire magazine's 2008 list of the 500 greatest films of all time, while Malkovich's performance is ranked number 90 on Premiere's "100 Greatest Movie Characters of All Time".

== Plot ==
Craig Schwartz is an unemployed puppeteer in New York City, in a forlorn marriage with his pet-obsessed wife, Lotte. He finds work as a file clerk for the eccentric Dr. Lester in the Mertin-Flemmer building, on a floor between the 7th and 8th, where the ceiling is very low. He develops an attraction to co-worker Maxine Lund, who does not return his affections. While filing, Craig discovers a small hidden door. He crawls through it into an earthen tunnel and finds himself inside the mind of actor John Malkovich. After fifteen minutes, Craig is ejected, landing on the side of the New Jersey Turnpike. He tells Maxine about the door, and she realizes they can sell the experience for profit.

Lotte enters the portal, and, based on her experience being Malkovich, becomes fascinated with the idea of becoming a man. She and Craig visit Dr. Lester's home, where Lotte finds a room filled with Malkovich memorabilia. Maxine arranges a date with Malkovich while he is inhabited by Lotte. Lotte becomes smitten with Maxine, who reciprocates, but only when Lotte is inside Malkovich; Maxine manipulates him into having sex with her while Lotte is in his mind. Craig, forsaken by both women, locks Lotte in a cage and forces her to set up another tryst with Maxine. He inhabits Malkovich instead, and discovers that his puppeteering skills allow him some control over Malkovich's body.

The real Malkovich, disturbed by his loss of control, confides in his friend Charlie Sheen and becomes suspicious of Maxine. Malkovich follows her to the Mertin-Flemmer building, where she and Craig are charging customers to use the portal. After a heated argument with Craig, Malkovich enters the portal and finds himself in a world where everyone looks like him and only says "Malkovich". After he is ejected, Malkovich demands that Craig close the portal, but Craig refuses. Lotte is freed by her pet chimpanzee and warns Maxine that Craig is inhabiting Malkovich, but Maxine is attracted to Craig's ability to control him.

Lotte confronts Dr. Lester, who reveals that he is in fact Captain Mertin, who, having discovered the portal to a "vessel body" in the late 1800s, erected the Mertin-Flemmer building to conceal it. He has obtained immortality by moving from one body to the next, which becomes "ripe" on the host's 44th birthday, allowing him to take possession. If he is late, he would become trapped in a newborn body. Lester has invited a group of friends to join him in occupying Malkovich once he turns 44, and Lotte warns them that Craig has taken control. Craig discovers he can occupy Malkovich indefinitely. Inhabiting him over the next eight months, he makes Malkovich into a world-class puppeteer and marries Maxine, who is pregnant.

On Malkovich's 44th birthday, Lester and Lotte kidnap Maxine. They call to demand that Craig leave Malkovich, threatening to kill Maxine, but he hangs up. In desperation, Lotte decides to shoot Maxine, who escapes into the portal. Lotte pursues her through Malkovich's subconscious before they are both ejected. Maxine confesses that she kept her unborn child because it was conceived while Lotte was in Malkovich's mind, meaning that it is Lotte's child, too, and the women cement their love for each other. Craig, believing Maxine is still in danger, leaves Malkovich's mind, allowing Lester and his friends to enter. Discovering that Maxine has discarded him for Lotte, Craig swears to reenter the portal to take back Malkovich's mind.

Seven years later, an older Malkovich, now inhabited by multiple people, tells Sheen about Lester and his friends' plan to extend their lives via the portal, which now leads to the mind of Maxine's daughter, Emily. Meanwhile, Craig, having entered the portal too late to enter Malkovich, but too early to have any control over Emily, is permanently trapped inside her, forced to watch Lotte and Maxine live happily together.

== Cast ==
- John Cusack as Craig Schwartz
- Cameron Diaz as Lotte Schwartz
- Catherine Keener as Maxine Lund
- John Malkovich as John Horatio Malkovich
- Ned Bellamy as Derek Mantini
- Orson Bean as Dr. Lester
- Mary Kay Place as Floris
- Charlie Sheen as himself
- W. Earl Brown as First J.M. Inc. Customer
- Carlos Jacott as Larry the Agent
- Byrne Piven as Captain James Mertin
- Octavia L. Spencer as Woman in Elevator
- James Murray as Student Puppeteer

=== Cameo appearances ===
Director Spike Jonze makes a cameo appearance as Derek Mantini's assistant; Mantini is billed in the story as the greatest puppeteer in the history of the world and arouses Craig's envy. Brad Pitt also has a brief cameo, as a miffed star in the documentary on Malkovich's career, who seems to be on the verge of saying something before the shot ends. Sean Penn appears as himself, a fan of Malkovich's puppeteer work. Film director David Fincher makes an uncredited appearance as Christopher Bing in the American Arts & Culture pseudo-documentary on John Malkovich. Winona Ryder, Andy Dick, and the members of Hanson can be seen in the audience of a Malkovich puppet show.

== Production ==
=== Development ===
Writer Charlie Kaufman's idea of Being John Malkovich originated simply as "a story about a man who falls in love with someone who is not his wife." Gradually he added further elements to the story which he found entertaining, such as floor 7 1/2 of the Mertin Flemmer building; among his first ideas, Malkovich was "nowhere to be seen". He wrote the script on spec in 1994 and though it was widely read by production company and film studio executives, all turned it down. Hoping to find a producer, Kaufman sent the script to Francis Ford Coppola, who passed it on to his daughter Sofia's then-boyfriend Spike Jonze.

Jonze first read the script in 1996 and had agreed to direct the film by 1997. Jonze took the script to Propaganda Films, which agreed to produce the film in partnership with production company Single Cell Pictures. Single Cell producers Michael Stipe and Sandy Stern pitched the film to numerous studios, including New Line Cinema, who dropped the project after chairman Robert Shaye asked, "Why the fuck can't it be Being Tom Cruise?" Jonze recalled that Malkovich asked the same question, and that Malkovich had felt that "Either the movie's a bomb and it's got not only my name above the title but my name in the title, so I'm fucked that way; or it does well and I'm just forever associated with this character." Jonze explained in the same interview that he had not realized how brave Malkovich's performance was.

With a budget of $10 million, principal photography of Being John Malkovich began on July 20, 1998, and continued through August. Filming took place primarily in Los Angeles; specific locations included the University of Southern California campus and the Observation Bar on board the RMS Queen Mary.

The puppets were created by Kamela Portuges-Robbins and Images in Motion. Phillip Huber animated the puppets. About Huber's puppetry, Jonze has said he was a full-time puppeteer and controlled his puppets with impressive means, such as using strings and no rods to control them, as well as swinging the puppets on high wires.

=== Casting ===
Diaz's make-up artist Gucci Westman described styling Diaz in the role as "a challenge, to make her look homely." The script included minimal physical descriptions of characters, and thus when Diaz took up the role she did not know that "people weren't going to recognize me." Cusack read the film's script after he had asked his agent to present him with the "craziest, most unproduceable script you can find". Impressed with the script, he asked his agent to follow its progress and book him an audition, which won him the role.

Keener cited Being John Malkovich as an instance of her taking up a role based on the director's previous work. She had heard about Jonze's experience with music videos and took up the part of Maxine although she initially disliked the character and did not feel that she was right for the part. She was subsequently nominated for an Oscar.

Kaufman said that there was never another actor in Malkovich's place in the script: "The screenplay was always 'Being John Malkovich', even before I had any expectation that John Malkovich would even read the script." He chose Malkovich because he believed there to be "an enigmatic quality about him that works", though Malkovich was partly chosen because of the sound of his name in repetition. Kaufman explained that "When we were thinking of alternatives, we found that a lot of them weren't fun to say." Jonze's then-father-in-law Francis Ford Coppola was able to contact Malkovich, and Jonze flew with producer Sandy Stern to Malkovich's home in France. Stern said that Malkovich was "half intrigued and half horrified" when he first read the script, but he eventually agreed to star in the film.

== Soundtrack ==
Being John Malkovich: Original Motion Picture Soundtrack

Soundtrack album by Various artists
- Released: 1999
- Genre: Soundtrack
- Label: Astralwerks
- Producer: Various

Professional ratings
Review scores
Source	Rating
Allmusic	4.5/5 stars

All tracks are written by Carter Burwell, except where noted.

Track listing
No.	Title	Length
1.	"Amphibian" (Mark Bell Mix, written by Björk)	2:47
2.	"Malkovich Masterpiece Remix" (Written by Spike Jonze, performed by John Malkovich)	2:22
3.	"Puppet Love"	2:02
4.	"Momentary Introspection"	1:07
5.	"You Should Know"	0:34
6.	"Craig Plots"	3:40
7.	"Malkovich Shrine"	0:45
8.	"Embarcation"	1:46
9.	"Subcon Chase"	2:03
10.	"The Truth"	1:21
11.	"Love on the Phone"	0:46
12.	"To Lester's"	0:26
13.	"Maxine Kidnapped"	1:15
14.	"To Be John M"	1:59
15.	"Craig's Overture"	1:00
16.	"Allegro from Music for Strings, Percussion and Celesta, SZ106" (Béla Bartók)	7:21
17.	"Carter Explains Scene 71 to the Orchestra"	0:29
18.	"Lotte Makes Love"	1:28
19.	"Monkey Memories"	1:32
20.	"Future Vessel"	3:40
21.	"Amphibian" (Film Mix, written by Björk)	4:37

== Release ==
=== Theatrical release and box office ===
Being John Malkovich was given limited release in the United States theatres on October 22, 1999, and opened across 25 screens. On its opening weekend, the film grossed US$637,731 across 25 screens with a per-screen average of $25,495. It expanded to another 150 screens the following week, bringing in $1.9 million with a per-screen average of $10,857. In its third week, the film's release widened to 467 locations and grossed $2.4 million, averaging a lower $5,041 per screen with a cumulative gross of $6.1 million. It moved into a wide release the next week, expanding to 591 screens, and grossed $1.9 million with a 20% drop in ticket sales. Its fifth week brought in $2.2 million with a 17% increase in ticket sales, which dropped a further 33% the following week despite further expansion to 624 screens. It finished its theatrical run after 26 weeks with a total gross of $22,863,596.

PolyGram Filmed Entertainment was originally supposed to release this film outside the United States. However, as a result of Seagram acquiring PolyGram's assets, its film division was folded into a new entity named Universal Pictures International, with all projects in different stages of development now transferred to that company. The film opened in the United Kingdom in March 2000, earning £296,282 in its debut week and closing after fifteen weeks with a total gross of £1,098,927. In France, the film opened in December 1999 with a gross of US$546,000 from 94 venues and went on to further success due to positive reviews and word of mouth. It grossed $205,100 from 109 screens on its opening weekend in Italy and ticket sales dropped by 37% the following week with a cumulative gross of $480,000 from 82 screens. Its German release brought in a total of $243,071. Being John Malkovich had a total foreign gross of $9,523,455, combined with its domestic gross to give an international total of over $32 million.

=== Home media ===
Being John Malkovich was initially released in 2000 on VHS, both as a regular edition and a limited edition collector's set, and on DVD, with special features including a theatrical trailer, TV spots, cast and crew biographies, the director's photo album and featurettes on floor 7½ and puppeteering. A special edition DVD, released later the same year, included the aforementioned features, an interview with Jonze and two behind-the-scenes featurettes. It was released on HD DVD in 2008. The Criterion Collection released a special edition of the film on Blu-ray and DVD in 2012.

== Reception ==
=== Critical response ===
On Rotten Tomatoes, the film holds an approval rating of 94% based on 133 reviews, with an average rating of 8.9/10. The site's critical consensus reads, "Smart, funny, and highly original, Being John Malkovich supports its wild premise with skillful direction and a stellar ensemble cast." On Metacritic, the film has a weighted average score of 90 out of 100 based on 36 critics reviews, indicating "universal acclaim".

Roger Ebert awarded the film a full four stars, writing: "What an endlessly inventive movie this is! Charlie Kaufman, the writer of Being John Malkovich, supplies a dazzling stream of inventions, twists, and wicked paradoxes. And the director, Spike Jonze, doesn't pounce on each one like fresh prey, but unveils it slyly, as if there's more where that came from... The movie has ideas enough for half a dozen films, but Jonze and his cast handle them so surely that we never feel hard-pressed; we're enchanted by one development after the next". He concluded: "Every once in a long, long while a movie comes along that is unlike any other. A movie that creates a new world for us and uses it to produce wonderful things. Forrest Gump was a movie like that, and so in different ways were M*A*S*H, This Is Spinal Tap, After Hours, Babe and There's Something About Mary. What do such films have in common? Nothing. That's the point. Each one stakes out a completely new place and colonizes it with limitless imagination. Either Being John Malkovich gets nominated for best picture, or the members of the Academy need portals into their brains." He later named it the best film of 1999. Peter Rainer, writing for New York, commented that "dazzlingly singular movies aren't often this much fun" and Owen Gleiberman, writing for Entertainment Weekly, called it "the most excitingly original movie of the year." In 2006, Writers Guild of America West ranked its screenplay 74th in WGA’s list of 101 Greatest Screenplays.

=== Accolades ===
Award	Award category	Recipients	Result
Academy Awards	Best Director	Spike Jonze	Nominated
Academy Awards	Best Supporting Actress	Catherine Keener	Nominated
Academy Awards	Best Original Screenplay	Charlie Kaufman	Nominated
American Comedy Awards	Funniest Motion Picture	Being John Malkovich	Nominated
American Comedy Awards	Funniest Supporting Actor in a Motion Picture	John Malkovich	Won
American Comedy Awards	Funniest Supporting Actress in a Motion Picture	Cameron Diaz	Nominated
BAFTA Awards	Best Actress in a Supporting Role	Cameron Diaz	Nominated
BAFTA Awards	Best Screenplay - Original	Charlie Kaufman	Won
BAFTA Awards	Best Editing	Eric Zumbrunnen	Nominated
César Awards	Best Foreign Film	Spike Jonze	Nominated
GLAAD Media Awards	Outstanding Film – Wide Release	Being John Malkovich	Won
Golden Globe Awards	Best Motion Picture – Musical or Comedy	Being John Malkovich	Nominated
Golden Globe Awards	Best Supporting Actress – Motion Picture	Cameron Diaz	Nominated
Golden Globe Awards	Best Supporting Actress – Motion Picture	Catherine Keener	Nominated
Golden Globe Awards	Best Screenplay	Charlie Kaufman	Nominated
Hugo Awards	Best Dramatic Presentation	Spike Jonze & Charlie Kaufman	Nominated
Independent Spirit Awards	Best First Feature - Over $500,000	Spike Jonze, Michael Stipe, Sandy Stern, Steve Golin, Vincent Landay	Won
Independent Spirit Awards	Best First Screenplay	Charlie Kaufman	Won
Independent Spirit Awards	Best Male Lead	John Cusack	Nominated
MTV Movie Awards	Best New Filmmaker	Spike Jonze	Won
Saturn Awards	Best Fantasy Film	Being John Malkovich	Won
Saturn Awards	Best Writing	Charlie Kaufman	Won
Saturn Awards	Best Actress	Catherine Keener	Nominated
Screen Actors Guild Awards	Outstanding Performance by a Female Actor in a Supporting Role	Cameron Diaz	Nominated
Screen Actors Guild Awards	Outstanding Performance by a Female Actor in a Supporting Role	Catherine Keener	Nominated
Screen Actors Guild Awards	Outstanding Performance by a Cast in a Motion Picture	Orson Bean, John Cusack, Cameron Diaz, Catherine Keener, John Malkovich, Mary Kay Place, Charlie Sheen	Nominated
Teen Choice Awards	Choice Movie Actress	Cameron Diaz	Nominated

== See also ==
- Being Michael Madsen
- The Unbearable Weight of Massive Talent
