= Arcade Fire discography =

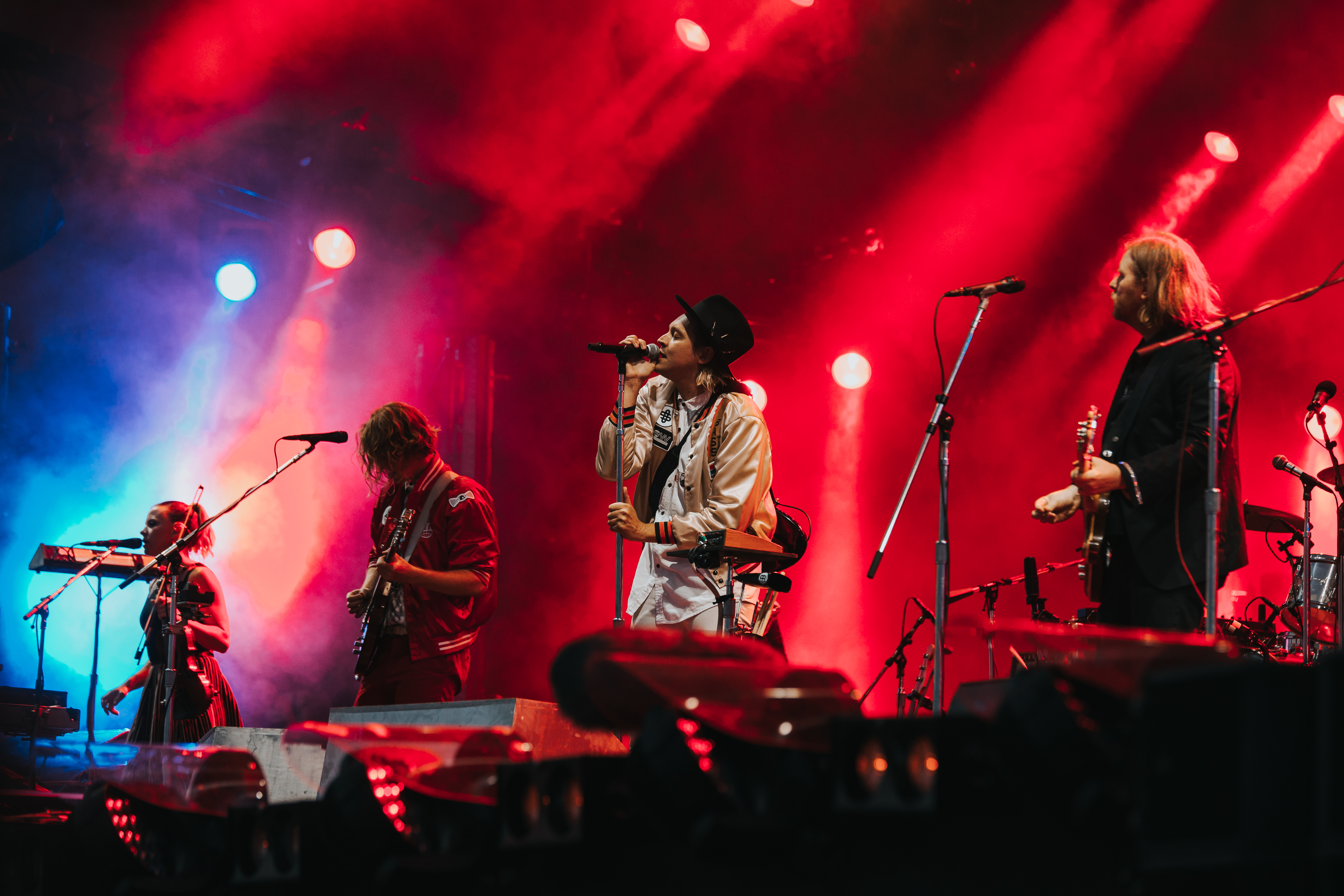
- Arcade Fire performing live in 2017
- Studio albums: 8
- Extended plays: 3
- Soundtrack albums: 1
- Singles: 24
- Promotional singles: 11
- Music videos: 25

The Canadian indie rock band Arcade Fire has released seven studio albums, three extended plays, twenty-four singles, and eleven promotional singles. The group released their self-titled debut EP in 2003. This was followed by their debut studio album, Funeral, released on the 14th of September, 2004. Five singles were released from the album, including the Platinum-certified singles "Rebellion (Lies)" and "Wake Up". The album itself was also certified 2× Platinum in Canada and Platinum in the United Kingdom. After releasing a live EP with David Bowie in 2005, they released their second studio album, Neon Bible, on the 6th of March, 2007. Three singles were released for the album, including "No Cars Go", previously from their self-titled debut EP. The album itself topped charts in Canada and Ireland, and was certified 2× Platinum in Ireland and Platinum in Canada and the United Kingdom.

Their third studio album, The Suburbs, was released on the 2nd of August, 2010. Four singles were released from the album, and the album itself topped charts in Canada, Belgium, Ireland, Portugal, the United Kingdom, and the United States. On the 28th of October, 2013, the band released their fourth studio album, Reflektor. Four singles were released from the album, including their first Billboard Hot 100 entry, "Reflektor". The album itself topped charts in Canada, the United Kingdom, and the United States. Their fifth studio album, Everything Now, was released on the 28th of July, 2017. Five singles were released from the album, which topped charts in Canada, the United Kingdom, and the United States. After releasing a soundtrack album with Owen Pallett, they released their sixth studio album, We, on the 6th of May, 2022, which topped charts in the UK, Portugal, the Netherlands, and Ireland. Their seventh studio album, Pink Elephant, was released on the 9th of May, 2025, and peaked within the top 10 on the Belgian Albums Chart.

== Albums ==
=== Studio albums ===
List of studio albums, with selected chart positions, sales figures and certifications
Title	Album details	Peak chart positions										Sales	Certifications
Title	Album details	CAN	AUS	BEL	FRA	GER	IRL	NLD	POR	UK	US	Sales	Certifications
Funeral	Released: September 14, 2004 (CAN); Label: Merge; Formats: CD, LP, digital download	23	80	59	61	96	16	42	16	33	123	UK: 364,851; US: 504,000	MC: 2× Platinum; BPI: Platinum; RIAA: Gold
Neon Bible	Released: March 6, 2007 (CAN); Label: Merge; Formats: CD, LP, digital download	1	7	5	9	11	1	13	2	2	2	UK: 374,430; US: 439,000	MC: Platinum; ARIA: Gold; BPI: Platinum; IRMA: 2× Platinum
The Suburbs	Released: August 2, 2010 (CAN); Label: Merge; Formats: CD, LP, digital download	1	6	1	3	4	1	4	1	1	1	UK: 373,454; US: 765,000	MC: 2× Platinum; ARIA: Gold; BPI: Platinum; BRMA: Gold; IRMA: Platinum; RIAA: Gold; SNEP: Gold
Reflektor	Released: October 28, 2013 (CAN); Label: Merge; Formats: CD, LP, digital download	1	3	1	3	6	1	6	1	1	1	CAN: 101,000; UK: 156,414; US: 367,000	MC: 4× Platinum; BPI: Gold; SNEP: Gold
Everything Now	Released: July 28, 2017; Label: Sonovox, Columbia; Formats: CD, LP, CS, digital download	1	2	1	2	5	1	2	1	1	1		MC: Platinum; BPI: Gold
We	Released: May 6, 2022; Label: Columbia; Formats: CD, LP, CS, digital download	3	11	4	2	5	1	1	1	1	6		BPI: Silver
Pink Elephant	Released: May 9, 2025; Label: Columbia; Formats: CD, LP, CS, digital download	60	—	3	37	11	45	26	9	18	— (Note: "Pink Elephant" did not enter the Billboard 200, but peaked at number 12 on the US Album Sales chart.)		
Open Your Heart or Die Trying	Released: April 18, 2026; Label: Columbia; Formats: LP	—	—	—	—	—	—	—	—	—	—		
"—" denotes a recording that did not chart or was not released in that territory.

=== Soundtrack albums ===
List of soundtrack albums, with selected chart positions
Title	Album details	Peak chart positions									
Title	Album details	AUT	BEL (FL)	BEL (WA)	FRA	GER	POR	SCO	SPA	UK	US
Her (Original Score) (with Owen Pallett)	Released: March 19, 2021; Label: Milan; Formats: cassette, LP, digital download	72	130	54	140	14	23	12	95	51	— (Note: "Her (Original Score)" did not enter the Billboard 200, but peaked at number 54 on the US Album Sales chart.)
"—" denotes a recording that did not chart or was not released in that territory.

== Extended plays ==
List of extended plays, with selected chart positions
Title	Details	Peak chart positions									
Title	Details	CAN	BEL	FRA	JPN	NLD	SCO	SWI	UK	US	US Indie
Arcade Fire	Released: 2003 (CAN); Label: Merge; Formats: CD, digital download	48	—	93	—	— (Note: Arcade Fire (EP) did not enter the Netherlands' Album Top 100 but peaked on the Netherlands' Vinyl 33 Chart at number 16.)	18	—	39	— (Note: Arcade Fire did not enter the US Billboard 200, but peaked at number 17 on the US Heatseekers Albums Chart.)	30
Live EP (with David Bowie)	Released: 2005 (UK); Label: EMI; Formats: Digital download	—	—	—	—	—	—	—	—	—	—
The Reflektor Tapes	Released: October 16, 2015; Label: Virgin EMI Records; Formats: CS	—	— (Note: The Reflektor Tapes did not enter the Ultratop 200 Albums, but peaked at number eight on the Muziek-DVD chart.)	—	— (Note: The Reflektor Tapes did not enter the Japan Album Sales Chart, but peaked at number 153 on the Japan DVD Sales chart.)	— (Note: The Reflektor Tapes did not enter the Netherlands' Album Top 100 but peaked on the Netherlands' DVD Music Chart at number four.)	—	— (Note: The Reflektor Tapes did not enter the Swiss Hitparade Album Chart but peaked on the Swiss Hitparade DVD Music Chart at number four.)	— (Note: The Reflektor Tapes did not enter the UK Albums Chart, but peaked at number six on the UK Official Music Video Chart Top 50.)	— (Note: "The Reflektor Tapes" did not enter the Billboard 200, but peaked at number four on the Music Video Sales chart.)	—
"—" denotes a recording that did not chart or was not released in that territory.

== Singles ==
List of singles, with selected chart positions, showing year released and album name
Title	Year	Peak chart positions										Certifications	Album
Title	Year	CAN	AUS	BEL (FL)	BEL (WA)	FRA	IRL	SPA	SWI	UK	US	Certifications	Album
"Neighborhood #1 (Tunnels)"	2004	—	—	—	—	—	—	—	—	— (Note: "Neighborhood 1 (Tunnels)" did not enter the UK Official Singles Chart Top 100 but peaked at number 4 on the Official Physical Singles Chart Top 100.)	—		Funeral
"Neighborhood #2 (Laïka)"	2005	—	—	—	—	—	—	—	—	30	—		Funeral
"Neighborhood #3 (Power Out)"	2005	—	—	—	—	—	—	—	—	26	—		Funeral
"Cold Wind"	2005	—	—	—	—	—	—	—	—	52	—		Non-album single
"Rebellion (Lies)"	2005	—	—	— (Note: "Rebellion (Lies)" did not enter the Ultratop 50, but peaked at number 13 on the Flemish Back Catalogue Singles chart.)	—	—	—	—	—	19	—	MC: Platinum	Funeral
"Wake Up"	2005	—	—	—	—	—	40	—	—	29	—	MC: Platinum	Funeral
"Keep the Car Running"	2007	41	—	—	—	—	—	—	—	56	— (Note: "Keep the Car Running" did not enter the Billboard Hot 100, but peaked at number seven on the Hot Singles Sales chart.)	MC: Gold	Neon Bible
"Intervention"	2007	—	—	— (Note: "Intervention" did not enter the Flanders Ultratop 50, but peaked at number 11 on the Ultratip chart.)	—	—	17	—	—	81	—		Neon Bible
"No Cars Go"	2007	—	—	— (Note: "No Cars Go" did not enter the Flanders Ultratop 50, but peaked at number 12 on the Ultratip chart.)	—	—	39	—	—	85	—		Neon Bible
"The Suburbs" / "Month of May"	2010	94	—	— (Note: "The Suburbs" did not enter the Flanders Ultratop 50, but peaked at number 5 on the Ultratip chart.)	— (Note: "The Suburbs" did not enter the Wallonie Ultratop 50, but peaked at number 10 on the Ultratip chart.)	—	—	—	—	— (Note: "The Suburbs" did not enter the UK Official Singles Chart Top 100 but peaked at number 13 on the Official Physical Singles Chart Top 100.)	—	BPI: Silver	The Suburbs
"We Used to Wait"	2010	67	—	31	40	—	—	—	— (Note: "We Used to Wait" did not enter the Swiss Singles chart, but charted at number 99 on the Swiss Airplay chart.)	75	—		The Suburbs
"Ready to Start"	2010	49	—	— (Note: "Ready to Start" did not enter the Flanders Ultratop 50, but peaked at number 4 on the Ultratip chart.)	— (Note: "Ready to Start" did not enter the Wallonie Ultratop 50, but peaked at number 29 on the Ultratip chart.)	—	—	—	—	67	— (Note: "Ready to Start" did not enter the Billboard Hot 100, but peaked at number 17 on the Bubbling Under Hot 100 Singles chart, which acts as an extension to the Hot 100.)		The Suburbs
"Sprawl II (Mountains Beyond Mountains)"	2011	—	—	—	—	—	—	—	—	— (Note: "Sprawl II (Mountains Beyond Mountains)" did not enter the UK Official Singles Chart Top 100 but peaked at number 33 on the Official Physical Singles Chart Top 100.)	— (Note: "Sprawl II (Mountains Beyond Mountains)" did not enter the Billboard Hot 100, but peaked at number 10 on the Hot Singles Sales chart.)		The Suburbs
"Reflektor"	2013	20	96	35	38	67	20	42	—	44	99	MC: Platinum	Reflektor
"Afterlife"	2013	100	—	— (Note: "Afterlife" did not enter the Flanders Ultratop 50, but peaked at number 3 on the Ultratip chart.)	— (Note: "Afterlife" did not enter the Wallonie Ultratop 50, but peaked at number 14 on the Ultratip chart.)	159	—	—	—	—	—		Reflektor
"We Exist"	2014	—	—	— (Note: "We Exist" did not enter the Flanders Ultratop 50, but peaked at number 3 on the Ultratip chart.)	—	—	—	—	—	— (Note: "We Exist" did not enter the UK Singles Chart, but peaked at number 58 on the UK Streaming Chart.)	—		Reflektor
"Get Right" (Note: "Get Right" was included in the "deluxe edition" of Reflektor.)	2015	—	—	—	—	—	—	—	—	— (Note: "Get Right" did not enter the UK Official Singles Chart Top 100 but peaked at number 1 on the Official Physical Singles Chart Top 100.)	—		Reflektor
"I Give You Power" (featuring Mavis Staples)	2017	— (Note: "I Give You Power" did not enter the Billboard Canadian Hot 100, but peaked at number 39 on the Canadian Digital Song Sales chart.)	—	— (Note: "I Give You Power" did not enter the Flanders Ultratop 50, but charted as an extra tip on the Flanders Ultratip chart.)	— (Note: "I Give You Power" did not enter the Wallonie Ultratop 50, but charted as an extra tip on the Ultratip chart.)	155	—	—	—	—	—		Non-album single
"Everything Now"	2017	70	— (Note: "Everything Now" did not enter the Australian Single Top 100 but peaked on the ARIA Hitseekers chart at number 11.)	21	20	32	71	21	99	50	— (Note: "Everything Now" did not enter the Billboard Hot 100, but peaked at number four on the Hot Singles Sales chart.)	MC: Platinum; ARIA: Gold; BPI: Gold	Everything Now
"Creature Comfort"	2017	—	—	— (Note: "Creature Comfort" did not enter the Flanders Ultratop 50, but peaked at number 6 on the Ultratip chart.)	— (Note: "Creature Comfort" did not enter the Wallonie Ultratop 50, but charted as an extra tip on the Ultratip chart.)	144	—	—	—	— (Note: "Creature Comfort" did not enter the UK Official Singles Chart Top 100 but peaked at number 2 on the Official Physical Singles Chart Top 100.)	—	MC: Gold	Everything Now
"Signs of Life"	2017	—	—	—	—	132	—	—	—	—	—		Everything Now
"Electric Blue"	2017	—	—	—	—	—	—	—	—	—	—		Everything Now
"Put Your Money on Me"	2018	—	—	— (Note: "Put Your Money on Me" did not enter the Flanders Ultratop 50, but peaked at number 10 on the Ultratip chart.)	— (Note: "Put Your Money on Me" did not enter the Wallonie Ultratop 50, but peaked at number 33 on the Ultratip chart.)	160	—	—	—	— (Note: "Put Your Money on Me" did not enter the UK Official Singles Chart Top 100 but peaked at number 1 on the Official Physical Singles Chart Top 100.)	—		Everything Now
"The Lightning I, II"	2022	—	—	—	—	—	—	—	—	— (Note: "The Lightning I, II" did not enter the UK Singles Chart, but charted as two separate songs on the UK Singles Sales Chart. "The Lightning I" peaked at 80 and "The Lightning II" peaked at 88.)	—		We
"Unconditional I (Lookout Kid)"	2022	— (Note: "Unconditional I (Lookout Kid)" did not enter the Billboard Canadian Hot 100, but peaked at number 37 on the Canadian Digital Song Sales chart.)	—	—	—	—	—	—	— (Note: "Unconditional I (Lookout Kid)" did not enter the Swiss Singles chart, but charted at number 60 on the Swiss Airplay chart.)	— (Note: "Unconditional I (Lookout Kid)" did not enter the UK Singles Chart, but peaked on the UK Singles Sales Chart at 76.)	—		We
"Year of the Snake"	2025	—	—	—	—	—	—	—	—	—	—		Pink Elephant
"Pink Elephant"	2025	—	—	—	—	—	—	—	—	—	—		Pink Elephant
"—" denotes a recording that did not chart or was not released in that territory.

=== Promotional singles ===
List of singles showing year released and album name
Title	Year	Peak chart positions							Album
Title	Year	BEL (FL) Tip	BEL (WA) Tip	ICE	MEX Eng.	US AAA	US Alt. DL	US Rock DL	Album
"Black Mirror"	2007	—	—	—	—	—	—	—	Neon Bible
"Burning Bridges" (Note: "Burning Bridges" was released as a free digital download.)	2008	—	—	—	—	—	—	—	Non-album single
"Modern Man"	2010	—	—	—	—	8	—	—	The Suburbs
"City with No Children"	2011	24	—	—	34	—	—	—	The Suburbs
"Speaking in Tongues" (Note: "Speaking in Tongues" was included in the "deluxe edition" of The Suburbs.) (featuring David Byrne)	2011	11	39	—	—	—	—	—	The Suburbs
"Abraham's Daughter"	2012	—	—	—	—	—	18	26	The Hunger Games: Songs from District 12 and Beyond
"You Already Know"	2014	—	—	—	—	—	—	—	Reflektor
"Chemistry"	2018	—	—	—	—	—	—	—	Everything Now
"Peter Pan"	2018	—	—	—	36	—	—	—	Everything Now
"Baby Mine"	2019	44	—	5	—	—	—	—	Dumbo (Original Soundtrack)
"Circle of Trust"	2025	—	—	—	—	—	—	—	Pink Elephant
"—" denotes a recording that did not chart or was not released in that territory.

=== Split singles ===
List of singles, with notes, showing year released and album name
Title	Year	Notes	Album
"Poupée de cire, poupée de son" / "No Love Lost"	2007	Limited edition split single with LCD Soundsystem	Non-album single

== Other charted and certified songs ==
List of songs, with selected chart positions, showing year released and album name
Title	Year	Peak chart positions					Certifications	Album
Title	Year	DEN	MEX Eng.	UK Stream	UK Rock	US Rock	Certifications	Album
"In the Backseat"	2004	—	—	—	—	—	BPI: Silver	Funeral
"My Body Is a Cage"	2007	28	—	—	—	—		Neon Bible
"Flashbulb Eyes"	2013	—	—	80	—	—		Reflektor
"Normal Person"	2013	—	—	89	—	48		Reflektor
"Joan of Arc"	2013	—	42	—	—	—		Reflektor
"Here Comes the Night Time"	2013	—	46	69	—	—		Reflektor
"Infinite_Content"	2017	—	—	—	20	—		Everything Now
"Age Of Anxiety II (Rabbit Hole)"	2022	—	—	—	—	49		We
"—" denotes a recording that did not chart or was not released in that territory.

== Other appearances ==
Title	Year	Album
"Lenin"	2009	Dark Was the Night
"Games Without Frontiers"	2013	And I'll Scratch Yours

== Music videos ==
Title	Year	Director(s)
"Neighborhood #1 (Tunnels)"	2005	Josh Deu and Lance Bangs
"Neighborhood #2 (Laïka)"	2005	Josh Deu
"Neighborhood #3 (Power Out)"	2005	Plates Animation
"Rebellion (Lies)"	2005	Chris Grismer
"Black Mirror"	2007	Olivier Groulx and Tracy Maurice
"Ready to Start"	2010	Charlie Lightning
"We Used to Wait"	2010	Chris Milk
"The Suburbs"	2010	Spike Jonze
"Sprawl II (Mountains Beyond Mountains)"	2011	Vincent Morisset
"Reflektor"	2013	Anton Corbijn
"Afterlife"	2013	Emily Kai Bock
"Afterlife" (live)	2013	Spike Jonze
"Here Comes the Night Time"	2013	Roman Coppola
"We Exist"	2014	David Wilson
"You Already Know"	2014	Win Butler
"Porno"	2015	Kahlil Joseph
"Everything Now"	2017	The Sacred Egg
"Creature Comfort"	2017	Tarik Mikou
"Signs of Life"	2017	Mayer/Leyva (Borscht)
"Electric Blue"	2017	Cousin Club
"Money + Love" (Note: "Money + Love" is a joint music video for the songs “Put Your Money on Me” and “We Don’t Deserve Love”.)	2018	David Wilson
"Chemistry"	2018	Ray Tintori
"Peter Pan"	2018	Storm Saulter
"The Lightning I, II"	2022	Emily Kai Bock
"Unconditional I (Lookout Kid)"	2022	Benh Zeitlin
"Year of the Snake"	2025	David Wilson and Mark Prendergast
