= City with No Children =

Single by Arcade Fire

from the album The Suburbs
- Released: March 14, 2011
- Recorded: 2010
- Genre: Indie rock
- Length: 3:11
- Label: Merge (US), Mercury (UK)
- Songwriter(s): Arcade Fire (William Butler (musician), Win Butler, Régine Chassagne, Jeremy Gara, Tim Kingsbury, Richard Reed Parry)
- Producer(s): Arcade Fire, Markus Dravs

Arcade Fire singles chronology
"Ready to Start" (2010)	"City with No Children" (2011)	"Speaking in Tongues" (2011)

"City with No Children" is a single from Arcade Fire's third album The Suburbs. It was released as a single on March 14, 2011.

== Track listings ==
Promo CD single

1. "City with No Children" – 3:11

== Credits and personnel ==
- Win Butler – lead vocals, guitar
- Régine Chassagne – backing vocals, drums
- Richard Reed Parry – guitar, string arrangements
- Tim Kingsbury – bass
- William Butler – keyboards, guitar
- Sarah Neufeld – violin, backing vocals, string arrangements
- Jeremy Gara – drums
- Owen Pallett – string arrangements
- Marika Anthony Shaw – string arrangements
- Arcade Fire and Markus Dravs – producers
- Craig Silvey and Nick Launay – mixing

== Chart performance ==
Chart performance
Chart (2011)	Peak
Belgium (Ultratip Bubbling Under Flanders)	24
