= Speaking in Tongues (Arcade Fire song) =

Single by Arcade Fire featuring David Byrne

from the album The Suburbs
- Released: June 27, 2011
- Genre: Indie rock
- Label: Mercury
- Songwriters: Arcade Fire (William Butler, Win Butler, Régine Chassagne, Jeremy Gara, Tim Kingsbury, Richard Reed Parry)
- Producer: Arcade Fire

Arcade Fire singles chronology
"City With No Children" (2010)	"Speaking in Tongues" (2011)	"Sprawl II (Mountains Beyond Mountains)" (2012)

David Byrne singles chronology
"Please Don't" (2010)	"Speaking in Tongues" (2011)	"Who" (2012)

"Speaking in Tongues" is the fifth single from indie rock band Arcade Fire's third album, The Suburbs. It did not appear on the original track listing, but showed up on the deluxe edition as a bonus track.

There is a direct reference to T.S Eliot's The Waste Land: "Hypocrite reader, my double, my brother", himself quoting Baudelaire's To the Reader: "— Hypocrite lecteur, — mon semblable, — mon frère!"

The title itself is a reference to the Bible (Acts 2:4; 1 Corinthians 14:18) to a phenomenon called glossolalia, which is believed to be a divine language unknown to the speaker. It is also a reference to the 1983 album of the same name by Talking Heads, the former band of guest singer David Byrne.

== Credits and personnel ==
- Win Butler – lead vocals, guitar
- Régine Chassagne – backing vocals, drums
- David Byrne – backing vocals
- Richard Reed Parry – guitar, string arrangements
- Tim Kingsbury – bass
- William Butler – keyboards, guitar
- Sarah Neufeld – violin, backing vocals, string arrangements
- Jeremy Gara – drums
- Owen Pallett – string arrangements
- Marika Anthony Shaw – string arrangements
- Arcade Fire and Markus Dravs – producers
- Craig Silvey and Nick Launay – mixing

== Chart performance ==
Chart (2012–13)	Peak position
Belgium (Ultratip Bubbling Under Flanders)	11
Belgium (Ultratip Bubbling Under Wallonia)	39
