= Sprawl II (Mountains Beyond Mountains) =

Single by Arcade Fire

from the album The Suburbs
- B-side: "Ready to Start" (12")
- Released: April 21, 2012
- Genre: Synth-pop; dance-rock
- Length: 5:25 (album version); 6:44 (single version)
- Label: Merge; Sonovox
- Songwriter: Régine Chassagne (As R. Chassagne)
- Producers: Arcade Fire; Damian Taylor (single)

Arcade Fire singles chronology
"Speaking in Tongues" (2011)	"Sprawl II (Mountains Beyond Mountains)" (2012)	"Reflektor" (2013)

"Sprawl II (Mountains Beyond Mountains)" (also known simply as "Sprawl II") is a song by Canadian indie rock band Arcade Fire. It was released as the sixth and final single from their third studio album, The Suburbs, on April 21, 2012. Two music videos were released for the song, one "traditional" and one interactive, both of which were released on December 13, 2011.

== Composition ==
"Sprawl II" is a synthpop song. It features vocals delivered by Arcade Fire band member Régine Chassagne and was primarily inspired by the 2003 Tracy Kidder book, Mountains Beyond Mountains.

== Release ==
A remix of "Sprawl II" by the Belgian electronic band Soulwax was previewed on BBC Radio 1 on March 20, 2012. Later that year, the song was released as a 12-inch single on April 21 as part of Record Store Day 2012. A remixed version of the song appears as the A-side, with a remixed version of another track from The Suburbs, "Ready to Start", as the B-side. Both remixes were done by Canadian music producer Damian Taylor.

== Critical reception ==
Pitchfork awarded "Sprawl II" the designation of Best New Track, with critic Larry Fitzmaurice calling the disco production "a glorious change-up for the band and its fans". In a retrospective analysis, Jim Beviglia of American Songwriter called the song a "rousing anthem" and one of The Suburbs' "finest moments". In best songs of the decade rankings, "Sprawl II" was ranked number 74 by Uproxx, number 50 by Pitchfork, and number 20 by NME.

== Music video ==
A music video for "Sprawl II", lasting five minutes and forty seconds, was released by Merge Records on December 13, 2011, prior the song's physical release, through YouTube. The video was directed by Vincent Morisset and primarily features Régine Chassagne throughout the video. An interactive version of the music video was also made available, where the user can determine the video's speed by dancing along using their webcam.

== Track listing ==
- Merge / Sonovox — MRG442

Side A
No.	Title	Length
1.	"Sprawl II (Mountains Beyond Mountains)"	6:44

Side B
No.	Title	Length
1.	"Ready to Start"	7:53

== Charts ==
Chart (2012–13)	Peak position
Canada Rock (Billboard)	48
Mexico Ingles Airplay (Billboard)	24
US Dance Singles Sales (Billboard)	4
US Hot Singles Sales (Billboard)	10

== Release history ==
Region	Date	Label	Format	Catalogue no.
United States	April 21, 2012	Merge; Sonovox	12"	MRG442
United Kingdom	April 21, 2012	Sonovox	12"	2793767
