= The Suburbs =

Studio album by Arcade Fire
- Released: August 3, 2010
- Recorded: 2008–2010
- Studios: Petite Église, Farnham, Quebec; Magic Shop, New York City; Studio Frisson, Montreal; Public Hi-Fi, Austin, Texas
- Genres: Indie rock; art rock; baroque pop
- Length: 63:55
- Labels: Merge; City Slang; Mercury
- Producers: Arcade Fire; Markus Dravs

Arcade Fire chronology
Neon Bible (2007)	The Suburbs (2010)	Reflektor (2013)

Singles from The Suburbs
- 1. "The Suburbs"/"Month of May" Released: 2010; 2. "We Used to Wait" Released: 2010; 3. "Ready to Start" Released: 2010; 4. "City with No Children" Released: 2011; 5. "Speaking in Tongues" Released: 2011; 6. "Sprawl II (Mountains Beyond Mountains)" Released: 2012

The Suburbs is the third studio album by Canadian indie rock band Arcade Fire, released on August 3, 2010, by Merge Records. Coinciding with its announcement, the band released a limited edition 12-inch single containing the title track and "Month of May". Produced by Markus Dravs, the album debuted at number one in Canada, the United States, United Kingdom and Ireland.

The Suburbs received critical acclaim. It won Album of the Year at the 2011 Grammy Awards and the 2011 Juno Awards, Best International Album at the 2011 BRIT Awards, and the 2011 Polaris Music Prize for best Canadian album. Two weeks after winning Grammy's Album of the Year, the album jumped from No. 52 to No. 12 on the Billboard 200, the album's highest ranking since August 2010.

A deluxe edition CD/DVD of The Suburbs was released worldwide on June 27, 2011, with an American and Canadian release were on August 2, 2011, to coincide with the original album's anniversary. The new version included two brand new tracks recorded during The Suburbs album sessions ("Culture War" and "Speaking in Tongues", the latter featuring David Byrne), an extended version of album track "Wasted Hours", Spike Jonze's short film, Scenes from the Suburbs, and an 80-page booklet as well as other exclusive content.

== Background ==
The album's lyrical content is inspired by band members Win and William Butler's upbringing in The Woodlands, Texas, a suburb of Houston. According to Win Butler, the album "is neither a love letter to, nor an indictment of, the suburbs – it's a letter from the suburbs". The album was recorded in Win Butler and Régine Chassagne's residence in Montreal, with some parts being recorded at the band's studio in Quebec and in New York City. Win Butler describes the overall sound of The Suburbs as "a mix of Depeche Mode and Neil Young", stating that he wanted the album to sound like "the bands that I heard when I was very young, and wondered what those crazy noises were". It was released by Merge Records in North America and by Mercury Records in the United Kingdom.

The band pressed each completed song to a 12″ lacquer, then recorded it back for the digital master of the album. There are eight alternative covers for the CD version of the album.

== Promotion ==
A video for "Ready to Start" was released on August 20, 2010, directed by Charlie Lightning and filmed at the band's July 7, 2010 concert at the Hackney Empire in London. On August 30, 2010, an interactive video was released for "We Used to Wait" at http://www.thewildernessdowntown.com, written and directed by Chris Milk, designed in conjunction with Google Chrome, which makes use of Google Maps and Google Street View, and has been featured in Time's "Short List".

Another music video, for the title track "The Suburbs", was released on November 18, 2010, directed by Spike Jonze. The video, filmed in Austin, Texas, follows a group of teenagers living in the suburbs, and features cameos by Win Butler and Sarah Neufeld as police officers. The music video is composed of excerpts from Jonze's short film, Scenes from the Suburbs, which debuted at the Berlin International Film Festival 2011, and has a running time of 30 minutes. Scenes from the Suburbs screened at the SXSW Film Festival 2011 and saw its online premiere on MUBI on June 27, 2011. Writing for the Canadian Press, Nick Patch called the film "a sci-fi puzzler that seems to blend the paranoia of Terry Gilliam films with the nostalgia of classic Steven Spielberg flicks".

== Critical reception ==
Professional ratings
Aggregate scores
Source	Rating
AnyDecentMusic?	8.6/10
Metacritic	87/100
Review scores
Source	Rating
AllMusic	5/5 stars
The A.V. Club	A−
Entertainment Weekly	A−
The Guardian	4/5 stars
The Independent	5/5 stars
MSN Music (Expert Witness)	A−
NME	4.5/5 stars
Pitchfork	8.6/10
Rolling Stone	4/5 stars
Spin	9/10

The Suburbs received acclaim from music critics. At Metacritic, which assigns a normalized rating out of 100 to reviews from mainstream critics, the album has an average score of 87 out of 100, which indicates "universal acclaim" based on 43 reviews. Writing for BBC Music, Mike Diver described the album as the band's "most thrillingly engrossing chapter yet; a complex, captivating work that, several cycles down the line, retains the magic and mystery of that first tentative encounter" and stated that "you could call it their OK Computer." Several reviewers compared The Suburbs favourably to Arcade Fire's earlier work. Ian Cohen of Pitchfork called it "a satisfying return to form—proof that Arcade Fire can still make grand statements without sounding like they're carrying the weight of the world". Noel Murray of The A.V. Club described the album as being "like one long sequel" to the band's earlier single "No Cars Go". Q wrote that the band "may well have delivered their masterpiece."

David Marchese, writing in Spin, wrote of the album: "Radiant with apocalyptic tension and grasping to sustain real bonds, [it] extends hungrily outward, recalling the dystopic miasma of William Gibson's sci-fi novels and Sonic Youth's guitar odysseys. Desperate to elude its own corrosive dread, it keeps moving, asking, looking, and making the promise that hope isn't just another spiritual cul-de-sac." NME's reviewer Emily Mackay compared The Suburbs to R.E.M.'s Automatic for the People in the sense of it being "an album that combines mass accessibility with much greater ambition. Pretty much perfect, in other words – and despite their best efforts, listening to it feels just like coming home." Uncut designated the album as their "Album of the Month"; in a 4-star review for the magazine, Alastair McKay called it "a surprising record, swapping the spit and fire of Funeral for a sense of mature playfulness", and concluding that "[it] explores the badlands between safety and boredom. It's nostalgic, with a sense of future dread. There is pain and pleasure, loss and hope. It feels like the anesthetic is wearing off."

Exclaim! listed the album as their No. 1 Pop & Rock Album of 2010. Writer Andrea Warner summarized it as "a perfect actualization of the suburbs as metaphor for the classic North American dream: a smoothly perfect veneer covering up the lush complexity of motivation. It's not just metaphor, but goes a step further to exemplify the quintessential Arcade Fire sound ― a controlled frenzy, pushing and reaching for something more."

The album was also included in the 2011 edition of the book 1001 Albums You Must Hear Before You Die.

== Accolades ==
On June 16, 2011, the album was named as a long-listed nominee for the 2011 Polaris Music Prize. On July 6, The Suburbs was awarded a spot on the shortlist, making it one of ten possible candidates to win $30,000 and the recognition as the best Canadian album of the year as voted by jury of Canadian journalists and broadcasters. On September 19, 2011, it won the Polaris Music Prize.

The album won both Album of the Year at the Juno Awards of 2011, as well as the Album of the Year at the 53rd Grammy Awards, and earned a nomination for Best Alternative Music Album, won International Album at the 2011 BRIT Awards and was also on numerous best-albums-of-the-year lists:

- #1 – BBC 6 Music's Top 50 albums of the year
- #1 – Clash Magazine's Top 40 Albums of 2010
- #1 – Exclaim!'s Top 20 Albums of 2010
- #1 – Q Magazine's Top 50 Albums of 2010
- #1 – Triple J Listeners' Top 10 Albums
- #2 – Billboard's Top 10 Albums of 2010
- #2 – Magnet's Top 20 Albums of 2010
- #2 – NME's Top 75 Albums of 2010
- #2 – Relevant Magazine's Top 10 Albums of 2010
- #2 – Stereogum's Top 50 Albums of 2010
- #2 – Time's Top 10 Albums of 2010
- #2 – Under the Radar's Top 50 Albums of 2010
- #3 – Spin's 40 Best Albums of 2010
- #4 – MTV's 20 Best Albums of 2010
- #4 – Rolling Stone's 30 Best Albums of 2010
- #7 – Paste Magazine's 50 Best Albums of 2010
- #9 – American Songwriter's Top 50 Albums of 2010
- #11 – Drowned in Sound's Albums of the Year
- #11 – Pitchfork's Top 50 Albums of 2010
- #21 – Rough Trade Shops's Albums of the Year (UK)
- #23 – Robert Christgau's 2010 Dean's List
- Glide Magazine's Top 20 Albums of 2010
- NPR's 50 Favorite Albums of 2010

The single “Ready to Start” was nominated for the Grammy Award for Best Rock Performance by a Duo or Group with Vocal.

== Track listing ==
All tracks are written by Sarah Neufeld, Richard Reed Parry, Jeremy Gara, Win Butler, Will Butler, Régine Chassagne and Tim Kingsbury. All lead vocals by Win Butler unless otherwise noted.

No.	Title	Lead vocals	Length
1.	"The Suburbs"		5:15
2.	"Ready to Start"		4:15
3.	"Modern Man"		4:39
4.	"Rococo"	Butler, Chassagne	3:56
5.	"Empty Room"	Chassagne	2:51
6.	"City with No Children"		3:11
7.	"Half Light I"	Chassagne, Butler	4:13
8.	"Half Light II (No Celebration)"		4:25
9.	"Suburban War"		4:45
10.	"Month of May"		3:50
11.	"Wasted Hours"		3:20
12.	"Deep Blue"		4:28
13.	"We Used to Wait"		5:01
14.	"Sprawl I (Flatland)"		2:54
15.	"Sprawl II (Mountains Beyond Mountains)"	Chassagne	5:25
16.	"The Suburbs (Continued)"		1:27

Deluxe edition bonus tracks
No.	Title	Length
17.	"Culture War"	5:14
18.	"Speaking in Tongues" (featuring David Byrne)	3:51

Notes

- "Suburban War" is the second to last track on the vinyl version of the album.
- "We Used to Wait" finishes on an infinite loop at the end of Side 3 of the vinyl version.
- In the Deluxe Edition, "Wasted Hours" is retitled as "Wasted Hours (A Life That We Can Live)" and features an extended ending. The track length goes to 4:26.
- Initial copies of the album sold by selected independent music stores came with an exclusive 7" single of "Ready to Start" with a postcard.

== Personnel ==
Arcade Fire

- Will Butler
- Win Butler
- Régine Chassagne
- Jeremy Gara
- Tim Kingsbury
- Sarah Neufeld
- Richard Reed Parry

Additional musicians

- Strings: Sarah Neufeld, Owen Pallett, Richard Reed Parry and Marika Anthony Shaw
- Additional strings: Clarice Jensen, Nadia Sirota, Yuki Numata, Caleb Burhans, Ben Russell and Rob Moose
- Colin Stetson – saxophones (tracks 9, 13 & 15)
- Pietro Amato – French horn (tracks 13 & 15)

Technical

- Arcade Fire – (mixing, production, arrangement)
- Owen Pallett – string arrangements
- Markus Dravs – co-production
- Mark Lawson – recording
- Craig Silvey – mixing
- Nick Launay – additional mixing (tracks 2, 4 & 15)
- Marcus Paquin, Don Murnaghan and Noah Goldstein – additional recording
- Brian Thorn – assistant (Magic Shop)
- Brad Bell – assistant (Public Hi-Fi)
- Adam Greenspan – assistant
- Caroline Robert – artwork design
- Vincent Morisset – art direction
- Gabriel Jones – photography (assisted by Joey Matthews & Stephane Fiore)

== Charts ==
=== Weekly charts ===
Chart (2010)	Peak position
Australian Albums (ARIA)	6
Austrian Albums (Ö3 Austria)	10
Belgian Albums (Ultratop Flanders)	1
Belgian Albums (Ultratop Wallonia)	4
Canadian Albums (Billboard)	1
Danish Albums (Hitlisten)	2
Dutch Albums (Album Top 100)	4
Finnish Albums (Suomen virallinen lista)	5
French Albums (SNEP)	3
German Albums (Offizielle Top 100)	4
Irish Albums (IRMA)	1
Italian Albums (FIMI)	17
New Zealand Albums (RMNZ)	3
Norwegian Albums (VG-lista)	1
Portuguese Albums (AFP)	1
Scottish Albums (Official Charts)	1
Spanish Albums (Promusicae)	2
Swedish Albums (Sverigetopplistan)	8
Swiss Albums (Schweizer Hitparade)	3
UK Albums (Official Charts)	1
US Billboard 200	1
US Top Rock Albums (Billboard)	1

=== Year-end charts ===
Chart (2010)	Position
Belgian Albums (Ultratop Flanders)	51
Canadian Albums (Billboard)	26
French Albums (SNEP)	109
UK Albums (OCC)	57
US Billboard 200	80
US Top Rock Albums (Billboard)	17
Chart (2011)	Position
Canadian Albums (Billboard)	48
UK Albums (OCC)	109
US Billboard 200	97
US Top Rock Albums (Billboard)	14

== Certifications and sales ==
Region	Certification	Certified units/sales
Australia (ARIA)	Gold	35,000^{^}
Belgium (BRMA)	Gold	15,000^{*}
Canada (Music Canada)	3× Platinum	240,000^{‡}
Denmark (IFPI Danmark)	Gold	15,000^{^}
France (SNEP)	Gold	50,000^{*}
Ireland (IRMA)	Platinum	15,000^{^}
New Zealand (RMNZ)	Gold	7,500^{‡}
Spain (Promusicae)	Gold	30,000^{^}
United Kingdom (BPI)	Platinum	373,454
United States (RIAA)	Gold	765,000
Summaries
Worldwide	—	1,000,000
^{*} Sales figures based on certification alone.^{^} Shipments figures based on certification alone.^{‡} Sales+streaming figures based on certification alone.

== See also ==
- List of number-one independent albums (U.S)
