= B-Reel =

- Industry: Interactive, advertising, design, film
- Founded: 1999
- Headquarters: Stockholm, New York City, Los Angeles, Barcelona, Berlin
- Area served: Global
- Key people: Founders: Anders Wahlquist; Petter Westlund; Pelle Nilsson; Johannes Åhlund; Fredrik Heinig
- Number of employees: 150+ employees
- Website: www.b-reel.com

B-Reel is an international creative agency working globally with offices in Stockholm, Los Angeles, New York, Barcelona and Berlin.

B-Reel is a sister company of B-Reel Films (BR•F).

== History ==
B-Reel was founded in 1999 by Anders Wahlquist, Fredrik Heinig, Johannes Åhlund, Pelle Nilsson and Petter Westlund, all of whom are still involved in the company. At the time Åhlund and Heinig were running the television commercial production company Spader Knekt (later renamed St Paul). The two companies, Spader Knekt and B-Reel, worked side by side for several years until the two merged to create B-Reel Films, focusing on drama, television and advertising production.

B-Reel continued to exist under the moniker B-Reel, but as a creative agency offering strategic, creative and digital services for brands.

In 2011, B-Reel was involved in creating The Wilderness Downtown, an interactive music experience for Arcade Fire's song "We Used to Wait", which was included in Time magazine's list of the 30 best music videos.
