= We Used to Wait =

Single by Arcade Fire

from the album The Suburbs
- Released: 2010
- Genre: Baroque pop; indie rock
- Length: 5:02 (album version); 3:28 (radio edit)
- Label: Rough Trade; Merge
- Songwriters: Arcade Fire (William Butler, Win Butler, Régine Chassagne, Jeremy Gara, Tim Kingsbury, Richard Reed Parry)
- Producers: Arcade Fire; Markus Dravs

Arcade Fire singles chronology
"The Suburbs / Month of May" (2010)	"We Used to Wait" (2010)	"Ready to Start" (2010)

"We Used to Wait" is the first UK single from Arcade Fire's third album The Suburbs, following "Ready to Start", which was the first US single. It was released on August 1, 2010 in the UK.

== The Wilderness Downtown ==
The song was used in an experimental project, The Wilderness Downtown, an interactive music video developed by Google Creative Lab and Chris Milk, to experiment and exploit HTML 5 and the then new Google Chrome web browser. It figures prominently in the location-based audiovisual web experience and the name of the project is taken from a line in the song. Rolling Stone named the 'thewildernessdowntown.com' one of the best music videos of 2010. In July 2011, the music video was named one of "The 30 All-TIME Best Music Videos" by TIME Magazine. It was one of three Grand Prix winners at the 2011 Cannes advertising awards in the Cyber category. Viewers were invited to fill out a virtual postcard at the conclusion of the video and the postcards were used to populate background visual for "We Used to Wait" during the Suburbs tour. In February 2011, music video blog Yes, We've Got a Video! ranked the project at number 2 in their top 30 videos of 2010. The project was praised as a "beautiful experiment that has significantly pushed the boundaries of the music video by introducing the factor of interactivity."

== Recording and production ==
Like the rest of the album, "We Used to Wait" was mixed through vintage analog consoles in Montreal and New York by Craig Silvey. In an interview with Paul Tingen, Silvey provided additional information on the challenges with "We Used to Wait"; he stated that the massive number of individual tracks on the premixed recording, over thirty, and elements like the use of three drum kits, was particularly challenging to mix because of the complexity of the textures.

== Reception ==
Rolling Stone named "We Used to Wait" the 5th best song of 2010. Not all reviews were positive: Pop Sugar's Thomas Britt stated the track was "mawkish" and "failed to take off."

In 2017 Paste magazine named it number eleven of the best fifteen Arcade Fire songs and name the song the lynchpin of the entire Suburbs album.

== Covers ==
On 20 October 2010, Mark Ronson and Business Intl, featuring Alex Greenwald on both vocals and the mandolin, and Rose Dougall on backing vocals, covered the song on Jo Whiley’s BBC Radio 1 show. The Drums covered the song in a "Brit-punky" style that "sounds nothing like the original."

== Chart performance ==
Chart (2010)	Peak position
Belgium (Ultratop 50 Flanders)	31
Belgium (Ultratop 50 Wallonia)	40
Canada Rock (Billboard)	20
Netherlands (Single Top 100)	95
Switzerland Airplay (Schweizer Hitparade)	99
UK Singles (Official Charts)	75
US Alternative Airplay (Billboard)	22
US Hot Rock & Alternative Songs (Billboard)	42
