= Ready to Start =

Single by Arcade Fire

from the album The Suburbs
- Released: June 2010
- Genre: Indie rock; post-punk revival; art rock
- Length: 4:15
- Label: Merge; Mercury
- Songwriters: Arcade Fire (William Butler, Win Butler, Régine Chassagne, Jeremy Gara, Tim Kingsbury, Richard Reed Parry)
- Producers: Arcade Fire; Markus Dravs

Arcade Fire singles chronology
"We Used to Wait" (2010)	"Ready to Start" (2010)	"City with No Children" (2011)

Music video
- "Ready to Start" on YouTube

Professional ratings
Review scores
Source	Rating
Rolling Stone	4/5 stars

"Ready to Start" is a single from Arcade Fire's third album The Suburbs. It was released as a single in 2010. The band performed "Ready to Start" as their second performance at the 53rd Grammy Awards, immediately following The Suburbs winning Album of the Year. The band also performed the song at the Brit Awards several days after the Grammy Awards.

== Music video ==
A music video was made for the single and was uploaded to YouTube on August 26, 2010. The video shows the band performing the song in a concert event as part of their world tour.

== Credits and personnel ==
- Win Butler – lead vocals, guitar
- Régine Chassagne – backing vocals, drums
- Richard Reed Parry – guitar, string arrangements
- Tim Kingsbury – bass
- William Butler – keyboards, guitar
- Sarah Neufeld – violin, backing vocals, string arrangements
- Jeremy Gara – drums
- Owen Pallett – string arrangements
- Marika Anthony Shaw – string arrangements
- Arcade Fire and Markus Dravs – producers
- Craig Silvey and Nick Launay – mixing

== Chart performance ==
"Ready to Start" peaked at number 67 on the UK Singles Chart, the band's highest placement since "Keep the Car Running" peaked at number 56 in 2007. The song also peaked at number 16 on the Billboard Alternative Songs chart, the band's highest placement on that chart at the time, surpassing the number 32 placement of "Keep the Car Running" when the chart was known under its original name of Modern Rock Tracks. In 2017, their single "Everything Now" would outpeak the song's ranking on the chart, reaching number 12 there. Additionally, the single peaked at number 25 on the Billboard Rock Songs chart, and in the band's native Canada, at number 49.

Chart (2010)	Peak position
Belgium (Ultratop 50 Flanders)	54
Belgium (Ultratop 50 Wallonia)	79
Canada Hot 100 (Billboard)	49
Canada Rock (Billboard)	9
UK Singles (The Official Charts Company)	67
US Bubbling Under Hot 100 (Billboard)	17
US Alternative Airplay (Billboard)	16
US Hot Rock & Alternative Songs (Billboard)	25
