= The Suburbs/Month of May =

"The Suburbs"/"Month of May"

Single by Arcade Fire

from the album The Suburbs
- Released: 2010
- Genre: Indie rock, post-punk revival
- Length: 5:14
- Label: Mercury
- Songwriter: Arcade Fire
- Producer: Arcade Fire

Arcade Fire singles chronology
"No Cars Go" (2007)	"The Suburbs" / "Month of May" (2010)	"We Used to Wait" (2010)

"The Suburbs"/"Month of May" is a single from Arcade Fire's third album The Suburbs. It was released in 2010. It reached number 94 on the Canadian Hot 100.

== Music video ==
A music video was made for the single and was uploaded to YouTube on November 22, 2010. The video is a shortened version of the short film Scenes from the Suburbs, directed by Spike Jonze and inspired by the album itself.

In February 2011, music video blog Yes, We've Got a Video! ranked the song's music video at number 7 in their top 30 videos of 2010. The video was praised as "a twisted, haunting view of the insecurities, frustrations and fear that can come with seemingly innocent suburban life."

== Covers ==
"The Suburbs" was covered by Father John Misty in 2015.

== Track listing ==
All tracks are written by Arcade Fire.

No.	Title	Length
1.	"The Suburbs"	5:14

No.	Title	Length
1.	"Month of May"	3:50

== Charts ==
Chart (2011)	Peak position
Belgium (Ultratop 50 Flanders)	60
Belgium (Ultratop 50 Wallonia)	65
Canada Hot 100 (Billboard)	94
Canada Rock (Billboard)	40
US Adult Alternative Airplay (Billboard)	26

== Certifications ==
Region	Certification	Certified units/sales
New Zealand (RMNZ) "The Suburbs"	Gold	15,000^{‡}
United Kingdom (BPI) "The Suburbs"	Silver	200,000^{‡}
^{‡} Sales+streaming figures based on certification alone.
