= Her (score) =

2021 film score by Arcade Fire and Owen Pallett

Her (Original Score)

Film score by Arcade Fire and Owen Pallett
- Released: March 19, 2021
- Length: 39:59
- Label: Milan
- Producer: Arcade Fire; Owen Pallett

Arcade Fire chronology
Everything Now (2017)	Her (Original Score) (2021)	We (2022)

Owen Pallett chronology
Island (2020)	Her (Original Score) (2021)	Dream Scenario (Original Motion Picture Score) (2023)

Her (Original Score) is the film score composed by Arcade Fire and Owen Pallett for the 2013 film Her, directed by Spike Jonze and starring Joaquin Phoenix and Scarlett Johansson. The score was not officially released to the public until March 2021.

It was nominated for Best Original Score at the 86th Academy Awards.

== Background ==
The score for the film was credited to Arcade Fire, with additional music by Owen Pallett. Arcade Fire's Will Butler and Pallett were the major contributors. At the 86th Academy Awards, the score was nominated for Best Original Score. In addition to the score, Arcade Fire also wrote the song "Supersymmetry" for the film, which also appears on their album Reflektor. The melody for the song from the same album, called "Porno", can also be heard during the soundtrack. Yeah Yeah Yeahs frontwoman Karen O recorded the song "The Moon Song", a duet with Vampire Weekend frontman Ezra Koenig, which was nominated for an Academy Award for Best Original Song.

== Release ==
Initially, the soundtrack had not been released to the general public in either digital or physical form. A 13-track score appeared for streaming on the website 8tracks.com in January 2014, before being taken down. Warner Bros. Pictures, the film's distributor, provided no official statement on the absence of an official release of the score. Earlier in 2013, Warner Bros. sent promotional CDs of the score and "The Moon Song" to critics for review. Copies of the promotional CDs later ended up on online auction websites. The score was ultimately made available through unofficial YouTube streams and illegal downloads.

During an "Ask Me Anything" (AMA) on Reddit on June 17, 2016, Will Butler mentioned the possibility of a future vinyl release. Finally, on February 10, 2021, Arcade Fire announced that the score would be available for the first time digitally, on white-colored vinyl, and on cassette on March 19, 2021, by Milan Records.

== Critical reception ==
Professional ratings
Review scores
Source	Rating
Consequence of Sound	A
Exclaim!	8/10

Michael Roffman of Consequence of Sound gave the score an "A" rating, calling it "a strikingly human and organic collection of music that keeps the film grounded in reality." Alex Hudson of Exclaim! called the score "proof that [Arcade Fire] can craft an emotional payoff with minimalism rather than the usual pomp."

=== Accolades ===
List of accolades for the Her score
Award	Date of ceremony	Category	Recipient(s)	Result	Ref(s)
Academy Awards	March 2, 2014	Best Original Score	William Butler and Owen Pallett	Nominated	
Alliance of Women Film Journalists	December 19, 2013	Best Music or Score	Arcade Fire	Nominated	
Austin Film Critics Association	December 17, 2013	Best Score	Arcade Fire	Won	
Chicago Film Critics Association	December 16, 2013	Best Original Score	Arcade Fire	Won	
Critics' Choice Awards	January 16, 2014	Best Score	Arcade Fire	Nominated	
Los Angeles Film Critics Association	December 8, 2013	Best Score	Arcade Fire, and Owen Pallett	Runner-up	
San Diego Film Critics Society	December 11, 2013	Best Score	Arcade Fire	Won	
Satellite Awards	February 23, 2014	Best Original Score	Arcade Fire	Nominated	
St. Louis Film Critics Association	December 16, 2013	Best Musical Score	Arcade Fire	Won	
Washington D.C. Area Film Critics Association	December 9, 2013	Best Original Score	Arcade Fire	Nominated	

== Track listing ==
All tracks are written by Arcade Fire and Owen Pallett

Her (Original Score) track listing
No.	Title	Length
1.	"Sleepwalker"	3:14
2.	"Milk & Honey #1"	1:27
3.	"Loneliness #3 (Night Talking)"	3:25
4.	"Divorce Papers"	3:14
5.	"Morning Talk / Supersymmetry"	4:13
6.	"Some Other Place"	3:38
7.	"Song on the Beach"	3:35
8.	"Loneliness #4 (Other People's Letters)"	0:59
9.	"Owl"	2:20
10.	"Photograph"	2:25
11.	"Milk & Honey #2"	3:19
12.	"We're All Leaving"	2:31
13.	"Dimensions"	5:39
Total length:		39:59

Notes

- "Milk & Honey #1" was titled "Milk & Honey" on the promotional release.
- "Milk & Honey #2" was titled "Milk & Honey (Alan Watts & 641)" on the promotional release.

== Charts ==
Chart performance for Her
Chart (2021)	Peak position
Austrian Albums (Ö3 Austria)	72
Belgian Albums (Ultratop Flanders)	130
Belgian Albums (Ultratop Wallonia)	54
German Albums (Offizielle Top 100)	14
Portuguese Albums (AFP)	23
Scottish Albums (OCC)	12
UK Albums (OCC)	95
