= Arcade Fire =

Canadian indie rock band

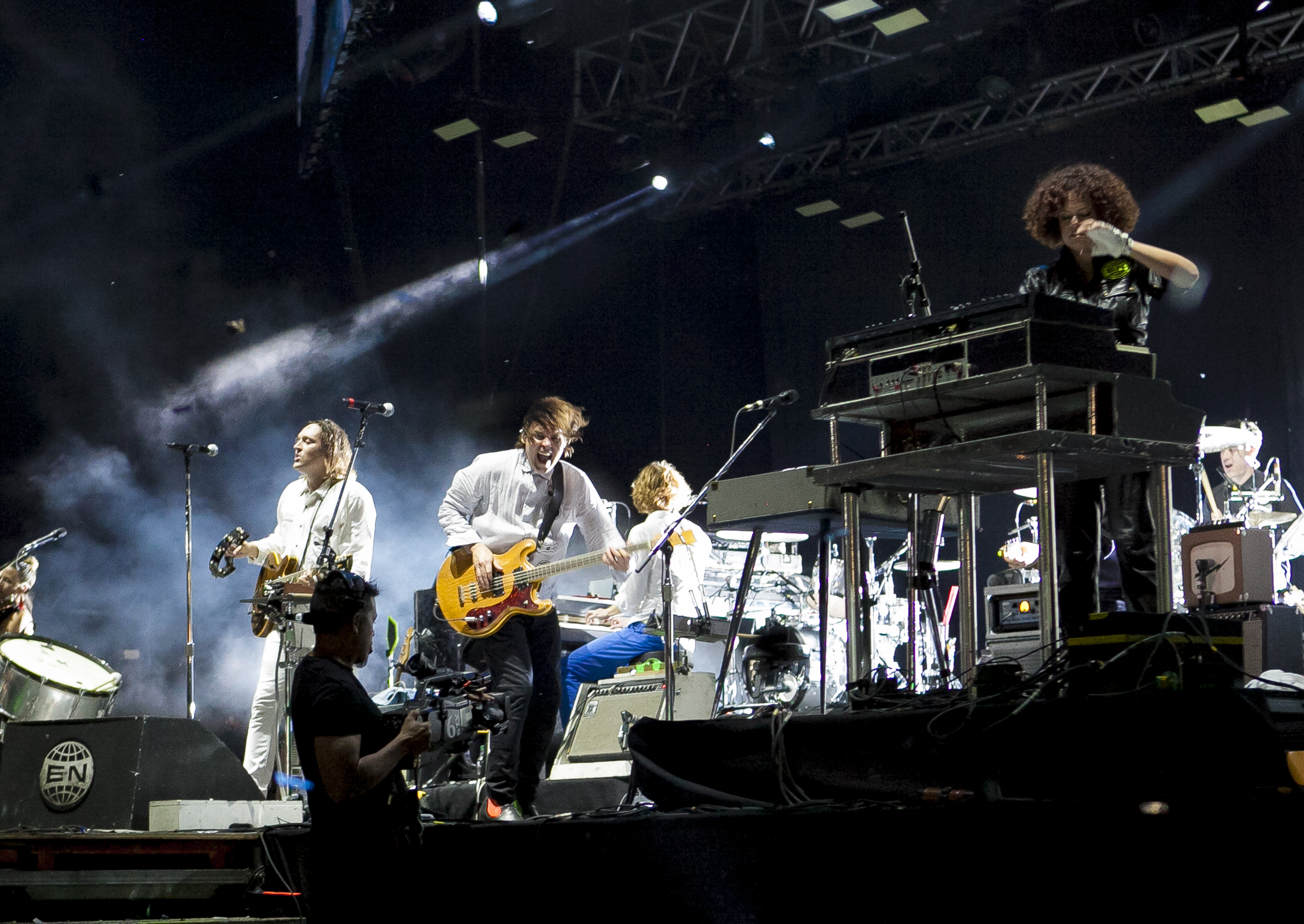
- Arcade Fire performing in 2017

Background information
- Origin: Montreal, Quebec, Canada
- Genres: Indie rock; art rock; dance-rock; baroque pop
- Works: Arcade Fire discography
- Years active: 2001–present
- Labels: Sonovox; Columbia; Merge; DFA; Rough Trade; City Slang; Spunk; Mercury; Virgin EMI
- Members: Win Butler; Régine Chassagne; Richard Reed Parry; Tim Kingsbury; Jeremy Gara
- Past members: Josh Deu; Adam Etinson; Myles Broscoe; Brendan Reed; Dane Mills; Tim Kile; Howard Bilerman; Sarah Neufeld; Will Butler
- Website: arcadefire.com

Arcade Fire is a Canadian indie rock band from Montreal, Quebec. The band consists of multi-instrumentalists Win Butler, Régine Chassagne, Richard Reed Parry, Tim Kingsbury, and Jeremy Gara. The band's touring line-up includes former core member Sarah Neufeld and multi-instrumentalists Paul Beaubrun and Dan Boeckner. Most of the band's studio albums feature contributions from composer and violinist Owen Pallett, who has also served as a touring member.

Founded in 2001 by friends and classmates Win Butler and Josh Deu, the band came to prominence in 2004 with the release of their critically acclaimed debut album, Funeral. Their second studio album, Neon Bible, won them the 2008 Meteor Music Award for Best International Album and the 2008 Juno Award for Alternative Album of the Year. Their third studio album, The Suburbs, was released in 2010 to critical acclaim and commercial success. It received many accolades, including the 2011 Grammy for Album of the Year, the 2011 Juno Award for Album of the Year and the 2011 Brit Award for Best International Album. In 2013, Arcade Fire released their fourth album, Reflektor, and scored the feature film Her, for which Pallett and then-member Will Butler were nominated in the Best Original Score category at the 86th Academy Awards. In 2017, the band released their fifth studio album, Everything Now. Their sixth studio album, We, was released in 2022, followed by their latest and seventh studio album, Pink Elephant, in 2025.

All the band's studio albums from Funeral to We have received nominations for Best Alternative Music Album at the Grammys. Funeral is widely considered by music critics to be one of the greatest albums of the 2000s. The band's work has also been named three times as a shortlist nominee for the Polaris Music Prize: in 2007 for Neon Bible, in 2011 for The Suburbs and in 2014 for Reflektor.

The band has been described as indie rock, art rock, dance-rock, and baroque pop. They play guitar, drums, bass guitar, piano, violin, viola, cello, double bass, xylophone, glockenspiel, keyboard, synthesizer, French horn, accordion, harp, mandolin and hurdy-gurdy, and take most of these instruments on tour; the multi-instrumentalist band members switch duties throughout shows.

== History ==
=== 2001–2003: Formation and early work ===
Win Butler and Josh Deu founded Arcade Fire in Montreal around 2001, having first met at Phillips Exeter Academy as high school students. Butler and Deu's musical ideas began to develop and the first incarnation of the band was born while they were attending McGill University and Concordia University, respectively. The duo began rehearsing their material at McGill where they met Régine Chassagne, a music student whom they asked to join them. Deu recalls, "Win and I played guitar. Everyone played guitar. We had no music to show her, but she ended up saying yes to joining us, and I don't know why. Maybe there was a little spark with Win." Halfway through 2001, the band consisted of Butler, Chassagne, Deu, multi-instrumentalist Tim Kile (later of Wild Light), bassist Myles Broscoe (later of Les Angles Morts, Crystal Clyffs, and AIDS Wolf), guitarist/drummer Dane Mills (later of Crackpot) and multi-instrumentalist Brendan Reed (later of Les Angles Morts and founding member of Clues), who lived with Butler and Chassagne in Montreal's Mile End neighbourhood at the time and was a collaborator with them on song-writing and arrangement (2001–2003). During a party in 2001, the band recorded a live Christmas album, A Very Arcade Xmas, which they are rumoured to have hand-distributed to their friends as a Christmas gift.

The initial Montreal structure of the band began to dissolve in the summer of 2002, when they travelled to Butler's family farm on Mount Desert Island, Maine to record their self-titled EP. Tension between Butler and bassist Myles Broscoe led the latter to exit the band following the recording session. Richard Reed Parry, who had been enlisted to help the band record, began to collaborate with them during the sessions and would go on to join the band shortly afterwards. Around the same time, Joshua Deu left the band to resume his studies; he continued to collaborate on the visual aspects of the band. In the winter of 2003, the band celebrated the release of its EP with a show at Montreal's Casa del Popolo. Before a crowd packed beyond capacity, the band's set ended (in the middle of an encore) with an argument between Butler and Reed, in which Reed quit the band on-stage. Mills told gathered friends in the crowd immediately thereafter that he considered the band to have broken up, as such resigning from the band as well. Following the on-stage implosion, Butler's brother Will Butler (subject of the early Arcade Fire song "William Pierce Butler") and Tim Kingsbury were brought in to replace Reed and Mills so that the band could continue, and they set out to promote the self-titled EP. The eponymous release (often referred to by fans as the Us Kids Know EP) was sold at early shows. After the band achieved fame, the EP was subsequently remastered and given a full release.

Howard Bilerman joined the band on drums in the summer of 2003, and they began to play shows together, and record the album that would end up becoming Funeral. The promise shown by the new band in their early live shows allowed them to land a record contract with the independent record label, Merge Records, before the end of their first year together.

When asked about the rumour that the band's name refers to a fire in an arcade, Win Butler replied: "It's not a rumour. It's based on a story that someone told me. It's not an actual event, but one that I took to be real. I would say that it's probably something that the kid made up, but at the time I believed him."

Influences on Arcade Fire included David Bowie, Talking Heads, Bruce Springsteen, Roxy Music, Radiohead, and U2. Both the band and their longtime orchestral arranger, Owen Pallett, have drawn inspiration from Orchestral Manoeuvres in the Dark's album Dazzle Ships (1983).

=== 2004–2006: Funeral ===
Funeral was released in September 2004 in Canada and February 2005 in Great Britain. The title of the debut album referred to the deaths of several relatives of band members (prominently the Butlers' grandfather, composer/arranger Alvino Rey) during its recording. These events created a somber atmosphere that influenced songs such as "Une année sans lumière" ("A Year Without Light"), "In the Backseat", and "Haïti", Chassagne's elegy to her homeland.

It received widespread critical acclaim and topped many year-end and decade-end lists. According to the website Metacritic, the album had the second most appearances on end-of-decade Top 10 lists, only behind Radiohead's Kid A. In the updated version of Rolling Stone's 500 Greatest Albums of All Time, it was ranked at No. 500.

The album was critically acclaimed and commercially successful. It appeared on many top ten album lists for 2004 and 2005 (due to delayed international releases), with Pitchfork, Filter, No Ripcord, and The MTV2 2005 Review crowning it the album of the year. NME named Funeral second in their list of 2005's best albums. NME also named "Rebellion (Lies)" the second best track. By November 2005, Funeral had gone gold in both Canada and the UK, and sold over half a million copies worldwide, a very large number for an independent release with minimal television or radio exposure. The album became Merge Records' first in the Billboard 200 chart and the label's biggest selling album to date, surpassing Neutral Milk Hotel's In the Aeroplane Over the Sea.

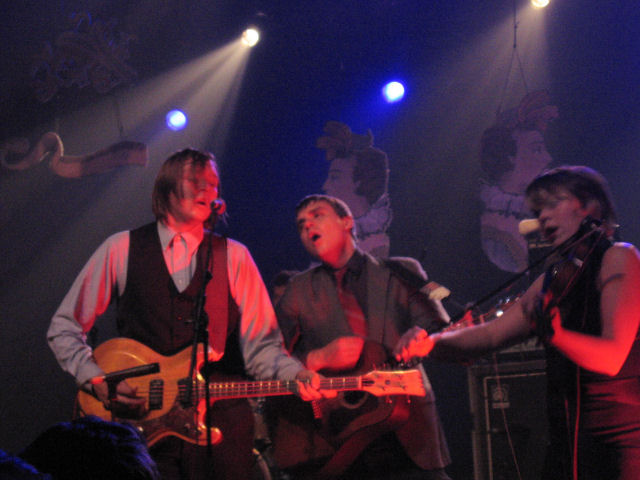
Arcade Fire performing in May 2005

The band booked small clubs for their 2004 tour, but growing interest forced many venue changes, far beyond the band's expectations, and the tour continued into mid-2005 throughout the United States, Canada, Europe, the SummerSonic Festival in Japan, and the Hillside Festival in Guelph. Taking much of the summer of 2005 off, the band made key festival appearances at the Halifax Pop Explosion, Coachella Valley Music and Arts Festival, the Sasquatch! Music Festival, Lollapalooza, Vegoose Festival, Reading and Leeds Festival in the UK, Electric Picnic in Ireland and the Lowlands Festival in the Netherlands.

On February 1, 2005, Arcade Fire appeared on Late Night with Conan O'Brien to perform "Neighborhood #2 (Laika)". Arcade Fire was featured on the April 4, 2005, cover of Time's Canadian edition. On May 1, 2005, the band performed at the Coachella Valley Music & Arts Festival. In May 2005, the band signed a short-term publishing contract with EMI for Funeral, and in June the band released a new single, "Cold Wind", on Six Feet Under, Vol. 2: Everything Ends. The BBC used the track "Wake Up" on an advertisement for their autumn 2005 season, and the tracks "Rebellion (Lies)" and "Neighborhood #1 (Tunnels)" on adverts in January 2006. On September 9, 2005, the band appeared on the British/US television special "Fashion Rocks", on which David Bowie joined them for "Wake Up". This recording, as well as recordings of the band's collaboration on Bowie's "Life on Mars" and "Five Years", were made available on the iTunes Music Store in a virtual live EP. The same trip to New York City took them to the Late Show with David Letterman and a concert in Central Park. The Central Park show featured a surprise appearance by Bowie. On September 11, 2005, Arcade Fire appeared on the long-running BBC music series Top of the Pops, performing "Rebellion (Lies)". The band also performed to a TV audience in Paris for Canal+, and the show was later screened on the British television's Channel 4. The band scored two number one songs on MTV2 (UK) NME Chart Show, with "Neighborhood #3 (Power Out)" and a three-week run with "Wake Up". This success followed Rough Trade Records's last-minute decision to release "Wake Up" only on 7" vinyl.

"Wake Up" was played immediately before the Irish rock group U2 started their concerts on their 2005–06 Vertigo Tour; Arcade Fire subsequently opened three shows for that tour, and at the third in Montreal, Quebec, Canada, appeared on stage during U2's encore to join in a cover of Joy Division's "Love Will Tear Us Apart". Additionally, The Dan Patrick Show, a daily national sports talk show in the US, plays the song as a lead-out every Friday to signify the end of their show. The song was also heard numerous times during the Super Bowl telecast on February 5, 2010.

Funeral and the single "Cold Wind" were nominated for Grammys in the Best Alternative Rock Album and Best Song Written for a Motion Picture, Television or Other Visual Media categories (Six Feet Under, Vol. 2: Everything Ends), respectively. On April 2, 2006, in Halifax, Nova Scotia, Arcade Fire received the Juno Award for Songwriters of the Year for three songs from Funeral: "Wake Up", "Rebellion (Lies)", and "Neighborhood #3 (Power Out)". The band was nominated for three BRIT Awards: Best International Group, Best International Album, and Best International Breakthrough Act.

Arcade Fire made an appearance on the BBC show Later with Jools Holland on May 12, 2005, performing "Power Out" and "Rebellion (Lies)". On October 22, 2007, Funeral was ranked No.8 in Bob Mersereau's book The Top 100 Canadian Albums. In late 2009, Pitchfork ranked the album No.2 in their list of the top 200 albums of the 2000s, behind Radiohead's Kid A.

=== 2006–2010: Neon Bible ===
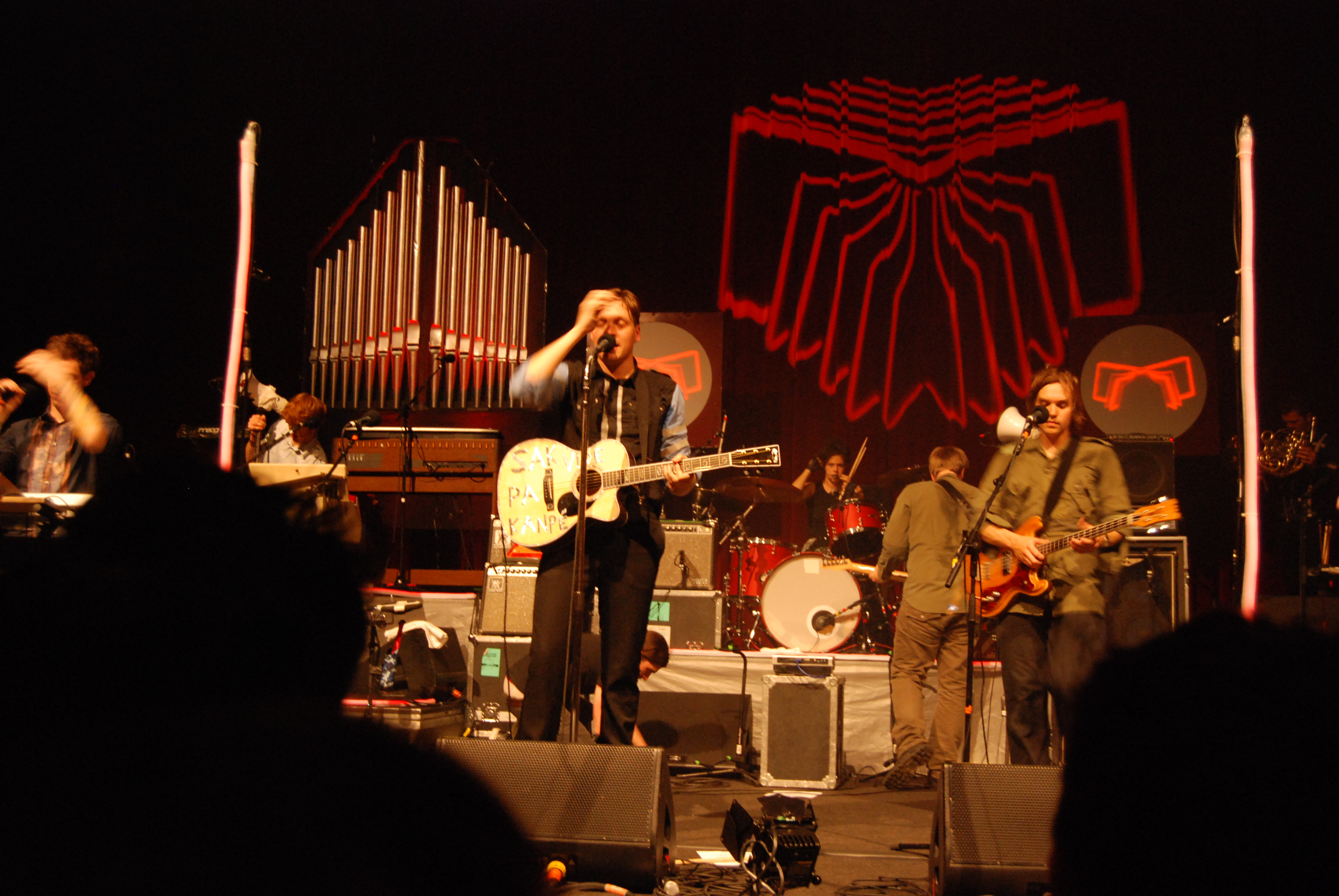
Arcade Fire performing in support of Neon Bible at the United Palace Theater on May 7, 2007

During the downtime between Funeral and the beginning of recording sessions for Neon Bible, the band purchased a defunct church in the small Quebec town of Farnham, approximately 70 kilometres (43 mi) southeast of Montreal, and spent the early part of 2006 converting it into a recording studio.

The first track officially released from Neon Bible was "Intervention" in December 2006 on iTunes. Proceeds from this release were dedicated to Partners in Health. An error resulted in a second song, "Black Wave/Bad Vibrations", appearing on iTunes for a short time. The album was leaked to peer-to-peer networks on January 26, 2007, and was officially released March 5, 2007, in the UK and March 6 in North America. Neon Bible premiered at number 1 on the Canadian Albums Chart and the Irish Album Charts, and number 2 on the US Billboard Top 200 charts and the UK Top 40 Album Chart for the week of March 12, 2007. The album was also number 1 on the Rock and Indie album charts. The first proper single, "Black Mirror", reached the No. 1 spot on CBC Radio 3's R3-30 chart for five consecutive weeks, from March 22 to April 19, 2007, and was the first single by any band ever to spend more than two weeks atop the chart. The album gained much critical acclaim (even being mooted as a strong contender for album of the year), and because of its success saw the band proclaimed the most exciting act on the earth by British music magazine Q. Paste voted it one of the five best albums of 2007. Trouser Press writer Jason Reeher ranked Neon Bible "among the best indie rock recordings of all time".

Arcade Fire made their first appearance on Saturday Night Live on February 24, 2007 (Episode 618), performing "Intervention" and "Keep the Car Running". Owen Pallett was not present as he was recording for his solo project. During the performance, one of Win Butler's guitar strings broke, prompting him to rip the strings from his acoustic guitar and smash it on the floor until it shattered. On this guitar, "sak vide pa kanpe" was written in duct tape across the front. A Haitian proverb meaning "An empty sack cannot stand up" in Creole, this may have been a reference to the extreme poverty of Haiti, the country of origin of Régine Chassagne.

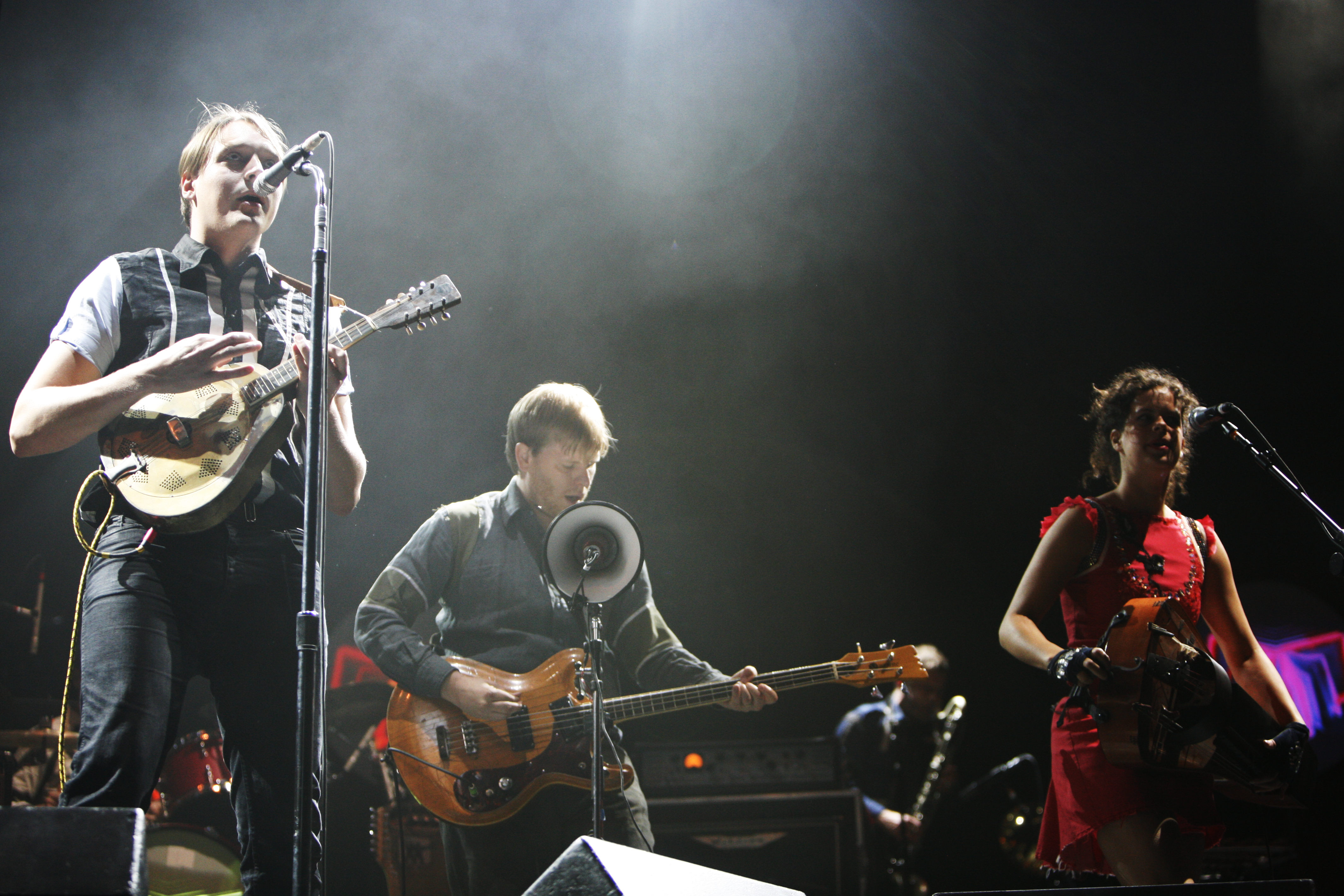
Arcade Fire in July 2007

On July 10, 2007, Neon Bible was named to the shortlist for the 2007 Polaris Music Prize. Patrick Watson was announced as the winner at a gala ceremony on September 24, 2007. However, due to the band's preference not to participate in compilation albums, they were the only nominee not to have a track on the Polaris promotional compilation 2007 Polaris Music Prize. Some media initially reported that the Polaris committee had snubbed the band by excluding them, leading the band and the committee to issue a joint press release confirming that the band chose not to have a track included on the album.

The Neon Bible tour continued into September 2007 with 25+ dates scheduled in North America and Europe through mid-November. The band toured Australia and New Zealand for the first time in early 2008 as part of the 2008 Big Day Out festival. On October 14, 2007, Win Butler and Régine Chassagne made a surprise guest appearance at a Bruce Springsteen show in Ottawa, playing "State Trooper" and "Keep the Car Running". The band committed to give Partners in Health $1.00, £1.00, or €1.00 of every ticket sold on its 2008 European and North American tours.

Arcade Fire further helped PIH, when it recorded "Lenin" on Red Hot Organization's latest album, Dark Was the Night. Sales from DWTN generated over $850,000 in money donated to AIDS related charities—$300,000 of which was given to PIH on Arcade Fire's behalf.

In February 2008, Win Butler announced on the band's journal that the Neon Bible tour had come to an end, after one year of touring and a total of 122 shows (including 33 festivals) in 75 cities and 19 countries. Critics met the self-produced Neon Bible with acclaim. Publications like NME and IGN praised the album for its grandiose nature.

Win Butler has been a vocal supporter of Barack Obama since the end of the New Hampshire Primary. Arcade Fire performed two free concerts for Obama in Cleveland and Nelsonville, Ohio on March 2 and 3, 2008, before the state's March 4 primary. The band, with Superchunk, performed another two free concerts for Obama on May 1 in Greensboro, North Carolina, and on May 2 in Carrboro, North Carolina before the state's May 6 primary. On January 21, 2009, Arcade Fire and Jay-Z were the musical guests at the Obama Campaign Staff Ball at the DC Armory, at Obama's request. Butler thanked President Obama for his stated intent to close the prison at Guantanamo Bay, and repeatedly thanked the Obama staffers for their work during the election.

The band was rumoured to be working with producer Markus Dravs on the soundtrack for the Richard Kelly film The Box. Win Butler denied the claims, but stated that he and Owen Pallett "may do an instrumental piece or two" for the film.

In December 2008, Pitchfork reported the band set up the website miroir-noir.com to foreshadow the release of a concert film with the same title, reporting, "Miroir Noir will feature live footage from the Neon Bible tour." The film was directed by Vincent Morisset. It was made available to pre-order on December 15, 2008, with the digital version available to download immediately, and the DVD shipping March 31, 2009.

A re-recorded version of the band's song "Wake Up" from their 2004 debut album, Funeral, was used for the trailer of the Spike Jonze film Where the Wild Things Are, which was released in October 2009. The song "Wake Up" has also become popular on sports radio talk shows in the US In 2009, two nationally syndicated shows—The Dan Patrick Show and The Petros and Money Show—frequently used the song as "bumper" music. The National Football League featured this recording in commercials throughout the broadcast of the 2010 Super Bowl. The band donated the proceeds from licensing the song to the NFL to the charity Partners in Health.

=== 2010–2012: The Suburbs ===
On May 27, 2010, it was announced that a new double-sided 12" single would be released the same day as the full album, called The Suburbs, on August 2 in the UK and on August 3 in the US and Canada. The album is produced by Markus Dravs, who had worked with the band on their previous album, 2007's Neon Bible, and was engineered by Marcus Paquin, who has also previously worked with the band. A track-by-track review ahead of The Suburbs release by The Quietus website said, "The progression is similar to the one William Blake takes us through in Songs of Innocence and of Experience that suggests forward momentum and maturity." The album was released with eight different covers.

The first show announced was Oxegen 2010 which took place in Ireland in July. The band announced that they would play songs from the new album in their headline performance at the Reading and Leeds Festivals in August 2010, with Win Butler noting, "We're really looking forward to playing the new songs live... [it's] like an inventor emerging from his basement after a year's work."

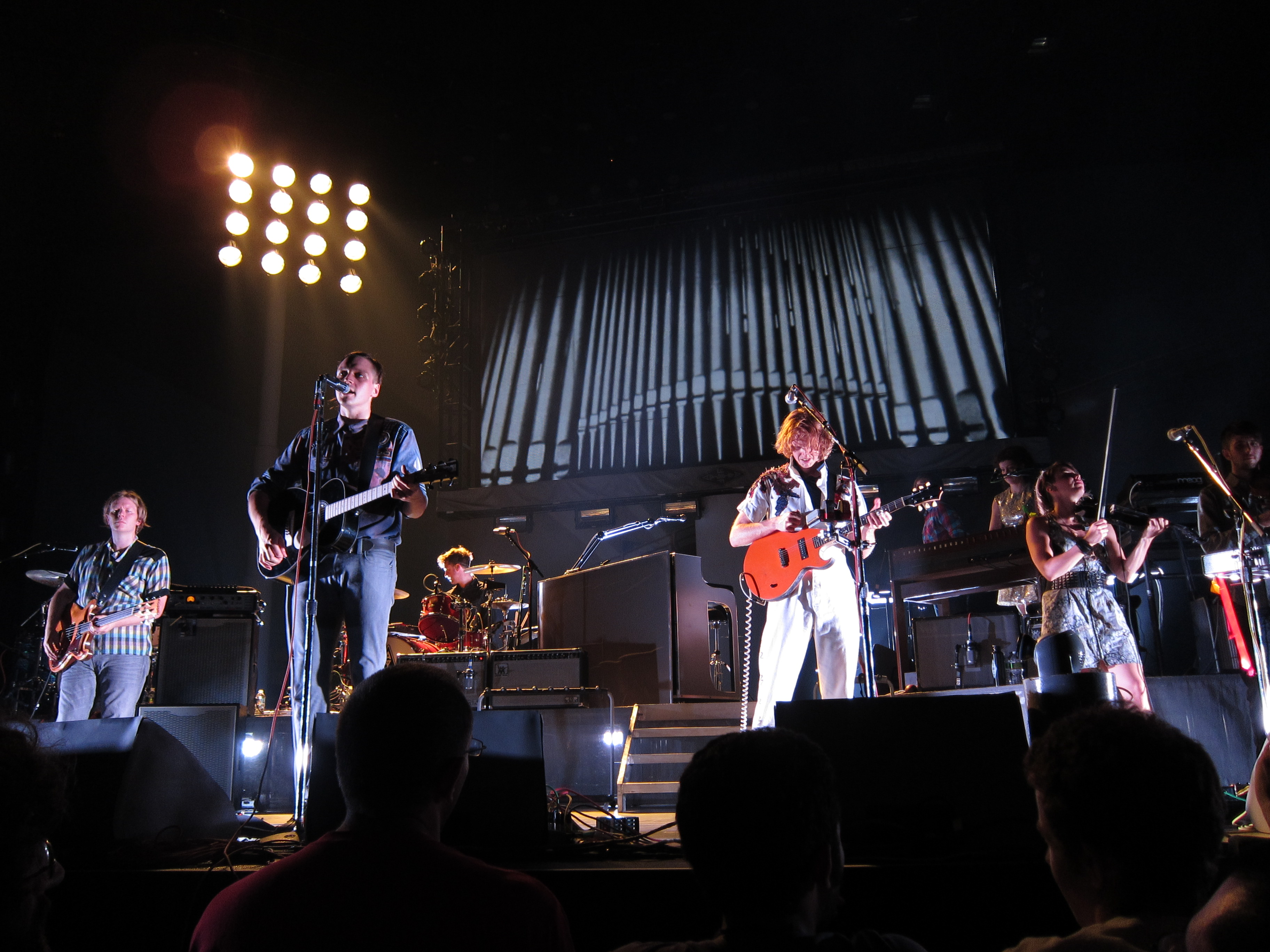
Arcade Fire performing at Madison Square Garden in August 2010

In July 2010, Arcade Fire announced they would be broadcasting their August 5 concert at Madison Square Garden live via YouTube. They later announced the video would be directed by Terry Gilliam. The Suburbs was released worldwide at the start of August 2010 to extensive critical acclaim comparable to Funeral and Neon Bible. During the 2010 tour, Arcade Fire gave a tribute to Jay Reatard performing the cover of "Oh, It's Such a Shame". Win Butler confessed to Zane Lowe that the band wanted Jay Reatard to support the band on this tour, but he had died. The Suburbs went on to debut at number one in the US (on the Billboard 200), selling 156,000 units in its first week. It was also number one in the UK and Canada.

In August 2010, Arcade Fire and Google released an interactive music video, written and directed by Chris Milk and produced by B-Reel, which allows the viewer to enter the address where they grew up and the video is then "geopersonalised". This video uses the band's song "We Used to Wait" from The Suburbs, and showcases capabilities of HTML5 and Google's Chrome browser. On November 13, 2010, Arcade Fire made their second appearance on Saturday Night Live, performing "We Used to Wait" and "Sprawl II (Mountains Beyond Mountains)".

The album debuted at No. 1 on the Irish Albums Chart, the UK Albums Chart, the US Billboard 200 chart, and the Canadian Albums Chart. It won Album of the Year at the 2011 Grammy Awards, Best International Album at the 2011 BRIT Awards, Album of the Year at the 2011 Juno Awards, and the 2011 Polaris Music Prize for best Canadian album. Two weeks after winning Grammy's Album of the Year, the album jumped from No. 52 to No. 12 on the Billboard 200, the album's highest ranking since August 2010.

In a nod to the Butlers' maternal grandfather, Alvino Rey, who was an amateur radio operator, the logo used by the band from this time was a variation of that used by the American Radio Relay League. Also, when playing the single "We Used to Wait" live, the background video screen features a radio exchange between Rey and a Canadian operator having Call Sign VE3YV. The video also features many other amateur radio artifacts.

Arcade Fire performed at the 53rd Grammy Awards in February 2011. The band was nominated for Grammy Awards in three categories: Album of the Year, Best Rock Performance by a Duo or Group with Vocal, and Best Alternative Music Album (for The Suburbs). Out of the three nominations, they won the Grammy for Album of the Year, their second time to be nominated for the award.

At the 2011 BRIT Awards, The Suburbs won Best International Album, and Arcade Fire won the Award for Best International Group.

In March 2011, Arcade Fire was honoured at the Juno Awards of 2011. They won Group of the Year and Songwriter of the Year for "Ready to Start", "Sprawl II (Mountains Beyond Mountains)", and "We Used to Wait", all off The Suburbs. The Suburbs also won Album of the Year and Alternative Album of the Year.

On April 19, 2011, it was announced that Arcade Fire would release a deluxe edition of their album The Suburbs featuring the short film Scenes from the Suburbs, by director Spike Jonze, as well as two new tracks, "Culture War" and "Speaking in Tongues" featuring David Byrne. Scenes from the Suburbs, which debuted at the Berlin International Film Festival 2011, has a running time of 30 minutes. The film screened at the SXSW Film Festival 2011 and saw its online premiere on MUBI on June 27, 2011. Writing for the Canadian Press, Nick Patch called the film "a sci-fi puzzler that seems to blend the paranoia of Terry Gilliam films with the nostalgia of classic Steven Spielberg flicks."

On June 16, the album was named as a longlisted nominee (one of 40) for the 2011 Polaris Music Prize. On July 6, the album was named as a shortlisted (one of 10) nominee for the 2011 award. On September 20, 2011, they were awarded the Polaris Prize.

On May 19, 2012, Arcade Fire (minus members Will and Tim) made their third appearance on Saturday Night Live, playing as a backup band for musical guest and host Mick Jagger. The band performed "The Last Time" with Jagger, and participated in Kristen Wiig's farewell skit, playing "She's a Rainbow" into "Ruby Tuesday". The band wore carrés rouges (red squares) to show support for the 2012 Quebec student protests.

Arcade Fire recorded a song for The Hunger Games soundtrack (The Hunger Games: Songs from District 12 and Beyond), called "Abraham's Daughter". The song is featured in the movie's end credits. The soundtrack was released on March 20, 2012, debuting at number one on the Billboard 200. It sold more than 175,000 copies in its first week according to Nielsen SoundScan. It's the first theatrical film soundtrack to top the chart since Michael Jackson's "This Is It" debuted at No. 1 on the list. It is also only the 16th soundtrack to debut at No. 1 in the history of the Billboard 200 chart (those soundtracks include film, television, and straight-to-video efforts).

Arcade Fire also contributed to the movie's original score, The Hunger Games: Original Motion Picture Score. The group composed the grand, fascistic-inspired, ominous Panem national anthem, entitled "Horn of Plenty", an important and signature leitmotif appearing throughout the film. "We were interested in making music that would be more integral in the movie, just as a mental exercise," Butler, who co-wrote the song with Chassagne, explained. "And there's an anthem that runs throughout the books, the national anthem of the fascist Capitol. So as a thought experiment, we tried to write what that might sound like. It's like the Capitol's idea of itself, basically." He further added that "it's not a pop song or anything. More of an anthem that could be playing at a big sporting event like the [Hunger] Games. So we did a structure for that, and then James Newton Howard made a movie-score version of it that happens in several places in the film." Arcade Fire's Panem national anthem has received strong reviews. According to Spin Mobile, "'Horn of Plenty' sounds both exactly like Arcade Fire and exactly like a futuristic anthem."

=== 2013–2015: Reflektor ===
"There's a lot of them, and they're mostly self-produced – like, they don't need a producer in a certain way. I think it's going to be a really great record, actually. I'm eager to see it come out."

— James Murphy, 2013

Arcade Fire and Mercury Records confirmed that they would release a fourth album in late 2013. In December 2012, the band's manager Scott Rodger confirmed that Arcade Fire was in the studio working with regular producer of the band Markus Dravs and James Murphy, frontman of LCD Soundsystem. The official Arcade Fire pre-order website set the release date on October 28, 2013. The band announced on January 18, 2013, that they were selling the church they had been using as a studio due to a collapsed roof. Throughout 2013, the band worked on the album in several different recording studios – including Murphy's DFA Records studio in New York City. On June 22, 2013, Rolling Stone reported that new material from the album would be released on September 9, 2013. On July 12, the band announced via a reply on Twitter that their new album would be released on October 29.

Whilst working on the album, Arcade Fire and Owen Pallet wrote the original score of Spike Jonze's 2013 science-fiction romance film Her. Arcade Fire also wrote the song "Supersymmetry" for the film, which would later appear on Reflektor, as well as the melody for "Porno" which can be heard on the soundtrack. Will Butler and Pallett received a nomination for Best Original Score at the 86th Academy Awards for the score. The score was not officially released to the public until 2021.

Speculation emerged in August that the album would be named Reflektor after images began circulating of street art using the name. These images were collected on an Instagram account and later uploads noted the date of September 9 and time of 9 pm. Arcade Fire confirmed their connection to the campaign with a billboard put up in New York City on August 26, 2013. A week later, the band released a 15-second music clip on Spotify titled "9pm 9/9" under the album name Reflektor.

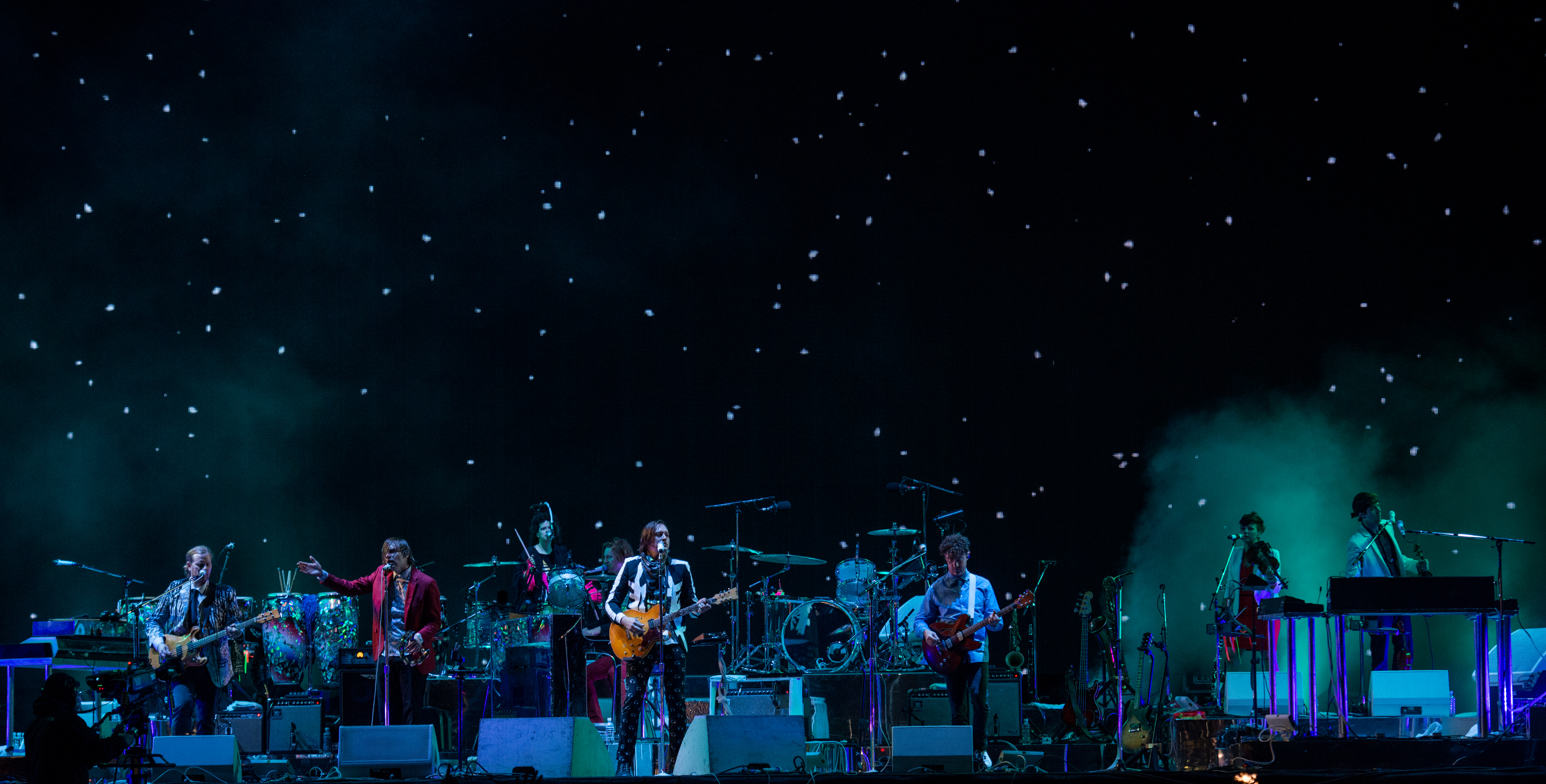
Arcade Fire performing in June 2014

English rock musician David Bowie contributed to backing vocals on the title song, "Reflektor" after praising the song's quality in fall 2013. In September 2013, Arcade Fire released a version of the 1980 hit single "Games Without Frontiers" for the Peter Gabriel tribute album And I'll Scratch Yours. Upon its release, Reflektor received positive reviews from music critics and had a successful commercial performance. The album was recognized as one of The 100 Best Albums of the Decade So Far, a list published by Pitchfork in August 2014.

Arcade Fire were the musical guest on the 39th-season premiere of Saturday Night Live on September 28, 2013. The episode drew six million viewers. They also appeared in a half-hour special on NBC, Arcade Fire in Here Comes the Night Time, that aired immediately after SNL. The special featured cameo appearances by Ben Stiller, Bono, Bill Hader, Zach Galifianakis, Rainn Wilson, Aziz Ansari, Eric Wareheim, and Michael Cera. The concert footage was filmed at the band's surprise September 9 appearance at Montreal's Club Salsathèque. Arcade Fire performed live at the YouTube Music Awards on November 3, 2013. The performance featured an experimental "live video" directed by Her writer and director Spike Jonze, and actress Greta Gerwig. The band was nominated for a Satellite Award for Best Original Score for Her. They were also nominated for a Los Angeles Film Critics Association Award for Best Music Score. The band headlined the 2014 Glastonbury Festival on June 27.

At the 2014 Juno Awards, Reflektor won Album of the Year and Alternative Album of the Year. The album was also a shortlisted nominee for the 2014 Polaris Music Prize. In 2015, Arcade Fire was the recipient of the International Achievement Award at the SOCAN Awards held in Montreal.

A documentary film about the making of the album, called The Reflektor Tapes, was released on September 24, 2015, and was shown at the 2015 Toronto Film Festival. The following day, a deluxe edition of the album containing original recordings and five unreleased songs was released. The documentary was directed by Kahlil Joseph, winner of the 2013 Sundance Grand Jury Prize for Short Films.

=== 2016–2019: Everything Now ===
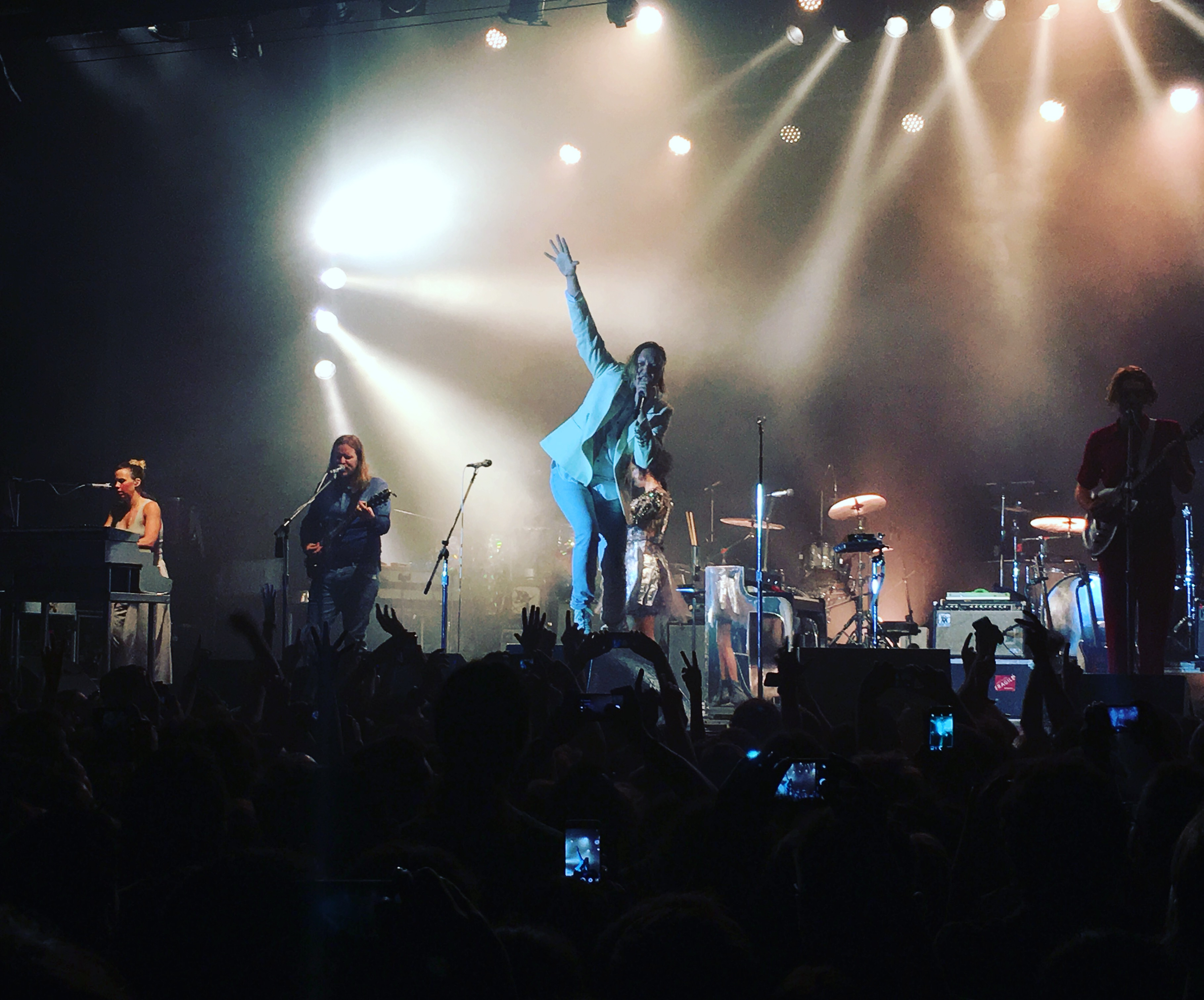
Arcade Fire in July 2016, during their first full-band show in two years in Barcelona

On May 25, 2016, Win Butler and Régine Chassagne performed a surprise set outside the Louvre which included a new song. The pair were invited by the French street artist JR to DJ at the launch of his new exhibition titled JR Au Louvre, but the two decided to set up drums and keyboards in the Tuileries gardens.

On June 17, Will Butler hosted a Reddit AMA, where he answered fan questions about the next Arcade Fire album. He stated that the new record might be released in spring 2017 and that the band had 'no definite schedule though. It'll be done when it's done.' On July 5, the band played their first complete full-band concert in two years in Barcelona, Spain as a warm up for their upcoming summer festival dates in Canada, Portugal, Spain and USA. On July 19, Tim Kingsbury told CBC that the band's upcoming fifth album would be out in 2017. On January 19, 2017, the band released a new single to coincide with Donald Trump's presidential inauguration entitled "I Give You Power". The song featured guest vocals from singer Mavis Staples. The proceeds were donated to the American Civil Liberties Union.

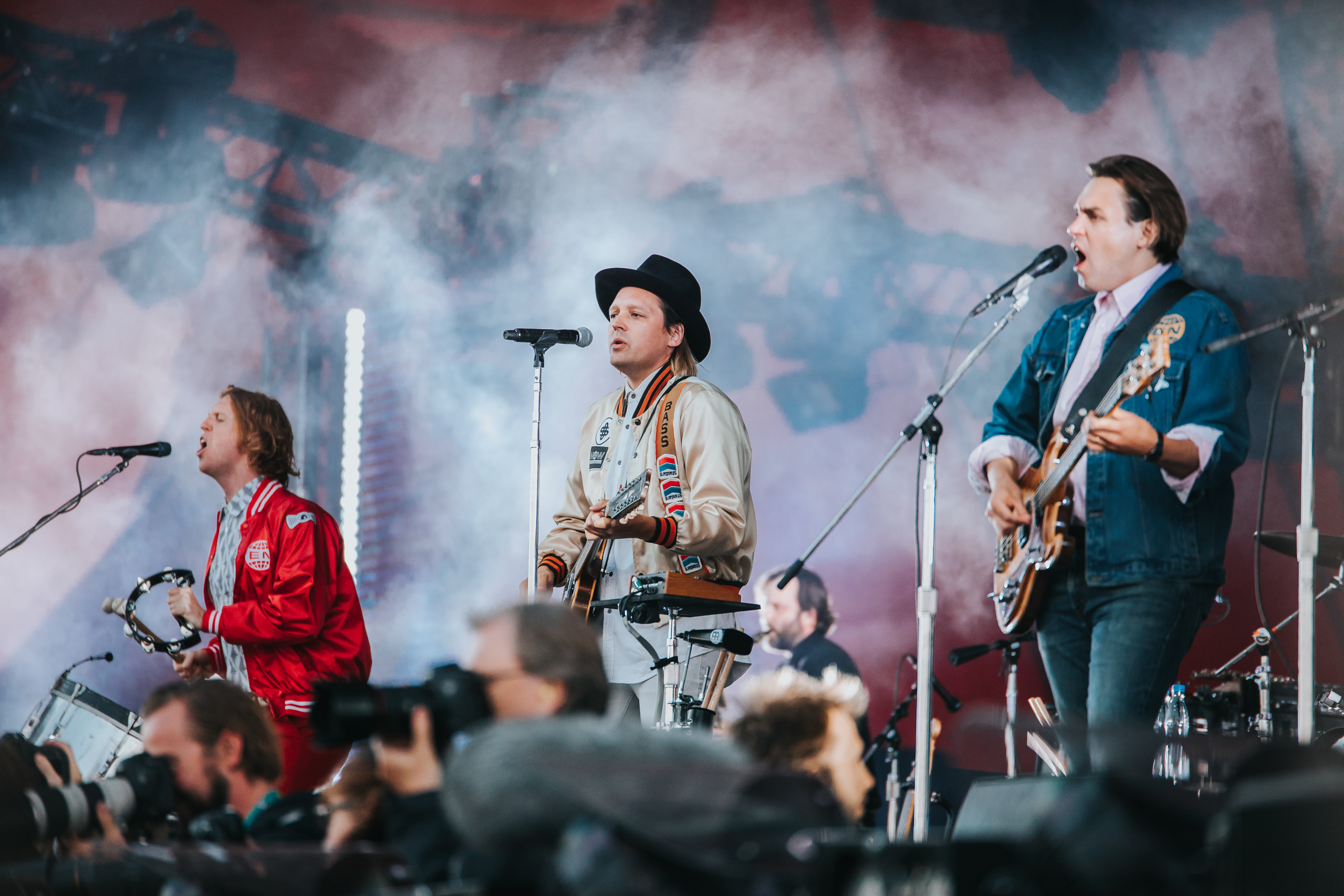
Arcade Fire performing in July 2017

Arcade Fire signed a two album recording contract with Columbia Records in May 2017. On May 31, the band released a new single "Everything Now" on a limited edition 12" vinyl at the Primavera Sound Festival in Barcelona. Arcade Fire would also perform at the festival in early June 2017. A day later, Arcade Fire announced their fifth studio album Everything Now, which was released on July 28, 2017, and released a music video for "Everything Now". In July 2017, "Everything Now" became Arcade Fire's first single to reach number one on a Billboard chart, reaching number one on the Adult Alternative Songs airplay chart. In October 2017, long-time manager Scott Rodger parted ways with the band.

After releasing two teasers on their social media pages a few days before, on March 12, 2018, the band announced a short film, directed by David Wilson called "Money + Love", containing two of their songs "Put Your Money On Me" and "We Don't Deserve Love", and being released on March 15. On March 17, Arcade Fire were featured as the musical guest on Saturday Night Live for a fifth time, performing "Creature Comfort" and "Put Your Money On Me". For the 2019 Disney film, Dumbo, Arcade Fire performs an end-credits version of "Baby Mine", by Frank Churchill and Ned Washington, which was released as a single on March 11, 2019.

=== 2020–2024: We ===
On October 21, 2020, Butler was interviewed for the Broken Record podcast, where he commented about Arcade Fire's sixth album. The band had been writing for a year before the COVID-19 lockdown. During lockdown, Butler kept working and wrote "two or three albums". In April 2020, Butler shared some snippets of new material in the social networks. On April 14, 2021, the band released a 45-minute instrumental piece, entitled "Memories of the Age of Anxiety" on the meditation application Headspace.

In March 2022, fans received postcards marked with the band's logo; the postcards included the note "We missed you", musical notations, as well as an image of an eye with the word "Unsubscribe" written below. Those same images began to appear in signage around London as well as on the band's social media pages, indicating the earliest signs of a new album. On March 14, the band announced a new song titled "The Lightning I, II" would be released on March 17. That same day, the band played a concert benefiting the Plus 1 Ukraine relief fund at the Toulouse Theatre in New Orleans, marking their first full-band performance in over two years. They also performed at Bowery Ballroom in New York City on March 18 and 19, benefitting the same organization. Tickets for all three shows were sold on a "pay what you can" basis.

On March 17, 2022, Arcade Fire announced that the album would be titled We and be released on May 6, 2022. Later that week, Will Butler announced he had amicably left the band in 2021 shortly after the completion of We.

Following the release of We on May 6, 2022, Arcade Fire announced the "WE" Tour, the group's first world tour since 2018, starting in August 2022. They again appeared on Saturday Night Live on May 7, 2022, playing "Unconditional I (Lookout Kid)", "The Lightning I, II", and "End of The Empire II" over the closing credits. They ended the Mother's Day performance with Win Butler stating "A woman's right to choose forever and ever and ever, amen."

On August 27, 2022, Win Butler was accused by four people of several instances of sexual misconduct between 2016 and 2020, including sexual assault, unwanted explicit texts, and pursuing relationships with younger fans ranging in age from 18 to 23. Butler and Chassagne denied the allegations and said all the encounters had been consensual. A few days later, Canadian artist Feist announced that she and her band would be dropping out as the opening act of the European leg of the "WE" Tour due to the allegations, having donated proceeds from the two shows she had already played to a local women's aid organization in Dublin. Beck also dropped out as the opening act of the tour's American leg later that year.

In November 2022, Arcade Fire were announced as headliners for the 2023 editions of the Kalorama festival in Lisbon and the Cala Mijas festival in Málaga. In April 2023, Arcade Fire were added to Pharrell Williams' curated festival Something in the Water, held in Virginia Beach. In June 2023, Arcade Fire was announced as a Friday headliner for Mexico City's Corona Capital festival in November. Arcade Fire earned headlining slots on 2024 festivals, including all South American Lollapalooza editions, Shaky Knees in Atlanta and Bilbao BBK Live in Bilbao, Spain.

=== 2025–present: Pink Elephant ===
In March 2025, members of Arcade Fire performed at Luck Reunion, outside of Austin, where they debuted new songs from their forthcoming album. These tracks included "Pink Elephant", "Ride or Die", and "Year of the Snake". On April 4, the band published a teaser video clip on their social media accounts, and they released a social network mobile app brand-named Trust. In the app, the band published video clips including a song "Cars and Telephones".

On April 7, 2025, at the end of the radio mix in the Trust app, Butler and Chassagne announced the new album Pink Elephant to be released on May 9.

The band played live previews of the full album on a promotional tour titled 'Don't Think About Pink Elephant'; the tour commenced with nine North American shows beginning April 22, 2025, in Mexico City, and concluded on May 14, 2025 with a one-off show in London. Prior to the first show, the band announced that Parry would be absent from the tour whilst he and his wife prepared for the birth of their first child.

On May 10, 2025, the band were the musical guests on Saturday Night Live for the seventh time in their career, performing "Year of the Snake" and "Pink Elephant" on the penultimate episode of its fiftieth season. The episode drew in 4.215 million domestic viewers. On June 9, 2025, the band were musical guests on The Tonight Show Starring Jimmy Fallon and performed "Circle of Trust".

On October 30, 2025, the band publicly announced via Instagram that members Win Butler and Régine Chassagne had decided to separate.

On February 4, 2026, the band announced Open Your Heart or Die Trying, an ambient companion album based on Pink Elephant. It was released exclusively for Record Store Day 2026 on April 18. The band described the album as "an ambient release that imagines Pink Elephant as a new sonic landscape, a score to a film that hasn't been made yet." The album was later released on digital streaming services on May 1.

== Activism ==
=== Haiti ===
Because Régine Chassagne is of Haitian descent, Arcade Fire continuously works to support Haitian people through raising awareness of the struggles this country currently faces, as well as the history, specifically the regime of François Duvalier in which 30,000 to 60,000 Haitians were murdered. This time in history is highlighted in Arcade Fire's song "Haiti".

- 2004: Arcade Fire played two hometown shows in Haiti where all profits were donated to Albert Schweitzer's hospital in Haiti.
- 2005–present: Arcade Fire has donated $1.00, £1.00, or €1.00 of every ticket sold on tour to Partners In Health + Kanpe, via Plus1.
- 2006: Proceeds from the release of track "Intervention" were dedicated to Partners in Health.
- 2009: Arcade Fire recorded "Lenin" for Red Hot Organization's "Dark Was the Night". $850,000 raised for AIDS relief; $300,000 was donated to Partners in Health.
- 2010: The NFL purchased rights to "Wake Up" for Super Bowl XLIV; all proceeds went to Partners in Health.
- AF ♥ Haiti campaign: trained 50k+ volunteers to engage fans in Partners in Health's mission.

== Members ==
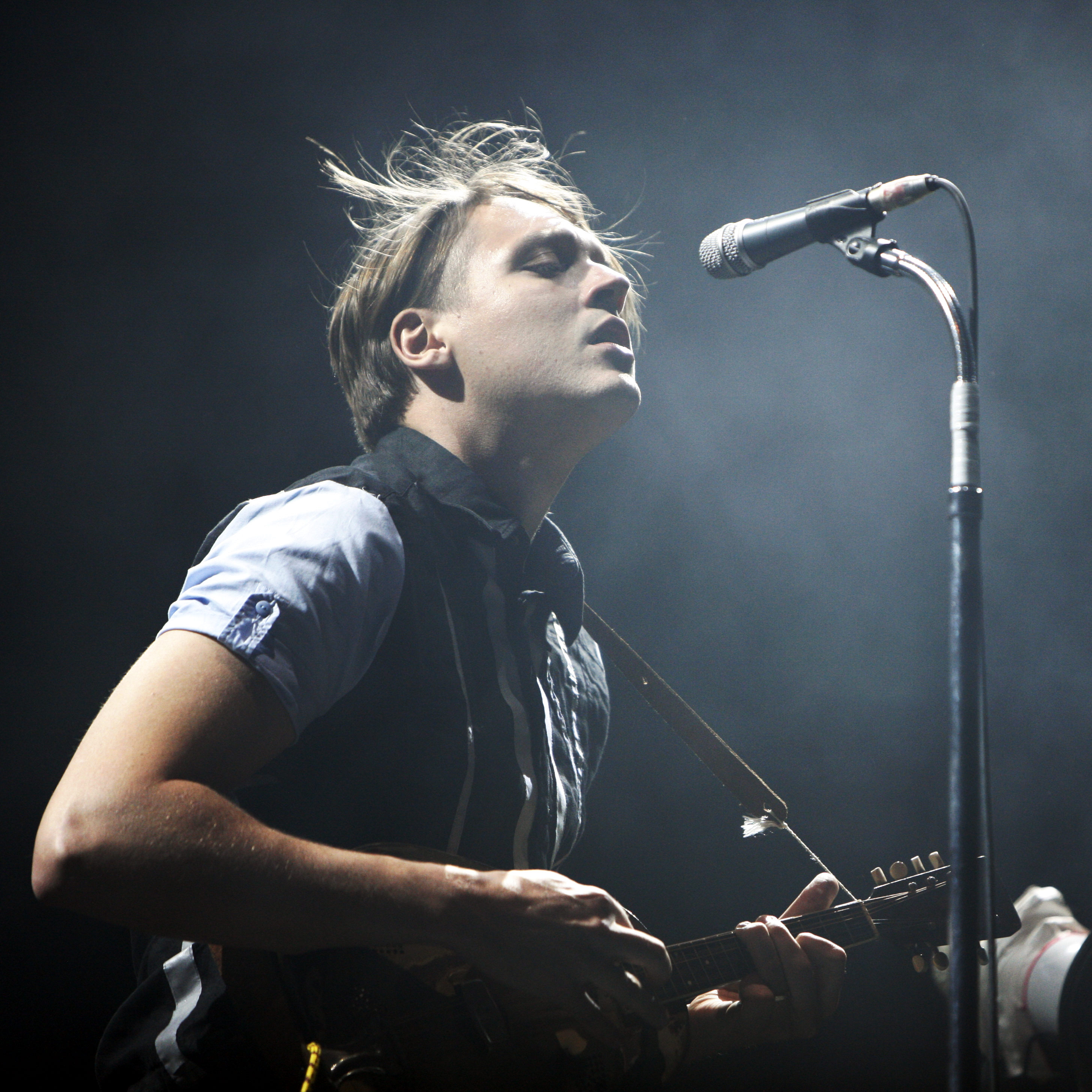
Win Butler

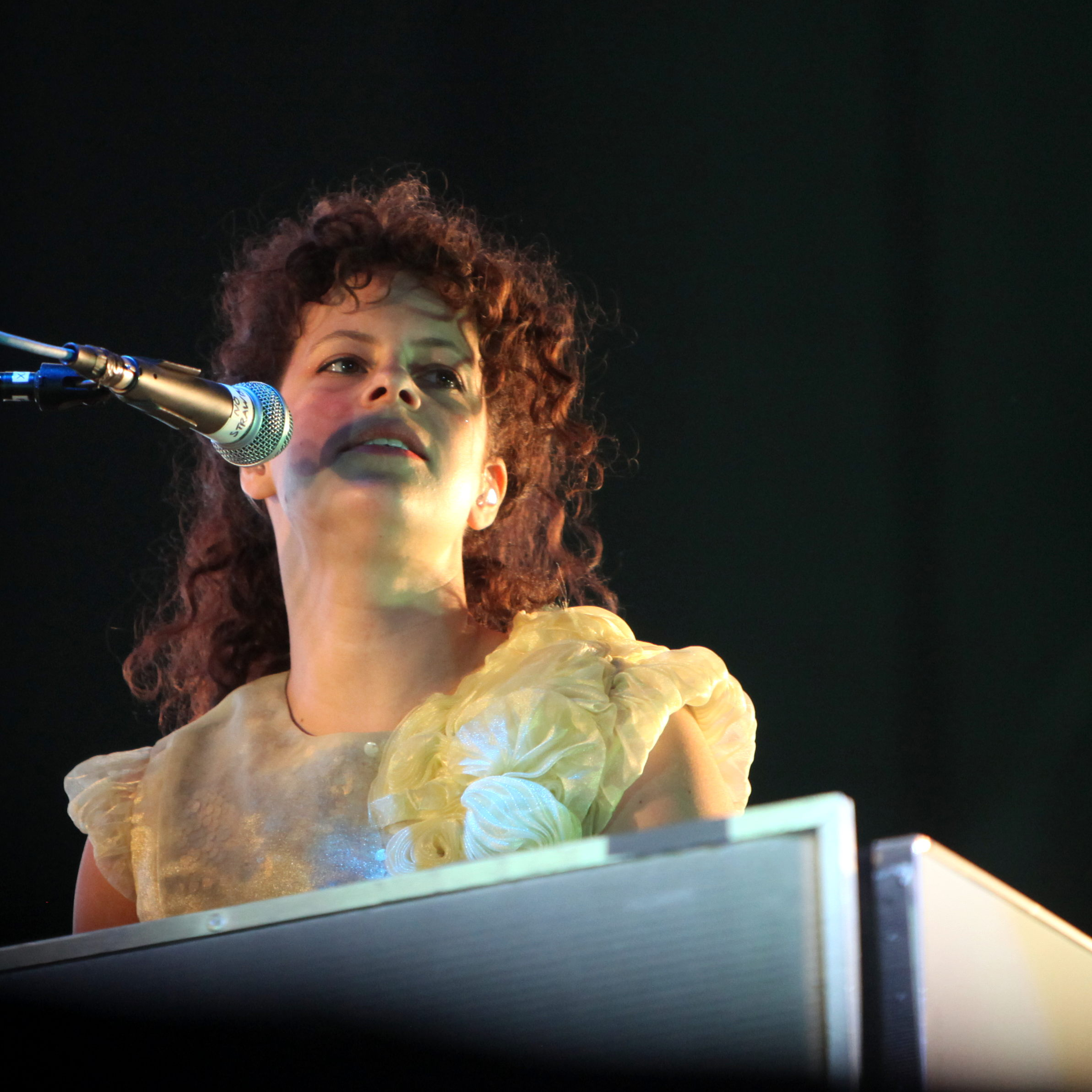
Régine Chassagne

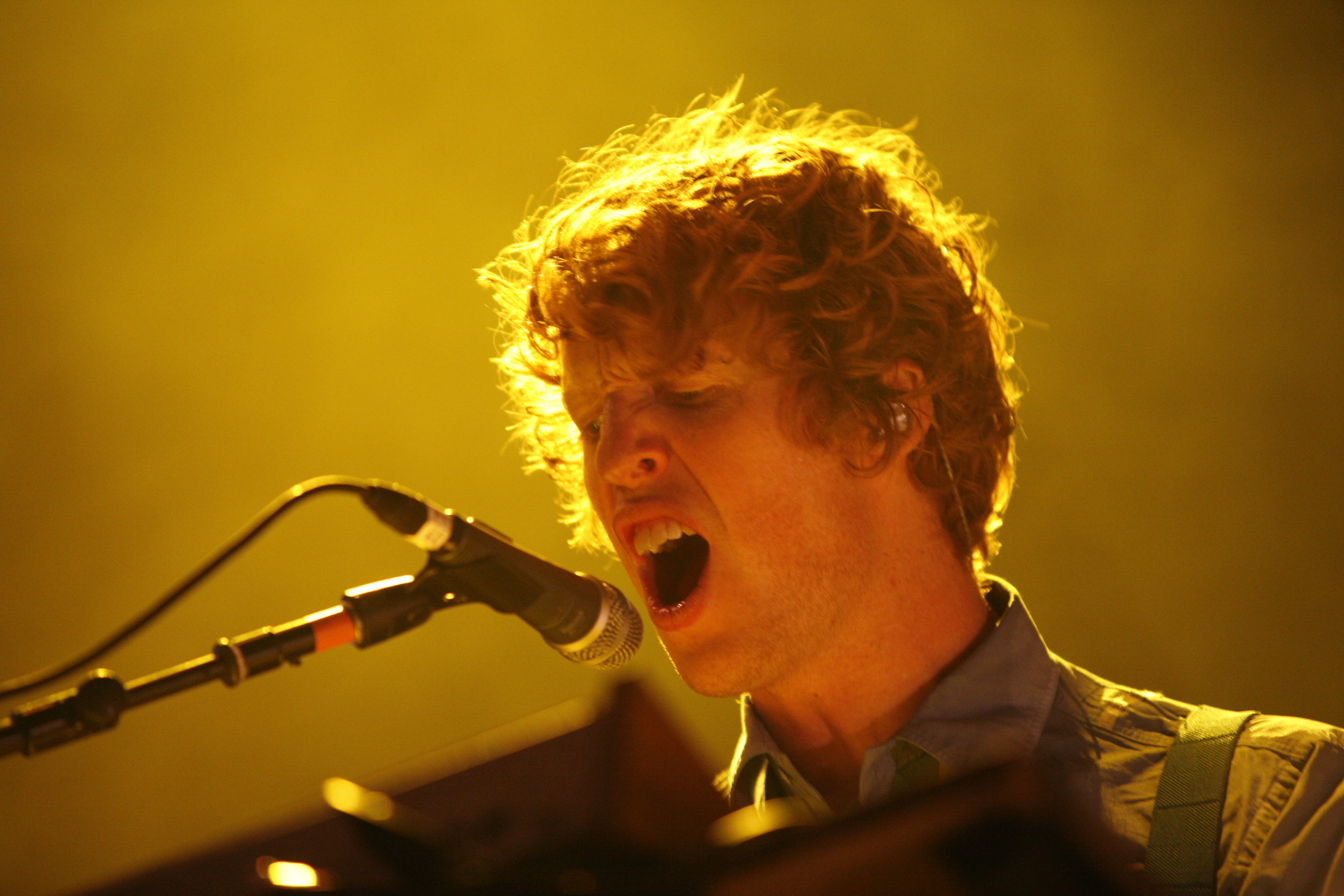
Richard Reed Parry

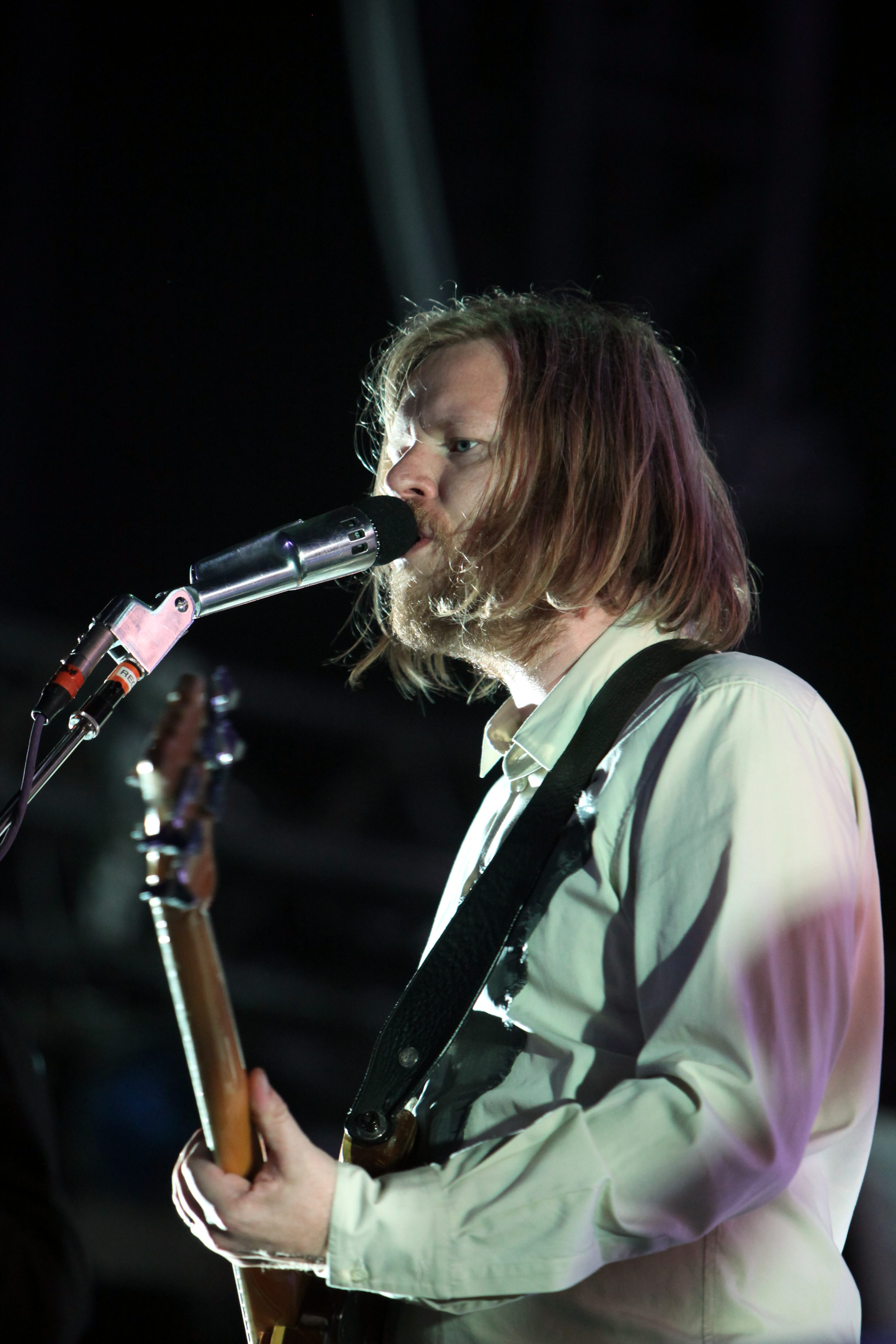
Tim Kingsbury

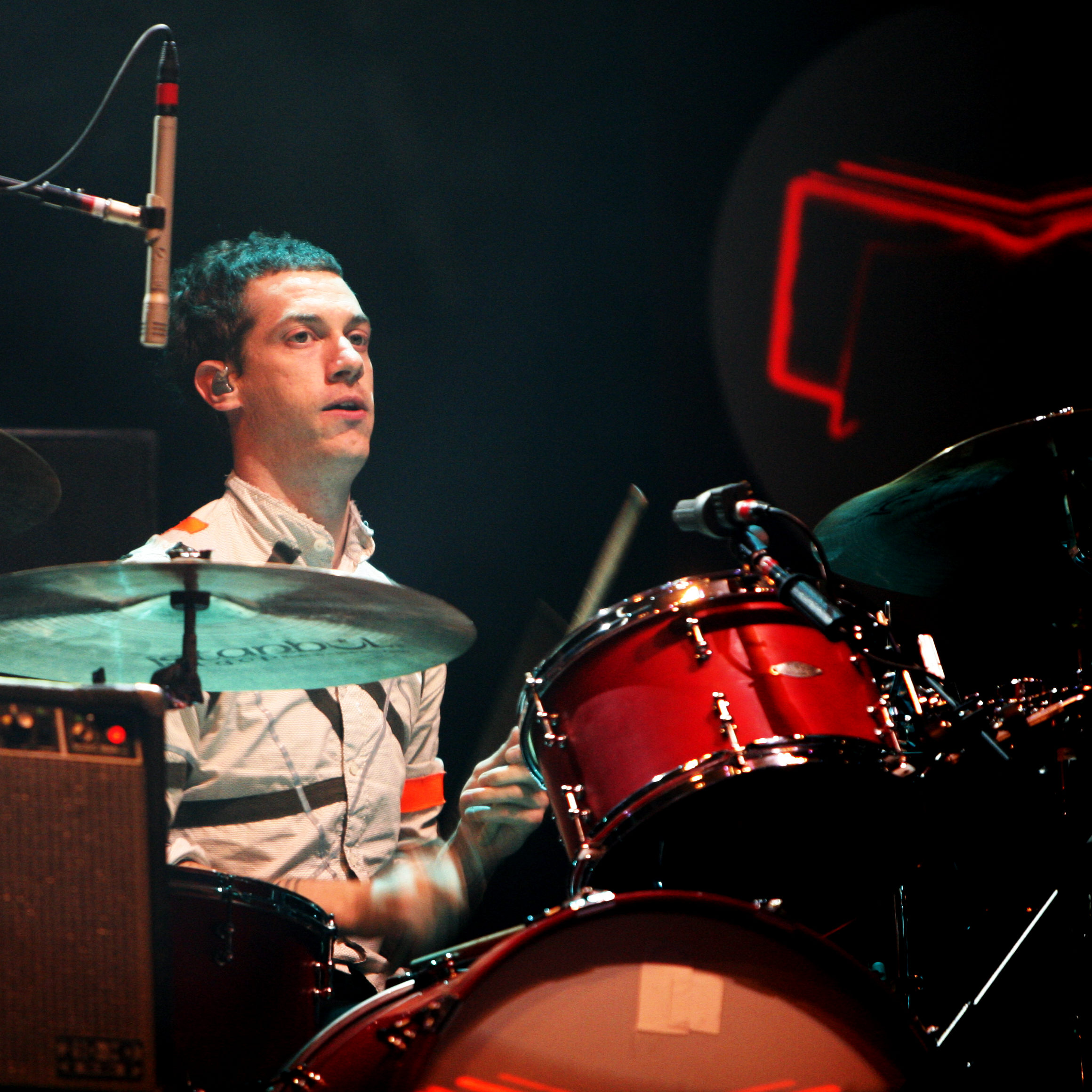
Jeremy Gara

Current members

- Win Butler – lead and backing vocals, guitar, piano, keyboards, bass guitar, mandolin (2001–present)
- Régine Chassagne – backing and lead vocals, accordion, piano, keyboards, hurdy gurdy, recorder, drums, percussion (2001–present)
- Richard Reed Parry – guitar, bass guitar, double bass, piano, keyboards, synthesizers, organ, celesta, accordion, drums, percussion, backing vocals (2003–present)
- Tim Kingsbury – bass guitar, guitar, double bass, keyboards, backing vocals (2003–present)
- Jeremy Gara – drums, percussion, guitar, keyboards, backing vocals (2004–present)

Current touring musicians

- Sarah Neufeld – violin, piano, keyboards, synthesizers, tambourine, xylophone, backing vocals (touring member 2013–present; core group member 2003–2013)
- Dan Boeckner – guitars, synthesisers, various instruments (2003; 2022–present)
- Paul Beaubrun – keyboards, guitars, congas, djembe (2022–present)

Former members

- Will Butler – synthesizers, bass guitar, guitar, percussion, sitar, panpipes, trombone, omnichord, musical saw, double bass, concertina, clarinet, gadulka, backing vocals (2003–2021)
- Josh Deu – guitar (2001–2003)
- Brendan Reed – tap dancing, drums, percussion, vocals (2001–2003)
- Dane Mills – bass guitar, drums, percussion, stomping (2001–2003)
- Tim Kile – guitar (2001–2003)
- Myles Broscoe – bass guitar (2002–2003)
- Howard Bilerman – drums, percussion, guitar (2003–2004)

Former touring musicians

- Owen Pallett – violin, keyboards, backing vocals (2004–2005, 2010–2011, 2013–2016)
- Pietro Amato – horn (2004–2005)
- Mike Olsen – cello (2004–2005)
- Colin Stetson – horns (2007–2008)
- Kelly Pratt – horn (2007–2008)
- Marika Anthony-Shaw – viola, backing vocals (2007–2011)
- Alex McMaster – cello (2011)
- Diol Edmond – percussion (2013–2016)
- Matt Bauder – saxophone and clarinet (2014–2016)
- Stuart Bogie – saxophone, clarinet, flute, keyboards (2014–2018)
- Tiwill Duprate – percussion (2013–2018)
- Eric Heigle – percussion, keyboards, accordion (2022)

Timeline

== Discography ==
Studio albums

- Funeral (2004)
- Neon Bible (2007)
- The Suburbs (2010)
- Reflektor (2013)
- Everything Now (2017)
- We (2022)
- Pink Elephant (2025)

Soundtracks

- Her (2021)

== Tours ==
- Funeral Tour (2003–2005)
- Neon Bible Tour (2007–2008)
- The Suburbs Tour (2010–2011)
- Reflektor Tour (2013–2014)
- Post-Reflektor Tour (2016)
- Infinite Content Tour (2017–2018)
- Everything Now Continued (2018)
- The "WE" Tour (2022–2024)
- Real Fun (2024)
- Don't Think About Pink Elephant Tour (2025)

== See also ==
- Canadian rock – Canadian contributions to rock music
- List of awards and nominations received by Arcade Fire
