= Win Butler =

Canadian-American musician (born 1980)

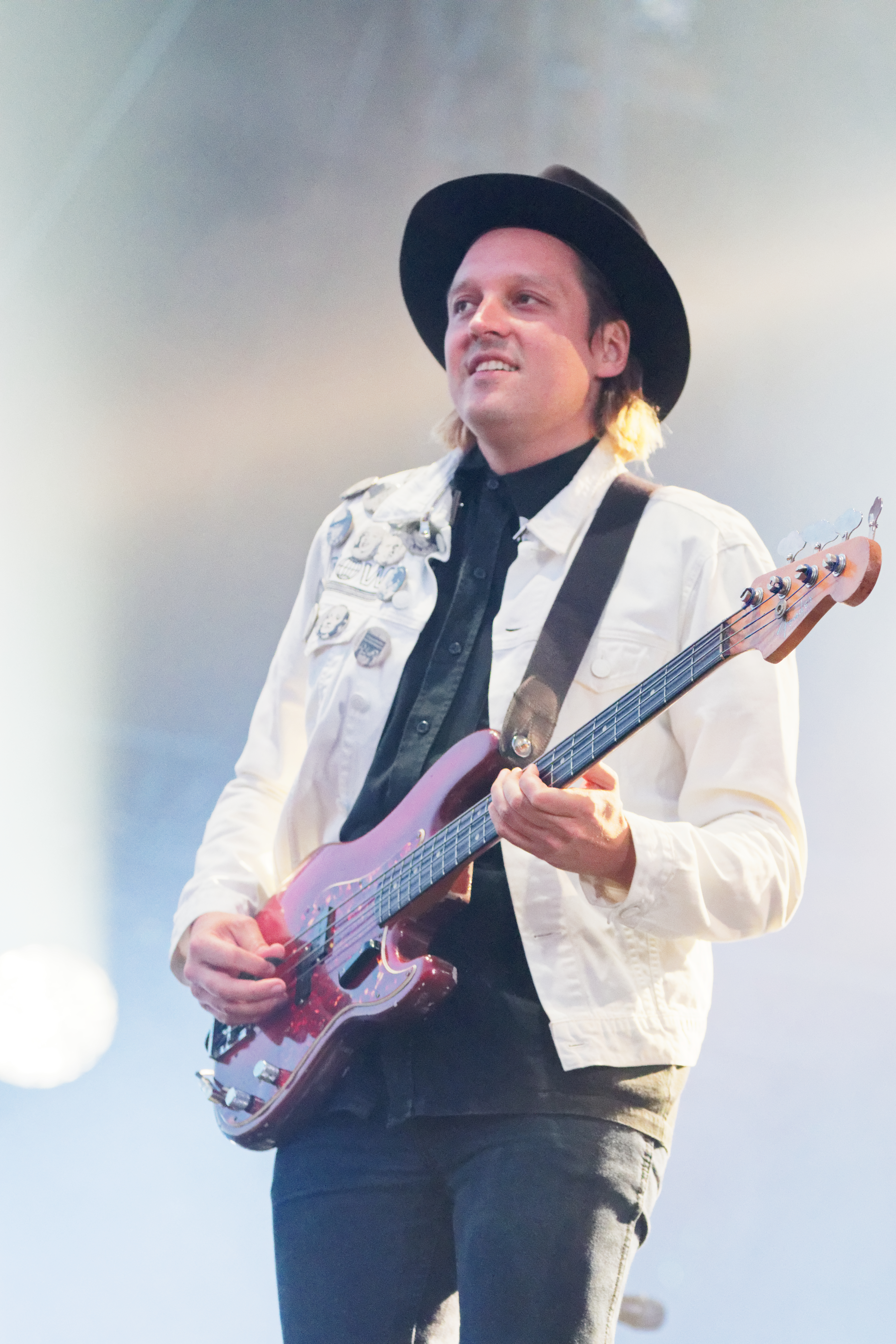
- Butler performing in 2017

Background information
- Also known as: DJ Windows 98
- Born: Edwin Farnham Butler III; April 14, 1980 (age 46); Truckee, California, U.S.
- Origin: The Woodlands, Texas, U.S. Montreal, Quebec, Canada (with Arcade Fire)
- Genres: Indie rock; art rock; dance-rock; baroque pop
- Occupations: Singer; songwriter; musician
- Instruments: Vocals; guitar; keyboards; bass; mandolin; banjo
- Years active: 2000–present
- Member of: Arcade Fire
- Spouse: Régine Chassagne (m. 2003; sep. 2025)

Edwin Farnham Butler III (born April 14, 1980) is an American-Canadian singer, songwriter, musician, and multi-instrumentalist. He co-founded the Montreal-based indie rock band Arcade Fire with Josh Deu and Régine Chassagne.

== Early life ==
Butler was born in Truckee, California, and raised in The Woodlands, Texas, with a Latter-Day Saint upbringing. He lived in Buenos Aires, Argentina, before his brother Will was born.

His father, Edwin Farnham Butler II, worked as a geologist for oil conglomerate Halliburton in Houston, Texas. His mother, Liza Rey, who performed on the family TV show, The King Family Show, plays jazz harp and sings. Butler's parents currently live on Mount Desert Island, Maine. Butler's maternal grandfather was jazz steel guitarist Alvino Rey, a pioneer bandleader whose career spanned eight decades. His maternal grandmother, Luise, was a member of The King Sisters, who starred in a weekly variety program on ABC called The King Family Show.

At the age of 15, Butler started attending the Phillips Exeter Academy preparatory school in New Hampshire, where he lived in Abbot Hall. After graduation, he studied photography and creative writing at Sarah Lawrence College, but left after a year.

== Career ==
Butler moved to Montreal, Quebec, Canada in 2000 to attend McGill University, where he met his future wife, Régine Chassagne, whom he married in 2003. Butler graduated from McGill in 2004 with a bachelor's degree in religious studies.

Butler participated in the 2005 UNICEF benefit project, "Do They Know It's Hallowe'en?", along with Chassagne. The two also collaborated on the music for the Richard Kelly film The Box.

On April 2, 2011, LCD Soundsystem played its last concert before its disbandment. Arcade Fire performed with them during the song "North American Scum". During James Murphy's stumbling introduction to the song, Butler shouted out "shut up and play the hits!" Murphy immediately responded, "ladies and gentlemen, for our live record entitled 'Shut Up and Play the Hits'" and Butler's cry later became the title of the documentary of the concert.

In September 2011, Butler played in a charity basketball tournament in Toronto, Ontario, known as "Rock The Court". Several other celebrities and athletes participated, such as Matt Bonner of the San Antonio Spurs.

Butler also works as a DJ using the stage name DJ Windows 98. Sometimes he works under this moniker as the opening act for Arcade Fire itself.

In March 2015, Butler and Chassagne attended the launch of music streaming service Tidal, and revealed themselves, along with other notable artists, as shareholders in the company.

== Personal life ==
Butler was married to fellow Arcade Fire member Régine Chassagne. They have a son, born in April 2013. The couple announced their separation in October 2025.

Butler was naturalized as a Canadian citizen on July 9, 2019, in a ceremony held in Montreal and hosted by Immigration, Refugees and Citizenship Canada minister Ahmed Hussen.

Butler is a frequent participant in the NBA All-Star Celebrity Game, and won the game's Most Valuable Player award in 2016.

=== Sexual misconduct allegations ===
According to Pitchfork articles published in 2022, five individuals have accused Butler of sexual misconduct, including one accusation of sexual assault, with some saying their initial contact with him was on social media. Butler said all contact with the accusers was consensual, and he denies all allegations of misconduct. Butler also claimed that during that period, he was struggling with his mental health, substance abuse, and depression. He said, "None of this is intended to excuse my behaviour, but I do want to give some context and share what was happening in my life around this time." Despite this, Butler and Arcade Fire found themselves being distanced by other artists. Feist was slated to tour with them in 2022, but after much consideration she decided to withdraw: "To stay on tour would symbolise I was either defending or ignoring the harm caused by Win Butler and to leave would imply I was the judge and jury," she said.
