= Régine Chassagne =

Canadian musician (born 1976)

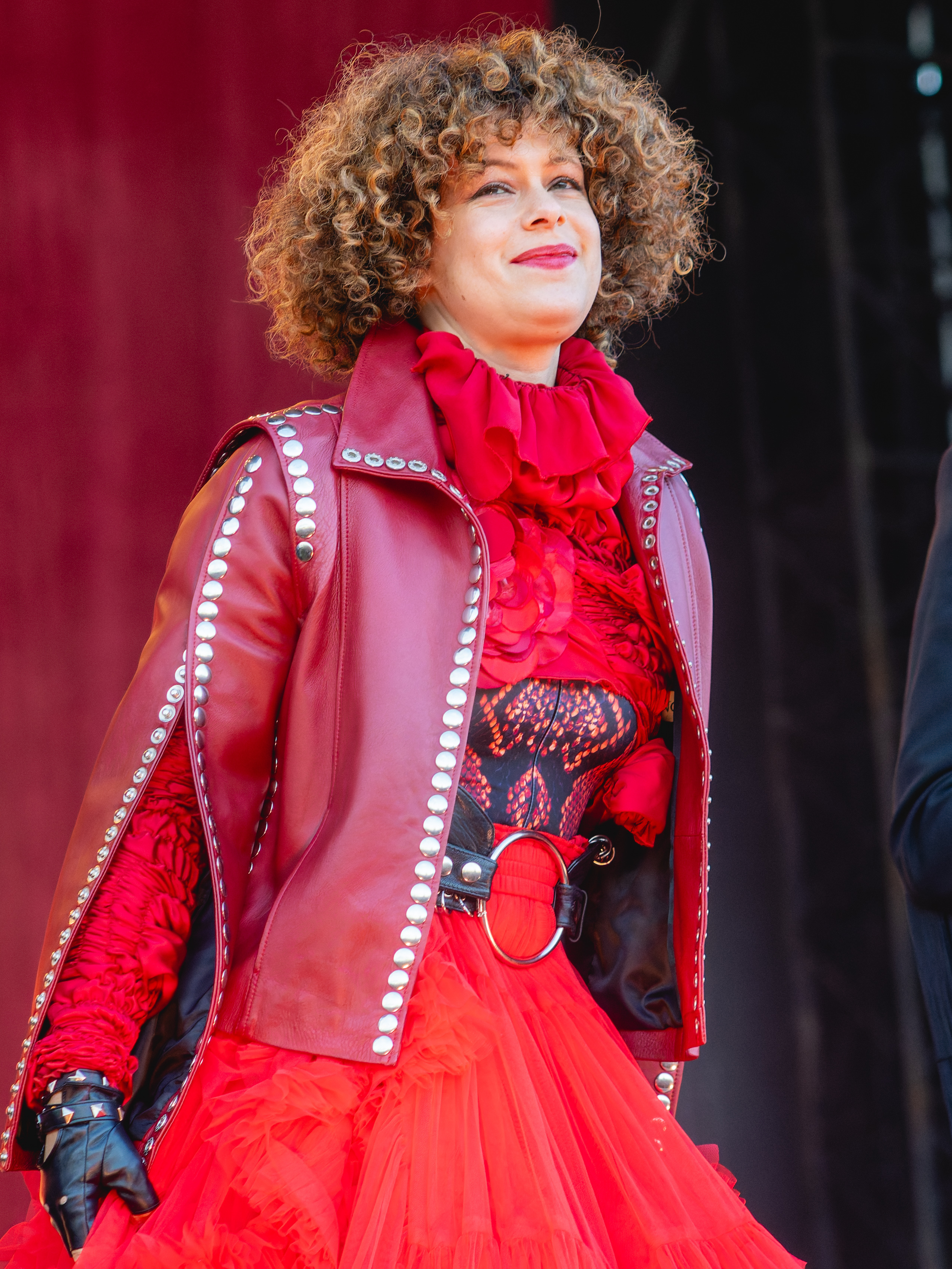
- Chassagne performing with Arcade Fire in 2024

Background information
- Born: Régine Alexandra Chassagne; 19 August 1976 (age 50); Montreal, Quebec, Canada
- Genres: Indie rock; art rock; dance-rock; baroque pop
- Occupation: Musician
- Instruments: Vocals; piano; keyboards; accordion; drums; percussion; hurdy-gurdy; recorder; guitar
- Years active: 2000–present
- Spouse: Win Butler (m. 2003; sep. 2025)

Régine Alexandra Chassagne (French pronunciation: [ʁeʒin ʃasaɲ]; born 19 August 1976) is a Canadian singer, songwriter, musician, and multi-instrumentalist, and is a member of the band Arcade Fire.

== Early life and career ==
Régine Alexandra Chassagne was born in Montreal, Quebec, Canada, and grew up in St-Lambert, a suburb south of Montreal. Her parents, who were Haitians of mixed French and African descent, moved from Haiti during the dictatorship of François Duvalier, which is alluded to in the Arcade Fire song "Haïti", in which she sings, Mes cousins jamais nés hantent les nuits de Duvalier ("My unborn cousins haunt Duvalier's nights"). The line is in reference to the relatives who were killed during the Jérémie Vespers massacre.

Chassagne attended Collège Jean-de-Brébeuf before earning a B.A. in communication studies at Concordia University in 1998, and went on to study jazz voice briefly at McGill University. She was singing jazz at an art opening at Concordia in 2000, when Win Butler met her and persuaded her to join his band.

Chassagne has also been involved with a medieval-themed band called Les Jongleurs de la Mandragore and with Jimmy Rouleau in the jazz duo Azúcar. She also wrote the music for the two-minute David Uloth short film "The Shine", and she contributed to the UNICEF benefit project as part of the North American Hallowe'en Prevention Initiative, performing the song "Do They Know It's Hallowe'en?" along with Win Butler.

She plays many instruments on stage, including accordion, drums, xylophone, hurdy-gurdy, keyboards, organ and guitar. In Arcade Fire, Chassagne performs lead vocals on multiple songs, including "I'm Sleeping in a Submarine", "The Woodlands National Anthem", "Haiti", "In the Backseat", "Black Wave/Bad Vibrations", "Empty Room", "Abraham's Daughter", "Sprawl II (Mountains Beyond Mountains)", "Creature Comfort", "Electric Blue", and "Unconditional II (Race and Religion)".

In March 2015, Chassagne, along with Win Butler, attended the launch of music streaming service Tidal, and revealed themselves, along with other notable artists, as shareholders in the company.

== Personal life ==
Chassagne married fellow Arcade Fire member Win Butler in 2003. They have a son, born in April 2013. The couple announced their separation in October 2025.
