= Pietro Amato =

French horn player

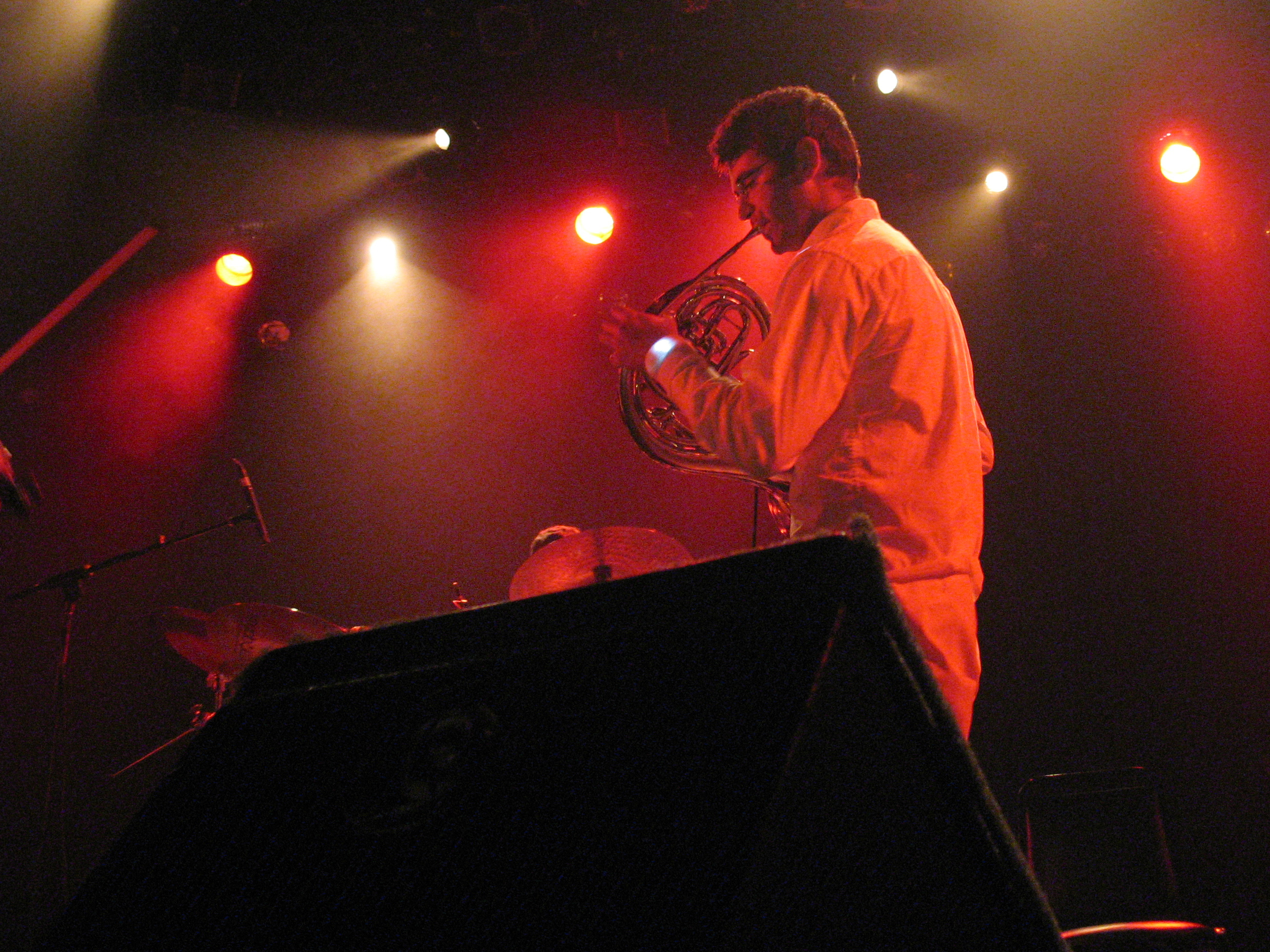
- Pietro Amato performs with Bell Orchestre in 2006.

Background information
- Genres: Pop; rock
- Occupation: Musician
- Instrument: French horn
- Member of: Torngat, Bell Orchestre, The Luyas

Pietro Amato is a French horn player with the rock bands Torngat, Bell Orchestre, and The Luyas. He has also performed with Arcade Fire.

== Career ==
In 2001, Amato, along with keyboardist Mathieu Charbonneau and percussionist Julien Poissant, formed Torngat, his longest standing musical project. The band self-released music for several years before signing with the Alien8 label.

In 2006, Amati performed with the Bell Orchestre at the Montreal Jazz Festival, and promoted the group's release Recording a Tape the Colour of the Light with a March tour in Europe and a May tour of the US. In April he toured with Torngat in Eastern Canada, promoting the album La Rouge. In July, a stand-in temporarily replaced Amato for Bell Orchestre's European tour while he participated in the recording of Torngat's 2007 album, You Could Be.

In 2007, Amato toured in March with Arcade Fire in Canada, promoting Neon Bible. Then he was on the road again with The Luyas in Ontario, to promote that band's recently released Faker Death. That year Amato and the Bell Orchestra were nominated for a Juno Award for their work in Recording a Tape the Colour of the Light.

Torngat's You Could Be was released in 2007, and late 2007 and early 2008 Amato toured with the band in Eastern Canada and New York City in support of that album.

By 2009, Torngat had released another album, La Petite Nicole; the trio conducting spring and fall tours around Canada and the U. S. to promote it. Amato also toured in April, May and July with Bell Orchestre in Canada and parts of the US to promote their release As Seen Through Windows, which won best instrumental album at the Juno Awards in 2010.

In 2011, Amato was on the road again with The Luyas from March to May promoting Too Beautiful to Work, touring in Canada and the US before moving on to Europe.

In 2023, Amato produced the soundtrack of the biographical drama film The Iron Claw by Sean Durkin.

== Discography ==
=== Studio albums ===
Torngat

- Torngat (2002)
- Live at The Bread Factory (2004)
- La Rouge (2005)
- You Could Be (2007)
- La Petite Nicole (2009)

Bell Orchestre

- Recording a Tape the Colour of the Light (2005)
- Who Designs Nature's How (2009) EP
- As Seen Through Windows (2009)

The Luyas

- Faker Death (2007)
- Tiny Head (2009) self-released EP
- Too Beautiful to Work (2011)

=== Studio Sessions ===
Islands - Return to the Sea (2006)

Evalyn Parry - Small Theatres (2007)

Amon Tobin - Foley Room (2007)

Sevens Project - Sevens Project (2010)

Ferriswheel - Woodsongs from the Backroom (2010)

Plants and Animals - La La Land (2010)

Snailhouse

- Lies on the Prize (2008)
- Monumental Moments (2010)

Arcade Fire

- Funeral (2004)
- Neon Bible (2007)
- The Suburbs (2010)

Belgrave

- Belgrave (2011)

Paper Beat Scissors

- Paper Beat Scissors (2012)

Tambour - Farewell Museum (2016)
