= Sarah Neufeld =

Canadian violinist

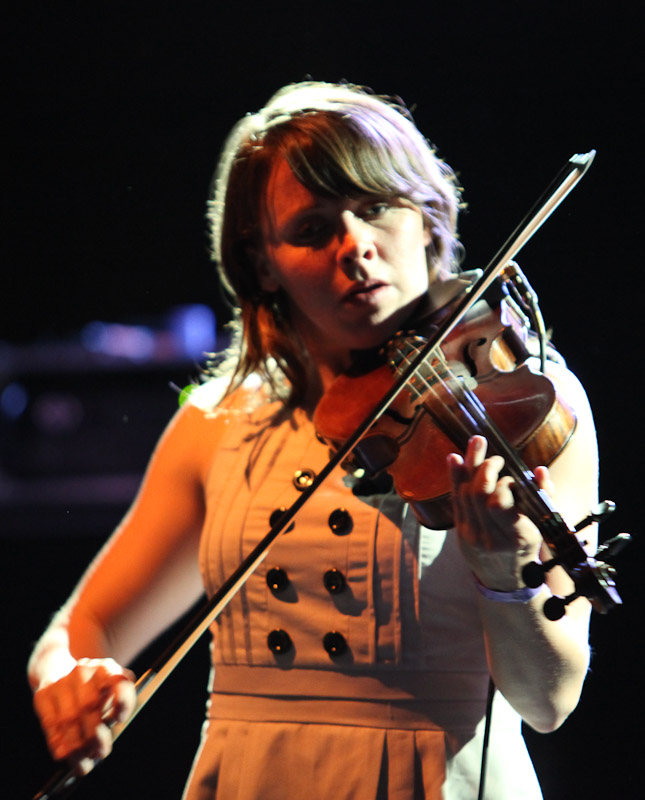
- Neufeld performing with Bell Orchestre

Background information
- Born: August 27, 1979 (age 46); Merville, British Columbia or Courtenay, British Columbia, Canada
- Genres: Indie rock
- Occupation: Violinist
- Instruments: Violin; keyboards; percussion; vocals
- Member of: Arcade Fire, Bell Orchestre, The Luyas
- Website: sarahneufeldmusic.com

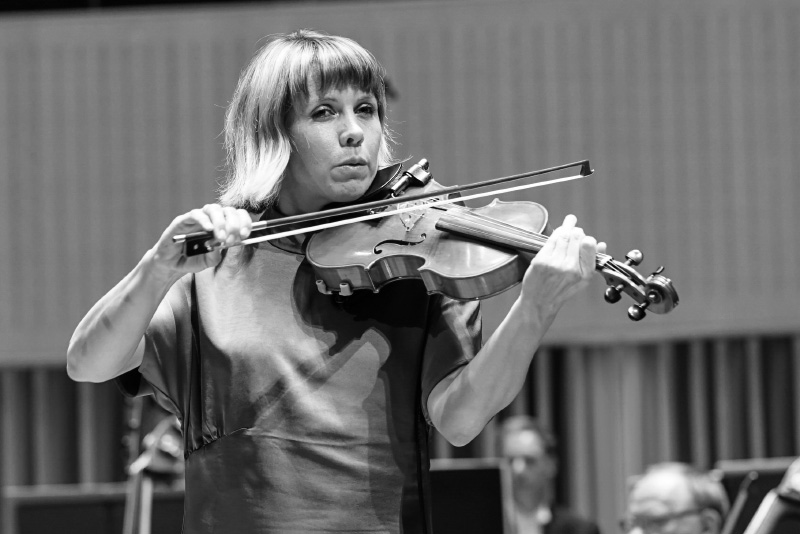
Sarah Neufeld performing with Bell Orchestre + Aarhus Symphony Orchestra (Aarhus, Denmark 2019)

Sarah Neufeld (born August 27, 1979) is a Canadian violinist who is known for her work with indie rock band Arcade Fire, with whom she is a former core member and currently a touring member. She has contributed to each of the band's studio albums to date. Neufeld is also a member of the instrumental band Bell Orchestre.

Neufeld has released three solo studio albums: Hero Brother (2013), The Ridge (2016) and Detritus (2021), and released a collaborative album, Never Were the Way She Was, with her husband Colin Stetson in 2015. In 2024, Neufeld released the collaborative album, First Sounds, with her Arcade Fire and Bell Orchestre bandmate Richard Reed Parry and cellist Rebecca Foon.

== Early life ==
Started playing the violin under the Suzuki method when she was 3 years old. During her teenage years, she 'quit' violin and started playing the guitar to "learn all the Hendrix solos". After realizing her facility with the instrument, she picked up the violin once again during her university years. She says that her time away from the classical rigmarole, helped her take a more relaxed approach when collaborating with others. During her time in the Music Department at Concordia University, Montreal, she formed Bell Orchestre, a group influenced by the likes of Steve Reich, Penguin Cafe Orchestra and Tortoise. Eventually, her playing with Bell Orchestre led to an invitation for her to play with the band Arcade Fire.

== Career ==
=== Arcade Fire ===
Neufeld was a core member of the band on its second and third studio albums, Neon Bible (2007) and The Suburbs (2010), and contributed as an additional musician on the albums Funeral (2004), Reflektor (2013), Everything Now (2017) and WE (2022) and their subsequent tours.

=== Other groups ===
Neufeld is also a member of the post rock band Bell Orchestre, alongside Arcade Fire multi-instrumentalist Richard Reed Parry and former Arcade Fire member Pietro Amato. At age 18, she moved from East Vancouver to Montreal, Quebec, with electronic artist Tim Hecker, where she subsequently joined both bands. She currently lives in Montreal between tours. In 2009, Neufeld joined The Luyas.

=== Solo ===
Neufeld released her first solo album, Hero Brother, in 2013, and released a collaborative studio album, Never Were the Way She Was, with fellow Arcade Fire collaborator Colin Stetson in 2015. In 2016, Neufeld released her second solo album, The Ridge on Paper Bag records. The album features Arcade Fire drummer Jeremy Gara. The Ridge sees Neufeld incorporate more vocals than her previous record, Hero Brother.

=== Score work ===
Neufeld and her husband, saxophonist Colin Stetson, composed the score to the 2013 film Blue Caprice.

== Discography ==
=== Solo ===
Studio albums

- Hero Brother (2013)
- Never Were the Way She Was (2015) (with Colin Stetson)
- The Ridge (2016)
- Detritus (2021)
- First Sounds (2024) (with Richard Reed Parry & Rebecca Foon)

=== Arcade Fire ===
- Funeral (2004)
- Neon Bible (2007)
- The Suburbs (2010)
- Reflektor (2013)
- Everything Now (2017)
- We (2022)

=== Bell Orchestre ===
- Recording a Tape the Colour of the Light (2005)
- As Seen Through Windows (2009)
- House Music (2021)
