= Torngat (disambiguation) =

Torngat commonly refers to the Torngat Mountains in Quebec and Labrador, Canada.

Torngat Mountains may also refer to:

- Torngat Mountains (electoral district), an electoral district in Labrador
- Torngat Mountains National Park, a national park in Nunatsiavut, Labrador
- Torngat Mountain tundra, a World Wide Fund ecoregion in Quebec and Labrador

Torngat may also refer to:

- Torngat (band), a Canadian indie band based in Montreal
- Torngat (album), the band's 2002 self-titled album
