= Reflektor (song) =

2013 single by Arcade Fire

Single by Arcade Fire

from the album Reflektor
- B-side: "Instrumental version"
- Released: September 9, 2013
- Recorded: 2013
- Studio: Sonovox (Montreal)
- Genre: Dance-rock; indie rock; disco
- Length: 7:34 (album version); 4:59 (radio edit)
- Label: Merge; Sonovox
- Songwriters: Will Butler; Win Butler; Régine Chassagne; Jeremy Gara; Tim Kingsbury; Richard Reed Parry
- Producers: Arcade Fire; Markus Dravs; James Murphy

Arcade Fire singles chronology
"Sprawl II (Mountains Beyond Mountains)" (2011)	"Reflektor" (2013)	"Afterlife" (2013)

"Reflektor" is a song by the Canadian indie rock band Arcade Fire. It was released on September 9, 2013, as the first single from and the title track to the band's fourth studio album. Produced by James Murphy, Markus Dravs and the band itself, the song features a guest vocal appearance by David Bowie and was released on a limited edition 12" vinyl credited to the fictional band The Reflektors. Two music videos were made for the song, one regular and one interactive, both being released on the day of the song's release. "Reflektor" was met with positive reviews, with critics often complimenting its musical approach. It also came second in NME's list of best singles of 2013. The song had a positive commercial performance, charting in several countries.

== Background and composition ==
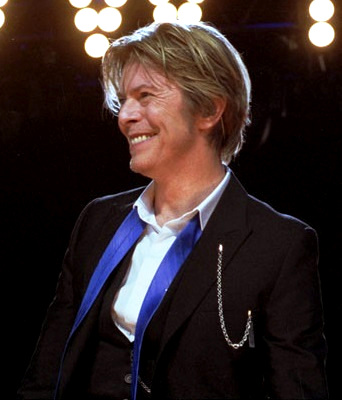
David Bowie performed backing vocals on "Reflektor".

The band began working on the track in 2011, with vocalist and guitarist Win Butler noting, "We recorded a little bit in Louisiana with the Haitian percussionists [Willinson Duprate and Verrieux Zile] and we kind of lived with that. It's an incredibly long process." Regular Arcade Fire collaborators Owen Pallett and Colin Stetson provided instrumental parts, alongside English musician David Bowie who provided vocals for the song. Regarding Bowie's guest appearance on the track, multi-instrumentalist Richard Reed Parry noted, "It was just after The Next Day had come out. He basically just came by the studio in New York while we were mixing, just to have a listen to the stuff we were doing. He offered to lend us his services because he really liked the song. In fact, he basically threatened us – he was like, 'If you don't hurry up and mix this song, I might just steal it from you!' So we thought, well why don't we go one better, why don't you sing on our version? Thankfully he obliged, and we were really happy about that."

"Reflektor" is a dance-rock, indie rock, and disco song. The track's lyrical content is, in part, influenced by the differences between Haitian life and that of the Western world, with vocalist and guitarist Win Butler noting, "I think that life [in Haiti] is incredibly difficult and it's more amazing to see people that don't have access to food or clean water throw a party. It's not like I'm trying to sing about their experiences. I was more learning from what I saw and applying it to my own life, lyrically. I'm not trying to tell other people's stories. We're just trying to allow an experience to change you."

== Reception ==
=== Critical ===
"Reflektor" received widespread critical acclaim. Paste awarded the song a 9.1/10 rating, commenting that it "pretty much kicks ass". Pitchfork awarded the song the "Best New Track" tag, labelling the song a "sleek, dark disco epic that doesn't belong to the 1970s, '80s, '90s-- or any decade". Rolling Stone praised it, saying "Arcade Fire are the most important band of the last decade, and the music lives up to their universe-affirming mandate. "Reflektor" turns a shared sense of isolation into communion with a sleek, surging track that seamlessly integrates arty rock and diagonal funk, breaking down [Arcade Fire]'s epic sound without scrimping on its essential cathartic thrust." American Songwriter also praised the song saying "All seven-plus minutes of the song feel absolutely vital, even if the arrangement suggests something more hedonistic. It's a neat trick they pulled there." NME placed the song at number two on their "50 Best Tracks of 2013" list, with only Daft Punk's "Get Lucky" finishing above it. The song also made Sam Skuse's prestigious 'Top 20 Songs of the Decade' list, placing at number 11.

=== Commercial ===
"Reflektor" charted in several countries, peaking within the top 20 in Canada and Ireland. The song was the band's highest-charting song in Canada, their home country, and their first song on the U.S. Billboard Hot 100 chart, where it peaked at number 99.

== Music video ==
A still from the regular "Reflektor" music video, displaying each band member wearing an oversized papier-mâché head.

A music video for "Reflektor" was released on September 9, 2013, through YouTube. It was directed by Anton Corbijn, with art direction done by Anastasia Masaro. The video won the Best Art Direction award at the 2014 MTV Video Music Awards. Katie Hasty of HitFix summarized the video, stating that "Corbijn's black-and-white version of the "Reflektor" experience has its own quirks, too, as the band dons oversized papier mache heads like puppet versions of themselves, hunting down the Disco Ball Man and putting the doll versions of themselves in a shiny coffin." An interactive music video was also made available to the public, which was directed by Vincent Morisset. However, it was made only accessible through the web browser Google Chrome. For this video, the user oversees dancer Axelle Munezero's journey through the streets of Haiti.

== Packaging ==
=== Artwork ===
The single's cover artwork makes no mention of the band's name, and is instead credited to the fictional band The Reflektors. The front cover features a silhouette image of the band's core members. The album's back cover features a woman touching one of the band's Haitian veve images, used previously in a guerrilla marketing to promote Reflektor's forthcoming release.

=== Fictional track listing ===
The remainder of the 12" vinyl's artwork suggests that it is a full-length album by The Reflektors. A fictional album track listing, inspired by the song's lyrical content, is featured on its back cover.

Disc one

1. "Prism of Light"
2. "Darkness of White"
3. "Alone on a Stage"
4. "Reflective Age"
5. "L'Aurore"
6. "If This Is Heaven"
7. "A Way to Enter"

Disc two

1. "Signals We Send"
2. "Staring at a Screen"
3. "The Connector"
4. "The Other Side"
5. "Our Love Is Plastic"
6. "Break Me (Down Down Down)"
7. "The Resurrector"

== Track listing ==
- Merge / Sonovox — MRG484

Side A
No.	Title	Length
1.	"Reflektor"	7:42

Side B
No.	Title	Length
1.	"Reflektor" (Instrumental)	7:42

== Credits and personnel ==
Personnel adapted from the single's liner notes.

Arcade Fire

- Win Butler – vocals
- Régine Chassagne – vocals
- Richard Reed Parry – electric guitar, backing vocals
- Will Butler – keyboards, backing vocals
- Tim Kingsbury – electric guitar, backing vocals
- Jeremy Gara – drums

Additional musicians

- David Bowie – additional vocals
- Owen Pallett – orchestral arrangements
- Colin Stetson – saxophone
- Stuart Bogie – saxophone
- Willinson Duprate – congas
- Verrieux Zile – congas

Recording personnel

- James Murphy – production
- Markus Dravs – production
- Arcade Fire – production
- Mark Lawson – additional production, recording
- Korey Richey – recording
- Pascal Shefteshy – recording
- Damian Taylor – recording
- Tom Elmhirst – mixing
- Ted Jensen – mastering

== Chart performance ==
=== Weekly charts ===
Chart (2013)	Peak position
Australia (ARIA)	96
Belgium (Ultratip Bubbling Under Flanders)	35
Belgium (Ultratip Bubbling Under Wallonia)	38
Canada (Canadian Hot 100)	20
Canada Rock (Billboard)	8
Czech Republic Modern Rock (IFPI)	15
France (SNEP)	67
Ireland (IRMA)	20
Poland (LP3)	32
Scottish Singles Sales (Official Charts)	51
Spain (Promusicae)	42
UK Singles (Official Charts)	44
US Billboard Hot 100	99
US Adult Alternative Airplay (Billboard)	11
US Alternative Airplay (Billboard)	17
US Hot Rock & Alternative Songs (Billboard)	14
US Rock & Alternative Airplay (Billboard)	24

=== Year-end charts ===
Chart (2013)	Position
US Hot Rock Songs (Billboard)	71

== Certifications ==
Region	Certification	Certified units/sales
Canada (Music Canada)	Platinum	80,000^{‡}
^{‡} Sales+streaming figures based on certification alone.
