= Afterlife (Arcade Fire song) =

Single by Arcade Fire

from the album Reflektor
- Released: September 28, 2013
- Recorded: Sonovox Studios, Montreal
- Genre: Art rock; dance-rock
- Length: 5:52 (album version); 4:12 (radio edit)
- Label: Merge
- Songwriter(s): William Butler, Win Butler, Régine Chassagne, Jeremy Gara, Tim Kingsbury, Richard Reed Parry
- Producer(s): James Murphy, Markus Dravs, Arcade Fire

Arcade Fire singles chronology
"Reflektor" (2013)	"Afterlife" (2013)	"We Exist" (2014)

"Afterlife" is a song by Canadian indie rock band Arcade Fire. It was released on September 28, 2013, as a single from the band's fourth studio album, Reflektor. The song was debuted on Saturday Night Live.

== Music videos ==
The music video for the song was released on November 21, 2013. The short film, directed by Emily Kai Bock and shot with a mix of 35mm and 65mm film, depicts a Latino family in Los Angeles, California, dreaming of their missing mother.

The video won the 2014 Prism Prize.

The band also performed a live video, streamed on YouTube at the YouTube Music Awards in November 2013. It was directed by Spike Jonze.

An official live performance video was also released in April 2014 on the band's YouTube channel.

Scenes from the 1959 film Black Orpheus were used in the official lyric videos.

== Live performances ==
The band performed "Afterlife" at Saturday Night Live, The Tonight Show Starring Jimmy Fallon, and The Graham Norton Show. The song was performed live on every show of the Reflektor tour.

== Chart performance ==
Chart (2013)	Peak position
Belgium (Ultratip Bubbling Under Flanders)	3
Belgium (Ultratip Bubbling Under Wallonia)	14
Canada (Canadian Hot 100)	100
Canada Rock (Billboard)	9
Poland (LP3)	47
US Rock & Alternative Airplay (Billboard)	43
US Adult Alternative Songs (Billboard)	18
US Alternative Airplay (Billboard)	22
