= All This I Do for Glory =

Studio album by Colin Stetson
- Released: April 28, 2017
- Genre: Post-minimalism; jazz; heavy metal; fusion; post-rock; ritual
- Length: 43:31
- Label: 52 Hz
- Producer: Colin Stetson

Colin Stetson chronology
SORROW: A Reimagining of Gorecki's 3rd Symphony (2016)	All This I Do for Glory (2017)	Ex Eye (2017)

Singles from All This I Do for Glory
- 1. "Spindrift" Released: February 16, 2017; 2. "In the Clinches" Released: March 16, 2017

All This I Do for Glory is the fifth solo studio album of American bass saxophonist Colin Stetson, released on April 28, 2017 by the label 52 Hz. It is the first of a two-part album series by Stetson that explores two different arcs of the same character. The LP follows a narrative, a doomed love story set during a time between Never Were the Way She Was (2015) and New History Warfare Vol. 1 (2008). All This I Do For Glory differs from Stetson's previous releases due to its emphasis on his breathing techniques in the sound, it contains elements of 1990s experimental music and IDM, and its increased focus on rhythm that makes it more accessible to most listeners. The LP was critically well-received upon its release for Steston's skill of performing many sounds with one instrument, his recording methods, the pacing of the music, and the increased restraint on his maximalist sound.

== Concept ==
Narratively, All This I Do for Glory is set during a time between Never Were the Way She Was (2015) and New History Warfare Vol. 1 (2008). The album is the first half of a tragic love story with themes of legacy, ambitions, and what goes on after death "in the model of the greek tragedies," explained the press release. The album is the first of two "studies," or arcs of the narrative's main protagonist, and serves to "more or less disprov[e] the statement of the record. Or I guess its illustrating the fundamental logical flaws in [the album's title] as a statement," Stetson explained in an interview. The compositions are presented by the same "ancestries" as Stetson's New History Warfare trilogy, and thus employ repetitive structures to show the ancestries, making the LP a set of ritual music. The "juxtaposition" of the LP's narrative takes place between "Spindrift" and "In the Clinches," according to Stetson: "Whereas 'Spindrift' is serenity and expanse, 'In The Clinches' is violence and immediacy." According to Stetson, the name of the record was meant to sound "religious" and reflect his increasingly "audacious" sound.

== Production and composition ==
All This I Do for Glory was Stetson's first released where he produced the music all by himself: "It's the best scenario for me that I've found so far because I get to work when I need to work and I can work for as long as I need to and I don't have to rely on anybody else's time. [...] It was by far the most fun I've had making a record." Like other Colin Stetson albums, All This I Do for Glory is a set of one-take, non-edited recordings that follow a "dogmatically stripped down approach to performance and capture," as the album's official press release describes it, and depict the saxophonist performing circular breathing. The songs consist of several sections, experiment with intervals and sound layers, and feature dissonant sounds, percussion from key taps, and vocals sung through his saxophone that are tracked via contact microphones.

However, All This I Do for Glory follows a more restrained take of Stetson's maximalist sound. As the press release described the album, "the overall experience is one of extreme intimacy, the sounds and imagery more tangible and immersive than previous offerings." The LP showcases Stetson's experimentation with a technique known as "venting," where, as he explained in an interview, "you open the sides of your mouth very slightly and let the air pass outside to create a sound of airiness." He was inspired to work with venting by listen to Enya's album Shepherd Moons (1991), which "made me think about how the air is manipulated in my own music." As such, Stetson performed an "invasive and thorough" microphone setup where multiple mics were only inches away from him so that they could record more of his breath. This gives the music a hyperreal tone.

All This I Do for Glory has also been described by some reviewers to be Stetson's most listener-friendly and accessible release to date, Peter Ellman of Exclaim! reasoning that it contains more of a "rhythmic heft" than the saxophonist's past music. Other ways All This I Do for Glory differs from Stetson's previous works include its increased focus on songwriting and percussive instruments followings elements of 1990s experimental and IDM works by artists such as Aphex Twin and Autechre.

== Critical reception ==
Professional ratings
Aggregate scores
Source	Rating
AnyDecentMusic?	7.9/10
Metacritic	80/100
Review scores
Source	Rating
AllMusic	4/5 stars
The A.V. Club	B+
Drowned in Sound	10/10
Exclaim!	10/10
Pitchfork	7.1/10
PopMatters	7/10 stars
Record Collector	4/5 stars
Spectrum Culture	3.75/5 stars
The Skinny	3/5 stars
Uncut	8/10

All This I Do for Glory was praised by many reviewers for its ability to produce a wide variety of sounds with one instrument and Stetson's use of several microphones that give the record a more detailed and interesting sound.

Gigwise claimed the album is "music that for sheer ability ought to be admired and there's something darkly spiritual about the execution of the sound which is haunting, tense, and paranoid – in a good way." The spooky vibe of the record was also noted by journalist Michael Sumsion, who wrote that with All This I Do for Glory, "Colin Stetson conjures a thrilling, muscular vision of modern jazz that introduces subtle rhythmic alterations to his fiery, minimalist style." The 405 stated, "For those who are willing and eager to succumb to Stetson's idiosyncratic sound, pressing play on this album is like stepping into his wilderness, and if you're prepared to be battered by typhoon-like playing and virtuosic arrangements of sound, then you'll come out the other side thrilled and refreshed."

Some critics praised the increased restraint on Stetson's maximalist tendencies, The A.V. Club writer Clayton Purdom stating that it "allows him to open up his sonic palette, finding dense polyrhythms and (gasp) traditional melody in addition to the characteristically entrancing push and pull of his technique." He concluded in his review, "By zeroing in on a more human theme, [Stetson] has found a way to open up, creating an album that's easier to listen to than its predecessors while still being dazzlingly difficult to perform." Tom Hull called Stetson a "post-rock experimentalist" and gave the album an A-minus, saying, "This is industrial/minimalist fusion, recycling rhythms with the extra resonance of wind instruments and some vocal shadowing. Seems fairly simple, but remains unique."

Nilan Perera highlighted its "sense of music over technique that's rare in instrumental outings" in both its pace and sound. He and Spectrum Culture's Paul John also praised the pacing of the album's repetitive, minimalistic sound, John writing, "casual listeners will find themselves turned off by the apparent sameness of each track in terms of both form and structure, but those more adventurous listeners will be well served to simply allow the music to flow over and around them." Earbuddy stated that "its progression doesn't come fast. Instead, it builds slowly, testing your patience."

In a more mixed review, Jayson Greene of Pitchfork criticized the album's lack of new elements to Stetson's sound. The Wire opined, "As the 12 minute "The Lure Of The Mine" closes out this odd and enigmatic record in typically relentless fashion, the sensation is one of standing back and watching, impressed but stubbornly, confusingly unmoved."

== Accolades ==
Publication	Accolade	Rank	Ref.
AllMusic	Best of 2017: Favorite Jazz Albums	—N/a	
Drowned in Sound	Favourite Albums of 2017	32	
Exclaim!	Best of 2017: Top 10 Improv and Avant-Garde Albums	—N/a	
Fopp	The Best in 2017	100	
Gigwise	51 Best Albums of 2017	41	
musicOMH	Top 50 Albums Of 2017	34	
Norman Records	Albums of the Year 2017	6	
PopMatters	The Best Avant-Garde and Experimental Music of 2017	2	

== Track listing ==
No.	Title	Length
1.	"All This I Do for Glory"	7:19
2.	"Like Wolves on the Fold"	7:36
3.	"Between Water and Wind"	6:23
4.	"Spindrift"	6:27
5.	"In the Clinches"	2:47
6.	"The Lure of the Mine"	12:59
Total length:		43:31

== Personnel ==
- Colin Stetson – alto saxophones, tenor saxophones, bass saxophones, contrabass clarinet, engineering, mixing, production
- Mell Dettmer – mastering
- Eli Crews – additional mixing
- Kent Rogowski – artwork, layout

== Release history ==
Region	Date	Format(s)	Label
Worldwide	April 20, 2017	Streaming	NPR Music
Worldwide	April 28, 2017	CD; digital download; vinyl	52 Hz
