= We Exist =

Single by Arcade Fire

from the album Reflektor
- Released: 26 May 2014
- Recorded: Sonovox Studios, Montreal
- Genre: Dance-rock; new wave
- Length: 5:43
- Label: Merge
- Songwriters: William Butler, Win Butler, Régine Chassagne, Jeremy Gara, Tim Kingsbury, Richard Reed Parry
- Producers: James Murphy, Markus Dravs, Arcade Fire

Arcade Fire singles chronology
"Afterlife" (2013)	"We Exist" (2014)	"Everything Now" (2017)

"We Exist" is a song by Canadian indie rock band Arcade Fire from their fourth studio album, Reflektor (2013). It was released digitally as the third single from the album on 26 May 2014 via Sonovox. The music video for the song, starring Andrew Garfield, was released on 16 May 2014.

== Background ==
"We Exist" conveys a message of self-empowerment and equality. The song was described by Arcade Fire lead singer Win Butler as "about a gay kid talking to his dad" and coming out to his straight father. Introducing the song onstage, Butler also said that "the right to marry anyone you want is a human rights issue."

== Music video ==
A music video to promote the song was released on 16 May 2014. It was directed by David Wilson and stars Hollywood actor Andrew Garfield in the role of a transgender woman. Scenes for the video were shot during an Arcade Fire concert at 2014 Coachella Valley Music and Arts Festival, which was headlined by the band. The video starts with Garfield's character shaving her head and getting dressed. She then goes to a small-town local bar where she is harassed and assaulted by some bar patrons. She collapses and enters a "dream-like sequence", where she dances accompanied by a group of male dancers in matching plaid half-shirts and jean shorts. In the final moments of the video, the protagonist walks through a portal to Arcade Fire's Coachella concert, where she dances on stage.

Rolling Stone magazine's Ryan Reed commented that the video is "a perfect match for Win Butler's lyrics and the track's throbbing synth-rock arrangement." Melissa Locker of Time magazine wrote that it is "a tense, riveting video that adds even greater depth to the already meaningful song." MTV's Gil Kaufman wrote that "in the just-released full video for Arcade Fire's LGBT acceptance anthem 'We Exist,' Garfield dresses up like you've never seen him before. An early teaser suggested that the actor would do drag for the six-plus minute mini-movie, but the full version of the clip tells a much deeper, more emotionally wrenching story." He also praised Andrew Garfield's dancing skills in the Flashdance-inspired dream sequence. However, the video was criticised by transgender musician Laura Jane Grace, who believed that it reflected stereotyping and suggested that the video should have featured a trans actress in the role of the protagonist rather than a cis male portraying a trans woman. Wilson responded that he had initially planned for a trans woman to play the role but that he had given it to Garfield due to the latter's excitement about the project. Butler also defended the use of Garfield in the role, stating that "For a gay kid in Jamaica to see the actor who played Spider-Man in that role is pretty damn powerful, in my opinion". After speaking to Our Lady J, a trans woman who worked on the video, Grace tweeted that her perspective had changed.

On 5 December 2014, the music video was nominated for a Grammy Award for Best Music Video.

== Charts ==
Chart (2014)	Peak position
Belgium (Ultratip Bubbling Under Flanders)	3
Canada Rock (Billboard)	36
Poland (LP3)	48
US Hot Rock & Alternative Songs (Billboard)	46
