= Never Were the Way She Was =

Studio album by Colin Stetson and Sarah Neufeld
- Released: April 28, 2015
- Studio: End of the World (Vermont)
- Genre: Experimental, avant-garde jazz, ambient
- Length: 42:51
- Label: Constellation

Colin Stetson chronology
| New History Warfare Vol. 3: To See More Light (2013) | Never Were the Way She Was (2015) | SORROW: A Reimagining of Gorecki's 3rd Symphony (2016) |

Sarah Neufeld chronology
| Black Ground EP (2013) | Never Were the Way She Was (2015) | The Ridge (2016) |

Never Were the Way She Was is a collaborative album by Colin Stetson and Sarah Neufeld, released on April 28, 2015 by Constellation Records. It was recorded live in the studio without the use of overdubs or loops at the End of the World studio in Vermont. Neufeld and Stetson had first met in 2006 when Neufeld's Bell Orchestre shared a bill with Antibalas, who Stetson was playing with. The two artists had previously collaborated on the soundtrack to the 2013 film Blue Caprice. The album received favorable reviews and won a Juno Award.

== Reception ==
Professional ratings
Aggregate scores
| Source | Rating |
|---|---|
| Metacritic | 81/100 |
Review scores
| Source | Rating |
| AllMusic | 4/5 stars |
| Drowned in Sound | 8/10 |
| NME | 7/10 |
| Pitchfork | 7.7/10 |
| Spin | 7/10 |

At Metacritic, which assigns a normalised rating out of 100 to reviews from mainstream critics, Never Were the Way She Was received an average score of 81, based on 19 reviews, indicating "universal acclaim". AllMusic reviewer Thom Jurek said that the album was too short, commenting that the songs "last only as long as they hold interest for the players, though they all create a real desire for more in the listener - which is no complaint at all." Alexander Tudor of Drowned in Sound called the album a "triumph for instrumental music" and said that Stetson and Neufeld "work perfectly; long may they continue to work together." NME reviewer Cian Traynor said that the pairing was "seamless" and that the album contained "expertly controlled energy" which "unfolds like a well-crafted score to an imagined film." Harley Brown of Spin called it a "cohesive meditation on the legacy of avant-garde greats" and said it was "an essential part of Stetson and Neufeld's own impressive canons." In his review for Pitchfork, Jayson Greene said the album was an "implicit reminder of the things that can be done with two instruments and two hands."

Never Were the Way She Was won the 2016 Juno Award for Instrumental Album of the Year. The album was also longlisted nominee for the 2015 Polaris Music Prize.

== Track listing ==
All tracks are written by Colin Stetson and Sarah Neufeld.

Never Were the Way She Was track listing
| No. | Title | Length |
|---|---|---|
| 1. | "The Sun Roars Into View" | 7:37 |
| 2. | "Won't Be a Thing to Become" | 3:24 |
| 3. | "In the Vespers" | 6:01 |
| 4. | "And Still They Move" | 2:56 |
| 5. | "With the Dark Hug of Time" | 6:33 |
| 6. | "The Rest of Us" | 6:30 |
| 7. | "Never Were the Way She Was" | 8:12 |
| 8. | "Flight" | 1:38 |
| Total length: | | 42:51 |

== Personnel ==
- Colin Stetson – tenor saxophone, bass saxophone, contrabass clarinet
- Sarah Neufeld – violin, voice
- Hans Bernhard – engineering
- Mark Lawson – mixing
- Harris Newman – mastering
- Kim Meinelt – photography
- Scott Irvine – photography
