= Colin Stetson =

American saxophonist and composer (born 1975)

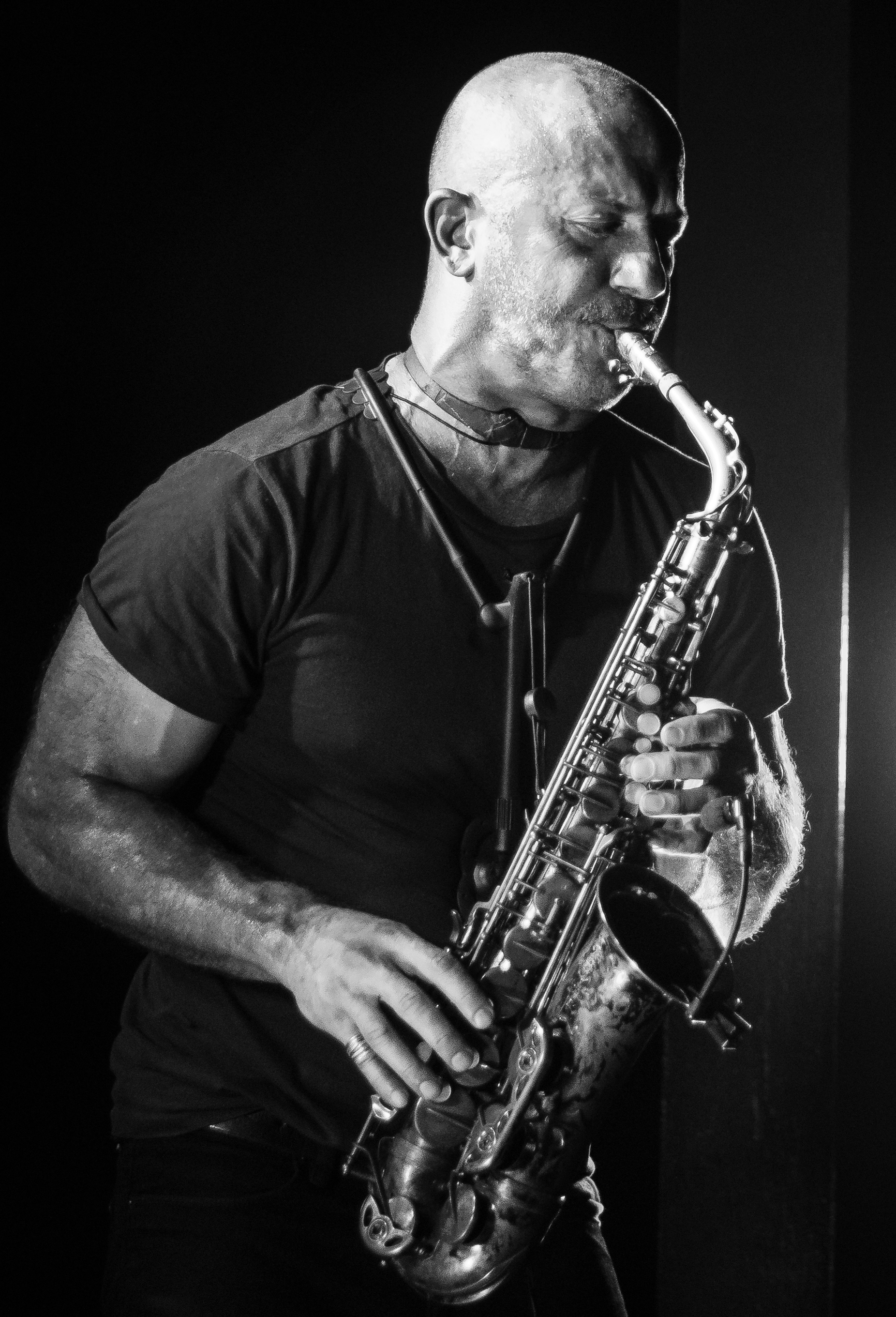
- Stetson in 2023

Background information
- Born: March 3, 1975 (age 51); Ann Arbor, Michigan, U.S.
- Genres: Jazz; experimental; avant-garde; indie rock
- Instruments: Bass saxophone; saxophone; clarinet; bass clarinet; French horn; flute; cornet
- Labels: Constellation; 52 Hz
- Website: colinstetson.com

Colin Stetson (born March 3, 1975) is an American saxophonist, multireedist, and composer based in Montreal. He is best known as a regular collaborator of the indie rock acts Arcade Fire, Bon Iver, Bell Orchestre, and Ex Eye. He specializes in the bass and alto saxophones, but also plays the soprano, tenor, baritone, and mezzo-soprano saxophones. In addition, he plays clarinet, bass clarinet, French horn, flute, and cornet.

Stetson has released various solo releases, including his debut and subsequent albums New History Warfare Vol. 1, 2, & 3, a collaborative studio album with violinist Sarah Neufeld entitled Never Were the Way She Was (2015), Sorrow: A Reimagining of Henryk Górecki's 3rd Symphony (2016), and All This I Do for Glory (2017). Since 2013, Stetson has contributed the scores to several films and television series.

== Background ==
Born in Ann Arbor, Michigan and currently based in Montreal, Quebec, Stetson started taking lessons at age 15. He attended the University of Michigan School of Music with a full scholarship, where he joined Transmission Trio. He also played with the groups Boostamonte and the People's Bizarre.

Stetson has performed and recorded with dozens of artists, including Tom Waits, Arcade Fire, TV on the Radio, Feist, and Bon Iver.

His extended saxophone techniques cover advanced circular breathing, multiphonics, altissimo, microtones, (reed) vocalizations, percussive valve-work, clicking keys, and growling. The overall effect led The New Yorker film critic Anthony Lane to describe Stetson's score to the film Hereditary as having been seemingly "scored for violins, percussion, a humpback whale, and bats."

== Solo career ==
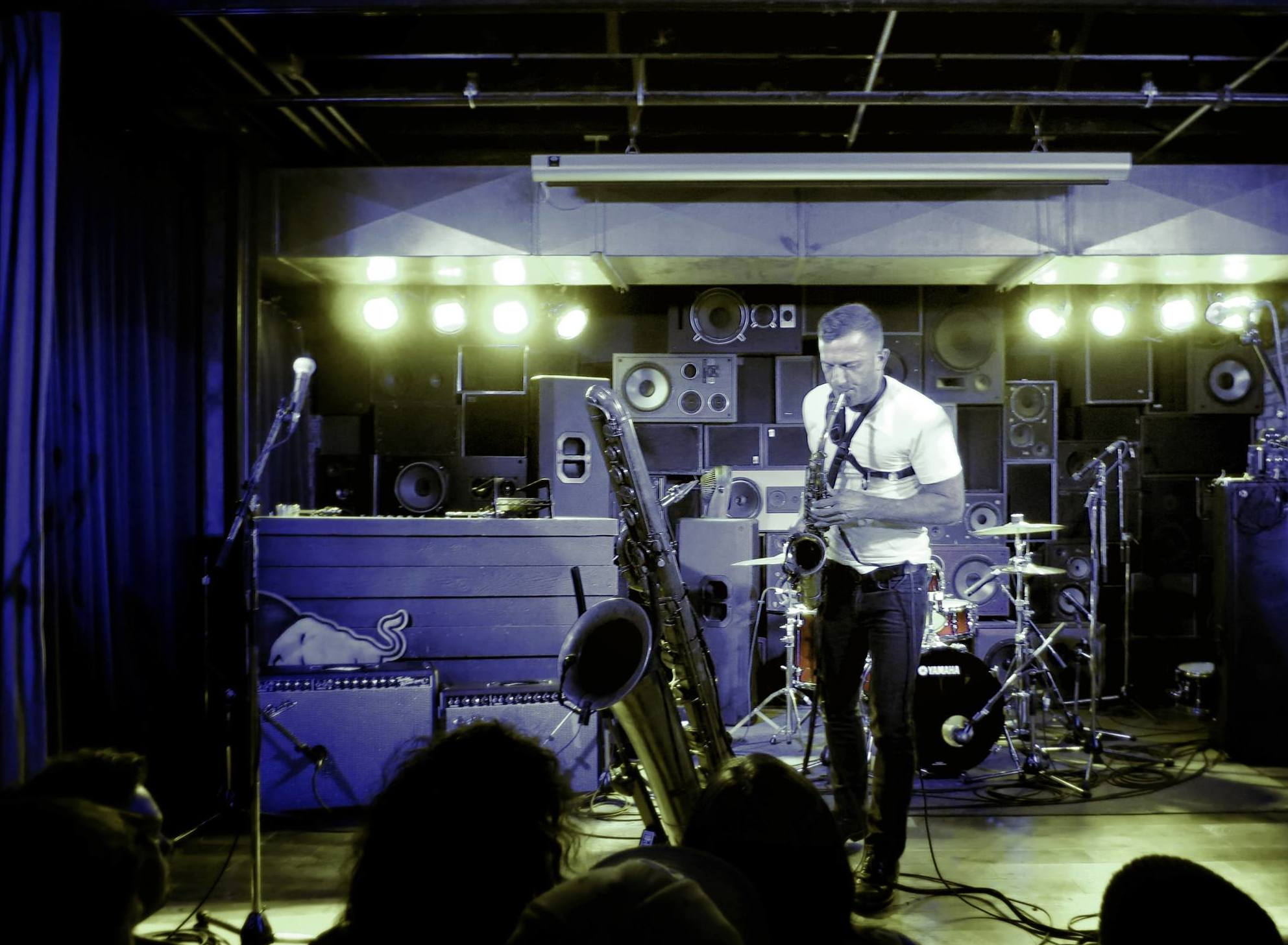
Colin Stetson at Sled Island Music and Arts Festival, Calgary, 2013.

His first solo album, New History Warfare Vol. 1, was released in 2008. His second album, New History Warfare Vol. 2: Judges, was released by Constellation Records in early 2011. On June 16, the album was named as a longlisted nominee for the 2011 Polaris Music Prize, and shortlisted on July 6.

Stetson was chosen by Jeff Mangum of Neutral Milk Hotel to perform at the All Tomorrow's Parties festival that he curated in December 2011 in Minehead, England. The final album of the trilogy, New History Warfare Vol. 3: To See More Light, was released by Constellation Records in April 2013, and was a longlist nominee for the 2013 Polaris Music Prize.

April 2015 saw the release of Never Were the Way She Was, the first recording of Stetson's duo project with his then wife and long-time collaborator Sarah Neufeld. Stetson's album All This I Do for Glory was released on April 28, 2017. In 2022 he released the drone-inspired album Chimæra I. It was followed a year later by the minimalist When We Were That What Wept for the Sea. In September 2024, Stetson released The Love It Took to Leave You.

== Discography ==
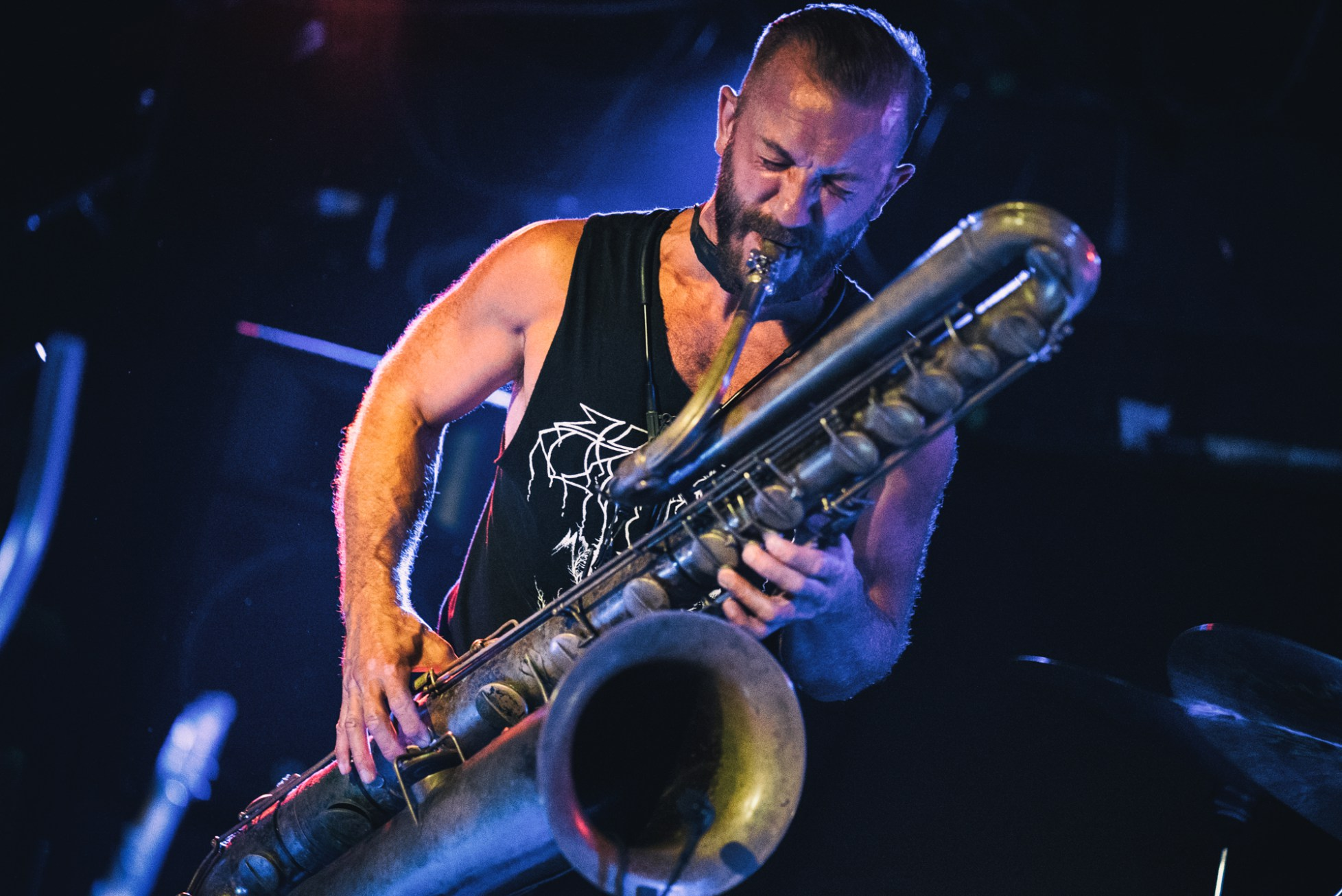
Colin Stetson with Ex Eye @ Strange Matter, 2017

=== Solo albums/As leader ===
- Tiny Beast (2003) with Transmission Trio
- Slow Descent (2003)
- New History Warfare Vol. 1 (2007)
- The Righteous Wrath of an Honorable Man 7" (2010)
- New History Warfare Vol. 2: Judges (2011)
- Those Who Didn't Run EP (2011)
- New History Warfare Vol. 3: To See More Light (2013)
- Sorrow: A Reimagining of Gorecki's 3rd Symphony (2016)
- All This I Do for Glory (2017)
- Chimæra I (2022)
- When We Were That What Wept for the Sea (2023)
- The Love It Took to Leave You (2024)

=== Soundtrack albums ===
- Blue Caprice (2013)
- La Peur (2015)
- Outlaws and Angels (2016)
- Hereditary (2018)
- The First (2018)
- Color Out of Space (2020)
- Barkskins (2020)
- Deliver Us (2020)
- The War Show (2020)
- Mayday (2021)
- Texas Chainsaw Massacre (2022)
- Among the Stars (2022)
- The Menu (Original Motion Picture Soundtrack) (2022)
- Uzumaki (2024)
- Martha (2024)

=== Collaborations with other artists ===
- Gringo Blaster (2002) with Michael Kowalski
- Stones (2012) with Mats Gustafsson
- Never Were the Way She Was (2015) with Sarah Neufeld
- Ex Eye (2017) with Ex Eye (Greg Fox, Shahzad Ismaily, Toby Summerfield)
- Radiate (2015) with The Chemical Brothers
- Confessions Pt II (2016) with BadBadNotGood
- The Long Road North (2022) with Cult of Luna
- Void Patrol (2022) with Void Patrol (Elliott Sharp, Billy Martin, Payton MacDonald)
- No Highs (2023) with Tim Hecker
- Carry Them with Us (2023) with Brìghde Chaimbeul
- Nethering (2026) with Greg Fox and Trevor Dunn
- All the light in the world (2026) with Brìghde Chaimbeul

=== As sideman ===
With Tom Waits

- Blood Money (2002)
- Alice (2002)
- Orphans: Brawlers, Bawlers & Bastards (2006)

With Arcade Fire

- Neon Bible (2007)
- The Suburbs (2010)
- Reflektor (2013)

With TV on the Radio

- Dear Science (2008)

With Jolie Holland

- The Living and the Dead (2008)

With Feist

- Metals (2011)

With Esmerine

- La Lechuza (2011)

With Timber Timbre

- Creep on Creepin' On (2011)
- Hot Dreams (2014)

With Bon Iver

- Bon Iver, Bon Iver (2011)
- 22, A Million (2016)

With David Gilmour

- Rattle That Lock (2015)

With BadBadNotGood

- IV (2016)

With Animal Collective

- Painting With (2016)

With Sarah Neufeld

- The Ridge (2016)

With Marcus Hamblett

- Detritus (2019)

== Filmography ==
=== Film ===
Year	Title	Director	Notes
2007	Greyhounds	Kelilyn Mohr McKeever	Short film
2012	Rust and Bone	Jacques Audiard	Composer, Musician: "All the Days I've Missed You (Ilaij I)"
2013	12 Years a Slave	Steve McQueen	Composer, Musician: "Awake on Foreign Shores"
2013	Blue Caprice	Alexandre Moors	
2014	The Rover	David Michôd	Composer, Musician: "Time is Advancing with Fitful Irregularity", "As a Bird or Branch", "Groundswell", "Awake on Foreign Shores"
2015	La Peur	Damien Odul	
2015	Vi ska bli rappare	David Danial	Composer, Musician: "Stand, Walk"
2015	Denis the Pirate	Sam Messer	Composed with Sarah Neufeld
2015	It's About Time	Ivo Briedis	Short film
2015	Closet Monster	Stephen Dunn	Composer, Musician: "The Stars In His Head (Dark Lights Remix)"
2016	Lavender	Ed Gass-Donnelly	Composed with Sarah Neufeld
2016	Outlaws and Angels	J. T. Mollner	
2016	The War Show	Andreas Møl Dalsgaard & Obaidah Zytoon	
2018	Age Out	A.J. Edwards	
2018	Hereditary	Ari Aster	
2018	We	Rene Eller	
2019	Color Out of Space	Richard Stanley	
2021	Mayday	Karen Cinorre	
2022	Texas Chainsaw Massacre	David Blue Garcia	
2022	The Menu	Mark Mylod	
2024	Hold Your Breath	Karrie Crouse and Will Joines	Composer
2026	Mayday	Jonathan Goldstein and John Francis Daley	Composer

=== Documentary film ===
Year	Title	Director	Notes
2012	Shut Up and Play the Hits	Will Lovelace and Dylan Southern	cast as himself
2014	A City Is an Island	Timothy George Kelly	cast as himself
2015	An American, Portrait of Raymond Luc Levasseur	Pierre Marier	
2015	New York Never Sleeps	Alfonso Nogueroles	
2015	Scrum	Poppy Stockell	
2016	The Devil's Horn	Larry Weinstein	cast as himself
2016	Uncle Howard	Aaron Brookner	Composer, Musician: "In Mirrors"
2017	Destierros	Hubert Caron-Guay	Partial score
2024	Martha	R. J. Cutler	

=== Television ===
Year	Title	Network	Notes
2014	The Blacklist The Alchemist (No. 101)	NBC	performer: " Warm Shadow" - uncredited
2017	Philip K. Dick's Electric Dreams Human Is	Channel 4	performer: "The rest of us" - uncredited
2018	The First	Hulu, Channel 4	
2020	Barkskins	National Geographic	
2021	Among the Stars	Disney Plus	Composer for all 6 Episodes
2023	Hogan's Castle	Netflix	Composer for all 11 Episodes
2024	Uzumaki	Adult Swim's Toonami	
2026	Something Very Bad Is Going to Happen	Netflix	

=== Video game ===
Year	Title	Studio
2018	Red Dead Redemption 2	Rockstar Games
