= The Fear (2015 film) =

2015 film

- French film poster
- French: La Peur
- Directed by: Damien Odoul
- Written by: adaptation by: Loïc Gaillard; Damien Odoul; Aude Py
- Screenplay by: Damien Odoul
- Based on: La Peur (1930 novel) by Gabriel Chevallier
- Produced by: Jean-Pierre Guérin; Gérard Lacroix; Claude Léger; Sylvain Proulx; Olivier Père
- Starring: Nino Rocher; Pierre Martial Gaillard; Théo Chazal; Eliott Margueron; Frédéric Buffaras
- Cinematography: Martin Laporte
- Edited by: Marie-Eve Nadeau
- Music by: Colin Stetson
- Production companies: JPG Films; Tu Vas Voir Productions; Les Productions de la Peur; Transfilm International; Arte France Cinéma; Canal+; Centre National de la Cinématographie; Le Pacte; Wild Bunch; Indéfilms 3
- Distributed by: Le Pacte
- Release date: 12 August 2015 (France)
- Running time: 93 minutes
- Country: France
- Language: French

The Fear (French: La Peur) is a 2015 French war drama film directed by Damien Odoul. The film won the 2015 Cinema of France award Prix Jean Vigo, and was screened in the Contemporary World Cinema section of the 2015 Toronto International Film Festival.

== Plot ==
Gabriel Dufour (Nino Rocher) is a young conscript in the French Army during the First World War. Along with fellow conscripts from his small town, he is sent to the front in 1914. Through the trials, horrors, and tribulations of war, he survives and discovers his own humanity.

== Cast ==
- Nino Rocher as Gabriel Dufour
- Pierre Martial Gaillard as Nègre
- Théo Chazal as Théophile
- Eliott Margueron as Bertrand
- Frédéric Buffaras as Lespinasse
- Jonathan Jimeno Romera as La Gaufre
- Charles Josse as Fouchet
- Aniouta Maïdel as Marguerite
- Patrick de Valette as Ferdinand
- Yarrow Martin as Perreault
- Amélie Martinez as Joséphine

== Production ==
Secretly shot from 15 September through 24 October 2015, on locations in Canada, filming completed and the film entered post-production in late November. The film represents Damien Odoul's seventh feature film.

== Reception ==
Abus de Cine noted in-depth films covering World War I from a French viewpoint were rare, and noted La Peur as ambitious. While the reviewer felt the film was uneven in its interpretation, he felt it was worth watching.

While also noting an unevenness in interpretation, La Croix praised the director for immersing the viewer into the war from a uniquely French perspective, and the work of actor Nino Rocher in the lead role.

Libération noted director Damien Odoul's success in capturing the horrors of trench warfare through his graphic film adaptation of the memoirs of a survivor of "The Great War".

Le Figaro wrote that the film was remarkable in its retelling of the fears and horrors suffered by French soldiers during World War I.

France 24 praised director Damien Odoul for his unfettered depictions of the true horrors seen and suffered by French soldiers from 1914 through 1918 in the trenches of World War I. While it was felt the director took liberties in his adaptation of the Gabriel Chevallier novel, the changes were as the filmmaker intended in order to contemporize the history being told.

== Awards and nominations ==
- 2015, won the Cinema of France Prix Jean Vigo award.
