= The Menu (soundtrack) =

The Menu (Original Motion Picture Soundtrack)

Film score by Colin Stetson
- Released: November 18, 2022
- Recorded: 2021–2022
- Genre: Film score
- Length: 42:26
- Label: Milan
- Producer: Colin Stetson

Colin Stetson chronology
| Texas Chainsaw Massacre (2022) | The Menu (2022) | Uzumaki (2023) |

The Menu (Original Motion Picture Soundtrack) is the score album to the 2022 film of the same name, directed by Mark Mylod and features music composed by Colin Stetson, released by Milan Records on November 18, 2022. The album featured 14 tracks from Stetson's original music composed for the film, which had certain musical approaches and layers diverse throughout the film and the characters, and relied much on orchestral music.

== Development ==
The music is composed by Colin Stetson who said that the music that practically wrote itself based on the script, which he received when the film was under completion and being shown a rough cut of the film. He called the script as "very, very clear, and utterly vivid; the tone, the shape, the function of it all". Stetson felt that the score is similar to Hereditary (2018), in one way where "the fact of that plan being set in motion right from the very start of the film. But it does so by almost goading the audience and the diners." So he used subtle harmonic things and tongue-in-cheek gestures, to introduce fear throughout the film, which affects certain melodies in certain ways.

The score has certain aesthetics arrive through the characters of instruments, which are "puzzles", according to Stetson. The pizzicato strings are the center-piece of the score used in the orchestral instruments, and pizzicato piano strings are used in certain moments, to evoke "agitated, harsher sounds". Another layer of the score, consisted of arpeggiated saxophone that "create a dreamy, dramatic sincerity to certain things that are emanating from Chef" while he used nyckelharpa, a traditional string instrument from Scandinavia, used in another layer which he played in such a way that traditional instrument players do not recognise. Stetson added:

"It's finding and first identifying what [those pillars are] and then how I can go about doing this in ways that are going to play to expectation and play against expectation in certain ways. That way it can be familiar enough to bring an audience in but unfamiliar enough that they're in some way laid off their guard, put off balance. Then I can maybe try to actually elicit a real emotional response from them rather than let them get caught up in autonomy."

In terms of characteristic musical approach, he added "There is one character that gets most — it's not like the themes are theirs — but they do get most of the very personal interaction with the themes. There are certain things that really belong to certain characters. Then there are overarching themes that I see more as 'the menu,' more as the plan that was set in motion in the very first scene and goes to the very last scene. The majority of the themes are really that and then they interact with certain characters in different ways, given what that character is now privy to or going through at any given moment."

The film has this "polyrhythmic driving sound" which is the DNA of the score. Stetson felt that the score has a "confluence of having a very heartbeat-esque rooted-in-humanity driving pulse to the music, but at the same time, overlaying a rhythmic complexity to create anxiety, disjunctiveness and a sense of being a loft while still tumbling towards something."

== Album information ==
The Menu (Original Motion Picture Soundtrack), containing 14 tracks from Stetson's original score was released by Milan Records on November 18, 2022. "Nature is Timeless" — a track from the score was released on November 7, before the official album release. The album will be released in vinyl editions by Waxwork Records in late-February 2023. The official artwork for the vinyl edition by Waxwork is designed by artist Matt Needle, where the full score will be presented on a 180-gram splatter disc. Pre-orders for the album began on the same date, as the film and soundtrack, and prices for the vinyl edition in rental stores cost around $30.

== Track listing ==
| No. | Title | Length |
|---|---|---|
| 1. | "All Aboard" | 4:24 |
| 2. | "The Boat" | 3:32 |
| 3. | "Nature is Timeless" | 2:42 |
| 4. | "Welcome to Hawthorne" | 2:31 |
| 5. | "A Revolution in Cuisine" | 1:38 |
| 6. | "The Mess" | 3:48 |
| 7. | "Taco Tuesday" | 2:10 |
| 8. | "Our Side or Theirs" | 2:30 |
| 9. | "Fallen Angel" | 2:37 |
| 10. | "Take the Evening Air" | 2:45 |
| 11. | "Do You Think You're Special?" | 3:38 |
| 12. | "The First Cheeseburger You Ever Ate" | 2:44 |
| 13. | "The Purifying Flame" | 5:22 |
| 14. | "Amuse Bouche (Reprise)" | 2:05 |
| Total length: | | 42:26 |

== Reception ==
Filmtracks.com wrote "Don't expect to exit your The Menu listening experience with any of these thematic elements in mind. Rather, the striking polyrhythms of the pretentious portions and the disturbed religious vocals of the late horror will define this score for you. None of this material is meant to be overly pleasant, the rhythmic layers intentionally discordant and the tonality of the choral portions really only redemptively soothing in "The First Cheeseburger You Ever Ate." The score functions adequately for the narrative because its awkward personality matches that of the film, but from a structural standpoint, the thematic core could have experienced a more obvious and satisfying arc within the parameters of these techniques. The 42-minute album shifts without much transition between its three disparate subsections, leaving you hungry for something a little simpler than what's on the menu. Such was likely the point." Christy Lemire of RogerEbert.com said "the taunting and playful score from Colin Stetson enhances the film's rhythm, steadily ratcheting up the tension".

== Accolades ==
| Award | Date of ceremony | Category | Recipient(s) | Result |
|---|---|---|---|---|
| Hollywood Music in Media Awards | November 16, 2022 | Best Original Score in a Horror Film | Colin Stetson | Nominated |
