= New History Warfare Vol. 3: To See More Light =

Studio album by Colin Stetson
- Released: April 29, 2013
- Recorded: Sonovox, Le Petit Eglise, OBORO, Monkey Puzzle Studios, April Base
- Genre: Experimental
- Length: 51:41
- Label: Constellation Records
- Producer: Ben Frost, Colin Stetson

Colin Stetson chronology
New History Warfare Vol. 2: Judges (2011)	New History Warfare Vol. 3: To See More Light (2013)	Never Were the Way She Was (2015)

New History Warfare Vol. 3: To See More Light is the fourth studio album by Canada-based saxophonist Colin Stetson, released by Constellation Records in 2013. It is the final part of a trilogy of albums that also encompasses New History Warfare Vol. 1 (2007) and New History Warfare Vol. 2: Judges (2011).

Stetson, whose contributions to the album were recorded live without overdubs or loops, is the sole musical performer on the album, with Bon Iver's Justin Vernon later providing vocals on four tracks. Production on the album was undertaken by Stetson in collaboration with Ben Frost. New History Warfare Vol. 3: To See More Light was met with critical acclaim upon its release in April 2013 and was shortlisted for the 2013 Polaris Music Prize three months later.

== Background and recording ==
Stetson's original concept for the New History Warfare trilogy was largely skeletal, and developed as the albums were recorded. New History Warfare Vol. 1 was released in 2008 and had a narrative concept of a story of people who had been living at sea for generations. New History Warfare Vol. 2: Judges, released in 2011, told the story of one of these people finally arriving on land. New History Warfare Vol. 3: To See More Light expanded on this, with Stetson stating that "it’s a war story. It’s finding your way to this shining beacon on the mountaintop," and that it "deals with death and love."

Stetson's playing technique includes multiphonics and overblowing, and he uses circular breathing to produce continuous tones without interruption, allowing him to perform an extended stream of notes. The physical and technical demands of this style of playing require Stetson to adhere to a fitness routine that includes running, yoga, breathing exercises and meditation. During the course of his career, his playing proficiency had been developing and each album in the New History Warfare trilogy marked a musical progression from the last. By the time he recorded New History Warfare Vol. 3: To See More Light, Stetson's playing capability had improved to such a level that he claimed "there’s almost nothing in there that I could have played when I recorded Vol. 2."

Stetson's parts on Vol. 3 were performed and recorded live without overdubs or loops in various studios in Montreal, where he had wanted to use the large rooms to provide more reverb. Using an arrangement of microphones placed in strategic places including on the side of the saxophone, on his own throat, hanging from the ceiling and at different points around the studio, Stetson captured not only the sounds of the instrument but also the percussive sound of the keys and the sounds of his own breathing and vocalizing through the horn. Producer Ben Frost, whom Stetson had previously worked with on New History Warfare Vol. 2: Judges, mixed between fifteen and twenty recordings of the same performance into a cohesive piece of music at Greenhouse Studios in Iceland. The vocals of Justin Vernon were recorded at April Base studios in Fall Creek, Wisconsin, and were overdubbed later in the recording process.

== Musical content ==
New History Warfare Vol. 3: To See More Light contains eleven tracks with a total running time of fifty-two minutes. Ten tracks were written by Stetson, with three of these featuring additional writing from Justin Vernon. The track "What are They Doing in Heaven Today?" is a cover version of a gospel song written by Charles Albert Tindley in 1901 and recorded by Washington Phillips in 1928.

Stetson has stated that the songs are "based in traditional American song," and the music was described by AllMusic reviewer Fred Thomas as containing "elements of jazz, modern composition, and... aspects of repetition and textural drone found in certain branches of electronic music and noise." Fact called the album "a rich, multi-layered sonic world" and noted that the presence of Vernon's vocals meant that "Stetson’s approach feels considerably poppier this time around." Pitchfork opined that Stetson has "plowed a unique path through the music landscape in the last five years," stating that "his music is heady but always rooted in the body." Jeremy D. Larson concurred with this idea, claiming that Stetson's music is "alien but human, technically astounding but filled with passion – the saxophone acts as a medium of expression tied to his whole body", but admitted that "to most ears, Stetson’s music is hard to classify." Reviewer Daniel Paton also found classification of the music difficult, saying that it "doesn’t really meet even the most open-minded definitions of jazz, neither is it really an example of free improvised music."

In his review for Drowned in Sound, Alexander Tudor observed the album's "abrasiveness, brute force, and determination to push the instrument to its limits," describing a "relentless pummelling of metal in motion; often aggressive or chaotic, but using scales to evoke a sense of discipline" while noting that Stetson was "equally at home with classical minimalism." Exclaim! reviewer Vincent Pollard noted how Vol. 3 "organically and coherently blends Stetson's avant-garde playing and dark, complex themes with accessible and compelling compositions," while MusicOMH commented that Stetson was "finding guttural, fuzzy, violent sounds from his saxophone... but also finding a disarming warmth where necessary." In his review for No Ripcord, Stephen Wragg stated that "there’s such a polyphonic richness to these recordings that it sounds, at times, like five people are present" and noted that the techniques employed in the recording of the album "creates this heady, vertiginous rush – adrenaline-inducing in its deftness; and that’s an effect that strikes me as incredibly difficult to recreate in music." Spin's Richard Gehr suggested that the music was "densely multiphonic, often claustrophobic, and reeks of fear and flight" but that it "offers at least a slight sense of salvation," and concluded that the final album in the trilogy was "music of the moment, a work of granular epiphanies that accrete, finally, into a magnificent whole."

== Release ==
At the announcement of the album in January 2013, the track "High Above a Grey Green Sea" was made available for streaming on the Constellation Records SoundCloud website. In March, four more tracks from the album ("And in Truth", "Hunted", "Who the Waves Are Roaring For" and "Part of Me Apart From You") were able to be streamed following their premiere on the Belgian radio station Radio Scorpio. A short film made to accompany the tracks "In Mirrors" and "And in Truth" was released on 5 April 2013, directed by Kurtis Hough, Dan Huiting and Tabb Firchau.

New History Warfare Vol. 3: To See More Light was released on 29 April 2013 in Europe and the following day in North America. The album was released on compact disc, 180g vinyl and digital download. Following the release of the album, a promotional video was made for the track "Who the Waves Are Roaring For", created by videographers Isaac Gale and David Jensen.

In July 2013, New History Warfare Vol. 3: To See More Light was shortlisted for the Polaris Music Prize, which was Stetson's second nomination for the award after Vol. 2: Judges in 2011.

== Reception ==
Professional ratings
Aggregate scores
Source	Rating
Metacritic	81/100
Review scores
Source	Rating
AllMusic	4/5 stars
Consequence of Sound	4.5/5 stars
Drowned in Sound	8/10
Exclaim!	10/10
FACT	3.5/5 stars
musicOMH	4.5/5 stars
No Ripcord	7/10
Pitchfork	8.1/10
Spin	8/10
Tom Hull – on the Web	A−

New History Warfare Vol. 3: To See More Light was met with widespread critical acclaim. At Metacritic, which assigns a weighted average score out of 100 to reviews and ratings from mainstream critics, the album has received a metascore of 81, based on 18 reviews.

AllMusic rated New History Warfare Vol. 3: To See More Light four stars out of five with reviewer Fred Thomas commenting that "Stetson explores scorched landscapes and heavenly scenes alike with his stylized playing." In his review for Consequence of Sound, Jeremy D. Larson lauded Stetson's album as "his strongest and most cohesive collection in his career" and suggested that "you’ve never heard anything like it", giving a mark of four-and-a-half stars out of five. Vol. 3 received an eight out of ten review from Drowned in Sound, where Alexander Tudor found the album to be "essential listening and another triumph." Exclaim! magazine's Vincent Pollard awarded the album a perfect ten out of ten score, praising its "accessible and compelling compositions" and dubbing it a "masterpiece." Angus Finlayson of FACT magazine was more critical, rating the album three-and-a-half out of five and commenting that Vernon's vocals "run the risk of taming Stetson’s playing."

A favorable review from musicOMH's Daniel Paton described Vol. 3's "unpredictable and challenging but frequently awe-inspiring terrain" and gave the album four-and-a-half stars out of five. No Ripcord reviewer Stephen Wragg was less impressed, rating it a seven out of ten, but offered that the album was "stacked with jaw-dropping moments, underpinned by seismic emotional shifts." Mark Richardson, writing for Pitchfork, awarded Vol. 3 8.1 out of 10 and noted Stetson's "impressive achievement" before concluding that "the result is a sound that could come only from one person on earth." Spin magazine's Richard Gehr described the music as "peerless at conveying isolation, loneliness, and alienation" and scored the album eight out of ten. Rob Young of The Wire praised the album's "extraordinary aural illusionism", noting that Stetson's playing technique finds "timbres in the saxophone's tubing that are rarely brought out."

Jazz critic Tom Hull said there is "nothing else quite like it", highlighting the eerie quality provided by Vernon's overdubbed vocals and the live, versatile playing of Stetson: "[He] plays everything from alto down but favors the big bass sax, and makes extensive use of circular breathing, which gives his tones resonance and a warbly rhythm".

== Track listing ==
All songs written by Colin Stetson except where noted.

No.	Title	Writer(s)	Length
1.	"And in Truth"	Colin Stetson, Justin Vernon	1:34
2.	"Hunted"		5:51
3.	"High Above a Grey Green Sea"		4:26
4.	"In Mirrors"		1:26
5.	"Brute"	Stetson, Vernon	2:55
6.	"Among the Sef (Righteous II)"		4:36
7.	"Who the Waves Are Roaring For (Hunted II)"	Stetson, Vernon	4:08
8.	"To See More Light"		15:09
9.	"What Are They Doing in Heaven Today?"	Washington Phillips	3:36
10.	"This Bed of Shattered Bone"		2:09
11.	"Part of Me Apart From You"		5:51

== Personnel ==
Performers

- Colin Stetson – alto saxophone, tenor saxophone, bass saxophone, vocals, production
- Justin Vernon – vocals

Recording personnel

- Mell Dettmer – mastering
- Ben Frost – mixing, production
- Jon Ottosen – mixing
- Vid Cousins – recording
- Marcus Paquin – recording
- BJ Burton – recording
- Brian Joseph – recording
- Mark Lawson – engineering, recording

Additional personnel

- Tracy Maurice – artwork, design
- Matt Moroz – artwork, design
