= The Iron Claw (soundtrack) =

2023 soundtrack album by Richard Reed Parry

The Iron Claw (Original Motion Picture Soundtrack)

Soundtrack album by Richard Reed Parry
- Released: December 22, 2023
- Genres: Contemporary classical; film score
- Length: 43:25
- Label: A24 Music
- Producer: Pietro Amato

Richard Reed Parry chronology
Eileen (2023)	The Iron Claw (2023)	First Sounds (2024)

The Iron Claw (Original Motion Picture Soundtrack) is the soundtrack album composed by Richard Reed Parry for the 2023 biographical sports drama film The Iron Claw, written and directed by Sean Durkin. The soundtrack was digitally released by A24 Music on December 22, 2023, the same day as the film's theatrical release in the United States.

== Background ==
Composer Richard Reed Parry had previously worked with director Sean Durkin, scoring Durkin's 2020 film The Nest, his first solo film score. Parry had previously been exposed to film scoring when his band Arcade Fire composed the music for the 2013 film Her by Spike Jonze.

== Composition ==
Early in production, Durkin sent Parry a playlist he had been listening to while writing the film, including songs by Tom Petty, Blue Öyster Cult, Rush, George Harrison, and Bruce Springsteen. Initially, the only specific direction Durkin gave Parry was that he wanted the score to include "big drums." At his studio, Parry began writing and recording "power rock" instrumentals that he thought would fit the feel of the film. However, after viewing a first cut of the film and realizing how heavy it was, Durkin abandoned his "big drums" idea and Parry began composing more "claustrophobic and eerie" pieces featuring French horn, upright bass, and orchestral drums.

Parry and his wife Laurel Sprengelmeyer wrote an original song for the film called "Live That Way Forever", although it was not included on the soundtrack album. It instead received a separate digital release on January 3, 2024. When Parry and Sprengelmeyer first played the song for Durkin, Durkin immediately loved it and rewrote portions of the film to accommodate its inclusion. In the film, the song is performed by Stanley Simons, who plays Mike Von Erich. The song also plays during the film credits.

== Track listing ==
The Iron Claw (Original Motion Picture Soundtrack) track listing
No.	Title	Length
1.	"The Claw"	2:16
2.	"The Bent Ear"	1:52
3.	"C'est Shiek"	3:09
4.	"Harley Race"	1:20
5.	"Update Desk"	0:35
6.	"The Main Event"	0:45
7.	"Down and Out"	1:00
8.	"Whippin' Disks, Lifting Forth"	3:09
9.	"The Von Erich Curse"	1:03
10.	"The Funeral"	2:33
11.	"Getting in the Ring"	3:01
12.	"Alone in the Office"	1:49
13.	"Relentless Loss"	2:10
14.	"Sleeping at the Office"	1:56
15.	"Flair Fight"	2:52
16.	"Elemental Home"	2:16
17.	"Kerry and Fritz"	1:20
18.	"The Family is Changing"	3:12
19.	"I Used to Be a Brother"	2:47
20.	"Emerging Heroes"	4:10
Total length:		43:25

== Release history ==
Release history and formats for The Iron Claw (Original Motion Picture Soundtrack)
Region	Date	Format(s)	Label(s)	Ref.
Various	December 22, 2023	Digital download; streaming	A24 Music	
