= Reflektor =

2013 studio album by Arcade Fire

Studio album by Arcade Fire
- Released: October 28, 2013
- Recorded: 2011–2013
- Studios: Sonovox (Montreal); Trident Castle (Port Antonio); Dockside (Maurice, Louisiana); Breakglass (Montreal); Golden Ratio (Montreal); Pierre Marchand (Montreal)
- Genres: Art rock; dance-rock
- Length: 75:09
- Languages: English; French
- Labels: Sonovox; Merge
- Producers: Arcade Fire; James Murphy; Markus Dravs

Arcade Fire chronology
| The Suburbs (2010) | Reflektor (2013) | Everything Now (2017) |

Singles from Reflektor
- 1. "Reflektor" Released: September 9, 2013; 2. "Afterlife" Released: September 28, 2013; 3. "We Exist" Released: May 26, 2014; 4. "You Already Know" Released: August 22, 2014; 5. "Get Right" Released: September 25, 2015

Reflektor is the fourth studio album by the Canadian indie rock band Arcade Fire, released on October 28, 2013, through Sonovox Records internationally and Merge Records in the United States. A double album, it was recorded between 2011 and 2013 at studios in Montreal, Jamaica, and Louisiana. It was co-produced by LCD Soundsystem frontman James Murphy, regular Arcade Fire producer Markus Dravs, and the band themselves.

Influenced by Haitian rara music, the 1959 film Black Orpheus, and Søren Kierkegaard's essay "Two Ages", Reflektor's release was preceded by a guerrilla marketing campaign inspired by veve drawings and the release of the title track as a limited edition single credited to the fictional band The Reflektors on September 9, 2013. Upon its release, Reflektor received positive reviews from music critics and had a successful commercial performance. The album was recognized as one of The 100 Best Albums of the Decade So Far, a list published by Pitchfork in August 2014.

== Background ==
The album's origins stem from a trip that both vocalist/guitarist Win Butler and multi-instrumentalist Régine Chassagne took to her family's home country of Haiti. Butler said: "Going to Haiti for the first time with Régine was the beginning of a major change in the way that I thought about the world. Usually, I think you have most of your musical influences locked down by the time you're 16. There was a band I [feel] changed me musically, just really opened me up to this huge, vast amount of culture and influence I hadn't been exposed to before, which was really life-changing." Inspired by the country's rara music, Butler and Chassagne incorporated elements of this sound into the band's new material, alongside Jamaican influences. Butler stated, "I mean, it's not like our band trying to play Haitian music. I just felt like we were opened up to a new influence. Bob Marley probably felt the same way the first time he heard Curtis Mayfield." According to the band's manager Scott Rodger, the album cost $1.6 million to make.

== Recording ==
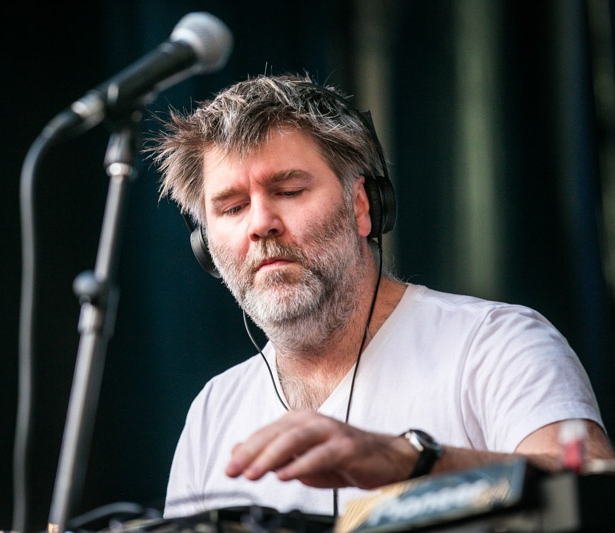
James Murphy co-produced Reflektor.

Recording in Louisiana, the band began work on Reflektor in 2011, and subsequently moved to Jamaica the following year with producer Markus Dravs. Working on roughly sixty song ideas, the band wrote and recorded in an abandoned castle, named Trident: "The castle was built in 1979, or something, by this eccentric Jamaican dude who just wanted to hang out with royalty. And it kind of worked. After about five years he couldn't afford to pay the bill, so it had been sitting empty for many years. I met a dude who was planning on turning it into a hotel, so we just rented it off him for cheap and there was nothing in there. We brought in some beds and a piano and some gear." The album was mostly recorded on analog tape.

In August 2012, the band also began working with producer and LCD Soundsystem frontman James Murphy, whom the band had been wanting to work with for over six years. Butler: "LCD Soundsystem to me is like New Order and the B-52's and we deeply share a lot of those influences, and we did completely different things with it. Régine is kind of the person who dances. At any given minute, if you can get Régine to dance, you're kind of on the right track, so I think we just wanted to make a record that Régine could dance to."

Regarding the band's decision to record a double album, Win Butler stated, "The record is really long. We intended to make a short record and we ended up with 18 songs that were all between six and eight minutes and we were like, 'Uh oh, I think we screwed up making a short record.' Splitting it over the two halves enables you to get into the different worlds of the records." According to Butler, 50 or 60 songs were written for the album.

== Writing and composition ==
Reflektor is an art rock and dance-rock album. Primary lyricist Win Butler notes that the 1959 film Black Orpheus inspired his lyrics on the album, in particular its themes of isolation and death: "Black Orpheus is one of my favorite films of all time, which is set in Carnival in Brazil. The Orpheus myth is the original love triangle, Romeo and Juliet kind of story. Lyrically, it's not literally about my life. I feel like I'm kind of a bit of a sponge in a way. Like, if people around me are going through things, I find it very hard not to be empathetic." Also influential to the album's lyrical content is an essay by Danish philosopher Søren Kierkegaard, entitled "Two Ages". Butler states, "[It's] about the reflective age. This is like in 1846, and it sounds like he's talking about modern times. He's talking about the press and alienation, and you kind of read it and you're like, 'Dude, you have no idea how insane it's gonna get.'"

The album tracks, "Here Comes the Night Time" and "Here Comes the Night Time II", each appear on the album's respective halves, with Butler noting, "The second one was actually written first and it almost starts the second half of the record – kind of like after the [Haitian] Carnival. Both of them are very much influenced by when the sun is just starting to go down in Port au Prince, and it's really intense because most of the city doesn't have electricity so everyone is just racing to get home before dark." The first of the two tracks references missionaries, in part: "The absurdity that you can go to a place like Haiti and teach people something about God. Like, the opposite really seems to be true, in my experience."

The track "Supersymmetry" was originally written for the film Her, which the band was composing simultaneously while working on Reflektor. A different version of the song appears during the film's end credits. The instrumentals and theme of "Porno" are featured throughout the movie as well.

The lyrics include singing in both English and French.

== Promotional campaign ==
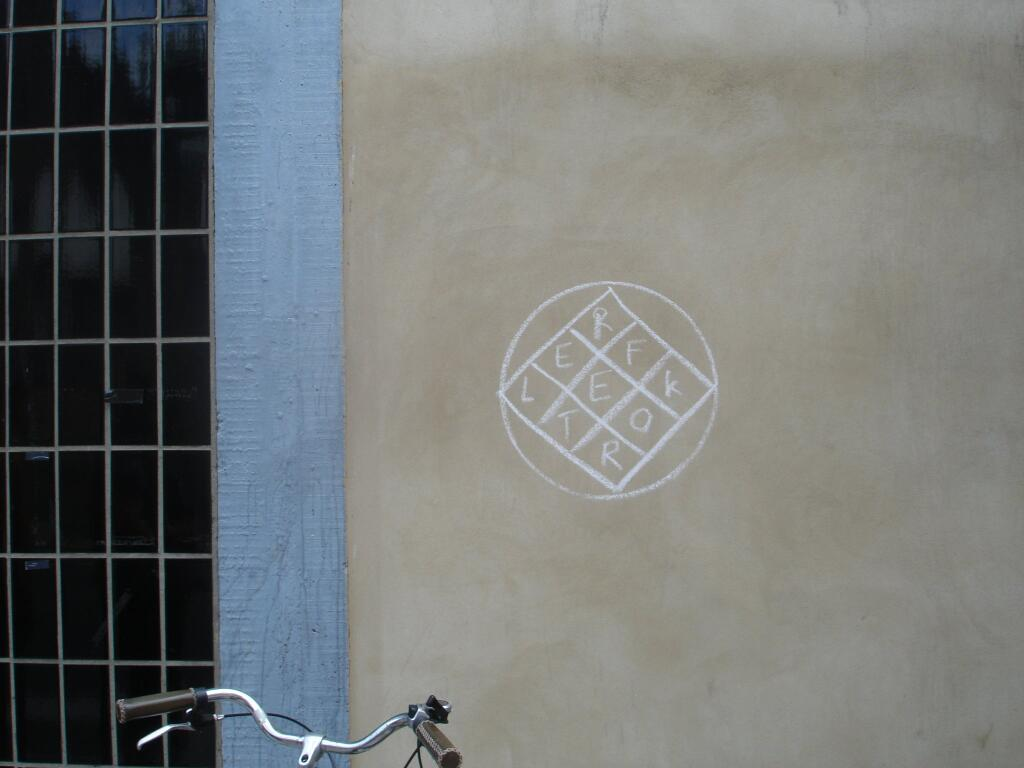
Reflektor graffiti in London.

In early August, a cryptic logo, which incorporated the word "reflektor", appeared on the walls of cities around the world. The street art was reported to be part of a guerrilla marketing campaign for the new Arcade Fire album. The upcoming album and its release date had already been announced via a message on Twitter, written as a reply to a single fan. An Instagram account posted pictures of the symbol, and included a video of one being drawn.

On August 26, Arcade Fire confirmed that the work was related to them, with a large mural on a building in downtown Manhattan, which included four of the symbols and the words "Arcade Fire 9pm 9/9". On September 9, 2013, the band released two videos for the first single and title track from the album. Win Butler later wrote that the Reflektor graffiti was inspired by Haitian veve drawings.

The Reflektor campaign received negative publicity when an article that appeared in Slate in September 2013 depicted instances of property damage that resulted from the advertisements. The band made an apology, explaining that the viral wall stencils were meant to use chalk or other washable media, rather than spray paint, nor binding glues under the paper advertisements.

The build-up to the release of the album was described by Pitchfork as "unusual, ambitious, vague, confounding, a little heavy-handed, and very successful". It was compared to similar campaigns for albums by Daft Punk and Kanye West, also released in 2013. In such campaigns, the music itself becomes one part of a wider experience. Although the events surrounding the album's release take place in the real world, their impermanence suits the use of social media, where the campaign is documented and shared. In an interview, Butler stated that he enjoyed anticipating the release of an album, and that the build-up to the release of Reflektor felt like "a weird art project" or "throwing a good party".

== Artwork ==
The album's artwork incorporates an image of Auguste Rodin's sculpture of Orpheus and Eurydice, taken by Joseph Coscia Jr. at the Metropolitan Museum of Art.

== Release ==
The band released a 15-second music clip on Spotify on September 2, 2013, titled "9pm 9/9" under the album name Reflektor. On September 9, 2013, the band announced a last-minute secret show under the name "The Reflektors" at Montreal's Salsathèque Club, at 9PM for $9. Following the band's September 28 appearance on Saturday Night Live, a 30-minute concert special aired on NBC featuring cameos including Rainn Wilson, Bono, Ben Stiller, James Franco, Michael Cera and Zach Galifianakis. The band debuted three tracks, "Here Comes the Night Time", "We Exist" and "Normal Person". On October 12 the band released a teaser video containing thirty seconds of the song "Awful Sound (Oh Eurydice)". On October 21, the song "Afterlife" was debuted in a music video, playing over edited clips of Marcel Camus's 1959 film Black Orpheus. On October 21, the song "Normal Person" aired on The Colbert Report, with the band identified not as Arcade Fire but only as "The Reflektors". On October 24, a lyric video for the Official Reflektor Full Album Teaser, playing over longer clips of Marcel Camus's 1959 film Black Orpheus was posted to the band's website.

In September 2015, a digital Deluxe edition was released. It featured five new tracks that did not make it on the original album, as well as a new remixed version of "Flashbulb Eyes" by Dennis Bovell featuring Linton Kwesi Johnson. "Get Right" was released as a single. These tracks were also released physically on cassette as The Reflektor Tapes.

== Reception ==
=== Critical reception ===
Professional ratings
Aggregate scores
| Source | Rating |
|---|---|
| AnyDecentMusic? | 7.4/10 |
| Metacritic | 80/100 |
Review scores
| Source | Rating |
| AllMusic | 3.5/5 stars |
| The A.V. Club | B |
| The Daily Telegraph | 4/5 stars |
| Entertainment Weekly | B |
| The Guardian | 3/5 stars |
| The Independent | 4/5 stars |
| NME | 8/10 |
| Pitchfork | 9.2/10 |
| Rolling Stone | 4.5/5 stars |
| Spin | 8/10 |

Reflektor received generally favorable reviews from music critics. At Metacritic, which assigns a normalized rating out of 100 to reviews from mainstream critics, the album received an average score of 80 based on 48 reviews, indicating "generally favorable reviews". David Fricke of Rolling Stone called the album "a perfect summary of their group's still-fervent indie-born hunger after a decade of mainstream success" and, noting its "decisive, indulgent ambition", cited it as "the best album Arcade Fire have ever made". Lindsay Zoladz of Pitchfork described it as "a triumph, but not a victory lap; the band never sounds content enough for that." USA Today stated that on the album, "much of the music — audacious, heavily distorted and bubbling with electronics — sounds magnificently fresh. As the ensemble shape-shifts from the cleaner rock template of The Suburbs and Neon Bible to exotic beat-driven mashups, Arcade owes a debt to David Bowie (who has a brief cameo) and Achtung-era U2. Co-producer James Murphy of LCD Soundsystem also brings his rhythmic chops to the mix in dizzying dance hybrids." Emily Mackay of The Quietus notes that "the question of what comes next, though, isn't one that Arcade Fire need fear any longer. With Reflektor, they've answered it strongly. Four albums in, their sound glitters with many facets and possibilities – they can be proud of how it reflects on them."

Kitty Empire of The Observer was impressed by the album's production and songwriting, but felt that "every track outstays its welcome by a couple of minutes", resulting in Reflektor not being an "astonishing album", but "merely very, very good one instead." In a mixed review, PopMatters journalist J. C. Maçek III said "Reflektor doesn't contain any actually bad songs (the closest we can peg on the collection would be a small amount of filler material), but the impact of a full listen is one of catchy excitement and impressive pop rock which slowly rolls downhill into the murky sonic depths of the more somber second half without any truly punctuating final moment of the record itself." Simon Goddard of Q wrote that Reflektor fails to "fully justify the size of it and it doesn't end so much as unravel" and "is proof you really can have too much of a good thing."

=== Accolades ===
Rolling Stone ranked the album at No. 5 on their "50 Best Albums of 2013" list, writing that the fact that album has the "ability to provoke actual feelings is what makes this great." Stereogum ranked Reflektor at number ten on their "The 50 Best Albums of 2013" list, stating: "[Reflektor is] the record that Arcade Fire didn't need to risk making, but they did anyway and we're lucky to have it. This is an album that sets a new milestone. From now on, we're listening to a post-Reflektor Arcade Fire, and they've never been more exciting." Drowned in Sound placed Reflektor 5th in their favorite albums of the year list, despite initially giving the album a negative review. 17 music journalists of the Polish media company Agora SA (Gazeta Wyborcza, Gazeta.pl, TOK FM) placed Reflektor at number one in their ranking of 10 Best Foreign Albums of 2013.

The album was shortlisted nominee for the 2014 Polaris Music Prize.

The album was nominated at the 57th Grammy Awards for Best Alternative Music Album, whilst the track "We Exist" was additionally nominated for Best Music Video.

| Publication | Rank | List |
|---|---|---|
| Consequence of Sound | 7 | Top 50 Albums of 2013 |
| Drowned in Sound | 5 | Drowned in Sound's Favorite Albums of 2013 |
| Gazeta Wyborcza | 1 | 10 Best Foreign Albums of 2013 |
| The Line of Best Fit | 15 | Best Fit Fifty: Albums of 2013 |
| NME | 7 | 50 Best Records of 2013 |
| Rolling Stone | 5 | 50 Best Albums of 2013 |
| Stereogum | 10 | The 50 Best Albums of 2013 |
| Pitchfork | 10 | Top 50 Albums of 2013 |

While Pitchfork recognized the album among the decade's "best albums ... so far" in 2014, Reflektor ultimately did not make their list of the best 200 albums of the 2010s.

== Track listing ==
Disc one
| No. | Title | Producer(s) | Length |
|---|---|---|---|
| 0. | "[untitled]" ( (Note: The compact disc release of Reflektor features a hidden track in the pregap of "Reflektor"; the track is an experimental piece consisting of a reversed sequence of alternate takes and uniquely remixed stems of the album's songs.)) | Arcade Fire | 10:02 |
| 1. | "Reflektor" | Arcade Fire; James Murphy; Markus Dravs; Mark Lawson^{[a]} | 7:34 |
| 2. | "We Exist" | Arcade Fire; Murphy; Dravs | 5:43 |
| 3. | "Flashbulb Eyes" | Arcade Fire; Lawson^{[a]} | 2:42 |
| 4. | "Here Comes the Night Time" | Arcade Fire; Murphy; Dravs; Lawson^{[a]} | 6:30 |
| 5. | "Normal Person" | Arcade Fire; Murphy; Dravs | 4:22 |
| 6. | "You Already Know" | Arcade Fire; Murphy; Dravs | 3:59 |
| 7. | "Joan of Arc" ( (Note: On the compact disc release, "Joan of Arc" ends with 30 additional seconds of the room tone that also opens "Here Comes the Night Time II".)) | Arcade Fire; Murphy; Dravs | 5:24 |
| Total length: | | | 46:05 |

Disc two
| No. | Title | Producer(s) | Length |
|---|---|---|---|
| 1. | "Here Comes the Night Time II" | Arcade Fire | 2:51 |
| 2. | "Awful Sound (Oh Eurydice)" | Arcade Fire; Murphy; Dravs | 6:13 |
| 3. | "It's Never Over (Hey Orpheus)" | Arcade Fire; Murphy | 6:42 |
| 4. | "Porno" | Arcade Fire; Murphy | 6:02 |
| 5. | "Afterlife" | Arcade Fire; Murphy; Dravs | 5:52 |
| 6. | "Supersymmetry" | Arcade Fire; Murphy | 11:16 |
| Total length: | | | 38:56 |

Disc three – only on deluxe digital edition and limited cassette edition
| No. | Title | Producer(s) | Length |
|---|---|---|---|
| 1. | "Apocrypha" | Arcade Fire | 5:18 |
| 2. | "Women of a Certain Age" | Arcade Fire | 3:16 |
| 3. | "Flashbulb Eyes" (Dennis Bovell remix featuring Linton Kwesi Johnson) | Arcade Fire; Lawson^{[a]} | 2:49 |
| 4. | "Soft Power" | Arcade Fire; Dravs | 5:43 |
| 5. | "Get Right" | Arcade Fire; Dravs; Murphy | 4:41 |
| 6. | "Crucified Again" | Arcade Fire | 5:03 |
| Total length: | | | 26:40 |

Notes

- ^{^[a]} signifies an additional producer
- "We Exist" is the second track of the album on CD and digital releases, but the fourth on the vinyl version (as the first song of Side B, or 1:4).

== Personnel ==
Personnel adapted from album liner notes.

=== Arcade Fire ===
- Win Butler – lead vocals, rhythm guitar, electric bass, piano, synthesizers, banjo and mandolin
- Régine Chassagne – lead and backing vocals, synthesizers, piano, accordion, xylophone, hurdy-gurdy, drums, elephant's trunk, recorders and percussion, ting-tong
- Richard Reed Parry – rhythm and lead guitars, piano, synthesizers, organ, xylophone, accordion, electric and upright bass, celeste, drums, backing vocals & percussion
- Tim Kingsbury – rhythm guitar, electric and upright bass, piano, synthesizers and backing vocals
- Will Butler – rhythm guitar, electric and upright bass, synthesizers, piano, sitar, trombone, clarinet, panpipes, glockenspiel, musical saw, omnichord, concertina, backing vocals, percussion and gadulka
- Jeremy Gara – drums, rhythm guitar, piano, synthesizers and percussion

=== Additional musicians ===
- Sarah Neufeld – strings, orchestral arrangements, backing vocals, vocals, synthesizers, piano
- Owen Pallett – orchestral arrangements, strings, piano
- Marika Anthony-Shaw – strings
- FILMharmonic Orchestra Prague – orchestra
- Colin Stetson – horn arrangements, saxophones
- Stuart Bogie – saxophones
- Willinson Duprate – additional percussion
- Verrieux Zile – additional percussion
- Baptiste Jean Nazaire – additional percussion
- Wilkenson Magloire – additional percussion
- Dieuveut Marc Thelus – additional percussion
- Wichemond Thelus – additional percussion
- Kid Koala – sample manipulation (1.1)
- David Bowie – vocals (1.1)
- Jonathan Ross – vocal sample (1.6 and 3.1)

=== Recording personnel ===
- Arcade Fire – production, mixing (1.3 and 2.1)
- James Murphy – production (except tracks 1.3 and 2.1), additional recording, mixing (2.2 and 2.6)
- Markus Dravs – production (except tracks 1.3, 2.1, 2.3, 2.4 and 2.6), additional recording
- Mark Lawson – recording, additional production (1.1, 1.3 and 1.4)
- Korey Richey – recording, mixing assistant
- Tom Elmhirst – additional recording, mixing (1.1, 1.2, 1.4, 1.7, 2.3 and 2.5)
- Damian Taylor – additional recording
- Pascal Shefteshy – additional recording
- David Farrell – recording assistant
- Eric Heigle – recording assistant
- Craig Silvey – mixing (1.2, 1.5, 1.6 and 2.4)
- Mark Lawson – mixing (1.3 and 2.1)
- Matt Shaw – mixing assistant
- Ben Baptie – mixing assistant
- Joe Visciano – mixing assistant
- Eduardo de la Paz – mixing assistant
- Ted Jensen – mastering

=== Artwork ===
- Caroline Robert – album artwork, photography
- Korey Richey – photography

== Commercial performance ==
The album debuted at number one on the Canadian Albums Chart, selling 49,000 copies. This marks an increase from their previous album's debut week. The album sold 101,000 copies in Canada in 2013.

In the US, the album also reached number one on the Billboard 200, with 140,000 copies sold in its first week, according to Nielsen SoundScan. It was the third best-selling vinyl album in the US in 2013, selling 31,000 copies. As of December 2014, Reflektor has sold 367,000 copies total in the US.

The album debuted at number one in the UK with sales of 45,252.

== Charts ==
=== Weekly charts ===
| Chart (2013) | Peak position |
|---|---|
| Australian Albums (ARIA) | 3 |
| Austrian Albums (Ö3 Austria) | 4 |
| Belgian Albums (Ultratop Flanders) | 1 |
| Belgian Albums (Ultratop Wallonia) | 2 |
| Canadian Albums (Billboard) | 1 |
| Danish Albums (Hitlisten) | 4 |
| Dutch Albums (Album Top 100) | 6 |
| Finnish Albums (Suomen virallinen lista) | 8 |
| French Albums (SNEP) | 3 |
| German Albums (Offizielle Top 100) | 6 |
| Hungarian Albums (MAHASZ) | 27 |
| Irish Albums (IRMA) | 1 |
| Italian Albums (FIMI) | 8 |
| New Zealand Albums (RMNZ) | 5 |
| Norwegian Albums (VG-lista) | 3 |
| Polish Albums (ZPAV) | 19 |
| Portuguese Albums (AFP) | 1 |
| Scottish Albums (Official Charts) | 1 |
| Spanish Albums (Promusicae) | 4 |
| Swedish Albums (Sverigetopplistan) | 9 |
| Swiss Albums (Schweizer Hitparade) | 4 |
| UK Albums (Official Charts) | 1 |
| US Billboard 200 | 1 |
| US Top Rock Albums (Billboard) | 1 |

=== Year-end charts ===
| Chart (2013) | Position |
|---|---|
| Belgian Albums (Ultratop Flanders) | 44 |
| Belgian Albums (Ultratop Wallonia) | 107 |
| Canadian Albums (Billboard) | 23 |
| UK Albums (OCC) | 97 |
| French Albums (SNEP) | 117 |
| US Billboard 200 | 135 |
| US Top Alternative Albums (Billboard) | 21 |
| US Top Rock Albums (Billboard) | 30 |

| Chart (2014) | Position |
|---|---|
| Canadian Albums (Billboard) | 25 |
| US Billboard 200 | 140 |
| US Top Alternative Albums (Billboard) | 18 |
| US Top Rock Albums (Billboard) | 29 |

== Certifications ==
| Region | Certification | Certified units/sales |
|---|---|---|
| Canada (Music Canada) | 4× Platinum | 320,000^{‡} |
| France (SNEP) | Gold | 55,000 |
| United Kingdom (BPI) | Gold | 156,414 |
| United States | — | 367,000 |
^{‡} Sales+streaming figures based on certification alone.
