= La Rouge (album) =

Studio album by Torngat
- Released: 2005
- Recorded: 2004 at The Farm
- Genre: Instrumental
- Producer: Torngat

Torngat chronology
Live at the Bread Factory (2004)	La Rouge (2005)	You Could Be (2007)

Professional ratings
Review scores
Source	Rating
The Montreal Mirror	(not rated)
Kevchino	9/10

La Rouge is the third release of the Montreal-based instrumental act Torngat.

== Track listing ==
No.	Title	Length
1.	"Nouvelle France"	7:05
2.	"Bell Dust"	1:22
3.	"Alberta Song"	5:49
4.	"La rouge"	5:43
5.	"Bye Bye Sly"	4:58
Total length:		24:57
