= Eileen (soundtrack) =

Film score by Richard Reed Parry
- Released: December 1, 2023
- Recorded: 2023
- Genre: Film score
- Length: 56:58
- Label: Milan
- Producer: Richard Reed Parry

Richard Reed Parry chronology
The Nest (2020)	Eileen (2023)	The Iron Claw (2023)

Eileen is the original motion picture soundtrack to the 2023 film of the same name directed by William Oldroyd, starring Anne Hathaway and Thomasin McKenzie. The film's score is composed by Arcade Fire multi-instrumentalist Richard Reed Parry that consisted of 18 tracks and an original song written specifically for the film. Milan Records released the soundtrack on December 1, 2023.

== Development ==
Eileen is Parry's second composition for a feature film after The Nest (2020). Oldroyd being a fan of Arcade Fire's works, watched the film and eventually liked Parry's work, who thought that the music was exquisite. After the film's production, Oldroyd sent Parry an assembled edit that consisted of the last ten minutes of the film, without dialogues, and insisted him to score in its entirety. He eventually liked it and wrote few cues. Oldroyd gave him freedom on writing specific music but also wanted to keep the spirit of the 1960s, adding that "He [Parry] played with the themes and the tone of the film, which treads a fine line between humour and darkness." The score for Bernard Herrmann's Taxi Driver (1976) served as the reference point for the film's music.

== Reception ==
Anna Bogutskaya of Time Out described the soundtrack as "spectacularly jarring", while David Rooney of The Hollywood Reporter described it as "wonderfully arch". Jessica Kiang of Variety wrote "Richard Reed Parry’s superb jazz score, manages to be both sultry and impatient as it moves from discordant passages to sweetly tuneful resolves". Amber Wilkinson of Screen International wrote "Richard Reed Parry’s jazz-inflected score adds to the increasingly noir vibe." Shayna Maci Warner of Paste wrote "Richard Reed Parry’s score cracks and swings like the tenuous icicles that decorate Eileen’s front door." Ryan Lattanzio of IndieWire wrote "Richard Reed Parry’s score, mixing jazz with more shivery ominous orchestral arrangements, amply abets the movie’s toxic pull." Kevin Ibbotson-Wight of The Wee Review wrote "Scored with a serpentine jazzy swing by Richard Reed Parry that sweeps from heady romantic longing through to insistent, threatening noirish throb it nods back to old Hollywood glamour and Hitchcockian thrills." Jordan Raup of The Film Stage wrote "Richard Reed Parry’s jazzy score amps up like a crutch to hit the finish line, one that comes across unfinished and unsatisfying."

== Track listing ==
Eileen track listing
No.	Title	Length
1.	"Eileen"	0:33
2.	"Prison Guard Fantasy"	1:14
3.	"Driving Home"	1:32
4.	"Shoes in Trunk"	1:26
5.	"Eyes Meet"	1:14
6.	"Dad is Drunk on the Street"	5:08
7.	"Photos in the Office"	1:46
8.	"They Kiss"	1:30
9.	"Hungover and Late"	3:34
10.	"Prison Visit"	2:12
11.	"Office Car Fantasy"	2:48
12.	"Hospital"	1:33
13.	"Hushed"	3:03
14.	"Pivotal Moment"	5:56
15.	"Basement Confession"	2:57
16.	"Basement to House"	5:59
17.	"Fake Escape"	1:31
18.	"Leaving"	9:47
19.	"All These Things" (Art Neville)	3:15
Total length:		56:58
