= We (2018 film) =

2018 film by Rene Eller

- Film poster
- Dutch: Wij
- Directed by: Rene Eller
- Written by: Rene Eller
- Based on: Wij by Elvis Peeters
- Produced by: Rene Eller; Julius Ponten
- Starring: Aimé Claeys; Tijmen Govaerts; Pauline Casteleyn; Maxime Jacobs; Friso van der Werf
- Cinematography: Maxime Desmet
- Edited by: Wouter van Luijn
- Music by: Colin Stetson
- Production companies: Pragma Pictures; New Amsterdam Film Company; A Team Productions; Umedia; BNN-VARA; Vice Benelux; Habbekrats; uFund
- Distributed by: Gusto Entertainment; Artsploitation Films
- Release dates: 27 January 2018 (IFFR); 12 July 2018 (Netherlands); 26 September 2018
- Running time: 90 minutes
- Countries: Netherlands; Belgium
- Languages: Dutch; Flemish

We (Dutch: Wij) is a 2018 drama film written, directed and co-produced by Rene Eller. The movie was released on January 27, 2018, at the International Film Festival Rotterdam.

== Plot ==
A group of eight youthful friends (four male and four female) decide to find new ways to entertain themselves during the summertime while not in school. They allow their sexual curiosity to run freely and engage in several explicit sexual games involving explicit sex with each other and in groups. As the group experiments with their newly discovered freedom and in the absence of parental control or norms, some of their sexually oriented exploits become both irresponsible and dangerous to the people they encounter. Four of the youths recount what happened during their trial after they have been apprehended for the death of an innocent person who was unknowingly the victim of one of their sexual pranks.

== Cast ==
- Aimé Claeys as Thomas
- Tijmen Govaerts as Simon
- Pauline Casteleyn as Liesl
- Maxime Jacobs as Ruth
- Friso van der Werf as Jens
- Folkert Verdoorn as Karl
- Laura Drosopoulos as Ena
- Salomé van Grunsven as Femke
- Lieselot Siddiki as Loesje
- Gaia Sofia Cozijn as Sarah

== Soundtrack ==
- Tiptoe Falls: "Hush"
- Colin Stetson: "The Stars in His Head (Dark Lights Remix)"
- Colin Stetson: "In Love and in Justice"
- Colin Stetson: "From No Part of Me"
- Colin Stetson: "Won't Be a Thing to Become"
- Colin Stetson: "And Still They Move"
- Colin Stetson: "As a Bird or Branch"
- Colin Stetson: "Lord I Just Can't Keep From Crying"
- Blind Willie Johnson: "Lord I Just Can't Keep From Crying"
- David Hamilton: "Schubert - Arpeggione Sonata (1st Movement)"
- Jackson Tennessee Fourgeaud: "ARP #1"
- Colin Stetson: "Red Horse Judges II"

== Release ==
=== Reception ===
Patricia Smagge from the "Cinemagazine" wrote: "This film can be seen as a fascinating but jet-black portrait of a generation, or as a disturbing account in which it would have been better to devote more attention to the elaboration of the story and the characters than to bringing moral decay into the picture as explicitly as possible. You will have an opinion about 'We' anyway because it is a film that leaves its mark. David Pountain writing for FilmDoo stated: "Rene Eller’s bold and sinister portrayal of hedonistic youth is an alarming statement of collective identity, putting a generation’s worst impulses on display while suggesting that the larger ‘we’ of modern society is no less inclined to destruction and debauchery." Alex McLevy of The A.V. Club decried its nihilistic tone, conceding that "It’s a fairly well-directed and well-acted endeavor, which only adds to the disgust at what a waste it was having talented folks spend so much time on what’s essentially I Dare You to Care About This: The Movie", with pointless violence and cruelty, summing it up as "awful".

=== Accolades ===
We won the Golden Calf (award) of "Best Editing" (for Wouter van Luijn) at the 2018 Nederlands Film Festival., the "Best Director" (for Rene Eller) at the 2018 Raindance Film Festival and the "RIFF Jury Award" of "Best Film" at the Rome Independent Film Festival.

We was nominated for the "German Independence Award" of "Best Film" at the Oldenburg International Film Festival, the "KNF Award" at the International Film Festival Rotterdam and the "Best European First Film" at the Zlín Film Festival.
