= Blue Caprice =

- Theatrical release poster
- Directed by: Alexandre Moors
- Screenplay by: R.F.I. Porto
- Story by: Alexandre Moors; R.F.I. Porto
- Produced by: Isen Robbins; Aimee Schoof; Ron Simons; Stephen Tedeschi; Brian O'Connell; Kim Jackson; Will Rowbotham
- Starring: Isaiah Washington; Tequan Richmond; Joey Lauren Adams; Tim Blake Nelson; Leo Fitzpatrick; Cassandra Freeman
- Cinematography: Brian O'Carroll
- Edited by: Gordon Grinberg; Alexandre Moors
- Music by: Colin Stetson; Sarah Neufeld
- Production companies: SimonSays Entertainment; Stephen Tedeschi Production; Aiko Films; Intrinsic Value Films
- Distributed by: Sundance Selects
- Release dates: January 19, 2013 (Sundance); September 13, 2013 (United States)
- Running time: 93 minutes
- Country: United States
- Language: English
- Box office: $93,995

Blue Caprice is a 2013 American independent crime film directed by Alexandre Moors, and based on the 2002 D.C. sniper attacks. The film stars Isaiah Washington and Tequan Richmond as the perpetrators of the attacks, John Allen Muhammad and Lee Malvo, respectively, although the two are only referred to by their first names. It recounts how Lee, a lone teenager, was drawn into the shadow of John, who served as a father figure to him, and how they eventually began their killing spree.

Blue Caprice also stars Joey Lauren Adams, Tim Blake Nelson and Leo Fitzpatrick. It was written by R.F.I. Porto. It debuted at the 2013 Sundance Film Festival. The film was released in theaters on September 13, 2013.

== Plot ==
In 2002, Lee moves to the United States from Antigua and Barbuda by himself; his mother cannot come with him due to her job. As a lone teenager, Lee comes in contact with John. John is living with his three children: one daughter and two sons. After spending some time together, John and Lee move to Tacoma, Washington, alongside John's girlfriend Angela. John starts introducing Lee to others as his son.

John meets his old-time friend from his military service, Ray, while going for a jog with Lee. Ray introduces Lee to firearms and Lee turns out to be a skilled marksman. One day, John tries to contact his children in Maryland but is unsuccessful due to a restraining order. Frustrated by this, John comes home and has an argument with Angela over a petty issue; Angela throws John and Lee out of her house. John and Lee move in with Ray, his wife, and their toddler son. Lee discovers a cache of firearms in Ray's basement.

Gradually, John brainwashes an impressionable Lee into committing murders. Lee commits his first murder by shooting a woman point-blank in the head at her house. John encourages Lee to commit more murders in order to pay back the favor of bringing Lee to the United States. Lee commits his next murder by shooting a pub owner in the back and robbing him. With the robbery money, John and Lee buy a dark blue Chevrolet Caprice. John teaches Lee how to drive and modifies the car's rear, by cutting out a small makeshift gun port underneath the trunk.

John and Lee then conduct a siege of terror on the Washington, D.C. metropolitan area. Using a rifle fired from the Caprice's gun port, they commit a series of random shootings in public places for two weeks, plunging the public into fear and hysteria. The police start investigating the attacks. One night, the two park in a no-parking spot at a rest stop to sleep. A state trooper investigates their car for parking illegally and discovers it is the sniper's car and they are arrested.

Five months later, Lee is in a Virginian prison. He is visited by a juvenile case worker who tries to question him about the motives of the random killings. Lee remains stubborn and asks, "Where is my father?" as correctional officers escort him back to his cell.

== Cast ==
- Isaiah Washington as John
- Tequan Richmond as Lee
- Joey Lauren Adams as Jamie
- Tim Blake Nelson as Ray
- Leo Fitzpatrick as Arms Dealer
- Cassandra Freeman as Angela
- Abner Expósito-Seary as John's son

== Distribution and release ==
After premiering at Sundance, IFC's Sundance Selects acquired domestic distribution rights.

== Reception ==
=== Critical response ===
Blue Caprice received generally positive reviews from critics. The film has a score of 83% on Rotten Tomatoes based on 84 reviews, with an average score of 7.3 out of 10. The critical consensus states "Smart, sobering, and quietly chilling, Blue Caprice uses its horrible true-life story – and some solid performances – to underscore the dreadful banality of evil." The film also has a score of 76 out of 100 on Metacritic based on 25 critics.

=== Box office ===
The film was given a limited release in North America in 36 theaters and grossed $93,995 in its entire run.

== Graphic novel ==
In October 2013, it was announced that publisher Red Giant Entertainment would produce Public Enemies, a graphic novel based on the film, to be written by the film's screenwriter, R.F.I. Porto. The comic was never released.

== See also ==
- D.C. Sniper: 23 Days of Fear
- List of hood films
