= La Petite Nicole =

Studio album by Torngat
- Released: 2009
- Genre: Instrumental, post-rock
- Producer: Torngat

Torngat chronology
You Could Be (2007)	La Petite Nicole (2009)

La Petite Nicole is the fifth release of the Montreal-based instrumental act Torngat.

== Track listing ==
1. "Interlude" - 1:17
2. "La Petite Nicole" - 7:13
3. "L'école Pénitencier" - 4:24
4. "Afternoon Moon Pie" - 5:40
5. "6:23 pm" - 5:48
6. "Turtle Eyes & Fierce Rabbit" - 6:00
7. "Going What's What" - 7:36
