= You Could Be =

Studio album by Torngat
- Released: 2007
- Genres: Instrumental, post-rock
- Producer: Torngat

Torngat chronology
La Rouge (2005)	You Could Be (2007)	La Petite Nicole (2009)

You Could Be is the fourth release of the Montreal-based instrumental act Torngat.

== Track listing ==
1. "You Could Be" - 4:20
2. "Bordeaux Boredom" - 2:51
3. "Minute by Minute" - 5:58
4. "Many Faces, Many Places" - 1:58
5. "Mouton Noir" - 3:47
6. "Gemini One" - 2:01
7. "Suite A) Steps to a Lively Dance" - 4:01
8. "Suite B) Chorale" - 1:07
9. "Suite C) L'Ocean, La Nuit" - 3:46
10. "A Super Hero Anthem" - 4:20
11. "Celebrating New" - 4:49
12. "Hammond Song: Being a Torngat" - 1:54
