= Bell Orchestre =

Canadian instrumental band

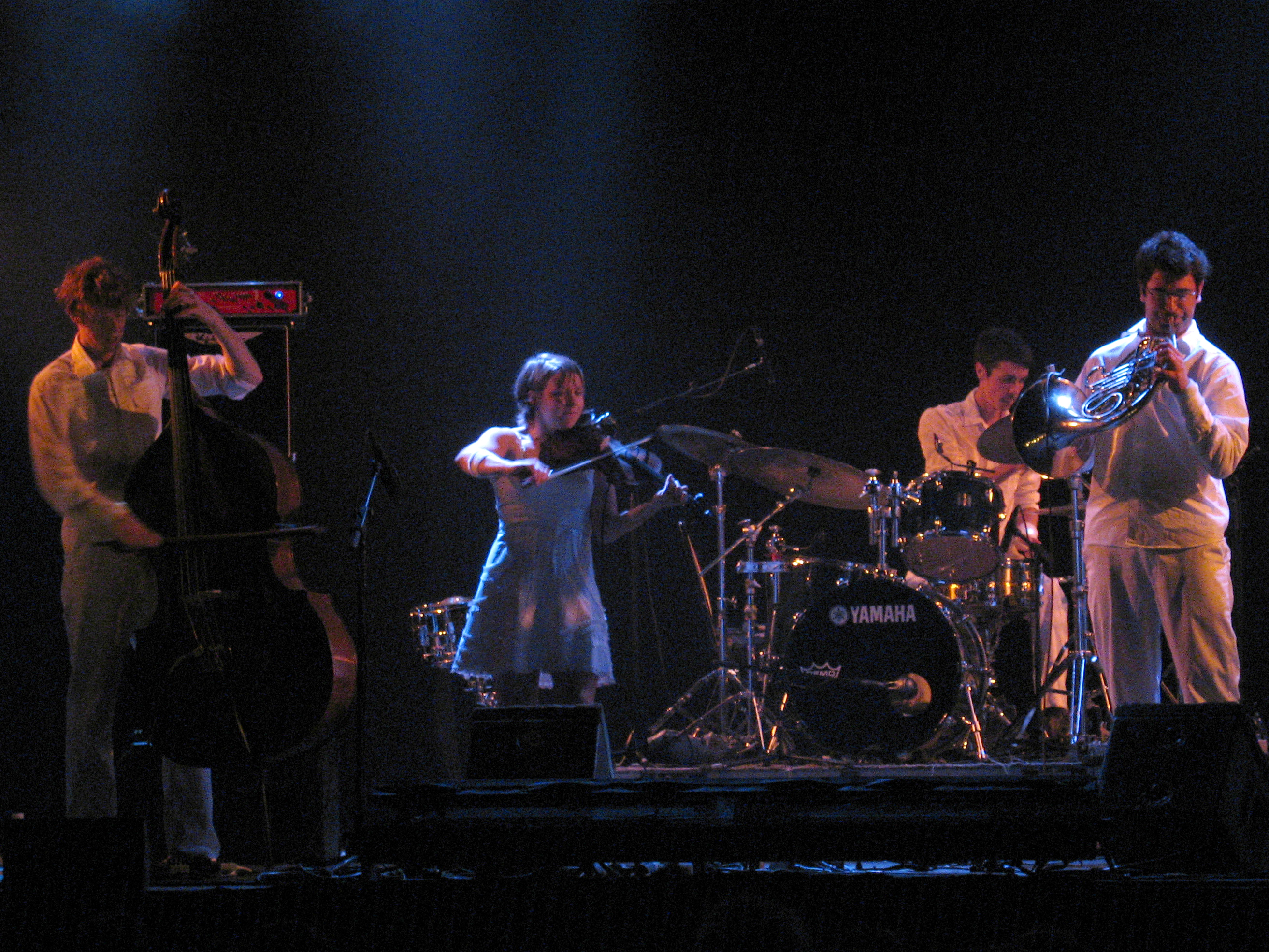
- Bell Orchestre perform in Montreal in July 2006.

Background information
- Origin: Montreal, Quebec, Canada
- Genre: Avant-garde
- Years active: 1999-present
- Labels: Erased Tapes, Arts & Crafts Productions, Rough Trade Records
- Members: Richard Parry; Sarah Neufeld; Pietro Amato; Kaveh Nabatian; Stefan Schneider; Mike Feuerstack
- Website: bellorchestre.com

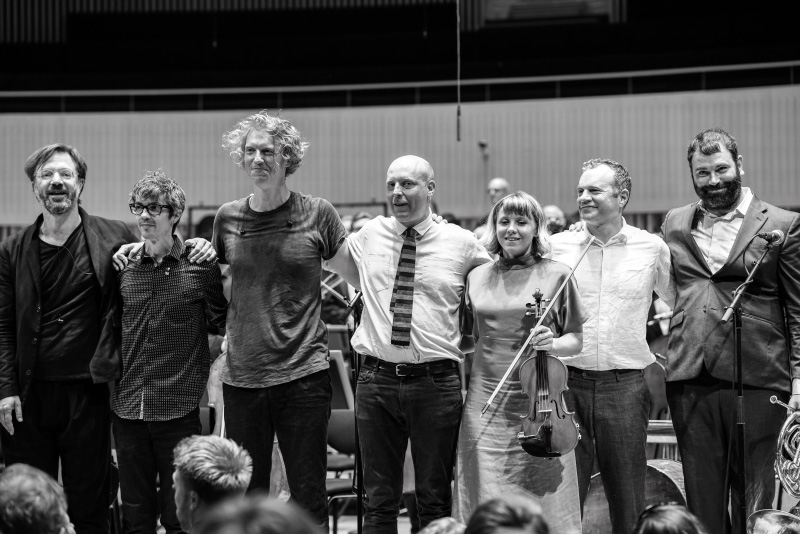
Bell Orchestre after a concert with Aarhus Symphony Orchestra in Aarhus (Denmark 2019.) Conductor André de Ridder far left.

Bell Orchestre is a six-piece instrumental band from Montreal. It was formed in 1999 by multi-instrumentalist Richard Parry and violinist Sarah Neufeld. Both also joined Arcade Fire. They were joined in Bell Orchestre by Michael Feuerstack (steel guitar), Stefan Schneider (drums/percussion), Pietro Amato (French horn/electronics), and Kaveh Nabatian (trumpet/melodica). Parry remains with Arcade Fire as well as Bell Orchestre; Neufeld left Arcade Fire. Amato is a member of the Luyas and Torngat, and a part-time member of Arcade Fire. Schneider is also a member of the Luyas. Nabatian is a member of Little Scream, as well as a film director whose films have included Vapor, The Seven Last Words and Without Havana.

The band released the demo Bell Orchestre in 2002 then, in late 2003, they recorded their first album, at the same time and in the same studio where Arcade Fire recorded Funeral. Arcade Fire's popularity quickly grew, they went on tour, and the Bell Orchestre album release was put on hold. Recording a Tape the Colour of the Light was released in 2006. The band toured Europe and the US to promote the album. At the Juno Awards of 2007, the album was nominated for Instrumental Album of the Year.

Bell Orchestre released its second album, As Seen Through Windows on March 10, 2009. It was recorded in Soma Electric Studios in Chicago. At the Juno Awards of 2010, the album won the award for Instrumental Album of the Year.

On October 20, 2020 the band released a new single "IX: Nature That's It That's All." along with its music video. On the same day they announced that they had signed to the British indie record label Erased Tapes. In 2021, they released the album House Music.

== Discography ==
- Bell Orchestre (2002, demo), Independent
- Recording a Tape the Colour of the Light (2005), Rough Trade Records
- Who Designs Nature's How (2009, EP), Arts & Crafts Productions
- As Seen Through Windows (2009), Arts & Crafts Productions
- House Music (2021), Erased Tapes Records
