= Richard Reed Parry =

Canadian musician

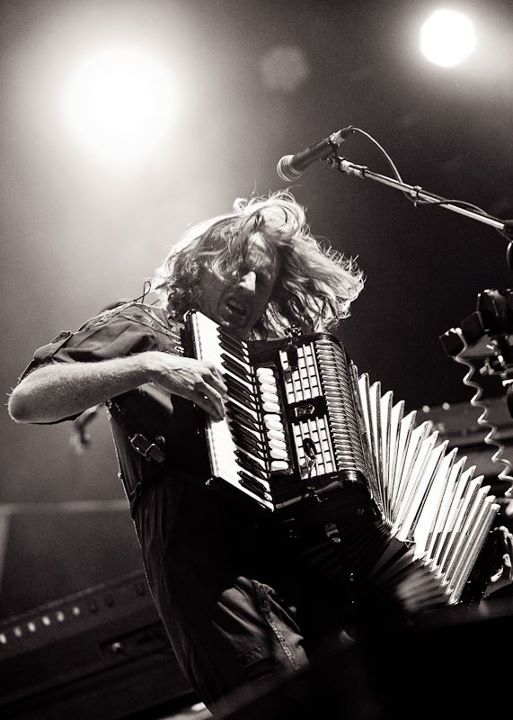
- Parry performing with Arcade Fire in 2011

Background information
- Also known as: Richy
- Born: Richard Reed Parry; October 4, 1977 (age 48)
- Origin: Ottawa, Ontario, Canada
- Genres: Indie rock; post-rock; chamber music
- Occupations: Musician; composer
- Instruments: Double bass; keyboards; guitar; bass guitar; accordion; drums; percussion; vocals
- Years active: 2000–present

Richard Reed Parry (born October 4, 1977) is a Canadian multi-instrumentalist, composer, producer, best known as a core member of the indie rock band Arcade Fire, where he plays a wide variety of instruments, often switching between guitar, double bass, drums, celesta, keyboards, and accordion.

== Early life and education ==
Parry comes from a musical family. His late father was David Parry of the folk band Friends of Fiddler's Green. His mother, Caroline Balderston Parry, was a poet and musician, and his sister, Evalyn Parry, is a theatre artist, songwriter, and spoken word performer. Parry's family is Quaker and Parry grew up attending Toronto Monthly Meeting.

Parry attended Canterbury High School in Ottawa, Ontario, Canada and was one of a dozen members of the Literary Arts program (first generation). His classmates include Stargate: Atlantis writer Martin Gero and The Holmes Show comedian Kurt Smeaton.

In the mid 1990s, he worked summers at a vegetarian camp in near Chelsea, Quebec, called Camp Au Grand Bois.

In the late 1990s and early 2000s, he studied electroacoustics and contemporary dance at Concordia University in Montreal.

== Career ==
The Bell Orchestre was formed in 2005, along with Sarah Neufeld, Tim Kingsbury as well as Stefan Schneider and French horn player Pietro Amato. Parry primarily plays double bass and is the de facto producer. Bell Orchestre released As Seen Through Windows with Arts & Crafts Records on March 10, 2009. It was recorded with John Mcentire in Soma Electric Studios in Chicago, Illinois. The album won a 2011 Juno Award for best instrumental album.

A long-time core member of Arcade Fire, he co-produced and collaborated on the debut EP, Arcade Fire, before the first lineup of the band fell apart. Helping to reform and recreate the band, Parry brought in Bell Orchestre bandmate Sarah Neufeld, and New International Standards bandmates, Tim Kingsbury and Jeremy Gara.

He has also made musical contributions to albums by The National, Little Scream, Sufjan Stevens, The Unicorns and Islands. On the latter's critically acclaimed 2006 album Return to the Sea, he played several instruments, sang background vocals and arranged strings, and appeared with the band's 2016 10-year-anniversary shows where they played the album in full. Parry has also performed in a cover band called Phi Slamma Jamma along with Arcade Fire bandmates Will Butler, Jeremy Gara, and Tim Kingsbury. The group performed at the 2011 POP Montreal Festival as well as the 2012 Crossing Brooklyn Ferry Festival.

On January 20, 2007, Parry returned to Canterbury High to perform a concert with Arcade Fire in the school's cafeteria. Only 400 students and staff were permitted to attend the show. Beforehand, those chosen had the opportunity to preview new, unreleased songs from the Arcade Fire's upcoming album. After the show, there was a brief autograph period and the students met with the band members.

He was also formerly a member of the band the New International Standards, with Tim Kingsbury and Jeremy Gara. His first work for Orchestra, entitled For Heart, Breath and Orchestra. It was recorded by the Kitchener-Waterloo Symphony, on their 2011 album From Here on Out alongside pieces by Jonny Greenwood and Nico Muhly. He has also written commissioned works for Kronos Quartet, yMusic and Bryce Dessner, and his chamber works also have been performed by the Calder Quartet and Warhol Dervish. Parry appeared at each night of the 2012 All Tomorrow's Parties festival, mounting a "moving surround sound sci-fi composition for bicycles and boomboxes" entitled Drones/Revelations, as well as performing songs with a folk trio called Quiet River of Dust, and as part of a chamber music ensemble performing Parry's Music for Heart and Breath. The lineup included Owen Pallett, Nico Muhly, Bryce Dessner, Aaron Dessner, Gaspar Claus, Nadia Sirota, Kyle Resnick, and Dave Nelson. He occasionally performs as drummer and backup singer with Little Scream.

Parry has also collaborated with The National, arranging vocals and writing guitar parts for their songs on their 2010 album High Violet and appeared with them singing and playing guitar and double bass in their Vevo live event as well as on their Late Night with David Letterman appearance in 2011. He has joined them frequently onstage as a guest during many performances, including Lollapalooza 2010 (at which Arcade Fire also performed) and also during a brief segment of Arcade Fire's 2011 midwestern US tour in which The National acted as openers. Parry has also collaborated with Bryce Dessner of The National on classical compositions, performing together at the Edinburgh Festival in 2015.

Parry recently co-hosted a BBC 6 Music Takeover programme with the members of The National called Arcade Fire and the National Takeover. Parry and brothers Aaron and Bryce Dessner who play guitar in The National have been long-term friends since meeting on the American alt-rock circuit, regularly appearing on the same festival bills worldwide. Their friendship was cemented when Richard from the Arcade Fire contributed to a number of songs on The National's album High Violet, most notably playing double bass and guitar on "Vanderlyle Crybaby Geeks", and doing the vocal harmony arrangements on "Conversation 16" and "Sorrow". During this show Parry mentioned he was producing an album by a local Montreal artist named Little Scream.

In July 2018 Parry announced the upcoming release of two albums: Quiet River Of Dust Vol. 1 and Quiet River Of Dust Vol. 2. The albums are inspired by Buddhist myths, death poems, British folk songs, and a recent trip to Japan.

Between 2019 and 2021, Richard Reed Parry produced The Sadies' 2022 album Colder Streams at Montréal's Skybarn. This was the last album by The Sadies to feature founding member Dallas Good, who died suddenly of natural causes on February 17, 2022, at the age of 48. Shortly after, Parry announced via Instagram that he and Dallas had been working on an album on and off since 2008 with the working title The Watchtower. Unfinished at the time of Dallas Good's death, Parry plans to finish the album.

In 2023, Parry composed the score of the biographical drama film The Iron Claw by Sean Durkin, the score for Eileen by William Oldroyd, and the score for the hybrid documentary Adrianne and the Castle by Shannon Walsh.

In April 2025, Arcade Fire announced that Parry would miss their upcoming Pink Elephant tour; Parry had taken parental leave whilst he and his wife prepared for the birth of their first child.

== Personal life ==
Parry married Laurel Sprengelmeyer, better known as the musician Little Scream, in October 2019.

== Discography ==
=== Solo albums ===
- Music For Heart and Breath (2014) (with Kronos Quartet, yMusic, Bryce and Aaron Dessner, Nadia Sirota)
- Quiet River of Dust Vol.1: This Side of the River (2018)
- Quiet River of Dust Vol. 2: That Side of the River (2019)
- Heart and Breath: Rhythm and Tone Fields (2022) (with Susie Ibarra
- First Sounds (2024) (with Sarah Neufeld and Rebecca Foon)
- Were the Watchtowers (2026) (with Dallas Good

=== Film scores ===
- The Nest (2020)
- Eileen (2023)
- The Iron Claw (2023)
- Adrianne + The Castle (2024)
- The Actor (2025)

=== Arcade Fire ===
- Arcade Fire (EP, Merge, 2003)
- Funeral (LP, Merge, 2004)
- Neon Bible (LP, Merge, 2007)
- The Suburbs (LP, Merge, 2010)
- Reflektor (LP, Merge, 2013)
- Everything Now (LP, Sonovox, 2017)
- We (LP, Sonovox, 2022)
- Pink Elephant (LP, Columbia, 2025)

=== Bell Orchestre ===
- Bell Orchestre, (demo, 2002)
- Recording a Tape the Colour of the Light, (album, 2005)
- As Seen Through Windows, (LP, released on March 10, 2009)
- Who Designs Nature's How, (EP, released on August 25, 2009)
- House Music (2021)

== Appearances ==
=== Full track appearances ===
- Master Mix: Red Hot + Arthur Russell (2 tracks on compilation LP), (Yep Roc, 2012)
- From Here on Out, Kitchener-Waterloo Symphony, (LP, Analekta, 2012)
- Spirit of Talk Talk, (track on compilation LP, Fierce Panda, 2012)
- Have Not Been the Same, (track on compilation LP, Zunior, 2012)

=== Little Scream ===
- The Golden Record, (LP, Secretly Canadian, 2011)
- Cult Following, (LP, Merge, 2016)

=== The National ===
- Trouble Will Find Me, (LP, 4AD, 2013)
- High Violet, (LP, 4AD, 2010)

=== Barr Brothers ===
- Sleeping Operator, (LP, Secret City Records, 2014)

=== Islands ===
- Return to the Sea, (LP, Rough Trade, 2007)

=== The Unicorns ===
- Who Will Cut Our Hair When We're Gone?, (LP, Rough Trade, 2004)

=== Leonard Cohen ===
- Thanks for the Dance, (LP, Columbia, 2019)

=== Neko Case ===
- Neon Grey Midnight Green, (LP, ANTI, 2025)
