= Torngat (album) =

Studio album by Torngat
- Released: June 2003
- Recorded: 2002 at Entrelac
- Genre: Instrumental
- Producer: Torngat and Érick Jarry

Torngat chronology
Torngat (2003)	Live at The Bread Factory (2004)

Torngat is the first album of the Montreal-based instrumental act Torngat.

== Track listing ==
1. "32 mm"
2. "Three Frozen Birds"
3. "Long stick"
4. "Lady Grey"
5. "Sadly Looking at an Immersed Dying Eider"
6. "Resurfacing"
7. "Space"
8. "Drop the Bomb"
9. "New Groove"
10. "Ukumama"
11. "Backpain"
12. "Sparks Like a Song"
13. "Hate to Say I Told You So"
14. "Angels Try"
