= Torngat (band) =

Canadian instrumental rock band

- Origin: Montréal, Québec, Canada
- Genres: Instrumental rock
- Years active: 2001–present
- Label: Alien8 Recordings
- Members: Pietro Amato; Mathieu Charbonneau; Julien Poissant

Torngat is a Canadian indie band and instrumental music trio based in Montreal, Quebec. The members are horn player Pietro Amato, keyboardist Mathieu Charbonneau, and percussionist Julien Poissant.

== History ==
Torngat was established in 2001. The band named themselves for the rugged Torngat Mountains to reflect the band's open and improvisational style of their music. The group released its first self-titled album the next year. They developed a stage show in which they frequently exchange instruments during performances.

In 2005, Torngat released an EP, La Rouge. During the spring of 2006, Torngat toured Eastern Canada. Torngat signed a two-album deal with Montreal experimental label Alien8 Recordings. The band recorded a full-length album You Could Be, which was released in September 2007, and received positive reviews. That year the band performed at the Hillside Festival in Guelph.

== Band members ==
- Pietro Amato - french horn (and electronics, percussion, melodeon)
- Mathieu Charbonneau - Wurlitzer (and Analog Synth, Hammond, percussion, melodeon).
- Julien Poissant - percussion (and Wurlitzer, trumpet, melodeon)

== Discography ==
- Torngat (2002)
- Live at The Bread Factory (2004)
- La Rouge (2005)
- You Could Be (2007)
- La Petite Nicole (2009)
