= As Seen Through Windows =

Studio album by Bell Orchestre
- Released: March 10, 2009
- Genre: Instrumental rock
- Length: 52:47
- Labels: Arts & Crafts A&C041

Bell Orchestre chronology
Recording a Tape the Colour of the Light (2005)	As Seen Through Windows (2009)

Professional ratings
Review scores
Source	Rating
AllMusic	4/5 stars
Pitchfork Media	(7.5/10)

As Seen Through Windows is the second album by Canadian band Bell Orchestre. It was recorded at Soma Electric Studios in Chicago, IL.

== Track listing ==
1. "Stripes" — 2:18
2. "Elephants" — 8:53
3. "Icicles/Bicycles" — 6:15
4. "Water/Light/Shifts" — 3:09
5. "Bucephalus Bouncing Ball" — 4:56
6. "As Seen Through Windows" — 8:11
7. "The Gaze" — 2:38
8. "Dark Lights" — 5:28
9. "Air Lines/Land Lines" — 11:50
