= Recording a Tape the Colour of the Light =

Studio album by Bell Orchestre
- Released: August 22, 2005 (UK); November 8, 2005 (North America)
- Recorded: Fall 2003–winter 2005 at the Hotel2Tango
- Genre: Instrumental rock
- Length: 52:47
- Label: Rough Trade RTRAD257

Bell Orchestre chronology
Bell Orchestre (2002)	Recording a Tape the Colour of the Light (2005)	As Seen Through Windows (2009)

Professional ratings
Review scores
Source	Rating
AllMusic	3.5/5 stars
Pitchfork Media	(7.8/10)

Recording a Tape the Colour of the Light is the debut release of Montreal-based instrumental act Bell Orchestre. On the back of the album, the track listing includes a track set off from the rest called (frost). On the iTunes Music Store, the last three minutes and fifty seconds of "Recording A Tunnel (The Invisible Bells)" are sold under the name "Frost" and "Recording A Tunnel (The Invisible Bells)" is shortened to 6:32 playing time.

== Track listing ==
1. "Recording a Tunnel (The Horns Play Underneath the Canal)" – 0:42
2. "Les Lumières Pt. 1" – 6:17
3. "Les Lumières Pt. 2" –3:50
4. "Throw It on a Fire" – 4:46
5. "Recording a Tunnel" – 1:53
6. "The Upwards March" – 4:21
7. "The Bells Play the Band" – 1:19
8. "Recording a Tape... (Typewriter Duet)" – 3:41
9. "Nuevo" – 5:51
10. "Salvatore Amato" – 6:39
11. "Recording a Tunnel (The Invisible Bells)" – 13:28
