= List of awards and nominations received by Arcade Fire =

Arcade Fire awards and nominations
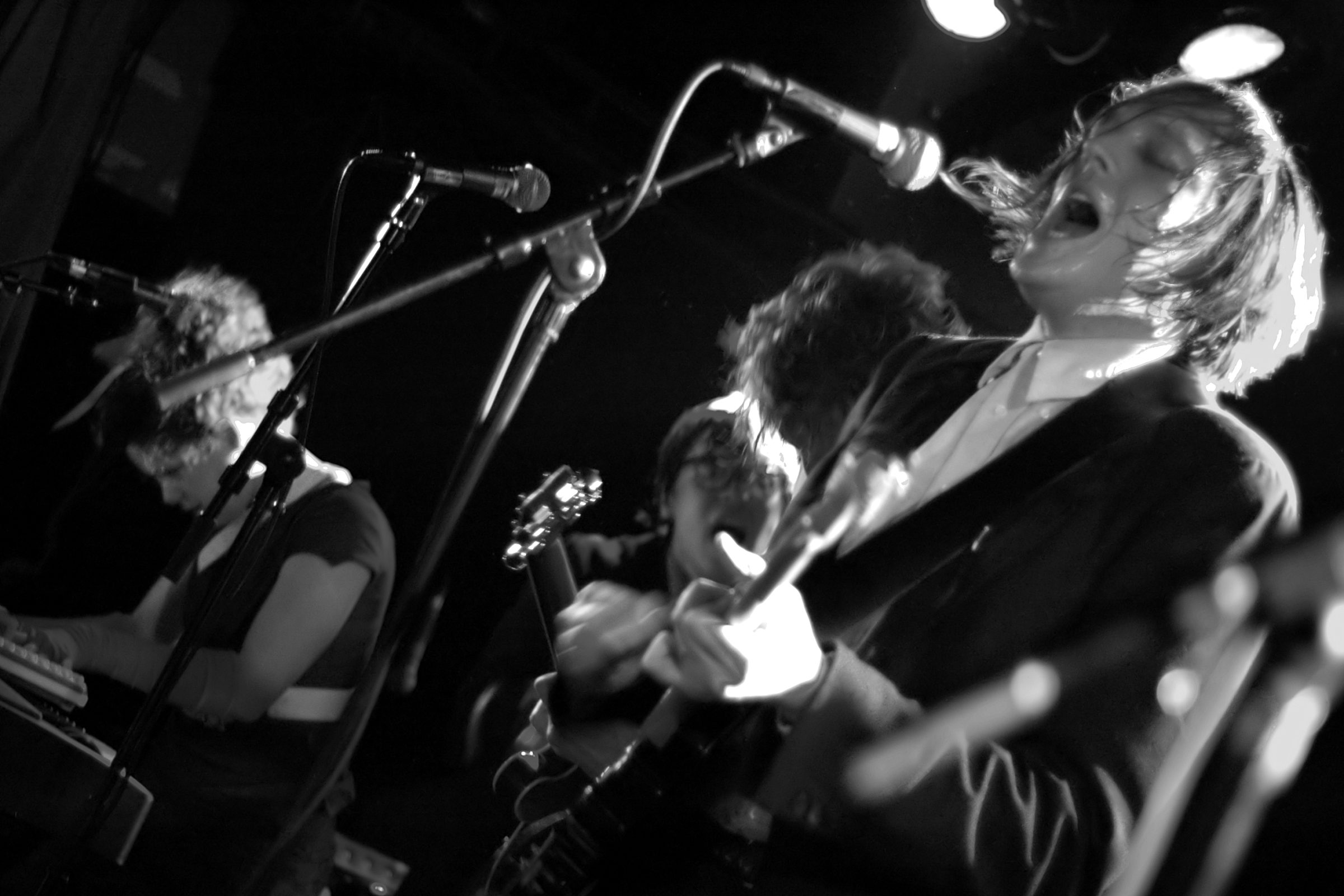
- Arcade Fire performing live on March 15, 2005 at Debaser, Stockholm, Sweden
Awards and nominations
Award	Wins	Nominations
Brit	2	8
Grammy	1	10
Juno	10	18
Meteor Music	1	5
NME	3	15
PLUG	5	10
Polaris	2	5

Totals (Note: Certain award groups do not simply award one winner. They acknowledge several different recipients, have runners-up, and have third place. Since this is a specific recognition and is different from losing an award, runner-up mentions are considered wins in this award tally. For simplification and to avoid errors, each award in this list has been presumed to have had a prior nomination.)
- Wins: 26
- Nominations: 72

Arcade Fire is a Canadian indie rock band from Montreal, Quebec. The band was formed by the husband and wife duo of Win Butler and Régine Chassagne in 2003, and released its first studio album Funeral on Merge Records in September 2004. The album produced five singles: "Neighborhood #1 (Tunnels)" (2004), "Neighborhood #2 (Laïka)" (2005), "Neighborhood #3 (Power Out)" (2005), "Rebellion (Lies)" (2005), and "Wake Up" (2005). Funeral earned the band a nomination at the 48th Annual Grammy Awards. The album has sold over 320,000 copies in the United States and over 100,000 copies in Canada. Funeral peaked at number 23 in Canada and number 131 in the United States.

The band's second album, Neon Bible, was released on March 5, 2007, to favourable reviews. The album produced four singles: "Black Mirror" (2007), "Keep the Car Running" (2007), "Intervention" (2007), and "No Cars Go" (2007). Neon Bible was nominated at the 2008 Grammy Award for Best Alternative Music Album, and it won the Juno Award for Alternative Album of the Year. The album also sold 142,000 copies as of May 2008, peaking at number one in Canada and number two in the United States. Arcade Fire has received five awards from 21 nominations, including two Juno Awards from six nominations, one Meteor Music Awards from three nominations, and two PLUG Independent Music Awards from three nominations.

== Antville Music Video Awards ==
The Antville Music Video Awards are online awards for the best music video and music video directors of the year. They were first awarded in 2005. Arcade Fire has received seven nominations.

Year	Nominee / work	Award	Result
2005	"Neighborhood #3 (Power Out)"	Worst Video	Nominated
2005	"Neighborhood #3 (Power Out)"	Best Video	Nominated
2007	"My Body Is a Cage"	Best Editing	Nominated
2013	"Afterlife"	Best Performance	Nominated
2013	"Afterlife"	Best Choreography	Nominated
2013	"Reflektor"	Best Interactive Video	Nominated
2013	Arcade Fire	Best Commissioning Artist	Nominated

== Brit Awards ==
The Brit Awards are the British Phonographic Industry's annual pop music awards. Arcade Fire has received eight nominations and two won.

Year	Nominee / work	Award	Result
2006	Funeral	International Album	Nominated
2006	Arcade Fire	International Breakthrough Act	Nominated
2006	Arcade Fire	International Group	Nominated
2008	Neon Bible	International Album	Nominated
2008	Arcade Fire	International Group	Nominated
2011	The Suburbs	International Album	Won
2011	Arcade Fire	International Group	Won
2014	Arcade Fire	International Group	Nominated
2018	Arcade Fire	International Group	Nominated

== CASBY Awards ==
The CASBY Awards are a Canadian awards ceremony for independent and alternative music, presented annually by Toronto, Ontario radio station CFNY-FM, currently branded as 102.1 The Edge. CASBY is an acronym for Canadian Artists Selected By You.

Year	Nominee / work	Award	Result
2005	Funeral	Favorite New Album	Won
2005	Arcade Fire	Favorite New Artist	Won

== GAFFA Awards ==
=== Denmark GAFFA Awards ===
Delivered since 1991, the GAFFA Awards are a Danish award that rewards popular music by the magazine of the same name.

Year	Nominee / work	Award	Result	Ref.
2007	Neon Bible	Best Foreign Album	Won	
2007	Arcada Fire	Best Foreign Band	Won	

=== Sweden GAFFA Awards ===
Delivered since 2010, the GAFFA Awards (Swedish: GAFFA Priset) are a Swedish award that rewards popular music awarded by the magazine of the same name.

Year	Nominee / work	Award	Result	Ref.
2018	"Everything Now"	Best Foreign Song	Nominated	

== Grammy Awards ==
The Grammy Awards are awarded annually by The Recording Academy of the United States. Arcade Fire has received ten nominations and has won once.

Year	Nominee / work	Award	Result
2006	"Cold Wind" (from Six Feet Under)	Best Song Written for Visual Media	Nominated
2006	Funeral	Best Alternative Music Album	Nominated
2008	Neon Bible	Best Alternative Music Album	Nominated
2011	"Ready to Start"	Best Rock Performance by a Duo or Group with Vocal	Nominated
2011	The Suburbs	Album of the Year	Won
2011	The Suburbs	Best Alternative Music Album	Nominated
2013	"Abraham's Daughter" (from The Hunger Games)	Best Song Written for Visual Media	Nominated
2015	"We Exist"	Best Music Video (Director: David Wilson)	Nominated
2015	Reflektor	Best Alternative Music Album	Nominated
2018	Everything Now	Best Alternative Music Album	Nominated
2023	We	Best Alternative Music Album	Nominated

== iHeartRadio Much Music Video Awards ==
The iHeartRadio Much Music Video Awards are annual awards presented by the Canadian television channel Much to honour the year's best music video. Arcade Fire has won one award from twelve nominations.

Year	Nominee / work	Award	Result
2005	"Rebellion (Lies)"	Best Independent Video	Nominated
2006	"Neighborhood #3 (Power Out)"	Best Post-Production	Nominated
2011	"The Suburbs"	International Video of the Year by a Canadian	Nominated
2011	"The Suburbs"	UR Fave: Artist	Nominated
2012	"Sprawl II (Mountains Beyond Mountains)"	MuchFACT Indie Video of the Year	Nominated
2014	"Afterlife"	Video of the Year	Nominated
2014	"Afterlife"	Director of the Year (Director: Emily Kai Bock)	Nominated
2014	"Reflektor"	Rock/Alternative Video of the Year	Nominated
2014	"Reflektor"	Your Fave Video	Nominated
2015	"We Exist"	Video of the Year	Nominated
2015	"We Exist"	Best Director (Director: David Wilson)	Nominated
2015	"We Exist"	Best Rock/Alternative Video	Won
2018	Arcade Fire	Best Rock/Alternative Artist or Group	Nominated

== Juno Awards ==
The Juno Awards are presented by the Canadian Academy of Recording Arts and Sciences. Arcade Fire has won ten awards from eighteen nominations.

Year	Nominee / work	Award	Result
2005	Funeral	Alternative Album of the Year	Nominated
2005	Funeral	Best Album Design	Nominated
2006	"Neighborhood #3 (Power Out)"	Video of the Year	Nominated
2006	Arcade Fire	Songwriter of the Year	Won
2008	Neon Bible	Video of the Year	Nominated
2008	Neon Bible	Alternative Album of the Year	Won
2008	Neon Bible	CD/DVD Artwork Design of the Year	Won
2008	Arcade Fire	Group of the Year	Nominated
2011	The Suburbs	Album of the Year	Won
2011	The Suburbs	Alternative Album of the Year	Won
2011	Arcade Fire	Group of the Year	Won
2011	Arcade Fire	Songwriter of the Year	Won
2011	Arcade Fire	Jack Richardson Producer of the Year	Nominated
2014	Reflektor	Album of the Year	Won
2014	Reflektor	Alternative Album of the Year	Won
2014	"Reflektor"	Single of the Year	Nominated
2014	Arcade Fire	Group of the Year	Nominated
2014	Arcade Fire	Songwriter of the Year	Nominated
2014	Arcade Fire	Fan Choice Award	Nominated
2016	Arcade Fire	Allan Waters Humanitarian Award	Won
2018	Everything Now	Album of the Year	Won
2018	Everything Now	Alternative Album of the Year	Nominated
2018	Everything Now	Album Artwork of the Year	Nominated
2018	"Everything Now"	Single of the Year	Nominated
2018	Arcade Fire	Group of the Year	Nominated
2023	Arcade Fire	Group of the Year	Nominated
2026	Arcade Fire	Group of the Year	Nominated

== Meteor Music Awards ==
The Meteor Music Awards are distributed by MCD Productions. Arcade Fire has won one award from five nominations.

Year	Nominee / work	Award	Result
2006	Funeral	Best International Album	Nominated
2006	Arcade Fire	Best International Band	Nominated
2008	Neon Bible	Best International Album	Won
2008	Arcade Fire	Best International Band	Nominated
2008	Arcade Fire	Best International Live Performance	Nominated

== Mojo Awards ==
The Mojo Awards was an awards ceremony that began in 2004 and ended in 2010 by Mojo, a popular music magazine published monthly by Bauer Media Group in the United Kingdom. Arcade Fire has won one award from two nominations.

Year	Nominee / work	Award	Result
2005	Arcade Fire	Best New Act	Nominated
2007	Arcade Fire	Best Live Act	Won

== MTV Europe Music Awards ==
The MTV Europe Music Awards is an event presented by Viacom International Media Networks Europe which awards prizes to musicians and performers. Arcade Fire nominated seven awards.

Year	Nominee / work	Award	Result
2010	Arcade Fire	Best Alternative	Nominated
2011	Arcade Fire	Best Alternative	Nominated
2011	Arcade Fire	Best World Stage Performance	Nominated
2012	Arcade Fire	Best World Stage Performance	Nominated
2014	"We Exist"	Best Song with a Social Message	Nominated
2014	Arcade Fire	Best Canadian Act	Nominated
2018	Arcade Fire	Best Canadian Act	Nominated

== MTV Video Music Awards ==
The MTV Video Music Awards is an award presented by the cable channel MTV to honor the best in the music video medium. Arcade Fire has won one award from two nominations.

Year	Nominee / work	Award	Result
2014	"Reflektor"	Best Art Direction (Art Director: Anastasia Masaro)	Won
2014	"Afterlife"	Best Cinematography (Cinematographer: Darren Lew and Jackson Hunt)	Nominated

== MTV Woodie Awards ==
The MTV Woodie Awards was a defunct music show presented by MTVU with awards voted on by fans.

Year	Nominee / work	Award	Result
2005	"Neighborhood #3 (Power Out)"	Best Video Woodie - Animated	Nominated
2005	Arcade Fire	Woodie of the Year	Nominated
2005	Arcade Fire	Left Field Woodie	Nominated
2005	Arcade Fire	International Woodie	Nominated
2011	"The Suburbs"	Woodie of the Year	Nominated
2014	"Afterlife"	Best Video Woodie	Nominated
2014	Arcade Fire	Performing Woodie	Nominated
2014	Arcade Fire	Did It My Way Woodie	Nominated

== NME Awards ==
The NME Awards are an annual music awards show, founded by the music magazine NME. Arcade Fire has been nominated 15 times, and won 3 awards.

Year	Nominee / work	Award	Result
2006	Arcade Fire	Best International Band	Nominated
2008	Arcade Fire	Best International Band	Nominated
2008 (US)	Neon Bible	Best International Alternative/Indie Album	Nominated
2008 (US)	"Intervention"	Best International Alternative/Indie Track	Nominated
2008 (US)	Arcade Fire	Best International Alternative/Indie Band	Won
2008 (US)	Arcade Fire	Best International Alternative/Indie Live Act	Won
2011	The Suburbs	Best Album	Won
2011	"We Used to Wait"	Best Music Video	Nominated
2011	Arcade Fire	Best International Band	Nominated
2011	Arcade Fire	Best Live Band	Nominated
2012	Arcade Fire	Best International Band	Nominated
2014	"Reflektor"	Best Music Video	Nominated
2014	"Reflektor"	Best Track	Nominated
2014	Arcade Fire	Best International Band	Nominated
2015	Arcade Fire	Best International Band	Nominated

== PLUG Independent Music Awards ==
The PLUG Independent Music Awards are given in support of independent musician. Arcade Fire has won five awards from ten nominations.

Year	Nominee / work	Award	Result
2005	Funeral	Indie Rock Album of the Year	Nominated
2005	Funeral	Album Art/Packaging of the Year	Won
2005	Arcade Fire	New Artist of the Year	Won
2006	Arcade Fire	Live Act of the Year	Won
2008	Neon Bible	Album of the Year	Won
2008	Neon Bible	Indie Rock Album of the Year	Nominated
2008	Neon Bible	Album Art/Packaging of the Year	Nominated
2008	"Keep the Car Running"	Song of the Year	Nominated
2008	Arcade Fire	Artist of the Year	Nominated
2008	Arcade Fire	Live Act of the Year	Won

== Polaris Music Prize ==
The Polaris Music Prize is awarded annually to the best full-length Canadian album based on artistic merit. Arcade Fire has won two award from five nominations.

Year	Nominee / work	Award	Result
2007	Neon Bible	Polaris Music Prize	Nominated
2011	The Suburbs	Polaris Music Prize	Won
2014	Reflektor	Polaris Music Prize	Shortlisted
2015	Funeral	Polaris Heritage Prize (2000~2005)	Nominated
2016	Funeral	Polaris Heritage Prize (1996~2005)	Won
2018	Everything Now	Polaris Music Prize	Longlisted
2022	We	Polaris Music Prize	Longlisted

== Prism Prize ==
The Prism Prize is a national juried award recognizing the artistry of the modern music video in Canada. Arcade Fire has won two awards from three nominations.

Year	Nominee / work	Award	Result
2013	"Sprawl II (Mountains Beyond Mountains)"	Audience Award (Director: Vincent Morisset)	Won
2014	"Afterlife"	Prism Prize (Director: Emily Kai Bock)	Won
2014	"Reflektor"	Prism Prize (Director: Anton Corbijn)	Nominated

== Q Awards ==
The Q Awards are the United Kingdom annual music awards run by the music magazine Q. Arcade Fire has been nominated for nine awards.

Year	Nominee / work	Award	Result
2007	Neon Bible	Best Album	Nominated
2007	Arcade Fire	Best Live Act	Nominated
2010	The Suburbs	Best Album	Nominated
2010	"We Used to Wait"	Best Video	Nominated
2010	Arcade Fire	Best Act in the World	Nominated
2011	Arcade Fire	Best Act in the World	Nominated
2011	Arcade Fire	Greatest Act of the Last 25 Years	Nominated
2014	Arcade Fire	Best Act in the World	Nominated
2014	Arcade Fire	Best Live Act	Nominated

== Shortlist Music Prize ==
The Shortlist Music Prize was an annual music award for the best album released in the United States that had sold fewer than 500,000 copies at the time of nomination. Arcade Fire was nominated for two awards.

Year	Nominee / work	Award	Result
2005	Funeral	Shortlist Music Prize	Nominated
2007	Neon Bible	Shortlist Music Prize	Nominated

== Silver Clef Award ==
The Silver Clef Award is an annual United Kingdom music awards lunch which has been running since 1976.

Year	Nominee / work	Award	Result
2011	Arcade Fire	Ambassadors of Rock Award	Won

== SOCAN Songwriting Prize ==
The SOCAN Songwriting Prize (Society of Composers, Authors and Music Publishers of Canada) is an annual competition recognizing the best in Canadian emerging music, both anglophone and francophone.

Year	Nominee / work	Award	Result
2011	"We Used to Wait"	Anglophone Songwriting Prize	Nominated

== UK Music Video Awards ==
The UK Music Video Awards is an annual celebration of creativity, technical excellence and innovation in music video and moving image for music.

Year	Nominee / work	Award	Result
2011	"The Suburbs"	Best Alternative Video - International	Won
2011	"We Used To Wait"	The Innovation Award	Nominated
2014	"After Life"	Best Alternative Video - International	Won
2017	"Everything Everything"	Best Visual Effects in a Video	Nominated
