= Primavera Sound 2017 =

Music festival in Barcelona, Spain

The Primavera Sound 2017 was held on 29 May to 4 June 2017 at the Parc del Fòrum, Barcelona, Spain.

The headliners were Arcade Fire, Bon Iver, the xx, Aphex Twin, Grace Jones, Slayer, Solange, and Van Morrison. American musician Frank Ocean was set to headline the festival but cancelled due to production delays.

== Lineup ==
Headline performers are listed in boldface. Artists listed from latest to earliest set times.

=== Heineken ===
Thursday, 1 June	Friday, 2 June	Saturday, 3 June
**Aphex Twin**; **Bon Iver**; Miguel; Kevin Morby	Jamie xx; **The xx**; The Growlers; Belako	Skepta; **Grace Jones**; **Van Morrison**; Songhoy Blues

Heineken headlining set lists
Bon Iver
1. "22 (OVER S∞∞N)"
2. "10 d E A T h b R E a s T"
3. "715 - CREEKS"
4. "33 “GOD”"
5. "29 #Strafford APTS"
6. "666 ʇ"
7. "Beach Baby"
8. "Brackett, WI"
9. "21 M♢♢N WATER"
10. "8 (circle)"
11. "____45_____"
12. "Perth"
13. "Minnesota, WI"
14. "Holocene"
15. "Calgary"
16. "Creature Fear"
17. "Skinny Love"
The xx
1. "Say Something Loving"
2. "Crystalised"
3. "Islands"
4. "I Dare You"
5. "Lips"
6. "Sunset"
7. "Replica"
8. "Performance"
9. "Infinity"
10. "VCR"
11. "Dangerous"
12. "Fiction"
13. "Shelter"
14. "Loud Places"
15. "On Hold"
16. "Intro"
17. "Angels"
Grace Jones
1. "Nightclubbing"
2. "This Is"
3. "Private Life"
4. "I've Seen That Face Before (Libertango)"
5. "My Jamaican Guy"
6. "Shenanigans"
7. "Williams' Blood"
8. "Amazing Grace"
9. "Love Is the Drug"
10. "Pull Up to the Bumper"
11. "Slave to the Rhythm"
Van Morrison
1. "Too Late"
2. "Moondance"
3. "Have I Told You Lately"
4. "Days Like This"
5. "Precious Time"
6. "Sometimes We Cry"
7. "Think Twice Before You Go"
8. "Cleaning Windows"
9. "Carrying a Torch"
10. "All Work and No Play"
11. "Baby, Please Don't Go" / "Don't Start Crying Now" / "Custard Pie" / "Here Comes the Night"
12. "I Can't Stop Loving You"
13. "Whenever God Shines His Light"
14. "Magic Time"
15. "Jackie Wilson Said (I'm in Heaven When You Smile)"
16. "Wild Night"
17. "Enlightenment"
18. "In the Afternoon"
19. "Brown Eyed Girl"
20. "Gloria"

=== Mango ===
Thursday, 1 June	Friday, 2 June	Saturday, 3 June
**Slayer**; **Solange**; Triángulo de Amor Bizarro	Run the Jewels; Mac DeMarco; Whitney	**Arcade Fire**; Metronomy; Pond

Mango set lists
Slayer
1. "Repentless"
2. "The Antichrist"
3. "Disciple"
4. "Mandatory Suicide"
5. "War Ensemble"
6. "Hallowed Point"
7. "Captor of Sin"
8. "Postmortem"
9. "Seasons in the Abyss"
10. "Dead Skin Mask"
11. "Hate Worldwide"
12. "Raining Blood"
13. "South of Heaven"
14. "Angel of Death"
Solange
1. "Rise"
2. "Weary"
3. "Cranes in the Sky"
4. "Don't You Wait"
5. "Some Things Never Seem to Fucking Work"
6. "Mad"
7. "F.U.B.U."
8. "Locked in Closets"
9. "T.O.N.Y."
10. "Bad Girls"
11. "Junie"
12. "Losing You"
13. "Don't Touch My Hair"
14. "Rise" (Reprise)
Arcade Fire
1. "Wake Up"
2. "Everything Now"
3. "Haïti"
4. "Here Comes the Night Time"
5. "No Cars Go"
6. "Intervention"
7. "Neon Bible"
8. "The Suburbs"
9. "The Suburbs (Continued)"
10. "In the Backseat"
11. "Ready to Start"
12. "Sprawl II (Mountains Beyond Mountains)"
13. "Reflektor"
14. "Afterlife"
15. "We Exist"
16. "Creature Comfort"
17. "Neighborhood #3 (Power Out)"
18. "Rebellion (Lies)"
19. "Windowsill"

=== Primavera ===
Wednesday, 31 May	Thursday, 1 June	Friday, 2 June	Saturday, 3 June
Saint Etienne; Local Natives; Gordi; 7 Notas 7 Colores; Anímic	King Gizzard & the Lizard Wizard; Death Grips; Gojira; This Is Not This Heat; Cymbals Eat Guitars	Front 242; The Make-Up; Descendents; Sinkane; Slim Cessna's Auto Club	Japandroids; Sleep; Teenage Fanclub; Royal Trux; Weyes Blood

=== Ray-Ban ===
Thursday, 1 June	Friday, 2 June	Saturday, 3 June
DJ Tennis; Tycho; The Black Angels; The Afghan Whigs; Broken Social Scene; Mishima; Soledad Vélez	Talaboman; Flying Lotus; Sleaford Mods; Arab Strap; Sampha; Vaadat Charigim; El Petit de Cal Eril	DJ Coco; !!!; Wild Beasts; Seu Jorge; Angel Olsen; Junun featuring Shye Ben Tzur and the Rajasthan Express; Melange

=== Pitchfork ===
Thursday, 1 June	Friday, 2 June	Saturday, 3 June
Pinegrove; Converge; S U R V I V E; BadBadNotGood; Glass Animals; Alexandra Savior; Aries	Priests; Operators; Swans; William Tyler; Mitski; It's Not Not	Mannequin Pussy; Preoccupations; King Krule; Hamilton Leithauser; Joey Purp; Swet Shop Boys; Museless

=== adidas Originals ===
Thursday, 1 June	Friday, 2 June	Saturday, 3 June
Skinny Puppy; The Damned; Kae Tempest; The Molochs; Julia Jacklin; Nots; Kokoshca	Wand; Berri Txarrak; Fufanu; Shellac; Iosonouncane; Rebuig	Clubz; Against Me!; LVL UP; Julie Doiron; Jardín de la Croix; Agorazein; Les Cruet

=== Auditori Rockdelux ===
Thursday, 1 June	Friday, 2 June	Saturday, 3 June
The Zombies; Elza Soares; Annette Peacock; Nikki Lane	The Magnetic Fields; Phurpa; Kepa Junkera & Los Hermanos Cubero	Alex Cameron; Rosalía & Raül Refree; The Magnetic Fields

=== Night Pro ===
Thursday, 1 June	Friday, 2 June	Saturday, 3 June
Tired Lion; Entropia; Skegss; Hańba!; Gold Class; Miss Garrison; Joel Sarakula; Persian Pelican; De Mónaco; Adelaida; Jaaa!; Marley Bloo	Fingerfingerrr; Liniker e os Caramelows; Astronaut Project; Marrakesh; Patients; Billy Carter; Diealright; Leyya; Shijo X; Tiê; Inzul	Sharman Den; G-C; Tourista; No Metal In This Battle; Me & the Plant; Prairie WWWW; WRONGONYOU; Aeromoças e Tenistas Russas; Bike; Riviere; Radio 123

=== Heineken Hidden Stage ===
Wednesday, 31 May	Thursday, 1 June	Friday, 2 June	Saturday, 3 June
Dancefloor Meditations	Aldous Harding; Jens Lekman	The Radio Dept.; Lawrence Arabia	Thurston Moore; Surfin' Bichos

=== Firestone Stage ===
Thursday, 1 June	Friday, 2 June	Saturday, 3 June
Pinegrove	Sinkane	Jeremy Jay

=== Mango House ===
Thursday, 1 June	Friday, 2 June	Saturday, 3 June
Nikki Lane	Weyes Blood	Núria Graham

== Primavera a la Ciutat lineup ==
=== Sala Apolo ===
Monday, 29 May	Tuesday, 30 May	Wednesday, 31 May	Sunday, 4 June
The Wave Pictures; Jeremy Jay	Cigarettes After Sex; Let's Eat Grandma; Les Sueques	Marc Piñol; No Zu; Kae Tempest	Dave P.; Japandroids; Sleaford Mods; Shellac; Medalla

=== La [2] de Apolo ===
Tuesday, 30 May	Wednesday, 31 May	Sunday, 4 June
Entropia; Jaaa!; Hańba!	Elmini; The Wedding Present; Retirada!	!!!; Rrucculla; Pavvla; Odina; Marta Delmont

=== Barts ===
Wednesday, 31 May
- Romare
- Formation

=== Day Pro ===
Wednesday, 31 May	Thursday, 1 June	Friday, 2 June	Saturday, 3 June	Sunday, 4 June
RBP; Màquina Total; Pavvla; Odina; Astronaut Project; Inzul	Skegss; Tired Lion; Gordi; Gold Class; Joel Sarakula; Leyya; Shijo X; Escorpio	G-C; Radio 123; Miss Garrison; De Mónaco; Adelaida; Persian Pelican; Prairie WWWW; Riviere; Tourista	Lígula; Meridian Response; No Metal in This Battle; Patients; Marley Bloo; Diealright; Billy Carter	FingerFingerrr; Liniker e os Caramelows; Me & the Plant; WRONGONYOU; Bike; Marrakesh; Tiê; Aeromoças e Tenistas Russas

=== Seat ===
Friday, 2 June	Saturday, 3 June	Sunday, 4 June
Julia Jacklin; Nikki Lane; Conttra; Polseguera	Priests; Playback Maracas; The Wheels; Sorry Kate	!!!; The Make-Up; The Mystery Lights; LVL UP; Ocellot; The Waterparties; Maresme

=== Sala Teatre ===
Friday, 2 June	Saturday, 3 June	Sunday, 4 June
Nots; Alexandra Savior; Màquina Total; About Leaving	William Tyler; Her Little Donkey; Slim Cessna's Auto Club; Salfvman	Julie Doiron; Mannequin Pussy; Muñeco; Murdoc; Barbott; Alien Tango

== Primavera Bits lineup ==
=== Bacardí Live ===
Thursday, 1 June	Friday, 2 June	Saturday, 3 June
Bicep; Henrik Schwarz; Fatima Yamaha; Moscoman; Lord of the Isles; Vox Low; Romare; No Zu; Innercut	KiNK; Tuff City Kids; Polar Inertia; Abdulla Rashim; HVOB; Marie Davidson	Recondite; Ferenc; Weval; Gas; Huerco S.; Kelly Lee Owens; Autarkic; Sau Poler; Noga Erez

=== Desperados Club feat. Bowers & Wilkins Sound System ===
Thursday, 1 June	Friday, 2 June	Saturday, 3 June
Ben UFO; Pearson Sound; Joy Orbison; Matrixxman; Aurora Halal; Pender Street Steppers; Youandewan; Moscoman; Alexis Taylor; Jackmaster; Kiasmos; Discos Paradise Crew	Dixon; Âme; Michael Mayer; Kornél Kovács; Avalon Emerson; Huerco S.; Lord of the Isles; Autarkic; Ian Pooley; Fairmont; Patrick Codenys (Front 242); Sinkane; Shelby Grey	DJ Dustin; Khidja; John Talabot; Young Marco; Don't DJ; Vladimir Ivkovic; JMII; Dave P.; Golden Bug; !!!; Lauer; Marvin & Guy; Pedro Vian
