= Neighbourhood (disambiguation) =

A neighbourhood (also spelled neighborhood) is a geographically localised community within a larger city, town, suburb or rural area.

Neighbo(u)rhood(s) may also refer to:

== Mathematics ==
- Neighbourhood (mathematics), a concept in topology
- Neighbourhood (graph theory), a grouping in graph theory
- the Moore neighborhood and Von Neumann neighborhood, used in describing cellular automata

== Music ==
- Neighbourhood (album), a 2005 album by Manu Katché
- Neighborhoods (Ernest Hood album), 1975
- Neighborhoods (Olu Dara album), 2001
- Neighborhoods (Blink-182 album), 2011
- "Neighbourhood" (song), a 1995 song by British indie rock band Space
- Four songs by Arcade Fire from their 2004 album Funeral:
  - "Neighborhood #1 (Tunnels)"
  - "Neighborhood #2 (Laika)"
  - "Neighborhood #3 (Power Out)"
- "Neighbourhood", a 2000 song by Zed Bias
- Neighborhood Records, a record label
- The Neighborhood (album), 1990 album by Los Lobos
- The Neighbourhood, an American rock band
  - The Neighbourhood (album), the band's self-titled album

== Other uses ==
- Neighbourhood (TV series), a Chinese TV series
- Neighborhood Channel, a subchannel of WQED-TV in Pittsburgh, Pennsylvania, United States
- Neighborhood (role-playing game), a 1982 role-playing game
- The Neighborhood (novel), 2016 novel by Mario Vargas Llosa
- The Neighborhood (TV series), American comedy series
- The Neighbourhood (British TV series), British series
- The Neighborhood (film), 2017 Canadian film
- The Neighborhood, comic strip by Jerry Van Amerongen

== See also ==
- Hood (disambiguation)
