= Neighbor =

A neighbor or neighbour generally refers to someone or something within some neighbourhood (disambiguation) of the subject.

Neighbo(u)r(s) may also refer to:

== Films ==
- Neighbors (1920 film), a short film starring Buster Keaton
- Neighbors (1937 film), a Polish film
- Neighbours (1952 film), a 1952 short film by Norman McLaren
- Neighbours (1966 film), a Danish film
- Neighbors (1971 film), a TV film starring Cicely Tyson
- The Neighbor (1973 film), directed by Luigi Cozzi for a TV show called Door into Darkness
- Neighbors (1981 film), a film based on Berger's novel, starring John Belushi and Dan Aykroyd
- Neighbors (Chinese film), a 1981 Chinese film
- The Neighbor (1993 film), starring Rod Steiger
- The Neighbor (2007 film), starring Matthew Modine and Michèle Laroque
- Neighbor (2009 film), a 2009 horror film written and directed by Robert A. Masciantonio
- Neighbors (2010 film), a film featuring Gil Bellows
- The Neighbor (2012 film), a South Korean film
- Neighbors (2014 American film) (also known as Bad Neighbours), a film starring Seth Rogen and Zac Efron
- Neighbours (2014 Indian film), an Indian horror film
- The Neighbor (2016 film), a thriller co-written and directed by Marcus Dunstan
- The Neighbor (2017 film), a thriller co-written, co-produced and directed by Aaron Harvey and starring William Fichtner
- Neighbours (2021 film), a Swiss/French film set in Kurdistan

== Literature ==
- My Neighbor, a 1917 short story by Franz Kafka
- Neighbors (novel), a 1980 novel by Thomas Berger
- "Neighbors" (short story), a 1976 short story by Raymond Carver
- Neighbors: The Destruction of the Jewish Community in Jedwabne, Poland, a 2001 book by Jan T. Gross
- The Neighbors (comic strip), a comic strip by George Clark
- The Neighbors, a novel by Ahmad Mahmoud
- The Neighbor, a 2009 novel by Lisa Gardner

== Music ==
- Neighbors (album), a 1988 album by the Reels
- "Neighbours" (Rolling Stones song), 1981
- Neighbours (Camouflage song), 1988
- "Neighbors", a song by the Academy Is..., from the album Santi
- "Neighbors" (J. Cole song), 2017
- Neighbors (Pooh Shiesty song), 2021
- "Neighbor", a song by Ugly Kid Joe from America's Least Wanted
- "Neighbor", a song by Juicy J featuring Travis Scott
- "The Neighbor" (song), by the Dixie Chicks
- Theme to "Neighbours" (or simply "Neighbours"), from the eponymous Australian soap opera and a 1988 single by Barry Crocker

== Television ==
=== Series ===
- Neighbours, an Australian soap opera
  - Neighbours: The Music, a 2002 soundtrack album from the show
- Neighbors (TV series), a 2026 documentary series
- The Neighbor (TV series), a 2019 Spanish comedy series
- The Neighbors (game show), an American game show starring Regis Philbin
- The Neighbors (2012 TV series), an American sci-fi sitcom
- The Neighbors (2015 TV series), a TV series developed by Tommy Wiseau

=== Episodes ===
- "Neighbour" (Not Going Out), 2009
- "Neighbors" (Entourage), 2005
- "Neighbours" (The Armando Iannucci Shows), 2001
- "The Neighbor" (The Amazing World of Gumball), 2018
- "The Neighbour" (The Cleaner), 2021
- "Neighbors", a season 4 episode of Servant (TV series)

== Mathematics ==
- In graph theory, a neighbor or neighbour of a vertex is another vertex that is connected to it by an edge
- Neighbourhood is one of the basic concepts in a topological space

== Other uses ==
- Neighbors (surname)
- Neighbour, Australian Aboriginal hero also known as Ayaigar
- Neighbor (company), peer-to-peer storage company
- Neighbor Mountain, Virginia
- Nauvoo Neighbor, a weekly newspaper edited and published by Latter Day Saint Apostle John Taylor in Nauvoo, Illinois from 1843 to 1845
- The Neighbor (newspaper), from Indiana
- The Neighbours, sculpture by Siegfried Charoux in London
- Neighbours (sculpture), a sculpture by Joe Rosenthal
- Hello Neighbor, video game from Tiny Build
  - Hello Neighbor: Hide and Seek, a spin-off of the game by Tiny Build
- Neighbors (app), a neighborhood watch app offered by Amazon and Ring
- The subject of the Great Commandment

== See also ==
- Parable of the Good Samaritan, a parable of Jesus that was told in response to the question, "Who is my neighbor?"
- Jim Nabors (1930–2017), American actor
- Neighbors Expedition, led by Robert Neighbors to explore the area between San Antonio and El Paso
