= Cold Wind =

Single by Arcade Fire

from the album Six Feet Under, Vol. 2: Everything Ends
- Released: 2005
- Genre: Indie rock
- Length: 3:12
- Label: Merge Records
- Songwriter(s): William Butler, Win Butler, Régine Chassagne, Tim Kingsbury, Richard Reed Parry
- Producer(s): Arcade Fire

Arcade Fire singles chronology
"Neighborhood #3 (Power Out)" (2005)	"Cold Wind" (2005)	"Rebellion (Lies)" (2005)

"Cold Wind" is a song by Canadian indie rock band Arcade Fire. The song is not found on any of their studio albums. It was released as a single in August 2005 via Merge Records, and was featured on the television soundtrack album Six Feet Under, Vol. 2: Everything Ends. The song was played live during the band's encore on June 1, 2007 at Berkeley's Hearst Greek Theatre, as the song's lyrics refer to San Francisco.

The single was pressed on clear 7" vinyl and featured the band's cover of "Brazil" (a.k.a. "Aquarela do Brasil"). The single is out of print.

== Critical reception ==
Gary Mulholland of The Observer named "Cold Wind" the song of the month, calling it "extraordinarily beautiful". Jason Ankeny of AllMusic called the song "an atmospheric but slight effort", saying the production must have been made while falling asleep but called the cover of "Brazil" "lovely".

== Track listing ==
1. "Cold Wind" – 3:12
2. "Brazil" – 3:54
