= Creature Comfort =

2017 single by Arcade Fire

Single by Arcade Fire

from the album Everything Now
- Released: June 16, 2017
- Genre: Synth-pop
- Length: 4:43
- Label: Columbia
- Songwriters: Will Butler; Win Butler; Régine Chassagne; Jeremy Gara; Tim Kingsbury; Richard Reed Parry
- Producers: Arcade Fire; Geoff Barrow; Steve Mackey

Arcade Fire singles chronology
"Everything Now" (2017)	"Creature Comfort" (2017)	"Signs of Life" (2017)

Music video
- "Creature Comfort" on YouTube

"Creature Comfort" is a song by Canadian indie rock band Arcade Fire. It was released on June 16, 2017, as the second single from the band's fifth studio album, Everything Now. The song was co-produced by Portishead's Geoff Barrow and Pulp bassist Steve Mackey.

== Music video ==
The "Creature Comfort" music video was directed by Tarik Mikou. The video depicts the members of Arcade Fire wearing shiny golden suits performing in a plainly decorated room as a strobe light flashes intermittently. The song's lyrics scroll via a ticker with the lead vocals at the bottom and the backing vocals at the top. Stephen Thompson of NPR interpreted the video as complementing the band's narrative on the album: "unrealistic expectations, pressure to conform, and the exhausting din of modern life."

== Promotion and release ==
Arcade Fire first performed "Creature Comfort" on June 1, 2017, at the Primavera Sound festival in Barcelona. On June 14, Arcade Fire posted a teaser for the studio version of the song on their Facebook page. The clip took the form of a mock advertisement for a 100% marshmallow breakfast cereal that contains methylphenidate, or Ritalin, and ended with a warning that the marshmallows "are not approved for consumption in the United States and Canada". The band also revealed that they had distributed Creature Comfort cereal boxes at several locations around Dublin. Fans who found the cereal received entry to an afterparty at Whelan's that night following the band's performance at Malahide Castle. "Creature Comfort" was released as a download on June 16, 2017 on streaming and digital media services.

== Reception ==
"Creature Comfort" received critical acclaim from critics and fans upon release; many noted its moving lyrics and tight instrumentation. Elias Leight of Rolling Stone likened the song to The Human League's "Seconds" and The Knife's "Heartbeats" and wrote: "Underneath the curtain of synthesizers, ringing power chords, pulverizing drums and cheerfully shouted backing vocals, lead singer Win Butler tells a grim tale about cultural pressures that lead men and women to hate themselves." In reviews for the song in The Independent, Jacob Stolworthy said the track "signals that Arcade Fire's best days may not be behind them", and Christopher Hooton remarked, "It's the kind of song where you don't know whether to cry or dance, and that's probably the best kind."

Graeme Thomson of Uncut likened "Creature Comfort" to the music of OMD, adding, "With its Oberheim Two Voice synth sweeps, crisp beats and Régine Chassagne's helium backing vocals, it's a deceptively danceable anthem for the death-fixated, fame-hungry iGeneration." In Spin, Jeremy Gordon described the synthesizer that sets the song's tempo as "the sonic realization of the band's decade-old dream about the dark mystery of the city." Jillian Mapes of Pitchfork said that while the song "will stop someone from doing something rash ... Arcade Fire are pompous about knowing that, throwing their arms wide around the problem and presenting their own music as the solution."

== Credits and personnel ==
Arcade Fire

- Win Butler – vocals, electric guitar
- Régine Chassagne – vocals, keytar
- Richard Reed Parry – electric guitar, backing vocals
- William Butler – keyboards, backing vocals
- Tim Kingsbury – bass guitar, backing vocals
- Jeremy Gara – drums

Additional musicians

- Geoff Barrow – synthesizer
- Akia Nevills – vocals
- Tracci Lee – vocals
- Kayla Jasmine – vocals
- Jelly Joseph – vocals

Recording personnel

- Geoff Barrow – production
- Steve Mackey – production
- Arcade Fire – production
- Iain Berryman – engineering
- Korey Richey – engineering
- Mark Lawson – engineering
- Eric Heigle – engineering
- Max Prior – assistant engineering
- Craig Silvey – mixing
- Greg Calbi – mastering

== Charts ==
Chart (2017–2018)	Peak position
Belgium (Ultratip Bubbling Under Flanders)	6
Canada Rock (Billboard)	10
France (SNEP)	142
Scottish Singles Sales (Official Charts)	91
US Hot Rock & Alternative Songs (Billboard)	28

== Certifications ==
Region	Certification	Certified units/sales
Canada (Music Canada)	Gold	40,000^{‡}
^{‡} Sales+streaming figures based on certification alone.
