= Everything Now =

- Cover art for digital versions

Studio album by Arcade Fire
- Released: July 28, 2017
- Recorded: September 2016 – April 2017
- Studio: Boombox, New Orleans; Sonovox, Montreal; Gang, Paris
- Genre: Dance-rock
- Length: 47:11
- Label: Sonovox; Columbia; Rough Trade
- Producer: Arcade Fire; Thomas Bangalter; Steve Mackey

Arcade Fire chronology
Reflektor (2013)	Everything Now (2017)	Her (Original Score) (2021)

Singles from Everything Now
- 1. "Everything Now" Released: June 1, 2017; 2. "Creature Comfort" Released: June 16, 2017; 3. "Signs of Life" Released: June 30, 2017; 4. "Electric Blue" Released: July 13, 2017; 5. "Put Your Money on Me" Released: January 19, 2018

Everything Now is the fifth studio album by Canadian indie rock band Arcade Fire, released on July 28, 2017, through Sonovox Records (physical release), Columbia Records and Rough Trade Records. It was produced by Arcade Fire, alongside Thomas Bangalter, of the electronic-house duo Daft Punk, and Steve Mackey, the bassist of the band Pulp. Additionally, Markus Dravs, one of Arcade Fire's frequent collaborators, co-produced two tracks, and he, Geoff Barrow of Portishead, and Eric Heigle each provided additional production on one track.

The album is a departure from the sound of Arcade Fire's previous records, influenced as it is by synth-pop, dance-rock, and other derivatives of electronic music, and has been called more "digestible" than their earlier output. It was promoted by an elaborate marketing campaign, as well as five singles: the title track, "Creature Comfort", "Signs of Life", "Electric Blue", and "Put Your Money on Me".

Upon release, Everything Now proved polarizing with critics—some reviews said it was a misstep for the band, but several publications named it one of the best albums of the year. It reached the top of the charts in numerous countries, including Arcade Fire's home country of Canada, the US, and the UK.

== Promotion ==
In May 2017, Arcade Fire performed six new songs at an intimate secret show in Montreal. Later that month, a Twitter account designed to look like a Russian spambot started publishing clues pertaining to a new Arcade Fire album.

On May 31, the band released the lead single "Everything Now" on 12" vinyl, selling it at a merchandise stall at the Primavera Sound festival in Barcelona, which they headlined. A day later, a mysterious live stream called "Live From Death Valley" was launched, and the band released a music video for "Everything Now" that appeared to have been shot in Death Valley, California.

On June 3, anagrams of song titles were published on Twitter.

On June 16, the band posted the music video for "Creature Comfort" on its YouTube page. It was marketed with a Facebook post that was purportedly written by a disgruntled "Everything Now Corp" employee, in which he railed against the band's refusal to engage in corporate promotion of its new album.

Similar satirical marketing done in promotion of the album stemmed from a fictional agreement the band was in: a "360 degree agreement" proposed by Everything Now Corp, whereby the band created multiple fake online articles related to events happening within the company and band. These include, but are not limited to, the band providing a "premature premature evaluation" of Everything Now days before release as a spoof of online music reviews, a review of a fake installment in the rhythm video game series Rock Band titled Arcade Fire: Rock Band, and fake advertisements for products based on the names of songs from Everything Now. A collection of promotional articles created by the band are included on the side of a fake website that leads to numerous other fake websites.

=== Infinite Content tour ===
To promote the album, the band embarked on the Infinite Content tour across Europe and North and South America. Preceding the album's release, the band went on a near two-month-long tour of Europe, headlining festivals and their own shows, which included appearances at some smaller venues. They extended the tour into 2018 to cover more venues in Europe and North America, following the Arena leg of the North American tour, the band played an additional leg in 2018 at smaller venues.

== Artwork ==
The front cover of the album features a picture of an art installation in Death Valley created by the artist JR for the band that consisted of a billboard depicting a mountain range placed in front of the actual mountain range depicted on the billboard, which comments on the blurry line between artifice and reality in the modern world; the album's title appears on a sign below the billboard. The back cover features a man riding a horse, a camp fire, and an arcade machine on fire (a visual pun on the band's name). The entire scene was shot in many different lighting and weather conditions, and two variants of the artwork, labelled "Day" and "Night", were created for CD pressings, while twenty variants of the artwork were created for vinyl pressings, each with the title on the front cover in a different language and a unique photograph of the mountain-and-billboard-scene. The shrink wrap around the album had a radial dotted-line pattern on the front, suggesting the sky in the photograph was printed on the inside of a large dome structure, and a tracklist on the back, which was disguised as the logos of fictional companies that financed the album.

As a continuation of the commercialization theme, the booklet for the album was formatted to resemble a flyer for a supermarket, with the song durations appearing like dollar amounts.

== Reception ==
Professional ratings
Aggregate scores
Source	Rating
AnyDecentMusic?	6.5/10
Metacritic	66/100
Review scores
Source	Rating
AllMusic	3/5 stars
The A.V. Club	B
Chicago Tribune	2/4 stars
Entertainment Weekly	B+
The Guardian	3/5 stars
The Independent	5/5 stars
NME	5/5 stars
Pitchfork	5.6/10
Q	3/5 stars
Rolling Stone	4/5 stars

At Metacritic, which assigns a normalized rating out of 100 to reviews from mainstream critics, Everything Now received an average score of 66 based on 39 reviews, indicating "generally favorable reviews"; some critics praised the album as one of the year's best, while others stated it was a serious misstep for the band.

Jeremy Winograd of Slant Magazine claimed that "The result is by far Arcade Fire's most upbeat and easily digestible album to date." Barry Nicolson of NME rated the album five stars out of five and wrote that "The Canadian art-rockers are bigger, bolder and more fearful of the future than ever". Will Hermes of Rolling Stone praised the album for its lyrical content, writing that it is "treacherous territory, but the band navigates it bravely, especially when it turns the critical lens on itself."

In a mixed review for The Guardian, Alexis Petridis wrote that the "desire to experiment musically isn't enough to make Everything Now a bad album – there are songs worth hearing and genuinely thrilling music here – but rather a flawed one." Jon Pareles of The New York Times wrote that "The title song finds a breezy balance between earnestness and exhilaration. Elsewhere, that balance falters, and Everything Now becomes a slighter album than its predecessors." Equally negative, Brendan Frank of Pretty Much Amazing wrote that "For the first time in their career, Arcade Fire haven’t made a record; they've manufactured one." Jeremy Larson of Pitchfork wrote that "Conceptually, the songs don't transcend their social critique, they succumb to it." Robert Christgau wrote in 2018 that he had only "laid off" the album because he did not "feel obliged to nail down every possible Honorable Mention"; he mused it might deserve a "One-Star Honorable Mention" (which means "a worthy effort consumers attuned to its overriding aesthetic or individual vision may well like"), but said he did not "consider it [his] obligation to history to make that call."

=== Accolades ===
Publication	Accolade	Year	Rank	Ref.
Drowned in Sound	Favourite Albums of 2017	2017	100	
NME	NME's Albums of the Year 2017	2017	29	

== Commercial performance ==
Everything Now debuted at number one on the Billboard 200 chart in the US with 100,000 album-equivalent units, of which 94,000 were pure album sales. It is Arcade Fire's third US number-one album.

== Track listing ==
All tracks are written by Arcade Fire.

Everything Now
No.	Title	Producer(s)	Length
1.	"Everything_Now (Continued)"	Arcade Fire	0:46
2.	"Everything Now"	Arcade Fire; Steve Mackey; Thomas Bangalter	5:03
3.	"Signs of Life"	Arcade Fire; Mackey; Bangalter	4:36
4.	"Creature Comfort"	Arcade Fire; Mackey; Geoff Barrow	4:43
5.	"Peter Pan"	Arcade Fire; Mackey; Markus Dravs	2:48
6.	"Chemistry"	Arcade Fire; Dravs	3:37
7.	"Infinite Content"	Arcade Fire	1:37
8.	"Infinite_Content"	Arcade Fire	1:41
9.	"Electric Blue"	Arcade Fire; Mackey; Bangalter; Dravs	4:02
10.	"Good God Damn"	Arcade Fire; Mackey	3:34
11.	"Put Your Money on Me"	Arcade Fire; Mackey; Bangalter; Eric Heigle	5:53
12.	"We Don't Deserve Love"	Arcade Fire	6:29
13.	"Everything Now (Continued)"	Arcade Fire	2:22
Total length:			47:11

== Credits and personnel ==
Credits adapted from liner notes and Tidal.

Arcade Fire

- Win Butler – vocals, bass guitar, electric guitar
- Régine Chassagne – vocals, piano, keyboards, keytar
- Richard Reed Parry – electric guitar, bass guitar, backing vocals
- Tim Kingsbury – acoustic guitar, electric guitar, bass guitar, backing vocals
- Will Butler – keyboards, bass guitar, backing vocals
- Jeremy Gara – drums

Additional musicians

- Sarah Neufeld – backing vocals, string arrangements (tracks 3, 10), strings (tracks 1–3, 6–8, 10, 11, 13)
- Owen Pallett – string arrangements, piano (track 6), strings (tracks 1–3, 6–8, 10, 11, 13)
- Arcade Fire – string arrangements
- Daniel Lanois – pedal steel (tracks 11, 12)
- Thomas Bangalter – synthesizer (track 2), programming (track 11)
- Geoff Barrow – synthesizer (track 4)
- Mark Lawson – MPC (track 6)
- Stuart Bogie – saxophone (tracks 3, 5, 6), flute (track 5)
- Matt Bauder – saxophone (track 6)
- Charlie Gabriel – saxophone (track 5)
- Patrick Bebey – pygmy flute (track 2)
- Willonson Duprate – congas (tracks 3, 5, 6, 10)
- Jean "Diol Kidi" Edmond – congas (tracks 3, 5, 6, 10)
- Korey Richey – drum machine (track 3)
- Rebecca Crenshaw – strings (tracks 1–3, 10, 13)
- Helen Gillet – strings (tracks 1–3, 10, 13)
- Harmonistic Praise Crusade Choir (track 2)
- Akia Nevills – choir vocals (tracks 4, 6)
- Kayla Jasmine – choir vocals (tracks 4, 6)
- Tracci Lee – choir vocals (tracks 4, 6)
- Jelly Joseph – choir vocals (tracks 4, 6)

Production

- Arcade Fire – production
- Steve Mackey – production
- Thomas Bangalter – production
- Markus Dravs – co-production (tracks 5, 9), additional production (track 6)
- Geoff Barrow – additional production (track 4)
- Eric Heigle – additional production (track 11), recording
- Mark Lawson – additional recording
- Iain Berryman – additional recording
- Korey Richey – additional recording
- Florian Lagatta – additional recording
- Craig Silvey – mixing
- Max Prior – mixing assistance
- Greg Calbi – mastering

Design

- JR – artwork
- Marc Azoulay – artwork assistance
- Camille Pajot – artwork assistance
- Guillaume Cagniard – artwork assistance
- Ping Pong Ping – album graphic design
- Anton Corbijn – band portrait

== Charts ==
=== Weekly charts ===
Chart (2017)	Peak position
Australian Albums (ARIA)	2
Austrian Albums (Ö3 Austria)	4
Belgian Albums (Ultratop Flanders)	1
Belgian Albums (Ultratop Wallonia)	1
Canadian Albums (Billboard)	1
Czech Albums (ČNS IFPI)	10
Danish Albums (Hitlisten)	17
Dutch Albums (Album Top 100)	2
Finnish Albums (Suomen virallinen lista)	30
French Albums (SNEP)	3
German Albums (Offizielle Top 100)	5
Hungarian Albums (MAHASZ)	26
Irish Albums (IRMA)	1
Italian Albums (FIMI)	5
New Zealand Albums (RMNZ)	15
Norwegian Albums (VG-lista)	11
Polish Albums (ZPAV)	14
Portuguese Albums (AFP)	1
Scottish Albums (OCC)	1
Spanish Albums (Promusicae)	2
Swedish Albums (Sverigetopplistan)	18
Swiss Albums (Schweizer Hitparade)	2
UK Albums (OCC)	1
US Billboard 200	1
US Top Alternative Albums (Billboard)	1
US Top Rock Albums (Billboard)	1

=== Year-end charts ===
Chart (2017)	Position
Belgian Albums (Ultratop Flanders)	22
Belgian Albums (Ultratop Wallonia)	102
Canadian Albums (Billboard)	22
French Albums (SNEP)	185
UK Albums (OCC)	93
US Top Rock Albums (Billboard)	38

Chart (2018)	Position
Belgian Albums (Ultratop Flanders)	67

== Certifications and sales ==
Region	Certification	Certified units/sales
Canada (Music Canada)	Platinum	80,000^{‡}
United Kingdom (BPI)	Gold	100,000^{‡}
Summaries
Worldwide	—	500,000
^{‡} Sales+streaming figures based on certification alone.
