= Policy (Will Butler album) =

Studio album by Will Butler
- Released: 10 March 2015
- Recorded: Electric Lady Studios
- Genre: Indie rock, garage rock, indie pop
- Length: 27:20
- Label: Merge

Will Butler chronology
Policy (2015)	Friday Night (2016)

Policy is the debut solo album by Will Butler, best known for his work in Canadian indie rock band Arcade Fire. The album was released on March 10, 2015 by Merge Records.

== Concept ==
Butler set out to make an album akin to what he calls "American Music". Butler has stated that "Policy is American music—in the tradition of the Violent Femmes, The Breeders, The Modern Lovers, Bob Dylan, Smokey Robinson, The Magnetic Fields, Ghostface Killah, and John Lennon (I know, but it counts)." He has called this type of music "Music where the holy fool runs afoul of the casual world".

== Recording and release ==
Policy was recorded in a week in Jimi Hendrix's old living room, which is now Studio C at Electric Lady Studios. Butler recorded it during a short break on Arcade Fire's Reflektor tour. All songs were recorded there, with the exception of "Something's Coming", which was recorded in Aaron Dessner's home recording studio, the recording place of The National. Additional work for the song was done in the basement of drummer Jeremy Gara. Most of the instrumentation had been done by Butler, with the exception of drums that were done by Gara, also of Arcade Fire. He also "Had a couple of friends come in to do clarinet, saxophone and backing vocals".

The album was released on March 10, 2015, on the Merge Records website. The album was released digitally as a CD and an LP. Two singles were released before the launch of the album. They were "Take My Side" and "Anna". Both songs were released on the label's SoundCloud page, and a music video for "Anna" was released on Butler's YouTube channel.

== Reception ==
Professional ratings
Aggregate scores
Source	Rating
Metacritic	72/100
Review scores
Source	Rating
NOW	4/5 stars
Spin	8/10
Pitchfork Media	6.6/10
NME	7/10
Rolling Stone	3/5 stars
Magnet	8.5/10
Exclaim!	6/10
Slant Magazine	3.5/5 stars

Policy received mostly positive reviews upon its release. It holds a Metacritic score of 72/100, aggregating "generally favorable reviews". A review from Rolling Stone praised the album for its intent on making what Butler calls "American Music", while still retaining a little bit of Arcade Fire, saying that "The first solo album by the younger Butler sibling in Arcade Fire is less than half the length of his band's 2013 Reflektor. Policy is also more playful, a montage of impulses — crunchy rock, apocalyptic electro-disco, solo-John Lennon balladry — that come like whiplash... In the melodic arc of "Son of God", a slice of The Suburbs skinned down to the folk-rock jitters of the Violent Femmes." SPIN said "This is the birth of Will Butler, solo artist, whose career seems just as woozily unpredictable and captivating as that of his 'day job'". Dean Essner of Consequence of Sound had mixed feelings about Policy: "May just be too slight to be successful, forcing its shortcomings to be amplified even if there are, in fact, many things to enjoy about this record".

== Track listing ==
All tracks are written by Will Butler, except where noted

No.	Title	Lyrics	Length
1.	"Take My Side"		3:48
2.	"Anna"		3:52
3.	"Finish What I Started"		2:21
4.	"Son of God"		2:53
5.	"Something's Coming"	Butler, Marcel Dzama, Jeremy Gara, Tim Kingsbury	3:18
6.	"What I Want"		4:10
7.	"Sing to Me"		3:24
8.	"Witness"		3:29
Total length:			27:20

== Personnel ==
All other artists who worked on Policy are unnamed by Butler.

- Will Butler – guitar, vocals, bass
- Jeremy Gara – drums
