= Everything Now (song) =

- Digital release cover art

Single by Arcade Fire

from the album Everything Now
- B-side: Instrumental (12")
- Released: May 31, 2017
- Genre: Dance-rock; indie rock; pop
- Length: 5:03
- Label: Columbia
- Songwriters: Will Butler; Win Butler; Régine Chassagne; Jeremy Gara; Tim Kingsbury; Richard Reed Parry
- Producers: Arcade Fire; Thomas Bangalter; Steve Mackey

Arcade Fire singles chronology
"I Give You Power" (2017)	"Everything Now" (2017)	"Creature Comfort" (2017)

"Everything Now" is a song by Canadian indie rock band Arcade Fire. It was released on June 1, 2017, as the first single from the band's fifth studio album, Everything Now (2017). It was produced by Thomas Bangalter, Steve Mackey and the band itself. The song samples "The Coffee Cola Song" by Francis Bebey. "Everything Now" is Arcade Fire's first number-one hit on a Billboard chart.

== Release ==
Before playing "Neighborhood 1 (Tunnels)" during their Sunday headlining set at the 2016 Voodoo Music + Arts Experience in New Orleans, Arcade Fire recorded the audience singing a melody off their upcoming album, which became "Everything Now". The first release of the song came during the Primavera Sound festival in Barcelona, Spain on May 31, 2017. At the festival, a limited edition orange 12" vinyl single was made for sale at a merchandise stand. "Everything Now" acted as the A-side and its instrumental acted as the B-side. Digital versions of the song were released on the following day. On June 9, the 12" single became available again at record stores in the United States and United Kingdom.

== Music video ==
A music video for "Everything Now" was released on June 1, 2017, through YouTube. It was directed by The Sacred Egg and shot in Los Angeles and in parts of the Karoo, in South Africa.

== Track listing ==
Side A
No.	Title	Length
1.	"Everything Now"	5:03

Side B
No.	Title	Length
1.	"Everything Now" (Instrumental)	5:03

== Credits and personnel ==
Arcade Fire

- Win Butler – lead vocals, bass guitar
- Régine Chassagne – piano, backing vocals
- Richard Reed Parry – electric guitar, backing vocals
- William Butler – keyboards, backing vocals
- Tim Kingsbury – acoustic guitar, backing vocals
- Jeremy Gara – drums

Additional musicians

- Harmonistic Praise Crusade – choir
- Thomas Bangalter – synthesizer
- Rebecca Crenshaw – strings
- Helen Gillet – strings
- Owen Pallett – strings, orchestral arrangements
- Sarah Neufeld – strings
- Patrick Bebey – flute

Recording personnel

- Thomas Bangalter – production
- Steve Mackey – production
- Arcade Fire – production, mixing
- Mark Lawson – engineering
- Iain Berryman – engineering
- Florian Lagatta – engineering
- Eric Heigle – engineering
- Max Prior – assistant engineering
- Craig Silvey – mixing
- Greg Calbi – mastering

== Charts ==
=== Weekly charts ===
Chart (2017)	Peak position
Argentina Anglo (Monitor Latino)	16
Australia (ARIA Hitseekers)	11
Belgium (Ultratop 50 Flanders)	21
Belgium (Ultratop 50 Wallonia)	20
Canada (Canadian Hot 100)	70
Canada AC (Billboard)	46
Canada Rock (Billboard)	19
France (SNEP)	32
Iceland (RÚV)	2
Ireland (IRMA)	71
Netherlands Single Tip (MegaCharts)	26
Poland (LP3)	23
Portugal (AFP)	68
Scotland Singles (OCC)	22
Spain (PROMUSICAE)	21
Switzerland (Schweizer Hitparade)	99
UK Singles (OCC)	50
US Hot Rock & Alternative Songs (Billboard)	11
US Rock & Alternative Airplay (Billboard)	16

=== Year-end charts ===
Chart (2017)	Position
Belgium (Ultratop Flanders)	74
Belgium (Ultratop Wallonia)	92
Iceland (Tónlistinn)	27
US Hot Rock Songs (Billboard)	55
US Rock Airplay Songs (Billboard)	50

== Certifications ==
Region	Certification	Certified units/sales
Australia (ARIA)	Gold	35,000^{‡}
Canada (Music Canada)	Platinum	80,000^{‡}
Mexico (AMPROFON)	Gold	30,000^{‡}
Portugal (AFP)	Gold	5,000^{‡}
United Kingdom (BPI)	Gold	400,000^{‡}
^{‡} Sales+streaming figures based on certification alone.

== Release history ==
Region	Date	Label	Format	Catalog no.
Spain	May 31, 2017	Columbia	12"	88985447841
Worldwide	June 1, 2017	Columbia	Digital download	—
US, UK	June 9, 2017	Columbia	12"	88985447841
