= Neighbors (surname) =

Neighbors (or Neighbor, Neighbour, or Neighbours) is a surname of English origin.

People with the surname include:

- Billy Neighbors (1940–2012), American former football player
- Cindy Neighbor (born 1972), former member of the Kansas House of Representatives
- Jake Neighbours (born 2002), Canadian ice hockey player
- Jimmy Neighbour (1950–2009), English footballer
- Mike Neighbors (born 1969), American professional basketball coach
- Robert Neighbors (1815–1859), Indian agent and Texas state legislator
  - Neighbors Expedition, led by Robert Neighbors to explore the area between San Antonio and El Paso
- Roy Neighbors (1923–2017), American politician
- Tyson Neighbors (born 2002), American baseball player
- William D. Neighbors (born 1939), American attorney, judge, and arbitrator

== See also ==
- Neighbor (disambiguation)
- Nabors (surname)
