= Funeral (Arcade Fire album) =

Studio album by Arcade Fire
- Released: September 14, 2004
- Recorded: 2003–2004
- Studio: Hotel2Tango (Montreal)
- Genres: Indie rock; chamber pop; art rock; baroque pop; symphonic rock
- Length: 48:02
- Languages: English; French
- Label: Merge
- Producer: Arcade Fire

Arcade Fire chronology
Arcade Fire (2003)	Funeral (2004)	Neon Bible (2007)

Singles from Funeral
- 1. "Neighborhood #1 (Tunnels)" Released: June 20, 2004; 2. "Neighborhood #2 (Laïka)" Released: March 28, 2005; 3. "Neighborhood #3 (Power Out)" Released: May 22, 2005; 4. "Rebellion (Lies)" Released: September 12, 2005; 5. "Wake Up" Released: November 14, 2005

Funeral is the debut studio album by Canadian indie rock band Arcade Fire, released on September 14, 2004 by Merge Records. Preliminary recordings for Funeral were made during the course of a week in August 2003 at the Hotel2Tango in Montreal, Quebec, and the recording was completed later that year all in an analogue recording format. Its lyrics draw upon themes of death, change, and the loss of childhood innocence, inspired by the recent passing of several bandmates' family members during its production. The first half of the album, dubbed the 'Neighborhood' suite, centres around a town struggling with a power outage in the middle of winter, based on personal experience during the North American ice storm of 1998.

The album produced five singles, with "Rebellion (Lies)" being the most successful, having peaked at number 19 on the UK Singles Chart. The album was nominated for a Grammy Award in 2005 for Best Alternative Music Album. It received widespread critical acclaim and topped many year-end and decade-end lists, now often considered one of the greatest albums of all time. According to the website Metacritic, the album had the second most appearances on end-of-decade Top 10 lists, only behind Radiohead's Kid A. In 2012, Rolling Stone ranked Funeral number 151 on their revised list of the "500 Greatest Albums of All Time"; it dropped to number 500 in the 2020 version.

== Background ==
Funeral was largely recorded over the course of a week at the Hotel2Tango in Montreal, Quebec in August 2003. Additional recording also took place at Régine Chassagne and Win Butler's apartment, and the album was completed in 2004. The production cost of the album was estimated to be around $10,000.

The album was given its title because several band members had recently lost members of their families; Régine Chassagne's grandmother died in June 2003, Win and William Butler's grandfather (swing musician Alvino Rey) in February 2004, and Richard Reed Parry's aunts in April 2004.

== Artwork ==
The artwork for Funeral was designed by artist and photographer Tracy Maurice, depicting a scrawling quill with foliage growing from its feathers, painted onto a piece of a wooden planter. Maurice, then a Montreal-based artist, had been introduced by a mutual friend to Win Butler, who was looking for the artwork of the band's debut album. Chassagne and Butler took a liking to Maurice's drawings and commissioned her for the task. The design was inspired by Maurice's own collection of antique photographs and early 20th-century illustrated books, as well as the aesthetics of Japanese woodblock prints and Donovan's album Barabajagal.

== Release ==
Funeral was released in Canada and the US on September 14, 2004, and in the UK on February 28, 2005. A highly positive review from Pitchfork, which gave the album a 9.7 out of 10 rating, was frequently cited as a key factor that propelled Funeral into widespread recognition and commercial success. The album entered the Billboard 200 chart, a first for Merge Records; it was also the fastest-seller in the label's history. By November 2005, the album had sold over half a million copies worldwide, and by March 2007 it had sold nearly 750,000 copies worldwide.

The album is certified Gold by the Record Industry Association of America for over 500,000 copies sold in the US.

== Critical reception ==
Professional ratings
Aggregate scores
Source	Rating
Metacritic	90/100
Review scores
Source	Rating
AllMusic	5/5 stars
Blender	5/5 stars
Entertainment Weekly	B+
The Guardian	5/5 stars
Mojo	4/5 stars
NME	9/10
Pitchfork	9.7/10
Q	4/5 stars
Rolling Stone	4/5 stars
The Village Voice	A−

Funeral received universal acclaim from music critics and is considered by many to be a modern classic. At Metacritic, the album has received an average score of 90, based on 33 reviews. It is put at one of the top 100 albums on Metacritic's list of highest scored albums of all time. AllMusic reviewer James Christopher Monger gave the album a rating of five stars out of five. He described it as "brave, empowering, and dusted with something that many of the indie-rock genre's more contrived acts desperately lack: an element of real danger." Rock critic Robert Christgau gave the album an A−, saying that Funeral was "...too fond of drama, but aware of its small place in the big world, and usually beautiful." Pitchfork gave the album a 9.7 out of 10 rating, and ultimately ranked the album #1 on their Top 50 Albums of 2004 list, as well as #2 on their Top 200 Albums of the 2000s list, after Radiohead's Kid A. Kludge called it a "glorious" debut album, in which Arcade Fire spins "elaborate art-rock full of passion and atmosphere."

Drowned in Sound also highly praised Funeral. Reviewer Jesus Chigley called the album "...empowering and hopeful and euphoric all at once", saying that "it says everything there is to say about mortality and it does it in 10 tracks." Stylus's Josh Drimmer gave Funeral an A, calling it "celebratory, emotionally rich and life-affirming". Tiny Mix Tapes gave the album five stars out of five; "Funeral," the reviewer wrote, "is like nothing you've heard before, and altogether familiar." Reviewing the album in February 2005, Dave Simpson of The Guardian called it "one of the year's best already, by a mile." Zeth Lundy of PopMatters complimented Funeral on its eccentricity, calling it "bizarre at turns and recognizable elsewhere, equally beautiful and harrowing, theatrical and sincere, defying categorization while attempting to create new genres." Entertainment Weekly put it on its end-of-the-decade "best-of" list, saying, "Funerals are generally somber affairs, but the Canadian indie rockers' emotionally charged 2004 debut mostly just made us smile. And, okay, mist up a little." In 2017, Canadian music magazine Exclaim! ranked fifth single "Wake Up" as the best song in the band's entire catalogue.

The album was also listed in the book 1001 Albums You Must Hear Before You Die.

=== Impact and legacy ===
"A game-changing debut", Funeral has been designated as "one of the most triumphant rock records" of all time. Stereogum ranked it as "arguably the most influential indie-rock album" of its time, while Guitar.com saw it house "some of the most deliriously euphoric anthems" of the 2000s.

Pitchfork's Stuart Berman saw Funeral change Arcade Fire into "instant indie-rock icons", helping the genre shift from "a fringe movement born of economic circumstance" to "an aspirational career model". Stereogum's Chris DeVille dubbed it "a how-to guide for grand, artful, [and] cathartic rock music" that turned out "impossible to replicate". He credited it with birthing future indie rock characteristics including "sing-songy" choral work, orchestral instrumentation, and more. He also saw the album popularize arena rock's grandeur in the genre, replacing the "ironic detachment" of fellow indie group Pavement.

=== Accolades ===
Accolades for Funeral
Publication	Country	Accolade	Year	Rank
Consequence	US	The Top 100 Albums of the 2000s	2009	2
LAS Magazine	US	Albums of the decade	2009	1
Mojo	UK	The 100 Greatest Albums of Our Lifetime 1993-2006	2006	60
NME	UK	The 100 Greatest Albums of the 2000s	2009	7
Paste	US	The 50 Best Albums of the 2000s	2009	3
Pitchfork	US	Top 200 Albums of the 2000s	2009	2
Pitchfork	US	The 100 Best Indie Rock Albums of All Time	2026	19
Rolling Stone	US	Top 100 Albums of the 2000s	2009	6
Rolling Stone	US	500 Greatest Albums of All Time	2020	500
Rolling Stone	US	100 Best Debut Albums of All Time	2013	15
Slant Magazine	US	Top 250 Albums of the 2000s	2010	4
Spin	US	125 Best Albums of the Past 25 Years	2010	66
Under the Radar	US	Top 200 Albums of the Decade	2009	1
Q	UK	250 Best Albums of Q's Lifetime	2011	19
NME	UK	The 500 Greatest Albums of the All Time	2013	13
CBC Music	Canada	100 Greatest Canadian Albums of the All Time	2013	4
PopMatters	US	100 Best Albums of the 2000s	2014	3

== Track listing ==
All tracks are written by Arcade Fire (Will Butler, Win Butler, Régine Chassagne, Tim Kingsbury, Richard Reed Parry), unless otherwise noted. Writing credits retrieved from ASCAP.

Funeral
No.	Title	Writer(s)	Lead vocals	Length
1.	"Neighborhood #1 (Tunnels)"	Will Butler; Win Butler; Chassagne; Joshua Deu; Kingsbury; Parry	Win Butler	4:48
2.	"Neighborhood #2 (Laïka)"		Butler, Chassagne	3:33
3.	"Une année sans lumière"		Butler, Chassagne	3:40
4.	"Neighborhood #3 (Power Out)"	Will Butler; Win Butler; Chassagne; Deu; Kingsbury; Parry	Butler	5:12
5.	"Neighborhood #4 (7 Kettles)"		Butler	4:49
6.	"Crown of Love"		Butler	4:42
7.	"Wake Up"		Butler, Chassagne	5:39
8.	"Haiti"		Chassagne	4:07
9.	"Rebellion (Lies)"	Howard Bilerman; Win Butler; Chassagne; Kingsbury; Parry	Butler	5:10
10.	"In the Backseat"		Chassagne	6:21

Japanese CD edition bonus tracks
No.	Title	Writer(s)	Length
1.	"My Buddy" (Alvino Rey Orchestra)		2:35
2.	"Neighborhood #3 (Power Out)" (August Session)	Arcade Fire	5:35
3.	"Brazil" (Ary Barroso cover)	Ary Barroso	3:56
4.	"Neighborhood #3 (Power Out)" (Live at the Great American Music Hall)	Arcade Fire	5:57

== Personnel ==
Credits adapted from the liner notes of Funeral.

Arcade Fire

- Arcade Fire – production, string arrangements, engineering, recording
- Win Butler – vocals, 6 and 12 string electric guitars, acoustic guitar, piano, synthesizer, bass
- Régine Chassagne – vocals, drums, synthesizer, piano, accordion, xylophone, recorders, percussion
- Richard Reed Parry – electric guitar, synthesizer, organ, piano, accordion, xylophone, percussion, double bass, engineering, recording
- Tim Kingsbury – bass, electric guitar, acoustic guitar
- Howard Bilerman – drums, guitar, engineer, recording
- William Butler – bass, xylophone, synthesizer, percussion

Additional musicians

- Sarah Neufeld – violin, string arrangements
- Owen Pallett – violin, string arrangements
- Michael Olsen – cello
- Pietro Amato – horn
- Anita Fust – harp
- Sophie Trudeau – violin (track 7)
- Jessica Moss – violin (track 7)
- Gen Heistek – viola (track 7)
- Arlen Thompson – drums (track 7)

Technical personnel

- Mark Lawson – engineering, recording
- Thierry Amar – recording assistance
- Ryan Morey – mastering
- Hilary Treadwell – photography, artwork
- Tracy Maurice – cover art

== Charts ==
=== Weekly charts ===
Chart (2005–06,2021)	Peak position
Australian Albums Chart	80
Belgian Albums Chart (Flanders)	59
Canadian Albums Chart	23
Dutch Albums Chart	42
French Albums Chart	61
German Albums Chart	96
Irish Albums Chart	16
Norwegian Albums Chart	27
Portuguese Albums Chart	16
UK Albums Chart (OCC)	33
US Billboard 200	123

== Certifications ==
Region	Certification	Certified units/sales
Canada (Music Canada)	2× Platinum	200,000^{‡}
France	—	53,700
United Kingdom (BPI)	Platinum	374,430
United States (RIAA)	Gold	504,000
Summaries
Worldwide	—	1,000,000
^{‡} Sales+streaming figures based on certification alone.

== See also ==
- Album era
