= Kepler (band) =

- Origin: Ottawa, Ontario, Canada
- Genres: Indie rock, slowcore
- Years active: 1997–2006
- Labels: Spectrasonicsound, Troubleman Unlimited, Resonant, Plenge
- Past members: Jeremy Gara; Samir Khan; Jon Georgekish-Watt; Mike Sheridan; Michael Feuerstack; Mike Dubue; Jordy Walker

Kepler was a Canadian indie rock band which initially was known for its exceptionally slow and quiet sound.

== History ==
Kepler was formed in 1997 by Samir Khan and Jon Georgekish-Watt in Ottawa. The band initially included Jeremy Gara and Mike Sheridan, and over time a variety of guest musicians.

Kepler released a slowcore album, Fuck Fight Fail, was released in 2000. 2002's Missionless Days included a more country flavour.

The band toured across Canada, the United States, and Europe, opening for Montreal's Godspeed You! Black Emperor in the United Kingdom and The Netherlands.

Sheridan left the band before the recording of the band's album, Attic Salt. During the recording of the album, drummer, guitarist and keyboardist Jeremy Gara left to join Arcade Fire. Guest musicians Michael Feuerstack, Jordy Walker and Mike Dubue contributed to the album.

To support Attic Salt, the new lineup of Khan, Georgekish-Watt, Feuerstak, Walker, and Dubue played a few shows around the release of the album. Kepler disbanded in early 2006.

Attic Salt was released on vinyl for the first time by German label oscarson on May 6, 2014.

== Members ==
=== Former ===
- Mike Dubue
- Michael Feuerstack
- Jeremy Gara
- Jon Georgekish-Watt
- Samir Khan
- Mike Sheridan
- Jordy Walker

== Discography ==
- Kepler (Demo) (1997)
- Between Still Sheets/Can You Steer By Mars? 7" (Spectrasonicsound) (1999)
- This Heart is Painted On (Spectrasonicsound) (1999)
- Fuck Fight Fail (Troubleman Unlimited) (2000)
- Dogwatcher/Waterfall 7" (Resonant) (2002)
- Missionless Days CD (Troubleman Unlimited/ Resonant), LP (Plenge Records) (2002)
- Attic Salt (Troubleman Unlimited/ Resonant) (2005)

== See also ==
- Music of Canada
- Canadian rock
- List of Canadian musicians
- List of bands from Canada
- Category:Canadian musical groups
