= CLARK the band =

Canadian indie rock band

- Also known as: Clark
- Origin: Ottawa, Ontario, Canada
- Genre: Indie rock
- Years active: 1999–2007
- Label: Zunior Records
- Past members: John Tielli; Matt Gagnon; Mike Dubue; Philip Shaw Bova; Andrew McCormack; Vish Khanna; Jeremy Gara; Tim Kingsbury; Robin Buckley; Dan Neill; Ryan Myshrall; Jordy Walker; Corwin Fox

CLARK the band was a Canadian indie rock band operating out of Ottawa, Ontario, Canada.

== History ==
The band was formed in Ottawa in 1999 by John Tielli who sang, played guitar and composed. Initially named simply "Clark", the group began using the name "CLARK the band" to differentiate themselves from other similarly named bands.

The group's roster changed throughout its existence; Tielli was the only consistent member. Primary members also included Matt Gagnon on bass and vocals, Mike Dubue on keyboards and vocals, Philip Shaw Bova on drums, Andrew McCormack on drums, Jeremy Gara on drums, Tim Kingsbury on bass and vocals, Vish Khanna on drums, Robin Buckley on drums, Dan Neill on drums, vocals and keyboards, Ryan Myshrall on bass, Jordy Walker on drums and Corwin Fox on bass and vocals.

In 2000, the band released a three-song EP titled Clark.

In 2001, the group release its full-length debut, Terra Incognito: By Land, Sea and Air. It received positive reviews from the Ottawa Citizen, Eye Weekly, and CBC Radio's Bandwidth. Reviewer Kevin Jagernauth called Clark's combination of rock with eighties keyboard pop refreshing.

The album The Woods, released in 2005, combined Tielli's distinctive vocal style with pop and rock metal instrumentation.

The group disbanded in 2007. Tielli has since moved to Toronto and formed the group Metal Kites.

== Discography ==
Year	Album	Label
2000	Clark	Independent Release
2001	Terra Incognita - By Land, Sea and Air	Independent Release
2005	The Woods	Zunior

== See also ==
- Music of Canada
- Canadian rock
- List of bands from Canada
- List of Canadian musicians
- Category:Canadian musical groups
