= Rebellion (Lies) =

- Cover of the CD single

Single by Arcade Fire

from the album Funeral
- B-side: Live version; "Brazil"
- Released: September 12, 2005
- Recorded: August 2003 – early 2004
- Studio: Hotel2Tango (Montreal, Quebec)
- Genre: Indie rock; arena rock; power pop; baroque pop
- Length: 5:05
- Label: Rough Trade
- Songwriters: Howard Bilerman; Win Butler; Régine Chassagne; Tim Kingsbury; Richard Reed Parry
- Producer: Arcade Fire

Arcade Fire singles chronology
"Cold Wind" (2005)	"Rebellion (Lies)" (2005)	"Wake Up" (2005)

Alternative cover
- Cover of the DVD single

"Rebellion (Lies)" is a song by Canadian indie rock band Arcade Fire. It was the fourth single released from the band's debut album, Funeral. The single was released in both CD and DVD formats with the song "Brazil" as the B-side. The single peaked at number 19 on the UK singles chart, the band's best performance on this chart to date. On the album Funeral, "Rebellion (Lies)" immediately follows the song "Haiti", the ending of which has the same bass beat and leads right into the beginning of "Rebellion (Lies)". The song has enduringly been the band's closing song at appearances at music festivals and at the end of most of their shows, and as of July 2025 is their most-performed song live. In October 2011, British pop singer Sophie Ellis-Bextor released a cover in support of Songs to Save a Life, a benefit project in aid of Samaritans.

== Accolades ==
The song was one of three tracks mentioned in the band's nomination — and win — of the 2006 Juno Award for Songwriter of the Year. The song was also nominated for Best Independent Video at the 2005 MuchMusic Video Awards.

In May 2007, NME magazine named the song as #29 in its list of the "50 Greatest Indie Anthems Ever". In April 2009, the song was featured in Blender magazine's "500 Greatest Songs Since You Were Born" as #380. In August 2009, the song was ranked #69 in Pitchfork Media's Top 500 Tracks of the 2000s. In 2009, NME ranked the song as the 9th best of the 2000s and in October 2011 they named it as 2nd in their list of the 150 greatest songs from the past 15 years.

== Appearances ==
The song was featured on a season 5 episode of the television series Six Feet Under.

This song was originally intended to be used during the closing scene of the pilot for the television series The Black Donnellys, but the band refused to grant the rights for its use. Snow Patrol's "Open Your Eyes" was used instead.

In 2006, the song was featured in a commercial promoting Bono's Product Red campaign.

Since 2008, the song has been used as opening theme for the Italian talk show Otto e mezzo on La7 network.

In 2011, filmmaker Matthew Wisniewski set his footage of the Wisconsin Uprising to the song.

== Track listing ==
1. "Rebellion (Lies)" – 5:05
2. "Brazil" – 3:54

== Personnel ==
- Win Butler - vocals, Jaguar electric guitar
- Régine Chassagne - piano, backing vocals
- Richard Reed Parry - Rickenbacker electric guitar, backing vocals, engineer, recording
- Tim Kingsbury - bass, backing vocals
- Howard Bilerman - drums, engineer, recording
- Will Butler - percussion, backing vocals

Additional musicians

- Sarah Neufeld – violin, string arrangements
- Owen Pallett – violin, string arrangements
- Michael Olsen – cello
- Pietro Amato – horn
- Anita Fust – harp

== Charts ==
Chart (2005)	Peak position
Canada Hot AC Top 30 (Radio & Records)	19
UK Singles (OCC)	19
UK Indie (OCC)	1

== Certifications ==
Region	Certification	Certified units/sales
Canada (Music Canada)	Platinum	80,000^{‡}
^{‡} Sales+streaming figures based on certification alone.
