= Neighborhood 2 (Laïka) =

2005 single by Arcade Fire

"Neighborhood #2 (Laïka)"

Single by Arcade Fire

from the album Funeral
- B-side: "My Buddy"
- Released: March 28, 2005
- Recorded: August 2003 – early 2004
- Studio: Hotel2Tango (Montreal, Quebec)
- Genre: Indie rock; chamber pop; art rock; post-punk revival
- Length: 3:29
- Label: Rough Trade
- Songwriters: Will Butler; Win Butler; Régine Chassagne; Tim Kingsbury; Richard Reed Parry
- Producer: Arcade Fire

Arcade Fire singles chronology
"Neighborhood #1 (Tunnels)" (2004)	"Neighborhood #2 (Laïka)" (2005)	"Neighborhood #3 (Power Out)" (2005)

"Neighborhood #2 (Laïka)" is the second single by Canadian rock band Arcade Fire from their debut album Funeral. Released on 28 March 2005, the single reached number 30 on the UK Singles Chart, and was released on the Rough Trade Records record label. The single also contains the song "My Buddy" by Alvino Rey, the grandfather of Arcade Fire members Win and William Butler, which was previously featured on the band's debut single "Neighborhood #1 (Tunnels)".

When the song is performed at live shows, band members Will Butler and Richard Reed Parry usually take on percussion duties, often engaging in eccentric and sometimes violent acts while the rest of the band continue to perform.

== Interpretation ==
The song, the second track on Funeral, is (according to Win Butler) about the Russian space program sending the dog Laika into space. Laika was the first living creature to orbit Earth. Butler told Pulse, a Minneapolis publication, "It’s a great story about a dog being the first living creature in space. Doing this spectacular thing, but not having food and watching itself fall back into the earth."

The song's dark lyrics complement its catchy melodies. The lyrics first tell the story of "Alexander", thought to be inspired by Chris McCandless, a nomad who went by the pseudonym "Alexander Supertramp", being sent out on an adventure. The adventure, for the "good of the neighborhood", will ultimately end in the death of "Alexander".

== Track listings ==
- "Neighborhood #2 (Laïka)" - 3:29
- "My Buddy" (Alvino Rey Orchestra, live radio broadcast, 1940) - 2:32

== Personnel ==
- Win Butler - vocals, Jaguar Electric Guitar
- Regine Chassagne - Vocals, accordion
- Richard Reed Parry - percussion, synthesizer, engineer, recording
- Tim Kingsbury - bass
- Howard Bilerman - drums, Engineer, Recording
- Will Butler - Percussion, xylophone

Additional musicians

- Sarah Neufeld – violin, string arrangements
- Owen Pallett – violin, string arrangements
- Michael Olsen – cello
- Pietro Amato – horn
- Anita Fust – harp
