= Friday Night (album) =

Live album by Will Butler
- Released: June 17, 2016
- Genre: Indie rock
- Length: 51:00
- Label: Merge

Will Butler chronology
Policy (2015)	Friday Night (2016)

Friday Night is a solo live album by American musician Will Butler, who is also a member of Arcade Fire. It contains live versions of many songs from his debut album Policy as well as five new songs and two of the songs that he recorded for The Guardian in a one-week song-a-day project. The album was released on June 17, 2016 by Merge Records.

== Recording and concept ==
Most of the songs for Friday Night were recorded at Lincoln Hall in Chicago on June 4, 2015.

The second track "Introduction" features the voice of comedian Jo Firestone. This played into Butler's press release for the album, saying to "Think of this as a comedy record" because of the comedian's presence, but also because "it’s an album based on working out ideas in a room full of people, playing off their energy and expectations. It’s about taking complicated emotions and wringing communal joy from them, and then translating that joy onto record".

The artwork was designed by Broad City star Abbi Jacobson.

== Critical reception ==
Professional ratings
Review scores
Source	Rating
Exclaim!	7/10

Writing for Exclaim!, Matt Bobkin praised the album's "weird and ramshackle" feel.

== Track listing ==
All tracks are written by Will Butler.

No.	Title	Length
1.	"Encore – Tell Me We’re Alright"	6:46
2.	"Introduction"	3:28
3.	"You Must Be Kidding"	3:28
4.	"Son of God"	2:52
5.	"Sun Comes Up"	5:13
6.	"Madonna Can't Save Me Now"	4:30
7.	"Something's Coming"	3:08
8.	"Anna"	3:43
9.	"II"	1:57
10.	"Sing to Me"	3:27
11.	"Public Defender"	2:40
12.	"Take My Side"	4:46
13.	"Encore – Friday Night"	7:38

== Personnel ==
- Will Butler – guitar, vocals, keyboard
- Miles Arntzen – drums, backup vocals
- Julie Shore – synth bass, backup vocals
- Sara Dobbs – synth lead, synth pad backup vocals
