= Wake Up (Arcade Fire song) =

Single by Arcade Fire

from the album Funeral
- Released: November 14, 2005
- Recorded: 2003–2004
- Studio: Hotel2Tango (Montreal, Quebec)
- Genre: Indie rock; chamber pop; art rock
- Length: 5:33 (album version); 3:45 (radio edit)
- Label: Rough Trade
- Songwriters: Will Butler; Win Butler; Régine Chassagne; Tim Kingsbury; Richard Reed Parry
- Producer: Arcade Fire

Arcade Fire singles chronology
"Rebellion (Lies)" (2005)	"Wake Up" (2005)	"Black Mirror" (2007)

"Wake Up" is an indie rock song by Canadian rock band Arcade Fire. It was the fifth and final single released from the band's debut album, Funeral. The single was released as a one-sided 7-inch vinyl record on November 14, 2005.

== Reception and legacy ==
In 2009, NME ranked "Wake Up" as the 25th best song of the decade, and in 2014 ranked "Wake Up" as the 25th greatest song of all-time. In June 2011, Rolling Stone ranked "Wake Up" as the 42nd best song of the 2000s. In October 2011, NME placed it at number 22 on its list "150 Best Tracks of the Past 15 Years".

In 2014, Pitchfork described the chorus of "Wake Up" as "one of the most thrilling, bracing moments in recent rock history", placing it in a tradition of anthemic classic rock wordless crescendos including "Born to Run", "Biko", and "Hey Jude". Pitchfork credited the chorus with inspiring "the most ubiquitous vocal device in contemporary rock": "a relentless procession of 'woah-oh-oh-ohs!' and 'ho yeahs!' and 'heys!' and songs filled with so many 'hos!' and 'heys!', that there's no choice but to give them titles like 'Ho Hey.'" The trend drove the popularity of "indie-oriented big-ticket music festivals" where acts could initiate engagement with larger crowds through "non-lyrical, group-chorus peer pressure."

As of June 2024, "Wake Up" holds the number 86 spot on Rate Your Music's Top Singles of the 2000s.

== In popular culture ==
A live version of the song performed with David Bowie at Fashion Rocks appears on the 2005 Live EP (Live at Fashion Rocks).

This song was played during the beginning of the U2's Vertigo Tour shows, usually followed by "City of Blinding Lights". A brief snippet of the song's pre-concert appearance opens U2's concert film Vertigo 2005: Live from Chicago.

"Wake Up" was played as the pre-game intro song at New York Rangers games during the 2006–2007 season. It is currently used as the intro song for Premier League clubs Burnley and Aston Villa and, since 2005, by Irish Premier League champions Linfield.

A new version of the song was recorded for and featured in the trailer for the 2009 film Where the Wild Things Are.

"Wake Up" is part of the soundtrack for The Secret Life of Walter Mitty (2013 film).

Arcade Fire licensed "Wake Up" to play in commercials during Super Bowl XLIV. All proceeds from airing the song were donated to Partners in Health for relief efforts related to the 2010 Haiti earthquake.

== Track listing ==
1. "Wake Up" - 5:33

== Personnel ==
- Win Butler - vocals, 12 string electric guitar
- Regine Chassagne - vocals, synthesizer
- Richard Reed Parry - percussion, accordion, piano, backing vocals, engineer, recording
- Tim Kingsbury - electric guitar, backing vocals
- Howard Bilerman - engineer, recording
- Arlen Thompson - drums
- Will Butler - bass, backing vocals

Additional musicians

- Sarah Neufeld – violin, string arrangements
- Owen Pallett – violin, string arrangements
- Michael Olsen – cello
- Pietro Amato – horn
- Anita Fust – harp
- Sophie Trudeau – violin
- Jessica Moss – violin
- Gen Heistek – viola

== Charts ==
Chart (2005)	Peak position
Canada Rock Top 30 (Radio & Records)	25
UK Singles (Official Charts)	29

== Certifications ==
Region	Certification	Certified units/sales
Canada (Music Canada)	Platinum	80,000^{‡}
Portugal (AFP)	Gold	10,000^{‡}
^{‡} Sales+streaming figures based on certification alone.
