= Neighborhood 1 (Tunnels) =

2004 single by Arcade Fire

"Neighborhood #1 (Tunnels)"

Single by Arcade Fire

from the album Funeral
- B-side: "My Buddy"
- Released: June 20, 2004
- Recorded: August 2003 – early 2004
- Studio: Hotel2Tango (Montreal, Quebec)
- Genre: Indie rock; alternative rock
- Length: 4:48
- Label: Merge
- Songwriters: Will Butler; Win Butler; Régine Chassagne; Josh Deu; Tim Kingsbury; Richard Reed Parry
- Producer: Arcade Fire

Arcade Fire singles chronology
"Neighborhood #1 (Tunnels)" (2004)	"Neighborhood #2 (Laïka)" (2005)

"Neighborhood #1 (Tunnels)" is a song by Canadian rock band Arcade Fire, and the first track on their debut album Funeral. It is the first of the four-part "Neighborhood" series found on Funeral. It was the band's first single, released several months before the album as a 7" vinyl record on June 20, 2004, to a pressing of 1500 copies. The B-side of the single is a recording of the song "My Buddy" by swing musician Alvino Rey. Rey is the maternal grandfather of Arcade Fire members Win and William Butler.

Arcade Fire re-issued the single on November 29, 2019 as part of Record Store Day's Black Friday event. The song was covered by the musician Ane Brun for her deluxe version of her album It All Starts With One in 2012.

== Background and composition ==
According to Win Butler of the band, the guitar part was accidentally recorded with a microphone meant for vocals on the other side of the recording room instead of the intended guitar microphone. This take was kept on the final version. Critics described the song as "a sumptuously theatrical opener" with strings, an organ and a piano. The lyrics describe "grieving against a town buried in snow", with a young man who escapes his neighborhood to meet his girlfriend in the town square to plan their future as grown-ups.

== Critical reception ==
The Arcade Fire "Neighborhood #1 (Tunnels)" (2004)
30 second sample from Arcade Fire's first track off of Funeral.

In August 2009, the song was named #10 on Pitchfork's "Top 500 Tracks of the 2000s". In a 2012 Beats Per Minute article on The Essential Arcade Fire, it was named the band's most essential track by writer Lucien Flores. Flores writes, "'Tunnels' has all the elements of a great Arcade Fire song: a head-bobbing rhythm section, lyrics that harken back to an imperfect past, a seamless blend of instruments, and a cathartic coda."

== Track listing ==
7" single

1. "Neighborhood #1 (Tunnels)" - 4:48
2. "My Buddy" (Alvino Rey Orchestra, live radio broadcast, 1940) - 2:32

== Personnel ==
=== Arcade Fire ===
- Win Butler - vocals, electric guitar
- Regine Chassagne - backing vocals, drums
- Richard Reed Parry - piano, backing vocals, organ, engineer, recording
- Tim Kingsbury - bass, backing vocals
- Howard Bilerman - electric guitar, engineer, recording
- Will Butler - percussion, backing vocals

Additional musicians

- Sarah Neufeld – violin, string arrangements
- Owen Pallett – violin, string arrangements
- Michael Olsen – cello
- Pietro Amato – horn
- Anita Fust – harp
