= Neighbor (company) =

Neighbor Storage, Inc.
- Company type: Private
- Industry: Self storage
- Founded: 2017
- Founders: Preston Alder; Colton Gardner; Joseph Woodbury
- Area served: United States
- Website: neighbor.com

Neighbor is an American company that provides an online marketplace for peer-to-peer and traditional self storage.

== History ==
Founded in March 2017 by Preston Alder, Colton Gardner, and Joseph Woodbury, the company's seed round of funding was led by venture capital firms Album VC (formerly Peak Ventures) and Pelion Ventures. In March 2018, Neighbor changed the spelling of their name from Neiybor, under which it had operated since the company's inception, to the current name.

== Recognition ==
In February 2018, the Utah Governor's Office honored Neighbor with the Technology Commercialization and Innovation Award. The startup received several awards from the Lassonde Institute at the University of Utah and the Rollins Center for Entrepreneurship & Technology at Brigham Young University before announcing $2.5 Million in funding in March 2018. In March 2018, Neighbor was named a finalist in the Consumer Software category of the Utah Innovation Awards.

In November 2018, Eric Schmidt's American Dream Ideas challenge named Neighbor a Top 3 Finalist in companies improving middle-class income.
