= Neighborhood 3 (Power Out) =

2005 single by Arcade Fire

"Neighborhood #3 (Power Out)"

Single by Arcade Fire

from the album Funeral
- B-side: "This Must Be the Place (Naive Melody)" (Live)
- Released: May 22, 2005
- Recorded: 2003–2004
- Studio: Hotel2Tango (Montreal, Quebec)
- Genre: Indie rock; post-punk revival; art rock
- Length: 5:08
- Label: Rough Trade
- Songwriter(s): Will Butler; Win Butler; Régine Chassagne; Josh Deu; Tim Kingsbury; Richard Reed Parry
- Producer(s): Arcade Fire

Arcade Fire singles chronology
"Neighborhood #2 (Laïka)" (2005)	"Neighborhood #3 (Power Out)" (2005)	"Cold Wind" (2005)

Alternate cover art

"Neighborhood #3 (Power Out)" is an indie rock song by Canadian rock band Arcade Fire. It was the third single released from the band's debut album, Funeral.

The single was released in 2005, on the Rough Trade Records label. The single peaked at #26 on the UK Singles Chart, and it remained on the chart for two weeks. Arcade Fire won the 2006 Juno Award for "Songwriter of the Year" for "Neighborhood #3 (Power Out)", along with two other tracks from Funeral, and the song's music video was nominated "Video of the Year".

== Background ==
The lyrics were written by Butler and Chassagne along with former band member Deu and inspired by the North American ice storm of 1998 in Montreal, which left the city in a blackout for over a week.

The lyrics are mostly metaphorical and ambiguous, which has led to speculation as to what message they convey. The lyrics are dark ("Kids are dying out in the snow") and have a theme of hopelessness ("Don't have any dreams / Don't have any plans"). Butler acknowledges that the two used the outage "as a basis to start from, to talk about other stuff", and so there are many ideas addressed in the song.

Despite the pessimistic atmosphere, Butler has indicated that there are "two sides" to the lyrics, and it can be interpreted as "uplifting", noting the lyrics "And the power's out / In the heart of man / Take it from your heart / Put it in your hand." Says Butler: "If there's something fucked up in your heart, you're going to put it in your hand as a sword."

The lyrics also refer to Butler's idea that it is impossible to completely hide one's secrets. "A lot of people have [the idea] that there are aspects of your life that are hidden or secret … But I think that people are pretty much open book." He adds that the song can be interpreted politically, as current political figures have been accused of acting with hidden motives.

== Video ==
An animated music video was produced for "Neighborhood #3 (Power Out)" by Plates Animation, who also produced the animated video for The Shins' "So Says I". The video depicts several youths wearing hooded jackets cutting the power lines to a snowy 1920s steampunk city, while several old men chase them.

== Track listings ==
=== CD single (UK) ===
1. "Neighborhood #3 (Power Out)" (album version)
2. "Neighborhood #3 (Power Out)" (August Session)

=== Clear vinyl 7″ (UK) ===
1. "Neighborhood #3 (Power Out)" (album version)
2. "Neighborhood #3 (Power Out)" (August Session)

=== Black 7″ (UK) ===
1. "Neighborhood #3 (Power Out)" (live from the Great American Music Hall in San Francisco)
2. "This Must Be the Place (Naive Melody)" (featuring David Byrne, live from Irving Plaza in New York City)

== Personnel ==
Arcade Fire

- Win Butler - vocals, Jaguar Electric Guitar
- Regine Chassagne - synthesizer, background vocals
- Richard Reed Parry - Rickenbacker guitar, background vocals, engineer, recording
- Tim Kingsbury - bass, background vocals
- Howard Bilerman - drums, engineer, recording
- Will Butler - xylophone, background vocals

Additional musicians

- Sarah Neufeld – violin, string arrangements
- Owen Pallett – violin, string arrangements
- Michael Olsen – cello
- Pietro Amato – horn
- Anita Fust – harp

== Charts ==
Chart (2005)	Peak position
Canada Rock Top 30 (Radio & Records)	26
UK Singles (OCC)	26
