= Neighbourhood (TV series) =

- Starring: Frederick Lee; Danielle Dai; Leslie Chai; Angie Seow; Mayjune Tan
- Country of origin: Malaysia
- Original language: Mandarin

Production
- Running time: 60 minutes (approx.)

Original release
- Network: ntv7
- Release: November 2010 – 2011

Related
- Injustice

Neighbourhood is a Chinese drama series which is co-produce by mm2 Entertainment and ntv7. It will be aired every Monday to Thursday, at 10:00pm on Malaysia's ntv7 in 2010.

== Cast ==
- Frederick Lee
- Danielle Dai
- Leslie Chai
- Angie Seow
- Mayjune Tan
