= Diealright =

South Korean punk band

DIEALRIGHT
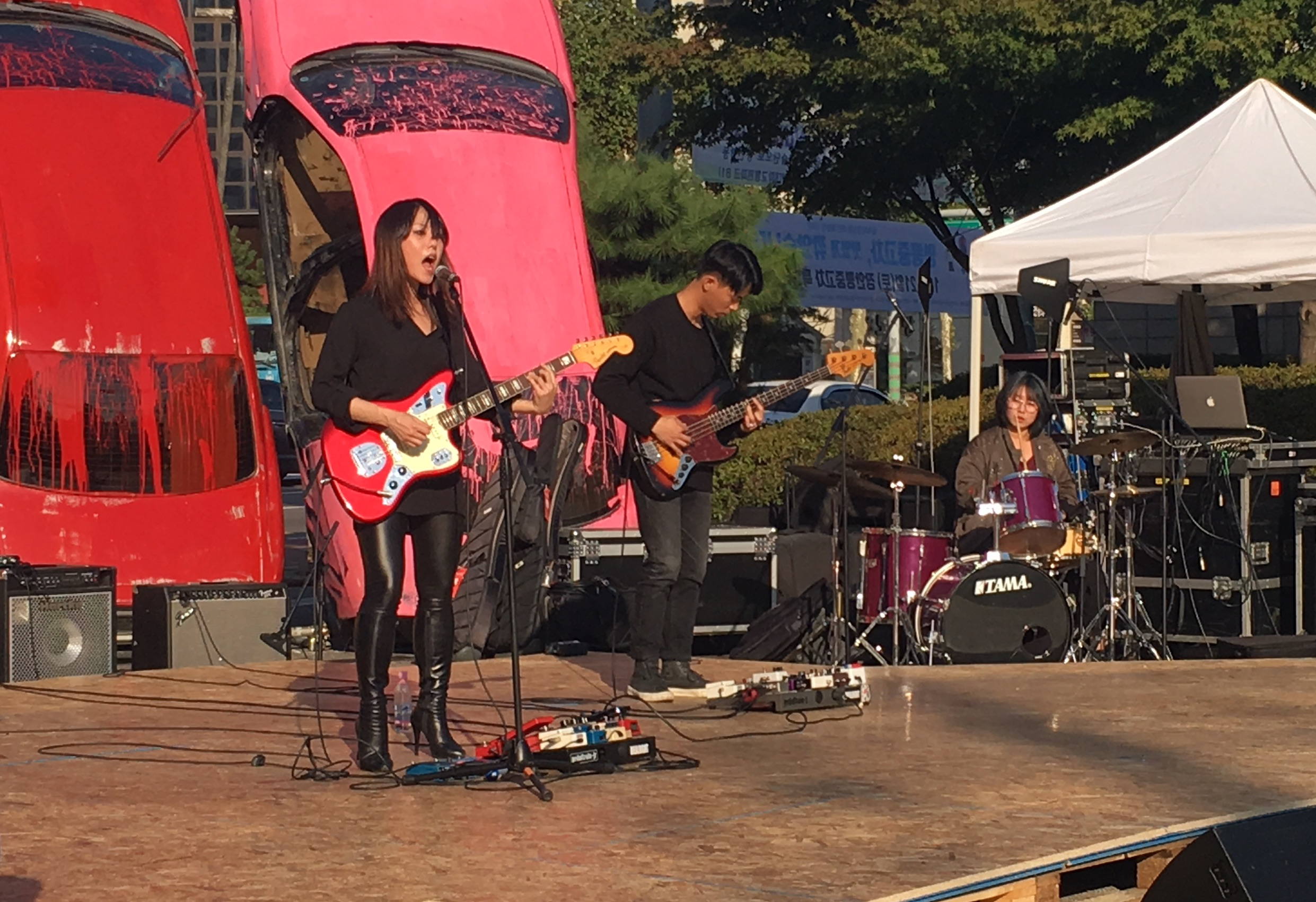

Background information
- Origin: Seoul, South Korea
- Genres: Post punk, alternative rock
- Years active: 2014–present
- Members: Chae Song Hwa; Kim Seung Il; Baek Soojung (Former)
- Website: www.facebook.com/diealright/

Diealright (Korean: 다이얼라잇), often stylized as DIEALRIGHT, is a post punk band from Seoul, Korea. Consisting of lead vocalist and guitarist Chae Song Hwa, bass guitarist Kim Seung Il, and drummer Baek Soojung, the band debuted in 2014. Since then, they have released two singles, and EP and an album. The album presentation showcase was held in Club Freebird in Hongdae. The band played their first European tour dates in the summer of 2017.

Singer Chae was previously in Midnight Smokin' Drive and the all-female punk rock band Rule Destroyer.

== Band members ==
- Chae Song Hwa: lead vocals, guitar, keyboards
- Kim Seung Il: bass guitar, guitar, backing vocals
- Baek Soojung: drums, backing vocals (2014-2017)

== Discography ==
=== Albums ===
Date	Title	Track listing
November 2017	Minor World	1. Heaven; 2. Johnny; 3. Satellite; 4. Hunt; 5. U.R.A; 6. Hello; 7. Garden; 8. When We; 9. F-; 10. On the Road

=== EPs ===
Released	Title	Track listing
September 2014	Satellite	1. Hello; 2. Do Not Eat; 3. Heaven; 4. Satellite

=== Singles ===
Released	Title	Track listing
December 2015	Garden	1. Garden
March 2015	Mad Queen	1. Mad Queen; 2. Hunt
May 2019	I Will Thank You If You Shut Up	1. I Will Thank You If You Shut Up

== Notable festivals ==
- Zandari Festa 2017, 2016, 2015
- Primavera Sound 2017
- Liverpool Sound City 2017
