= Neighbors Expedition =

The Neighbors Expedition, led by Robert Neighbors was one of several expeditions sent by the military to explore the area between San Antonio and El Paso with the purpose of opening a practical road to the west, which could be used by settlers and stages. The Neighbors Expedition, along with that led by Col. John C. Hays of the Texas Rangers in 1848, and that of Lieutenants William Henry Chase Whiting and William F. Smith of the United States Army Corps of Engineers in 1849, were the most important of these expeditions.

Of all these expeditions, the one which mapped the route ultimately taken by the stage and most travelers from mid-Texas to El Paso was the route selected and mapped by Robert Neighbors. Indeed, the highway from Austin to El Paso today exactly mirrors the route taken and recommended by Neighbors to the American Military.

== Background ==
Neighbors had been an officer in the Army of the Republic of Texas from 1839 to 1844. In 1842 he was one of a number of Texas officers and officials, (court and government officials) taken prisoner by Mexican general Adrián Woll at San Antonio during Woll's invasion of Texas in 1842. Taken to Mexico and imprisoned along with dozens of other Texas Government officers and officials, Neighbors was subsequently released in 1844, after negotiations between the Republic of Texas, the United States, and Mexico. Neighbors then became the Indian agent of Texas, supervising the Republic's, and then the United States, agreements with the Lipan Apache, Tonkawa, and Comanche Indians.

Neighbors, who invented the "field system" of Indian Supervision, was one of the few white men who was familiar with the Comancheria, the homeland of the Comanche, and more importantly, could safely travel there. He spoke the language, understood and respected their culture, and was respected by their Chiefs, including the powerful Buffalo Hump.

== Expedition to El Paso ==
Because of his reputation as a scout, and his reputation for being respected by the Comanche, Major General William J. Worth, the Commander of the United States Army's Eighth Military District, which included Texas, selected him to lead an expedition to find a road to El Paso which both settlers and wagon trains carrying commercial loads could use. Neighbors led a combined military-Ranger force that included his personal friend John Salmon Ford. The party left San Antonio, passed through the state capital at Austin, and finalized its preparations at the Torrey Trading House near what is now Waco, Texas. In addition to Rip Ford, Neighbors selected three other white men, D. C. Sullivan, A. D. Neal, and James Shaw (a celebrated part-Delaware scout and interpreter, and a man with a reputation for being able to talk to, and deal with, Indians). Neighbors also selected four non-Plains Indians, John Harry (Delaware), Joe Ellis and Tom Coshatee (Shawnees), and Patrick Goin (Choctaw). Neighbors put Shaw in charge of the Indians.

Neighbors was able to convince Buffalo Hump to lead the expedition through the Comancheria. Though the Chief later left the party, it remained under his protection, and another Comanche Chief, Guadalope, led the party the remainder of the distance from the Colorado River to El Paso. Neighbors' ability to communicate with the Comanche, and his relationship with them, made the expedition possible. The expedition left the Torrey Trading House on March 23, 1849, and began the journey north. Neighbors had business with the camp of the Comanche chief Old Owl, so he traveled northeast up the eastern bank of the Leon River and spent a week there. The expedition then crossed the Leon River and proceeded south to Sanaco's camp on the upper Colorado River, arriving there April 2, 1849.

At this point, Buffalo Hump left the party, and Neighbors then engaged Guadalupe, the Chief of a Comanche band, to guide the expedition on to El Paso. Leaving the Colorado River, the expedition moved west on April 5, 1849, and managed the Horsehead Crossing over the Pecos River on April 17, 1849. Though they experienced considerable difficulty with the weather and terrain, they were able to cross the far northern end of the Davis Mountains, north of what is today the University of Texas at Austin McDonald Observatory.

They crossed the Rio Grande on April 25, 1849, where they discovered the tracks of shod horses, and determined these were the tracks of Whiting's expedition, which had crossed the Rio Grande at that point on its return to Austin.

The Neighbors expedition then continued up the east bank of the Rio Grande toward El Paso and arrived there on May 2, 1849. Neighbors determined the last hundred or so miles they had traveled were completely unsuitable for a wagon road, so he then returned by a more northern route that had been used by the Mexican army between El Paso and the Pecos River. The Expedition began its return on May 6, 1849, by way of Hueco Tanks, Ojo del Alamo, and the Guadalupe Mountains en route to the Pecos River, and home.

== Return home, and the route to El Paso ==
On the return home, the expedition was guided by a Mexican National, Señor Zambrano. Neighbors found, and later reported to the military, that this return route from El Paso to the Pecos could serve as a wagon or stage road, which it became. The expedition entered Fredericksburg, Texas, on May 31 and San Antonio on June 2, only eight days after Whiting, who had left far earlier, and who was unable to provide a good road to El Paso.

Neighbors original trip to El Paso had taken twenty-three days of actual travel time, but he was able to return to San Antonio in only twenty-one days by a far easier route. Neighbors reported to Gen. William Selby Harney, who had replaced General Worth as Commander of the Eighth Army Department or District, and recommended the return route as the trail the Army sought. General Harney then sent out parties to further survey Neighbors's recommended route. They concurred with Neighbors findings, and this came to be known as the Upper or Northern route.

== Highways follow the same route today ==
Not only settlers, but the Butterfield Overland Mail later ran on this route from the Concho River to El Paso. Today's modern highways and railroads run over roughly the same routes as the Neighbors outbound and returning trails. Neighbors and Ford reported the distance from Austin to El Paso as 598 miles, the same distance shown on modern road maps.

== See also ==
- Kenneth F. Neighbours, "The Expedition of Major Robert S. Neighbors to El Paso in 1849," Southwestern Historical Quarterly 58 (July 1954).
- Kenneth Neighbours, ed., "The Report of the Expedition of Major Robert S. Neighbors to El Paso in 1849," Southwestern Historical Quarterly 60 (April 1957).
- Kenneth F. Neighbours, Robert Simpson Neighbors and the Texas Frontier, 1836-1859 (Waco: Texian Press, 1975). Robert Simpson Neighbors Papers, Barker Texas History Center, University of Texas at Austin
