= Jeremy Gara =

Canadian drummer (born 1978)

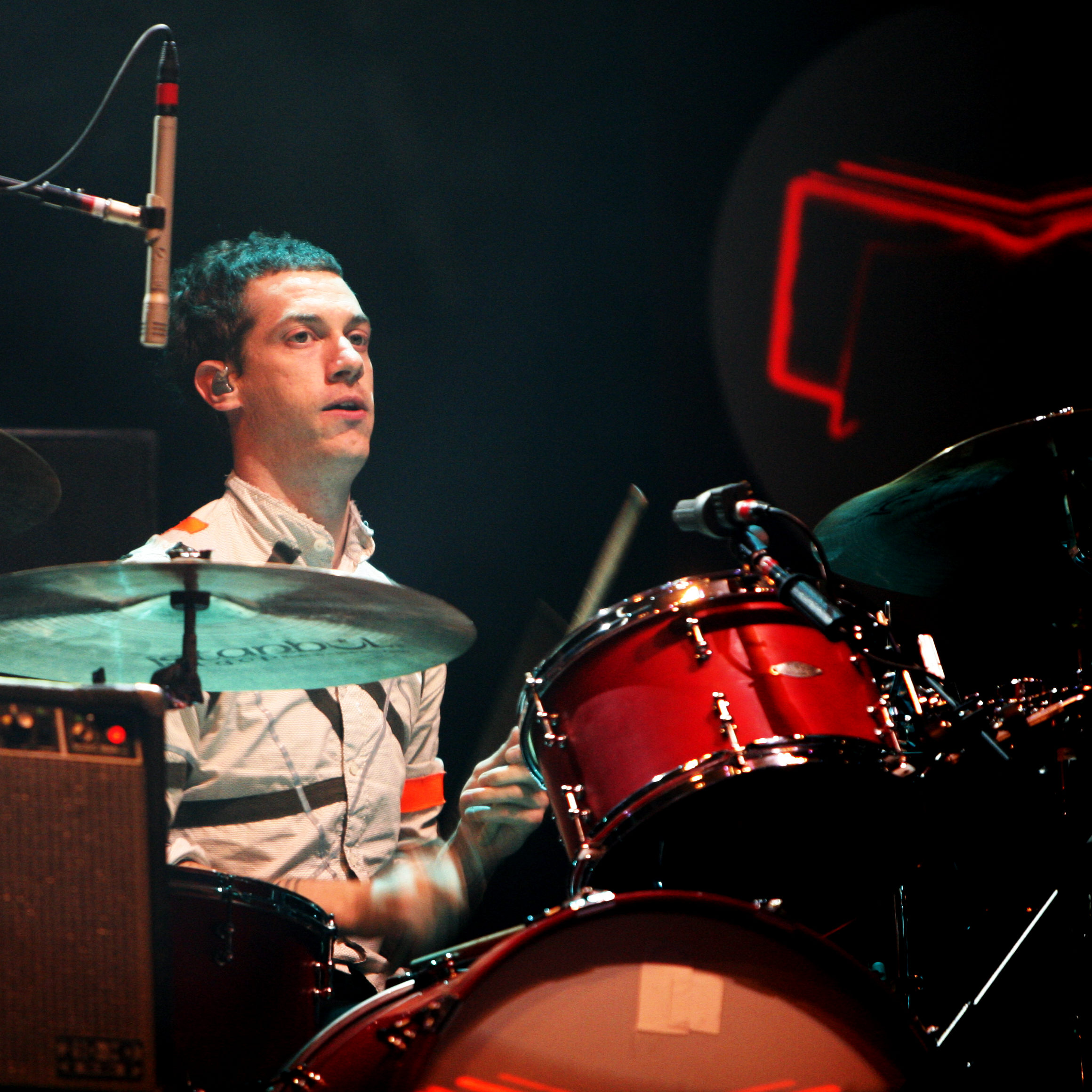
- Gara performing with Arcade Fire at Eurockéennes 2007

Background information
- Born: June 6, 1978 (age 48)
- Origin: Ottawa, Ontario, Canada
- Genres: Indie rock
- Occupation: Drummer
- Instruments: Drums; percussion; guitar; keyboards
- Member of: Arcade Fire

Jeremy Gara (born June 6, 1978) is a Canadian drummer from Ottawa, Ontario. He is most well known as the drummer of the band Arcade Fire. Gara is an active performer in a number of other projects, including work as a solo performer.

== Career ==
Gara currently is a member of the indie rock band Arcade Fire. He has played in many other bands in the past, including slowcore band Kepler and math rock band Weights and Measures and well as a frequent collaborator with Michael Feuerstack. He also had a part in the eponymously-titled album Arizona Amp and Alternator, a project of musician Howe Gelb. He is endorsed by Istanbul Agop Cymbals and C&C Custom Drum Company. He has also been involved in the bands Clark, Snailhouse (with fellow Arcade Fire member Sarah Neufeld) and The New International Standards (with Arcade Fire members Richard Reed Parry and Tim Kingsbury). He recently played percussion on Owen Pallett's Heartland album (Pallett being a former member and regular contributor to Arcade Fire).

As with other members of Arcade Fire, during live performances he often swaps instruments with other members of the band between songs, often taking on the role of an extra guitarist on certain songs.

On January 14, 2016, Jeremy Gara announced he would release debut solo record Limn on March 11, 2016, sharing the video for album track "Divinity". The album is a primarily composed of improvisation and is accompanied by artwork created by Gara. Reviewers have noted it fits in with the Montreal electronic scene and potentially has little crossover appeal.

Gara has also occasionally filled in on drums on the television program Late Night with Seth Meyers.

== Discography ==
Kepler

- 2000: Fuck Fight Fail (Troubleman Unlimited)
- 2002: Missionless Days (Resonant Records)
- 2005: Attic Salt (Troubleman Unlimited)

Arcade Fire

- 2007: Neon Bible (Merge Records)
- 2010: The Suburbs (City Slang)
- 2013: Reflektor (Sonovox Records)
- 2017: Everything Now (Sonovox Records)
- 2022: We (Sonovox Records)

Arizona Amp and Alternator

- 2005: Arizona Amp and Alternator (AAAA)

Susanna Wallumrød

- 2012: Wild Dog (Sonovox Records)

Marnie Stern

- 2023 : The Comeback Kid (Joyful Noise Records)

Solo release

- 2016: Limn (NRCSS Industry)
- 2020: Passerine Finale (Invada Records)
