= Will Butler =

American musician

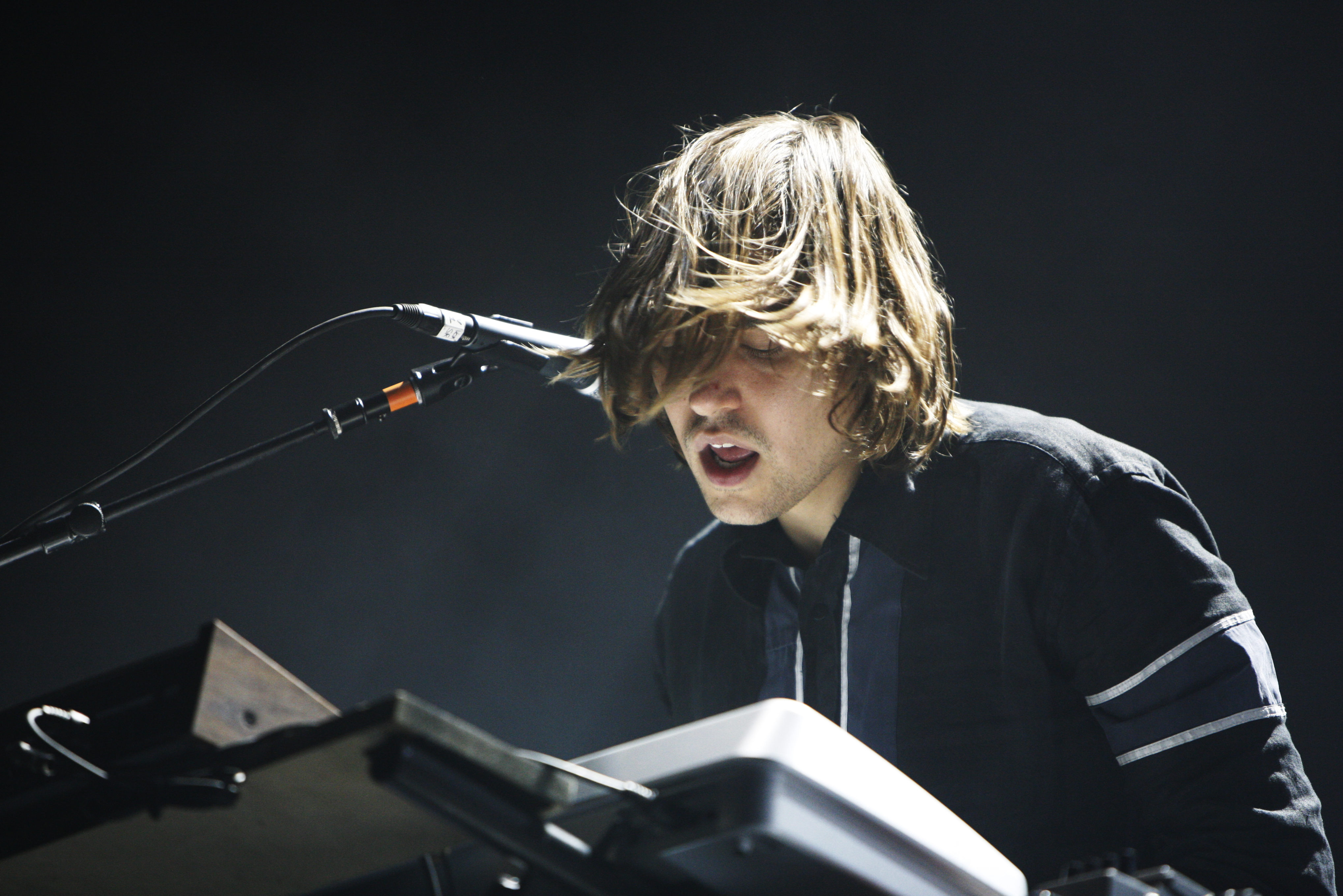
- Will Butler performing in July 2007.

Background information
- Born: William Pierce Butler; October 6, 1982 (age 43); Truckee, California, U.S.
- Origin: The Woodlands, Texas, U.S.
- Genres: Indie rock
- Occupations: Musician; composer
- Instruments: Keyboards; synthesizers; bass; guitar; vocals; percussion
- Label: Merge Records
- Formerly of: Arcade Fire

William Pierce Butler (born October 6, 1982) is an American multi-instrumentalist and composer. He is best known as a former member of the indie rock band Arcade Fire, with whom he recorded six studio albums. Butler was a member of the band for eighteen years, between 2003 and 2021, and played synthesizer, bass, guitar and percussion. He is known for his spontaneity, energy and antics during live performances and is the younger brother of Arcade Fire frontman Win Butler. In 2010, he won a Grammy Award for Album of the Year as part of Arcade Fire.

In 2014, Butler was nominated for the Academy Award for Best Original Score for his work on the original score of the 2013 film Her. In 2024, Butler was nominated for two Tony Awards for his orchestrations & score of the play Stereophonic, which itself was nominated for and won Best Play. Butler has released three solo studio albums – Policy (2015), Generations (2020), and Will Butler + Sister Squares (2023) – on Merge Records.

== Life and career ==
Born in Truckee, California, United States, and raised in The Woodlands, Texas, Will is the son of Liza Rey, a classical musician, and Edwin Farnham Butler II, a geologist. His maternal grandfather was guitarist Alvino Rey. He graduated from Phillips Exeter Academy in 2001, where he lived in Abbot Hall, and subsequently attended Northwestern University, majoring in Poetry and Slavic studies. During this time, he worked as a DJ for the WNUR Rock Show, where he also hired Nathan Amundson of Rivulets to be a substitute DJ at WNUR-FM. He also served as the poetry editor of Northwestern's literary magazine, Helicon. An excerpt of a poem from his senior thesis is quoted in Brian Bouldrey's book, Honorable Bandit: A Walk Across Corsica. While at Northwestern, Butler lived in Chicago, Illinois. He moved to Montreal, Quebec, Canada in the mid-2000s to join his brother Win Butler and band Arcade Fire.

In January 2008, Butler married dancer Jenny Shore.

In January 2014, Butler and Owen Pallett were nominated for Best Original Score at the 86th Academy Awards for their original score of Her.

Butler was a student at the Harvard Kennedy School of Government where he pursued a Mid-Career Master in Public Administration.

In March 2022, Butler announced he had left Arcade Fire at the end of the previous year, stating "there was no acute reason beyond that I've changed—and the band has changed—over the last almost 20 years. Time for new things." The band's album We, released on May 6, 2022, was Butler's last performance with Arcade Fire on a studio album.

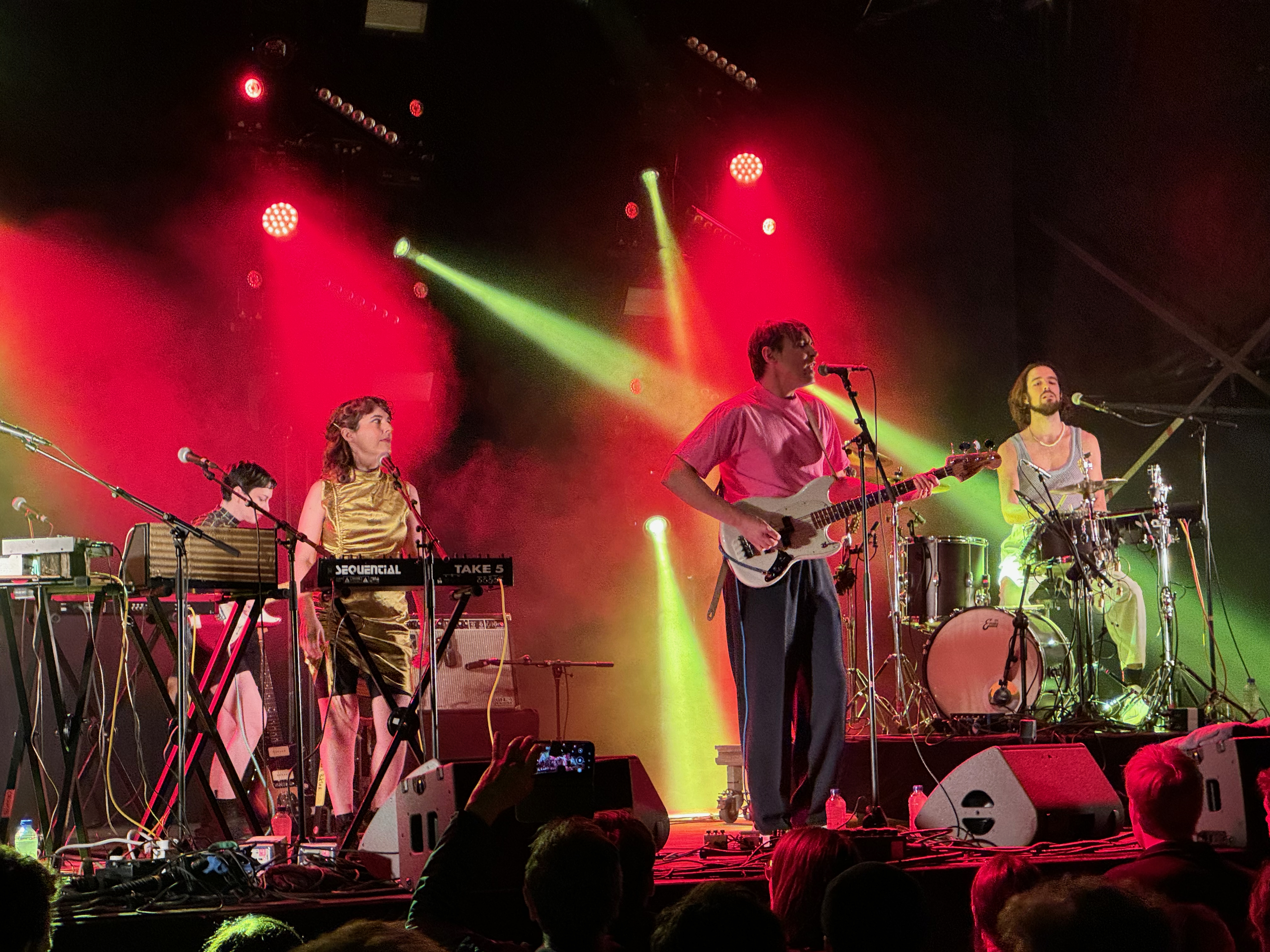
Butler performing with Sister Squares at Valkhof Festival in Nijmegen, the Netherlands in 2024.

Butler is now part of Will Butler + Sister Squares.

== Solo career ==
On March 3, 2015, Butler's debut solo album Policy was released under Merge Records, accompanied by an international tour alongside Arcade Fire drummer Jeremy Gara. According to Butler, Policy is intended to reflect his omnivorous musical taste.

Butler wrote five songs for The Guardian, based on news headlines, with each song created and shared a day apart. They were mixed properly and released on Policy Deluxe in May 2015.

Butler's song "Sun Comes Up" from the 2016 solo album Friday Night caught the ear of DJ B-Roc of The Knocks, and subsequently the Knocks-produced remix of the song was released alongside a video directed by Butler, filmed in part on the New York City subway system.

Butler wrote original songs for David Adjmi's play Stereophonic, which was originally scheduled to premier in 2021, but due to the coronavirus was pushed back until October 2023. Following the play's Broadway debut in 2024, Butler received two Tony nominations: one for Best Original Score and another for Best Orchestrations.

== Discography ==
=== Studio albums ===
- Policy (Merge Records, 2015)
- Friday Night (Merge Records, 2016)
- Generations (Merge Records, 2020)
- Will Butler + Sister Squares (Merge Records, 2023)

=== Singles ===
- "Anna" (2015)

=== Music videos ===
- "What I Want" (2015)
- "Anna" (2015)
