= Tim Kingsbury =

Canadian indie rock guitarist (born 1977)

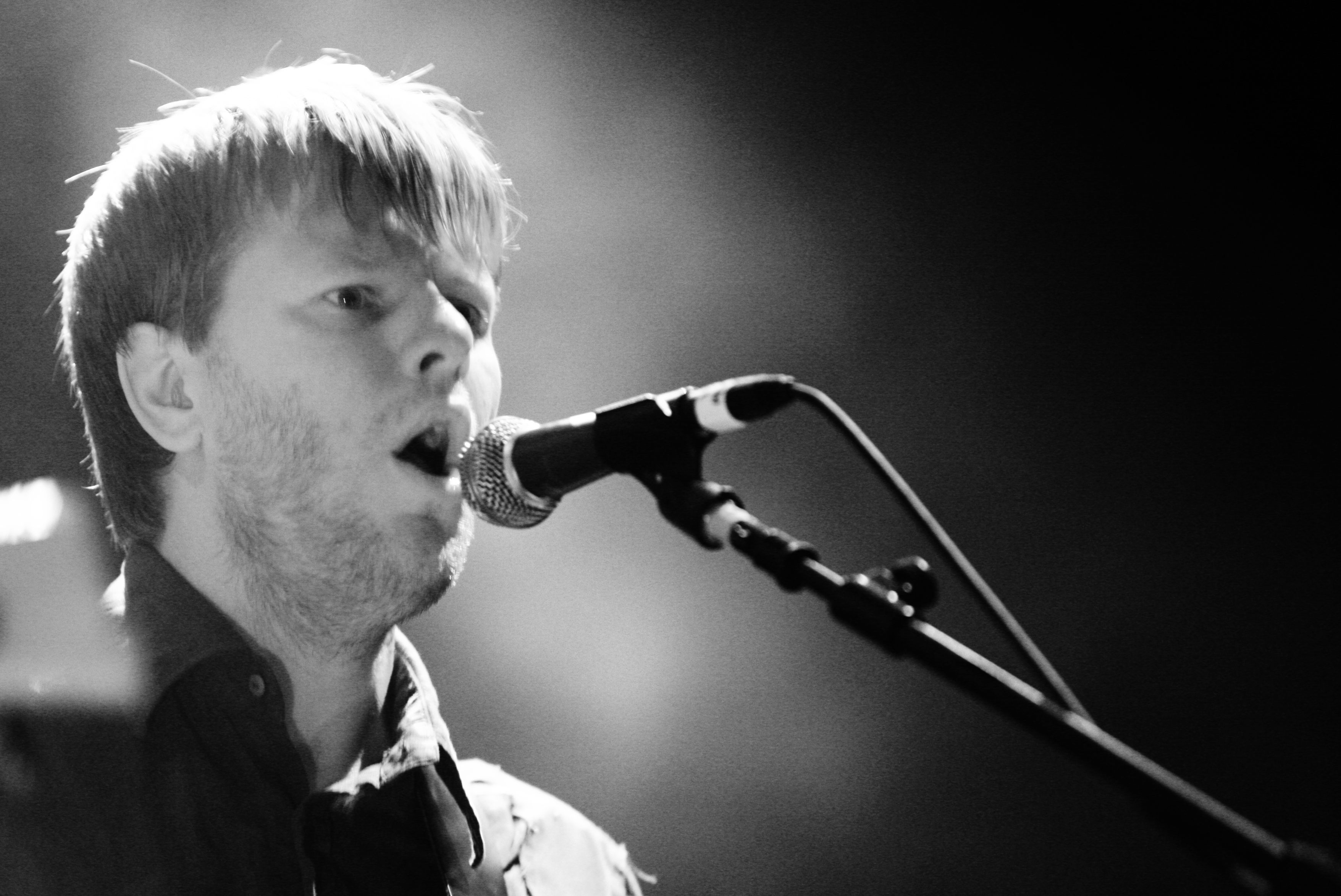
- Kingsbury performing in 2007

Background information
- Born: Tim Kingsbury
- Origin: Guelph, Ontario, Canada
- Genres: Indie rock
- Occupation: Musician
- Instruments: Bass guitar; double bass; guitar; piano; keyboards; vocals

Tim Kingsbury (born 1977) is a Canadian musician and member of the indie rock band Arcade Fire. He plays bass guitar, guitar, and occasionally keyboards.

== Early life ==
Kingsbury spent his early years living in and around Guelph, Ontario. He comes from a musical family; his mother Birdie was a pianist and a music director and Parkwood Gardens Community church in Guelph, and Kingsbury sang in the church choir. His brother Brett is a professional classical pianist. After piano lessons as a child, Kingsbury stopped playing music until a friend of his mother gave him a guitar when he was fourteen. He began to teach himself to play and write music. Kingsbury attended John F. Ross in Guelph where he began playing in bands when he was sixteen. Christian rock was an early influence for Kingsbury, especially the music of pioneering American Christian rock artist Larry Norman. Kingsbury cites his later influences as Pavement and Palace and Dinosaur Jr. He played with Gentleman Reg while in high school, only playing one show outside of Guelph.

== Career ==
After high school, Kingsbury moved to Ottawa where he played with a number of bands such as the Killers and Geoffrey Pye, before joining Clark the band. While in Ottawa he met Jeremy Gara. The two played together in a band in Ottawa and would later move to Montreal and play together in The New International Standards, Arcade Fire and Kingsbury's solo project, Sam Patch.

Kingsbury moved to Montreal in 2001. Kingsbury had a hard time finding full-time work with a band and made ends meet by working as a telemarketer for a pharmaceutical company. At the same time, he played in a number of bands, including the New International Standards. The New International Standards included Richard Reed Parry, Annesley Black and Mike Feuerstack. The band was active for about two years. It was Parry that brought Kingsbury into Arcade Fire.

=== Arcade Fire ===
Kingsbury began to play with Arcade Fire in 2003 after the break-up of the band's original membership. Although Kingsbury primarily plays bass in Arcade Fire, he also plays guitar and sings.

Guelph continues to be a contact for Kingsbury and the fellow members of Arcade Fire. Arcade Fire performed at Guelph's Hillside Festival in 2005, a performance Sam Baijal, artistic director of Hillside, credits with giving the Festival a huge boost in popularity.

=== Other projects ===
Kingsbury also toured and recorded with Montreal band Wolf Parade as a bassist, appearing on the album the 2005 album Apologies to the Queen Mary. He has also been involved with the bands Clark and The New International Standards in addition to recording as a solo artist.

=== Sam Patch ===
In August 2015 he launched a side project under the name "Sam Patch" along with fellow Arcade Fire member Jeremy Gara and Toronto artist Basia Bulat. He played his first show as Sam Patch at Montreal's Bar Le Ritz. Kingsbury began writing music while on tour with Arcade Fire and recorded the album Yeah You, and I post-tour, with Gara, Bulat. John McEntire of the bands Sea and Cake, and Tortoise and fellow Tortoise member Doug McCombs also appear. Kingsbury named the project after an early 19th-century daredevil by the same name. Sam Patch, also known as the Jersey Jumper, would jump from bridges, buildings and other heights, including the Niagara River at the base of the Falls. Patch met his death in 1829 attempting a stunt at Rochester's High Falls.

Kingsbury recorded the song "In to Trouble" for the film 2020 film Pieces of a Woman, and in 2021 released the song as a digital single.
