= TV on the Radio discography =

This article contains a comprehensive discography of the American rock band TV on the Radio.

== Studio albums ==
List of studio albums, with selected chart positions
Title	Album details	Peak chart positions									
Title	Album details	US	AUS	BEL (FL)	BEL (WA)	CAN	FRA	GER	IRL	SWI	UK
Desperate Youth, Blood Thirsty Babes	Released: March 9, 2004; Label: Touch and Go, 4AD; Formats: LP, CD, download	— (Note: Desperate Youth, Blood Thirsty Babes did not enter the US Billboard 200, but peaked at number 15 on the US Heatseekers Albums Chart.)	—	—	—	—	190	—	—	—	175
Return to Cookie Mountain	Released: July 6, 2006 (world) September 12, 2006 (U.S./Canada); Label: Interscope, 4AD; Formats: LP, CD, download	41	50	52	55	—	60	61	—	—	90
Dear Science	Released: September 22, 2008 (world) September 23, 2008 (U.S./Canada); Label: Interscope, 4AD; Formats: LP, CD, download	12	26	20	41	26	57	76	27	77	33
Nine Types of Light	Released: April 11, 2011 (world) April 12, 2011 (U.S./Canada); Label: Interscope; Formats: LP, CD, download	12	25	51	68	19	76	68	33	65	33
Seeds	Released: November 18, 2014; Label: Harvest Records; Formats: LP, CD, download	22	42	100	120	—	159	—	—	73	78
"—" denotes a recording that did not chart or was not released in that territory.

=== Demo albums ===
Title	Album details
OK Calculator	July 24, 2002; Self-released

== EPs ==
Title	EP details
Young Liars	July 8, 2003; Touch and Go
Staring at the Sun	June 25, 2004; 4AD
New Health Rock	October 12, 2004; Touch and Go
iTunes Live Sessions	2007; Touch and Go
Live at Amoeba Music	March 27, 2007; Interscope
Read Silence	April 14, 2009; Interscope

== Singles ==
List of singles, with selected chart positions, showing year released and album name
Title	Year	Peak chart positions										Certifications	Album
Title	Year	US Sales	US Rock	AUS Hit.	BEL (FL)	CAN Rock	ICE	MEX Air.	SCO	UK	UK Indie	Certifications	Album
"Staring at the Sun"	2004	—	—	—	—	—	—	—	—	—	—		Desperate Youth, Blood Thirsty Babes
"New Health Rock"	2004	11	—	—	—	—	—	—	75	76	13		Non-album singles
"Dry Drunk Emperor"	2005	—	—	—	—	—	—	—	—	—	—		Non-album singles
"Wolf Like Me"	2006	—	— (Note: "Wolf Like Me" did not enter the Hot Rock & Alternative Songs chart, but peaked at number 37 on the Alternative Airplay chart.)	—	—	—	—	—	57	89	6	RIAA: Platinum	Return to Cookie Mountain
"Province"	2006	—	—	—	—	—	—	—	—	—	—		Return to Cookie Mountain
"Golden Age"	2008	—	—	—	—	—	—	—	—	—	—		Dear Science
"Dancing Choose"	2008	—	—	—	—	—	—	—	—	—	9		Dear Science
"Crying"	2009	—	—	—	—	—	—	17	—	—	—		Dear Science
"Family Tree"	2009	—	—	—	—	—	—	—	—	—	—		Dear Science
"Will Do"	2011	—	48	17	—	—	—	29	—	—	—		Nine Types of Light
"Caffeinated Consciousness"	2011	—	—	—	—	—	—	37	—	—	—		Nine Types of Light
"Mercy"	2013	—	—	—	—	—	—	44	—	—	—		Non-album singles
"Million Miles"	2013	—	—	—	—	—	—	—	—	—	—		Non-album singles
"Happy Idiot"	2014	—	42	—	139	49	17	41	—	—	—		Seeds
"Careful You"	2014	—	—	—	—	—	—	—	—	—	—		Seeds
"Trouble"	2015	—	—	—	—	—	—	—	—	— (Note: "Trouble" did not enter the UK Singles Chart, but peaked at number 82 on the UK Physical Singles Chart.)	—		Seeds
"Final Fantasy"	2024	—	—	—	—	—	—	—	—	—	—		Non-album single
"—" denotes releases that did not chart or were not released in that region.

=== Other ===
- The Late Great Daniel Johnston: Discovered Covered (cover album) – "Walking the Cow"
- Warm & Scratchy (Adult Swim compilation album) – "Me – I" (featuring Derek Thomas Ambrosi)
- War Child Presents Heroes (charity covers compilation) – "Heroes" (David Bowie cover)

=== Remixes ===
- Bumblebeez 81 "Pony Ride (TV on the Radio Remix)" (2004), 81 Records
- Fischerspooner "Never Win (TV on the Radio Hoof-Hearted Mix)" (2005), FS Studios
- Gang Gang Dance "First Communion (TV on the Radio Remix)" (2009), Sinedín Music

=== Videography ===
- "Staring at the Sun" (March 2004, directed by Elliot Jokelson)
- "Wolf Like Me" (September 2006, directed by Jon Watts)
- "Province" (January 2007, directed by Jeff Scheven)
- "Me - I" (May 2007, directed by Daniel Garcia & Mixtape Club)
- "Golden Age" (September 2008, directed by Petro Papahadjopoulos)
- "Dancing Choose" (September 2008, directed by Brad & Brian Palmer)
- "Will Do" (March 2011, directed by Dugan O'Neal)
- "Nine Types of Light" (April 2011, multiple videos directed by varying directors)
- "Second Song" (May 2011, directed by Michael Please)
- "Million Miles" (August 2013, directed by Natalia Leite and Kyp Malone)
- "Mercy" (September 2013, directed by Dawn Garcia)
- "Happy Idiot" (October 2014, directed by Danny Jelinek)
- "Lazerray" (December 2014, directed by Atiba Jefferson)
- "Trouble" (April 2015)
