= The Modern Tribe =

Studio album by Celebration
- Released: October 8, 2007
- Recorded: February 2007
- Studio: Stay Gold Studios (Brooklyn, NY)
- Genre: Indie rock
- Length: 44:11
- Label: 4AD
- Producer: Dave Sitek

Celebration chronology
Celebration (2006)	The Modern Tribe (2007)	Hello Paradise (2011)

Professional ratings
Review scores
Source	Rating
AllMusic	4.5/5 stars
Alternative Press	3/5
Drowned in Sound	8/10
laut.de	2/5 stars
musicOMH	3/5 stars
Pitchfork	6.5/10
PopMatters	7/10
The A.V. Club	B+
The Guardian	3/5 stars
The Line of Best Fit	65/100%

The Modern Tribe is the second studio album by American indie rock band Celebration from Baltimore. It was released on October 9, 2007, via 4AD. Recording sessions took place in February 2007 at Stay Gold Studios in Brooklyn. Production was handled by Dave Sitek. It features contributions from TV on the Radio, Stuart Bogie, Akwetey & Aku of Dragons of Zynth, Nick Zinner, Martín Perna, Eric Biondo, Ryan Sawyer, Gary Sitek, Chris Coady, Richard Harper, Alianna Kalaba, Tatiana McCabe, Noah Rubin and Raedawn.

== Track listing ==
No.	Title	Length
1.	"Evergreen"	3:41
2.	"Pressure"	5:28
3.	"Heartbreak"	4:39
4.	"Pony"	3:37
5.	"Fly the Fly"	3:43
6.	"Tame the Savage"	4:29
7.	"Hands off My Gold"	3:20
8.	"In This Land"	4:02
9.	"Comets"	4:07
10.	"Wildcats"	3:08
11.	"Our Hearts Don't Change"	3:57
Total length:		44:11

== Personnel ==
- Katrina Ford — songwriter, lyrics, vocals, choir, percussion
- Sean Antanaitis — songwriter, choir, Hammond organ, Moog pedal bass, Würlitzer piano, guitorgan, guitar, vibraphone, mellotron
- David Bergander — songwriter, choir, drums, percussion
- David Andrew Sitek — choir, acoustic guitar (track 11), horns arrangement, producer
- Stuart Bogie — tenor saxophone (tracks: 2–4, 7, 8, 10), bass clarinet (tracks: 2, 10), choir, horns arrangement
- Babatunde Adebimpe — toasting (track 4), vocals (track 11), choir
- Akwetey Orraca-Tetteh — vocals (track 8), choir
- Aku Orraca-Tetteh — vocals (track 10), choir
- Kyp Malone — vocals (tracks: 2, 7), choir
- Jaleel Bunton — vocals (track 3), choir
- Chris Coady — choir, engineering
- Alianna Kalaba — choir
- Tatiana McCabe — choir
- Noah Rubin — choir
- Raedawn — choir
- Gary Sitek — gong
- Nick Zinner — guitar (tracks: 1, 7)
- Martín Perna — flute (tracks: 2, 4), baritone saxophone (tracks: 3, 7, 8)
- Eric Biondo — trumpet (tracks: 3, 7, 8)
- Ryan Sawyer — drums (track 11)
- Richard Harper — handclaps (track 2)
- Eon Gatignolo — artwork
