= Province (song) =

Single by TV on the Radio

from the album Return to Cookie Mountain
- Released: May 8, 2006
- Genre: Indie rock, experimental rock, soul
- Length: 4:35
- Label: 4AD
- Songwriters: Tunde Adebimpe, David Sitek, Kyp Malone, Jaleel Bunton, Gerard Smith
- Producer: Dave Sitek

TV on the Radio singles chronology
"Wolf Like Me" (2006)	"Province" (2006)	"Golden Age" (2008)

"Province" is the second single from TV on the Radio's album Return to Cookie Mountain. The song features David Bowie on backing vocals.

== Track listing ==
=== 7″ vinyl single ===
A1. Province (written by Kyp Malone)

- guitar, synthesizer, sampler, bass: David Andrew Sitek
- vocals: Babatunde Adebimpe, David Bowie, Kyp Malone
- drums: Jaleel Bunton
- piano: Gerard Smith
- recorded by David Andrew Sitek
- additional vocals, drums recorded by Chris Coady
- mixed by Chris Coady

B1. Dumb Animal (written by Aku Orraca-Tetteh, David Andrew Sitek, Kyp Malone)

- vocals: Aku Orraca-Tetteh, Babatunde Adebimpe, Kyp Malone
- guitar, synthesizer, sampler, bass, piano: David Andrew Sitek
- recorded, mixed by Chris Moore

B2. Wasted Weekend (written by Smith)

- guitar, synthesizer, synth bass, sampler: David Andrew Sitek
- bells, singing bowls (Tibetan), cymbal: Ryan Sawyer
- vocals: Babatunde Adebimpe, Kyp Malone
- fuzz bass: Kyp Malone
- recorded, mixed by Chris Moore

Producer: Dave Sitek
Cover artwork by Conejo, technical artwork assistance by Dave Sitek

== Music video ==
A music video was produced for the song "Province", released in February 2007. Shot in black and white and directed by Jeff Scheven, it features Cynthia Udriot as a female soldier lip-syncing the song's lyrics. She is repeatedly shot, whereupon characters portrayed by band members Adebimpe and Malone revive her.
