= Golden Age (song) =

Single by TV on the Radio

from the album Dear Science
- Released: August 26, 2008
- Genre: Indie rock, funk rock
- Length: 4:11
- Label: 4AD
- Songwriters: Tunde Adebimpe, David Sitek, Kyp Malone, Jaleel Bunton, Gerard Smith
- Producer: Dave Sitek

TV on the Radio singles chronology
"Province" (2006)	"Golden Age" (2008)	"Dancing Choose" (2008)

"Golden Age" is a 2008 song by the band TV on the Radio, the first single from their album Dear Science. It was number 12 on Rolling Stone's list of the 100 Best Songs of 2008. Spin magazine chose the song as the 8th best song of the year. MTV ranked it as the 20th best song of the year, and Pitchfork chose it as the 51st best song of the year.

The rock band Phish began covering "Golden Age" at their concerts in 2009; through January 2026 it has played the song 87 times.
