= Staring at the Sun (TV on the Radio song) =

Single by TV on the Radio

from the album Desperate Youth, Blood Thirsty Babes
- B-side: "Freeway"; "On a Train"
- Released: June 25, 2004
- Genre: Indie rock, dark wave, post-punk revival
- Length: 4:01 (album version); 3:27 (single version)
- Label: 4AD
- Songwriter(s): David Andrew Sitek; Tunde Adebimpe
- Producer(s): David Andrew Sitek

TV on the Radio singles chronology
"Staring at the Sun" (2004)	"New Health Rock" (2004)

"Staring at the Sun" is the debut single of American indie rock band TV on the Radio, released in 2004. The CD single is enhanced with two different quality QuickTime video files of the title track's music video. The single's B-sides, "Freeway" and "On a Train", were taken from their OK Calculator release.

The song was listed at #41 on Pitchfork Media's "Top 500 songs of the 2000s".

Band member Dave Sitek has said that the song was written over the course of two days.

The song is recognizable by its heavy fuzz bass line, and rapidly strummed, distorted guitar single notes. Tunde Adebimpe and David Andrew Sitek were the only TV on the Radio members to play on this track, with guest appearances from Nick Zinner of Yeah Yeah Yeahs on guitar and Katrina Ford of Celebration on backing vocals.

== Track listing ==
No.	Title	Length
1.	"Staring at the Sun"	3:26
2.	"Freeway"	2:15
3.	"On a Train" (2:56 on 7" single; listed as "∞" on label, so probably ends in a locked groove)	15:55
