= Maximum Balloon =

Studio album by Maximum Balloon
- Released: September 21, 2010
- Genre: Indie rock
- Length: 38:28
- Label: DGC; Interscope
- Producer: David Andrew Sitek

Maximum Balloon is the debut solo studio album by American musician and record producer Dave Sitek. It was released on September 21, 2010, via DGC/Interscope Records. Produced by Sitek himself, it features guest appearances from Aku of D.O.Z, Ambrosia Parsley, David Byrne, Holly Miranda, Karen O, Katrina Ford, Little Dragon and Theophilus London, as well as his TV on the Radio bandmates Kyp Malone and Tunde Adebimpe.

The album was placed at number 24 on Rolling Stone's list of the 30 Best Albums of 2010.

== Critical reception ==
Professional ratings
Aggregate scores
Source	Rating
Metacritic	76/100
Review scores
Source	Rating
AllMusic	3.5/5 stars
Drowned in Sound	8/10
musicOMH	4/5 stars
NME	3.5/5 stars
Pitchfork	7.9/10
PopMatters	7/10
Rolling Stone	3.5/5 stars
Spin	3.5/5 stars
The A.V. Club	B
The Guardian	4/5 stars

Maximum Balloon was met with generally favourable reviews from music critics. At Metacritic, which assigns a normalized rating out of 100 to reviews from mainstream publications, the album received an average score of 76, based on sixteen reviews.

Neil Ashman of Drowned in Sound praised the project, saying that the album "really about a great producer/songwriter exhibiting his considerable talents free from the pressure and expectation of his day job". Sam Shepherd of musicOMH wrote: "Maximum Balloon is by no means a perfect album, but there are some fantastic performances to be found (Karen O, Ambrosia Parsley's sultry Pink Bricks). It's a shame that Sitek never steps up to the mic, but when you've got friends like these it doesn't really matter". Michael Cragg of The Guardian resumed: "it may lack the emotional depth of some of his previous work, but as instant gratification goes, it's pretty perfect". Chris Martins of The A.V. Club wrote: "the record's only real weakness is what should make it work for radio: There's nothing unexpected. For better or worse, that's also what separates Maximum Balloon from TVOTR". AllMusic's Heather Phares concluded: "overall, though, this is an enjoyable, danceable working holiday from Sitek, one that shows aspects of his music that bode well for his many other projects". Laura Snapes of NME wrote: "it feels like Maximum Balloon is a project that could inflate infinitely. Let's hope it does". Eric Allen Been of PopMatters stated: "Maximum Balloon, obviously, is not your typical TVOTR tour de force. But it doesn't aspire to be. What it simply seeks is to make your ass shake". Will Hermes of Rolling Stone noticed that "for his solo debut, Dave Sitek adds schwing to his smeared synths and swarming guitars, while an A list of New York voices rock midtempo goth-soul beats". Mikael Wood of Spin wrote: "on this solo-ish debut, though, he gives that funk factor full reign, recruiting pals Karen O and David Byrne to sing over synthed-up disco-rock that's brighter and bouncier than his main band's anxious throb. Maximum Balloon deflates when Sitek switches into avant-cabaret mode".

== Track listing ==
No.	Title	Writer(s)	Length
1.	"Groove Me" (featuring Theophilus London)	David Andrew Sitek; London	3:44
2.	"Young Love" (featuring Katrina Ford)	Sitek; Ford	3:28
3.	"Absence of Light" (featuring Tunde Adebimpe)	Sitek; Adebimpe	3:52
4.	"If You Return" (featuring Little Dragon)	Sitek; Little Dragon	4:24
5.	"Shakedown" (featuring Kyp Malone)	Sitek; Malone	3:34
6.	"Communion" (featuring Karen O)	Sitek; O	4:17
7.	"Tiger" (featuring Aku)	Sitek; Aku	3:35
8.	"The Lesson" (featuring Holly Miranda)	Sitek; Miranda	4:06
9.	"Apartment Wrestling" (vs. David Byrne)	Sitek; Byrne	3:39
10.	"Pink Bricks" (featuring Ambrosia Parsley)	Sitek; Parsley	3:49
Total length:			38:28

Digital deluxe edition bonus tracks
No.	Title	Writer(s)	Length
11.	"Lovely View" (featuring Nayfo)	Sitek; Nayfo	3:40
12.	"Quantum Exit"	Sitek	4:05
13.	"Groove Me" (Jneiro Jarel Remix) (featuring Theophilus London)	Sitek; London	3:40
14.	"Groove Me" (Doman & Gooding Remix) (featuring Theophilus London)	Sitek; London	5:34

== Charts ==
Chart (2010)	Peak position
Belgian Alternative Albums (Ultratop Flanders)	42
Belgian Heatseekers Albums (Ultratop Flanders)	6
Belgian Heatseekers Albums (Ultratop Wallonia)	15
UK Albums (OCC)	130
UK Album Downloads (OCC)	89
US Heatseekers Albums (Billboard)	5
