= Wolf Like Me (song) =

Single by TV on the Radio

from the album Return to Cookie Mountain
- Released: February 13, 2006
- Genre: Art rock; dance-rock
- Length: 4:39
- Label: 4AD
- Songwriters: Tunde Adebimpe, David Sitek, Kyp Malone, Jaleel Bunton, Gerard Smith
- Producer: Dave Sitek

TV on the Radio singles chronology
"New Health Rock" (2004)	"Wolf Like Me" (2006)	"Province" (2006)

Music video
- "Wolf Like Me" on YouTube

"Wolf Like Me" is the first single from American art rock band TV on the Radio's album Return to Cookie Mountain, released in the United Kingdom on July 25, 2006 on 4AD. The single's B-side was the song "Things You Can Do", which was also available as a bonus track on the U.S. release of Return to Cookie Mountain. It was released in two formats: CD single and 7-inch vinyl.

The song is the band's most successful single in the United States, where it peaked at number 37 on the Billboard Hot Modern Rock Tracks chart in 2006. It was also their second top 100 hit in the UK where it peaked at number 89.

"Wolf Like Me" was covered by the American alternative rock band Local H as the intro track on their EP Local H's Awesome Mix Tape 1, released in October 2010.

== Personnel ==
On "Wolf Like Me":

- Vocals – Tunde Adebimpe, Kyp Malone, Katrina Ford
- Drums – Jaleel Bunton
- Bass, guitar – Kyp Malone
- Guitar, samples, synth – Dave Sitek
- Guitar – Jaleel Bunton
- Baritone saxophone – Martin Perna

== Music video ==
The music video for "Wolf Like Me" starring poet Beau Sia was directed by Jon Watts and mixes two cinematic styles: black-and-white silent film and 1980s B-movie. America's Next Top Model cycle 4 winner Naima Mora was also featured in the video.

== Reception ==
"Wolf Like Me" was voted in at number 63 in the Triple J Hottest 100, 2006, and at number 99 in the Triple J Hottest 100 of All Time, 2009. In October 2011, NME placed "Wolf Like Me" at number 46 on its list "150 Best Tracks of the Past 15 Years". In October 2026, Rolling Stone placed the song at number 18 on its list "The 200 Best Rock Songs of the 21st Century".

== In popular culture ==
The song was featured in several racing video games Project Gotham Racing 4, Driver: San Francisco, Need for Speed: ProStreet and The Crew, as well is a playable song on Battle of the Bands and Guitar Hero 5. The song was featured in One Tree Hill in the season 4 episode "Some You Give Away", which originally aired in 2006. The song plays during the closing credits/final minutes of Rescue Me Season 4, Episode 2, titled "Tuesday", which originally aired on June 20, 2007. The song was featured in the 2008 film Never Back Down, as well as the 2007 film The Invisible and the 2013 film Kill Your Darlings. In January 2010, it was used in a TV commercial "Destiny – Force Fate" by Nike to promote the 2010 Winter Olympics. In October 2022, the song was featured in the stop-motion animated film Wendell & Wild.

The song received renewed interest in 2026 after it was featured in the film Spider-Man: Brand New Day, increasing its streams 800% compared to the previous month.

== Charts ==
Chart (2006)	Peak position
US Alternative Airplay (Billboard)	37
Scottish Singles Sales (Official Charts)	57
UK Singles (Official Charts)	89
UK Indie (Official Charts)	6

== Certifications ==
Region	Certification	Certified units/sales
New Zealand (RMNZ)	Gold	15,000^{‡}
United States (RIAA)	Platinum	1,000,000^{‡}
^{‡} Sales+streaming figures based on certification alone.
