= Live at Amoeba Music =

Live album by TV on the Radio
- Released: March 27, 2007
- Recorded: Ameoba Music, 22 September 2006
- Genre: Indie rock, experimental rock, art rock, funk rock
- Length: 25:58
- Label: Interscope

TV on the Radio chronology
Return to Cookie Mountain (2006)	Live at Amoeba Music (2007)	Dear Science (2008)

Professional ratings
Review scores
Source	Rating
Robert Christgau	(2-star Honorable Mention)
Pitchfork Media	6.9/10

Live at Amoeba Music is a live EP by the New York City band TV on the Radio. Released in 2007 on Interscope Records, the EP contains four live tracks recorded during an in-store performance at Los Angeles music store Amoeba Music on September 22, 2006. It is only available through Indie Record Shops. All of the tracks are taken from their critically acclaimed 2006 album Return to Cookie Mountain.

== Track listing ==
1. "Blues from Down Here" – 5:43
2. "Wolf Like Me" – 5:15
3. "Province" – 5:09
4. "Wash the Day" – 7:51
