= Happy Idiot =

Single by TV on the Radio

from the album Seeds
- Released: September 2, 2014
- Studio: Sonic Ranch
- Length: 3:03
- Label: Harvest
- Songwriter(s): Daniel Ledinsky, Erik Hassle
- Producer(s): Dave Sitek

TV on the Radio singles chronology
"Million Miles" (2013)	"Happy Idiot" (2014)	"Careful You" (2014)

"Happy Idiot" is the first single from American indie rock band TV on the Radio's fifth studio album Seeds.

== Background ==
TV on the Radio's lead singer Tunde Adebimpe clarified to Music Feeds that Happy Idiot's lyrics were about distancing from the shock of an event and placing oneself in danger.

== Composition ==
In an interview with Rolling Stone, guitarist Dave Sitek explained the step by step process of "Happy Idiot". Sitek started creating the song at Sonic Ranch by arranging the musical instruments. After songwriters Daniel Ledinsky and Erik Hassle created the melody, the rest of TV on the Radio added their contributions to complete the song.

== Reception ==
Critics both praised and panned the music style in "Happy Idiot". Slate Magazine likened the song's new wave style to a combination of The Police and Joy Division. However, Beat Magazine opined that the usage of hi-hats did not add anything to "Happy Idiot", and called the song "nothing more, nothing less, nothing revelatory", while Spin Magazine called the song "a typically straining post-punk exercise".

== Music video ==
On October 3, 2014, TV on the Radio released a music video for "Happy Idiot" referencing Speed Racer. In the music video directed by Danny Jelinek, Paul Reubens plays a racecar driver that is hallucinating about a girl played by Karen Gillan.

In a statement by Tunde Adebimpe, Adebimpe said that he came up with the idea for the music video and approached Funny or Die, who accepted the idea. He also highlighted that Paul Reubens was a big influence on him, and that he was excited to work with Karen Gillan.

== Charts ==
Chart (2014–2015)	Peak position
Belgium (Ultratip Bubbling Under Flanders)	89
Canada Rock (Billboard)	49
Iceland (RÚV)	17
Mexico Ingles Airplay (Billboard)	41
US Adult Alternative Songs (Billboard)	20
US Alternative Airplay (Billboard)	27
US Hot Rock & Alternative Songs (Billboard)	42
US Rock Airplay (Billboard)	42
