= Wolf Like Me =

Wolf Like Me may refer to:

- "Wolf Like Me" (song), a song by TV on the Radio
- Wolf Like Me (TV series), an Australian streaming TV series
