= Read Silence =

EP by TV on the Radio
- Released: April 14, 2009
- Genre: Indie rock, art rock, funk
- Length: 17:19
- Label: Interscope
- Producer: Dave Sitek

TV on the Radio chronology
| Dear Science (2008) | Read Silence (2009) | Nine Types of Light (2011) |

Read Silence is a digital-only EP compilation of three song remixes from TV on the Radio's third studio album, Dear Science. It was released on April 14, 2009, on Interscope Records.

== Track listing ==
1. "Shout Me Out" (Willie Isz Remix by Jneiro Jarel) – 4:22
2. "Stork & Owl" (Gang Gang Dance Remix) – 7:31
3. "Red Dress" (The Glitch Mob Remix) – 5:26
