= Celebration (2000s band) =

American psychedelic soul band

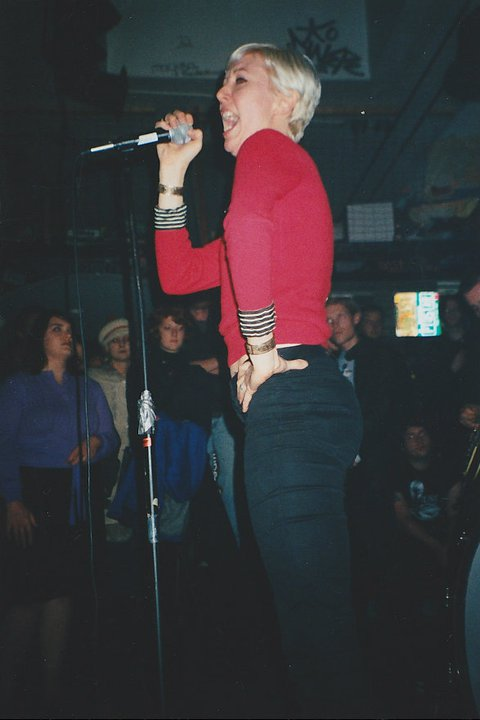
- Singer Katrina Ford, live in Olympia, Washington, in the early 2000s, with Celebration's previous band, Love Life.

Background information
- Origin: Baltimore, Maryland, U.S.
- Years active: 2004–present
- Labels: Friends Records, 4AD
- Members: Katrina Ford; Sean Antanaitis; David Bergander; Tony Drummond; Walker Teret; Tommy Rouse
- Website: Official website

Celebration is an American psychedelic soul band based in Baltimore, Maryland. Formed in 2004 the band is composed of singer Katrina Ford, multi-instrumentalist Sean Antanaitis and drummer David Bergander, with a number of additional rotating members. The band has released five albums while Ford has pursued a solo career since 2022.

== History ==
In the beginning, the band's sound as a three-piece was centered on the unique output provided by all the instruments played by Antanaitis in the studio as well as live. He would play all of the music in the band including organ, Moog bass pedals, guitorgan and electric keys, leaving Ford on vocals and Bergander on drums. Their first two records were produced with David Sitek of TV on the Radio. In addition to producing, Sitek also contributed guitar parts and synths. Other noteworthy members on the albums include Martin Perna and Stewart Bogle who contributed flute and sax into the mix.

Singer Katrina Ford also performed backing vocals on TV on the Radio's songs "Staring at the Sun" from their album Desperate Youth, Blood Thirsty Babes and "Wolf Like Me" off their album Return to Cookie Mountain. In August 2024, she released a solo single "Dundalk Dungueon".

The self produced Electric Tarot: Hello Paradise (Friends Records, 2010) with additional members. It was followed by Albumin in 2014 and Wounded Healer in 2017.

Ford released a self-titled solo EP in June 2022, accompanied by the single "Gleaming The Cube" via Violin Records. In August 2024, she released a solo single "Dundalk Dungueon".

== Members ==
- Katrina Ford (Vocals, Percussion)
- Sean Antanaitis (Guitar, Guitorgan, Organ, Wurlitzer, Piano, Moog Pedal Bass, electronics)
- David Bergander (Drums, Percussion)

== Discography ==
=== Albums ===
- Celebration – (October, 2005)
- The Modern Tribe – (October, 2007)
- Hello Paradise:Electric Tarrot – (December, 2010)
- Albumin – (August, 2014)
- Wounded Healer – (June, 2017)

=== Singles ===
- "Diamonds" – (December 5, 2005)
- "War" – (February 20, 2006)
- "New Skin" – (May 22, 2006)

=== Appearances ===
- David Bergander and Sean Antanaitis appear on the album Anywhere I Lay My Head by Scarlett Johansson.
- Katrina Ford appears on the album Villainaire by The Dead Science, Maximum Balloon by David Andrew Sitek, and on the albums Desperate Youth, Bloodthirsty Babes, Return to Cookie Mountain and Dear Science, all by TV on the Radio. She appears on the song "In The Fall" on the 2010 EP In The Fall by Future Islands. She also appears on the song "Caged Bird" on the 2010 album Where Did the Night Fall by UNKLE.
