= Thee Black Boltz =

Studio album by Tunde Adebimpe
- Released: April 18, 2025
- Length: 35:15
- Label: Sub Pop
- Producer: Tunde Adebimpe; Brian Bender; Jahphet Landis; Wilder Zoby

Singles from Thee Black Boltz
- 1. "Magnetic" Released: October 29, 2024; 2. "Drop" Released: January 28, 2025; 3. "God Knows" Released: March 2, 2025; 4. "Somebody New" Released: April 15, 2025

Thee Black Boltz is the debut studio album by American musician and actor Tunde Adebimpe. It was released on April 18, 2025, by Sub Pop.

== Background ==
Adebimpe co-founded the musical group TV on the Radio in 2001. The group released five albums between 2004 and 2014, afterwards going on a lengthy hiatus.

The Black Boltz was recorded in a studio in Los Angeles, in collaboration with multi-instrumentalist Wilder Zoby, who also co-produced the album with Adebimpe. Consisting of eleven songs ranging between two and five minutes each, excluding the 30-second opening track, the album has a total runtime of thirty five minutes and fifteen seconds. The first single, "Drop", described as "propulsive and emotional bedroom-rocker built on a human-beatbox loop", was released on January 28, 2025. The second single, "Somebody New", was released on April 15, 2025, three days prior to the album's release.

== Reception ==
Professional ratings
Aggregate scores
Source	Rating
AnyDecentMusic?	7.7/10
Metacritic	80/100
Review scores
Source	Rating
AllMusic	4/5 stars
The AV Club	A−
Clash	8/10 stars
DIY	4/5 stars
The Line of Best Fit	8/10 stars
The London Standard	4/5 stars
The Observer	4/5 stars
Paste	8.1/10
Pitchfork	7.6/10

AllMusic's Heather Phares wrote in her review of the album that "On Thee Black Boltz, he distinguishes himself as a solo act while connecting to the broader strokes of his artistry." The London Standard gave the album a rating of four stars and commented, "On 'Somebody New' and 'God Knows', you have a sense of despair in the face of authoritarianism, and Thee Black Boltz are the flashes of lightening that Adebimpe is using to cut through it."

The Guardian gave the album four stars, calling it "a sparkling solo debut." In her review Kitty Empire stated "Everything about Adebimpe’s magnetic presence fronting of one of the most critically acclaimed bands of the 00s is present and correct on Thee Black Boltz: his warm fluency, wistful anger and genre versatility." She lauded lead single 'Magnetic', in particular, saying Adebimpe's "pop instincts have come to the fore on these 11 streamlined songs; witness Magnetic, one of the best things he’s ever done."

Pitchfork rated the album 7.6 out of ten and remarked, "The TV on the Radio singer sharpens his voice on his debut solo album, using bold synth melodies and driving beats as the backdrop to some of his most nuanced performances yet." The Line of Best Fit assigned it a rating of eight out of ten, stating "even though Thee Black Boltz may fall short in comparison with the band's best records, it still offers flashes of brilliance and maybe even some comfort if you're going through a difficult patch."

DIY Mag gave it four stars and described it as "a dispatch from the eye of a storm rattling with grief and political anxiety, yet the clouds part for sparks of hope." Clash stated, "It really spotlights his artistry and musical intelligence ranging from indie, electronic and folk," rating it eight out of ten. The Observer remarked, "Everything about Adebimpe's magnetic presence fronting of one of the most critically acclaimed bands of the 00s is present and correct on Thee Black Boltz: his warm fluency, wistful anger and genre versatility."

Paste scored it 8.1 out of ten and wrote in its review of the album that "Adebimpe remains defiantly human on his debut album, meditating in the chaos of creativity and untethered by genre—still evolving; still electric." The AV Club gave the album a grade of "A−" and stated, "Adebimpe's debut solo LP, Thee Black Boltz, feels even more deliberate in its modesty—none of its 11 songs reach the kaleidoscopic color or maximalist production of vintage TV." The Wall Street Journal remarked, "For all its imperfections, Thee Black Boltz is rarely boring—Mr. Adebimpe's poetic sensibility and ear for distinctive melody keep things interesting even when a song has less force than it should, and the album is tight, focused and never drags."

== Track listing ==
All lyrics are written by Tunde Adebimpe.

Thee Black Boltz track listing
No.	Title	Music	Producer(s)	Length
1.	"Thee Black Boltz"	T. Adebimpe; Brian Bender; Wilder Zoby	T. Adebimpe; Bender; Zoby	0:36
2.	"Magnetic"	T. Adebimpe; Jaleel Bunton; Jahphet Landis; Zoby	T. Adebimpe; Zoby; Burton^{[c]}	2:30
3.	"Ate the Moon"	T. Adebimpe; Echo Adebimpe; Zoby	T. Adebimpe; Zoby	4:01
4.	"Pinstack"	T. Adebimpe; Bunton; Pat Lukens; Zoby	T. Adebimpe; Zoby; Burton^{[c]}	3:07
5.	"Drop"	T. Adebimpe; Bender; Alissia Benveniste; Landis; Mason Sacks	T. Adebimpe; Landis; Bender^{[a]}; Sacks^{[a]}	4:16
6.	"ILY"	T. Adebimpe; Zoby	T. Adebimpe; Zoby	2:53
7.	"The Most"	T. Adebimpe; Zoby	T. Adebimpe; Zoby	3:54
8.	"God Knows"	T. Adebimpe; Nicole Lawrence; Zoby	T. Adebimpe; Zoby	3:48
9.	"Blue"	T. Adebimpe; Guillermo Brown; Zoby	T. Adebimpe; Zoby	3:03
10.	"Somebody New"	T. Adebimpe; Zoby	T. Adebimpe; Zoby	2:58
11.	"Streetlight Nuevo"	T. Adebimpe; Miguel Atwood-Ferguson; Landis; Zoby	T. Adebimpe; Zoby	4:09

Notes

- ^{^[c]} signifies a co-producer.
- ^{^[a]} signifies an additional producer.

== Personnel ==
Credits adapted from Tidal.

- Tunde Adebimpe – vocals, artwork
- Heba Kadry – mastering
- Wilder Zoby – mixing (all tracks), engineering (tracks 2–11)
- Brian Bender – mixing (all tracks), engineering (tracks 1, 8)
- Jahphet Landis – mixing (track 5)
- Matty Green – engineering (track 5)
- Julian Gross – design
- Xaviera Simmons – photography

== Charts ==
Chart performance for Thee Black Boltz
Chart (2025)	Peak position
Scottish Albums (OCC)	65
UK Album Downloads (OCC)	35
UK Independent Albums (OCC)	20
