= Return to Cookie Mountain =

Second studio album by American rock band TV on the Radio

Studio album by TV on the Radio
- Released: July 3, 2006
- Recorded: 2005
- Studios: Stay Gold (Brooklyn, New York); Head Gear (Brooklyn, New York)
- Genres: Indie rock; psychedelia; post-rock; post-punk revival; shoegaze; space rock; experimental
- Length: 56:10
- Labels: Interscope; Touch and Go; 4AD
- Producer: David Andrew Sitek

TV on the Radio chronology
Desperate Youth, Blood Thirsty Babes (2004)	Return to Cookie Mountain (2006)	Live at Amoeba Music (2007)

Singles from Return to Cookie Mountain
- 1. "Wolf Like Me" Released: February 13, 2006; 2. "Province" Released: May 8, 2006

Return to Cookie Mountain is the second studio album by American rock band TV on the Radio. It was released July 3, 2006, worldwide by 4AD, and issued in the U.S. and Canada on September 12, 2006, by Interscope Records and Touch and Go Records. The North American release features three bonus tracks, two of which are B-sides from the single "Wolf Like Me"; the other is a remix of "Hours" by El-P. Videos were made for the singles "Wolf Like Me" and "Province".

The album featured several notable guest vocalists: "Province" features backing vocals from David Bowie, who championed the band's full-length debut, Desperate Youth, Blood Thirsty Babes; Katrina Ford of the band Celebration guests on "Wolf Like Me", "Let the Devil In" and "Blues from Down Here"; Kazu Makino of Blonde Redhead sings on "Hours". This is their first album to feature the keyboardist Gerard Smith.

Critical reviews were universally positive, with many proclaiming Return to Cookie Mountain one of the best albums of 2006 and best of the decade.

== Reception ==
Professional ratings
Aggregate scores
Source	Rating
Metacritic	88/100
Review scores
Source	Rating
AllMusic	5/5 stars
The A.V. Club	A
Entertainment Weekly	A−
The Guardian	4/5 stars
MSN Music (Consumer Guide)	A−
NME	9/10
Pitchfork	9.1/10
Q	4/5 stars
Rolling Stone	4.5/5 stars
Spin	4/5 stars

Return to Cookie Mountain earned overwhelmingly positive reviews from critics, and was named the album of the year by Spin for 2006, leading to the band's appearance on the magazine's cover. The album was ranked second on Pitchfork Media's list of Top 50 Albums of 2006. Rolling Stone, Slant Magazine, and Stylus Magazine each named the album as the fourth best of 2006, and the album is ranked fifth on Metacritic's year-end list. In 2009, Rhapsody ranked the album at eighth on its "100 Best Albums of the Decade" list. In December 2007 the album was ranked number 96 in Blender (magazine)'s 100 Greatest Indie-Rock Albums Ever.

On the occasion of Return to Cookie Mountain's tenth anniversary in 2016, Chris DeVille praised the album for Stereogum, describing it as "a thrill from start to finish. This was the album that established once and for all that TV On The Radio were more than just a great idea for a band; they were a great band, period."

As of 2014, sales in the United States have exceeded 242,000 copies, according to Nielsen SoundScan.

== Track listing ==
No.	Title	Writer(s)	Length
1.	"I Was a Lover"	Kyp Malone, Dave Sitek	4:21
2.	"Hours"	Tunde Adebimpe	3:55
3.	"Province"	Malone, Sitek	4:37
4.	"Playhouses"	Malone	5:11
5.	"Wolf Like Me"	Adebimpe	4:39
6.	"A Method"	Adebimpe	4:25
7.	"Let the Devil In"	Malone	4:27
8.	"Dirtywhirl"	Adebimpe	4:15
9.	"Blues from Down Here"	Malone	5:17
10.	"Tonight"	Adebimpe	6:53
11.	"Wash the Day"	Malone, Sitek, Adebimpe	8:08

US reissue bonus tracks
No.	Title	Writer(s)	Length
26.	"Untitled"		1:44
27.	"Snakes and Martyrs"	Malone	4:07
28.	"Hours" (El-P remix)	Adebimpe	4:26
29.	"Things You Can Do"	Adebimpe, Sitek	5:26

- Tracks 12 to 25 are untitled silent tracks. Track 12 runs for 0:16 while tracks 13 to 25 run for 0:17. Track 26 consists of ambient audio.

== Personnel ==
TV on the Radio

- Tunde Adebimpe – vocals (all tracks), percussion (6), choir (7)
- Jaleel Bunton – drums (1–5, 8, 9, 11), piano (2), guitar (2, 5, 10), percussion (6, 10), choir (7), Rhodes (8)
- Kyp Malone – vocals (1, 3–11), bass (5, 7), guitar (5, 7, 9)
- Dave Sitek – guitars (1, 3–5, 9, 11), bass (1, 3, 9), samples (1, 5–9), flute (2), sampler (3, 4), keys (3, 6), synth (5, 6, 8, 9, 11), magic (10)
- Gerard Smith – piano (1, 3), organ (2), bass (2, 8), choir (7), guitar (8), electric sitar (11)

Additional personnel

- Kazu Makino – vocals (2)
- Jeremy Wilms – cello (2)
- David Bowie – vocals (3)
- Omega "C Taylor" Moon – vocals (4)
- Katrina Ford – vocals (5, 7, 9)
- Martin Perna – baritone saxophone (5), horns (9)
- Aaron Aites – choir (7)
- Dragons of Zynth: Akwetey & Aku Orraca-Tetteh, Devang Arvind Shah – choir, percussion (7)
- Shanina Robinson – vocals (9)
- Stuart D. Bogie – bass harmonica, bass clarinet (9)
- Chris Taylor – horns (9), clarinet (10), horn arrangement (9)

== Charts ==
Chart performance for Return to Cookie Mountain
Chart (2006)	Peak position
Australian Albums (ARIA)	50
Belgian Albums (Ultratop Flanders)	52
Belgian Albums (Ultratop Wallonia)	55
French Albums (SNEP)	60
German Albums (Offizielle Top 100)	61
Italian Albums (FIMI)	44
Swedish Albums (Sverigetopplistan)	56
UK Albums (Official Charts)	90
US Billboard 200	41
