= Nine Types of Light =

Studio album by TV on the Radio
- Released: April 11, 2011
- Recorded: 2010
- Studio: Federal Prism (Glendale, California); Brooklyn Recording (Brooklyn, New York); Head Gear (Brooklyn, New York)
- Genre: Art rock; soul
- Length: 43:40
- Label: Interscope
- Producer: David Andrew Sitek

TV on the Radio chronology
Read Silence (2009)	Nine Types of Light (2011)	Seeds (2014)

Professional ratings
Aggregate scores
Source	Rating
AnyDecentMusic?	7.8/10
Metacritic	82/100
Review scores
Source	Rating
AllMusic	3.5/5 stars
The A.V. Club	A
Entertainment Weekly	B+
The Guardian	4/5 stars
Los Angeles Times	3.5/4 stars
MSN Music (Expert Witness)	A−
NME	8/10
Pitchfork	7.7/10
Rolling Stone	4/5 stars
Spin	8/10

Nine Types of Light is the fourth studio album by American rock band TV on the Radio, released on April 11, 2011, through Interscope Records. It is the final TV on the Radio album to feature bassist Gerard Smith, who died of lung cancer nine days after it was released. The album's lead single "Will Do" was released on February 23, 2011. Its closing track, "Caffeinated Consciousness", was made available on the band's website as a free download on March 10, 2011.

== Critical response ==
Nine Types of Light was very well received by critics and has a "Universal Acclaim" rating of 82 at review aggregating website Metacritic. The Quietus were effusive in their praise of the album and, in particular, Dave Sitek's role of producer noting his "skill as a handsome texturologist." They concluded: "Nine Types Of Light offers a far less opulent, more modest ecology when compared to their earlier work, but it speaks of a far more mature and realistic notion of love: based on caring, understanding, patience, soulful connection." Pitchfork opined that "Nine Types of Light shows how TV on the Radio's transmissions can be just as effective and affecting when delivered free of static and noise."

== Film ==
The band created an accompanying film to go with the album, an hourlong visual companion that offers music videos for all of Nine Types of Light's tracks. Packaged with a deluxe version of the CD, the film also exists on YouTube in its entirety. Characterized by eclectic visual style and thematic content as well as TV on the Radio's diverse, unique sound, the film allows for a different interpretation and method of experiencing the album. Directed by singer Tunde Adebimpe (with different directors helming the individual clips, see below for list), the film also features interviews with a variety of New Yorkers discussing topics including dreams, love, fame, and the future. A humorous epilogue, set to the song "You" and featuring the band members meeting for lunch ten years after a fictional breakup, concludes the film. Overall, the work can be seen as Afrofuturistic, particularly the video for "Will Do," which incorporates virtual-reality technology to tell a unique love story starring Adebimpe and Joy Bryant.

== Track listing ==
1. "Second Song" – 4:22
2. "Keep Your Heart" – 5:43
3. "You" – 4:05
4. "No Future Shock" – 4:03
5. "Killer Crane" – 6:15
6. "Will Do" – 3:46
7. "New Cannonball Blues" – 4:34
8. "Repetition" – 3:46
9. "Forgotten" – 3:40
10. "Caffeinated Consciousness" – 3:21

Deluxe version

11. "All Falls Down" – 4:55
12. "Will Do" (Switch Remix) – 5:20
13. "Will Do" (XXXChange Dancehall Mix) – 3:45

iTunes version

14. "Troubles" (bonus track) – 3:04

Film

1. "Caffeinated Consciousness" – dir. Tim Nackashi – 02:27
2. "Second Song" – dir. Michael Please – 05:46
3. "New Cannonball Blues" – dir. Maya Erdelyi – 11:05
4. "No Future Shock" – dir. Jon Moritsugu & Amy Davis – 15:11
5. "Repetition" – dir. Johnerick Lawson – 19:38
6. "Will Do" – dir. Dugan O'Neal – 24:48
7. "Keep Your Heart" – dir. Petro Papahadjopoulos – 28:29
8. "Forgotten" – dir. Tunde Adebimpe – 34:09
9. "Killer Crane" – dir. TV on the Radio & Dano Cerny – 39:26
10. "You" – dir. Barney Clay – 49:17
11. "Dragon Backwards" – dir. Tim Nackashi, Tunde Adebimpe & Jaleel Bunton – 59:09

== Personnel ==
TV on the Radio

- Tunde Adebimpe – vocals, loops, keyboards
- Jaleel Bunton – drums, bass guitar, guitar, programming, organ, synthesizer, vocals
- Kyp Malone – vocals, guitar, bass guitar, synthesizer, clarinet, flute, viola
- David Andrew Sitek – programming, synthesizer, guitar, bass guitar, samples, vocals
- Gerard A. Smith – bass guitar, organ, samples, synthesizer, vocals

Additional musicians

- Priscilla Ahn – background vocals
- Stuart Bogie – horn
- Peter Hess – horn
- Dan Huron – percussion
- Michael Irwin – horn
- Kevin Moehringer – horn
- Gillian Rivers – strings
- Todd Simon – horn
- Kenny Wang – strings (viola)
- Lauren Weaver – strings

Production

- Jaleel Bunton – programming
- Rich Costey – mixing
- Steve Fallone – mastering
- David Andrew Sitek – producer, programming
- Zeph Sowers – engineer

Design

- Tunde Adebimpe – art direction, designer
- David Andrew Sitek – art direction, designer, photographer
- Nick Walker – assistant photographer

== Charts ==
Chart performance for Nine Types of Light
Chart (2011)	Peak position
Australian Albums (ARIA)	25
Belgian Albums (Ultratop Flanders)	51
Belgian Albums (Ultratop Wallonia)	68
Dutch Albums (Album Top 100)	82
French Albums (SNEP)	76
German Albums (Offizielle Top 100)	68
Irish Albums (IRMA)	33
New Zealand Albums (RMNZ)	39
Spanish Albums (PROMUSICAE)	46
Swiss Albums (Schweizer Hitparade)	65
UK Albums (OCC)	33
US Billboard 200	12
