= Seeds (TV on the Radio album) =

Studio album by TV on the Radio
- Released: November 18, 2014
- Recorded: 2013–2014
- Genre: Art rock; indie rock; electronica; synth-pop; art pop
- Length: 52:43
- Label: Harvest
- Producer: Dave Sitek

TV on the Radio chronology
Nine Types of Light (2011)	Seeds (2014)

Singles from Seeds
- 1. "Happy Idiot" Released: September 2, 2014

Seeds is the fifth studio album by American art rock band TV on the Radio, released on November 18, 2014, through Harvest Records. It is the band's first album since the 2011 death of their bassist, Gerard Smith.

The album's first single, "Happy Idiot", was released on September 2, 2014.

== Recording ==
Seeds was recorded in Los Angeles, at guitarist Dave Sitek's Federal Prism home studio. Sitek also produced the record. Lead singer Tunde Adebimpe explained, "It was nice to be somewhere where you're not exactly on the clock and worried about how much everything is costing you. It was pretty much the same situation as when we started making music."

== Release ==
The band announced the album on July 29, 2014. Adebimpe stated in a press release:

We've been through a lot of stuff in the past few years that could have stopped the band cold, but I'm glad we got it together and took stock of the unique connection we have between each other because the record is, 1,000 percent, without a doubt, the best thing we've ever done.

== Reception ==
Professional ratings
Aggregate scores
Source	Rating
AnyDecentMusic?	7.2/10
Metacritic	78/100
Review scores
Source	Rating
AllMusic	4/5 stars
The A.V. Club	C
Cuepoint (Expert Witness)	A−
Entertainment Weekly	A−
The Guardian	4/5 stars
NME	8/10
Pitchfork	7.2/10
Q	4/5 stars
Rolling Stone	3.5/5 stars
Spin	7/10

Seeds was positively received by most critics. At Metacritic, which assigns a normalized rating out of 100 to reviews from mainstream critics, the album received an average score of 78, based on 30 reviews, indicating "generally favorable reviews". Many reviewers commented on the album's shift in aesthetic from the band's past work, attributing it to the passing of long-time band member Gerard Smith. Heather Phares of AllMusic wrote that "Seeds has a palpable sense of moving on for TV on the Radio [...] with the band confronting loss directly on the album's first half and accepting it on the second." She found the album to be "a fine tribute to Smith and the sound of enduring unimaginable loss." Mark Beaumont of NME observed that "grief and anger are channelled into a propulsive energy, driving the quartet's synthetic pop explorations with added garage-rock urgency" and ultimately concluding that the band "have returned from an uncertain period sounding remarkably fresh." Ian Gormely of Exclaim! described it as a "sublime catharsis after the group's tragic loss and a perfect distillation of what the band do best".

== Track listing ==
No.	Title	Length
1.	"Quartz"	3:58
2.	"Careful You"	5:12
3.	"Could You"	4:01
4.	"Happy Idiot"	3:03
5.	"Test Pilot"	4:41
6.	"Love Stained"	4:20
7.	"Ride"	6:29
8.	"Right Now"	4:23
9.	"Winter"	3:41
10.	"Lazerray"	3:37
11.	"Trouble"	4:34
12.	"Seeds"	4:44
Total length:		54:13

Vinyl edition/Japan CD bonus tracks
No.	Title	Length
13.	"Nobody Else"	3:19
14.	"Mystery Eyes"	5:21

== Charts ==
Chart performance for Seeds
Chart (2014)	Peak position
Australian Albums (ARIA)	42
Belgian Albums (Ultratop Flanders)	100
Belgian Albums (Ultratop Wallonia)	120
French Albums (SNEP)	159
Swiss Albums (Schweizer Hitparade)	73
UK Albums (OCC)	78
US Billboard 200	22
