= Young Liars =

EP by TV on the Radio
- Released: July 8, 2003
- Genre: Art rock
- Length: 25:13
- Label: Touch and Go

TV on the Radio chronology
| OK Calculator (2002) | Young Liars (2003) | Desperate Youth, Blood Thirsty Babes (2004) |

Professional ratings
Review scores
| Source | Rating |
|---|---|
| AllMusic | 4/5 stars |
| Pitchfork Media | 8.9/10 |

Young Liars is the first major release by the New York City band TV on the Radio. Released in 2003 on Touch & Go Records, the EP helped establish the band's distinctive blending of electronica, doo wop, post-rock, and avant-garde styles. The release featured the single "Staring at the Sun," which would later be remixed and reissued in their full-length album Desperate Youth, Blood Thirsty Babes. It ends with an unlisted fifth track which is an a cappella version of the Pixies song "Mr. Grieves" (originally on their 1989 album Doolittle).

== Track listing ==
1. "Satellite" – 4:33 (T. Adebimpe & D. Sitek)
2. "Staring at the Sun" – 4:01 (T. Adebimpe & D. Sitek)
3. "Blind" – 7:15 (T. Adebimpe & D. Sitek)
4. "Young Liars" – 5:12 (T. Adebimpe & D. Sitek)

"Mr. Grieves" – 4:10 (unlisted bonus track) (Black Francis)

== Charts ==
| Chart (2011) | Peak position |
|---|---|
| UK Physical Singles Chart (Official Charts Company) | 85 |
