= Stuart Bogie =

American multi-instrumentalist

- Born: Stuart D. Bogie
- Origin: Evanston, Illinois
- Genres: Indie Rock; jazz; reggae; funk; afrobeat
- Occupations: Composer; producer; arranger
- Instruments: Saxophone; clarinet
- Years active: 1995-present
- Labels: Royal Potato Family; Yeggs; Mighty Eye; Daptone; Anti-; DFA; Historical Fiction; Mutual Music
- Website: https://www.stuart-bogie.com/

Stuart D. Bogie is an American multi-instrumentalist, composer, arranger, and music producer. Originally from Evanston, Illinois, Bogie became a staple in the Brooklyn music scene.

== Early years ==
Bogie studied music at the Interlochen Arts Academy and the University of Michigan, focusing on clarinet and bass clarinet. While in high school, he co-founded the group Transmission with Zachary Mastoon (aka Caural) in 1991. Later, Bogie would re-form Transmission with Colin Stetson, Eric Perney and Andrew Kitchen while at The U of M. After graduating in 1997, Bogie moved to San Francisco to pursue musical endeavors.

== Antibalas ==
In 2000, Bogie moved to New York City, where he met Jordan McLean and reunited with friend and mentor Michael Herbst of Antibalas, who recruited him to join the large jazz ensemble Fire of Space, led by McLean. Soon after, McLean and Herbst brought Bogie into Antibalas, where he functioned variously as conductor, tenor saxophonist, and composer, touring to over 15 countries and performing in major festivals around the world since. Bogie's song "Indictment" was released on Antibalas' Who Is This America, which garnered an 8.1 from Pitchfork Media. The favorable review notes the song "opens with a Superfly-echoing riff as spastic tenor sax man Stuart Bogie recites a litany of offenses committed by everyone from Donald Rumsfeld to "the game of baseball," in what sounds like some funky People's Court." The Village Voice called "Indictment," "...a fantastic Bush-era protest song, lithe and lethal."

Another Bogie composition for Antibalas, "Beaten Metal", was named as one of the top 100 songs of 2007 by Pitchfork Media, ahead of modern-day staples by MGMT and Broken Social Scene. Pitchfork writer Grayson Currin applauded the song, noting "quick splashes of colorful sound and some slowly building drama, "Beaten Metal" sounds brazen, rhythmic, and powerful—like Edgard Varese coming of age after hip-hop."

Bogie also composed "I.C.E." and the vocal parts (lyrics and melody) for "Sanctuary", which was released (along with "Beaten Metal" on the Antibalas album Security, produced by John McEntire. Bogie frequently conducted Antibalas between 2004 and 2012, when he formally left the group.

== Fela! ==
Along with many members of Antibalas, Bogie appeared and performed in the Broadway musical Fela! about Fela Kuti directed by Bill T. Jones produced by Steve Hendel and Music Directed by Aaron Johnson. He performed as the featured soloist, improvising several solos throughout the show. The New York Times wrote "music that gets into your bloodstream, setting off vibrations you’ll live with for days to come."

== Work with Dave Sitek ==
Bogie has a long history of working with producer Dave Sitek. In 2006, Bogie contributed bass harmonica, tenor sax, contra-bass clarinet to the critically acclaimed TV on the Radio album Return to Cookie Mountain, which Pitchfork Media named the #2 best album of 2006.

In 2008, Bogie was recruited to contribute tenor and baritone saxophone and collaborate on horn arrangements for TV on the Radio's Dear Science. Following the release of the acclaimed record, Bogie toured extensively with TVOTR across Europe and North America making television appearances including The Tonight Show with Jay Leno, Late Show with David Letterman, Saturday Night Live and The Colbert Report.

Aside from contributing horns to the last two TVOTR records, Bogie also played saxophone on the Yeah Yeah Yeahs It's Blitz!, produced by Dave Sitek, where his work can be heard on "Zero", "Dragon Queen", and "Hysteric". He has also worked with Sitek on tracks by Zack de la Rocha, Holly Miranda's The Magician's Private Library, Massive Attack, Wale, Foals, Get Hustle, Pink Noise Telepathe and Scarlett Johansson's album of Tom Waits covers, Anywhere I Lay My Head.

== Superhuman Happiness ==
Superhuman Happiness was founded in 2008 by Bogie and includes a long roster of artists from New York. Eric Biondo, Andrea Diaz, Mathew Scheiner, Sam Levin, Luke O'Malley (guitar), Ryan Ferreira (guitar), Jared Samuel (keyboard), Eric Biondo (trumpet), Nikhil Yerawadekar (bass), Miles Arntzen (drums), Torbitt Schwartz, Jeremy Wilms, Ryan Sawyer, Gunnar Olsen, John Bolinger, Ian Chang, Grey McMurray, Tim Allen.

The group's first release was Fall Down Seven Times Stand Up Eight, which featured contributions from O'Malley, Biondo, Ferreira, Brian Chase on Drums, Jeremiah Lockwood on Guitar, Jordan McLean and Eli Asher on Trumpet, Gabe Roth, Chris Vatolaro, and longtime collaborator Zak Mastoon. The self-released record was mixed by Hernan Santiago, mastered by Steve Berson and features art and design by Tatiana McCabe, and production by Bogie and Mastoon. The single "Human Happiness" was released by Electric Cowbell on a split 7-inch with CSC Funk Band.

Through the musical Fela! Bogie's relationship with lead actor, Sahr Ngaujah, led to a collaboration between Ngaujah and Superhuman Happiness resulting in two recordings, "Gravity" and "String Theory" released on 7-inch by Electric Cowbell records.

The group's second release "The Physical EP" focused more towards lyrical songwriting and was primarily recorded at Dave Sitek's Brooklyn studio "Stay Gold" by Daniel Huron. The record was mixed by Huron and O'Malley, and produced by Bogie and O'Malley. It was released on Royal Potato Family in 2011. The songs "GMYL" and "Hounds" were released as a 7-inch on Electric Cowbell, the songs "Needles and Pins" and "Oh, Tatiana" were released on 7-inch through Royal Potato Family.

The group's third release Hands (2013) focused on collaborative song writing, and was collectively composed through the use of clapping patterns to generate material. The core musicians on Hands were Luke O'Malley, Ryan Ferreira, Eric Biondo, Nikhil Yerawadekar, Jared Samuel and Miles Arntzen. The album featured lead vocal performances by several different members of the group. The singles "See Me On My Way" and "Sentimental Pieces" were released on 7-inch. Both the LP and 7-inch were released by Royal Potato Family. The album and 7-inch feature art by Joao Machado. Colin Stetson, Abena Koomson, Afi McLendon, Kalmia Traver, Joci Adams, and Shaneeka Harrel also performed on the record.

The group has collaborated with video artist Tatiana McCabe on "GMYL," "Mr. Mystery," "Sentimental Pieces," "Hounds," "Needles and Pins," "Second Heart," as well as several live video collaborations.

Their latest release, Escape Velocity, was released in September 2015. AllMusic noted that the album was "Marking a new focus more than a new sound for the group, Escape Velocity's interplay of ruminative tone and unbridled infectiousness works like a charm, compelling not only moving feet but repeat plays".

== The Bogie Band feat. Joe Russo ==
The Bogie Band feat. Joe Russo is a new collaboration between long time friends Joe Russo and Bogie. The group features nine musicians playing wind and percussion instruments. The dynamic arrangements are built on the flowing propulsion of Russo’s drumming alternating through transcendental minimalism, raucous humor, and a revelatory joy that draws on each of the 9 musicians ability to creatively solo and contribute to the rhythmic mass of the ensemble. The group released one song, Headrush Pt. 1, and made their live debut in January 2020 at the Winter Jazz Fest in New York. Their first record,The Prophets in the City will be released on the label Royal Potato Family.

== Producer ==
Aside from contributing to countless acts, Bogie has also produced records by Volney Litmus and Jeremiah Lockwood. In addition, he has also produced tracks for the films Lo and Behold and Invisible Girlfriend.

== Awards ==
He has been the recipient of a Meet the Composer grant, and has written, produced and performed music for film, dance, television, and toys, for which he played alongside Elmo. Bogie also played on Angélique Kidjo's album Djin Djin, which received a Grammy for best contemporary world music album.

== Notable collaborations ==
He has shared stage and/or studio with the Arcade Fire, Iron and Wine, Wu-Tang Clan, Medeski Martin & Wood, Public Enemy, Celebration, The Roots, Paul Simon, Harlem Shakes, Burning Spear, Zack de la Rocha, Massive Attack, Scarlett Johansson, Mark Ronson, Saul Williams, Passion Pit, Tony Allen, Sinéad O'Connor, Sharon Jones & The Dap-Kings, Joe Russo's Almost Dead, The El Michaels Affair, Baaba Maal, Bat for Lashes, DJ Logic, Brian Jackson, Yeah Yeah Yeahs, Rana, Dub is a Weapon, Congo Ashanti Roy, Kologbo, Tunde WIlliams, Ticklah, Paul Cox, Renata, Colin Stetson, Foals, Matt Bauder, Matthew Lux, Toby Summerfield, Great Lakes Myth Society, minusbaby, Crush, Kill, Destroy, Fire of Space, The Eternal Buzz Brass Band, Geoff Mann, Recloose, Evan Hause, Reverend Vince Anderson, Chin Chin, The Sharp Things, The Fu Arkist-Ra, Dick Griffin (of Sun Ra's Arkestra), Vincent Chancey, Steve Swell, Joe McGinty, Tom Abs, Shoko Nagai, Jeremy Wilms, Larry MacDonald, Butch Morris, Bill Brovold and Larval, Caural, Victor Rice, Dragons of Zynth, Loser's Lounge, State Radio, Gomez, Brightblack Morning Light, Holly Miranda, Noba, Miles Anthony Benjamin Robinson, Centralia, Wild Yaks, Oren Blowedow, Michael Leonhart and The Get Hustle.

He has also arranged strings for Spencer Day, James Harries and Ben Jonas.

== Discography ==
Year	Album	Artist	Credit
2025	Everything Must Go	Goose	Saxophone, Flute
2023	College Park	Logic	Saxophone, Flute, Clarinet, Bass Clarinet
2022	All Things Heavy	Mynolia	Flute, Tenor Saxophone
2022	A Legacy of Rentals	Craig Finn	Tenor Saxophone
2022	Dripfield	Goose	Tenor Saxophone, Baritone Saxophone
2022	The Night Shift	Dutch Williams	Clarinet, Bass Clarinet, Flute
2022	Sentimental Fool	Lee Fields	Bass Harmonica
2022	Pigments	Dawn Richard and Spencer Zahn	Clarinet, Bass Clarinet
2022	Magic Hour	Surf Curse	Tenor Saxophone
2022	For The Birds Vol 3	Randall Poster	Clarinet, Bass Clarinet
2022	Slow Fawn	Sam Cohen	Clarinet, Tenor Saxophone, Flute, Bass Harmonica, Piano
2021	Woyaya	Anais Mitchell and This Is The Kit	Flute
2021	Antelope Running	Jesse Marchant	Clarinet, Bass Clarinet
2021	Clarinet Concert For You Vol. 4	Stuart Bogie	Clarinet
2021	Clarinet Concert For You Vol. 3	Stuart Bogie	Clarinet
2021	Open Door Policy	The Hold Steady	Horns
2021	If Words Were Flowers	Curtis Harding	Bass Clarinet, Tenor Saxophone
2021	Detritus	Sarah Neufeld	Flute, Saxophone, Arrangement
2021	Quietly Blowing It	Hiss Golden Messenger	Tenor Saxophone, Arrangement
2021	What The Flood Leaves Behind	Amy Helm	Tenor Saxophone
2021	La Historia	Santiago Salazar	
2021	An Overview on Phenomenal Nature	Cassandra Jenkins	Flutes, Saxophone
2021	The Daptone Super Soul Revue Live! At The Apollo	Antibalas	Tenor Saxophone
2021	The Nest (Original Motion Picture Soundtrack)	Richard Reed Parry	Contra-Alto Clarinet, Clarinet, Flute
2020	Clarinet Concert For You Vol. 2	Stuart Bogie	Clarinet
2020	Animaniacs Reboot		Clarinet, Bass Clarinet
2020	Headrush Pt. 1	The Bogie Band feat Joe Russo	Composer, Producer, Tenor Saxophone, Percussion
2020	PA System	Pittsburgh Track Authority	Tenor Saxophone
2020	Run the Jewels 4	Run the Jewels	Tenor Saxophone
2020	Fu Chronicles	Antibalas	Backing Vocals
2020	Common Prayers	Walter Martin	Saxophone
2020	Evermore	Taylor Swift	Alto Clarinet, Contrabass Clarinet, Flute, Recorded By
2020	In America	Victor Rice	Alto Saxophone
2020	Generations	Will Butler	Woodwind Arrangements
2020	Quarantine Boogie (Loco)	Walter Martin	Horns, Horn Arrangement
2020	Clarinet Concerts For You Vol. 1	Stuart Bogie	Clarinet
	Lacuna Revisited	Trixie Whitley	
2020	The World At Night	Walter Martin	Baritone Saxophone, Clarinet, Flute, Contra-Alto Clarinet, Jew's Harp
2020	Muzz	Muzz	Tenor Saxophone, Flute, Clarinet
2020	Live @ Cafe Carlyle	Hamilton Leithauser	Saxophone, Bass Harmonica, Clarinet, Flute
2020	The Music Of Red Dead Redemption II (Original Score)	Various Artists	Harmonica
2020	Greens Beans & Tangerines	Walter Martin	Flute, Saxophone
2020	The Loves Of Your Life	Hamilton Leithauser	Tenor Saxophone
2020	phér boney	Joe Russo	Contra-Alto Clarinet, Clarinet, Tenor Saxophone
2019	Missing Link (Original Motion Picture Soundtrack)	Walter Martin	
2019	Quiet River of Dust Vol. 2	Richard Reed Parry	Clarinet, Saxophone
2019	The Long Rally With Scott McDowell Present Jazz Realities	Various	
2019	Careful You	AJ Lambert	Clarinet, Saxophone
2019	Run Fast Sleep Naked	Nick Murphy	
2019	The Last Time That She Talked To Me	The Hold Steady	Performer
2019	Oh My God	Kevin Morby	Saxophone
2019	Thrashing Thru The Passion	The Hold Steady	Horn
2019	I Need A New War	Craig Finn	Saxophone, Clarinet, Flute
2019	Lacuna	Trixie Whitley	Alto Saxophone, Clarinet
2019	Silences	Adia Victoria	Clarinet, Saxophone, Flute, Harp
2019	Lost Souls of Saturn	Lost Souls of Saturn	Tenor Saxophone
2019	Speed Queen	Little Scream	Tenor Saxophone
2019	Soul Fugue	1000 Knights Orchestra	Tenor Saxophone
2018	Beacon	Superhuman Happiness	Writer, Performer, Producer
2018	Confusion In The Marketplace b/w T-Shirt Tux	The Hold Steady	Performer
2018	The Stove & The Toaster b/w Star 18	The Hold Steady	Performer
2018	Eureka b/w Esther	The Hold Steady	Performer
2018	Dream On Me	Toby Goodshank	Producer, Saxophone
2018	Bogie/Kaufman/Mann, Vol. 1	Bogie Kaufman Mann	Clarinet, Tenor Saxophone, Flute
2018	Quiet River of Dust Vol. 1	Richard Reed Perry	Saxophone, Flute, Clarinet
2018	The Cold Equations - Original Motion Picture Soundtrack	Josh Urist	Producer, Composer, Arranger
2018	137 Avenue Kaniama	Baloji	Composer, Producer, Tenor Saxophone
2018	Superhuman Happiness	Beacon	Writer, Performer, Producer
2018	Peter Pan (Equiknoxx Music Remix)	Arcade Fire Feat. Bobby Blackbird	Flute, Saxophone
2017	Semicircle	The Go! Team	Composer
2017	Resistance Radio: A Man In The High Castle	Various Artists	Tenor Saxophone
2017	Rags EP	Earthgang	Tenor Saxophone
2017	Entitlement Crew b/w A Snake In The Shower	The Hold Steady	Tenor Saxophone
2017	Everything Now	Arcade Fire	Flute
2017	Valentina Original Soundtrack	Stuart Bogie	Composer, Producer, Synths
2017	Trophic Cascade	Matthew O'Neill	Tenor Saxophone, Baritone Saxophone, Contrabass Clarinet
2017	Signs of Life	Arcade Fire	Saxophone
2017	We All Want The Same Things	Craig Finn	Saxophone, Clarinet, Flute
2017	Preludes	Craig Finn	Flute
2016	Singular Forms	Caural	Bass Clarinet
2016	Mangy Love	Cass McCombs	Horn, Flute, Jew's Harp (Jaw Harp)
2015	Escape Velocity	Superhuman Happiness	Composer, Producer, Vocals, Woodwinds, Synths, Percussion
2015	White Mirror	Boy King Islands	Alto Saxophone, Flute, Handclaps, Bass Harmonica, Jew's Harp, Clarinet
2015	I Don't Want to Let You Down	Sharon Van Etten	Horns, Jew's Harp (Mouth Harp)
2015	Policy	Will Butler	Saxophone Arrangement, Tenor Saxophone
2015	Faith In The Future	Craig Finn	Horn Arrangement
2015	GO:OD AM	Mac Miller	Tenor Saxophone
2015	Africa Calling	The Holy Forest	Tenor Saxophone
2014	Red Hot + Bach	Stuart Bogie, Grey McMurray	Producer, Composer, Arranger
2014	Eve	Angélique Kidjo	Saxophone
2014	Passerby	Luluc	Saxophone
2014	Clever Devil	Invisible Familiars	Saxophone
2014	Are We There	Sharon Van Etten	Woodwinds
2014	Disturbing Wildlife	Invisible Familiars	Baritone Saxophone, Tenor Saxophone, Bass Harmonica, Backing Vocals
2014	When Will Today Be Tomorrow	Gunnar Olsen	Saxophone
2013	B-Room	Dr. Dog	Tenor Saxophone
2013	Hands	Superhuman Happiness	Composer, Engineer, Group Member, Producer
2013	Red Hot + Fela	Kronos Quartet, Tunde Adebimpe, Kyp Malone, Nneka, Superhuman Happiness, Sinkane, Mikey Freedom Hart, Amayo	Arranger, Primary Artist, Producer, Programming, Saxophone, Whistle
2013	Reflektor	Arcade Fire	Saxophone, Horn Co-Arrangement (with Colin Stetson)
2013	La Bande-Son	Various Artists	Saxophone
2012	Folilla	Amadou & Mariam	Tenor Saxophone, Horn Arrangement, Writer
2012	Antibalas	Antibalas	Group Member, Tenor Saxophone
2012	Love this Giant	David Byrne & St. Vincent	Saxophone
2012	Out of the Game	Rufus Wainwright	Tenor Saxophone
2012	TigerFace	Marco Benevento	Saxophone, Background Vocals
2012	Two Sides of George	Iron & Wine	Tenor Saxophone, Clarinet, Bass Harmonica
2011	World of Funk	Shawn Lee's Ping Pong Orchestra	Tenor Saxophone
2011	28,000 Days	Gojogo	Flute, Tenor Saxophone
2011	Blow Wind Blow	The Blam	Saxophone
2011	Rat Race EP	Antibalas	Tenor Saxophone
2011	Collider	Sam Roberts	Woodwinds
2011	Kiss Each Other Clean	Iron & Wine	Performer
2011	Last Night on Earth	Elysian Fields	Tenor Saxophone
2011	Nine Types of Light	TV on the Radio	Saxophone
2011	Red Hot + Rio 2	Various Artists	Arranger, Percussion, Producer, Saxophone
2011	Rolling Blackouts	The Go! Team	Composer
2011	Smooth Jazz #1 Hits, compilation featuring Spencer Day's Til You Come to Me	Spencer Day	String Arrangement
2011	The House of Friendly Ghosts, Vol. I	The Sway Machinery	Engineer, Group Member, Tenor Saxophone
2011	The Physical EP	Superhuman Happiness	Bass Harmonica, Bells, Clarinet, Drum Programming, Engineer, Flute, Horn Arrangements, Mixing, Percussion, Producer, Sampling, Tenor Saxophone, Toy Guitar, Vibraphone, Vocals, Whistle
2011	Whatever's on Your Mind	Gomez	Bass Harmonica, Clarinet, Flute, Saxophone
2011	Ximena Sariñana	Ximena Sariñana	Saxophone
2011	Gold Tone	Beyondo	Clarinet
2010	Triggers	Sub Swara	Horns
2010	Human Happiness / A Troll's Soirée	Superhuman Happiness / CSC Funk Band	Percussion, Producer, Tenor Saxophone, Writer
2010	Earthology	Whitefield Brothers	Clarinet
2010	Fela! Original Broadway Cast Album	Fela Anikulapo-Kuti	Percussion, Tenor Saxophone
2010	Fossils and other Phantoms	Peggy Sue	Saxophone
2010	Maximum Ballroom	Maximum Ballroom	Saxophone
2010	Odd Blood	Yeasayer	Bass Harmonica, Saxophone, Jawharp
2010	Seahorse and the Storyteller	Michael Leonhart	Bass Harmonica, Clarinet, Contra-Alto Clarinet, Baritone Saxophone, Tenor Saxophone
2010	The Magician's Private Library	Holy Miranda	Tenor Saxophone, Horn Arrangement
2010	Õÿö	Angélique Kidjo	Tenor Saxophone
2010	MC Chris Goes to Hell	mc chris	Horns
2009	Daptone Gold	Various Artists	Tenor Saxophone
2009	A New Tide	Gomez	Bass Harmonica, Clarinet, Contralto Clarinet, Alto Saxophone
2009	Dance Mother	Telepathe	Saxophone
2009	Dark Was the Night: Red Hot Compilation	Various Artists	Mellotron, Tom-Tom, Vibraphone, Tenor Saxophone, Co-Production, Arrangement
2009	Hidden Melodies Revealed	The Sway Machinery	Group Member, Tenor Saxophone, Tambourine
2009	Insurgentes	Steven Wilson	Sax (Tenor)
2009	Rob I Land	Rob Symeonn And Ticklah	Saxophone
2009	It's Blitz!	Yeah Yeah Yeahs	Baritone Saxophone, Tenor Saxophone
2009	Manners	Passion Pit	Tenor Saxophone
2009	Rings	Sean Bones	Flute, Tenor Saxophone
2009	Summer of Fear	Miles Benamin Anthony Robinson	Clarinet, Jawharp, Tenor Saxophone
2009	Technicolor Health	Harlem Shakes	Bass Harmonica, Baritone Saxophone, Tenor Saxophone
2009	The Flashing, the Fancing	Chin Chin	Tenor Saxophone
2009	Vapours	Islands	Tenor Saxophone
2009	Fall Down Seven Times Stand Up Eight	Stuart Bogie	Clapping, Clarinet, Bass Clarinet, Composer, Engineer, Percussion, Primary Artist, Producer, Tenor Saxophone, Synthesizer, Vocals
2008	All is Golden	Pronto	Tenor Saxophone
2008	Antidotes	Foals	Saxophone
2008	Anywhere I lay My Head	Scarlett Johansson	Bass Harmonica, Saxophone
2008	Dear Science	TV on the Radio	Horn Arrangements, Tenor Saxophone, Baritone Saxophone
2008	Motion to Rejoin	Brightback Morning Light	Clarinet, Tenor Saxophone, Bass Harmonica
2008	Politics for Kids	Thought	Tenor Saxophone
2008	The Sway Machinery	The Sway Machinery	Member of Attributed Artist, Tenor Saxophone
2008	The Truth About Suffering	Jamie Leonhart	Clarinet (Contra - Alto)
2008	The Lovely Ugly Truth	Darrin James Band	Clarinet, Horn Arrangements, Alto Saxophone, Baritone Saxophone, Tenor Saxophone
2007	Mustache	FunkeyMonkeys!	Producer, Composer, Clarinet, Saxophone
2007	Tasted By Chemists	Grimace Federation	Tenor Saxophone
2007	Toot D'Amore	Chin Chin	Tenor Saxophone
2007	A Moveable Feast	The Sharp Things	Tenor Saxophone
2007	Chin Chin	Chin Chin	Tenor Saxophone
2007	Coronation Thieves	Dragons of Zynth	Saxophone
2007	Days Like These	James Harries	Clarinet, Harmonica, String Arrangements
2007	Djin Djin	Angélique Kidjo	Tenor Saxophone
2007	Introducing White Blue & Yellow Clouds	White Blue & Yellow Clouds	Bass Harmonica, Harmonica, Harp, Member of Attributed Artist
2007	Security	Antibalas	Composer, Metal Percussion, Co-Producer, Tenor Saxophone, Synthesizer
2007	Surviving Death/Alive Why?	Bill Brovold	Composer, Reeds
2007	The Modern Tribe	Celebration	Additional Personnel, Choir/Chorus, Bass Clarinet, Horn Arrangements, Tenor Saxophone, Vocals
2007	Armed & Dangerous	Dub Is A Weapon	Saxophone
2007	Prescilla	Bat For Lashes	Saxophone
2006	The Information	Beck	Tenor Saxophone
2006	American Primitive	Jeremiah Lockwood	Audio Engineer, Audio Production, Bass Harmonica, Bass Instrument, Composer, Engineer, Guitar, Harmonica, Main Personnel, Mixing, Producer, Saxophone, Vocals
2006	Handbasket	Fire of Space	Clarinet, Contra-Alto Clarinet
2006	Mirrors for Eyes	Caural	Additional Personnel, Tenor Saxophone
2006	Note Bleu: The Best of the Blue Note Years 1998-2005	Medeski, Martin & Wood	Alto Clarinet, Contra-Alto Clarinet, Member of Attributed Artist, Tenor Saxophone
2006	Return to Cookie Mountain	TV on the Radio	Bass Clarinet, Tenor Saxophone
2006	Zen of Logic	DJ Logic	Tenor Saxophone
2006	The PJs... From Afar	Raekwon & El Michels Affair	Bass Clarinet
2005	Celebration	Celebration	Clarinet, Tenor Saxophone
2005	Gilles Peterson in Africa	Gilles Peterson	Composer, Tenor Saxophone
2005	Great Lakes Myth Society	Great Lakes Myth Society	Tenor Saxophone
2005	Government Magic	Antibalas	Alto Saxophone
2005	Naturally	Sharon Jones & the Dap Kings	Jawharp
2005	Remembering Today	Caural	Clarinet
2005	Tastes Like Chicken	Funkeymonkeys	Bass Harmonica, Composer, Jawharp, Co-Producer, Saxophone, Vocals
2004	Sing Dance and Underpants	Funkeymonkeys!	Composer, Percussion, Flutes, Jawharps
2004	Who is This America?	Antibalas	Composer, Group Member, Member of Attributed Artist, Tenor Saxophone
2004	Nothing is Impossible	Dubtribe Sound System	Saxophone, Horn Arrangement
2004	Nervous Like Me	The Dapkings	Tenor Saxophone
2003	Age of Epoch	Fire of Space	Clarinet, Bass Clarinet
2003	Cool Rock	Chris Lee	Tenor Saxophone
2003	Conduction 117	The Jump Arts Orchestra Conducted by Lawrence "Butch" Morris	Contra-Alto Clarinet
2002	Red Hot + Riot: The Music and Spirit of Fela Kuti	Various Artists	Tenor Saxophone
2002	Talkatif	Antibalas	Alto Saxophone
2002	Uninvisible	Medeski, Martin & Wood	Alto Clarinet, Contra-Alto Clarinet, Tenor Saxophone
2001	Nebes Seben	Egyptian Brain Surgery	Vocals, Sampler, Producer, Clarinet
2001	Afrobeat Disciples (1st Kung Fu Lesson of Life)	Amayo's Fu-Arkist-Ra	Alto Saxophone
1999	Transmission	Transmission	Clarinet, Bass Clarinet, Composer, Group Member
1998	Reproductive Rights for All Women	Arwulf Arwulf	Clarinet, Bass Clarinet
1997	Closer to Mars	Transmission	Clarinet, Vocals
1997	This is Home Entertainment, Vol. 3	Recloose	Bass Clarinet
1995	You're The King	Transmission	Clarinet, Cowbell
