= Desperate Youth, Blood Thirsty Babes =

Studio album by TV on the Radio
- Released: March 9, 2004
- Recorded: August–September 2003
- Studios: Headgear Studio, Brooklyn
- Genres: Avant-pop; dark wave; experimental; post-punk
- Length: 47:04
- Labels: Touch and Go, 4AD
- Producer: David Andrew Sitek

TV on the Radio chronology
| Young Liars (2003) | Desperate Youth, Blood Thirsty Babes (2004) | Return to Cookie Mountain (2006) |

Singles from Desperate Youth, Blood Thirsty Babes
- 1. "Staring at the Sun" Released: June 28, 2004

Professional ratings
Aggregate scores
| Source | Rating |
|---|---|
| Metacritic | 79/100 |
Review scores
| Source | Rating |
| AllMusic | 4/5 stars |
| Blender | 4/5 stars |
| Entertainment Weekly | A |
| NME | 8/10 |
| The Observer | 3/5 stars |
| Pitchfork | 7.8/10 (2004); 9.2/10 (2024) |
| Q | 3/5 stars |
| Rolling Stone | 3.5/5 stars |
| Uncut | 4/5 stars |
| The Village Voice | B |

Desperate Youth, Blood Thirsty Babes is the 2004 debut album by the American art rock band TV on the Radio. The album was recorded at Headgear Studio in Brooklyn. It was awarded the Shortlist Music Prize for 2004. It was released on CD, 12" vinyl and MP3 download formats. The CD is enhanced with two different quality QuickTime video files of the "Dreams" music video. The 12" features two records with the extra song "You Could Be Love" and a different track order from the CD. The MP3 version includes two extra songs not available on the CD. "Staring at the Sun" has the intro edited from the original version on Young Liars, and is the same version used on the single and video. In 2024, the band and Touch and Go Records commemorated the album's 20th anniversary by re-releasing it as a two-LP set and Bandcamp download, both with bonus tracks.

As of 2009, sales in the United States have exceeded 116,000 copies, according to Nielsen SoundScan.

== Legacy ==
The album was included in the book 1001 Albums You Must Hear Before You Die. In 2026, Pitchfork ranked this album #20 on its list of The 100 Best Indie Rock Albums of All Time.

== Track listing ==
Original release

1. "The Wrong Way" – 4:38
2. "Staring at the Sun" – 3:27
3. "Dreams" – 5:09
4. "King Eternal" – 4:28
5. "Ambulance" – 4:55
6. "Poppy" – 6:07
7. "Don't Love You" – 5:31
8. "Bomb Yourself" – 5:32
9. "Wear You Out" – 7:22

Track on the vinyl and MP3 versions

10. "You Could Be Love"

(The vinyl LP release moves "Staring" to side three, before "You Could Be Love." Side four is an etching.)
Track on the MP3 version

11. "Staring at the Sun" (demo)

20th Anniversary Reissue

1. "The Wrong Way" – 4:38
2. "Dreams" – 5:09
3. "King Eternal" – 4:27
4. "Ambulance" – 4:54
5. "Poppy" – 6:07
6. "Don't Love You" – 5:31
7. "Bomb Yourself" – 5:31
8. "Wear You Out" – 7:20
9. "Staring at the Sun" – 3:26
10. "You Could Be Love" - 7:16
11. "Staring at the Sun" (demo) - 6:13
12. "New Health Rock" - 4:01
13. "Modern Romance" - 4:09
14. "Final Fantasy" - 3:14
15. "Dry Drunk Emperor" - 6:47

12-13 are remastered, and originally from the "New Health Rock" single. 14 is a previously unreleased early demo of the song which became "Bomb Yourself." 15 was originally released as a free download in 2005.

== Personnel ==
- Tunde Adebimpe – vocals, loops
- Kyp Malone – vocals, guitars, loops
- David Andrew Sitek – music, guitars, keys, loops
- Martin Perna – alto saxophone, baritone saxophone, flutes

== Charts ==
Chart performance for Desperate Youth, Blood Thirsty Babes
| Chart (2004) | Peak position |
|---|---|
| French Albums (SNEP) | 190 |
