= Martín Perna =

American musician

- Born: 1975 (age 49–50); Philadelphia, Pennsylvania, USA
- Education: New York University, B.A.; University of Texas-Brownsville, M.Ed.,
- Occupation(s): educator, multidisciplinary artist
- Years active: 1996-
- Known for: Founder, Antibalas, Founding Member Dap-Kings, Founder, GO! Passport, Founder Ocote Soul Sounds

Martin Perna is an educator and multidisciplinary artist living in Berkeley, California.

== Music ==
Perna founded the musical groups Antibalas and Ocote Soul Sounds, and has written for and/or recorded with TV on the Radio, Santigold, Toro y Moi, Sharon Jones, Jovanotti, Scarlett Johansson, Baaba Maal, Angelique Kidjo, David Byrne, the Whitefield Brothers, the Daktaris, No Surrender, Apsci, Architecture in Helsinki, and many other groups.

In 2021 he received his first Grammy nomination for Best Global Music album for his co-production, arranging and performance work on the Antibalas album Fu Chronicles on Daptone Records.

In 2022, he composed and performed the soundtrack for the PBS American Masters documentary "Roberta" about singer Roberta Flack, directed by Antonino D'Ambrosio

== Multidisciplinary Art ==
He is author of the children's book BLACKOUT! about the 2003 Northeast Power blackout, published in 2006 by Magic Propaganda Mill and illustrated by New York Times best-selling illustrator Ricardo Cortés.

An apprentice of earth architecture master Nader Khalili Perna also practices superadobe architecture and has created works in Michoacán, Mexico, and Austin, Texas.

In 2018, in collaboration with poet Roger Reeves and members of Antibalas, he set to music works by student poets at Miami Edison High School and performed the works together with the students and members of Spam All Stars at the North Miami Beach Bandshell as part of the O Miami Poetry Festival.

In 2020, he performed the music for "Fourth of July", narrated by actor/spoken word artist Daveed Diggs, and written by Safia Elhillo, Danez Smith, Lauren Whitehead, W. Kamau Bell, Angel Nafis, Idris Goodwin, Pharoahe Monch, Camonghne Felix, and Nate Marshall, inspired by Frederick Douglass's historic speech "What to the Slave is the Fourth of July?"

In 2023 he collaborated with visual artist Courtney Desiree Morris on the performance art piece "Sopera de Yemaya: Bendición" as part of the "Remedios" show at C3A in Cordoba, Spain.

== Partial Discography ==
- Daktaris "Soul Explosion"
- Mike Jackson and the Soul Providers "Revenge of Mr. Mopoji" Desco
- Nino Nardini "Rotonde Musique"
- Lee Fields "Let's Get a Groove On" Daptone Records
- Sharon Jones and the Dap Kings "Dap Dippin'" Daptone Records
- Elvis Costello and The Roots "Walk Us Uptown" Chico Mann Antibalas rework.
- Santigold 99¢ Atlantic
- Toro y Moi "Mahal" Dead Oceans
- Mark Ronson Uptown Walk

=== with Antibalas ===
- Antibalas "Liberation Afrobeat Vol. 1" Ninja Tune
- Antibalas "Talkatif" 1" Ninja Tune
- Antibalas "Who Is This America"
- Antibalas "Government Magic"
- Antibalas "Security" <
- Antibalas "Antibalas" Daptone Records
- Antibalas "Where The Gods Are in Peace" Daptone Records
- Antibalas "Fu-Chronicles" Daptone Records

=== With TV on the Radio ===
- TV on the Radio "Satellite" 4AD
- TV on the Radio "Desperate Youth, Bloodthirsty Babes" 4AD
- TV on the Radio "Return to Cookie Mountain" Touch and Go Records / Interscope Records
- TV on the Radio "Dear Science," Interscope Records

=== With Ocote Soul Sounds and Adrian Quesada ===
- Ocote Soul Sounds and Adrian Quesada "El Niño y El Sol" ESL Music
- Ocote Soul Sounds and Adrian Quesada "The Alchemist Manifesto" ESL Music
- Ocote Soul Sounds "Coconut Rock" ESL Music
- Ocote Soul Sounds "Taurus"ESL Music
