= Dear Science =

Studio album by TV on the Radio
- Released: September 16, 2008
- Recorded: 2008
- Studios: Stay Gold (Brooklyn, New York)
- Genres: Indie rock; art rock; funk; soul; post-punk
- Length: 50:21
- Labels: Interscope; DGC; Touch and Go; 4AD
- Producer: David Andrew Sitek

TV on the Radio chronology
Live at Amoeba Music (2007)	Dear Science (2008)	Read Silence (2009)

Singles from Dear Science
- 1. "Golden Age" Released: August 26, 2008; 2. "Dancing Choose" Released: September 9, 2008

Dear Science is the third studio album by the band TV on the Radio. It was released on September 16, 2008, digitally through Touch and Go Records, with the physical release coming a week later through Interscope Records and DGC Records in North America and 4AD elsewhere.

As of 2012, sales in the United States have exceeded 203,000 copies, according to Nielsen SoundScan. In 2009, it was awarded a gold certification from the Independent Music Companies Association, which indicated sales of at least 100,000 copies throughout Europe.

== History ==
Dear Science was recorded in 2008 at the Stay Gold studio in Brooklyn, New York. Musically, the album has been described as indie rock, art rock, funk, soul, and post-punk. Kyp Malone said that the album's title came from "a note that Dave [Sitek] wrote in the studio that said,

"Dear Science, please start solving problems and curing diseases or shut the fuck up."

Despite the marketed release date of September 22–23, the album was available for download on the U.S. iTunes Store on September 16, 2008. The vinyl LP also comes with a free MP3 download coupon. Dear Science received near unanimous acclaim from critics and charted worldwide. In promotion of the album, TV on the Radio was interviewed on the February 9, 2009 episode of The Colbert Report, "Dancing Choose" was performed to end the show. The rock band Phish began covering "Golden Age" in 2009.

== Critical reception ==
Professional ratings
Aggregate scores
Source	Rating
Metacritic	88/100
Review scores
Source	Rating
AllMusic	4.5/5 stars
The A.V. Club	A−
Entertainment Weekly	A−
The Guardian	5/5 stars
Los Angeles Times	4/4 stars
MSN Music (Consumer Guide)	A
NME	8/10
Pitchfork	9.2/10
Rolling Stone	4/5 stars
Spin	4.5/5 stars

Dear Science received rave reviews from critics. At Metacritic, which assigns a normalized rating out of 100 to reviews from mainstream critics, the album received an average score of 88, which indicates "universal acclaim", based on 40 reviews. It was named the best album of 2008 by Rolling Stone, The Guardian, Spin, MTV, Entertainment Weekly, the Pitchfork's readers poll, and the Village Voice.

Pitchfork placed Dear Science at number 140 on their list of top 200 albums of the 2000s, and 6th on their "50 Best Albums of 2008" list. Rolling Stone named it the 48th best album of the decade. The album was also included in the book 1001 Albums You Must Hear Before You Die.

== Remix EP ==
In early 2009, a remix EP was announced for release on February 17, although it was delayed until April 14. Read Silence was released exclusively through iTunes and featured remixes of "Shout Me Out", "Red Dress", and "Stork & Owl" by Gang Gang Dance, Jneiro Jarel, and Glitch Mob.

== Track listing ==
Dear Science track listing
No.	Title	Writer(s)	Length
1.	"Halfway Home"	Adebimpe	5:31
2.	"Crying"	Malone, Bunton	4:10
3.	"Dancing Choose"	Adebimpe, Sitek	2:56
4.	"Stork & Owl"	Malone	4:01
5.	"Golden Age"	Malone, Sitek	4:11
6.	"Family Tree"	Adebimpe	5:33
7.	"Red Dress"	Malone, Sitek	4:25
8.	"Love Dog"	Adebimpe	5:36
9.	"Shout Me Out"	Adebimpe	4:15
10.	"DLZ"	Adebimpe	3:48
11.	"Lover's Day"	Malone	5:54

Bonus tracks
No.	Title	Writer(s)	Length
1.	"Make Love All Night Long"	Malone	3:30
2.	"Heroic Dose"		7:19
3.	"Dancing Choose" (Prefuse 73 remix)		3:47
4.	"Crying" (Telepathe remix)		4:30
5.	"Dogs of Light"		7:05

== Personnel ==
Personnel adapted from album liner notes.

Band

- Tunde Adebimpe – vocals
- Kyp Malone – vocals, guitars, bass guitar, synths, string arrangements
- David Andrew Sitek – programming, guitars, samples, bass, synths, horn arrangements
- Gerard A Smith – bass, organ, synths, samples, Rhodes
- Jaleel Bunton – drums, guitars, rhodes, organ, synth, bass, programming, string arrangements

Production

- David Andrew Sitek – production; mixing
- Dan Huron – engineering
- Chris Coady – additional engineering
- Chris Moore – additional engineering
- Matty Green – mixing
- Mark Stent – additional mixing
- Steve Fallone – mastering

Design

- Roe Etheridge – photography

Additional musicians

- Katrina Ford – vocals, backing vocals
- Eleanore Everdell – vocals
- David Bergander – drums
- Yoshi Takamasa – shaker, claves, congas, bells, percussion
- Stuart D. Bogie – sax, horn arrangements, tenor sax
- Colin Stetson – sax, baritone sax
- Matana Roberts – alto sax, clarinet
- Leah Paul – horns
- Eric Biondo – trumpet
- Aaron Johnson – trombone
- Martin Perna – saxophones, flutes
- Claudia Chopek – violin, string arrangements
- Janis Shen – violin, string arrangements
- Perry Serpa – additional string arrangements
- Lara Hicks – viola
- Eleanor Norton – cello

== Charts ==
Chart performance for Dear Science
Chart (2008)	Peak position
Australian Albums (ARIA)	26
Austrian Albums (Ö3 Austria)	69
Belgian Albums (Ultratop Flanders)	20
Belgian Albums (Ultratop Wallonia)	41
Canadian Albums (Billboard)	26
Dutch Albums (Album Top 100)	27
French Albums (SNEP)	57
German Albums (Offizielle Top 100)	76
Irish Albums (IRMA)	27
Italian Albums (FIMI)	73
New Zealand Albums (RMNZ)	25
Norwegian Albums (VG-lista)	16
Swiss Albums (Schweizer Hitparade)	77
UK Albums (Official Charts)	33
US Billboard 200	12
US Top Rock Albums (Billboard)	4
