= Gerard Smith (musician) =

American musician (1974–2011)

- Born: Gerard Anthony Smith; September 20, 1974
- Died: April 20, 2011 (aged 36)
- Genres: Experimental rock; indie rock
- Instruments: Bass guitar; keyboards; guitar; sitar

Gerard Anthony Smith (September 20, 1974 – April 20, 2011) was an American musician and member of the Brooklyn-based band TV on the Radio. He recorded an album of original music as A Rose Parade with Shannon Funchess of Light Asylum and also produced music with Midnight Masses and The Stationary Set. He died at age 36 from lung cancer.

As a self-taught musician who played the piano, bass, organ, classical guitar, and sitar, he studied fine arts and Art History at the Fashion Institute of Technology and SUNY Purchase.

Smith was busking in a Brooklyn subway when he was recruited by TV on the Radio's Tunde Adebimpe in 2003. Smith recalled in an interview:

I saw Tunde in the movie Jump Tomorrow on IFC. And I was super addicted to film at that time. A year later, I was playing on the subway platform here, at the Bedford stop, and he kept giving me money. And then I was like, I recognize this guy. Then it finally clicked, and I said, 'Dude you were in that movie! I loved that movie!' That film had meant a lot to me, especially because there was a black actor that wasn't in the ghetto, and there weren't a lot of politics. He was being a human being and not only a black actor. And that meant a lot to me.

Smith played on the critically acclaimed albums Return to Cookie Mountain, Dear Science, and Nine Types of Light.

Aside from writing music and playing bass and keyboards in TV on the Radio, Smith, along with Adebimpe, composed the score for the 2010 documentary feature The Lottery, (now Success Academy Harlem).

== Tributes ==
The song "Killer Crane" from Nine Types Of Light was written about the band coming to terms with Smith's impending death, and the song's video serves as a tribute to him, featuring many shots of Smith.

Upon learning of his death on April 20, the band The National played "About Today" in his memory at their concert at Starlight Theater in Kansas City, Missouri.

The song "While You're Here" on Dirty Projectors' 2012 EP About to Die is a tribute to Gerard Smith.
