= Dragons of Zynth =

American indie rock band

- Also known as: D.O.Z
- Origin: Cleveland, Ohio, United States
- Genres: Indie rock
- Members: Akwetey; Aku; Jason Bernard Lucas
- Past members: Fon Lin Nyeu; Devang Arvind Shah

Dragons of Zynth also known as "D.O.Z" is an American indie rock band from Cleveland, Ohio. Their only album 'Coronation Thieves' came out in 2007, drawing comparisons with indie rock band TV on the Radio.

== History ==
Dragons of Zynth's frontmen, Aku and Akwetey, are twins born in New York City and were raised in Cleveland, Ohio. The group first won notice with the recording of their first single "War Lover" in 2004. The band gained attention early on for their live performances garnering the kudos of TV on the Radio and U.K. outfit Massive Attack. Their debut full-length, Coronation Thieves, was released in September 2007 and produced by David Sitek. Following the recording and release of Coronation Thieves, the band has shared stages with Modest Mouse, Television, Grizzly Bear, Saul Williams and The Roots.

In 2010 the band announced a hiatus to record for their follow up LP and pursue collaborative projects. Aku features on the song Tiger off the debut album of Maximum Balloon. The album by producer David Sitek features contributions by Celebration's Katrina Ford, The Yeah Yeah Yeah's Karen O, and David Byrne. Making their foray onscreen the twins site "getting fitted for their first projects on the same day." In 2010, Akwetey debuts as a labor striker in season two's Georgia Peaches episode of Boardwalk Empire. Aku debuts in his first onscreen role as Fast Kid in Lex Sidon's Grand Street.

In 2011 Aku was invited by Santi White to play in Santigold, touring worldwide release of Master of My Make Believe. Between international dates with Santigold, multi-instrumentalist and vocalist Aku is credited as producer of the yet to be named Dragons full-length.

In anticipation of their full length, DOZ members have collaborated with French video artist Camille Henrot on her latest work entitled "Grosse Fatigue". In June 2013, the video art piece was awarded the Silver Lion at the Venice Biennale's 55 International Art Exhibition.

== Members ==
- Akwetey - voice, guitar, fx,
- Aku - voice, keyboards, guitar
- J.Bernard - drums

Former

- Fon Lin Nyeu - keyboards
- Devang Arvind Shah - production, drums
- Matthew Davidson

== Discography ==
- Coronation Thieves (Gigantic Music, 2007)
- "Xerathyn" The Green Owl Compilation-A Benefit For The Energy Action Coalition (2010)

== Other appearances ==
- Aku is featured as a vocalist in Maximum Balloon's single "Tiger" (2010)
- Aku appears as "Fast Kid" in the 2012 release of Grand Street
- Akwetey appears as a Striker in Season Two's Georgia Peach episode of Boardwalk Empire, singing "A Balm in Gilead" (2011)
