= Tunde Adebimpe =

American musician (born 1975)

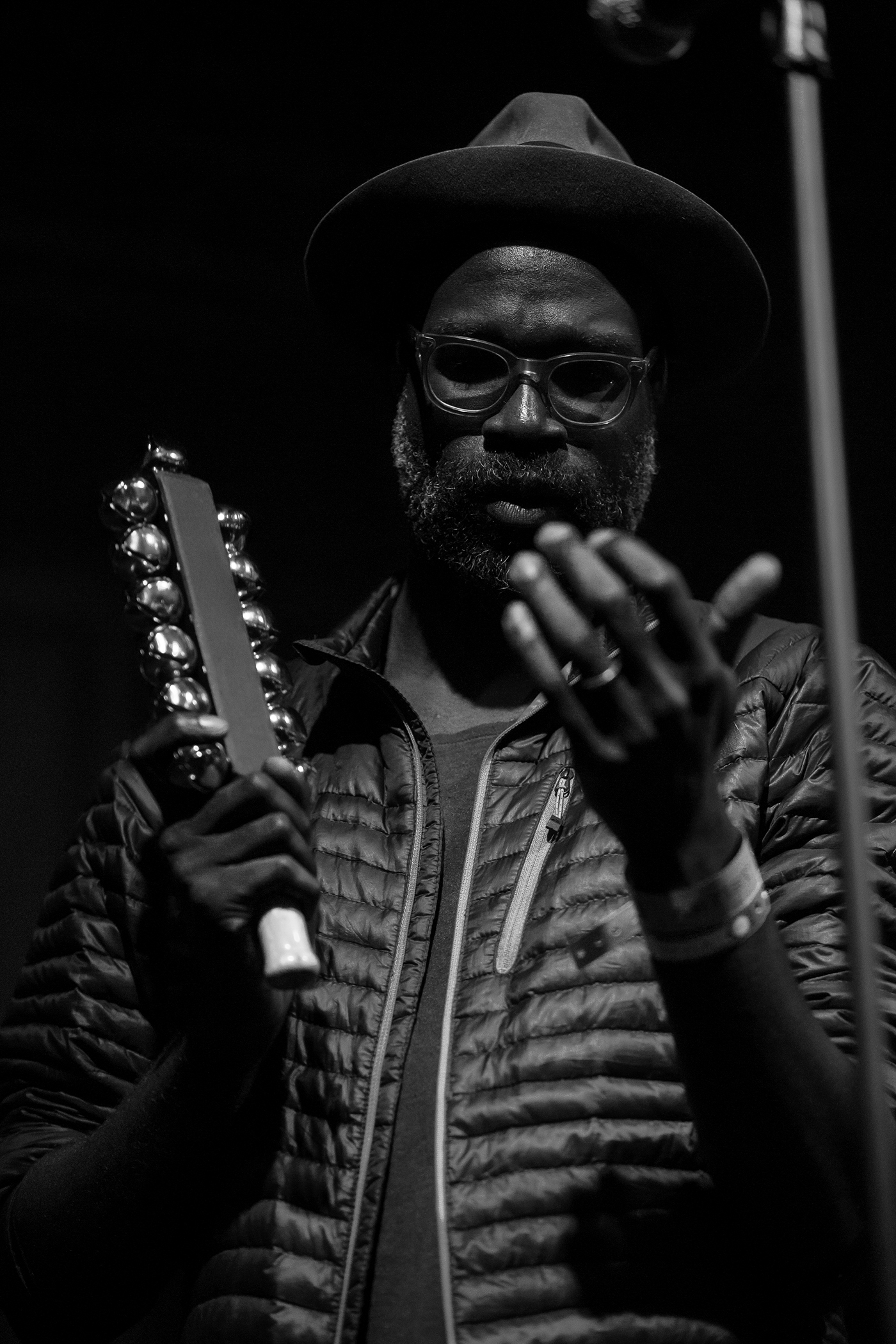
- Tunde Adebimpe performing with TV on the Radio in 2015

Background information
- Born: Babatunde Omoroga Adebimpe; February 25, 1975 (age 51); St. Louis, Missouri, U.S.
- Genres: Experimental rock; indie rock
- Occupations: Singer; musician; songwriter; actor
- Instruments: Vocals; keyboards; percussion
- Years active: 1998–present
- Label: Sub Pop
- Member of: TV on the Radio
- Formerly of: Nevermen, Stabbing Eastward, Higgins Waterproof Black Magic Band

Babatunde Omoroga Adebimpe (born February 25, 1975) is an American musician, singer, songwriter, and actor. He is best known as a founding member and co-lead vocalist of the Brooklyn-based band TV on the Radio, with whom he has recorded five studio albums. In April 2025, Adebimpe released his debut solo album, Thee Black Boltz.

As an actor, Adebimpe has appeared in the films Twisters, Spider-Man: Homecoming, Marriage Story and Rachel Getting Married, in addition to several independent feature films. He appeared in the 2024 science fiction television series Star Wars: Skeleton Crew, and provided voice acting on the animated series Strange Planet, Lazor Wolf, Pantheon, and Tuca & Bertie.

== Early and personal life ==
Adebimpe was born into a Nigerian immigrant family in the United States. He attended Shady Side Academy in Fox Chapel, Pennsylvania for high school, where he is still active on the board. His deceased father was a psychiatrist in Pittsburgh. Adebimpe is married to French cartoonist Domitille Collardey, with whom he has a daughter.

== Music career ==
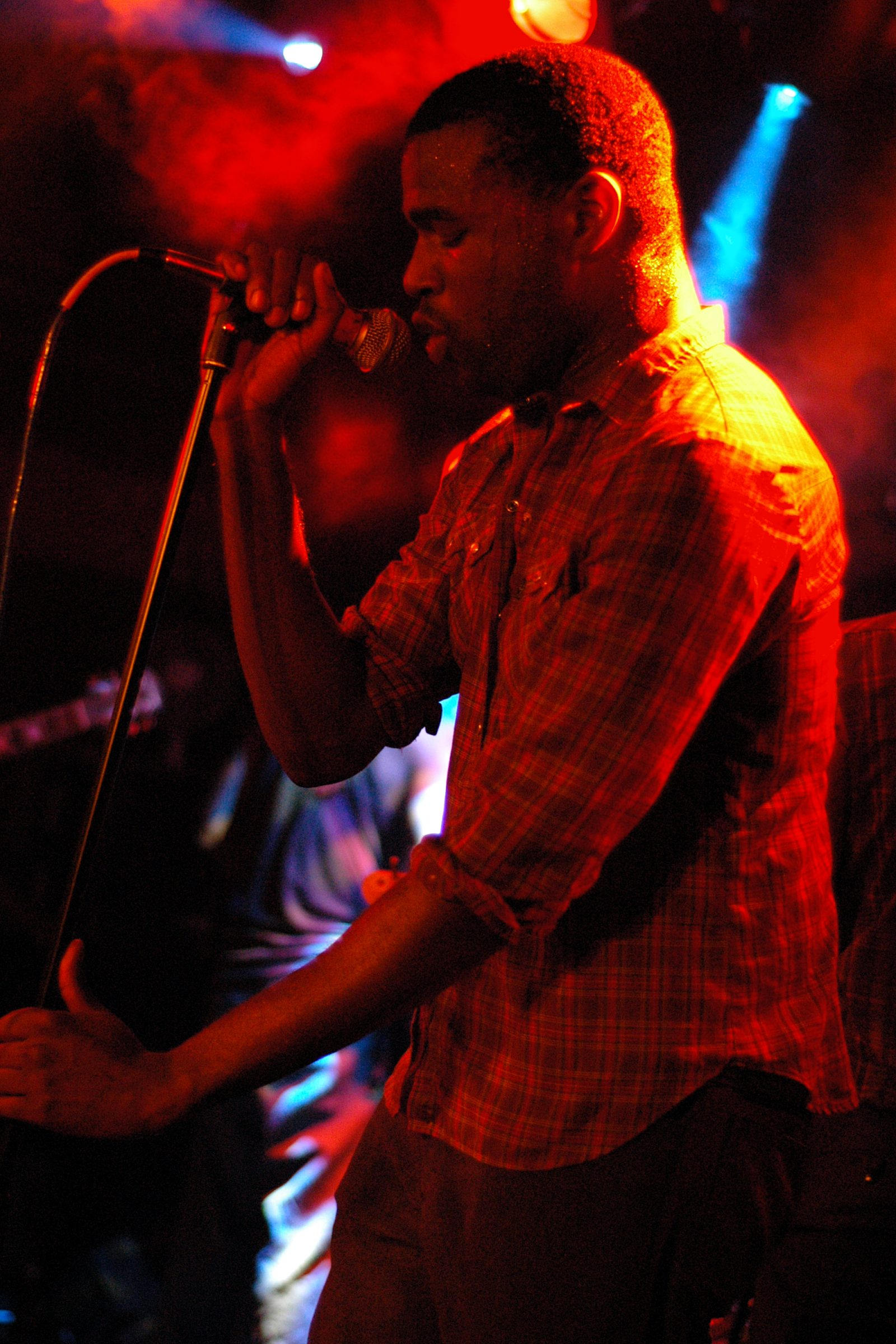
Adebimpe in 2004

=== TV on the Radio ===
Adebimpe co-founded TV on the Radio in 2001 alongside guitarist and producer Dave Sitek. Originally its sole lead vocalist, he and Sitek were later joined by co-lead vocalist and guitarist Kyp Malone. This trio wrote and recorded the band's debut album Desperate Youth, Blood Thirsty Babes, which was released in 2004. Following its release, the band expanded again to include the rhythm section of bassist Gerard Smith and drummer Jaleel Bunton. This line-up of the band recorded three critically acclaimed studio albums together: Return to Cookie Mountain (2006), Dear Science (2008) and Nine Types of Light (2011). Smith died shortly after the release of Nine Types of Light, with the band continuing on as a quartet and Bunton switching to bass to perform Smith's parts live. Their fifth album, and first as a quartet, was entitled Seeds, and was released in 2014.

=== Solo work and collaborations ===
Prior to launching his solo career, Adebimpe rarely performed away from TV on the Radio. He did, however, regularly collaborate with other musicians. He provided backing vocals on the track "Dragon Queen" on the Yeah Yeah Yeahs' 2009 record, It's Blitz!, which was produced by fellow TV on the Radio member Sitek. He appeared on several tracks of Dragons of Zynth's Coronation Thieves, also partially produced by Sitek. He produced and provided guest vocals on "Your Glasshouse", a track from Atmosphere's 2008 record When Life Gives You Lemons, You Paint That Shit Gold, and was featured on the song "Deathful" on Subtle's album Yell&Ice. In 2008, Adebimpe formed the experimental side project Nevermen with Mike Patton and Doseone. Their self-titled debut album, was ultimately released in 2016.

In early 2009, he performed three shows as a duo with Tall Firs drummer Ryan Sawyer, the latter two under the name Stabbing Eastward. Also in early 2009, Adebimpe released a combined single/DVD under the name Fake Male Voice on the Japan/Brooklyn label Heartfast. He performed one show under that name with a pickup group at the record's release party. Fake Male Voice again performed at a Heartfast showcase during CMJ 2009, as a duo comprising Adebimpe and Gerard Smith.

In 2009 Adebimpe collaborated with Massive Attack on the track "Pray for Rain".

In 2010, Adebimpe was featured on Sitek's project Maximum Balloon on the track "Absence of Light". Adebimpe, with members of TV on the Radio, were featured on three tracks from Tinariwen's album Tassili (2011), and on the Amadou & Mariam track "Wily Kataso", from the 2012 album Folila. Ian Brennan was a producer on the record, which went on to win a Grammy.

In 2012, Adebimpe formed the band Higgins Waterproof Black Magic Band, who released their self-titled EP on their own ZNA records in October 2013. Adebimpe provided the vocals on Bad Radio, a track on Leftfield's Alternative Light Source album in 2015. Adebimpe provided the vocals on "Thieves! (Screamed The Ghosts)" on Run The Jewels' album Run the Jewels 3 in 2017.

Adebimpe collaborated with Rockstar Games and released Speedline Miracle Masterpiece (ft. Sal P. & Sinkane) as part of the Welcome to Los Santos soundtrack for Grand Theft Auto V. The song was also used for the trailer music for the Further Adventures in Finance and Felony DLC.

In October 2022, he contributed a cover of Sleater-Kinney's "The Drama You've Been Craving" for Dig Me In: A Dig Me Out Covers Album, a tribute compilation in occasion of the twenty-fifth anniversary of Dig Me Out. Pitchfork called the track a "high point", describing Adebimpe's rendition as "barely recognizable, swapping its frenetic spunk for sultry synth-pop".

In October 2024, Adebimpe announced that he had signed to Sub Pop for his debut solo LP, with the title later revealed to be Thee Black Boltz. The album was released on April 18, 2025.

== Film and television career ==
In 1998, Adebimpe worked as one of the initial animators of MTV's hyper-violent claymation program Celebrity Deathmatch.

He starred in a 2001 indie movie, Jump Tomorrow, based on a short college film, Jorge, in which he played the same character.

In 2003, Adebimpe directed the music video for the Yeah Yeah Yeahs song "Pin".

In 2008, he appeared as the groom in Jonathan Demme's Rachel Getting Married alongside Rosemarie DeWitt, who portrayed his character's bride, and Anne Hathaway, who portrayed the bride's wayward sister. In the film, Adebimpe performs an a cappella cover of the Neil Young song "Unknown Legend".

In 2011, Adebimpe directed the visual companion to the band's fourth album, Nine Types of Light. For the film, he recruited a roster of the band's favorite filmmakers to helm individual clips that would be sewn together into an abstract narrative about dreams, love, fame and the future. Adebimpe directed the video for the song "Forgotten", as well as the interstitial clips where a chorus of narrators help try to connect the dots between the film's various segments.

In 2013, Adebimpe directed and animated the video for Higgins Waterproof Black Magic Band's single "The Blast the Bloom", In late 2013, Adebimpe wrapped shooting on Chilean director Sebastian Silva's Nasty Baby, starring opposite Kristen Wiig and director Silva. The film was released in 2015.

Adebimpe made a brief cameo as himself on the IFC program Portlandia in the show's season 4 premiere.

In 2015, Adebimpe appeared in Bob Byington's 7 Chinese Brothers alongside Jason Schwartzman.

In 2016, he provided the voice for the character Banana Guard #16 in the Adventure Time episode "The Thin Yellow Line".

In 2017, he starred in the second season of The Girlfriend Experience.

Adebimpe portrayed Mr. Cobbwell in Spider-Man: Homecoming (2017).

He appeared in the second episode of the 2020 HBO series Perry Mason, in a small role as a street preacher.

In 2022 and 2023, he provided the voice for Stephen Gold in the AMC+ series Pantheon.

Adebimpe has been cast in the 2024 TV show Star Wars: Skeleton Crew.

== Visual art ==
Originally a cartoonist, Adebimpe still maintains a design, drawing and painting practice. In addition to art directing all of TV on the Radio's album covers, he painted the cover for the band's 2013 single "Mercy".

In 2009, Adebimpe released a self-published art comic, Plague Hero. The painted book depicts a boxing match between two anthropomorphic characters. Randomly selected copies contained a DVD of "Mystery Sh*t", a compilation of song sketches and animations from Adebimpe's archives.

In May 2017, Adebimpe premiered A Warm Weather Ghost, a live, multimedia performance work commissioned by the Walker Art Center in Minneapolis.

== Filmography ==
=== Film ===
Year	Title	Role	Notes
1998	Jorge	George	Short Film
2001	Jump Tomorrow	George Abiola	
2004	The First Three Lives of Stuart Hornsley	Stuart Hornsley	Short Film
2004	Portrait of a Sellout	Jack	Short Film
2008	Rachel Getting Married	Sidney	
2013	The Sun Thief		Short Film
2015	Nasty Baby	Mo	
2015	7 Chinese Brothers	Major Norwood	
2017	Night Shift	Oliver 'Olly' Jeffries	Short Film
2017	Spider-Man: Homecoming	Mr. Cobbwell	
2019	Cap	Victor Benett	Short Film
2019	Marriage Story	Sam	
2020	She Dies Tomorrow	Brian	
2021	The Sleeping Negro	Sheriff	
2021	Ultrasound	Dr. Conners	
2022	No More Time	Noah	
2024	Twisters	Dexter	
2024	The Heart		Short Film

=== Television ===
Year	Title	Role	Notes
1998–1999	Celebrity Deathmatch	Michael Jordan (voice)	2 episodes
2012	Superjail!	Prison Inmate Leader (voice)	Episode: "Specialneeds"
2013	As Da Art World Might Turn	Jimmy Braswell	2 episodes
2014	Portlandia	Tunde Adebimpe	Episode: "Sharing Finances"
2016	The New Yorker Presents	Dinner Host	Episode: "Dinner Host"
2016	Adventure Time	Banana Guard #16 (voice)	Episode: "The Thin Yellow Line"
2016	Search Party	Edwin	Episode: "The Secret of the Sinister Ceremony"
2017	The Girlfriend Experience	Ian Olsen	7 episodes
2019–2021	Lazor Wulf	Lamont Brickwater, The Spirit, Commercial Narrator, The Streets (voice)	7 episodes
2020	Perry Mason	Preacher	Episode: "Chapter Two"
2021	Tuca & Bertie	Desmond Toucan (voice)	Episode: "Corpse Week"
2022—2023	Pantheon	Stephen Gold (voice)	7 episodes
2023	Strange Planet	Various roles	Main voice role
2024—2025	Star Wars: Skeleton Crew	Wendle	6 episodes

== Discography ==
=== Solo ===
==== Albums ====
Title	Album details
Thee Black Boltz	Released: April 18, 2025; Label: Sub Pop

==== Singles ====
Title	Year	Peak chart positions	Album
Title	Year	US AAA	Album
"Magnetic"	2024	24	Thee Black Boltz
"God Knows"	2025	24	Thee Black Boltz

=== Guest appearances ===
Title	Year	Other performer(s)	Album
"Phoenix"	2016	Little Shalimar, Roxiny	Rubble Kings Soundtrack
"Pray For Rain"	2009	Massive Attack	Heligoland

=== with TV on the Radio ===
- Desperate Youth, Blood Thirsty Babes (2004)
- Return to Cookie Mountain (2006)
- Dear Science (2008)
- Nine Types of Light (2011)
- Seeds (2014)
