= Dave Sitek =

American musician and producer (born 1972)

- Sitek performing with TV on the Radio at the 9:30 Club in 2009

Background information
- Also known as: Maximum Balloon
- Born: David Andrew Sitek; September 6, 1972 (age 54)
- Genre: Indie rock
- Occupations: Record producer; multi-instrumentalist
- Instruments: Guitar; keyboards; bass; drums
- Years active: 2001–present
- Labels: Touch and Go; 4AD; DGC; Interscope; Federal Prism; Harvest
- Member of: TV on the Radio
- Formerly of: Jane's Addiction

David Andrew Sitek (born September 6, 1972) is an American musician and record producer, known for his work with his band TV on the Radio and Yeah Yeah Yeahs. He has also worked with Liars, Foals, Celebration, Little Dragon, Wavves, Beady Eye, and Weezer, and produced free jazz-influenced remixes of songs by artists such as Beck and Nine Inch Nails, and has contributed a solo track to the Red Hot Organization Dark Was the Night charity compilation. He is also a photographer and painter.

In April 2008, Sitek was named number one in NME's Future 50 list of the most forward thinking people in music today.

In 2009, Sitek contributed a cover of "With a Girl Like You" to the AIDS benefit album, Dark Was the Night, produced by the Red Hot Organization.

A solo album from Sitek under the moniker Maximum Balloon was released on September 21, 2010, on Interscope with individual songs released as singles commencing June 15, 2010. The record includes contributions by many guests including David Byrne, Tunde Adebimpe, and Karen O.

== Early life ==
Born in 1972, Sitek grew up in Columbia, Maryland, together with his brothers. His mother worked in public education with a degree in child psychology and, according to Sitek, "was pretty good about letting me and my brothers explore things. So much so that [she] let me start a hardcore band and practice in our house when I was 14". Sitek developed an interest in music at an early age influenced by his "aunt Paula [who] sneaked out of the house [to see] Jimi Hendrix in the 1960s, and was really into Talking Heads and Blondie".

Dave Sitek once worked in a coffee shop with future TV on the Radio bandmate Kyp Malone and Grizzly Bear bassist Chris Taylor.

== Selected discography ==
=== With Jane's Addiction ===
- The Great Escape Artist (2011)

=== Production work ===
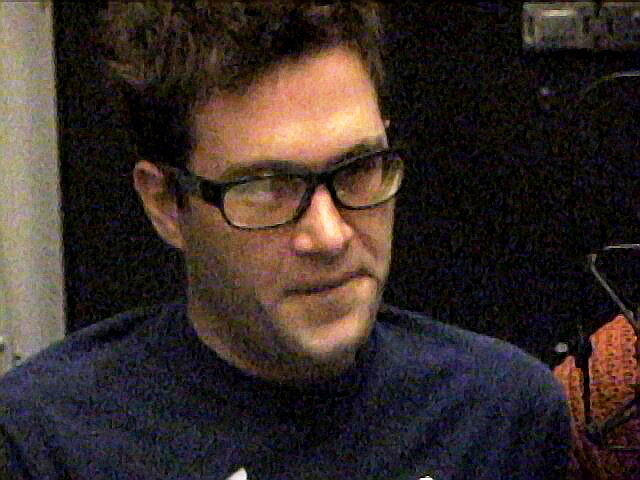
Sitek during an interview with WNYU-FM in 2004

Sitek produced the album Anywhere I Lay My Head for actress and singer Scarlett Johansson, released in May 2008. Sitek also co-produced the debut album Antidotes by Foals and the debut EP of Chicago band Aleks and the Drummer titled May a Lightning Bolt Caress You self released by the band in June 2008.

He works with several Brooklyn acts, having recently remixed the song "Disco Lights" for Apollo Heights and produced albums for Dragons of Zynth and Telepathe.

- The Orwells – Other Voices – Dave Sitek Version
- TV on the Radio – OK Calculator (2002)
- Yeah Yeah Yeahs – Yeah Yeah Yeahs (2002)
- Love Life – Here Is Night, Brothers, Here the Birds Burn (2002)
- Yeah Yeah Yeahs – Fever to Tell (2003)
- TV on the Radio – Desperate Youth, Blood Thirsty Babes (2004)
- Liars – They Were Wrong, So We Drowned (2004)
- Celebration – Celebration (2006)
- TV on the Radio – Return to Cookie Mountain (2006)
- Yeah Yeah Yeahs – Show Your Bones (2006)
- The OhSees – The Cool Death of Island Raiders (2006)
- Dragons of Zynth – Coronation Thieves (2007)
- Celebration – The Modern Tribe (2007)
- Foals – Antidotes (2008)
- Scarlett Johansson – Anywhere I Lay My Head (2008)
- Aleks and the Drummer – May A Lightning Bolt Caress You! (2008)
- TV on the Radio – Dear Science (2008)
- Telepathe – Dance Mother (2009)
- Iran – Dissolver (2009)
- Yeah Yeah Yeahs – It's Blitz! (2009)
- Pink Noise – What Will Happen If Someone Finds Out? (2009)
- Wale – Attention Deficit (2009)
- Holly Miranda – The Magician's Private Library (2010)
- Daniel Higgs – Say God (2010)
- TV on the Radio – Nine Types of Light
- Icky Blossoms, (2012)
- Santigold – Master of My Make-Believe (2012)
- CSS – Planta (2013)
- Ximena Sariñana – Ximena Sariñana (2012)
- Bat for Lashes – The Haunted Man
- Beady Eye – BE (2013)
- Yeah Yeah Yeahs – Mosquito (2013)
- TV on the Radio – "Mercy" and "Million Miles" (2013)
- Oh Land – Wishbone (8 tracks) (2013)
- Erik Hassle – "Somebody's Party" from Somebody's Party – EP (2014)
- Elliphant – "Look Like You Love It" from Look Like You Love It (2014)
- Kelis – Food (2014)
- Cerebral Ballzy – Jaded & Faded (2014)
- Francisca Valenzuela – Tajo Abierto (4 tracks) (2014)
- TV on the Radio – Seeds (2014)
- Pussy Riot - Straight Outta Vagina (2016)
- Preservation Hall Jazz Band – So It Is (2017)
- Beyoncé & Jay-Z – "LoveHappy" from Everything Is Love (2018)
- Weezer – Weezer (Black Album) (2019)
- In the Valley Below – The Pink Chateau (2019)
- Adil Omar – "The Great Unraveling" from Mastery (guitars only) (2020)
- Our Lady Peace – Spiritual Machines II (2021)
- Yeah Yeah Yeahs – Cool It Down (2022)
- WitchGang (2023-2024)
- Chelsea Wolfe – "Dusk" from She Reaches Out to She Reaches Out to She (2024)
- Skunk Anansie - "The Painful Truth" (2025)
- Lykke Li - "So Happy I Could Die", "Sick Of Love" and "Knife In The Heart" from The Afterparty (2026)
- Empress Of - "Wild Storm" (2026)
- N8NOFACE - "Paranoid" (2026)
- Eartheater - Heavenly Body: If I'm the Bottle You're the Message(2026)

Though Sitek has collaborated with several Brooklyn-based indie bands, he looks upon the indie music movement with skepticism. In an interview with the Danish music magazine Soundvenue, he explained that he is dissatisfied with the opportunistic turn music has taken, referring to the self-promoting indie bands moving to Brooklyn only to claim that they are from "the creative mecca" in order to get the attention of music magazines. This may explain why Sitek has settled down on the West coast in Beverly Hills, California. He explained, "People can't hide themselves out here. Everyone looks after his own interests. It's a very egocentric city. But I don't care what 'indie people' think. Those bands complaining about other bands selling out, got their iPod filled up with illegal music." On his solo project Maximum Balloon, Sitek collaborates with many of his old friends (among these are Karen O, David Byrne and Kyp Malone from TV on the Radio), whom he claims are still interested in creating beautiful songs, not only songs that the music magazines want to write about, which, he thinks, keeps music interesting.

=== Solo work ===
- Maximum Balloon (Interscope, 2010)

=== Singles ===
- If You Return featuring Little Dragon (2010)
- Groove Me featuring Theophilus London (2010)
- Tiger featuring Aku (2010)

=== Features ===
- MF Doom – Gazzilion Ear (Jneiro Jarel feat Dave Sitek Remix) (2009)

=== Remixes ===
- Fischerspooner "Never Win (Dave Sitek Remix)" (2005), FS Studios
- Hope of the States "Sing It Out (David Andrew Sitek's Skyhorse Mix)" (2006), Columbia
- Lee "Scratch" Perry "Fire in Babylon (Dave Sitek Remix)" (2006), Narnack
- Nine Inch Nails "Survivalism (Dave Sitek Remix)" (2007), Interscope
- The Knife "Marble House (Dave Sitek Remix)" (2007), Brille
- Beck "Dark Star (David Andrew Sitek Remix)" (2007), Interscope
- Bat for Lashes "Sleep Alone (909s In Darktimes Mix)" (2009), Parlophone
- Steven Wilson "Harmony Korine (David A. Sitek Magnetized Nebula Mix)" (2009), Kscope
- Fanfarlo "Fire Escape (David Sitek Remix)" (2010), Atlantic
- UNKLE "Follow Me Down (Dave Sitek Remix)" (2010), Surrender All
- Gypsy and the Cat "Time to Wander (David Andrew Sitek Remix)" (2010), RCA
- MF Doom "Gazzillion Ear (Dave Sitek / Jneiro Jarel Remix)" (2010), Lex Records
- Tegan and Sara "Alligator (Dave Sitek Remix)" (2010), Sire
- Lykke Li "I Follow Rivers (Dave Sitek Remix)" (2011), LL Recordings
- Dels "Gob (David Andrew Sitek Remix)" (2011), Big Dada Recordings
- The Naked and Famous "Young Blood (David Andrew Sitek Remix)" (2011), Universal Music
- Norah Jones "After the Fall (David Andrew Sitek Remix)" (2012), Parlophone
- Norah Jones "She's 22 (David Andrew Sitek Remix)" (2012), Parlophone
- Florence and the Machine "No Light, No Light (DAS Remix)" (2012), Island Records
- Run The Jewels "Sea Legs (Dave Sitek Remix)" (2013), Fool's Gold Records
