= Kyp Malone =

American musician (born 1973)

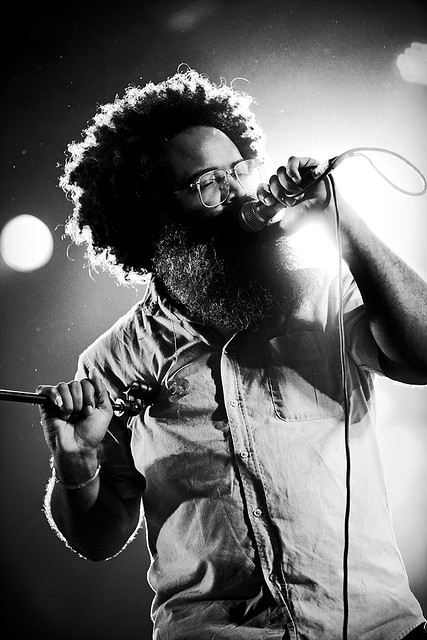
- Malone in 2009

Background information
- Born: February 27, 1973 (age 53)
- Occupations: Musician; record producer; actor
- Instruments: Vocals; guitar; bass guitar
- Labels: Touch and Go; 4AD; Interscope

Kyp Malone (born February 27, 1973) is an American multi-instrumentalist and member of the bands TV on the Radio, Iran, Rain Machine, and Ice Balloons.

== Biography ==
Malone grew up in Moon Township, Pennsylvania and moved to New Jersey for high school. He graduated from North Hunterdon High School in 1991.

Malone formed the band Iran with film director/singer/songwriter Aaron Aites in 2000.

He later joined Tunde Adebimpe and David Sitek in TV on the Radio on Desperate Youth, Bloodthirsty Babes and has been in the band ever since. He writes, sings and plays instruments for the band. In his lyrics, he uses poetic imagery to address racism, show business, and politics in an indirect manner.

Malone is in the band Ice Balloons and is also a member of The Yams Collective. He has also worked with Miles Benjamin Anthony Robinson, including producing Robinson's 2009 album Summer Of Fear.

In 2009, he released an album under the name Rain Machine, later touring to support the record. The album was produced by Ian Brennan. Malone has also toured and played with Jolie Holland, and was an influence on and early champion of singer-songwriter Sharon Van Etten.

He has recorded with the Malian band Tinariwen on their 2011 release Tassili. The album was recorded in the Algerian desert near the Libyan border.

Malone was included in the 2002 Bay Area indie film Scumrock. In 2015, Malone made a cameo on the TV series Broad City, playing a music store clerk in the episode "The Matrix".

In 2017, Malone collaborated with artist Kris Lemsalu creating the performance Going Going for the Performa 17 biennial.

He provided some of the music for the 2018 documentary film Dreaming of a Vetter World.

Malone acted in the 2021 science fiction film Doors.

Malone produced and played synthesizer on Matana Roberts' 2023 album Coin Coin Chapter Five: In the Garden.
