= TV on the Radio =

American rock band

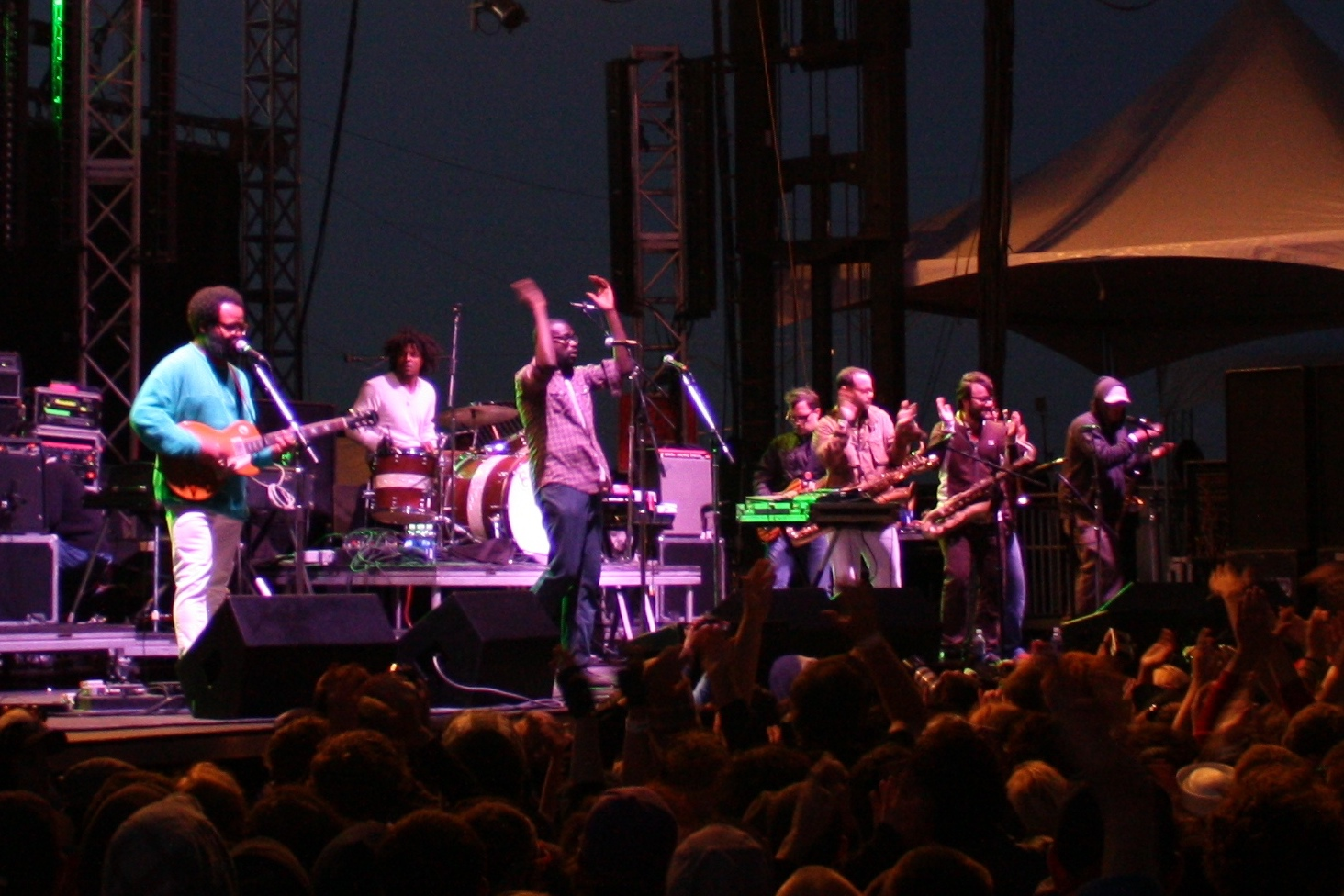
- TV on the Radio performing in 2008

Background information
- Origin: Brooklyn, New York, U.S.
- Genres: Indie rock; art rock; post-punk revival; post-rock; electronic
- Years active: 2001–present
- Labels: Federal Prism; Harvest; 4AD; Interscope; Touch and Go
- Members: Tunde Adebimpe; Dave Sitek; Kyp Malone; Jaleel Bunton
- Past members: Gerard Smith; Jason Sitek
- Website: tvontheradio.com

Cover of the band's debut release, OK Calculator

TV on the Radio (TVOTR) is an American rock band from Brooklyn, New York, formed in 2001. The band consists of Tunde Adebimpe (vocals, loops), Dave Sitek (guitars, keyboards, loops), Kyp Malone (vocals, guitars, bass, loops), and Jaleel Bunton (drums, bass, vocals, loops, guitars). Gerard Smith (bass, keyboards, loops) was a member of the band from 2005 until his death in 2011.

TVOTR has released five studio albums: Desperate Youth, Blood Thirsty Babes (2004), Return to Cookie Mountain (2006), Dear Science (2008), Nine Types of Light (2011), and Seeds (2014), alongside several EPs.

== History ==
=== 2001–2005: Formation, Young Liars, and Desperate Youth, Blood Thirsty Babes ===
The first release from TV on the Radio (initially just founding members Adebimpe and Sitek) was the self-published OK Calculator, the title being a reference to Radiohead's 1997 album, OK Computer. They were later joined by Kyp Malone and released the Young Liars EP in 2003. This was followed by the full-length Desperate Youth, Blood Thirsty Babes, which earned the band the 2004 Shortlist Music Prize. They released a second EP, New Health Rock, later that year.

=== 2006–2007: Return to Cookie Mountain ===
The band's second album, Return to Cookie Mountain, leaked in early 2006 and garnered pre-release praise from Pitchfork Media before its official release in July. The record was released in the US and Canada in September by Interscope. Spin magazine named Return to Cookie Mountain its Album of the Year for 2006. The record features guest appearances by David Bowie, Omega Moon, Celebration, Dragons of Zynth, Martin Perna and Stuart D. Bogie of Antibalas, Blonde Redhead, and Yeah Yeah Yeahs' Nick Zinner. Bowie contributed back-up vocals on the song "Province". In promotion of the album, the band performed "Wolf Like Me" on the Late Show with David Letterman, which has garnered over two million views on YouTube. During the US tour, TVOTR performed a few covers with Bauhaus vocalist, Peter Murphy, and Nine Inch Nails frontman, Trent Reznor.

=== 2008–2010: Dear Science ===
The band's third album, Dear Science, was released on September 23, 2008. It was made available for streaming on their Myspace page and subsequently leaked onto the internet on September 6, 2008. The album debuted at No. 12 on Billboard, which was the band's highest chart position of their career. The record was named the best album of 2008 by Rolling Stone, The Guardian, Spin, The A.V. Club, MTV, Entertainment Weekly, Pitchfork Media's readers' poll, as well as the Pazz and Jop critic's poll. It was also named the second best album of 2008 by NME and the fourth best by Planet Sound.

On September 22, 2008, TV on the Radio performed "Dancing Choose" on the Late Show with David Letterman. They also appeared on Later... with Jools Holland on September 30, 2008, performing "Golden Age" and "Dancing Choose", which were the same songs they performed on Saturday Night Live on February 7, 2009. The band performed "Dancing Choose" again on the February 9, 2009, episode of The Colbert Report.

On September 3, 2009, Tunde Adebimpe announced that TV on the Radio would be taking a year-long hiatus. Guitarist Kyp Malone's solo album, under the name Rain Machine, was released on September 22, 2009, on ANTI-. A solo album by Dave Sitek, Maximum Balloon, was released August 24, 2010, and featured a variety of guest vocals by many of his musician friends, such as Karen O, David Byrne, and both of his TVOTR vocalist bandmates. In addition, Sitek produced Holly Miranda's album The Magician's Private Library, which also featured fellow TVOTR members Jaleel Bunton and Kyp Malone.

In March 2010, Tunde Adebimpe designed a charity t-shirt for the Yellow Bird Project to raise money for Haiti Relief via Partners in Health.

=== 2011–2013: Nine Types of Light and death of Gerard Smith ===
On February 7, 2011, the band announced an end to their hiatus, along with an upcoming fourth album.

Nine Types of Light was released on April 12, 2011, along with a one-hour film under the same name, containing music videos for all the songs on the album, as well as interviews with various New Yorkers. The film was directed by different directors under Adebimpe's supervision.

It was announced in March 2011 that the band's bassist, Gerard Smith, was diagnosed with lung cancer. On April 20, 2011, the band announced Smith's death on their homepage: "We are very sad to announce the death of our beloved friend and bandmate, Gerard Smith, following a courageous fight against lung cancer. Gerard passed away the morning of April 20th, 2011. We will miss him terribly."

In May 2013, TVOTR headlined and curated the All Tomorrow's Parties music festival, held at Pontins holiday camp in Camber Sands, England, at which they debuted the new song "Mercy". They began streaming the studio version of "Mercy" online on July 30, 2013, and released the song for sale at digital music outlets a short time later. They also made the multitracks from "Mercy" available to fans so they could make their own remixes. The next single, "Million Miles", was released digitally a few months later.

=== 2013–2024: Seeds and hiatus ===
On November 8, 2013, via their Facebook page, the band announced they were at work on a new album. They made an official announcement on July 29, 2014, that this new album, titled Seeds, was scheduled for a late 2014 release.

In early 2015, it was announced that TVOTR would perform at the Shaky Knees and Boston Calling Music Festivals in May. On April 9, 2015, the band announced a 2015 North American summer tour to promote the new record. The tour began in May and included a concert at the Red Rocks Amphitheatre on July 27.

=== 2024–present: Return to touring ===
In September 2024, the band announced that they would be performing their first shows in five years and re-issuing their debut album for its twentieth anniversary, with ten performances announced for November and December 2024. Dave Sitek did not join TVOTR on these tour dates, though he remains a member of the band. Adebimpe noted: "He's just not touring. Everyone does what's healthiest for them at this point." The band toured until the end of 2025, performing shows in North America, the UK, South America, and Australia. In July 2026, the band's 2006 single "Wolf Like Me" was featured in an opening scene of Spider-Man: Brand New Day. Adebimpe had previously appeared in the first instalment of the reboot, Spider-Man: Homecoming, as Peter Parker's chemistry teacher Mr. Cobbwell.

== Style and influences ==
Writing for Stereogum, Chris DeVille described TV on the Radio's style as "a pioneering sound, one that spliced together post-rock and doo-wop and avant-garde electronics and rock 'n' roll as if they viewed guitar-driven indie not as a destination but a starting point". The band has said that their eclectic music is due to their appreciation for diverse bands, including Bad Brains, Earth, Wind & Fire, Nancy Sinatra, Serge Gainsbourg, Brian Eno, and Pixies. They have also named post-punk acts Wire and Siouxsie and the Banshees as influences.

== Band members ==
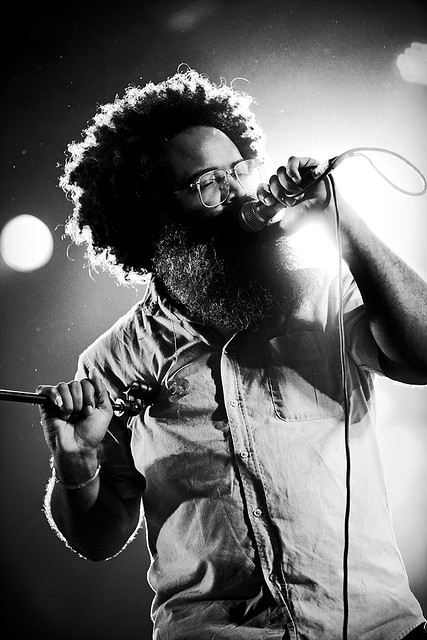
Kyp Malone in 2009

Current members

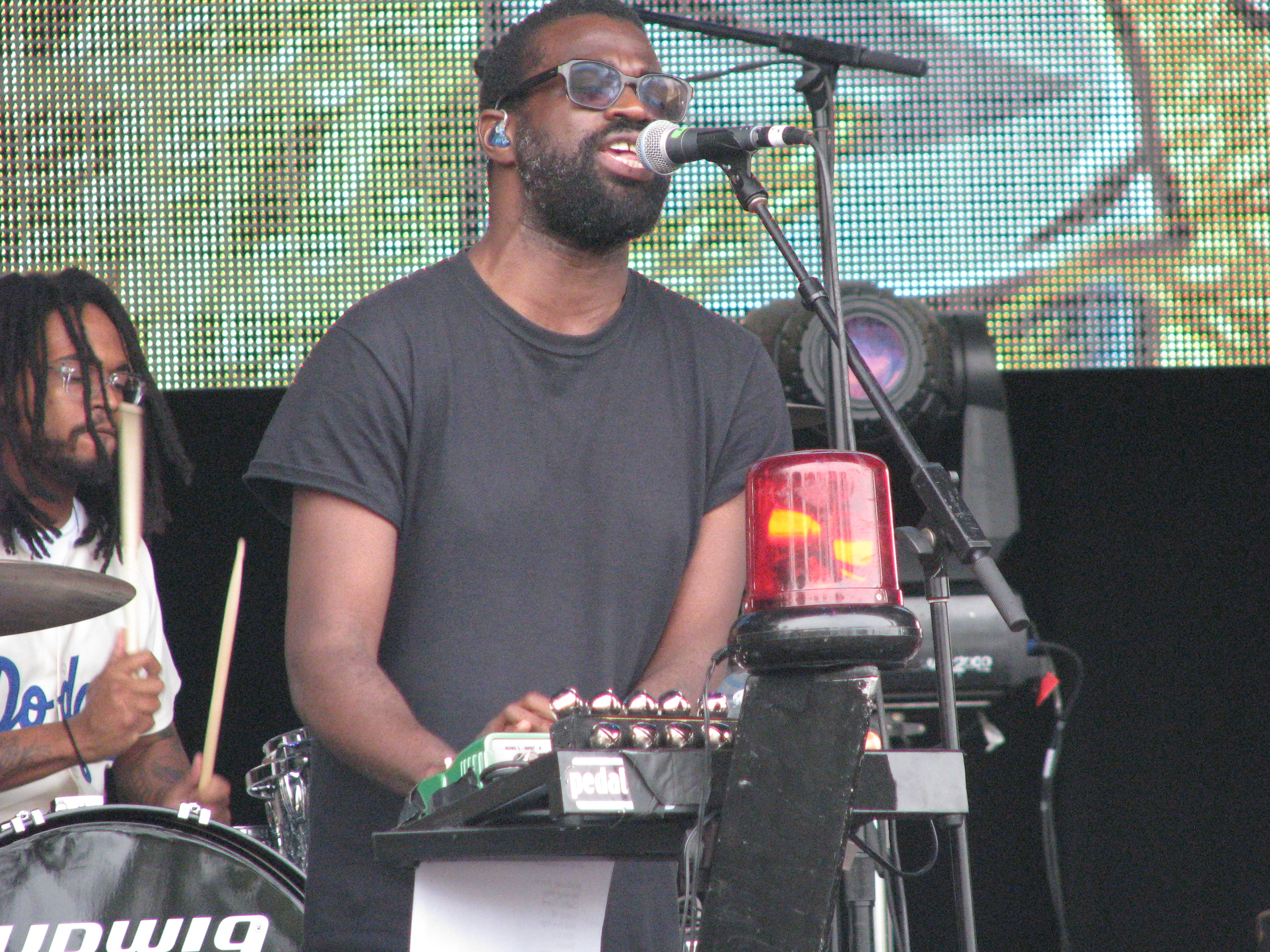
Tunde Adebimpe at Harvest Festival, 2011

- Tunde Adebimpe – lead vocals, programming, sequencer, percussion (2001–present)

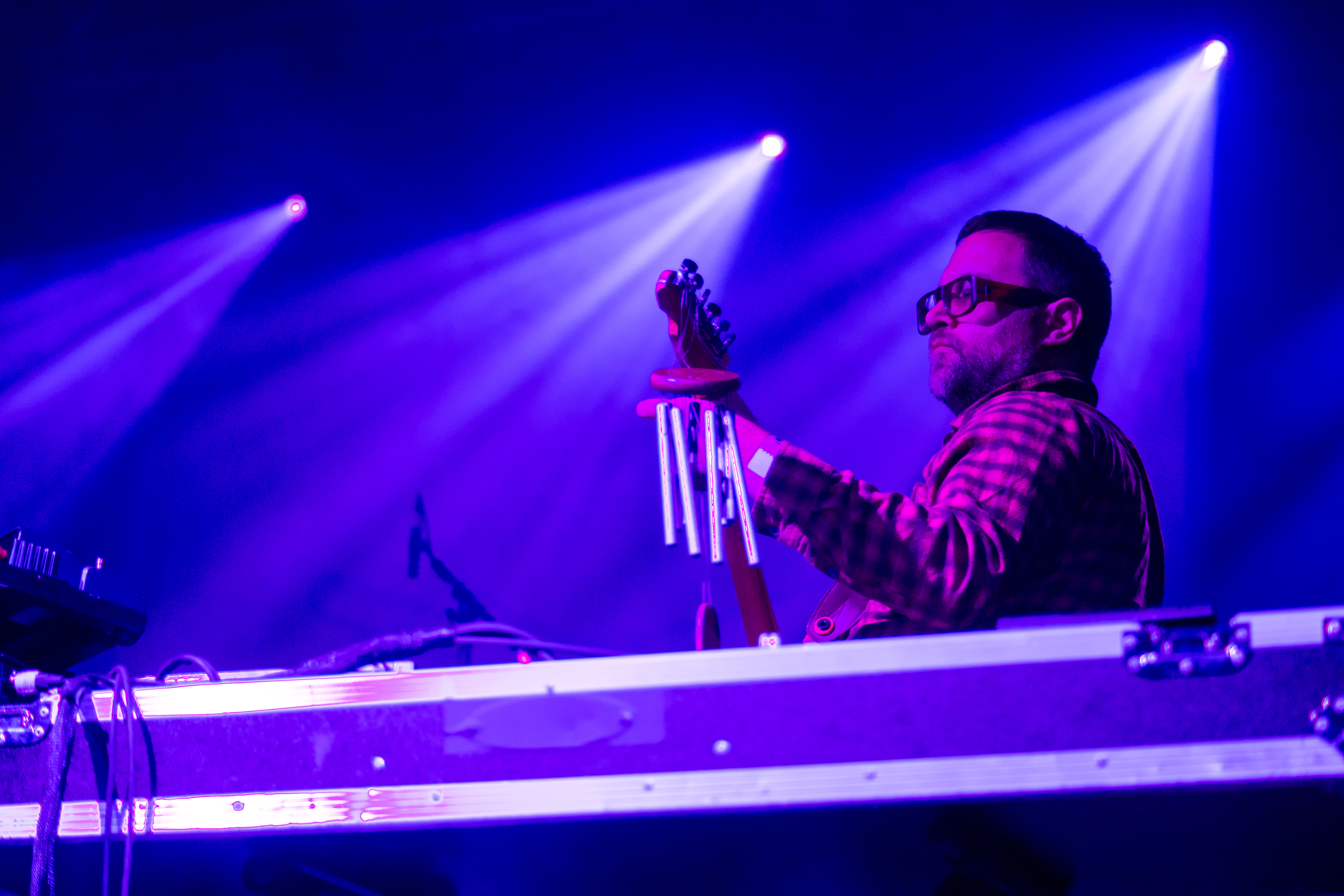
Dave Sitek in 2015

- David Sitek – lead guitar, programming, sampler, bass, synthesizer, horns, percussion (2001–present; currently inactive)
- Kyp Malone – rhythm guitar, bass, synthesizer, backing and occasional lead vocals (2003–present)
- Jaleel Bunton – drums, percussion (2005–present in studio; 2005–2011 live); keyboards, synthesizer, backing vocals (2005–present); bass, programming (2011–present in studio; 2011–2019 live); rhythm guitar (2005–2019); lead guitar (2024–present)

Current touring musicians

- Jahphet Landis – drums (2011–2019, 2024–present)
- Dave "Smoota" Smith – trombone, percussion, keyboards, bass (2011–2019, 2024–present)
- Taja Cheek – bass (2026–present)

Former members

- Gerard Smith – bass, keyboards, sampler, programming (2005–2011; died 2011)
- Jason Sitek – drums (2001–2003)

Former touring musicians

- Stuart D. Bogie – tenor saxophone (2008–2009)
- Colin Stetson – alto saxophone, baritone saxiphone (2008–2009)
- Jesske Hume – bass, synthesizer (2024–2026)

== Discography ==
- Desperate Youth, Blood Thirsty Babes (2004)
- Return to Cookie Mountain (2006)
- Dear Science (2008)
- Nine Types of Light (2011)
- Seeds (2014)
