= Karen O discography =

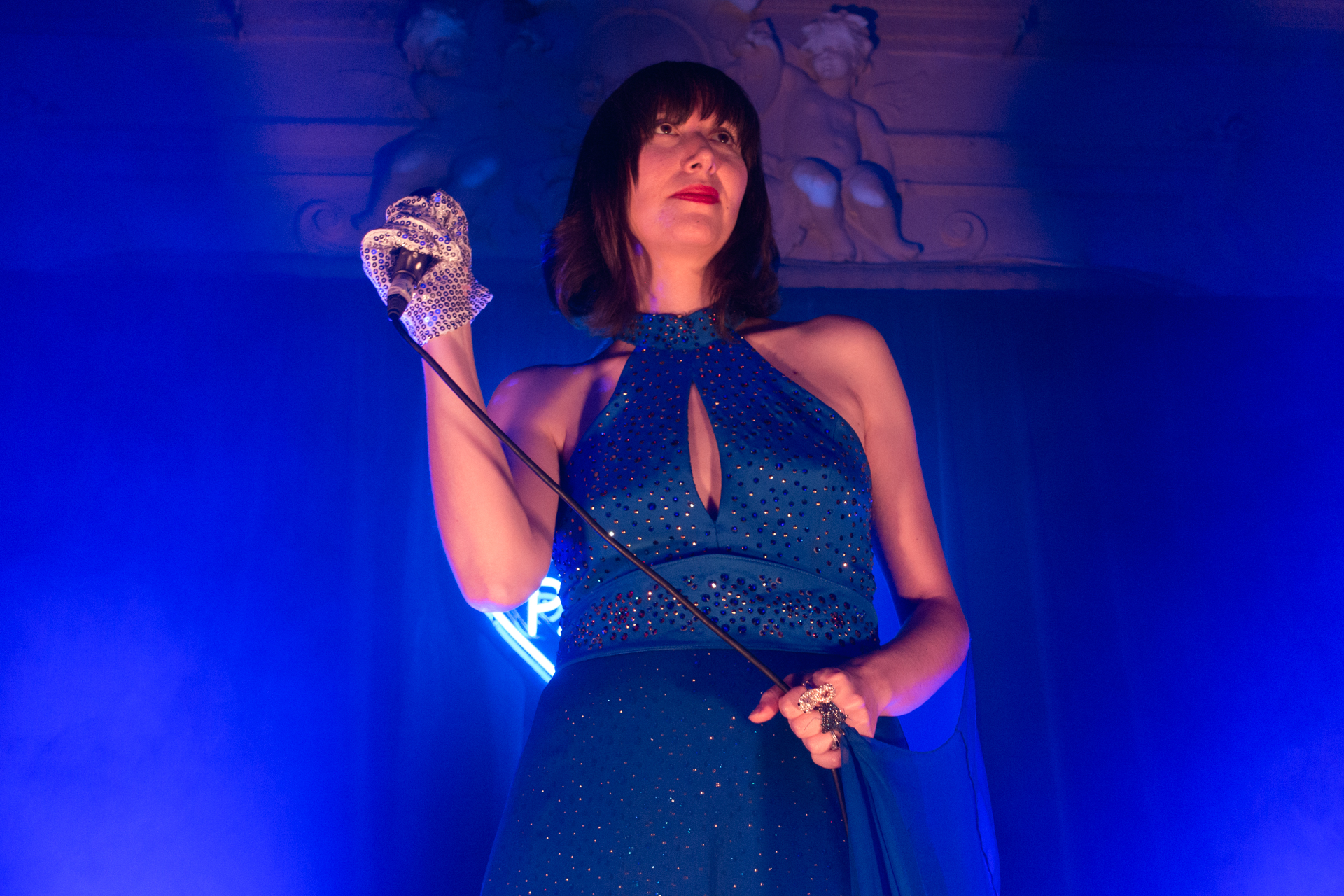
- Karen O performing in 2014
- Studio albums: 2
- Soundtrack albums: 1
- Live albums: 1
- Singles: 13

American singer and songwriter Karen O has released two studio albums, one live album, one soundtrack album, and 13 singles. She has also featured on several songs and composed for film soundtracks.

== Albums ==
=== Studio albums ===
List of studio albums with selected chart positions, showing year released and album name
Title	Album details	Peak chart positions							
Title	Album details	US	AUS	BEL (FL)	BEL (WA)	FRA	IRL	SCO	UK
Crush Songs	Released: September 5, 2014; Label: Cult; Format: Cassette, CD, digital download, LP, streaming	44	— (Note: Crush Songs did not enter the ARIA Top 100 Albums chart, but peaked at number six on the Top 20 Hitseekers Albums chart.)	81	184	—	72	63	61
Lux Prima (with Danger Mouse)	Released: March 15, 2019; Label: BMG; Format: Digital download, LP, streaming	— (Note: Lux Prima did not enter the Billboard 200, but peaked at number 25 on the US Sales chart.)	— (Note: Lux Prima did not enter the ARIA Top 100 Albums chart, but peaked at number 28 on the Top 100 Digital Albums chart.)	104	—	173	—	17	35
"—" denotes a recording that did not chart or was not released in that territory.

=== Live albums ===
List of live albums, showing year released and album name
Title	Details
Live from Crush Palace	Released: February 17, 2015; Label: Cult; Format: Digital download, streaming

=== Soundtrack albums ===
List of soundtrack albums with selected chart positions, showing year released and album name
Title	Details	Peak chart positions	
Title	Details	US	UK
Where the Wild Things Are	Released: September 29, 2009; Labels: DGC, Interscope; Format: Digital download, LP, streaming	35	— (Note: Where the Wild Things Are did not enter the UK Albums Chart, but peaked at number 89 on the UK Album Downloads Chart.)

== Singles ==
=== As lead artist ===
List of singles as lead artist with selected chart positions, showing year released and album name
Title	Year	Peak chart positions									Album
Title	Year	US Bub.	US Rock	AUS Hit.	CAN Rock	FRA	IRL	JPN	MEX	UK Phys.	Album
"All Is Love"	2009	— (Note: "All Is Love" did not enter the Billboard Hot 100, but peaked at number 37 on the US Heatseekers Songs chart.)	—	—	—	—	—	77	10	—	Where the Wild Things Are: Motion Picture Soundtrack
"Immigrant Song" (with Trent Reznor and Atticus Ross)	2011	8	— (Note: "Immigrant Song" did not enter the Hot Rock & Alternative Songs chart, but peaked at number 14 on the Rock Digital Song Sales chart.)	8	43	—	—	—	49	—	The Girl with the Dragon Tattoo
"The Moon Song"	2014	—	27	—	—	194	88	—	34	—	Non-album single
"Rapt"	2014	—	—	—	—	—	—	—	—	6	Crush Songs
"I Shall Rise"	2015	—	—	—	—	—	—	—	—	—	Non-album singles
"Yo! My Saint" (featuring Michael Kiwanuka)	2018	—	—	—	—	—	—	—	41	—	Non-album singles
"Anti-Lullaby"	2019	—	—	—	—	—	—	—	—	—	Hanna: Season 1 (Music from the Amazon Original Series)
"Bullet With Butterfly Wings"	2019	—	—	—	—	—	—	—	—	—	Hanna: Season 1 (Music from the Amazon Original Series)
"Woman" (with Danger Mouse)	2019	—	—	—	—	—	—	—	—	—	Lux Prima
"Lux Prima" (with Danger Mouse)	2019	—	—	—	—	—	—	—	—	3	Lux Prima
"Turn The Light" (with Danger Mouse)	2019	—	40	—	—	—	—	—	—	—	Lux Prima
"Under Pressure" (with Willie Nelson)	2020	—	—	—	—	—	—	—	—	18	Non-album singles
"Super Breath" (with Danger Mouse)	2024	—	— (Note: "Super Breath" did not enter the Hot Rock & Alternative Songs chart, but peaked at number 33 on the Adult Alternative Airplay chart.)	—	—	—	—	—	—	—	Non-album singles
"—" denotes a recording that did not chart or was not released in that territory.

=== As featured artist ===
List of singles as featured artist with selected chart positions, showing year released and album name
Title	Year	Peak chart positions		Album
Title	Year	US	MEX	Album
"Hello Tomorrow" (Adidas version) (Squeak E. Clean featuring Karen O)	2005	85	—	Non-album single
"Strange Enough" (N.A.S.A featuring Karen O, Ol' Dirty Bastard, and Fatlip)	2010	—	—	The Spirit of Apollo
"Pinky's Dream" (David Lynch featuring Karen O)	2012	—	37	Crazy Clown Time
"Let It Grow" (Maximum Balloon featuring Karen O and Tunde Adebimpe)	2015	—	—	Non-album single
"—" denotes a recording that did not chart or was not released in that territory.

== Other charted songs ==
Title	Year	Peak chart positions	Album
Title	Year	MEX	Album
"Strange Love"	2012	41	Frankenweenie Unleashed!

== Guest appearances ==
Title	Year	Other artist(s)	Album
"Cut Me Up"	2004	Har Mar Superstar	The Handler
"The DNA Will Have Its Say"	2005	Some Girls	The DNA Will Have Its Say
"Hologram World"	2007	Tiny Masters of Today	Bang Bang Boom Cake
"Highway 61 Revisited"	2007	The Million Dollar Bashers	I'm Not There: Original Soundtrack
"Strange Enough"	2009	N.A.S.A., Ol' Dirty Bastard, Fatlip	The Spirit of Apollo
"Watching the Planets"	2009	The Flaming Lips	Embryonic
"Communion"	2010	Maximum Balloon	Maximum Balloon
"If You're Gonna Be Dumb, You Gotta Be Tough"	2010	None	Jackass 3D: Music from the Motion Picture
"Go!"	2012	Santigold	Master of My Make-Believe
"Song for a Warrior"	2012	Swans	The Seer
"Strange Love"	2012	None	Frankenweenie Unleashed!
"The Moon Song" (studio version duet)	2014	Ezra Koenig	"The Moon Song (Music from and Inspired by the Motion Picture Her)" (single)
"The Moon Song" (end title credit)	2014	None	"The Moon Song (Music from and Inspired by the Motion Picture Her)" (single)
"Rattlesnakes"	2014	Walter Martin, Nick Zinner	We're All Young Together
"Sing 2 Me"	2014	Walter Martin	We're All Young Together
"Living in a Trance"	2017	None	Resistance Radio: The Man in the High Castle Album
"Talisa"	2017	Daniele Luppi, Parquet Courts	Milano
"Flush"	2017	Daniele Luppi, Parquet Courts	Milano
"Pretty Prizes"	2017	Daniele Luppi, Parquet Courts	Milano
"The Golden Ones"	2017	Daniele Luppi, Parquet Courts	Milano
"Sorrow Is My Name"	2017	None	Vanity of Vanities: A Tribute to Connie Converse
"Dial D For Devotion"	2020	The Avalanches	We Will Always Love You
