= Rapt (song) =

2014 single by Karen O

Single by Karen O

from the album Crush Songs
- Released: July 28, 2014
- Recorded: 2006–2007
- Genre: Lo-fi
- Length: 1:47
- Label: Cult Records
- Songwriter: Karen O
- Producer: Karen O

Karen O singles chronology
"The Moon Song" (2014)	"Rapt" (2014)	"I Shall Rise" (2015)

Audio sample
- file; help

"Rapt" is a song by American musician Karen O and the second track on her debut studio album, Crush Songs (2014). It was released by Cult Records as the album's lead single on July 28, 2014. Written and produced by Karen O, "Rapt" is a lo-fi song with lyrics about an intense love comparable to the struggles of addiction. Upon release, it did not have a major commercial impact but was well-received by critics. Barnaby Clay, Karen O's husband, directed a music video released simultaneously with the song.

== Background ==
Karen O, a key figure in the garage rock and post-punk revivals of the 2000s, is best known as a member of Yeah Yeah Yeahs. She began writing and recording personal songs as a side project between 2006 and 2007, but this material would remain dormant until 2014, after Yeah Yeah Yeahs went on hiatus. She developed the material into Crush Songs as her solo debut album, which includes "Rapt". It was mixed by Nick Launay and mastered by Bernie Grundman. Its artwork was designed by Karen O and Julian Gross of Liars.

"Rapt" is a lo-fi song with elements of indie rock and alternative rock. Along with Crush Songs's other tracks, it was mostly preserved as it was produced in the late 2000s. It was the second song written for the album, inspired by "someone who became a habit that was hard to kick." A writer for DIY magazine likened it to her previous single, "The Moon Song" from Her, while Al Horner from NME compared its sound to that of the Microphones.

== Release and reception ==
"Rapt" was released as the lead and only single from Crush Songs on July 28, 2014, with a music video directed by Barnaby Clay—Karen O's husband—and produced by K. K. Barrett. On Valentine's Day 2015, Karen O announced a limited edition pink 7-inch vinyl reissue of "Rapt" with a remix by TRZTN. It was packaged with the singer's handwritten notes and a customizable Valentine's card. The song entered the UK Physical Singles Chart on February 21 and spent three weeks on it, peaking at number six.

"Rapt" was well-received by music critics and journalists, many of whom deemed it a standout track of the album. AllMusic's Heather Phares believed it rivaled her solo work to that point, maintaining the "shy sweetness" of Crush Songs "even as O puzzles over her tumbling emotions". Though Laurence Day from The Line of Best Fit was critical of its parent album, he called the song "admittedly fantastic" thanks to its "rhythms", "pace" and "that idiosyncratic sass that O brandishes." NME's Al Horner described it as "a haunting, simple campfire ballad" and "a warming glimpse at another side to the raucous, screaming figure Karen cuts in YYYs. [...] The future feels unwritten again for Karen O – but this time in a good way." Yasmeen Gharnit from Nylon concurred, calling it "an addictive willowy track with a simplistic, daydream-inducing melody." Gharnit also reviewed TRZTN's remix, which she dubbed "just as refreshing in the completely opposite way."

== Track listing ==
Original release

1. "Rapt" – 1:47

7" reissue

1. "Rapt (TRZTN Remix)" – 3:53
2. "Rapt" – 1:47

== Personnel ==
Credits adapted from the liner notes of Crush Songs and "Rapt".

- Julian Gross – design
- Bernie Grundman – mastering
- Nick Launay – mixing
- Karen O – vocals, recording, production, artwork

== Charts ==
Chart performance for "Rapt"
Chart (2015)	Peak position
UK Physical Singles (OCC)	6
