= List of accolades received by Her (film) =

Accolades won by Her (film)

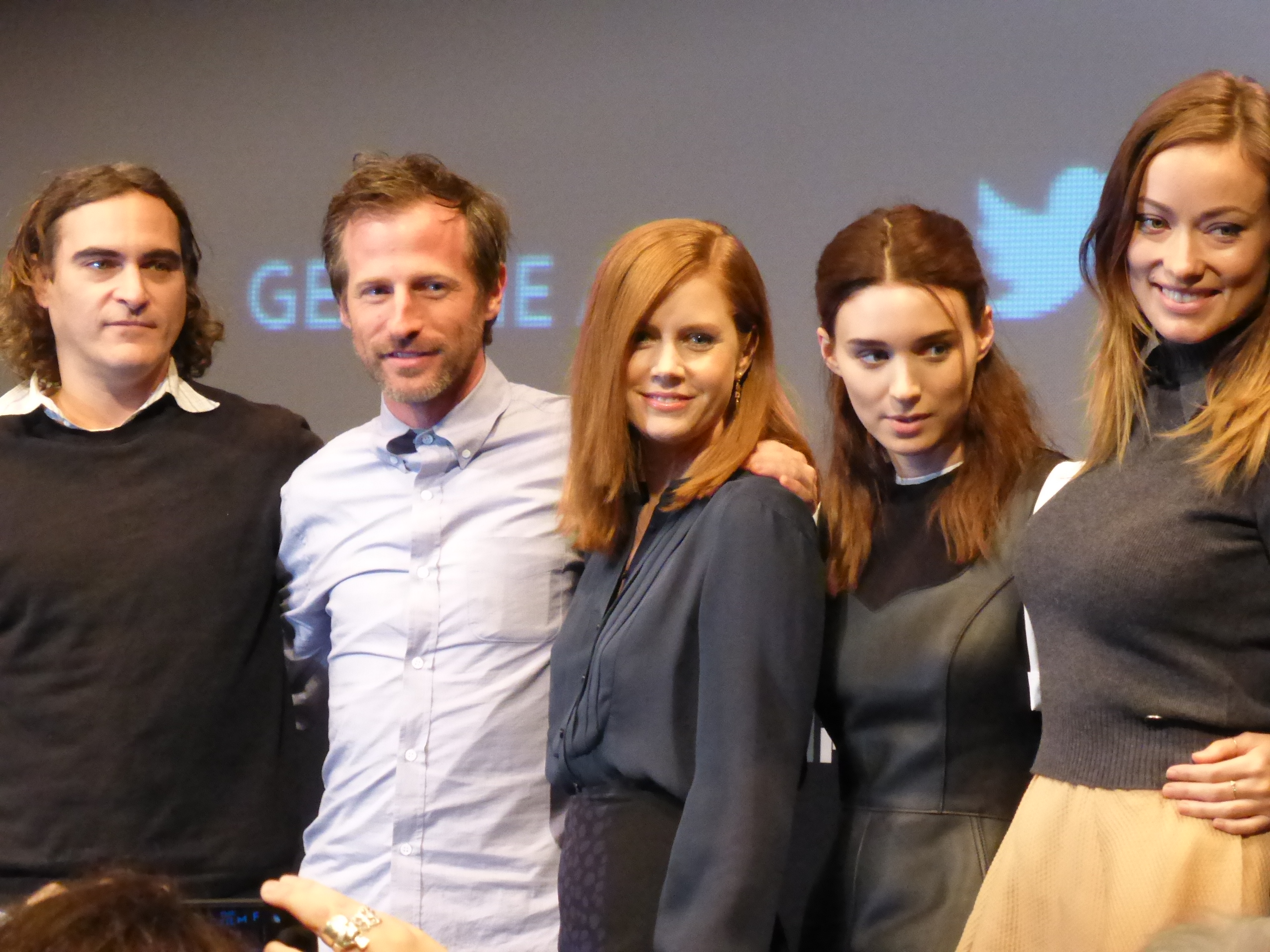
- From left to right: Joaquin Phoenix, Spike Jonze, Amy Adams, Rooney Mara, and Olivia Wilde at the premiere of Her at the 2013 New York Film Festival
Accolades
Award	Won	Nominated
Academy Awards	1	5
Alliance of Women Film Journalists	2	8
American Cinema Editors	0	1
American Film Institute	1	1
Art Directors Guild	1	1
Austin Film Critics Association	4	4
Chicago Film Critics Association	2	7
Critics' Choice Movie Awards	1	6
Detroit Film Critics Society	3	4
Dorian Awards	0	1
Golden Globe Awards	1	3
Grammy Awards	0	1
Location Managers Guild of America	0	1
London Film Critics Circle Awards	0	2
Los Angeles Film Critics Association	2	5
Motion Picture Sound Editors	0	1
National Board of Review	2	2
Online Film Critics Society	1	6
Producers Guild of America Awards	0	1
Rome Film Festival	1	2
San Diego Film Critics Society	3	7
San Francisco Film Critics Circle	0	4
Satellite Awards	0	2
Saturn Awards	3	4
St. Louis Film Critics Association	2	7
Washington D.C. Area Film Critics Association	1	9
Writers Guild of America	1	1
Young Artist Awards	0	1
- Total number of awards and nominations
Totals	33	100
- References

Her is a 2013 American science-fiction romantic drama film written, directed, and produced by Spike Jonze. The film's musical score was composed by Arcade Fire, with the cinematography provided by Hoyte van Hoytema. It marks Jonze's solo screenwriting debut. The film follows Theodore Twombly (Joaquin Phoenix), a man who develops a relationship with Samantha (Scarlett Johansson), a female voice produced by an intelligent computer operating system. The film also stars Amy Adams, Rooney Mara, and Olivia Wilde.

The film premiered at the New York Film Festival on October 12, 2013. Warner Bros. Pictures initially provided a limited release for Her at six theaters on December 18. It was later given a wide release at over 1,700 theaters in the United States and Canada on January 10, 2014. The film grossed a worldwide total of over $47 million on a production budget of $23 million. Rotten Tomatoes, a review aggregator, surveyed 270 reviews and judged 94 percent to be positive.

Her has earned various awards and nominations with particular praise for Jonze's screenplay. The film was also widely praised for its direction, acting (particularly Phoenix and Johansson), cinematography, score, production merits, and poignant material. At the 86th Academy Awards, the film was nominated in five categories, including Best Picture, with Jonze winning for Best Original Screenplay. The film garnered three nominations at the 71st Golden Globe Awards, going on to win Best Screenplay for Jonze. Jonze was also awarded Best Original Screenplay at the 66th Writers Guild of America Awards. Her also won Best Film and Best Director for Jonze at the National Board of Review Awards. The American Film Institute included the film in their list of the top ten films of 2013.

== Accolades ==
Accolades received by Her (film)
Award	Date of ceremony	Category	Recipient(s)	Result	Ref.
Academy Awards	March 2, 2014	Best Picture	Megan Ellison, Spike Jonze and Vincent Landay	Nominated	
Academy Awards	March 2, 2014	Best Original Screenplay	Spike Jonze	Won	
Academy Awards	March 2, 2014	Best Original Score	William Butler and Owen Pallett	Nominated	
Academy Awards	March 2, 2014	Best Original Song	"The Moon Song"; Music by Karen O, Lyrics by Karen O and Spike Jonze	Nominated	
Academy Awards	March 2, 2014	Best Production Design	Production Design: K. K. Barrett; Set Decoration: Gene Serdena	Nominated	
Alliance of Women Film Journalists	December 19, 2013	Best Film	Her	Nominated	
Alliance of Women Film Journalists	December 19, 2013	Best Director (Female or Male)	Spike Jonze	Nominated	
Alliance of Women Film Journalists	December 19, 2013	Best Screenplay, Original	Spike Jonze	Won	
Alliance of Women Film Journalists	December 19, 2013	Best Actress in a Supporting Role	Scarlett Johansson	Nominated	
Alliance of Women Film Journalists	December 19, 2013	Best Actor	Joaquin Phoenix	Nominated	
Alliance of Women Film Journalists	December 19, 2013	Best Music or Score	Arcade Fire	Nominated	
Alliance of Women Film Journalists	December 19, 2013	Unforgettable Moment Award	"Phone sex sequences."	Nominated	
Alliance of Women Film Journalists	December 19, 2013	Best Depiction of Nudity, Sexuality, or Seduction Award	Scarlett Johansson and Joaquin Phoenix	Won	
American Cinema Editors	February 7, 2014	Best Edited Feature Film – Dramatic	Eric Zumbrunnen and Jeff Buchanan	Nominated	
American Film Institute	January 10, 2014	Top Ten Films of the Year	Megan Ellison, Spike Jonze, and Vincent Landay	Won	
Art Directors Guild Awards	February 8, 2014	Excellence in Production Design Award – Contemporary Film	K. K. Barrett	Won	
Austin Film Critics Association	December 17, 2013	Best Film	Her	Won	
Austin Film Critics Association	December 17, 2013	Best Original Screenplay	Spike Jonze	Won	
Austin Film Critics Association	December 17, 2013	Best Score	Arcade Fire	Won	
Austin Film Critics Association	December 17, 2013	Special Honorary Award	Scarlett Johansson (for her outstanding voice performance in Her)	Won	
Chicago Film Critics Association	December 16, 2013	Best Picture	Her	Nominated	
Chicago Film Critics Association	December 16, 2013	Best Director	Spike Jonze	Nominated	
Chicago Film Critics Association	December 16, 2013	Best Supporting Actress	Scarlett Johansson	Nominated	
Chicago Film Critics Association	December 16, 2013	Best Original Screenplay	Spike Jonze	Won	
Chicago Film Critics Association	December 16, 2013	Best Cinematography	Hoyte van Hoytema	Nominated	
Chicago Film Critics Association	December 16, 2013	Best Original Score	Arcade Fire	Won	
Chicago Film Critics Association	December 16, 2013	Best Art Direction/Production Design	Her	Nominated	
Critics' Choice Awards	January 16, 2014	Best Film	Her	Nominated	
Critics' Choice Awards	January 16, 2014	Best Director	Spike Jonze	Nominated	
Critics' Choice Awards	January 16, 2014	Best Supporting Actress	Scarlett Johansson	Nominated	
Critics' Choice Awards	January 16, 2014	Best Original Screenplay	Spike Jonze	Won	
Critics' Choice Awards	January 16, 2014	Best Art Direction	K. K. Barrett and Gene Serdena	Nominated	
Critics' Choice Awards	January 16, 2014	Best Score	Arcade Fire	Nominated	
Detroit Film Critics Society	December 13, 2013	Best Film	Her	Won	
Detroit Film Critics Society	December 13, 2013	Best Director	Spike Jonze	Nominated	
Detroit Film Critics Society	December 13, 2013	Best Screenplay	Spike Jonze	Won	
Detroit Film Critics Society	December 13, 2013	Best Supporting Actress	Scarlett Johansson	Won	
Dorian Awards	January 21, 2014	Film of the Year	Her	Nominated	
Golden Globe Awards	January 12, 2014	Best Motion Picture – Musical or Comedy	Her	Nominated	
Golden Globe Awards	January 12, 2014	Best Actor – Motion Picture Musical or Comedy	Joaquin Phoenix	Nominated	
Golden Globe Awards	January 12, 2014	Best Screenplay	Spike Jonze	Won	
Grammy Awards	February 8, 2015	Best Song Written for Visual Media	"The Moon Song"; Karen O and Spike Jonze	Nominated	
Location Managers Guild of America	March 29, 2014	Outstanding Achievement by a Location Professional – Feature Film	Rick Schuler and Steve Mapel	Nominated	
London Film Critics Circle Awards	February 2, 2014	Film of the Year	Her	Nominated	
London Film Critics Circle Awards	February 2, 2014	Screenwriter of the Year	Spike Jonze	Nominated	
Los Angeles Film Critics Association	December 8, 2013	Best Film	Her (tied with Gravity)	Tied	
Los Angeles Film Critics Association	December 8, 2013	Best Director	Spike Jonze	Runner-up	
Los Angeles Film Critics Association	December 8, 2013	Best Screenplay	Spike Jonze	Runner-up	
Los Angeles Film Critics Association	December 8, 2013	Best Production Design	K. K. Barrett	Won	
Los Angeles Film Critics Association	December 8, 2013	Best Score	Arcade Fire, and Owen Pallett	Runner-up	
Motion Picture Sound Editors Golden Reel Awards	February 16, 2014	Best Sound Editing: Dialogue & ADR in a Feature Film	Ren Klyce	Nominated	
National Board of Review	December 4, 2013	Best Film	Her	Won	
National Board of Review	December 4, 2013	Best Director	Spike Jonze	Won	
Online Film Critics Society	December 16, 2013	Best Picture	Her	Nominated	
Online Film Critics Society	December 16, 2013	Best Director	Spike Jonze	Nominated	
Online Film Critics Society	December 16, 2013	Best Original Screenplay	Spike Jonze	Won	
Online Film Critics Society	December 16, 2013	Best Actor	Joaquin Phoenix	Nominated	
Online Film Critics Society	December 16, 2013	Best Supporting Actress	Scarlett Johansson	Nominated	
Online Film Critics Society	December 16, 2013	Best Editing	Eric Zumbrunnen and Jeff Buchanan	Nominated	
Producers Guild of America Awards	January 19, 2014	Best Theatrical Motion Picture	Megan Ellison, Spike Jonze, and Vincent Landay	Nominated	
Rome Film Festival	November 16, 2013	Best Film	Spike Jonze	Nominated	
Rome Film Festival	November 16, 2013	Best Actress	Scarlett Johansson	Won	
San Diego Film Critics Society	December 11, 2013	Best Film	Her	Won	
San Diego Film Critics Society	December 11, 2013	Best Director	Spike Jonze	Nominated	
San Diego Film Critics Society	December 11, 2013	Best Actor	Joaquin Phoenix	Nominated	
San Diego Film Critics Society	December 11, 2013	Best Original Screenplay	Spike Jonze	Won	
San Diego Film Critics Society	December 11, 2013	Best Editing	Eric Zumbrunnen and Jeff Buchanan	Nominated	
San Diego Film Critics Society	December 11, 2013	Best Production Design	K. K. Barrett	Nominated	
San Diego Film Critics Society	December 11, 2013	Best Score	Arcade Fire	Won	
San Francisco Film Critics Circle	December 15, 2013	Best Director	Spike Jonze	Nominated	
San Francisco Film Critics Circle	December 15, 2013	Best Original Screenplay	Spike Jonze	Nominated	
San Francisco Film Critics Circle	December 15, 2013	Best Cinematography	Hoyte van Hoytema	Nominated	
San Francisco Film Critics Circle	December 15, 2013	Best Production Design	K. K. Barrett	Nominated	
Satellite Awards	February 23, 2014	Best Original Screenplay	Spike Jonze	Nominated	
Satellite Awards	February 23, 2014	Best Original Score	Arcade Fire	Nominated	
Saturn Awards	June 18, 2014	Best Fantasy Film	Her	Won	
Saturn Awards	June 18, 2014	Best Actor	Joaquin Phoenix	Nominated	
Saturn Awards	June 18, 2014	Best Supporting Actress	Scarlett Johansson	Won	
Saturn Awards	June 18, 2014	Best Writing	Spike Jonze	Won	
St. Louis Film Critics Association	December 16, 2013	Best Film	Her	Nominated	
St. Louis Film Critics Association	December 16, 2013	Best Director	Spike Jonze	Nominated	
St. Louis Film Critics Association	December 16, 2013	Best Original Screenplay	Spike Jonze	Won	
St. Louis Film Critics Association	December 16, 2013	Best Supporting Actress	Scarlett Johansson	Nominated	
St. Louis Film Critics Association	December 16, 2013	Best Musical Score	Arcade Fire	Won	
St. Louis Film Critics Association	December 16, 2013	Best Art Direction	Austin Gorg	Runner-up	
St. Louis Film Critics Association	December 16, 2013	Best Scene	"OS sex scene"	Nominated	
Washington D.C. Area Film Critics Association	December 9, 2013	Best Film	Her	Nominated	
Washington D.C. Area Film Critics Association	December 9, 2013	Best Director	Spike Jonze	Nominated	
Washington D.C. Area Film Critics Association	December 9, 2013	Best Original Screenplay	Spike Jonze	Won	
Washington D.C. Area Film Critics Association	December 9, 2013	Best Actor	Joaquin Phoenix	Nominated	
Washington D.C. Area Film Critics Association	December 9, 2013	Best Supporting Actress	Scarlett Johansson	Nominated	
Washington D.C. Area Film Critics Association	December 9, 2013	Best Art Direction	K. K. Barrett and Gene Serdena	Nominated	
Washington D.C. Area Film Critics Association	December 9, 2013	Best Cinematography	Hoyte van Hoytema	Nominated	
Washington D.C. Area Film Critics Association	December 9, 2013	Best Editing	Eric Zumbrunnen and Jeff Buchanan	Nominated	
Washington D.C. Area Film Critics Association	December 9, 2013	Best Original Score	Arcade Fire	Nominated	
Writers Guild of America Awards	February 1, 2014	Best Original Screenplay	Spike Jonze	Won	
Young Artist Awards	May 4, 2014	Best Supporting Young Actress in a Feature Film	Grace Prewitt	Nominated	

== See also ==
- 2013 in film
