= Bang Bang Boom Cake =

Studio album by Tiny Masters of Today
- Released: August 6, 2007
- Recorded: 2007
- Genre: Alternative rock; indie rock; punk rock
- Length: 30:21
- Label: Mute Records
- Producer: Russell Simins

Tiny Masters of Today chronology
K.I.D.S. (2006)	Bang Bang Boom Cake (2007)	Skeletons (2009)

Professional ratings
Review scores
Source	Rating
AllMusic	3.5/5 stars
The Observer	3/5 stars

Bang Bang Boom Cake is the debut album by punk rock band Tiny Masters of Today.

== Track list ==
1. "K.I.D.S."
2. "Stickin' It to the Man"
3. "Hey, Mr. DJ"
4. "Disco Bomb"
5. "Hologram World"
6. "Pictures"
7. "Radio Riot"
8. "Trendsetter"
9. "Book Song"
10. "Texas"
11. "Bushy"
12. "End of My Rope"
13. "Tooty Frooty (Clarke's Dream Song)"

== Personnel ==
- Ivan: vocals, guitar
- Ada: vocals, bass guitar, keyboards, percussion
- Russell Simins: drums

== Additional personnel ==
- Karen O: vocals on "Hologram World"
- Nick Zinner: guitar on "Hologram World"
- Fred Schneider: vocals on "Disco Bomb"
- Kimya Dawson: vocals on "Trendsetter", Backing Vocals On "Book Song"
- Angelo Spencer: lead guitar on "Trendsetter"
- DJ Atsushi Numata: sound effects on "Hey, Mr. DJ"
- Gibby Haynes: vocals on "Texas"
