= Christian Joy =

American costume designer and artist

Christiane Joy Hultquist (born December 22, 1973) is an American fashion designer and artist known for designing costumes for Yeah Yeah Yeahs lead singer and lyricist Karen O. Using found articles and occasionally eschewing thread and print for glue and marker pens, she has influenced contemporary fashion with punk and do-it-yourself stylings.

== Life and career ==
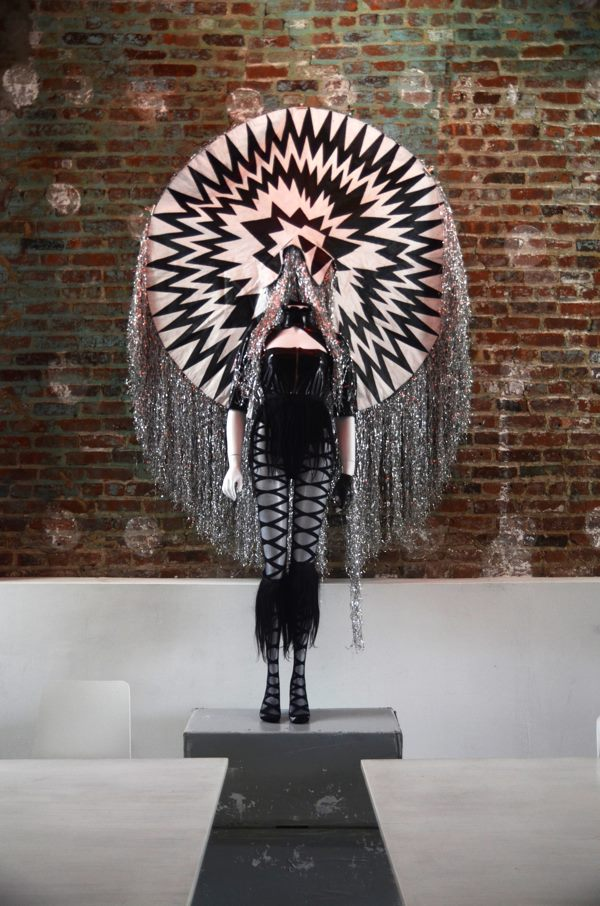
Costume by Christian Joy

Joy was born in Marion, Iowa, US. She started designing in Brooklyn, N.Y.C. in 2000. With no formal training in fashion design, she started creating one-of-a-kind hand-painted/hand-sewn t-shirts and redesigning old prom dresses.

She met Karen O in 2001 and the aspiring singer soon became her favorite model. As her band Yeah Yeah Yeahs began playing shows, Joy designed a fresh outfit for each occasion. As the band's fame grew, so did Joy's reputation and by September 2002 she mounted a solo show Brat Style during New York Fashion Week.

In July 2004 Joy and her designs were a key element of a New York Times Sunday magazine feature about the growing influence of Indie Rock on fashion. In June 2005 Joy was again featured in Nylon in an article entitled 'Quiet Riot'.

In 2007 her costume designs were featured at the Victoria & Albert Museum in London as part of the New York Fashion Now exhibit.

In 2008 Joy took on dressing UK band Klaxons persuading them to give up their trademark neon outfits. She collaborated with TopShop on three limited-edition collections, and released her first personal ready-to-wear garments. Also in 2008 Joy contributed to Carrie Borzillo-Vrenna's book Cherry Bomb, mentioning John Waters as a style inspiration.

In Feb 2009 Joy had her first solo exhibition, The Visitors Must Be Amused, at the AVA gallery in NYC. Joy asked associates to write a description of a female being and then designed a costume representing each definition, including one of an alien goddess gown with a whip. In September 2009 Joy costumes were featured in a Where The Wild Things Are pop-up shop in Los Angeles.

In 2011 Joy created the costumes for Stop the Virgens a "psycho opera" created by Karen O and KK Barrett

In May 2012 Joy presented Do Androids Dream of Electric Shrimp? at the Diesel Art Gallery in Tokyo. The exhibition was a combination of past Karen O costumes, new "Kite Costumes", videos featuring Joy's designs and poster and textile prints. In November 2012 the exhibition was moved to New York City, where it was held at Picture Farm Gallery in Williamsburg, Brooklyn.

Joy has also created costumes for Santigold and Danish singer/songwriter Oh Land.

In September 2013 Joy mounted an art installation show Bok Joy at Secret Project Robot in Brooklyn.

== Press ==
Joy received her first major press in the June–July 2003 issue of Nylon magazine in a feature article - 'Even Odds' written by Johanna Lenander - on her Karen O wardrobe. In August 2003 Joy, in a Time profile, scoffed at her It girl status. December 2005's ELLE introduced Christian Joy as a guru of 'DIY' Fashion. A follow-up piece in April 2006 reinforced her status. In January 2010 Joy's costumes appeared in a photo spread in The Block's Fame issue. In the accompanying interview, Joy discussed abandoning mass fashion for the DIY approach of using Etsy as her exclusive store. She is also featured in the German fashion blog Two For Fashion.

In February 2010 Joy was featured on the cover of Time Out's Most Stylish New Yorkers. In October 2011, Joy featured in T magazine's "The Look of Karen O's Psycho Rock Opera" by Katie Chang. In March 2017, Joy featured in Nick Zinner's "Do Androids Dream of Electric Shrimp?" for The Japan Times by Misha Janette and Samuel Thomas.
