= Stadium Cake =

Studio album by Oh Pep!
- Released: 1 July 2016
- Studio: Echo Lake
- Genre: Folk-pop
- Length: 43:54
- Labels: Barely Dressed Records (Australia and New Zealand); Dualtone Records (North America); Star House Collective (Europe)

Oh Pep! chronology
| Living (2015) | Stadium Cake (2016) | I Wasn't Only Thinking About You... (2018) |

Stadium Cake is the debut studio album by Australian folk-pop band Oh Pep! It was released on 1 July 2016 and peaked at No. 20 on the ARIA Hitseekers Albums Chart.

== Background ==
Oh Pep! consists of two members, Olivia Hally and Pepita Emmerichs. While producing Stadium Cake, the band sought to explore different musical styles to their previous EPs. Hally said in 2015, "We're more aware now of exactly what we want with our sound, and for that matter exploring sounds that we haven't used before ... There's more of a pop influence this time, some rock." Stadium Cake was recorded in Nova Scotia, and the band worked in multi-track for the first time.

== Reception ==
Stadium Cake peaked at No. 20 on the ARIA Hitseekers Albums Chart, which is a component of the standard ARIA Albums Chart.

Professional ratings
Review scores
| Source | Rating |
|---|---|
| Exclaim! | 7/10 |
| Rolling Stone Australia | 3/5 stars |

Stadium Cake was generally received favourably by music critics. Bob Boilen, who had championed the band since their appearance at the 2015 Americana Music Festival, wrote that Stadium Cake "expands on Hally and Emmerichs' talents, to the point where it surprised me how detailed and intricate they are as both players and listeners." Bryan Hood, writing for The Village Voice, described it as an "engaging album of folk-pop, one that'll be good for fans of the genre to put on repeat this summer."

Kyle Mullin for Exclaim! called the album "accomplished enough to leave a mark of its own on future folk and indie pop artists." Doug Wallen for Rolling Stone Australia wrote that the album's best moments "retain the Melbourne duo’s folky intimacy, even as they stretch their sound every which way", and in particular praised the track "Doctor Doctor", which "nails Taylor Swift's pop smarts and sloganeering alike."

The album's lead single, "Doctor Doctor", received worldwide airplay. It ranked at #36 on CBC Music's top 100 radio songs of 2016. The track also appeared in season one of the television program The Bold Type. Stephen Goodhew, music director of FBi Radio in Sydney, Australia, included "Doctor Doctor" among the year's top 10 songs, writing: "Being honest with yourself is something that I think a lot of people struggle with and it’s a theme the duo tackle head on here. With lyrics and melodies this strong, I can’t help but feel like this band is criminally under-appreciated in our own country." Collin Brennan for Consequence of Sound praised the track "Bushwick" as "pop at its most kinetic."

== Track listing ==
Stadium Cake RMT/Independent (BARELY007CD)
| No. | Title | Length |
|---|---|---|
| 1. | "Bushwick" | 3:11 |
| 2. | "Wanting" | 3:10 |
| 3. | "Crazy Feels" | 4:53 |
| 4. | "Doctor Doctor" | 3:16 |
| 5. | "Trouble Now" | 3:24 |
| 6. | "Tea, Milk & Honey" | 5:22 |
| 7. | "Only Everyone" | 3:38 |
| 8. | "The Situation" | 4:23 |
| 9. | "Happenstance" | 3:24 |
| 10. | "The Race" | 2:52 |
| 11. | "Seven Babies" | 3:01 |
| 12. | "Afterwards" | 3:20 |
| Total length: | | 43:54 |
