= Oh Pep! =

Australian indie folk band

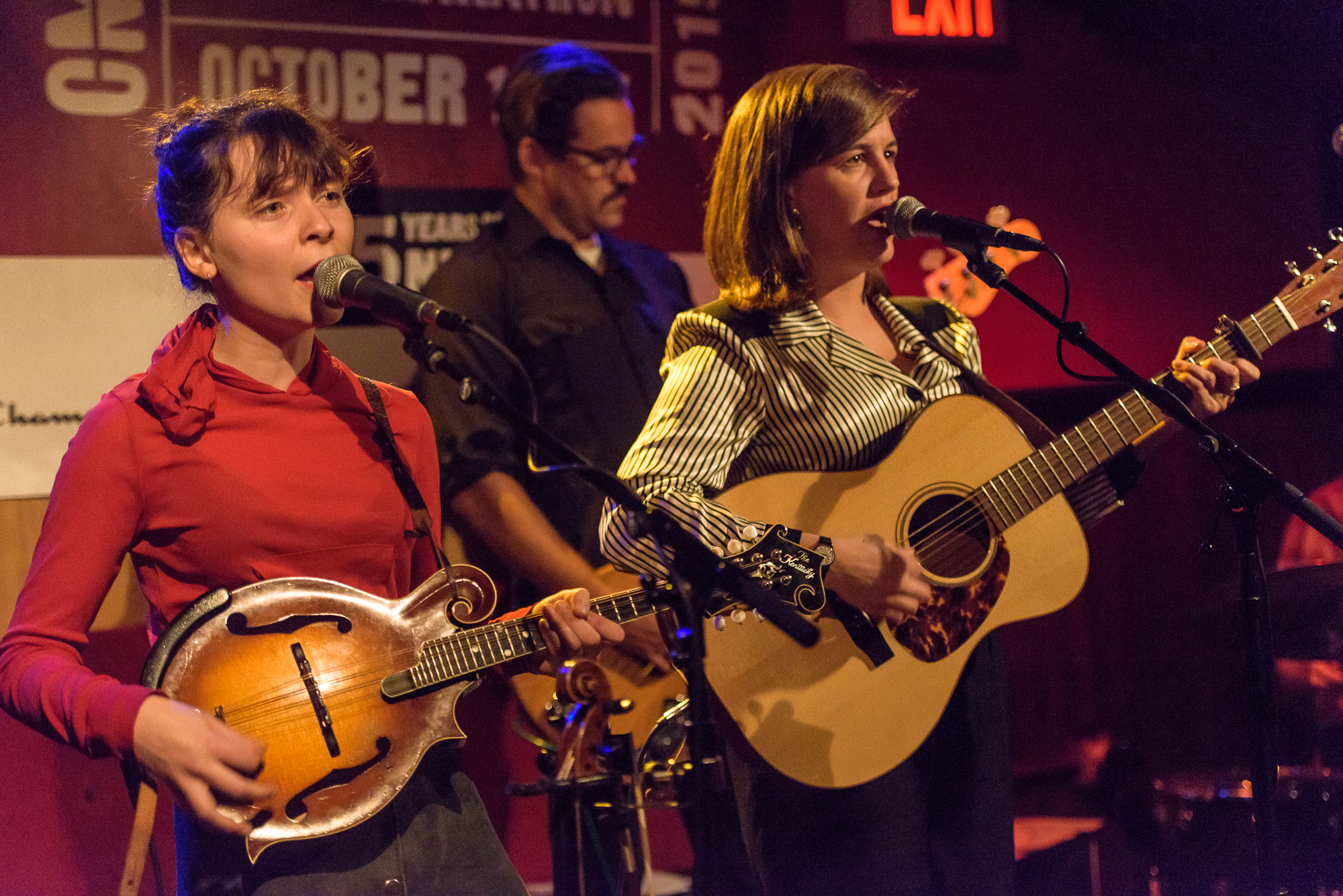
- Pepita Emmerichs (left) and Olivia Hally perform as Oh Pep! at the 2015 CMJ Music Marathon in New York City.

Background information
- Origin: Melbourne, Australia
- Genre: pop
- Years active: 2009–present
- Members: Olivia Hally; Pepita Emmerichs

Oh Pep! are an Australian band formed in Melbourne, Australia by Olivia Hally (vocals, guitar) and Pepita Emmerichs (violin, mandolin). Their debut album, Stadium Cake, was released on 24 June 2016.

Emmerichs characterised her band's musical style as "folk/pop/country with bluegrass instrumentation". She has cited among the band's influences Paul Kelly, Ryan Adams, Gillian Welch, Andrew Bird, Leonard Cohen, Bob Dylan, Johnny Cash, Glen Hansard, Elbow, Bright Eyes and Arcade Fire. Christine Campbell of Lip Magazine called their music "an original mix of different kinds of folk, pop, indie and more." NPR Music's Bob Boilen, after seeing Oh Pep! perform at the 2015 CMJ Music Marathon, praised their songs as "charming ... with lyrical and structural twists and turns."

== Career ==
=== 2009-2015: Formation and early releases ===
The duo met at the Victorian College of the Arts Secondary School in 2009, and began writing songs together. In mid-2011, their musical duo, known as Oh Pep!, expanded into a five-piece lineup with Stuart West (double bass), Paddy Montgomery (mandolin, bouzouki) and Justin Olsson (drums, percussion). The band's line-up has changed several times since, with Hally and Emmerichs the constant factor in all line-up configurations.

Pepita Emmerichs was also a child actress, who had appeared in Spike Jonze's 2009 film Where the Wild Things Are as Claire, the protagonist's older sister.

The band's self-titled debut EP, which was entirely self-produced and funded, was released on 6 September 2012. Their second EP, II, was released on 10 October 2013.

In January 2013, Oh Pep! covered Paul Simon's Graceland in its entirety as part of the event "RocKwiz presents Pure Pop's Summer of Classic Albums". In November 2014, the band performed as a showcase act at the Australasian Worldwide Music Expo.

Oh Pep! released their third EP, Living, on 21 August 2015, through Star House Collective. Oh Pep! performed at the 2015 Americana Music Festival & Conference in Nashville, Tennessee, where Pop Matters' listed them as one of the event's "unquestionable standouts", writing that "seeing Oh Pep! is one of those times when the crowd realizes they're seeing future stars for the first time."

Oh Pep! also performed at the 2015 CMJ Music Marathon, where they received praise from NPR Music's Bob Boilen, The New York Times' Jon Pareles, and the KCRW Music Blog. In October 2015, Hally and Emmerichs performed as Oh Pep! for NPR Music's Tiny Desk Concerts series.

=== 2016-present: Stadium Cake & I Wasn't Only Thinking About You... ===
The band's debut album, Stadium Cake, was released on 24 June 2016. (Note: Stadium Cake was released on Dualtone Records in North America, Star House Collective in Europe, and Barely Dressed Records in Australia and New Zealand.)

For Stadium Cake, Oh Pep! sought to explore different musical styles. According to Hally, "We're more aware now of exactly what we want with our sound, and for that matter exploring sounds that we haven't used before. [...] There's more of a pop influence this time, some rock." In their review of the band's debut album, The Village Voice described the Oh Pep! sound as "starting off slow and spare — all delicate strumming and hushed vocals — it soon grows into something fast, boisterous, and baroque [...] From the get-go it's clear that Stadium Cake is a pop album."

The band's music featured in the 2017 short film Martha The Monster, directed by Christopher Weekes. "Doctor Doctor" also appeared in season one of the television series The Bold Type.

== Discography ==
=== Studio albums ===
List of studio albums, with selected details
Title	Album details
Stadium Cake	Released: 1 July 2016; Label: Barely Dressed (BARELY005); Formats: CD, LP, digital download
I Wasn't Only Thinking About You...	Released: 26 October 2018; Label: People Speak; Formats: CD, LP, digital download, streaming

=== EPs ===
List of EP, with selected details
Title	Album details
Oh Pep!	Released: 6 September 2012; Label: Oh Pep!; Formats: CD, digital download
II	Released: October 2013; Label: Stadium Cake Records; Formats: CD, digital download
Living	Released: November 2015; Label: Barely Dressed (BARELY004); Formats: CD, LP, digital download
Oh Pep! On Audio Tree Live	Released: October 2016; Label: AudioTree; Formats: digital download

== Awards and nominations ==
=== Music Victoria Awards ===
The Music Victoria Awards (previously known as The Age EG Awards and The Age Music Victoria Awards) are an annual awards night celebrating Victorian music.

Year	Nominee / work	Award	Result
Music Victoria Awards of 2014	II	Best Folk Roots Album	Nominated
Music Victoria Awards of 2015	Living	Best Folk Roots Album	Nominated
Music Victoria Awards of 2016	Stadium Cake	Best Folk Roots Album	Won

=== National Live Music Awards ===
The National Live Music Awards (NLMAs) are a broad recognition of Australia's diverse live industry, celebrating the success of the Australian live scene. The awards commenced in 2016.

Year	Nominee / work	Award	Result
National Live Music Awards of 2019	Themselves	International Live Achievement (Group)	Nominated

=== Other awards ===
- In April 2014, Oh Pep! were named "Young Folk Performer of the Year" at the National Folk Festival in Canberra.
