= Tigertrap Records =

- Founded: 2005; 21 years ago
- Founder: Tom Edwards; Adie Nunn; Gill Barker
- Distributor: Shellshock
- Genre: Alternative rock Punk rock Indie rock
- Country of origin: United Kingdom
- Location: London, England
- Official website: www.tigertrap.co.uk

Tigertrap Records is a London-based record label, which was set up in late 2005 by Drowned in Sound writers Tom Edwards and Adie Nunn. The label released a series of singles through 2006, concentrating on unbroken talent. During this time, former Warp Records employee Gill Barker joined to manage the label's business affairs. Their first single, 586's We Got Bored became a sizeable indie club hit and NME awarded it 'Runner Up Single of the Week' in May '06. The second release was Lowlife by Scanners, which went on to be featured in a Jeff Bridges film, Mama's Boy. The band released their debut album on Dim Mak (home to Bloc Party, The Rakes, etc.).

Later that year their Brooklyn-based pre-teen brother/sister duo Tiny Masters of Today were featured in Newsweek and on the covers of Artrocker magazine and New York Times. The band, featuring guest drummer Russell Simins of The Jon Spencer Blues Explosion, signed to Mute Records worldwide in 2007 and released a critically acclaimed album, Bang Bang Boom Cake.

In 2007 the label signed former Symposium songwriter Wojtek Godzisz, whose EP 'Burning Ideals' was their first official CD release. That January also saw the departure of Adie Nunn to singles label/promoter Club Fandango. Tigertrap completed its run of singles deals in March '07 and began working towards albums with its current roster Clone Quartet, Infants, Untitled Musical Project and Wojtek Godzisz.

== Artist roster ==
- Applicants
- Clone Quartet
- The Far Cries
- 586
- Wojtek Godzisz
- Infants
- It Hugs Back
- Look See Proof
- Mock Orange
- The Patty Winters Show
- Popular Workshop
- Scanners
- Tiny Masters of Today
- Untitled Musical Project

== See also ==
- List of record labels
