= Lux Prima =

Studio album by Karen O and Danger Mouse
- Released: March 15, 2019
- Genre: Psychedelic rock; orchestral pop; trip hop
- Length: 40:42
- Label: BMG
- Producer: Danger Mouse

Karen O chronology
Crush Songs (2014)	Lux Prima (2019)

Danger Mouse chronology
After the Disco (2014)	Lux Prima (2019)	Cheat Codes (2022)

Professional ratings
Aggregate scores
Source	Rating
AnyDecentMusic?	7.5/10
Metacritic	79/100
Review scores
Source	Rating
AllMusic	4/5 stars
Clash	7/10
Consequence	B+
Crack	4/10
DIY	5/5 stars
The Guardian	3/5 stars
The Irish Times	4/5 stars
musicOMH	4.5/5 stars
Pitchfork	7.3/10
Rolling Stone	4/5 stars

Lux Prima is a collaborative studio album by American singer-songwriter Karen O of the Yeah Yeah Yeahs and Danger Mouse. It was released in March 2019 under BMG Records.

== Composition ==
With Lux Prima, the duo craft "sprawling, soulful [and] cinematic" psych rock. 1960s orchestral pop and the "packed and dusty" sound of 1990s trip hop are also worked in. Other styles featured include disco, funk, soul, and lounge-pop.

== Reception ==
Lux Prima was well received by critics upon release. The Guardian called it "complex and lingering", praising Karen O's songwriting in particular. Pitchfork also praised the album, recognizing Karen O and Danger Mouse had "concocted a lush, vivid world on their dreamy and poignant collaboration". Pitchfork did criticize the choruses on the record, saying "Lux Prima works better as a journey than a destination"..."that never sounds better when going nowhere fast." They awarded the album a score of 7.3.

== Track listing ==
All music produced by Danger Mouse.

No.	Title	Writer(s)	Length
1.	"Lux Prima"	Karen Orzolek; Brian Burton; Sam Cohen	9:02
2.	"Ministry"	Orzolek; Burton; Cohen; Héctor Delgado	5:06
3.	"Turn the Light"	Orzolek; Burton; Cohen	3:19
4.	"Woman"	Orzolek; Burton	2:54
5.	"Redeemer"	Orzolek; Burton	3:49
6.	"Drown"	Orzolek; Burton	3:26
7.	"Leopard's Tongue"	Orzolek; Burton; Cohen; David Christian	3:13
8.	"Reveries"	Orzolek; Burton	3:44
9.	"Nox Lumina"	Orzolek; Burton	6:09
Total length:			40:42

== Personnel ==
Sourced from AllMusic.

Karen O & Danger Mouse

- Karen Orzolek - lead & background vocals (all tracks), synthesizers (tracks 4, 6), electric guitar (track 6), acoustic guitar (tracks 8, 9); string arrangements
- Brian Burton - background vocals (tracks 2, 6), synth bass (tracks 1, 2), Wurlitzer (tracks 1, 2, 7), synthesizers (tracks 1, 3–5, 7–9), percussion (tracks 1, 3, 4, 6, 9), drum programming (tracks 2, 3), electric guitar (tracks 2, 3), acoustic guitar (tracks 2, 3, 9), bass (tracks 2, 4, 8, 9), drums (track 4), strings (track 6), organ (track 7), Mellotron (track 8), programming (track 8); horn & string arrangements

Additional musicians

- Sam Cohen - bass (tracks 1–4, 6–8), electric guitar (tracks 1–3, 5–7), synthesizer (tracks 1, 3), drums (track 2)
- David Christian - drums (tracks 1 [parts I and IV], 4–7)
- Héctor Delgado - drum programming (tracks 2, 3)
- Jared Samuel - piano (track 4), Wurlitzer (track 5), Rhodes (track 6)
- Nick Zinner - electric guitars (tracks 4, 8)
- Daniele Luppi - string arrangements, string conductor
  - Mei Chang, Sharon Jackson, Marina Manukian, Cameron Patrick, Benjamin Powell, Kathleen Robertson, Erika Walczak - violin
  - Adriana Zoppo - viola
  - Stefanie Fife - cello
- Chris Tedesco - music contractor, trombone & trumpet (tracks 1, 5, 6)

== Charts ==
Chart performance for Lux Prima
Chart (2019)	Peak position
Australian Digital Albums (ARIA)	28
Belgian Albums (Ultratop Flanders)	104
French Albums (SNEP)	173
Scottish Albums (OCC)	17
UK Albums (OCC)	35
US Indie Store Album Sales (Billboard)	1
