= Crush Songs =

Studio album by Karen O
- Released: September 5, 2014
- Recorded: 2006–2010
- Genres: Lo-fi; alternative rock; indie rock
- Length: 25:25
- Label: Cult
- Producer: Karen O

Karen O chronology
Where the Wild Things Are (2009)	Crush Songs (2014)	Live from Crush Palace (2015)

Singles from Crush Songs
- 1. "Rapt" Released: July 28, 2014

Crush Songs is the debut studio album by American singer and songwriter Karen O. It was released on September 5, 2014 by Cult Records. It was initially recorded as a side project of Karen O, best known as the lead vocalist of the band Yeah Yeah Yeahs, between 2006 and 2010. After the band's 2014 hiatus, she developed the material into a full album. Musically, Crush Songs is a lo-fi album featuring acoustic instrumentation and lyrics about her experiences with love and its uncertainty.

Crush Songs charted in six territories upon release, debuting at number 44 on the US Billboard 200 and number 61 on the UK Albums Chart. Critics praised its emotive composition and Karen O's vocals, but felt the album sounded incomplete. For promotion, "Rapt" was released as the only single, and the singer embarked on a mini tour from August to October 2014. A live album followed in 2015.

== Background and recording ==
Singer and songwriter Karen O rose to prominence in the 2000s as a member of Yeah Yeah Yeahs, becoming a key figure in the garage rock and post-punk revivals of the decade. After beginning production of band's second album, Show Your Bones (2006), and an internet leak of a demo she created years prior, she began writing and recording personal songs as a side project in her New York apartment from 2006 to 2010. However, this material went untouched as Karen O continued to make music with the band and contribute to film soundtracks.

After achieving their highest charting album in the United States with Mosquito (2013), Yeah Yeah Yeahs announced a break due to a lack of inspiration. During their hiatus, Karen O unearthed the material and developed it into her first solo effort, which she titled Crush Songs. The tracks were preserved mostly in the state they were recorded and produced, with Nick Launay and Bernie Grundman handling later mixing and mastering respectively. Its artwork was designed by Julian Gross of Liars and Yong Kok Kim, her grandfather, which depicts Karen O kissing partners at different ages. The singer also contributed custom sketches, drawings, and handwritten lyrics.

== Music and lyrics ==
"NYC Baby"
Sample of "NYC Baby", the shortest track from the album

Crush Songs is an independent lo-fi album that blends the alternative and indie rock genres. The New York Times's Melena Ryzik labeled it "very nearly a concept album". It is characterized by acoustic guitars, no percussion—with the exception of "Body", featuring a drum track composed of Karen O's mouth sounds—and hushed vocals. Its minimal elements result in what Will Hermes observes as an "intimate" and "unpolished" sound, which Al Horner from NME thought evoked the Microphones.

Each of the tracks on Crush Songs are under three minutes and "generally about six, seven sentences" each, with "NYC Baby" being its shortest track at fifty-six seconds and "Beast" its longest at two minutes and fifty-seven seconds. Its lyrics explores themes of romance and its uncertainty, reflected in Karen O's autographical writing. She penned every song on the record except for "Indian Summer" written by Jim Morrison and Robby Krieger of the Doors, and "Singalong" co-written with Dean Fertita and Jack Lawrence of the Raconteurs. Karen O was influenced by Michael Jackson, writing "King" as a homage, and Connie Francis. Lyrics from "Comes the Night" are engraved on the wedding bands of her and Barnaby Clay, her husband.

== Release ==
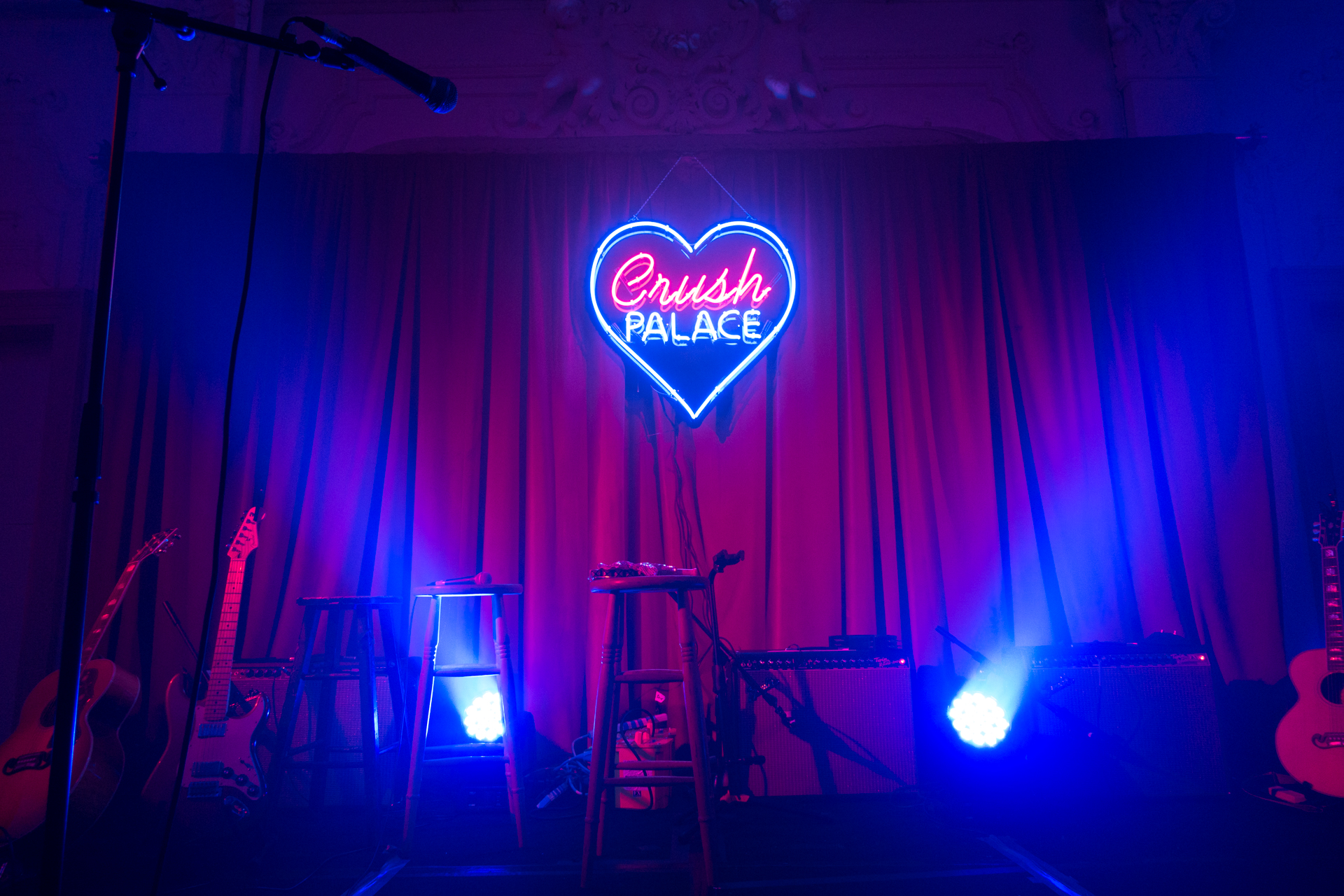
Karen O embarked on a mini tour for Crush Songs in decorated venues

To distribute Crush Songs, Karen O signed with Cult Records, an independent label founded by the Strokes frontman Julian Casablancas, The pair were mutual fans of each other in the 2000s rock scene, and she credited Casablancas for giving her the courage to release the project. The album was announced on June 25, 2014, and promoted with a series of listening parties and a mini tour that ran from August to October 2014; she also created Instagram and Twitter accounts, realizing that "I just have no concept, outside the Yeah Yeah Yeahs, of me as an entity."

"Rapt" was released as a single on July 28, 2014 and accompanied by a music video directed by Barnaby Clay, Karen O's husband. Crush Songs was released on September 5, 2014 in a limited vinyl edition with her handwritten notes and sketches; this was followed by CD and streaming distribution that same week. On February 10, 2015, Karen O released the live album Live From Crush Palace, which contains recordings from three shows she performed at Hollywood Forever Cemetery and two songs from her film projects.

== Reception ==
Professional ratings
Aggregate scores
Source	Rating
Metacritic	65/100
Review scores
Source	Rating
AllMusic	3.5/5 stars
The A.V. Club	C+
Clash	6/10
Entertainment Weekly	B
The Guardian	3/5 stars
NME	7/10
Pitchfork	5.8/10
Rolling Stone	3.5/5 stars

Crush Songs was received favorably and charted in six territories. In the United States, it debuted at number 44 on the US Billboard 200, number ten on the Independent Albums chart, number eight on the Top Alternative Albums chart, and number fourteen on the Top Rock Albums chart. In the United Kingdom, it debuted at number 61 on the UK Albums Chart and number eleven on the UK Independent Albums Chart, with first-week sales of 1,336 copies in the territory. In Scotland, it debuted also at number 61 on the Scottish Albums Chart.

At Metacritic, which assigns a normalized rating out of 100 to reviews from mainstream publications, Crush Songs received an average score of 65 based on 31 reviews, indicating a "generally favorable" reception. While calling it a strange debut, AllMusic concluded that it showcased some of the best elements of Karen O's solo music. Writers at Clash greatly praised Crush Songs's composition and Karen O's vocals, but felt that the songs were underwhelming and unrealized. Journalists at Entertainment Weekly and Pitchfork were shocked at how small the album sounded, even deeming it too modest. These sentiments were echoed by publications like The A.V. Club, The Guardian, Rolling Stone, and NME.

== Track listing ==
All tracks written by Karen O, except "Indian Summer", written by Jim Morrison and Robby Krieger, and "Singalong", written by Karen O, Jack Lawrence and Dean Fertita.

Crush Songs track listing
No.	Title	Length
1.	"Ooo"	1:28
2.	"Rapt"	1:47
3.	"Visits"	1:33
4.	"Beast"	2:57
5.	"Comes the Night"	1:06
6.	"NYC Baby"	0:56
7.	"Other Side"	1:11
8.	"So Far"	1:33
9.	"Day Go By"	2:16
10.	"Body"	2:27
11.	"King"	1:23
12.	"Indian Summer"	1:03
13.	"Sunset Sun"	1:12
14.	"Native Korean Rock"	2:27
15.	"Singalong"	2:06
Total length:		25:25

== Personnel ==
Credits adapted from the liner notes of Crush Songs.

- Dean Fertita – backing vocals (track 15)
- Julian Gross – design
- Bernie Grundman – mastering
- Yong Kok Kim – young Karen portrait
- Nick Launay – mixing
- Jack Lawrence – backing vocals (track 15)
- Karen O – vocals, recording, production, artwork
- Imaad Wasif – guitar (tracks 3, 8)

== Charts ==
Chart performance for Crush Songs
Chart (2014)	Peak position
Australian Hitseekers Albums (ARIA)	6
Belgian Albums (Ultratop Flanders)	81
Belgian Albums (Ultratop Wallonia)	184
Irish Albums (IRMA)	72
Irish Independent Albums (IRMA)	11
Scottish Albums (OCC)	61
UK Albums (OCC)	61
UK Independent Albums (OCC)	11
US Billboard 200	44
US Independent Albums (Billboard)	10
US Top Alternative Albums (Billboard)	8
US Top Rock Albums (Billboard)	14
