= Where the Wild Things Are (soundtrack) =

2009 soundtrack album by Karen O and the Kids

Where the Wild Things Are: Motion Picture Soundtrack

Soundtrack album by Karen O and the Kids
- Released: September 29, 2009
- Studios: Beer Wine Fish, Infrasonic Sound (Echo Park, California); The Boat (Silver Lake, California); The Sound Factory, Sunset Sound (Hollywood, California); Stay Gold (Brooklyn, New York); Stratosphere Sound (Manhattan, New York)
- Genre: Indie rock
- Length: 39:53
- Labels: DGC; Interscope
- Producers: Carter Burwell; Karen O; tbiller

Karen O albums chronology
Where the Wild Things Are: Motion Picture Soundtrack (2009)	Crush Songs (2014)

Singles from Where the Wild Things Are: Motion Picture Soundtrack
- 1. "All Is Love" Released: August 25, 2009

Where the Wild Things Are: Motion Picture Soundtrack: Original Songs by Karen O and the Kids is the soundtrack album to the 2009 film Where the Wild Things Are. It is performed by Karen O and the Kids. It was released on September 29, 2009, in CD, LP, and digital download formats.

== Background ==
Karen O, the vocalist of the indie rock band Yeah Yeah Yeahs, wrote the film's soundtrack. Her bandmates Brian Chase and Nick Zinner and former touring guitarist Imaad Wasif, Deerhunter's Bradford Cox, Liars' Aaron Hemphill, the Dead Weather's Dean Fertita, and Jack Lawrence from The Raconteurs all also contributed.

When director Spike Jonze approached Karen O to write the soundtrack to Where the Wild Things Are, he cited the Langley Schools Music Project's Innocence & Despair as an example of the desired "simple melodies that were emotionally complex—something that both kids and adults would appreciate".

"All Is Love" was released as the soundtrack's lead single on August 25, 2009, and is featured in the credits of the film.

== Reception ==
Professional ratings
Aggregate scores
Source	Rating
Metacritic	77/100
Review scores
Source	Rating
AllMusic	4/5 stars
Classic Rock	8/10 stars
Drowned in Sound	8/10
Entertainment Weekly	B+
The New York Times	Favorable
Pitchfork	6.8/10
Rolling Stone	3.5/5 stars
Slant Magazine	3.5/5 stars
Spin	3.5/5 stars

The soundtrack received generally favorable reviews from music critics. At Metacritic, which assigns a normalized rating out of 100 to reviews from mainstream publications, the soundtrack received an average score of 77, based on 16 reviews.

== Track listing ==
All tracks performed by Karen O and the Kids and produced by O and tbiller, except "Lost Fur", performed and composed by Carter Burwell.

No.	Title	Writer(s)	Length
1.	"Igloo"	O	1:49
2.	"All Is Love"	O; Nick Zinner	2:50
3.	"Capsize"	O; Dean Fertita; Bradford Cox; Aaron Hemphill; Tom Biller; Jack Lawrence	2:38
4.	"Worried Shoes"	Daniel Johnston	4:12
5.	"Rumpus"	O; Zinner; Tristan Bechet	2:44
6.	"Rumpus Reprise"	O; Imaad Wasif; Cox	1:53
7.	"Hideaway"	O; Wasif	5:11
8.	"Cliffs"	O; Wasif; Oscar Michel	2:59
9.	"Animal"	O; Wasif; Cox	4:11
10.	"Lost Fur"	Burwell (composer)	1:09
11.	"Heads Up"	O; Fertita; Wasif; Cox; Biller; Lawrence	2:56
12.	"Building All Is Love"	O; Zinner; Bechet	3:33
13.	"Food Is Still Hot"	O	2:45
14.	"Sailing Home"	O	1:03

== Album credits ==
- Karen O – vocals (1–9 11–14), guitar (1, 2), production (1–9, 11–14)
- Dean Fertita – keyboards (2, 12, 14), organ (3–5), marimba (4, 6), piano (11, 12), guitar, (3, 13), backing vocals (11)
- Bradford Cox – guitar (2, 3, 5, 8, 9, 11, 12, 14), backing vocals (2, 11), vocal effects (3, 9), glockenspiel (1), ambient sounds (3), bells (4, 7, 13), vibraphone (5)
- Tom Biller – organ (1, 5–7, 9, 13), guitar (2, 11, 12, 14), percussion (2, 12, 14), bass (5, 12), drums (3), church bells (3), backing vocals (11), banjo (12), mixing (1–9, 11–14), production (1–9, 11–14), recording (1–9, 11–14)
- Jack Lawrence – bass (2–4, 6–8, 11, 13, 14) marimba (4), backing vocals (11)
- Brian Chase – drums (2, 3, 5–7, 9, 11, 12, 14), percussion (8) backing vocals (11)
- Imaad Wasif – guitar (1, 2, 6–9, 11, 12, 14) backing vocals (11) harmonica (13)
- Greg Kurstin – piano (4, 6, 11 )
- Mark Chalecki – mastering (1–9, 11–14)
- Nick Zinner – electric guitar (2), guitar (6, 12, 14)
- Oscar Michel – bowed bass (8)
- Max Records – countdown shouting intro (2)
- Aaron Hemphill – drums (3)
- Tristan Bechet – drum programming (5), guitar (12)
- Carter Burwell – orchestrator (10), conductor (10)
- Mark Stewart, Marc Ribot – guitar (10)
- Barbara Allen, Victoria Drake – harp (10)
- David Weiß – woodwind (10)
- Sharon Yamada, Laura Seaton – violin (10)
- Robert Reinhart – viola (10)
- David Cossin, Gordon Gottlieb – percussion (10)
- Rob Botti – oboe (10)
- Michael Farrow – mixing (10)
- Tony Finno – copyist (10)
- Sandra Park – strings contractor (10)
- Pavel Vinnitsky – clarinet (10)
- Eileen Moon – cello (10)
- Marc Goldberg – bassoon (10)
- Greg Cohen – bass (10)

== Charts ==
Chart performance for Where the Wild Things Are: Motion Picture Soundtrack
Chart (2009)	Peak position
UK Soundtrack Albums (Official Charts)	19
US Billboard 200	35
US Soundtrack Albums (Billboard)	2
US Top Alternative Albums (Billboard)	10
US Top Rock Albums (Billboard)	15
