= All Is Love =

"All is Love"

Single by Karen O and the Kids

from the album Where the Wild Things Are
- Released: August 25, 2009
- Recorded: 2008
- Genre: Indie rock
- Length: 2:48
- Label: DGC/Interscope
- Songwriters: Karen O, Nick Zinner
- Producers: Karen O, Tom Biller

"All Is Love" is a song written by Karen O and Nick Zinner for the 2009 film Where the Wild Things Are. The song was recorded by Karen O and the Kids, a group consisting of O, Zinner, and several other prominent indie rock musicians, and released as the lead single from the film's soundtrack on August 25, 2009. The name "All is Love" is a play on the name of the Swedish band Love is All, whose song "Make Out Fall Out" inspired Karen O. The whimsical song contains shouting, whistling, and clapping and incorporates an untrained children's choir.

"All Is Love" was widely praised by critics and received nominations for the Broadcast Film Critics Association Award for Best Song and the Grammy Award for Best Song Written for a Motion Picture, Television or Other Visual Media, but did not win. Critics considered the song's failure to receive a nomination for the Academy Award for Best Original Song a "snub".

== Background ==
Spike Jonze, director of Where the Wild Things Are, knew he wanted Yeah Yeah Yeahs singer Karen O to compose the film's soundtrack as soon as he began working on its screenplay. Though O had never worked on a soundtrack before, Jonze stated, "I just love her music and knew she could write emotionally in the way we needed the music [...] I wanted a lot of people working on the movie that weren’t necessarily trained in like [...] a bit more I just knew had the right sensibility and worked intuitively because I wanted not be like a real cerebral thing I wanted to be this very childlike, intuitive way of filmmaking."

O signed on in November 2007, two years before the film and soundtrack were released, and assembled a large group of Indie Rock musicians to accompany her on tracks: Dean Fertita, Imaad Wasif, Tom Biller, Jack Lawrence, Bradford Cox, Greg Kurstin, and Yeah Yeah Yeahs bandmates Brian Chase and Nick Zinner. Together, O and Zinner wrote "All Is Love", the soundtrack's lead single. O says she began writing with the hope of paying homage to her favorite movie music through "organic melodies, really simple performances, [and] a lot of emotion" that "both kids and adults would appreciate."

Jonze hoped the film's music would have a similar mood as The Langley Schools Music Project, a collection of recordings by a rural Canadian school choir, and gave O a copy of the album Innocence and Despair to inspire her. O described the songs as "all sort of jangly and imperfect, but the heart behind it kills you." As a result, O incorporated a sixteen-person untrained children's choir into several tracks, most prominently on "All Is Love".

== Composition ==
Karen O and the Kids "All Is Love" (2009)
On "All Is Love", Karen O and the Kids are joined by the shouts and vocals of an untrained children's choir.

"All Is Love" is set in C major at a tempo of 108 beats per minute. The song begins with a slow piano introduction before picking up speed. The lyrics commence with Karen O yelling, "One, two, ready, go!" The children and adults then sing the song's first and only verse. According to Andrzej Lukowski of Drowned in Sound, "with the children to back her up and bulk her out, O can permit herself her frailest, most open tones". In the song's high pitched, sing-along chorus, the artists spell out "L-O-V-E" and chant "all is love, is love, is love, is love". In between repetitions of the chorus are shouts of "Hey!" and "Woo!" by the children and a whistled bridge. The music is supported by clapping and a variety of instruments including guitar, bass, and drums. The song concludes with the kids shouting "is love!" over and over.

== Critical reception ==
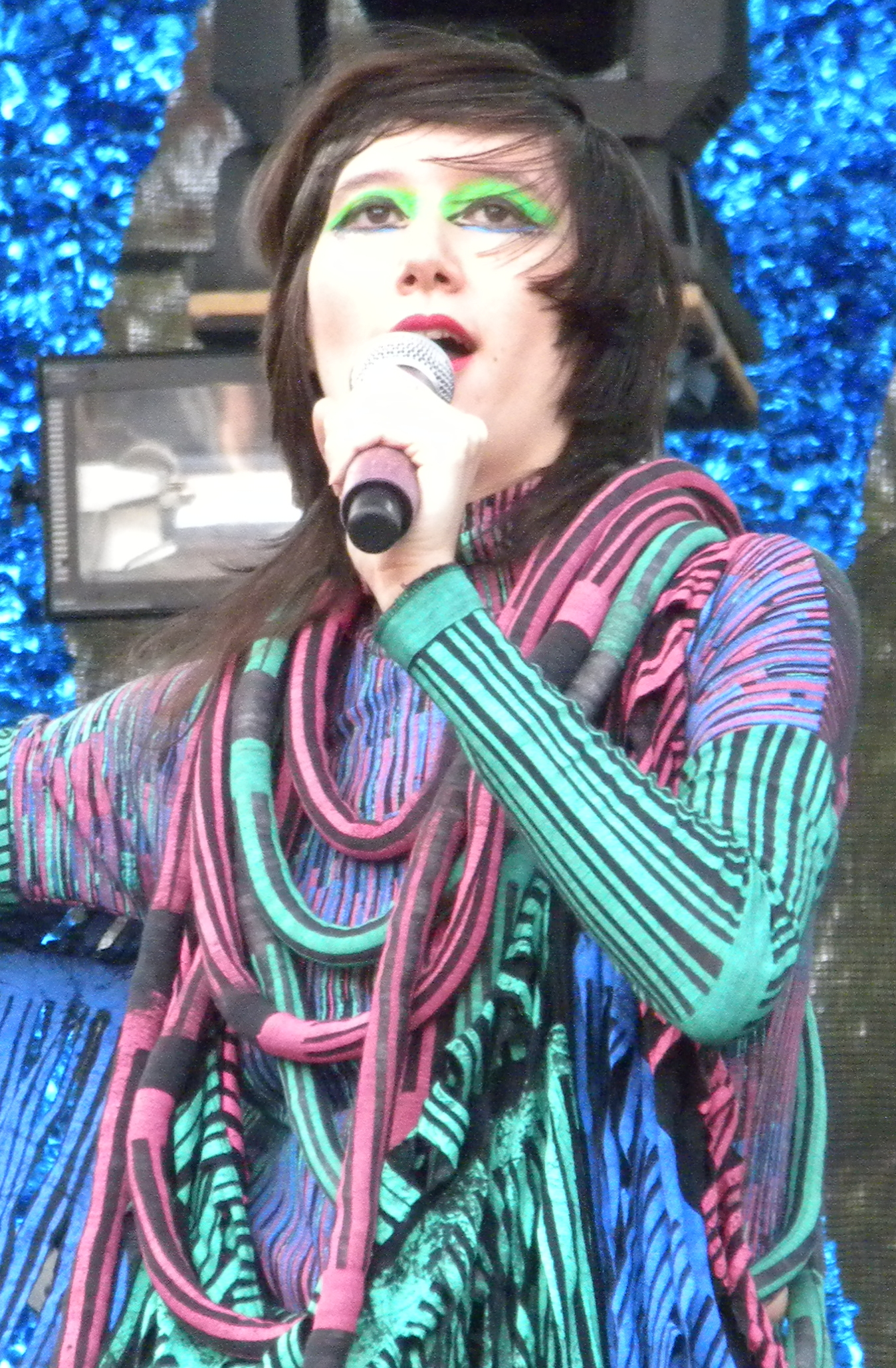
Karen O

Critical reception for "All Is Love" was positive. Heather Phares of Allmusic called it "a rainbow of youthful expression" and marked it as one of the best tracks on the soundtrack. Nate Chinen of The New York Times found the song "a summery pleasure". Andrew Gensler of T: The New York Times Style Magazine described "All Is Love" as an "ebullient leadoff" and an "infectious singalong anthem". Mikael Wood of the Los Angeles Times wrote that "Karen O proves she's capable of still more, floating her ethereal vocals over charmingly ramshackle folk-pop arrangements" and that her "unique singing defines [...] "All Is Love". Warren Truit of About.com calls "All Is Love" a "highlight" of the soundtrack, "absolutely joyful", and "a magical anthem". Hermione Hoby of The Guardian claims the song is "as sweetly joyous as Arcade Fire as reimagined by Sesame Street and has a chorus that will thaw icy hearts. Justin Jacobs of Paste magazine describes "All Is Love" as a "seriously sunshiney tune" and remarks, "If you had any sort of imagination as a child, the time to start getting excited is now." Ronald Hart of The Hollywood Reporter claims that on "All Is Love", Karen O and the Kids "perfectly capture childlike innocence" and that the track's "whimsical melody that's lighter and brighter" than the songs produced by the musician's regular bands. Hart concludes, "If you close your eyes, you can easily envision the Wild Things prancing along to this joyful singalong".

=== Awards and nominations ===
On December 9, 2009, Jones posted an email from Interscope records announcing "All Is Love" had replaced "The Climb" as a nominee for the Grammy Award for Best Song Written for a Motion Picture, Television or Other Visual Media, a songwriter's award. Although "The Climb", written by Jessi Alexander and Jon Mabe, had been featured in the film Hannah Montana: The Movie, it had not been written intentionally for the film as the category's eligibility rules required. The National Academy of Recording Arts and Sciences (NARAS), the presenters of the Grammy Awards, released a statement stating that despite the "great lengths" NARAS takes to review nominations, "there are rare occasions where changes are required". NARAS stated that Walt Disney Records had voluntarily reported the error and withdrawn the nomination, and that "The Academy ha[d] complied with the label’s request. Per our process in this circumstance, The Academy has pulled up the next eligible song in this category, which is "All Is Love". The song lost the award to "Jai Ho" from Slumdog Millionaire.

"All is Love" also received a nomination for the Broadcast Film Critics Association Award for Best Song at the 15th Critics' Choice Awards, but lost to "The Weary Kind" from Crazy Heart. The song was included on the short list for the Academy Award for Best Original Song at the 82nd Academy Awards. Its failure to receive a nomination for the award was widely considered a "snub".
