= KO at Home =

KO at Home is a demo CD by Karen O (of Yeah Yeah Yeahs) that was leaked onto the Internet in mid-December 2006.

== History ==
Karen O recorded 14 songs in her own home several years before they were unearthed in late 2006. The demo (46 minutes and 22 seconds) mostly consists of acoustic songs, with several different tracks on each song, all played by Karen. She burned these songs onto a CD-R, created a handwritten cover (including a photo of her with Janet Weiss of Sleater-Kinney and an Oscar Wilde quote) and gave it as a gift to TV on the Radio's guitarist and music producer, Dave Sitek.

After several years, Dave moved out of his apartment, leaving behind several items including two briefcases. One of these briefcases contained the KO at Home demo CD. An anonymous man (known only as "Mike") found the CD and decided to keep it and give it to a friend as a gift. Before he gave it away, he converted the CD to MP3s on his computer. Soon after, he decided to post them on the Internet, citing that he found the tracks to be "interesting" and that he "thought other fans might appreciate them.".

== Controversy ==
The legality of the release soon came into question, and both Dave Sitek and Karen O became angry that their privacy had been violated, as the CD was never meant to be released to the public. Within a few days, both Dave and Karen made relative peace with the situation, although still regretful that it happened at all. Yeah Yeah Yeahs' record label, Interscope Records, has confirmed that Karen O is the creator and performer on the KO at Home demo, but has thus far refused to comment any further.
