= Pepita Emmerichs =

Australian musician and actress

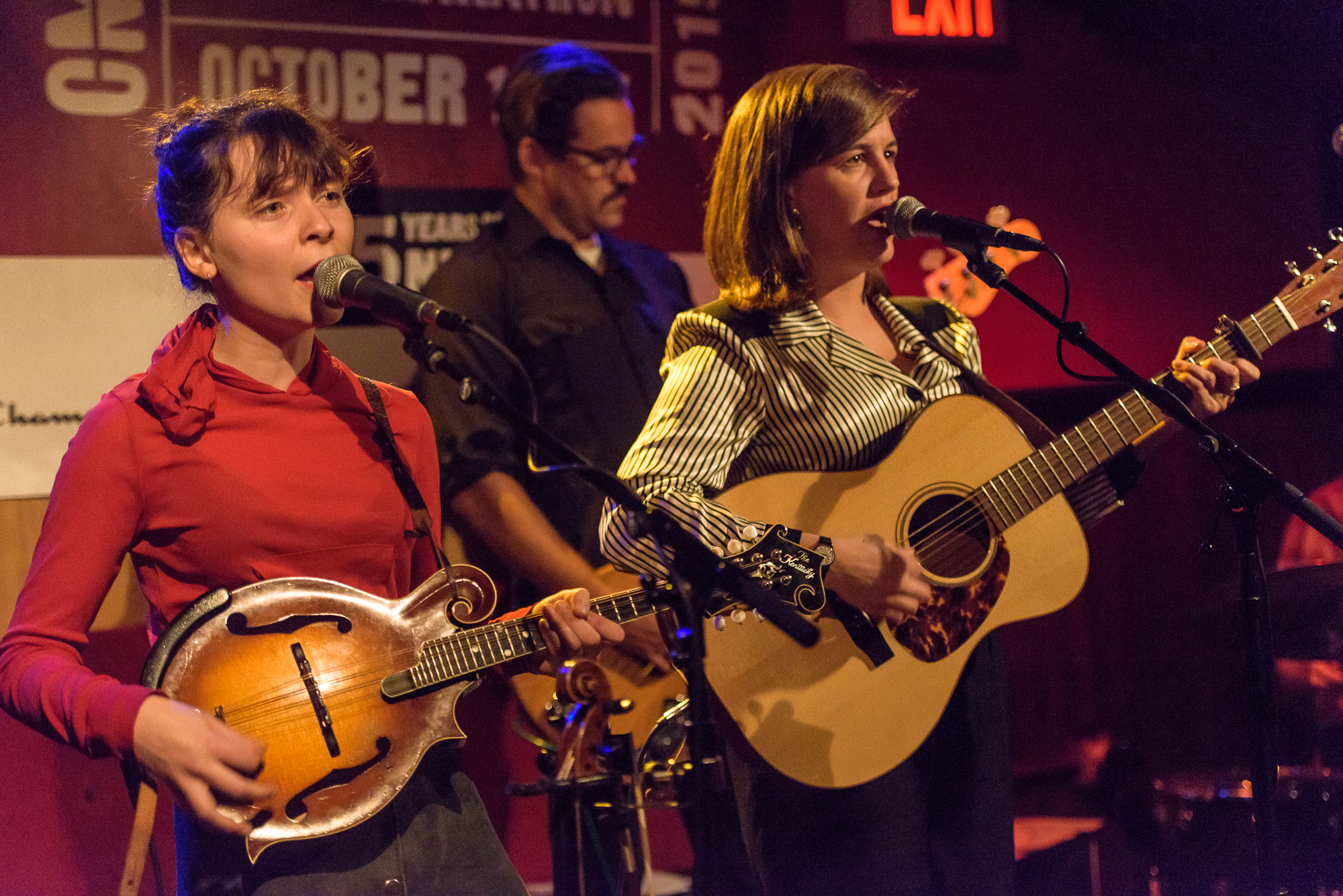
- Pepita Emmerichs (left) performs with Olivia Hally as Oh Pep! at the 2015 CMJ Music Marathon in New York

Background information
- Born: Melbourne, Victoria, Australia.
- Genres: folk, pop, country, bluegrass
- Occupations: Musician, actress
- Instruments: violin, mandolin
- Years active: 2005–present
- Member of: Oh Pep!

Pepita Emmerichs is an Australian musician and actress. She co-founded the music group Oh Pep! with Olivia Hally, and appeared in the 2009 film Where the Wild Things Are.

== Life and career ==
Pepita "Pepi" Emmerichs was born and raised in Melbourne, Australia. She attended the Victorian College of Arts Secondary School, where she began collaborating with fellow student Olivia Hally in 2009. Emmerichs and Hally later co-founded the band Oh Pep!, whose musical style Emmerichs has characterised as "folk/pop/country with bluegrass instrumentation".

Emmerichs also appeared in Spike Jonze's 2009 film Where the Wild Things Are, in which she played Claire, the protagonist's older sister.

== Filmography ==
Year	Title	Role	Notes
2005	Blue Heelers	Ally Shaw	Episode: Everything a girl could want
2009	Where the Wild Things Are	Claire	Film
2010	Stony Point	Amelia	Short film
