= Barnaby Clay =

British film and music video director

- Born: 15 May 1973 (age 53)
- Other name: Barney Clay
- Education: London International Film School
- Occupation: Film director
- Years active: 1996–present
- Spouse: Karen O (m. 2011)
- Children: 1

Barnaby Clay (born 15 May 1973) is a British film and music video director.

== Career ==
Clay graduated from London International Film School in 1996, directing the school's entry to the Fuji Film Scholarship Awards – the short film Justice in Mind, took home the top award of Best Film. Soon after leaving film school he moved into directing music videos and commercials. He has directed music videos for bands including Jon Spencer Blues Explosion, TV on the Radio, Gnarls Barkley, the Yeah Yeah Yeahs, and Dave Gahan.

In 2003 Clay traveled to Russia with the gypsy punk band Menlo Park to make his first documentary for Britain's Channel 4 entitled Greetings From Beartown. In 2005 he wrote and directed a short film for Ritz Fine Jewellery titled Carousel, starring Chloë Sevigny.

In 2007 his fantasy horror short, Finkle's Odyssey, won the Méliès d'Argent at Fantsporto Film Festival, also collecting awards at Brooklyn International Film Festival, Marvais Genre, IFCT, 24 FPS Film Festival.

In 2011, Clay re-worked Mick Rock's music video for David Bowie's "Life On Mars". The installation was a part of Vice Media and Intel's Creators Project series, traveling globally under the name 'Life On Mars Revisited'.

Clay has collaborated with his wife, Karen O, including directing a music video for her first solo record, Crush Songs.

Clay directed the Vice Films full-length feature documentary entitled Shot! The Psycho-Spiritual Mantra of Rock (2017).

In 2023, Clay directed the feature film The Seeding, which premiered at the Tribeca Film Festival in June 2023.

== Personal life ==
In 2007, Clay moved to New York City, where he met Karen O, lead singer of the band Yeah Yeah Yeahs. The two were married in December 2011. Their son was born in August 2015.
