= The Moon Song =

Single by Karen O and various artists
- Released: February 11, 2014
- Label: WaterTower
- Songwriters: Karen Lee Orzolek; Spike Jonze
- Producers: Karen O; Spike Jonze

Karen O and various artists singles chronology
"Immigrant Song" (2011)	"The Moon Song" (2014)	"Rapt" (2014)

"The Moon Song" is a song by American singer and songwriter Karen O from the 2013 film Her. It was released as a single by WaterTower on February 11, 2014. Written and produced by Karen O and filmmaker Spike Jonze, three versions of the song were recorded: a solo rendition, a duet by actors Scarlett Johansson and Joaquin Phoenix—used in Her—and a duet by Karen O and rock musician Ezra Koenig.

"The Moon Song" earned positive reviews for the vocal performances and "dreamy" composition. It was nominated for the Academy Award for Best Original Song and the Grammy Award for Best Song Written for Visual Media. Commercially, it appeared on five charts across three countries.

== Background and recording ==
Singer and songwriter Karen O, frontwoman of Yeah Yeah Yeahs, first worked with filmmaker Spike Jonze in 2004 with the music video for "Y Control", leading to numerous collaborations between the two. This included co-writing and performing on the soundtrack for Where the Wild Things Are in 2009. According to the pair, "The Moon Song" was 10 years in the making.

"The Moon Song" was first recorded and produced in Karen O's home as a solo rendition. Actors Scarlett Johansson and Joaquin Phoenix, who star in Her, next recorded a duet specifically for use in the film. Finally, Karen O recorded a studio version with musician Ezra Koenig, frontman of Vampire Weekend, who she said "slipped into character like a champ and damn he's got the goods." Of the three recordings, Karen O thought her studio duet with Koenig fulfilled "a wish of my die-hard romantic junior high self".

== Music and lyrics ==
According to sheet music published by BMG Rights Management, "The Moon Song" is composed in the key of C major with a tempo of 96 beats per minute. The song is characterized by acoustic guitars, no percussion, and minimal production. Its lyrics, co-written by Karen O and Jonze, are about an expression of love between Her characters Theodore and Samantha. She explains:

Spike wanted an intimate love song that conveyed what it feels like when you are falling in love, the lyric 'a million miles away' is meant to signify the feeling of being the only two people in the universe a million miles away from your life as you know it. 'A million miles away' also signifies the inherent unrequited nature of Theodore and Samantha's relationship.

== Release and reception ==
On August 10, 2013, Karen O's first recording of "The Moon Song" was used in a promotional trailer for Her. On August 29, the song was released on SoundCloud in a limited capacity, allowing 10,000 downloads before its removal from the platform. On February 11, 2014, all three renditions were released for streaming only by WaterTower Music. Karen O and Koenig notably performed the song at the 86th Academy Awards, which took place on March 2, 2014.

"The Moon Song" was positively received by critics, with Melissa G. Muller of Rolling Stone calling it "dreamy" and Paul MacInnes of The Guardian praising Karen O's vocal abilities. It was nominated for the Academy Award for Best Original Song, the Grammy Award for Best Song Written for Visual Media, and the World Soundtrack Award for Best Original Song Written Directly for a Film. In the United States, the song appeared on the Alternative Digital Song Sales Chart at number 15 and the Hot Rock & Alternative Songs Chart at number 27. Internationally, it reached number 13 on the UK Independent Singles Breakers Chart, number 34 on the Mexico Ingles Airplay chart, and number 194 in France.

== Track listing ==
All tracks are written by Karen O and Spike Jonze.

Digital download
No.	Title	Performers	Length
1.	"The Moon Song" (Studio Version Duet)	Karen O; Ezra Koenig	3:05
2.	"The Moon Song" (End Title Credit)	Karen O	2:26
3.	"The Moon Song" (Film Version)	Scarlett Johansson; Joaquin Phoenix	1:50

== Charts ==
Chart performance for "The Moon Song"
Chart (2014)	Peak position
France (SNEP)	194
Mexico Ingles Airplay (Billboard)	34
UK Independent Singles Breakers (OCC)	13
US Alternative Digital Song Sales (Billboard)	15
US Hot Rock & Alternative Songs (Billboard)	27
