= Hologram World =

2008 single by Tiny Masters of Today

Single by Tiny Masters of Today
- Released: February 25, 2008
- Genre: Rock / indie / punk rock
- Length: 4:39
- Label: Mute Records

"Hologram World" is a song by the Tiny Masters of Today. The single features the song "Hologram World", the XFM version of "Hologram World" and the music video for "Radio Riot" directed by Nick Chatfield-Taylor. It was released in the United Kingdom on February 25, 2008. Alternate versions of the single feature the XFM version of "Hey, Mr. DJ".

== Music video ==
Under the moniker Kids with Canes, Karen O and her boyfriend Barney Clay directed the music video for the song "Hologram World" which was released on February 8, 2008. Karen also served as choreographer and appears in the video along with Yeah Yeah Yeahs bandmates Nick Zinner and Brian Chase as well as Mike D from the Beastie Boys, Gibby Haynes from the Butthole Surfers, Russell Simins from the Blues Explosion and Sam James from The Mooney Suzuki.

== Track listing ==
1. "Hologram World"
2. "Hologram World" (XFM Version)
3. "Radio Riot" (video)

== Personnel ==
- Ivan: vocals, guitar
- Ada: vocals, bass guitar, keyboards and percussion
- Russell Simins: drums
- Karen O: vocals
- Nick Zinner: guitar
