= Where the Wild Things Are (film) =

2009 film

- Theatrical release poster
- Directed by: Spike Jonze
- Screenplay by: Spike Jonze; Dave Eggers
- Based on: Where the Wild Things Are by Maurice Sendak
- Produced by: Jeph Loeb; Gary Goetzman; Tom Hanks; Maurice Sendak; John B. Carls; Vincent Landay
- Starring: Max Records; Catherine Keener; Mark Ruffalo; Lauren Ambrose; Chris Cooper; James Gandolfini; Catherine O'Hara; Forest Whitaker
- Cinematography: Lance Acord
- Edited by: Eric Zumbrunnen; James Haygood
- Music by: Karen O; Carter Burwell
- Production companies: Warner Bros. Pictures; Legendary Pictures; Village Roadshow Pictures; Playtone
- Distributed by: Warner Bros. Pictures (Worldwide); Roadshow Films (Australia & New Zealand)
- Release dates: 13 October 2009 (New York City); 16 October 2009 (United States); 3 December 2009 (Australia); 17 December 2009 (Germany)
- Running time: 100 minutes
- Countries: Australia; United States; Germany
- Language: English
- Budget: $100 million
- Box office: $100.1 million

Where the Wild Things Are is a 2009 fantasy adventure drama film directed by Spike Jonze, who co-wrote the screenplay with Dave Eggers. Based on Maurice Sendak's 1963 children's book, it combines live-action, performers in costumes, animatronics, and computer-generated imagery (CGI). The film stars Max Records, Catherine Keener, and Mark Ruffalo, and the voices of Lauren Ambrose, Chris Cooper, James Gandolfini, Catherine O'Hara, and Forest Whitaker. The film centres on a young boy named Max who sails away to an island inhabited by creatures known as the "Wild Things", who declare him king.

In the early 1980s, The Walt Disney Company considered adapting the book with a blend of traditionally animated characters and computer-generated environments, but development did not go past a test film to see how the animation hybridisation would result. In 1999, Universal Studios acquired rights to the book's adaptation and initially attempted to develop a computer-animated adaptation with Disney animator Eric Goldberg, but the CGI concept was replaced with a live-action one in 2003, Goldberg was dropped for Jonze, and work on the film was transferred to Warner Bros. Pictures. The film was produced by Jeph Loeb, Gary Goetzman, Sendak, John B. Carls, and Vincent Landay, and made with an estimated budget of $100 million. Where the Wild Things Are was a joint production between Australia, Germany, and the United States, and was filmed principally in Melbourne.

Where the Wild Things Are was released on 16 October 2009 in the United States, on 3 December in Australia, and on 17 December in Germany. The film was a financial flop, grossing $100.1 million against its equal production budget, but received positive reviews from critics, though significant concerns were raised over whether or not it was suitable for young audiences.

== Plot ==
Max is an emotional eight-year-old boy with an active imagination and divorced parents. After his older sister Claire refuses to intervene when her friends crush his snow fort during a snowball fight, Max furiously trashes her bedroom and destroys a frame that he made for her. Later, his mother Connie invites her boyfriend, Adrian, to dinner. Furious that she is not spending time with him, Max puts on a wolf costume and lashes out by biting her shoulder before running away from home. At the edge of a river, Max finds a small boat that he boards.

Eventually, Max reaches an island inhabited by seven large monsters called Wild Things named Carol, Ira, Judith, Alexander, Douglas, KW, and the Bull. Carol is destroying the huts due to KW's departure, and Max attempts to join in, only to find himself facing the suspicious anger of the Wild Things. When they attempt to eat him, Max convinces them that he is a king with magical powers capable of bringing harmony to the group. Impressed, the Wild Things crown him as their new king, and after KW returns, Max declares a "wild rumpus" in which he and the Wild Things wreak havoc in the forest, before going to sleep in a pile.

The next day, Carol takes Max on a tour of the island and shows him a model of the island that he built depicting what he wishes it looked like. Inspired by this, Max orders the construction of an enormous fort. When KW brings her owl friends Bob and Terry to the fort, a disagreement ensues as Carol believes that they are outsiders. To release their frustrations, Max divides the Wild Things into two teams for a dirt-clod fight. However, Alexander is accidentally injured during the game, and Carol chastises KW for jokingly stepping on him, causing her to leave again.

Max later finds Alexander alone in the fort, whereupon he reveals that although he knows that Max is not a powerful king, he warns him to keep it a secret from Carol. However, at night, Douglas reveals the truth when Carol has a meltdown over the state of the fort and Max's failure to fulfill his duties as a king, causing Carol to furiously chase Max into the forest, only for KW to save the latter. After Carol leaves, Max realizes what his mother is going through and decides to leave the island.

Max returns to the destroyed remains of Carol's model island and makes a frame for him. He then apologizes to Carol and tells him of his intent of going home, but Carol responds with sadness. The other Wild Things escort Max to his boat. Upon finding Max's frame, Carol arrives just in time to see Max sailing away and howls, and Max howls in return, along with the other Wild Things. Upon returning home, Max reconciles with his mother, who gives him dinner.

== Cast ==
- Max Records as Max, a misunderstood boy with a wild imagination.
- Catherine Keener as Connie, Max's mother.
- Mark Ruffalo as Adrian, Connie's boyfriend.
- Pepita Emmerichs as Claire, Max's older sister.
- Steve Mouzakis as Max's teacher.
- Max Pfeifer, Madeleine Greaves, Joshua Jay, and Ryan Corr as Claire's companions.
- James Gandolfini as the voice of Carol, the impulsive and short-tempered but caring leader of the Wild Things.
  - Vincent Crowley as the suit performer of Carol.
- Lauren Ambrose as the voice of KW, an ape-like Wild Thing who becomes a mother figure to Max.
  - Alice Parkinson as the suit performer of KW.
- Chris Cooper as the voice of Douglas, a cockatoo-like peace-keeping Wild Thing who is Carol's friend.
  - John Leary as the suit performer of Douglas.
- Forest Whitaker as the voice of Ira, a gentle and soft-spoken Wild Thing.
  - Sam Longley as the suit performer of Ira.
- Catherine O'Hara as the voice of Judith, a three-horned lion-like Wild Thing who is Ira's aggressive and loud girlfriend.
  - Nick Farnell as the suit performer of Judith.
- Paul Dano as the voice of Alexander, a goat-like Wild Thing who is constantly ignored, belittled, and mistreated.
  - Sonny Gerasimowicz as the suit performer of Alexander.
- Michael Berry Jr. as the voice of the Bull, a quiet bull-like Wild Thing who keeps to himself and rarely talks.
  - Angus Sampson as the suit performer of the Bull.
- Spike Jonze as the voice of Bob and Terry, a pair of owls who are KW's friends.

== Production ==
=== Development ===
Where the Wild Things Are started its development in the early 1980s, originally to be an animated feature by Walt Disney Productions that would have blended traditionally animated characters with computer-generated settings. Animators Glen Keane and John Lasseter (who later moved on to Pixar Animation Studios) had completed a test film to see how the animation hybridizing would work out, but the project proceeded no further.

Sendak and producer John B. Carls later formed Wild Things Productions in 1992, with the intent to produce adaptations of Sendak's properties. Universal Pictures and Playtone acquired rights to the book's adaptation in 1999, initially attempting to develop a live-action/CGI adaptation with Gore Verbinski attached to direct and Eric Warren Singer attached to write the screenplay. In 2001, Universal replaced the live-action/CGI concept with a fully computer-animated adaptation, with Disney animator Eric Goldberg attached to direct. However, in 2003, they reverted to live-action, and Goldberg was replaced with Spike Jonze, who had previously collaborated with Sendak on an unproduced adaptation of Harold and the Purple Crayon, which eventually was released in 2024.

After years of interest from various producers, Sendak favoured Spike Jonze as director, noting he was "young, interesting and had a spark that none of the others had". The film was originally set for release from Universal; however, disagreements between Universal and Sendak over Jonze's approach to the story led to a turnaround arrangement where the film's production was transferred to Warner Bros. Pictures.

Spike Jonze: Check. Dave Eggers: Check. Yeah Yeah Yeahs: Check. Where the Wild Things Are has all the ingredients to become the hipster equivalent of Star Wars.

— NPR, All Things Considered

In 2005, Jonze and Dave Eggers completed a 111-page screenplay, expanding the original thirteen-sentence story. During the process of writing the script, Jonze and Eggers would break in the afternoon so Spike could take an afternoon nap (just one example of the nontraditional approach they took to the writing process). On 8 July 2006, production began open auditions for the role of Max. The process took months, but, eventually, Max Records was cast. Academy Award-winning make-up effects supervisor Howard Berger (The Chronicles of Narnia) turned down offers to work on the film four times. Although the book inspired him as a child to work in special effects, he felt filming it was a "horrible idea." Jonze then approached Steve Johnson who had done initial designs and test suits, but ultimately Jim Henson's Creature Shop provided the animatronic suits for the Wild Things.

Jonze kept in close consultation with Sendak throughout the process, and the author approved creature designs created by Jim Henson's Creature Shop. To make the set a more comfortable environment for Max Records, Jonze encouraged the crew members to bring their children to the set. Some of them can be seen in the film's classroom scene.

Michelle Williams was originally cast as the female Wild Thing KW only to leave the project after her voice "didn't match the original vision of how the Wild Thing should sound". She was replaced by Lauren Ambrose, and filming continued.

=== Filming and special effects ===
Principal photography began in July 2006 at Docklands Studios Melbourne in Melbourne, Australia and wrapped in December 2006.

In 2008, test footage was leaked onto the internet, garnering mixed reactions. Jonze called the footage "a very early test... to see if our SFX plan for the faces would work," but early fan outcry over the video, along with rumored "scared children" in test audiences, led Warner Bros. to delay the film's release for a year from its original 3 October 2008 release date. On 20 February 2008, speculation emerged that Warner Bros. was considering reshooting the entire film.

Then-WB president Alan F. Horn responded, "We've given him more money and, even more importantly, more time for him to work on the film. We'd like to find a common ground that represents Spike's vision but still offers a film that really delivers for a broad-based audience. No one wants to turn this into a bland, sanitized studio movie. This is a very special piece of material, and we're just trying to get it right." Producer Gary Goetzman followed, "We support Spike's vision. We're helping him make the vision he wants to make."

At the end of 2008, Jonze teamed up with Framestore in London to complete his film and work with them to bring to life the performances through their animation and special effects team. Over the course of the next six months, Jonze spent time with the animators on the floor of the studio as they worked together to realize his intention for the performances that had started many years before with the voices, continued with the suit performances in Australia, and were completed in London's Soho. He also reshot several scenes and added three new ones, bringing the film's cost up from the original greenlit $75 million to $100 million.

=== Music ===
For the film's trailer, Arcade Fire provided a re-recorded version of the track "Wake Up" from their album Funeral. The new version is not featured in the actual film or the soundtrack and has never been made available to the public.

During the film, various songs can be heard such as "Hideaway", "Rumpus", "Worried Shoes" and "All Is Love" by Karen O, Zahida K, Anisa R K, and the Kids.

== Reception ==
Jonze unleashes his considerable creativity. The beasts are recognizable from Sendak's pages, but Jonze gives them names and distinct personalities that connect to aspects of Max's psyche and to the people he loves. Freud would adore this movie. They are vast, feathered, horned, clawed, beaked and definitely wild — irrational and dangerous, even when showing affection — and Jonze uses their threatening bulk as well as their capacity for cruelty to remind us that Max's taming of them is only temporary. For any child, it is near impossible to stay king of anything, even in fantasy.

— Mary Pols, Time magazine

=== Box office ===
The studio decided not to position the film as a children's movie and spent 70% of the advertising on broad-based and adult-driven promotion. The film was released in North America in both conventional and IMAX cinemas on 16 October 2009. Early Friday box office estimates show the film earned about $32.7 million on its opening weekend in theaters. It grossed $77.2 million during its theatrical run in the U.S. and Canada, plus $22.8 million internationally. Overall, the studio took a loss as the final budget of the movie was estimated to be around $100 million.

Internationally, the film was released in Australia on 4 December 2009; in Ireland and the UK on 11 December 2009; and in Germany on 17 December 2009. It was released in Russia on 4 February 2010.

=== Critical response ===
On review website Rotten Tomatoes, the film holds an approval rating of 73% based on 267 reviews, with an average rating of 7.3/10. The site's critical consensus reads: "Some may find its dark tone and slender narrative off-putting, but Spike Jonze's heartfelt adaptation of the classic children's book is as beautiful as it is uncompromising." Metacritic assigned the film a weighted average score of 71 out of 100 based on 37 critics, indicating "generally favorable reviews". Audiences surveyed by CinemaScore gave the film an average grade of "B+" on scale of A+ to F.

Lisa Schwarzbaum of Entertainment Weekly gave the film an A, declaring the film "one of the year's best." Manohla Dargis of the New York Times wrote that Spike Jonze's "filmmaking exceeds anything he's done" before, while also noting the imaginative visuals and otherworldly feel, along with the fantastic creature effects on the "Wild Things". Peter Travers of Rolling Stone gave the film four stars saying, "For all the money spent, the film's success is best measured by its simplicity and the purity of its innovation." Roger Ebert awarded the film three stars out of four, saying, "All the same, the film will play better for older audiences remembering a much-loved book from childhood, and not as well with kids who have been trained on slam-bam action animation." Dan Jolin of Empire gave the film a four out of five stars, saying, "A film for anyone who's ever climbed trees, grassed knees or basked in the comfort of a parents sympathy as they've pulled you off the ground crying. It'll make your inner child run wild".

Some critics have noted the movie's dark adaptation for children, such as David Denby from The New Yorker saying, "I have a vision of eight-year-olds leaving the movie in bewilderment. Why are the creatures so unhappy?" Stephanie Zacharek of Salon.com criticized the film's visual aspect, "Even the look of the picture becomes tiresome after a while — it starts to seem depressive and shaggy and tired." She also stated that "The movie is so loaded with adult ideas about childhood — as opposed to things that might delight or engage an actual child." The Globe and Mail's Liam Lacey branded the production a "self-consciously sad film."

Critic A.O. Scott named the film the best of 2009 and placed it at number five on his list of top 10 movies of the decade.

=== Concerns over suitability for children ===
Warner Bros. initially feared that the film was not family-friendly and would frighten children, but these fears were not shared by Jonze or Sendak. Jonze refused to compromise, and Maurice Sendak said after having seen a completed cut of the film, "I've never seen a movie that looked or felt like this. And it's [Spike Jonze's] personal 'this.' And he's not afraid of himself. He's a real artist who lets it come through in the work. So he's touched me. He's touched me very much." After seeing the finished product, a Warner Bros. executive stated of Jonze, "He's a perfectionist and just kept working on it, but now we know that at the end of the day he nailed it."

Film classification agencies have tended to assign "parental guidance" ratings rather than general or family ratings. MPAA in the United States assessed a PG rating "for mild thematic elements, some adventure action, and brief language". A PG rating was also declared in the United Kingdom by BBFC, citing "mild threat and brief violence". In Canada, the film also received a PG rating in Ontario with an alert for frightening scenes while Quebec awarded a General rating. British Columbia also assessed the film with a G rating with a proviso that it "may frighten young children". In Ireland the film has been classified PG because of what is claimed as having "mild" violence. Similarly in South Africa, the film received a PG rating with a consumer content Violence indicator, noting there were "moments of mildish menace and poignant themes." Australia also applied a PG rating to the film and noted "mild violence and scary scenes".

The movie's release generated conflicting views over whether it is harmful to expose children to frightening scenes. Jonze indicated that his goal was "to make a movie about childhood" rather than to create a children's movie. Dan Fellman, Warner Brothers' head of movie distribution, noted that the film's promotion was not directed towards children, advising parents to exercise their own discretion. In an interview with Newsweek, Sendak stated that parents who deemed the film's content to be too disturbing for children should "go to hell. That's a question I will not tolerate" and he further noted "I saw the most horrendous movies that were unfit for child's eyes. So what? I managed to survive."

=== Home media ===
The film was released as a Blu-ray/DVD/Digital copy combo pack and on DVD on 2 March 2010. The home media release was accompanied by a Canadian-produced live-action/animated short film adaptation of another Sendak work, Higglety Pigglety Pop! or There Must Be More to Life, produced especially for the Blu-ray edition.

== Merchandise ==
=== Video game ===
A video game based on the film was released on 13 October 2009, for the PlayStation 3, Xbox 360, Wii, and Nintendo DS. The former three were developed by Griptonite Games, and the latter by WayForward. All were published by Warner Bros. Games.

=== Skateboards and limited edition shoes ===
To coincide with the film's release, Girl Skateboards (which Jonze co-owns) came out with seven pro-model skateboards with the Wild Things as the board graphics. Lakai shoes also re-designed most of their pro-model and stock shoes and added in different colors, adding in pictures of the Wild Things on the side and on others with Where the Wild Things Are printed on the side. UGG Australia also designed limited-edition Where the Wild Things Are boots.

=== Toys ===
A series of collectible vinyl dolls of the Wild Things and Max was released by the Japanese company MediCom Toys. Other releases include an eight-inch articulated figure of Max in wolf costume and smaller-scale sets of the characters released under their Kubrick figure banner.

=== Novelisation ===
McSweeney's published The Wild Things by Dave Eggers, a full-length novel based on the film adaptation.
