= Karen O =

American singer and songwriter (born 1978)

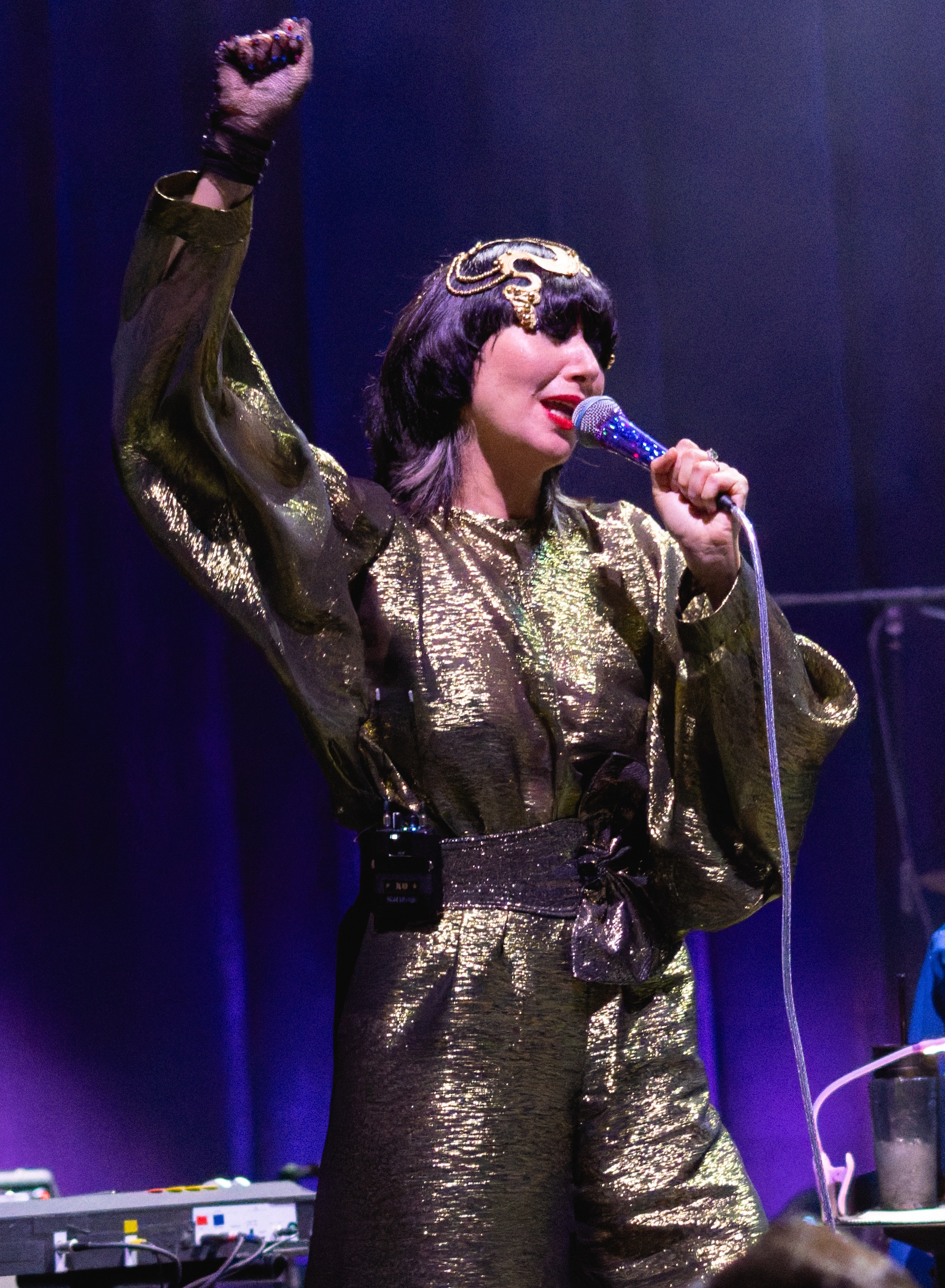
- Karen O performing with Yeah Yeah Yeahs in 2025
- Born: Karen Lee Orzolek; November 22, 1978 (age 47); Seoul, South Korea
- Occupations: Singer; songwriter
- Years active: 2000–present
- Works: Discography
- Spouse: Barnaby Clay (m. 2011)
- Children: 1
- Musical career
- Origin: Englewood, New Jersey, U.S.
- Genres: Garage rock; post-punk; indie rock; art punk; dance-punk
- Instruments: Vocals; keyboards; guitar
- Member of: Yeah Yeah Yeahs
- Website: karenomusic.com

Karen Lee Orzolek (born November 22, 1978), known professionally as Karen O, is an American singer and songwriter. Known for her dynamic performances and distinctive vocals, she was a key figure in the 2000s garage rock and post-punk revivals, and in the New York music scene. She is also regarded as a style icon.

Karen O is the lead vocalist of the band Yeah Yeah Yeahs, who have released five albums and hit singles like "Maps", "Gold Lion", and "Heads Will Roll". Outside of work with the group, she has contributed to several film and television soundtracks, notably co-writing and performing the soundtrack of Where the Wild Things Are and "The Moon Song" for Her. She released her debut solo album Crush Songs in 2014, and collaborated with Danger Mouse for the album Lux Prima in 2019.

Karen O's accolades include nominations for eight Grammy Awards, an Academy Award, two Critics' Choice Awards, and a Golden Globe Award. Rolling Stone named her one of the "200 Greatest Singers of All Time" in 2023.

== Early life ==
Orzolek was born on November 22, 1978, in Seoul, South Korea, the daughter of a Korean mother and a Polish-American father. She was raised in Englewood, New Jersey and attended Dwight-Englewood School, where she says a friend sparked her love of music and took her to a Jonathan Fire*Eater concert. She briefly went to Oberlin College in Ohio but did not enjoy it, moving to New York thereafter to attend the NYU Tisch School of the Arts.

== Career ==
=== Yeah Yeah Yeahs ===
Karen O is the lead vocalist and principal lyricist of the indie rock band Yeah Yeah Yeahs, formed in early 2000 with guitarist Nick Zinner; drummer Brian Chase was added in September 2000 to form a trio. Regarding their approach to music, Karen O told the Los Angeles Times that, "We still have to grab people by the collar [...] We put out a record every three years now; we could easily be forgotten. If you look at a lot of our peers that we came up with, a lot of them have disappeared."

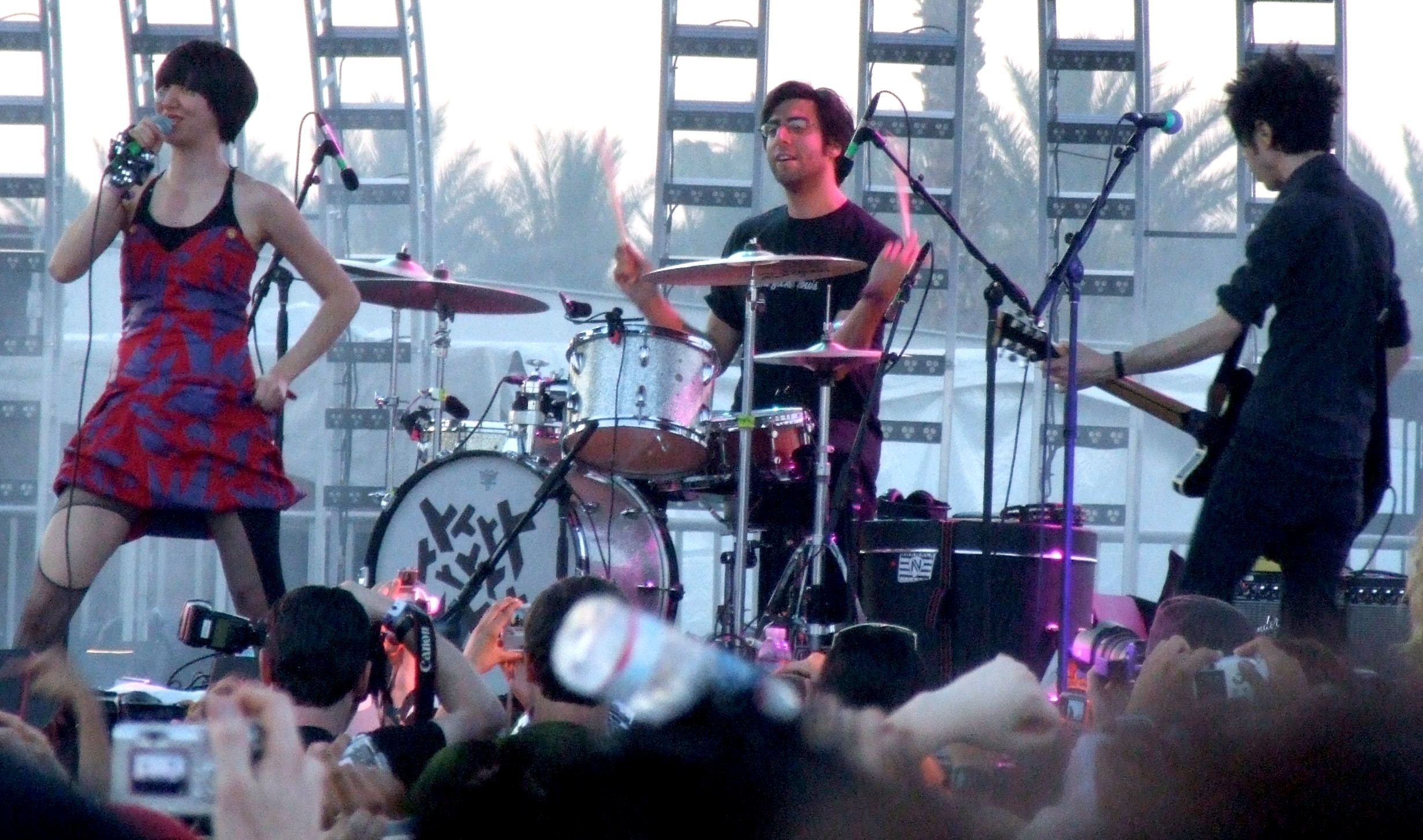
Yeah Yeah Yeahs performing at Coachella in 2006

Yeah Yeah Yeahs achieved success with the release of their debut studio album, Fever to Tell, signing with Interscope Records for distribution only in 2003. It sold over one million copies worldwide by the end of the decade, netting them international fame. They have since released four more albums to general acclaim and commercial success, becoming known for their musical reinventions and Karen O's energetic performances. Every album has entered the US Billboard 200, with Mosquito (2013) reaching the top five, Show Your Bones (2006) the top 20, and It's Blitz! (2009) the top 30. All of their albums have also entered the UK Albums Chart, each making the top ten except Fever to Tell.

Yeah Yeah Yeahs have received four nominations for the Grammy Award for Best Alternative Music Album for Fever to Tell, Show Your Bones, It's Blitz!, and Cool It Down; the first was also nominated for the Shortlist Music Prize. Their singles "Maps", "Heads Will Roll", and "Sacrilege" have collectively received seven nominations at the MTV Video Music Awards, and "Spitting Off the Edge of the World" was nominated for the Grammy Award for Best Alternative Music Performance.

=== Solo career ===
Under the moniker Marshmellow, Karen O directed "We Fenced Other Gardens with the Bones of Our Own" by Liars in 2004, "Blessed Evening" by Foetus in 2005, and "Cheated Hearts" by Yeah Yeah Yeahs in 2006. The lattermost, composed of clips submitted by fans who look alike to the band, was described by Karen O as "the most amazing way to connect with our fans."

On December 10, 2006, a home-recorded album titled KO at Home was leaked via an invite-only BitTorrent tracking site. The album, originally a personal gift to Dave Sitek of TV on the Radio, was discovered inside a suitcase that Sitek had left behind in a New York City apartment. The disc's 14 tracks and scan of the cover (a photograph of Karen O with a poem written by Oscar Wilde on the back side of the photo) quickly spread. News sites broke the story of the leak when Sitek lashed out at the fan who leaked the demos. Eventually, Sitek followed up his comments with an apology letter. In response to the leak, Karen O said that "shit happens", and although she was "a little grossed out", she offered commentary on which of the songs she liked the most.

Karen O was featured in the track "Cut Me Up" by Har Mar Superstar for the soundtrack to the 2005 horror film House of Wax. For the film Jackass Number Two, Karen O collaborated with electronic artist Peaches and Johnny Knoxville to record a track entitled "Backass"; for Jackass 3D, she covered Roger Alan Wade's "If You're Gonna Be Dumb" under the alternative title of "If You're Gonna Be Dumb, You Gotta Be Tough". In 2007, she also contributed vocals to a version of Bob Dylan's "Highway 61 Revisited" for the I'm Not There film soundtrack. She performed a short song at the end of the Tim and Eric Awesome Show, Great Job! episode "Brothers Cinco". She also performed the track "Strange Love" on the album Frankenweenie Unleashed! (Music Inspired by the Motion Picture).

In July 2008, Karen O debuted a side project called Native Korean Rock with fellow New York City musicians, beginning with two intimate performances at Union Pool in Brooklyn. Under the moniker Kids with Canes, she and her husband Barnaby Clay directed the music video for "Hologram World" by Tiny Masters of Today in 2008, in which she also starred, contributed vocals, and choreographed. In 2009, she contributed backing vocals and screaming animal sounds to three songs on Embryonic, the twelfth album by the Flaming Lips.

Karen O co-wrote and performed on the soundtrack of Spike Jonze's 2009 film Where the Wild Things Are, working with Carter Burwell and credited as "Karen O and the Kids". The song, "All Is Love", co-written with Nick Zinner, was nominated for Best Song Written for Visual Media at the 2010 Grammy Awards. She collaborated with Trent Reznor and Atticus Ross on a cover version of Led Zeppelin's "Immigrant Song" for the soundtrack of the 2011 film The Girl with the Dragon Tattoo. Also in 2011, she featured on "Pinky's Dream" from David Lynch's debut solo album Crazy Clown Time.

In 2012, Karen O collaborated with experimental rock group Swans on the song "Song for a Warrior" on their album The Seer. She also lends vocals to the song "GO!" on Santigold's 2012 album Master of My Make-Believe. On the collaboration project with N.A.S.A. on The Spirit of Apollo, she appears on the track "Strange Enough", together with Ol' Dirty Bastard and Fatlip. She has also collaborated with James Iha on his second solo LP, Look to the Sky (2012).

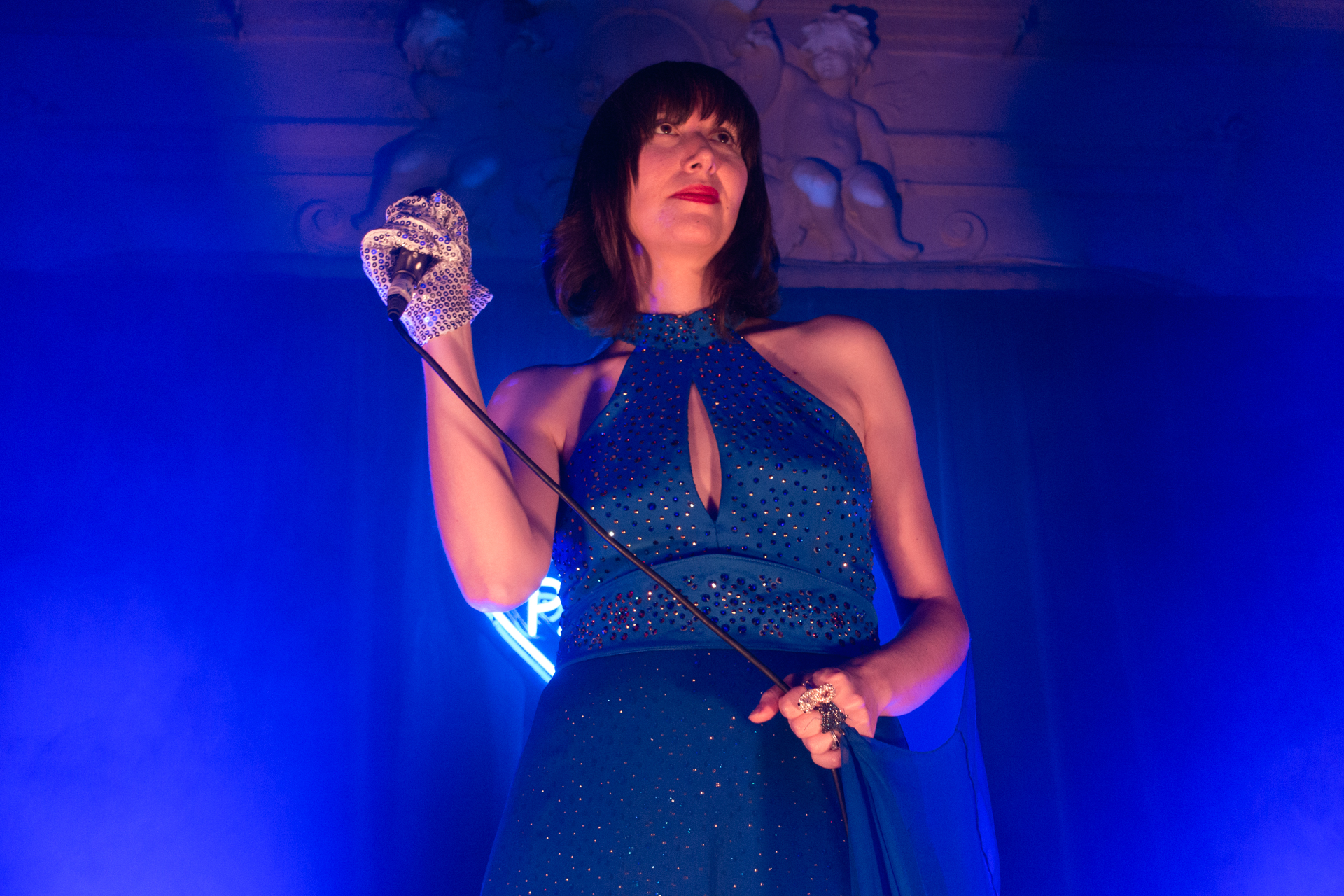
Karen O performing in support of Crush Songs in 2014

Karen O contributed "The Moon Song" to Jonze's 2013 film Her, which was nominated for the Academy Award for Best Original Song and her second Grammy for Best Song Written for Visual Media. Her debut solo album, Crush Songs, was released on September 9, 2014 by Cult Records. This was accompanied by a live album, Live from Crush Palace, recorded during three shows at Hollywood Forever Cemetery's Masonic Lodge in September 2014. Released in 2015, it features live renditions of songs from Crush Songs, as well as select works from her film soundtracks.

In 2014, Karen O's cover of "A Marshmallow World" was featured in Target's holiday commercials. On May 5, 2015, her song in tribute to Nellie Bly was used as part of a Google doodle commemorating Bly's 151st birthday. Also in 2015, her cover of Animotion's "Obsession" was used as the opening theme for the Starz miniseries Flesh and Bone. Microsoft approached Karen O in 2016 to pen a theme song for Square Enix's game Rise of the Tomb Raider, which resulted in the song "I Shall Rise". On January 11, 2018, she released the song "Yo! My Saint", featuring guest vocals from Michael Kiwanuka, in support of Kenzo's Spring Summer 2018 collection.

On March 15, 2019, Karen O and musician-producer Danger Mouse released the collaborative album Lux Prima. The two originally met to discuss collaboration in 2007 as mutual admirers, but did not collaborate until 2016 due to scheduling and availability, resulting in the album Lux Prima three years later. To promote the album, an immersive art piece and communal listening experience titled "An Encounter with Lux Prima" was released. Jonze shot the video for the song "Woman" live in one take, as the duo performed on The Late Show with Stephen Colbert.

== Legacy ==
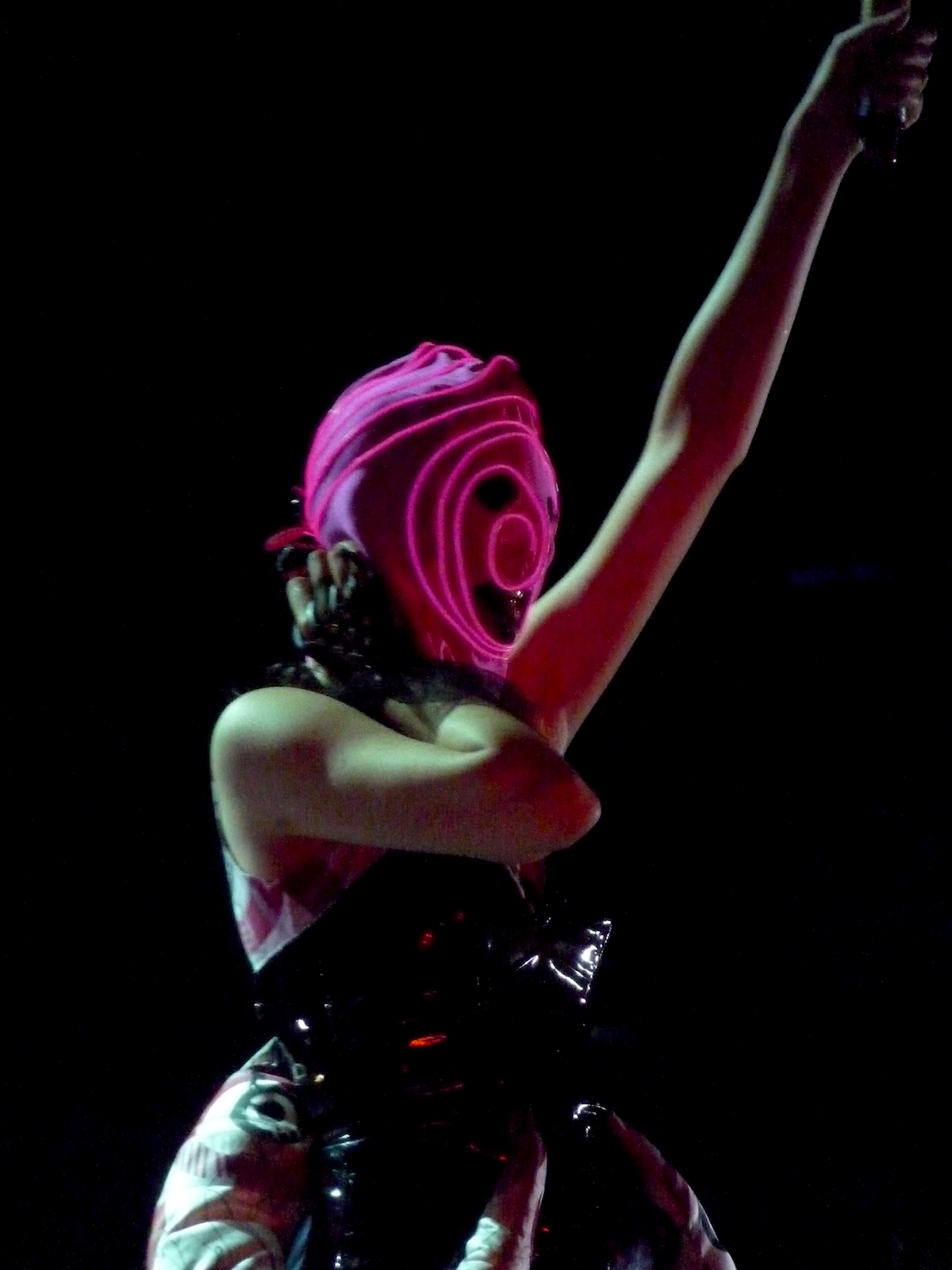
Karen O is noted for wearing eccentric outfits designed by Christian Joy

Karen O was a key figure of the 2000s garage rock and post-punk revivals, standing at the forefront of the New York music scene. Her energetic live performances, which include once dousing herself in olive oil and spitting drinks on herself or the audience, became her trademark. Her distinctive vocals have been described in select reviews as "ethereal" and an "eclectic snarl that softens and trembles". She is also regarded as a sex symbol—a label she rejects—and fashion icon, which she credits to her partnership with costume designer Christian Joy, wearing her works exclusively at concerts and live events. She explained in an interview:

Well, I really don't see myself that way, I just don't feel like what I'm doing onstage is sexy. Provocative, maybe, but sexy? I guess I don't really know what sexy is to a lot of people. I mean, I do know that I don't find tits and ass that sexy… But then I don't find many pop stars sexy… The only pop star I find sexy is Michael Jackson.

In the middle of the rock revival, Rolling Stone deemed Karen O "one of rock's most intense singers, coming on so badass you'd swear the devil sold his soul to her." Her role in the movement is examined in the book Meet Me in the Bathroom and its 2022 film adaptation, both of which document Yeah Yeah Yeahs's history and Karen O's struggles with sexualization and sensationalism.

Karen O was included on NME's Cool List thrice in 2002 (4th), 2003 (10th), and 2006 (5th). She was titled Spin's "Sex Goddess" twice in 2004 and 2005, and Blender's "Rock's Hottest Woman" in 2006. In 2023, Rolling Stone placed her on its list of the "200 Greatest Singers of All Time" at number 184. In 2026, Classical Music placed her on their ranking of the 25 greatest frontwomen in rock at number 17.

== Personal life ==
Karen O has dated Liars lead singer Angus Andrew and filmmaker Spike Jonze. In December 2011, she married director Barnaby Clay. Their son was born in August 2015.

== Discography ==
Solo discography

- Crush Songs (2014)
- Lux Prima (with Danger Mouse) (2019)

With Yeah Yeah Yeahs

- Fever to Tell (2003)
- Show Your Bones (2006)
- It's Blitz! (2009)
- Mosquito (2013)
- Cool It Down (2022)

== Awards and nominations ==
With the Yeah Yeah Yeahs, Karen O has received nominations for five Grammy Awards, seven MTV Video Music Awards, and the Shortlist Music Prize. In her solo career, she has been nominated for three additional Grammys, an Academy Award, two Critics' Choice Awards, and a Golden Globe Award.

Award	Year (Note: Indicates the year of ceremony. Each year is linked to the article about the awards held that year, wherever possible.)	Category	Work	Result	Ref.
Academy Awards	2013	Best Original Song	"The Moon Song"	Nominated	
Chicago Film Critics Association Awards	2009	Best Original Score	Where the Wild Things Are	Nominated	
Critics' Choice Awards	2010	Best Score	Where the Wild Things Are	Nominated	
Critics' Choice Awards	2010	Best Song	"All Is Love"	Nominated	
GAFFA Awards	2006	Best Foreign Female Act	Herself	Nominated	
Golden Globe Awards	2010	Best Original Score	Where the Wild Things Are	Nominated	
Grammy Awards	2010	Best Song Written for Visual Media	"All Is Love"	Nominated	
Grammy Awards	2015	Best Song Written for Visual Media	"The Moon Song"	Nominated	
Grammy Awards	2020	Best Rock Performance	"Woman"	Nominated	
Satellite Awards	2009	Best Original Score	Where the Wild Things Are	Nominated	
Shockwave NME Awards	2010	Hottest Woman	Herself	Won	
Virgin Media Music Awards	2006	Most Fanciable Female	Herself	Nominated	
World Soundtrack Awards	2009	Best Original Soundtrack of the Year	Where the Wild Things Are	Nominated	
World Soundtrack Awards	2014	Best Original Song Written Directly for a Film	"The Moon Song"	Nominated	
Žebřík Music Awards	2009	Female Singer of the Year	Herself	Nominated	
