= Yeah Yeah Yeahs discography =

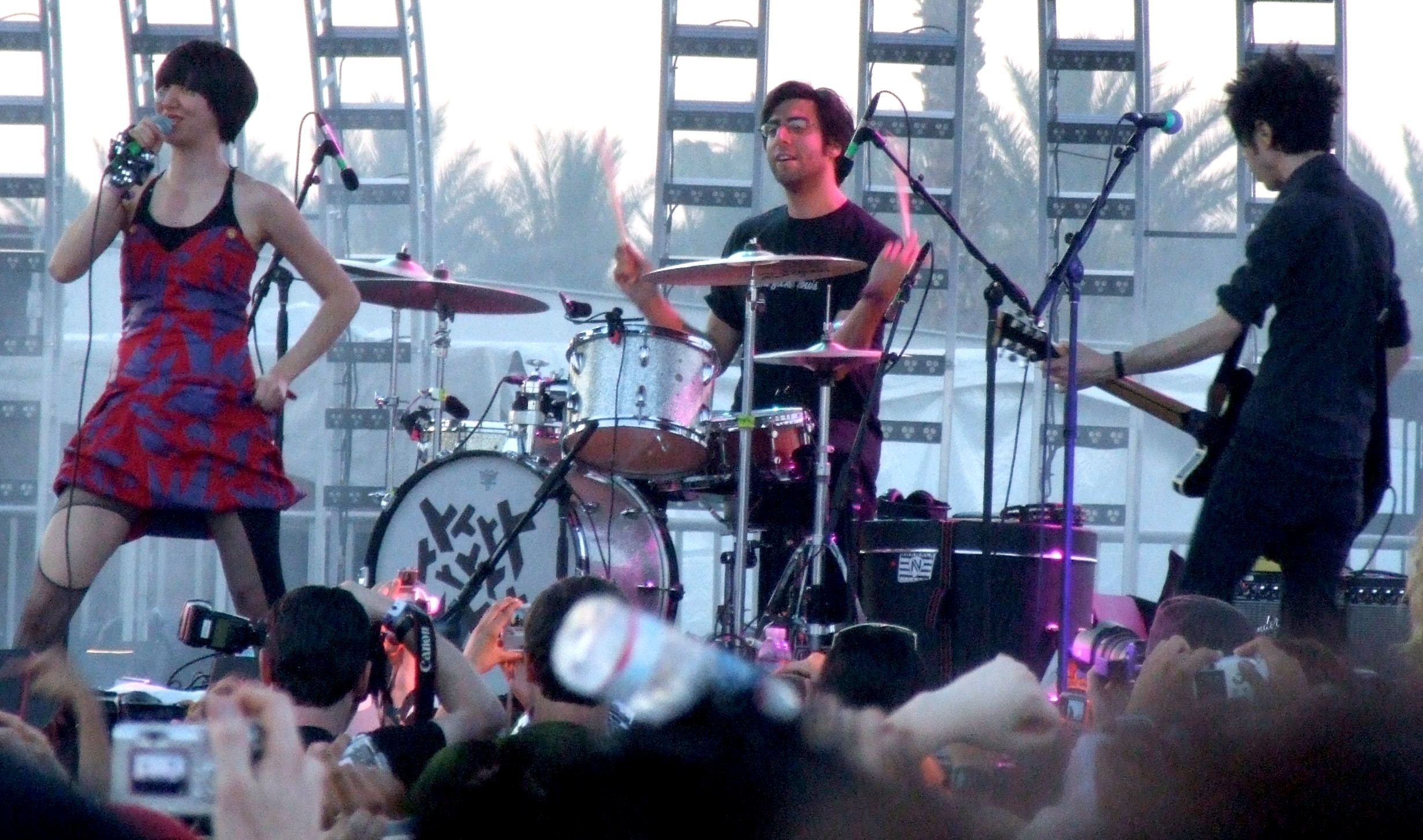
- Yeah Yeah Yeahs performing at Coachella in 2006. From left to right: Karen O, Brian Chase and Nick Zinner.
- Studio albums: 5
- Extended plays: 4
- Live albums: 1
- Compilation albums: 1
- Singles: 18
- Video albums: 2
- Music videos: 18

American indie rock band Yeah Yeah Yeahs have released five studio albums, one live album, one compilation album, four extended plays, 18 singles, two video albums, and 18 music videos. The band formed in New York City in 2000, and consists of lead singer Karen O, drummer Brian Chase, and guitarist Nick Zinner.

The band released their self-titled debut EP in July 2001. It was followed by another EP a year later, titled Machine, which spawned an identically titled single that peaked at number 37 on the UK Singles Chart. The band's debut studio album, Fever to Tell, was released in April 2003, reaching number 55 on the US Billboard 200 chart and number 13 on the UK Albums Chart. Fever to Tell spawned four singles, including "Maps", which also charted in the US and UK. The band then released their first video album, Tell Me What Rockers to Swallow, which features footage from a live performance and all of the band's music videos through 2004.

Yeah Yeah Yeahs second album, Show Your Bones, was released in March 2006, followed a year later by another EP, Is Is. They released their third studio album, It's Blitz!, in April 2009. It's Blitz! spawned the single "Heads Will Roll", which appeared on several international charts. The band's fourth album, Mosquito, was released in April 2013 and became their highest-peaking album in the US to date, reaching number five on the Billboard 200. After Mosquito, the band took a brief hiatus. Nine years later, Yeah Yeah Yeahs released their fifth album, Cool It Down, in September 2022.

== Albums ==
=== Studio albums ===
List of studio albums, with selected chart positions and certifications
Title	Details	Peak chart positions										Sales	Certifications
Title	Details	US	AUS	AUT	BEL (FL)	CAN	FRA	GER	IRE	SCO	UK	Sales	Certifications
Fever to Tell	Released: April 29, 2003; Label: Interscope; Formats: CD, LP, digital download	55	80	—	—	—	70	—	18	12	13	WW: 1,000,000; US: 640,000; UK: 205,000	RIAA: Gold; BPI: Gold
Show Your Bones	Released: March 22, 2006; Label: Dress Up, Interscope; Formats: CD, LP, digital download	11	17	54	43	9	96	65	17	6	7	US: 269,000	BPI: Gold
It's Blitz!	Released: March 6, 2009; Label: Dress Up, DGC, Interscope; Formats: CD, LP, digital download	22	8	61	23	18	160	71	10	11	9	US: 278,000	RIAA: Gold; ARIA: Gold; BPI: Gold
Mosquito	Released: April 12, 2013; Label: Dress Up, Interscope; Formats: CD, LP, digital download	5	17	44	57	10	128	63	8	8	9		
Cool It Down	Released: September 30, 2022; Label: Secretly Canadian; Formats: CD, LP, digital download	45	19	—	123	—	— (Note: Cool It Down did not enter the French Album Top 200, but peaked at number 83 on the French Top Album Physiques chart.)	29	80	6	10		
"—" denotes a recording that did not chart or was not released in that territory.

=== Compilation albums ===
Title	Details
iTunes Originals – Yeah Yeah Yeahs	Released: October 20, 2009; Label: DGC, Interscope; Format: Digital download

=== Live albums ===
Title	Details
Hidden in Pieces: Live at the Royal Albert Hall	Released: September 1, 2026; Label: Secretly Canadian; Formats: CD, LP, digital download

=== Video albums ===
List of video albums, with chart positions
Title	Details	Peaks	
Title	Details	US	UK
Tell Me What Rockers to Swallow	Released: October 19, 2004; Label: Interscope; Format: DVD	27	16
Yeah Yeah Yeahs: Live from London	Released: July 27, 2010; Label: DGC, Interscope; Format: iTunes video	—	—
"—" denotes a recording that did not chart or was not released in that territory.

== Extended plays ==
List of extended plays, with selected chart positions
Title	Details	Peak chart positions						
Title	Details	US	AUS	CAN	DEN	ITA	MEX	SWE
Yeah Yeah Yeahs	Released: July 9, 2001; Label: Shifty, Touch and Go; Formats: CD, 12-inch vinyl, digital download	—	— (Note: Yeah Yeah Yeahs did not enter the Australian ARIA Albums Chart but peaked at number nine on the ARIA Hitseekers Chart.)	—	7	—	—	56
Machine	Released: November 5, 2002; Label: Touch and Go; Formats: CD, 10-inch vinyl, digital download	—	—	—	—	—	—	—
Live Session EP (iTunes Exclusive)	Released: August 22, 2006; Label: Interscope; Format: Digital download	—	—	—	—	—	—	—
Is Is	Released: July 24, 2007; Label: Dress Up, Interscope; Formats: CD, 7-inch vinyl, digital download	72	38	44	5	33	63	—
"—" denotes a recording that did not chart or was not released in that territory.

== Singles ==
List of singles, with selected chart positions, showing year released and album name
Title	Year	Peak chart positions										Certifications	Album
Title	Year	US	AUS	BEL (FL)	BEL (WA)	CAN	FRA	GER	IRE	SCO	UK	Certifications	Album
"Machine"	2002	— (Note: "Machine" did not enter the Billboard Hot 100, but peaked at number 13 on the Hot Singles Sales chart.)	—	—	—	—	—	—	—	37	37		Machine
"Date with the Night"	2003	—	—	—	—	—	—	—	—	19	16		Fever to Tell
"Pin"	2003	—	—	—	—	—	—	—	—	34	29		Fever to Tell
"Maps"	2004	87	—	—	—	—	—	—	—	35	26	BPI: Silver; RMNZ: Gold	Fever to Tell
"Y Control"	2004	—	—	—	—	—	—	—	—	59	54		Fever to Tell
"Gold Lion"	2006	88	—	—	—	2	—	—	37	13	18		Show Your Bones
"Turn Into"	2006	—	—	—	—	—	—	—	37	29	53		Show Your Bones
"Cheated Hearts"	2006	—	—	—	—	—	—	—	—	—	—		Show Your Bones
"Down Boy"	2007	—	—	—	—	—	—	—	—	—	—		Is Is
"Zero"	2009	— (Note: "Zero" did not enter the Billboard Hot 100, but peaked at number seven on the Hot Singles Sales chart.)	88	—	—	—	—	—	—	6	49		It's Blitz!
"Heads Will Roll"	2009	— (Note: "Heads Will Roll" did not enter the Billboard Hot 100, but peaked at number five on the Hot Singles Sales chart.)	—	1	7	—	45	73	70	75	89	BPI: 2× Platinum; BVMI: 3× Gold; BRMA: Gold; RMNZ: 2x Platinium	It's Blitz!
"Skeletons"	2010	— (Note: "Skeletons" did not enter the Billboard Hot 100, but peaked at number 15 on the Hot Singles Sales chart.)	—	—	—	—	—	—	—	—	— (Note: "Skeletons" did not enter the UK Singles Chart, but peaked at number 24 on the UK Physical Singles Chart.)		It's Blitz!
"Sacrilege"	2013	—	—	— (Note: "Sacrilege" did not enter the Ultratop 50, but peaked at number 74 on the Flemish Ultratip chart.)	—	—	—	—	—	—	137		Mosquito
"Mosquito"	2013	—	—	—	—	—	—	—	—	—	—		Mosquito
"Despair"	2013	—	—	—	—	—	—	—	—	—	—		Mosquito
"Spitting Off the Edge of the World" (featuring Perfume Genius)	2022	— (Note: "Spitting Off the Edge of the World" did not enter the Billboard Hot 100, but peaked at number 15 on the Digital Song Sales chart, number two on the Alternative Digital Song Sales chart, and topped the Rock Digital Song Sales and the Top TV Songs charts.)	— (Note: "Spitting Off the Edge of the World" did not enter the ARIA Singles Chart, but peaked at number 21 on the Australia Digital Tracks Chart.)	—	—	—	—	—	—	—	— (Note: "Spitting Off the Edge of the World" did not enter the UK singles chart, but peaked at number 15 on the UK Singles Sales Chart.)		Cool It Down
"Burning"	2022	— (Note: "Burning" did not enter the Billboard Hot 100, but peaked at number 16 on the Alternative Airplay chart.)	—	—	—	—	—	—	—	—	—		Cool It Down
"Wolf"	2023	—	—	—	—	—	—	—	—	—	—		Cool It Down
"—" denotes a recording that did not chart or was not released in that territory.

== Other charting songs ==
List of charted songs, with selected chart positions, showing year released and album name
Title	Year	Peak chart positions		Album
Title	Year	MEX Ing.	POL	Album
"Sheena Is a Punk Rocker"	2009	—	39	War Child Presents Heroes
"Runaway"	2009	11	—	It's Blitz!
"—" denotes a recording that did not chart or was not released in that territory.

== Music videos ==
List of music videos, showing year released and directors
Title	Year	Director(s)
"Date with the Night"	2003	Patrick Daughters
"Pin"	2003	Tunde Adebimpe
"Maps"	2003	Patrick Daughters
"Y Control"	2004	Spike Jonze
"Gold Lion"	2006	Patrick Daughters
"Turn Into"	2006	Patrick Daughters
"Cheated Hearts"	2006	Marshmellow
"Down Boy"	2007	K. K. Barrett and Lance Bangs
"Zero"	2009	Barney Clay
"Heads Will Roll"	2009	Richard Ayoade
"Skeletons"	2010	Barney Clay
"Sacrilege"	2013	Megaforce
"Mosquito"	2013	B. Shimbe Shim
"Despair"	2013	Patrick Daughters
"Spitting Off the Edge of the World" (featuring Perfume Genius)	2022	Cody Critcheloe
"Burning"	2022	Cody Critcheloe
"Wolf"	2022	Allie Avital
"Blacktop"	2023	David Black

== See also ==
- List of songs recorded by Yeah Yeah Yeahs
