= List of songs recorded by Yeah Yeah Yeahs =

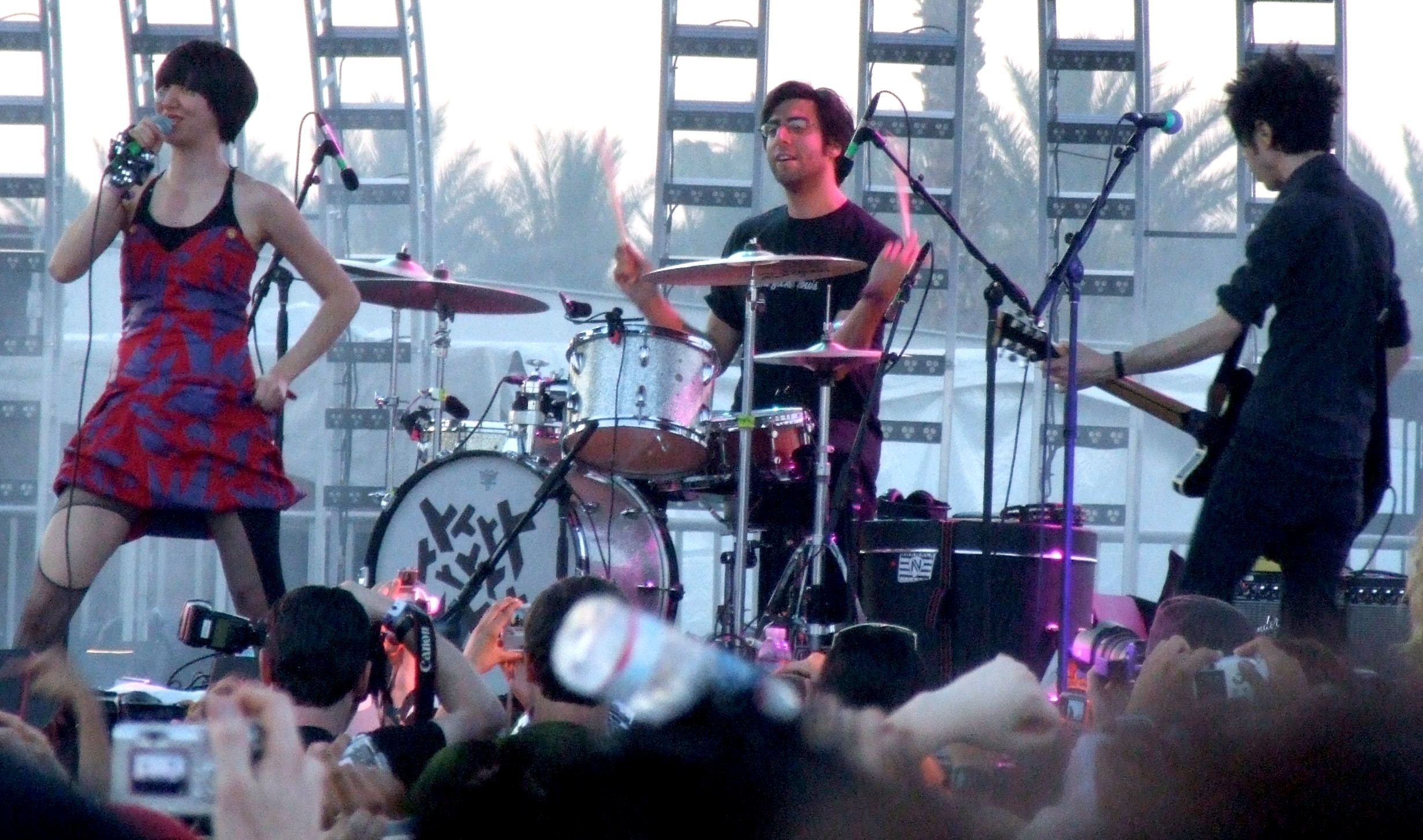
Yeah Yeah Yeahs performing at Coachella in 2006. From left to right: Karen O, Brian Chase and Nick Zinner.

Yeah Yeah Yeahs are an American indie rock band from New York City who have recorded over 90 songs during their career, which includes material for their own studio albums and extended plays (EPs), charity projects, and film soundtracks. The band was formed in 2001 by vocalist Karen O, guitarist and keyboardist Nick Zinner, and drummer Brian Chase. They released their self-titled debut EP (2001), an art punk and garage rock record, to favorable reviews and attention from record labels. In 2002, they signed with Touch and Go and Interscope and began recording new material, resulting in the promotional EP Machine (2002).

Yeah Yeah Yeahs' debut album, Fever to Tell (2003), built on the sound from their previous releases and propelled the band to international stardom; it produced their signature song "Maps", which is a love song meant to endure "the test of time." Their newfound success established them as key figures of the 2000s garage rock and post-punk revivals, standing at the forefront of the New York music scene. They conceived their second album, Show Your Bones (2006), with the goal of avoiding a sophomore slump and shifting to what critics called a "melodic, alt-rock" sound. Karen O explained that the band did not want to be known for one specific sound, and aimed to musically reinvent themselves with each record they released. Show Your Bones drew further success and produced the hit single "Gold Lion", after which they released their second EP, Is Is (2007), which they said "IS IS made for summer nights." Their next album, It's Blitz! (2009), departed from their rock influences to dance-punk music and produced the hit single "Heads Will Roll", which is about an ill-fated night on the dancefloor.

After the It's Blitz! tour, Yeah Yeah Yeahs began to work on new material intermittently as its members began pursuing personal projects. Their fourth album, Mosquito (2013), was produced during a turbulent time for the band, who decided they would only record whenever they felt inspired; the resulting sound was described by Karen O as "extremely lo-fi." They then took a hiatus from 2014 to 2017, returning with a reissue of Fever to Tell that featured previously unreleased demos. After a period of sporadic activity, they signed with Secretly Canadian in 2022 and announced new music and shows. Their fifth and latest album, Cool It Down (2022), features an alternative and electronic rock sound; it produced the single "Spitting Off the Edge of the World" (featuring Perfume Genius), which was inspired by the climate crisis and the COVID-19 pandemic. Recordings from the Hidden in Pieces Tour were compiled into their first live album, Hidden in Pieces: Live at the Royal Albert Hall (2026).

== Songs ==
Key
†	Indicates song released as a single
#	Indicates song not written by Yeah Yeah Yeahs
—N/a	Indicates song not from an album or EP

Rock musician David Andrew Sitek (pictured in 2009) has produced nearly all of the band's recordings since 2003, beginning with Fever to Tell (2003).

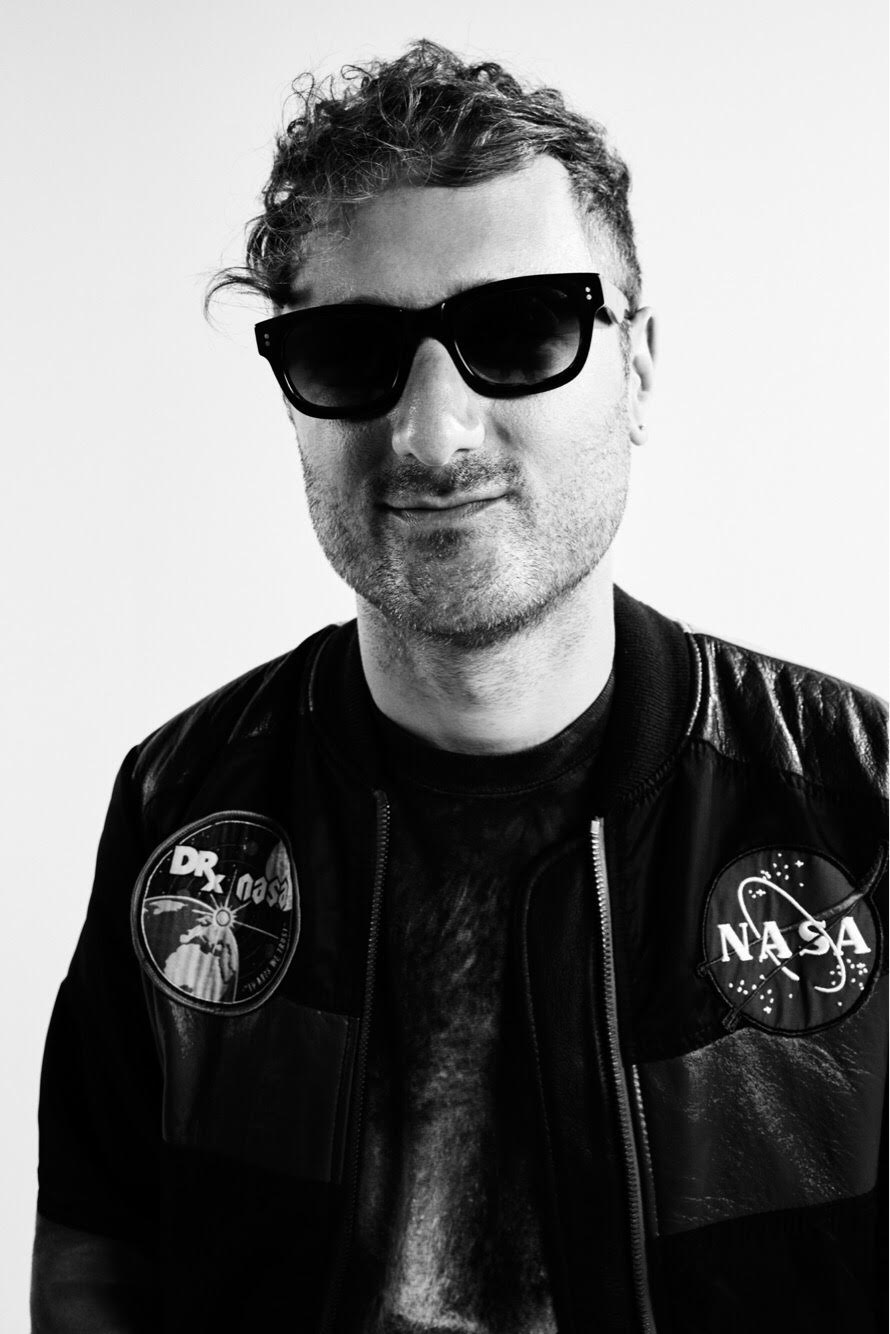
DJ Sam Spiegel (pictured in 2019) co-produced the band's second and fourth albums, Show Your Bones (2006) and Mosquito (2013).

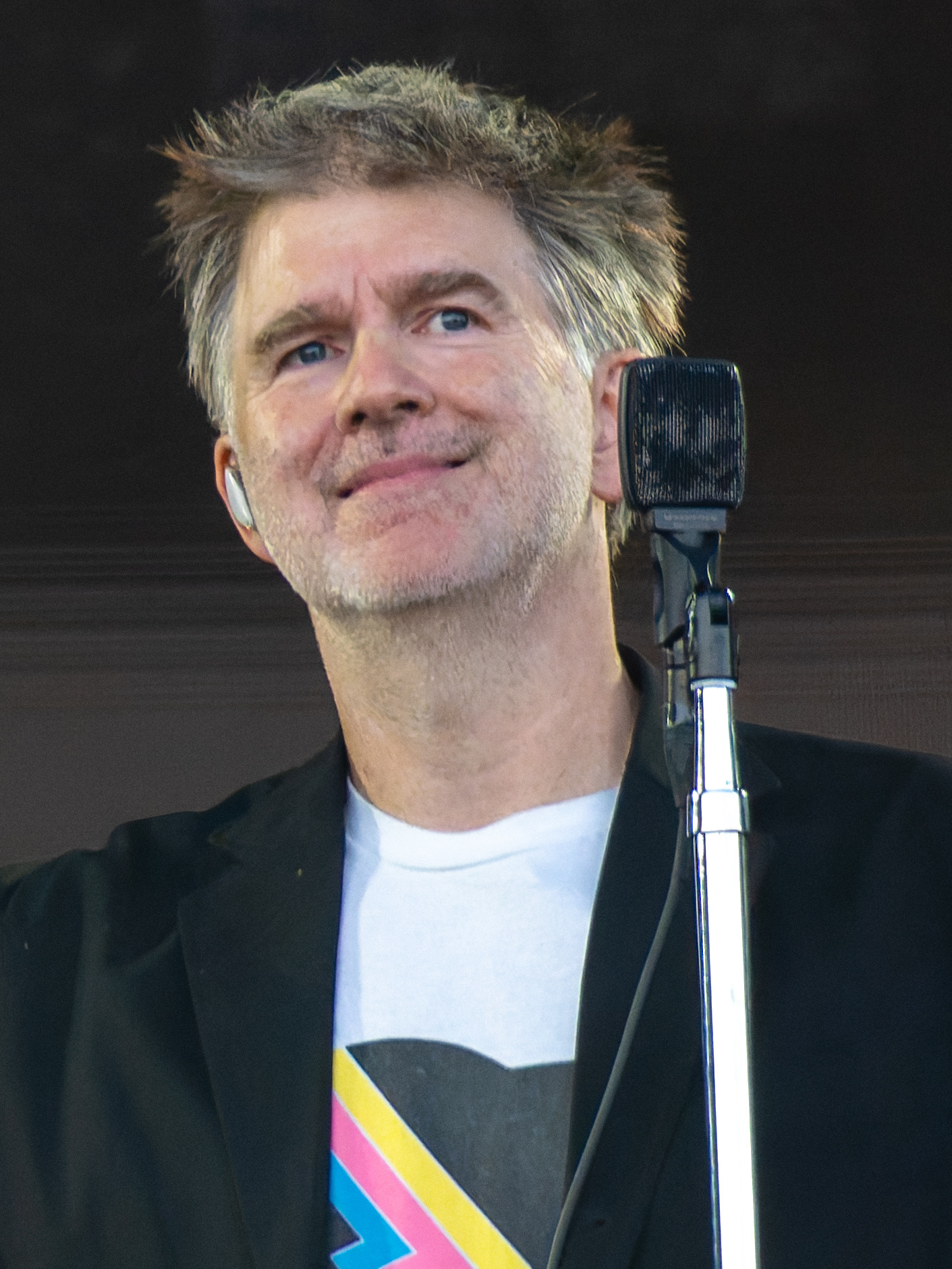
Electronic musician James Murphy (pictured in 2024) co-produced the band's fourth album, Mosquito (2013).

Songs by Yeah Yeah Yeahs
Song	Songwriter(s)	Album/EP	Year	Ref.
"10 x 10"	Brian Chase / Karen Lee Orzolek / Nick Zinner	Is Is	2007	
"Always"	Chase / Orzolek / Zinner	Mosquito	2013	
"Area 52"	Chase / Orzolek / Zinner	Mosquito	2013	
"Art Star"	Chase / Orzolek / Zinner	Yeah Yeah Yeahs	2001	
"Bang"	Chase / Orzolek / Zinner	Yeah Yeah Yeahs	2001	
"Black Tongue"	Chase / Orzolek / Zinner	Fever to Tell	2003	
"Blacktop"	Orzolek / David Andrew Sitek / Zinner	Cool It Down	2022	
"Boogers"	Chase / Orzolek / Zinner	Fever to Tell Deluxe	2017	
"Buried Alive" (featuring Dr. Octagon)	Chase / Orzolek / Zinner	Mosquito	2013	
"Burning" †	Chase / Peggy Farina / Bob Gaudio / Orzolek / Zinner	Cool It Down	2022	
"Cheated Hearts" †	Chase / Orzolek / Zinner	Show Your Bones	2006	
"Clap Song"	Chase / Orzolek / Zinner	It's Blitz! (Note: iTunes Store pre-order only.)	2009	
"Cold Light"	Chase / Orzolek / Zinner	Fever to Tell	2003	
"Countdown"	Chase / Orzolek / Zinner	—N/a	2003	
"Criminals"	Bradford Cox #	Good Music to Avert the Collapse of American Democracy, Volume 2	2020	
"Date with the Night" †	Chase / Orzolek / Zinner	Fever to Tell	2003	
"Deja Vu"	Chase / Orzolek / Zinner	Show Your Bones (Note: Bonus track for the United Kingdom releases.)	2006	
"Despair" †	Chase / Orzolek / Zinner	Mosquito	2013	
"Diamond Sea"	Chase / Orzolek / Zinner	Live Session EP (Note: Exclusive to iTunes Store.)	2006	
"Different Today"	Orzolek / Zinner	Cool It Down	2022	
"Down Boy" †	Chase / Orzolek / Zinner	Is Is	2007	
"Dragon Queen"	Chase / Orzolek / Zinner	It's Blitz!	2009	
"Dudley"	Chase / Orzolek / Zinner	Show Your Bones	2006	
"Dull Life"	Chase / Orzolek / Zinner	It's Blitz!	2009	
"Faces"	Chase / Orzolek / Zinner	It's Blitz! (Note: Bonus track for the iTunes Store and Japanese releases.)	2009	
"Fancy"	Chase / Orzolek / Zinner	Show Your Bones	2006	
"Fleez"	Chase / Orzolek / Renee Scroggins / Zinner	Cool It Down	2022	
"Fukuoka Nagoya Osaka Tokyo"	Chase / Orzolek / Zinner	Fever to Tell Deluxe	2017	
"Gold Lion" †	Chase / Orzolek / Zinner	Show Your Bones	2006	
"Graveyard"	Chase / Orzolek / Zinner	Machine	2002	
"Heads Will Roll" †	Chase / Orzolek / Zinner	It's Blitz!	2009	
"Honeybear"	Chase / Orzolek / Zinner	Show Your Bones	2006	
"Hysteric"	Chase / Orzolek / Zinner	It's Blitz!	2009	
"Isis"	Chase / Orzolek / Zinner	Is Is	2007	
"Kiss Kiss"	Chase / Orzolek / Zinner	Is Is	2007	
"Let Me Know"	Chase / Orzolek / Zinner	—N/a	2006	
"Little Shadow"	Chase / Orzolek / Zinner	It's Blitz!	2009	
"Lovebomb"	Chase / Orzolek / Zinner	Cool It Down	2022	
"Machine" †	Chase / Orzolek / Zinner	Machine	2002	
"Man"	Chase / Orzolek / Zinner	Fever to Tell	2003	
"Maps" †	Chase / Orzolek / Zinner	Fever to Tell	2003	
"Mars"	Orzolek / Justin Raisen / Zinner	Cool It Down	2022	
"Miles Away"	Chase / Orzolek / Zinner	Yeah Yeah Yeahs	2001	
"Modern Romance"	Chase / Orzolek / Zinner	Fever to Tell	2003	
"Modern Things"	Chase / Orzolek / Zinner	Fever to Tell Deluxe	2017	
"Mosquito"	Chase / Orzolek / Zinner	Mosquito	2013	
"Mr Youre on Fire Mr"	Chase / Orzolek / Zinner	—N/a	2003	
"Mysteries"	Chase / Orzolek / Zinner	Show Your Bones	2006	
"Mystery Girl"	Chase / Jack Martin / Orzolek / Zinner	Yeah Yeah Yeahs	2001	
"No No No"	Chase / Orzolek / Zinner	Fever to Tell	2003	
"Ooh Ooh Ooh"	Chase / Orzolek / Zinner	Fever to Tell Deluxe	2017	
"Our Time"	Chase / Orzolek / Zinner	Yeah Yeah Yeahs	2001	
"Phenomena"	Chase / Orzolek / Zinner	Show Your Bones	2006	
"Pin" †	Chase / Orzolek / Zinner	Fever to Tell	2003	
"Poor Song"	Chase / Orzolek / Zinner	Fever to Tell Deluxe	2017	
"Rich"	Chase / Orzolek / Zinner	Fever to Tell	2003	
"Rockers to Swallow"	Chase / Orzolek / Zinner	Is Is	2007	
"Runaway"	Chase / Orzolek / Zinner	It's Blitz!	2009	
"Sacrilege" †	Chase / Orzolek / Zinner	Mosquito	2013	
"Sealings"	Chase / Orzolek / Zinner	Music from and Inspired by Spider-Man 3	2007	
"Shake It"	Chase / Orzolek / Zinner	Fever to Tell Deluxe	2017	
"Shame and Fortune"	Chase / Orzolek / Zinner	It's Blitz!	2009	
"Sheena Is a Punk Rocker"	Joey Ramone #	War Child Presents Heroes	2009	
"Shot Down"	Chase / Orzolek / Zinner	Fever to Tell Deluxe	2017	
"Skeletons" †	Chase / Orzolek / Zinner	It's Blitz!	2009	
"Slave"	Chase / Orzolek / Zinner	Mosquito	2013	
"Soft Shock"	Chase / Orzolek / Zinner	It's Blitz!	2009	
"Spitting Off the Edge of the World" (featuring Perfume Genius) †	Chase / Orzolek / Sitek / Zinner	Cool It Down	2022	
"Subway"	Chase / Orzolek / Zinner	Mosquito	2013	
"The Sweets"	Chase / Orzolek / Zinner	Show Your Bones	2006	
"Thank You Were Wrong"	Chase / Orzolek / Zinner	—N/a	2006	
"These Paths"	Chase / Orzolek / Zinner	Mosquito	2013	
"Thirteen" †	Alex Chilton / Chris Bell #	—N/a (Note: Exclusive to Spotify.)	2018	
"Tick"	Chase / Orzolek / Zinner	Fever to Tell	2003	
"Turn Into" †	Chase / Orzolek / Zinner	Show Your Bones	2006	
"Under the Earth"	Chase / Orzolek / Zinner	Mosquito	2013	
"Warrior"	Chase / Orzolek / Zinner	Show Your Bones	2006	
"Way Out"	Chase / Orzolek / Zinner	Show Your Bones	2006	
"Wedding Song"	Chase / Orzolek / Zinner	Mosquito	2013	
"Wolf" †	Chase / Orzolek / Zinner	Cool It Down	2022	
"Y Control" †	Chase / Orzolek / Zinner	Fever to Tell	2003	
"Yeah! New York"	Chase / Orzolek / Zinner	—N/a	2003	
"Zero" †	Chase / Orzolek / Zinner	It's Blitz!	2009	

== See also ==
- Yeah Yeah Yeahs discography
