= List of awards and nominations received by Yeah Yeah Yeahs =

Yeah Yeah Yeahs awards and nominations
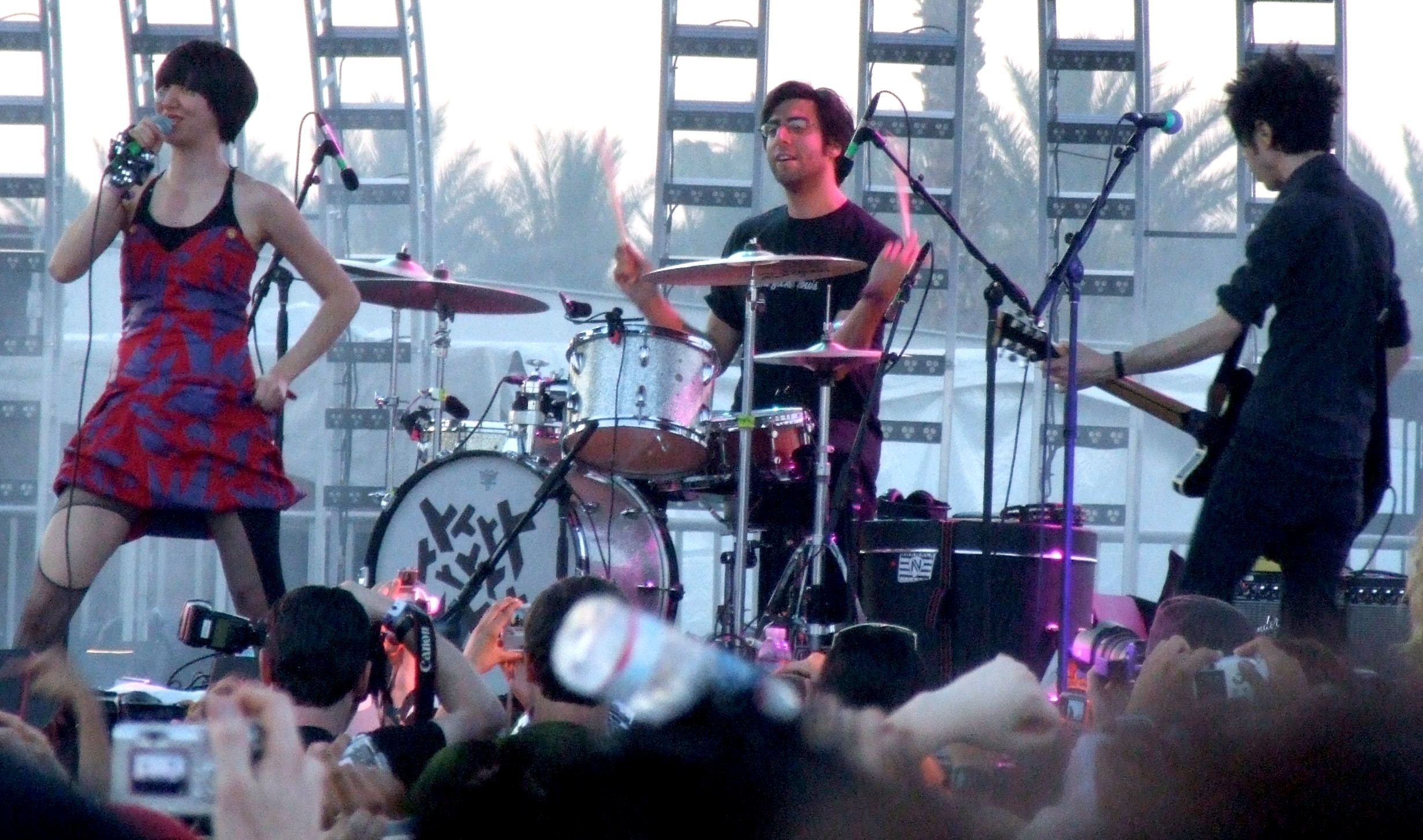
- Yeah Yeah Yeahs performing at Coachella in 2006. From left to right: Karen O, Brian Chase and Nick Zinner.
Awards and nominations
Award	Wins	Nominations
Best Art Vinyl Awards	0	1
BMI London Awards	1	1
D&AD Awards	3	3
International Dance Music Awards	0	3
Grammy Awards	0	5
Libera Awards	0	3
MTV Video Music Awards	0	7
MTVU Woodie Awards	0	2
MVPA Awards	2	3
Shortlist Music Prize	0	1
NME Awards	1	3
UK Music Video Awards	2	2
Žebřík Music Awards	0	1

Totals (Note: Certain award groups do not simply award one winner. They acknowledge several different recipients, have runners-up, and have third place. Since this is a specific recognition and is different from losing an award, runner-up mentions are considered wins in this award tally. For simplification and to avoid errors, each award in this list has been presumed to have had a prior nomination.)
- Wins: 9
- Nominations: 35

Yeah Yeah Yeahs are an American indie rock band formed in 2000 in New York City. The band consists of lead vocalist Karen O, guitarist and keyboardist Nick Zinner, and drummer Brian Chase. They have released five albums: Fever to Tell (2003), Show Your Bones (2006), It's Blitz! (2009), Mosquito (2013), and Cool It Down (2022). Fever to Tell has sold over 1,000,000 copies and became a key work of the 2000s garage rock and post-punk movements. It's Blitz has sold over 500,000 copies worldwide.

Yeah Yeah Yeahs have received 9 awards from 35 nominations. They have earned four nominations for the Grammy Award for Best Alternative Music Album for Fever to Tell, Show Your Bones, It's Blitz!, and Cool It Down; the first was also nominated for the Shortlist Music Prize. Their singles "Maps", "Heads Will Roll", and "Sacrilege" collectively received seven nominations at the MTV Video Music Awards, and "Spitting Off the Edge of the World" was nominated for the Grammy Award for Best Alternative Music Performance.

== Awards and nominations ==
Awards and nominations received by Yeah Yeah Yeahs
Award	Year (Note: Indicates the year of ceremony. Each year is linked to the article about the awards held that year, wherever possible.)	Recipient(s) and nominee(s)	Category	Result	Ref.
Best Art Vinyl Awards	2022	Cool It Down	Best Art Vinyl	Nominated	
BMI London Awards	2007	"Gold Lion"	Pop Award	Won	
D&AD Awards	2005	"Y Control"	Direction	Won	
D&AD Awards	2014	"Sacrilege"	Cinematography	Won	
D&AD Awards	2014	"Sacrilege"	Editing	Won	
Grammy Awards	2004	Fever to Tell	Best Alternative Music Album	Nominated	
Grammy Awards	2007	Show Your Bones	Best Alternative Music Album	Nominated	
Grammy Awards	2010	It's Blitz!	Best Alternative Music Album	Nominated	
Grammy Awards	2023	Cool It Down	Best Alternative Music Album	Nominated	
Grammy Awards	2023	"Spitting Off the Edge of the World"	Best Alternative Music Performance	Nominated	
International Dance Music Awards	2010	Yeah Yeah Yeahs	Best Artist (Group)	Nominated	
International Dance Music Awards	2010	It's Blitz!	Best Artist Album	Nominated	
International Dance Music Awards	2010	"Heads Will Roll"	Best Alternative Rock/Dance Track	Nominated	
Libera Awards	2023	Cool It Down	Marketing Genius	Nominated	
Libera Awards	2023	"Spitting Off the Edge of the World"	Video of the Year	Nominated	
Libera Awards	2026	"Burning"	Best Sync Usage	Nominated	
MTV Video Music Awards	2004	"Maps"	Best Art Direction	Nominated	
MTV Video Music Awards	2004	"Maps"	Best Editing	Nominated	
MTV Video Music Awards	2004	"Maps"	Best Cinematography	Nominated	
MTV Video Music Awards	2004	"Maps"	MTV2 Award	Nominated	
MTV Video Music Awards	2009	"Heads Will Roll"	Breakthrough Video	Nominated	
MTV Video Music Awards	2013	"Sacrilege"	Best Direction	Nominated	
MTV Video Music Awards	2013	"Sacrilege"	Best Cinematography	Nominated	
MTVU Woodies	2004	"Maps"	Woodie of the Year	Nominated	
MTVU Woodies	2009	"Heads Will Roll"	Best Video Woodie	Nominated	
MVPA Awards	2005	"Y Control"	Alternative Video of the Year	Won	
MVPA Awards	2007	"Gold Lion"	Cinematography	Nominated	
MVPA Awards	2009	"Zero"	Best Rock Video	Won	
NME Awards	2003	Yeah Yeah Yeahs	Philip Hall Hot New Band Award	Won	
NME Awards	2010	"Zero"	Best Dancefloor Filler	Nominated	
NME Awards	2010	Yeah Yeah Yeahs	Best International Band	Nominated	
Shortlist Music Prize	2003	Fever to Tell	Album of the Year	Nominated	
UK Music Video Awards	2013	"Sacrilege"	Best Rock/Indie Video	Won	
UK Music Video Awards	2013	"Sacrilege"	Best Editing	Won	
Žebřík Music Awards	2009	Yeah Yeah Yeahs	Discovery of the Year	Nominated	
