= Hidden in Pieces Tour =

2025 concert tour by Yeah Yeah Yeahs

- Tour by Yeah Yeah Yeahs
- Promotional poster
- Location: Europe; North America
- Start date: June 16, 2025
- End date: July 30, 2025
- No. of shows: 16

Yeah Yeah Yeahs concert chronology
- Cool It Down Tour (2022); Hidden in Pieces Tour (2025)

The Hidden in Pieces Tour was a concert tour by the American indie rock band Yeah Yeah Yeahs. Staged to celebrate the band's 25th anniversary, the concert comprised acoustic renditions of select songs from their discography, backed by string and piano sections. The tour exclusively visited theatres in North America and England. It was followed by a short film and the live album, Hidden in Pieces: Live at the Royal Albert Hall, released in September and October 2026 respectively.

== Development ==
After a long hiatus from recording, Yeah Yeah Yeahs returned with their fifth album Cool It Down, released in 2022 and netting a critical resurgence for the band. To promote the record, Yeah Yeah Yeahs played a small set of shows in June, July, and October 2022, and toured internationally from May to August 2023, their first tour in ten years.

They celebrated 25 years of the band's existence in 2025, and announced the Hidden in Pieces Tour in March of that year. With the tour, they aimed to "showcase the band's catalog reimagined in a captivating new light, performing in intimate theater settings across both North America and the UK." The tour ran from June to July 2025, visiting theatres in North America and England.

== Reception ==
The Hidden in Pieces Tour was critically acclaimed, with reviewers praising the vulnerability displayed through the softer renditions of the band's discography. Todd Inoue of the San Francisco Chronicle wrote, "A great YYY song has the power to propel you to the top of the world. These new versions make you feel like you're floating in an alternate universe, a zoom-out that allows for even deeper examination and introspection." Writing for The Times, Mark Beaumont observed that "Stars burst, heavens shook, spontaneous standing ovations broke out and New York indie sleaze's greatest party band became something several spheres above." Chicago Sun-Times's Selena Fragassi remarked, "For a band 25 years into their craft and plucked from New York's rough-on-the-edges, turn-of-the-century indie rock scene, seeing Yeah Yeah Yeahs so soft in their approach was refreshingly unexpected but also the true hallmark of artists not afraid of reinvention."

Of the choice to perform acoustic renditions, Julyssa Lopez from Rolling Stone called it "a bare-naked revelation of the intimacy and emotion that has always been there." In a review for Forbes, David Chiu believed "The alchemy among the three band members remained intact after a quarter of a century together: O with her commanding voice and dazzling stage presence; Zinner’s buzzing, angular guitar sound; and Chase’s propulsive and explosive drumming were all in full force Wednesday night."

== Tour dates ==
List of 2025 concerts
Date	City	Country	Venue	Ref.
June 16, 2025	Manchester	England	O2 Apollo	
June 18, 2025	London	England	Royal Albert Hall	
June 19, 2025	London	England	Royal Albert Hall	
June 30, 2025	Mexico City	Mexico	Teatro Metropólitan	
July 1, 2025	Mexico City	Mexico	Teatro Metropólitan	
July 9, 2025	Los Angeles	United States	Orpheum Theatre	
July 10, 2025	Los Angeles	United States	Orpheum Theatre	
July 11, 2025	Los Angeles	United States	Orpheum Theatre	
July 14, 2025	San Francisco	United States	Louise M. Davies Symphony Hall	
July 15, 2025	San Francisco	United States	Louise M. Davies Symphony Hall	
July 18, 2025	Nashville	United States	Ryman Auditorium	
July 19, 2025	Nashville	United States	Ryman Auditorium	
July 22, 2025	Chicago	United States	Chicago Theatre	
July 23, 2025	Chicago	United States	Chicago Theatre	
July 29, 2025	New York City	United States	Beacon Theatre	
July 30, 2025	New York City	United States	Beacon Theatre	

== Hidden in Pieces: Live at the Royal Albert Hall ==
Hidden in Pieces: Live at the Royal Albert Hall

Live album by Yeah Yeah Yeahs
- Released: September 1, 2026
- Genre: Alternative rock
- Length: 54:59
- Label: Secretly Canadian
- Producer: Yeah Yeah Yeahs

Hidden in Pieces: Live at the Royal Albert Hall (or simply Hidden in Pieces: Live) is the first live album by Yeah Yeah Yeahs. It was first released by Secretly Canadian on September 1, 2026, and an expanded deluxe edition was released on October 23, 2026. The album consists of recordings of two performances at the Royal Albert Hall in June 2026, while the deluxe edition includes snippets of shows in San Diego, Chicago, New York and Mexico City.

Megan Buerger of Pitchfork rated the album 7.4 out of 10, writing: "the band offers warmth and muscle: raw, exposed vocals, and swelling crescendos built with sweat. That this much power survives without the synths and drum machines is a thrill; they may have stopped crawling and thrashing around stages, but they’ve still got teeth."

=== Track listing ===
All tracks are written by Yeah Yeah Yeahs with additional arrangements by Jherek Bischoff, except "Hyperballad", written by Björk.

Standard edition
No.	Title	Length
1.	"In Heaven (Live at the Royal Albert Hall)"	1:27
2.	"Blacktop (Live at the Royal Albert Hall)"	5:24
3.	"Gold Lion (Live at the Royal Albert Hall)"	3:52
4.	"Hyperballad (Live at the Royal Albert Hall)"	3:16
5.	"Cheated Hearts (Live at the Royal Albert Hall)"	4:28
6.	"Isis (Live at the Royal Albert Hall)"	2:04
7.	"Warrior (Live at the Royal Albert Hall)"	4:09
8.	"Skeletons (Live at the Royal Albert Hall)"	5:14
9.	"Runaway (Live at the Royal Albert Hall)"	5:27
10.	"Spitting Off the Edge of the World (Live at the Royal Albert Hall)"	5:35
11.	"Mars (Live at the Royal Albert Hall)"	2:16
12.	"Maps (Live at the Royal Albert Hall)"	6:33
13.	"Zero (Live at the Royal Albert Hall)"	5:09
Total length:		54:59

Deluxe edition
No.	Title	Length
1.	"In Heaven (Live at the Royal Albert Hall)"	1:27
2.	"Blacktop (Live at the Royal Albert Hall)"	5:24
3.	"Gold Lion (Live at the Royal Albert Hall)"	3:52
4.	"Hyperballad (Live at the Royal Albert Hall)"	3:16
5.	"Cheated Hearts (Live at the Royal Albert Hall)"	4:28
6.	"Isis (Live at the Royal Albert Hall)"	2:04
7.	"Warrior (Live at the Royal Albert Hall)"	4:09
8.	"Skeletons (Live at the Royal Albert Hall)"	5:14
9.	"Runaway (Live at the Royal Albert Hall)"	5:27
10.	"Spitting Off the Edge of the World (Live at the Royal Albert Hall)"	5:35
11.	"Mars (Live at the Royal Albert Hall)"	2:16
12.	"Maps (Live at the Royal Albert Hall)"	6:33
13.	"Zero (Live at the Royal Albert Hall)"	5:09
14.	"Y Control (Live in San Diego)"	3:51
15.	"Let Me Know (Live in San Diego)"	3:44
16.	"Hysteric (Live at the Beacon Theatre)"	4:31
17.	"Despair (Live at the Chicago Theatre)"	5:15
18.	"Little Shadow (Live in San Diego)"	5:23
19.	"Maps (Live at Teatro Metrópolitan)"	6:43
20.	"Isis (Live at the Orpheum Theatre)"	4:20
21.	"In Heaven (Sonic Ranch)"	0:54
22.	"Blacktop (Sonic Ranch)"	5:11
Total length:		94:46

=== Personnel ===
Credits are adapted from the liner notes of Hidden in Pieces: Live at the Royal Albert Hall and Apple Music.

Yeah Yeah Yeahs

- Brian Chase – drums, percussion
- Karen O – vocals
- Nick Zinner – acoustic guitar, electric guitar, synthesizer

Additional musicians

- Jherek Bischoff – bass, conductor, fretless guitar, piano, shaker, synthesizer
- Imaad Wasif – acoustic guitar, electric guitar, piano

Technical personnel

- Daniel Good – recording engineer
- Matt Lynch – mastering
- Kennie Takahashi – mixing
