= ITunes Originals: Yeah Yeah Yeahs =

iTunes Originals: Yeah Yeah Yeahs

Compilation album by Yeah Yeah Yeahs
- Released: October 20, 2009
- Genre: Indie rock; art punk; garage punk
- Length: 55:58
- Label: DGC; Interscope

Yeah Yeah Yeahs chronology
| It's Blitz! (2009) | iTunes Originals: Yeah Yeah Yeahs (2009) | Mosquito (2013) |

Professional ratings
Review scores
| Source | Rating |
|---|---|
| Pitchfork | 7.0/10 |
| Rolling Stone | 3.5/5 stars |

iTunes Originals: Yeah Yeah Yeahs is a compilation album by American indie rock band Yeah Yeah Yeahs, released exclusively through the iTunes Store on October 20, 2009, as part of the iTunes Originals series. The album consists of both acoustic versions and original studio recordings of the band's songs, as well as interview tracks.

== Track listing ==
| No. | Title | Length |
|---|---|---|
| 1. | "iTunes Originals" | 0:03 |
| 2. | "It's the Year to Be Hated" (interview) | 2:39 |
| 3. | "Our Time" (iTunes Originals version) | 3:08 |
| 4. | "A Love Song in the Truest Sense" (interview) | 2:28 |
| 5. | "Maps" (iTunes Originals version) | 3:49 |
| 6. | "Conga Line Around a Dead Dog" (interview) | 1:34 |
| 7. | "Y Control" | 4:02 |
| 8. | "The Studio as Laboratory" (interview) | 2:29 |
| 9. | "Gold Lion" | 3:08 |
| 10. | "Back from the Dead" (interview) | 1:11 |
| 11. | "Cheated Hearts" | 3:58 |
| 12. | "Darker Side of Yeah Yeah Yeahs" (interview) | 1:41 |
| 13. | "Down Boy" | 3:54 |
| 14. | "Something Tangy, Something Sour" (interview) | 1:16 |
| 15. | "Dull Life" (iTunes Originals version) | 3:47 |
| 16. | "Glam Rock Murder on the Dancefloor" (interview) | 1:30 |
| 17. | "Heads Will Roll" | 3:41 |
| 18. | "Rewarding Love Song" (interview) | 1:26 |
| 19. | "Hysteric" (iTunes Originals version) | 4:10 |
| 20. | "Range of Musicanship [sic]" (interview) | 1:28 |
| 21. | "Runaway" (iTunes Originals version) | 4:36 |

== Release history ==
| Region | Date | Format | Label | Ref. |
|---|---|---|---|---|
| Canada | October 20, 2009 | Digital download | DGC; Interscope | |
| United States | October 20, 2009 | Digital download | DGC; Interscope | |
| Australia | November 26, 2009 | Digital download | DGC; Interscope | |
| Germany | November 26, 2009 | Digital download | DGC; Interscope | |
| United Kingdom | November 26, 2009 | Digital download | DGC; Interscope | |
