= Phenomena (song) =

Song by Yeah Yeah Yeahs

from the album Show Your Bones
- Recorded: 2005–2006
- Genre: Indie rock; garage punk
- Length: 4:10
- Label: Interscope
- Songwriters: Brian Chase; Karen Lee Orzolek; Nick Zinner

"Phenomena" is a song written by Brian Chase, Karen Lee Orzolek, Nick Zinner and recorded by the Yeah Yeah Yeahs from their Show Your Bones album, released on Interscope/Polydor in 2006.

== Details ==
The song's refrain, "Something like a phenomenon", echoes previous uses in recordings such as Liquid Liquid's "Cavern".

The song was featured in the 2008 horror film, The Ruins, and a 2013 Cadillac television advertisement. It was also featured on the first episode of the miniseries Flesh and Bone (2015).
