= Tell Me What Rockers to Swallow =

2004 DVD by Yeah Yeah Yeahs

Video by Yeah Yeah Yeahs
- Released: October 19, 2004
- Genre: Indie rock
- Length: 138 min
- Label: Interscope
- Producer: Lance Bangs

Tell Me What Rockers to Swallow is a music DVD released by the Yeah Yeah Yeahs on October 25, 2004, through Polydor. The main feature of the DVD is the band's live performance at The Fillmore in San Francisco on March 17, 2004, with bonus songs recorded during the previous day's performance. The DVD was directed and produced by Lance Bangs.

The DVD also features a behind the scenes documentary on the band's tour in Japan, interviews with the band, and all the music videos released by the time of the DVD's release, along with their performance of "Maps" at the MTV Movie Awards.

Spike Jonze is amongst the camera operators for the concert recording, and he is also featured in interviews on the DVD, as is director, Lance Bangs.

Michelle Zauner (Japanese Breakfast) described the influence of the concert: “My friend had the DVD of the Yeah Yeah Yeahs live at the Fillmore. Seeing Karen O for the first time changed my life. She spat water all over herself and used the microphone in ways I had never seen before... Finding out that she was half-Korean in the super white male dominated industry was just mind blowing. It was such a life-changing moment for me... I felt so connected to her and she was such an important role model in my life.”

== Track listing ==
The track listing of the concert is as follows:

1. "Y-Control"
2. "Black Tongue"
3. "Rockers to Swallow"
4. "Down Boy"
5. "Cold Light"
6. "Machine"
7. "Modern Things"
8. "Cheated Hearts"
9. "Mystery Girl"
10. "Maps"
11. "Date with the Night"
12. "Miles Away"
13. "Poor Song"
14. "Our Time"
15. "Art Star"
16. "Modern Romance"

Bonus songs

1. "10x10"
2. "Rich"
3. "Black Tongue"
4. "Sealings"
5. "Miles Away"
6. "Tick"
