= Turn Into (song) =

2006 single by Yeah Yeah Yeahs

Single by Yeah Yeah Yeahs

from the album Show Your Bones
- Released: June 19, 2006
- Length: 4:04
- Label: Interscope
- Songwriter(s): Brian Chase, Karen Lee Orzolek, Nick Zinner
- Producer(s): David Andrew Sitek, Yeah Yeah Yeahs

Yeah Yeah Yeahs singles chronology
"Gold Lion" (2004)	"Turn Into" (2006)	"Cheated Hearts" (2006)

"Turn Into" is the second single that released from Show Your Bones, the second LP by the Yeah Yeah Yeahs.

== Track listing ==
1. "Turn Into"
2. "Turn Into" (Nick Zinner remix)
3. "Maps" (Live From Roseland)

== Charts ==
Chart (2006)	Peak position
Irish Singles Chart	37
UK Singles Chart	53
