= Marva Hicks =

American singer and actress (1956–2022)

- Born: Marva Denise Hicks; May 5, 1956; Petersburg, Virginia, U.S.
- Died: September 16, 2022 (aged 66) New York City, U.S.
- Genres: Soul, Broadway theatre
- Occupations: Singer, actress
- Years active: 1978–2022
- Label: Polydor Records

Marva Denise Hicks (May 5, 1956 – September 16, 2022) was an American R&B singer and actress. She signed with Polydor in the late 1980s, recorded her self-titled album in 1991, and later worked in Broadway theatre and on television.

== Life and career ==
Hicks was born and grew up in Petersburg, Virginia, and studied at Howard University.

Initially a gospel singer, she recorded commercial secular music in the late 1970s, first releasing her debut single "Looking Over My Shoulder" in 1978, before being a member of the short-lived quintet Eighties Ladies. The quintet released their only album Ladies of the 80s in 1980, which was entirely produced by Roy Ayers and Edwin Birdsong. In 1991, Hicks released her self-titled debut album and scored her biggest chart hit with the single "Never Been in Love Before", written and produced by Jimmy Scott. The record peaked at number seven on the R&B charts in 1991, while two singles followed. On July 16, 1996, she performed as a background singer for Michael Jackson in a free concert at the Jerudong Park Amphitheatre in Bandar Seri Begawan. The concert was in celebration of the fiftieth birthday of Hassanal Bolkiah, the Sultan of Brunei and was attended by the Brunei Royal Family. As part of the set list, Hicks sang the female part of the duet "I Just Can't Stop Loving You" with Jackson. She also performed as a background singer during Michael Jackson's HIStory World Tour.

She also performed as Rafiki in The Lion King, as an understudy for the leading actress. Her other Broadway credits included Motown: The Musical, and Lena Horne, The Lady and Her Music. She won the Helen Hayes Award for her stage work on three occasions.

On television, she played T'Pel, the wife of Tuvok, in two episodes of Star Trek: Voyager, and appeared in several other recurring roles in other series. She sang the gospel song "There's No Hiding Place Down Here" in the Babylon 5 episode "And the Rock Cried Out, No Hiding Place".

In 2013, Hicks appeared on the Yeah Yeah Yeahs' album Mosquito, performing as part of Broadway Inspirational Voices on the first single "Sacrilege". In 2020, she played Tallulah Clarke in the world premiere of the musical Gun & Powder.

She died from glioblastoma in New York City on September 16, 2022, at the age of 66.

== Discography ==
=== Studio albums ===
- Ladies of the 80s (with Eighties Ladies) (1980, Uno Melodic)
- Marva Hicks (1991, Polydor)

=== Singles ===
- "Looking Over My Shoulder" (1978, Infinity)
- "I Got You Where I Want" (1991, Polydor)
- "Never Been in Love Before" (1991, Polydor)
- "One Good Reason" (1991, Polydor)

== Filmography ==
=== Film ===
Year	Title	Role	Notes
1987	Enemy Territory	Hysterical Woman	
1993	Bodies, Rest & Motion	Singer	
1995	Virtuosity	Onscreen Talent	
1995	Alien Nation: Body and Soul	Balboa	TV movie
1996	For the Future: The Irvine Fertility Scandal	Tanya	TV movie
1998	The Brave Little Toaster Goes to Mars	Singer (voice)	Video
1999	Asunder	Roberta Williams	
2000	In a Blue Mood	Iris Blue	Short
2005	On the One	Cora Lee	
2007	AfterLife	Alicia	Short
2013	Labor Day	Morning Anchor	

=== Television ===
Year	Title	Role	Notes
1992–93	L.A. Law	Lee Johnson	Episode: "Love on the Rox" & "Spanky and the Art Gang"
1993–95	Mad About You	Remy	Recurring Cast: Season 2–3
1994	The Bold and the Beautiful	Stewardess	Episode: "Episode #1.1745"
1994	The Sinbad Show	Rachel	Episode: "Love Lessons"
1994	South Central	-	Episode: "CO-op"
1994–96	Sister, Sister	Various	4 Episodes
1995–2000	Star Trek: Voyager	T'Pel	Guest Cast: Season 2 & 5 & 7
1996	Babylon 5	Singer	Episode: "And the Rock Cried Out, No Hiding Place"
1997–98	One Life to Live	Jacara Principal	Regular Cast
2008	E! True Hollywood Story	Herself	Episode: "Star Jones"
2013	House of Cards	Strategist 1	Episode: "Chapter 5"
2015	Daredevil	District Attorney	Episode: "Daredevil"
2016	Search Party	Virginia	Episode: "The Return of the Forgotten Phantom"
2017	The Blacklist	Judge	Episode: "Smokey Putnum (No. 30)"
2019	Madam Secretary	Chief Clerk	Episode: "The New Normal"
