= Heads Will Roll (song) =

2009 single by Yeah Yeah Yeahs

Single by Yeah Yeah Yeahs

from the album It's Blitz!
- Released: June 29, 2009
- Genre: Dance-rock; alternative rock
- Length: 3:42
- Label: DGC; Interscope; Polydor
- Songwriters: Brian Chase; Karen Orzolek; Nick Zinner
- Producers: Nick Launay; David Andrew Sitek

Yeah Yeah Yeahs singles chronology
"Zero" (2009)	"Heads Will Roll" (2009)	"Skeletons" (2010)

Music video
- "Heads Will Roll" on YouTube

"Heads Will Roll" is a song by American indie rock band Yeah Yeah Yeahs from their third studio album, It's Blitz! (2009). It was released by DGC, Interscope and Polydor Records as the album's second single in June 2009. Written by the band with production by Nick Launay and David Andrew Sitek, "Heads Will Roll" is a dance-rock song, shifting from their previous garage rock and art punk influences, about an ill-fated night on the dancefloor.

"Heads Will Roll" was a commercial success and became the band's best-selling single, reaching the top ten of three Billboard charts and certified double platinum; it also charted in six other countries. Richard Ayoade directed its accompanying music video, which was nominated for a MTV Video Music Award. A remix by Canadian artist A-Trak further heightened the song's popularity, being placed on Rolling Stone's list of the 200 greatest dance songs.

== Background and recording ==
Yeah Yeah Yeahs, composed of singer/songwriter Karen O, guitarist Nick Zinner, and drummer Brian Chase, became prominent figures in the 2000s garage rock and post-punk revivals and stood at the forefront of the New York music scene. Following their breakthrough with their 2003 landmark debut album Fever to Tell, the band aimed to reinvent themselves with every subsequent record. Karen O explained, "We put out a record every three years now; we could easily be forgotten. If you look at a lot of our peers that we came up with, a lot of them have disappeared."

After the troubled production of Show Your Bones (2006), their second album, Yeah Yeah Yeahs would wait until 2008 to begin work on their next effort. The band wrote all the songs for It's Blitz! during the album's production and shifted to a dance-punk and pop rock sound. They recorded at five different studios and took several breaks to keep inspiration fresh; one of these five sessions spawned "Heads Will Roll".

== Music and lyrics ==
"Heads Will Roll" is characterized as a dance-rock and alternative rock song that runs for three minutes and 42 seconds. According to sheet music published by Universal Music Publishing Group, it is composed in 4/4 time in the key of G minor with a tempo of 132 beats per minute. Its lyrics, written by Karen O, are about an ill-fated night on the dancefloor, which was inspired by horror stories.

The song is driven by a vintage string riff played by Zinner, which was created with a sample from a Mellotron sound card. It utilizes pre-recorded samples of Chase's drums and Zinner's ARP synthesizer, contrasting the band's previous recording sessions.

== Music video ==
The song's music video was directed by Richard Ayoade, and premiered on NME on May 26, 2009. It features the band playing in a (presumably) underground venue when a dancing werewolf whose dancing is reminiscent of Michael Jackson (who died four days before the single was released and 30 days after the music video premiered) appears on stage. A light flashes halfway through the music video and the werewolf transforms. He then proceeds to chase after the audience and kills most of them. The video then ends with the band having been murdered while Karen O continues singing, her head severed from her body.

The music video contains some mockery of horror in general; instead of blood, there is red glitter and confetti and Karen O keeps singing while decapitated. In the UK, there are two different versions of this video, the second replacing the violent conclusion with repeated clips from the previous section of the video, but it shows the confetti falling onto the band.

The video was nominated for the MTV Video Music Award for Breakthrough Video.

== A-Trak remix ==
"Heads Will Roll (A-Trak Remix)"

Remix by Yeah Yeah Yeahs and A-Trak
- Genre: Dance; house
- Length: 6:23 (original mix); 3:23 (radio edit)
- Songwriters: Brian Chase; Karen Orzolek; Nick Zinner
- Producer: Alain Macklovitch

A remix by Canadian artist A-Trak was released on November 17, 2009. The original mix runs for six minutes and 23 seconds, while a radio edit shortened it by three minutes. It was ranked at number 124 on Rolling Stone's list of "The 200 Greatest Dance Songs of All Time".

== Other versions ==
"Heads Will Roll" was performed by Scarlett Johansson in 2021 for the animated film Sing 2.

Figure skater Amber Glenn used a version of "Heads Will Roll" during the 2023–24 season and went on to win the 2024 U.S. Figure Skating Championships. The song was also used as the BBC Sport theme song for the 2025 UEFA Women's Euro Championship.

In 2023, English producer Nia Archives released "Off Wiv Ya Headz," a jungle track that samples the A-Trak remix of "Heads Will Roll". The track features in the 2026 film Finding Emily.

== Track listings ==
Digital download
No.	Title	Length
1.	"Heads Will Roll"	3:42
2.	"Heads Will Roll" (Passion Pit Remix)	4:40

== Charts ==
=== Weekly charts ===
Chart (2009–2012)	Peak position
Belgium (Ultratop 50 Flanders)	1
Belgium (Ultratop 50 Wallonia)	7
France (SNEP)	45
Germany (GfK)	73
Ireland (IRMA)	70
Scottish Singles Sales (Official Charts)	75
UK Singles (Official Charts)	89
US Alternative Digital Songs (Billboard)	7
US Dance Singles Sales (Billboard)	1
US Hot Singles Sales (Billboard)	5

=== Year-end charts ===
Chart (2010)	Position
Belgium (Ultratop 50 Flanders)	16
Belgium (Ultratop 50 Wallonia)	57

== Certifications ==
Region	Certification	Certified units/sales
Belgium (BRMA)	Gold	15,000^{*}
Brazil (Pro-Música Brasil)	Gold	30,000^{‡}
Germany (BVMI)	3× Gold	450,000^{‡}
New Zealand (RMNZ)	2× Platinum	60,000^{‡}
Spain (Promusicae)	Gold	30,000^{‡}
United Kingdom (BPI)	2× Platinum	1,200,000^{‡}
^{*} Sales figures based on certification alone.^{‡} Sales+streaming figures based on certification alone.
