= Skeletons (Yeah Yeah Yeahs song) =

- Limited edition 7" sleeve designed by Nick Zinner

Single by Yeah Yeah Yeahs

from the album It's Blitz!
- Released: March 1, 2010 (7" vinyl); January 31, 2010 (iTunes Store)
- Genre: Art rock; new wave; electronica
- Length: 5:02
- Label: Interscope
- Songwriters: Brian Chase, Karen Orzolek, Nick Zinner
- Producers: Nick Launay, Dave Sitek

Yeah Yeah Yeahs singles chronology
"Heads Will Roll" (2009)	"Skeletons" (2010)	"Sacrilege" (2013)

Music video
- "Skeletons" on YouTube

"Skeletons" is the third single from the Yeah Yeah Yeahs' third album It's Blitz!. The 7" edition of the single, limited to 500 copies, was released on March 1, 2010. The single was also released on January 31, 2010, in the iTunes Store. Icelandic band Of Monsters and Men covered the song in 2013.

== Cover artwork ==
The photograph on the 7" vinyl sleeve was created by the band's guitarist Nick Zinner, who is a professional photographer. The artwork features a barn in rural Massachusetts during a snowstorm, and is a reference to the location where the song was written.

== Track list ==
7"
No.	Title	Length
1.	"Skeletons"	5:02
2.	"Skeletons" (Acoustic)	3:34

== Record Store Day Release ==
A limited edition 7" 33 1/3 RPM vinyl copy of "Skeletons" was released for Record Store Day in 2010. The record contained the single, as well as, a B-side of the song being played live at the Music Hall of Williamsburg in Brooklyn New York. The live version of the song was mixed and engineered by Harley Zinker and Tom Carlisle at Fireplace Studios in New York.
