= Sacrilege (song) =

Single by Yeah Yeah Yeahs

from the album Mosquito
- Released: February 25, 2013
- Genre: Art rock; gospel; indie rock
- Length: 3:50
- Label: Interscope
- Songwriters: Brian Chase; Karen Lee Orzolek; Nick Zinner
- Producers: David Andrew Sitek; Nick Launay

Yeah Yeah Yeahs singles chronology
"Skeletons" (2010)	"Sacrilege" (2013)	"Despair" (2013)

Music video
- "Sacrilege" on YouTube

"Sacrilege" is a song by the American indie rock band Yeah Yeah Yeahs, from their fourth studio album, Mosquito (2013). It was issued for digital download in February 2013 and released as a single by Interscope in April 2013. Produced by previous collaborators of the band, David Andrew Sitek of TV on the Radio and Nick Launay, it is an art rock song featuring a gospel choir of twenty-two voices.

== Performances ==
The band appeared on Late Show with David Letterman on April 5, 2013 to perform "Sacrilege", accompanied by the gospel choir Broadway Inspirational Voices.

== Reception ==
"Sacrilege" was named "Best New Track" by Pitchfork Media February 26, 2013. Dan Martinson stated in his positive review, "Karen O falls for an angel who falls from the sky, the constant clank of Brian Chase's cymbals and Nick Zinner's guitar curlicues evoke "Gimme Shelter" with an exaggerated gospel swing."

== Music video ==
The music video was directed by French collective Megaforce and premiered on March 26, 2013. The video stars English model and actress Lily Cole. The video consists of a chronologically reversed sequence of events outlining the rationale and events leading to a group of people in a small town shooting a man and burning a promiscuous woman (Cole) alive. The band does not appear in the video.

== In popular culture ==
In July 2013, "Sacrilege" was featured in the season three premiere episode of Suits.

In October 2013, "Sacrilege" was featured across the closing scenes of the second episode of The Originals.

The song was used in the September 2023 premiere episode of Wilderness, played while Jenna Coleman's character lashes out and burns her cheating husband's (Oliver Jackson-Cohen, not present in scene) clothes.

In Season 1, Episode 8 of Kaos, released August 2024, Sacrilege plays over the closing climactic scenes as Zeus (Jeff Goldblum) discovers he is bleeding, Hera (Janet McTeer) abandons Olympus, Hades (David Thewlis) encounters Canaeus (Misia Butler) renewing his mother's soul, and Ariadne (Leila Farzad) plans with Andromache (Amanda Douge) to rebuild Troy and destroy Olympus.

The song was featured in the second trailer for The Social Reckoning in August 2026.

== Track listing ==
All tracks are written by Yeah Yeah Yeahs.

Digital download and vinyl
No.	Title	Length
1.	"Sacrilege"	3:50
2.	"Mosquito" (Live from Area 52)	3:22

== Personnel ==
Credits are adapted from the liner notes of Mosquito.

Yeah Yeah Yeahs

- Brian Chase – drums, cymbals, percussion, vocals
- Karen O – vocals, bass, keyboards
- Nick Zinner – guitars, bass, keyboards, vocals

Additional musicians

- Debra Barsha – choir vocal arrangement
- Michael McElroy – choir leader
- Danielle Chambers – choir
- Shayna Cook – choir
- Bradley Dean – choir
- Laura Dean – choir
- Tanesha Gray – choir
- Lucia Giannetta – choir
- Renee Goldsberry – choir
- Danielle L. Greaves – choir
- Marva Hicks – choir
- Zonya Johnson – choir
- Chelsea Krombach – choir
- Adriane Lenox – choir
- Lisa Lynne Mathis – choir
- Travis Morin – choir
- Jesse Nager – choir
- John Eric Parker – choir
- Desiree Rodriguez – choir
- Eliseo Roman – choir
- Michael Seelbach – choir
- Virginia Woodruff – choir

Additional personnel

- Nick Launay – production, recording, engineering
- Beomsik Shimbe Shim – artwork
- Craig Silvey – mixing
- David Andrew Sitek – production, recording, engineering

== Charts ==
Chart performance for "Sacrilege"
Chart (2013)	Peak position
Belgium (Ultratop 50 Flanders)	74
UK Singles (OCC)	137
UK Physical Singles (OCC)	36
US Alternative Airplay (Billboard)	33
US Hot Rock Songs (Billboard)	49
