= Is Is =

EP by Yeah Yeah Yeahs
- Released: July 24, 2007
- Recorded: Stratosphere Studios, NYC
- Genres: Indie rock; art punk; garage punk
- Length: 17:47
- Labels: Interscope (U.S.); Polydor (UK); Modular
- Producers: Nick Launay; Yeah Yeah Yeahs

Yeah Yeah Yeahs chronology
Show Your Bones (2006)	Is Is (2007)	It's Blitz! (2009)

Yeah Yeah Yeahs singles chronology
"Cheated Hearts" (2006)	"Down Boy" (2007)	"Zero" (2009)

Professional ratings
Aggregate scores
Source	Rating
Metacritic	(78/100)
Review scores
Source	Rating
AllMusic	3.5/5 stars
The A.V. Club	C
Drowned in Sound	(7/10)
Hot Press	(favorable)
The New York Times	(favorable)
NME	(8/10)
Now	4/5 stars
Pitchfork	(8.2/10)
Prefix Magazine	(positive)
Robert Christgau	(2-star Honorable Mention)
The Rolling Stone Album Guide	4/5 stars
Stylus Magazine	B+

Is Is is the third EP by the indie rock band Yeah Yeah Yeahs, released on July 24, 2007. Songs for the EP were written in 2004 in between touring behind the band's first record Fever to Tell. The song "Down Boy" was No. 61 on Rolling Stone's list of the 100 Best Songs of 2007.

== Background ==
Written amidst a turbulent and emotionally unstable period in Yeah Yeah Yeahs' history, the angst that colored that time translates into a sexually charged body of songs. On their choice of producer, Karen O stated, "Nick Launay was the natural choice having produced PiL Flowers of Romance, collectively a favorite between us. I put that record on and want to stuff my mouth with raw hamburger meat."

The EP has been released on CD, double 7" vinyl, USB flash drive and digital download.

"Down Boy" was originally released as a split single with Liars only released in Australia and Japan. The album title is an extraction of the fourth track song Isis, which in turn is an extraction of the Egyptian goddess Isis.

== The video ==
The band made a live film to accompany the EP with co-directors K. K. Barrett and Lance Bangs. Recorded in night vision at Glasslands Gallery in Brooklyn on 7 May, the band played two sets that night to 100 fans each time—the first for a mixed audience and the second for females only. There will be two filmed versions of lead track "Down Boy"—one live, and one to EP audio.

Three of these live videos, and the EP audio version of "Down Boy", have been uploaded to their official YouTube channel.

== Track listing ==
All tracks are written by Yeah Yeah Yeahs.

No.	Title	Length
1.	"Rockers to Swallow"	3:14
2.	"Down Boy"	3:54
3.	"Kiss Kiss"	2:45
4.	"Isis"	4:00
5.	"10 x 10"	3:44
Total length:		17:47

== Personnel ==
- Brian Chase – drums
- Nick Zinner – guitars, synthesizer
- Karen O – vocals

== Charts ==
Chart (2007)	Peak position
Australia (ARIA)	38
Canadian Albums (Billboard)	44
Denmark (Tracklisten)	5
Italy (FIMI)	33
Mexican Albums (Top 100 Mexico)	63
US Billboard 200	72
