= Gold Lion =

2006 single by Yeah Yeah Yeahs

Single by Yeah Yeah Yeahs

from the album Show Your Bones
- Released: February 28, 2006
- Genre: Alternative rock; indie rock
- Length: 3:07
- Label: Interscope
- Songwriters: Brian Chase; Karen Orzolek; Nick Zinner
- Producers: David Andrew Sitek; Yeah Yeah Yeahs

Yeah Yeah Yeahs singles chronology
"Y Control" (2004)	"Gold Lion" (2006)	"Turn Into" (2006)

"Gold Lion" is a song by American indie rock band Yeah Yeah Yeahs from their second studio album, Show Your Bones (2006). It was written by the band and produced with David Andrew Sitek, and released by Interscope as the album's lead single in February 2006. "Gold Lion" is an alternative rock song that departs from the garage rock sound of their earlier works.

"Gold Lion" was praised by reviewers and won the BMI London Pop Award in 2007; it charted in five countries, reaching number 88 on the US Billboard Hot 100 and number 18 on the UK singles chart. The song's music video was directed by Patrick Daughters and nominated for a MVPA Award.

== Background ==
Yeah Yeah Yeahs began work on their second album, Show Your Bones, with the goal of reinventing their sound and not creating "Fever to Tell part 2". From early to late 2005, the band faced various problems during production, including scrapping and restarting the album, and tensions rising between lead singer and lyricist Karen O and guitarist Nick Zinner from the pressure. "Gold Lion", in particular, was conceived after Karen O performed on the Adidas commercial Hello Tomorrow in 2005 created by her then-boyfriend, Spike Jonze, and composed by Show Your Bones producer Squeak E. Clean. Drummer Brian Chase said that he did not understand the music until a month after they had finished recording.

== Composition ==
"Gold Lion" is characterized as an alternative rock and indie rock song with a length of three minutes and seven seconds. The title of the song derives from two awards received by Jonze at the 2005 Cannes Lions International Advertising Festival. The song is built around a drumbeat by Chase that resembles the one in "We Will Rock You" by British rock band Queen, along with acoustic guitar riffs played by Zinner, who uses a distortion pedal in the choruses.

== Reception ==
"Gold Lion" was well-received by critics and won the BMI London Pop Award in 2007. Some critics have noted the song's similarities to "No New Tale To Tell" by English rock band Love and Rockets and "Peek-a-Boo" by Siouxsie and the Banshees. Journalists at Spin and NME were pleasantly surprised at the song's melodic direction, which the latter publication deemed "preternaturally brilliant". In their reviews of Show Your Bones, writers for Rolling Stone and The Village Voice thought that "Gold Lion" represented the band at their most brass and "Beck-like", and AllMusic called it a cryptic earworm. A writer for Drowned in Sound was more critical, stating that Yeah Yeah Yeahs shouldn't have deviated from their previous formula.

== Music video ==
The music video for "Gold Lion" was directed by Patrick Daughters, who has directed many videos for the band. It features the band playing in the Nevada desert at sunset and eventually night. At first we see Brian holding a large pile of drumsticks with more tied to his back. Then, Nick is seen walking dragging a number of acoustic guitars behind him. Brian then sits at his drumkit with the pile of drumsticks. As he begins to play Brian's drumkit shoots out flames from his snare drum, which sets his drumstick alight and the ground around him as he continues to play. He then throws the stick on a pile of other drumsticks starting another fire. The rest of the band are seen performing, however they are all covered in sand and dust. At the pre-chorus Nick smashes his guitar on the ground, at the same time Karen wipes the dust off her face and takes off her sooty clothes to reveal her 'shiny' dress. Nick then plays the lead part on his electric guitar, the smashed guitar then sets on fire adding to the flames. The band continues playing in the same fashion with Nick smashing another acoustic guitar. The fire builds and the flames create a circle divided into 6ths surrounding the band. The video concludes with the band performing while surrounded by flames.

The music video was nominated for the MVPA Award for Cinematography in 2007.

== Other versions ==
- In 2010, the instrumentals of "Gold Lion" were sampled in a commercial for Apple's iPad device.
- In 2019, American folk rock band the Accidentals covered "Gold Lion" while performing live.

== Track listing ==
All songs are written by Yeah Yeah Yeahs.

US CD (B0006336-32)

1. "Gold Lion" – 3:07
2. "Let Me Know" (demo) – 3:31
3. "Gold Lion" (Diplo remix) – 4:04
4. "Gold Lion" (Nick Zinner remix) – 3:14

UK CD (987 735-1)

1. "Gold Lion" – 3:09
2. "Let Me Know" (demo) – 3:32
3. "Gold Lion" (Diplo remix) – 4:05

== Charts ==
Chart performance for "Gold Lion"
Chart (2006)	Peak position
Canadian Singles (Nielsen SoundScan)	2
Irish Singles (IRMA)	37
UK Singles (OCC)	18
UK Singles Downloads (OCC)	34
UK Physical Singles (OCC)	12
US Billboard Hot 100	88
US Alternative Airplay (Billboard)	14
