= It's Blitz! =

2009 studio album by Yeah Yeah Yeahs

Studio album by Yeah Yeah Yeahs
- Released: March 6, 2009
- Recorded: 2008
- Studios: Sonic Ranch (Tornillo, Texas); Long View Farm (North Brookfield, Massachusetts); Stay Gold (Brooklyn, New York); The Boat (Silver Lake, California); Seedy Underbelly (Valley Village, California)
- Genres: Synth-punk; alternative pop; synth-pop; pop rock
- Length: 41:49
- Labels: Dress Up; DGC; Interscope
- Producers: Nick Launay; David Andrew Sitek

Yeah Yeah Yeahs chronology
Is Is (2007)	It's Blitz! (2009)	iTunes Originals: Yeah Yeah Yeahs (2009)

Singles from It's Blitz!
- 1. "Zero" Released: February 24, 2009; 2. "Heads Will Roll" Released: June 29, 2009; 3. "Skeletons" Released: February 1, 2010

It's Blitz! is the third studio album by American indie rock band Yeah Yeah Yeahs, released on March 6, 2009 on Interscope Records. The album was produced by Nick Launay, who had worked with the band on their previous EP, Is Is (2007), and TV on the Radio's David Andrew Sitek, who had produced the band's debut album, Fever to Tell (2003). The album was supported by three singles, "Zero", "Heads Will Roll", and "Skeletons".

It's Blitz! received acclaim from music critics, and was nominated for Best Alternative Music Album at the 2010 Grammy Awards.

== Recording ==
"When Yeah Yeah Yeahs guitarist Nick Zinner packed his bag for the band's trip to the studio…" wrote John Doran in Classic Rock, "he made a random decision that would completely change their direction. The vintage ARP synthesizer that he carried with him to the Tornillo studios in the west Texan desert was supposed to provide downtime entertainment, but ended up being the defining noise on It's Blitz!."

According to coproducer Nick Launay, the album was unusual for being largely written and created in the studio at a time when record labels had cut back considerably on production budgets. The few songs the band took to the first sessions were altered significantly.

Launay described a typical session: "Brian [Chase] would play lots of different drumbeats and we'd record it, chop it up and then make a groove loop out of it. Nick [Zinner] would then just jam to it, and we'd come up with an interesting rhythm part. Karen [O] would listen to that and come up with a vocal melody and then suddenly everything would fall into place."

During the sessions – which took place over several months in 2008 – there were numerous breaks "to get inspired".

== Release ==
The album was originally planned to be released on April 14, 2009. However, the album was leaked to the Internet on February 22, causing it to be pushed forward to March 10 for the digital release and March 31 for the physical release.

== Critical reception ==
Professional ratings
Aggregate scores
Source	Rating
AnyDecentMusic?	8.2/10
Metacritic	82/100
Review scores
Source	Rating
AllMusic	4/5 stars
Classic Rock	8/10
The Daily Telegraph	4/5 stars
Entertainment Weekly	B+
The Guardian	4/5 stars
Los Angeles Times	3.5/4 stars
MSN Music (Consumer Guide)	A−
NME	8/10
Pitchfork	8.1/10
Rolling Stone	4/5 stars
Spin	9/10

It's Blitz! received universal acclaim from music critics. At Metacritic, which assigns a normalized rating out of 100 to reviews from mainstream publications, the album received an average score of 82 based on 36 reviews, indicating "universal acclaim". Heather Phares of AllMusic believed the band successfully departed from their established sound, writing that "between the violently happy songs and the softer ones, this is some of the Yeah Yeah Yeahs' most balanced and cohesive music." Jon Pareles of The New York Times wrote that the band "grapple with separation and need, using dance beats to suggest the compulsive pleasure seeking that tries to drown out loneliness", and he commended their musical direction, stating, "The band is echoing the evolution of postpunk, from dogmatic austerity to technologically assisted".

Blender also gave the album four stars out of five and hailed it as "the sound of a band reborn with new momentum, and on an album that requires dancing, the message is clear: It doesn't matter where you came from. Just keep moving." Clash commented that the trio had grown without distancing themselves from what made their name: "The album proves that they can provide epic music with personal themes, that YYYs can expand without losing what made us fall for them in the first place". The Guardian's Caroline Sullivan declared the "glittery new disco sound suits them very well. It's all cool, brittle catchiness, with a debt owed to Eat to the Beat-era Blondie". Emily Mackay of NME wrote, "It's Blitz!'s heartfelt love letter to the transcendent possibilities of the dancefloor is an unexpectedly emphatic reassertion of why Yeah Yeah Yeahs are one of the most exciting bands of this decade." Mojo awarded it four stars out of five and wrote that the band "managed to mix the human and the electronic, the emotional and the artsy, the fashion-forward and the oddly retro."

Spin's Charles Aaron called it "the alternative pop album of the decade – one that imbues The Killers' Hot Fuss and MGMT's Oracular Spectacular with a remarkable emotional depth and finesse". Uncut's April Long scored it four out of five and praised its "spirit of experimentation", stating "What unifies them is a warm romanticism that runs throughout, edging out Karen's blatant eroticism of yore – even though there are more come-downs than come-ons, every song seems to glow from within". Theon Weber of The Village Voice said Karen O "isn't revealed to us through the record's lyrics, which are as gnomic as ever, but through attitudes, tones, put-on sneers, and audible grins."

=== Rankings ===
Publication	Accolade	Rank	Ref.
1001 Albums You Must Hear Before You Die	1001 Albums You Must Hear Before You Die	—N/a	
The A.V. Club	The Top 25 Albums of 2009	20	
Billboard	Top 10 Albums of 2009	2	
Clash	Top 40 Albums of 2009	3	
Consequence of Sound	The Top 100 Albums of 2009	6	
Drowned in Sound	Top 50 Albums of 2009	3	
Entertainment Weekly	10 Best (and 5 Worst) Albums of 2009	Best Rock Album	
The Guardian	Albums of 2009	10	
Mojo	Top 50 Albums of 2009	10	
musicOMH	Top 50 Best Albums of 2009	6	
NME	50 Best Albums of 2009	3	
Paste	The 25 Best Albums of 2009	23	
Pitchfork	The Top 50 Albums of 2009	12	
PopMatters	The Best 60 Albums of 2009	11	
Q	50 Best Albums of 2009	3	
Rhapsody	The 25 Best Albums of 2009	12	
Rolling Stone	The 25 Best Albums of 2009	20	
Slant Magazine	The 25 Best Albums of 2009	2	
Spin	The 40 Best Albums of 2009	2	
Spin	125 Best Albums of the Past 25 Years	118	
Uncut	50 Best Albums of 2009	9	
The Village Voice	Pazz & Jop Critics' Poll: The Top 25 Albums of 2009	4	

== Commercial performance ==
It's Blitz! debuted at number 32 on the Billboard 200, selling 13,000 digital copies in its first week. Following its physical release, the album climbed to a new peak position of number 22 in its fourth week on the chart, selling 22,000 copies. As of October 2009, it had sold 184,000 copies in United States, according to Nielsen SoundScan. The album entered the UK Albums Chart at number nine with first-week sales of 18,054 copies.

== Track listing ==
All tracks are written by Yeah Yeah Yeahs.

No.	Title	Length
1.	"Zero"	4:25
2.	"Heads Will Roll"	3:41
3.	"Soft Shock"	3:53
4.	"Skeletons"	5:02
5.	"Dull Life"	4:08
6.	"Shame and Fortune"	3:31
7.	"Runaway"	5:13
8.	"Dragon Queen"	4:02
9.	"Hysteric"	3:50
10.	"Little Shadow"	3:57

Deluxe edition bonus tracks
No.	Title	Length
11.	"Soft Shock" (acoustic)	3:25
12.	"Skeletons" (acoustic)	3:29
13.	"Hysteric" (acoustic)	3:51
14.	"Little Shadow" (acoustic)	2:53

iTunes Store bonus tracks
No.	Title	Length
11.	"Faces"	3:33
12.	"Clap Song" (pre-order only)	3:26

Japanese edition bonus tracks
No.	Title	Length
11.	"Hysteric" (acoustic)	3:51
12.	"Soft Shock" (acoustic)	3:25
13.	"Little Shadow" (acoustic)	2:53
14.	"Skeletons" (acoustic)	3:29
15.	"Faces"	3:33

== Personnel ==
Credits adapted from the liner notes of It's Blitz!

Yeah Yeah Yeahs

- Brian Chase – drums, cymbals, percussion
- Karen O – vocals
- Nick Zinner – guitars, keyboards, drum machine, bass

Additional musicians

- Stuart Bogie – tenor saxophone (tracks 1, 8, 9); baritone saxophone (tracks 8, 9)
- Eric Biondo – trumpet (tracks 1, 9)
- Greg Kurstin – piano (track 7)
- Jane Scarpantoni – cello (track 7)
- Tunde Adebimpe – vocals (track 8)
- Imaad Wasif – guitar (track 10)

Technical

- Nick Launay – production, recording
- David Andrew Sitek – production (tracks 1–4, 8, 9); additional production (tracks 5); recording (all tracks)
- Dan Huron – recording
- Aaron Dembe – engineering assistance
- Alyssa Pittaluga – engineering assistance
- Atom – engineering assistance
- Charles Godfrey – engineering assistance
- Chris Coady – engineering assistance
- Chris Moore – engineering assistance
- Justin Leeah – engineering assistance
- Mike Laza – engineering assistance
- Spike Stent – mixing at Chalice Recording Studios (Los Angeles, California)
- Matty Green – mixing assistance
- Chris Kasych – mixing assistance
- Ted Jensen – mastering at Sterling Sound (New York City)

Artwork

- Karen O – art direction
- Seb Marling – art direction
- Urs Fischer – art direction, cover photography, inside photography
- Autumn de Wilde – live photography (band)
- David Belisle – live photography (Karen and Brian)
- Eric Uhlir – live photography (Nick)

== Charts ==
=== Weekly charts ===
Weekly chart performance for It's Blitz!
Chart (2009)	Peak position
Australian Albums (ARIA)	8
Austrian Albums (Ö3 Austria)	61
Belgian Albums (Ultratop Flanders)	23
Belgian Albums (Ultratop Wallonia)	83
Canadian Albums (Billboard)	18
Danish Albums (Hitlisten)	40
European Albums (Billboard)	32
French Albums (SNEP)	160
German Albums (Offizielle Top 100)	71
Irish Albums (IRMA)	10
Italian Albums (FIMI)	91
Japan Album Sales (Billboard Japan)	90
Japanese Albums (Oricon)	62
Mexican Albums (Top 100 Mexico)	56
New Zealand Albums (RMNZ)	22
Norwegian Albums (VG-lista)	12
Scottish Albums (Official Charts)	11
Swiss Albums (Schweizer Hitparade)	85
UK Albums (Official Charts)	9
US Billboard 200	22
US Top Alternative Albums (Billboard)	4
US Top Rock Albums (Billboard)	5

=== Year-end charts ===
Year-end chart performance for It's Blitz!
Chart (2009)	Position
UK Albums (OCC)	164
US Billboard 200	192
US Top Alternative Albums (Billboard)	43

== Certifications ==
Certifications for It's Blitz!
Region	Certification	Certified units/sales
Australia (ARIA)	Gold	35,000^{^}
New Zealand (RMNZ)	Gold	7,500^{‡}
United Kingdom (BPI)	Gold	100,000^{*}
United States (RIAA)	Gold	500,000^{‡}
^{*} Sales figures based on certification alone.^{^} Shipments figures based on certification alone.^{‡} Sales+streaming figures based on certification alone.

== Release history ==
Release dates and formats for It's Blitz!
Region	Date	Format	Edition	Label	Ref(s)
Australia	March 6, 2009	Digital download	Standard	Universal	
United Kingdom	March 9, 2009	Digital download	Standard; deluxe	Polydor	
United States	March 10, 2009	Digital download	Standard; deluxe	Dress Up; DGC; Interscope	
Germany	March 13, 2009	Digital download	Standard	Universal	
United States	March 31, 2009	CD	Standard; deluxe	Dress Up; DGC; Interscope	
Australia	April 3, 2009	CD	Standard; deluxe	Universal	
Australia	April 3, 2009	Digital download	Deluxe	Universal	
Germany	April 3, 2009	CD	Standard; deluxe	Universal	
Germany	April 3, 2009	LP	Standard	Universal	
Germany	April 3, 2009	Digital download	Deluxe	Universal	
United Kingdom	April 6, 2009	CD	Standard; deluxe	Polydor	
United Kingdom	April 6, 2009	LP	Standard	Polydor	
United States	April 14, 2009	LP	Standard	Dress Up; DGC; Interscope	
Japan	April 15, 2009	CD; digital download	Japan standard	Universal	
