= Mosquito (album) =

Studio album by Yeah Yeah Yeahs
- Released: April 12, 2013
- Studios: Sonic Ranch (Tornillo, Texas); Stratosphere Sound (New York City); DFA (New York City); Squeak E. Clean (Echo Park, California); The Square (London)
- Genres: Art rock; art punk
- Length: 47:31
- Labels: Dress Up; Interscope
- Producers: Nick Launay; James Murphy; David Andrew Sitek; Sam Spiegel

Yeah Yeah Yeahs chronology
iTunes Originals: Yeah Yeah Yeahs (2009)	Mosquito (2013)	Cool It Down (2022)

Singles from Mosquito
- 1. "Sacrilege" Released: February 26, 2013; 2. "Despair" Released: July 19, 2013

Mosquito is the fourth studio album by American indie rock band Yeah Yeah Yeahs, released in April 2013, by Interscope Records. The lead single "Sacrilege" was released on February 26, 2013. "Despair" was released as the second single on July 19, 2013.

Karen O described the album as "extremely lo-fi", explaining: "We had a shitty drum machine, a shitty sampled keyboard, tons of delay on the vocals. There's a real tone, character, and style to it."

== Background ==
=== Album cover ===
The album cover for Mosquito was created by the South Korean-born animator Beomsik Shimbe Shim, also known as Shimbe. It depicts a spike-haired baby being attacked by a blood-sucking mosquito. Shimbe and Karen O were inspired by the surreal landscapes of Alice in Wonderland and children's illustrators of the 1970s and 1980s. Explaining the cover, Shimbe said in an interview:

"In [a] surreal way, the mosquito's blood sac is glowing through a blazing backlight and throws the bloody caustic effect on the naked boy. Since Karen O wanted the mosquito as a female while the victim is a boy, I considered the mosquito as Karen herself–the female warrior like a rock star. The boy could be anything the Yeah Yeah Yeahs want."

Reception towards the cover was polarizing, receiving comparisons to the Garbage Pail Kids; fan reception was negative. The Guardian's Sean Michaels said: "At best, it's phantasmagoric. At worst, it feels like a computer-generated tribute to Karen O's favourite film, The Garbage Pail Kids Movie [1987]." Shimbe admitted being surprised by the backlash at first, before receiving an email from Karen O that said: "We don't have fans because we do what they want us to do, we have fans because we do whatever we want and that's really what they want the most." The cover later appeared on Rolling Stone's list of the 50 worst album covers of all time, at number 45, in 2024.

== Release ==
The full album was posted on Noisey's YouTube page featuring a track-by-track interview with the band on April 2, 2013. On April 5, the band appeared on Late Show with David Letterman to perform "Sacrilege" accompanied by the gospel choir Broadway Inspirational Voices. Yeah Yeah Yeahs performed the songs "Mosquito" and "Sacrilege" on Jimmy Kimmel Live! on April 15.

A music video for the title track, directed by B. Shimbe Shim, debuted on May 8, 2013. The video for the second single "Despair" was directed by Patrick Daughters and premiered on June 21.

== Reception ==
Professional ratings
Aggregate scores
Source	Rating
AnyDecentMusic?	7.1/10
Metacritic	75/100
Review scores
Source	Rating
AllMusic	3.5/5 stars
The A.V. Club	B+
Entertainment Weekly	B−
The Guardian	4/5 stars
The Independent on Sunday	4/5 stars
NME	7/10
Pitchfork	6.0/10
Rolling Stone	3.5/5 stars
Slant Magazine	3/5 stars
Spin	8/10

=== Critical response ===
Mosquito received generally positive reviews from music critics. At Metacritic, which assigns a normalized rating out of 100 to reviews from mainstream publications, the album received an average score of 75, based on 39 reviews, which indicates "generally favorable reviews".

Mosquito was ranked number 30 on NME's "50 Best Albums of 2013" list and number 40 on Vice's "Top 50 Albums of 2013" list.

=== Commercial performance ===
Mosquito entered the Billboard 200 at number five with 38,000 copies sold in its first week, earning the band their first top-10 album on the chart. The album debuted at number nine on the UK Albums Chart with first-week sales of 9,150 copies, becoming the band's third consecutive top-10 album.

== Track listing ==
All tracks are written by Yeah Yeah Yeahs.

Mosquito track listing
No.	Title	Producer(s)	Length
1.	"Sacrilege"	Nick Launay; David Andrew Sitek	3:50
2.	"Subway"	Sitek; Launay	5:16
3.	"Mosquito"	Launay; Sitek	2:59
4.	"Under the Earth"	Launay	4:18
5.	"Slave"	Launay; Sitek	4:06
6.	"These Paths"	Sitek; Launay	5:03
7.	"Area 52"	Launay; Sitek	2:54
8.	"Buried Alive" (featuring Dr. Octagon)	James Murphy; Sam Spiegel	5:16
9.	"Always"	Sitek; Launay	4:06
10.	"Despair"	Sitek; Launay	4:49
11.	"Wedding Song"	Sitek	4:54
Total length:			47:31

Deluxe edition and Japanese edition bonus tracks
No.	Title	Producer(s)	Length
12.	"Subway" (NOLA demo)	Yeah Yeah Yeahs	3:54
13.	"Wedding Song" (acoustic)	Yeah Yeah Yeahs	2:53
14.	"Despair" (acoustic)	Yeah Yeah Yeahs	5:00
15.	"Mosquito" (live from Area 52)	Yeah Yeah Yeahs	3:24
Total length:			62:42

== Personnel ==
Credits adapted from the liner notes of the deluxe edition of Mosquito.

=== Yeah Yeah Yeahs ===
- Brian Chase – drums, cymbals, percussion, vocals
- Karen O – vocals, bass, keyboards
- Nick Zinner – guitars, bass, keyboards, vocals

=== Additional musicians ===
- David Andrew Sitek – bass (tracks 1, 3, 5)
- Money Mark – keyboards (track 1)
- Dr. Octagon – vocals (track 8)
- Debra Barsha – choir vocal arrangement (tracks 1, 4)
- Michael McElroy – choir leader (tracks 1, 4)
- Danielle Chambers – choir (track 1)
- Shayna Cook – choir (track 1)
- Bradley Dean – choir (tracks 1, 4)
- Laura Dean – choir (tracks 1, 4)
- Tanesha Gray – choir (track 1)
- Lucia Giannetta – choir (track 1)
- Renee Goldsberry – choir (tracks 1, 4)
- Danielle L. Greaves – choir (tracks 1, 4)
- Marva Hicks – choir (track 1)
- Zonya Johnson – choir (tracks 1, 4)
- Chelsea Krombach – choir (tracks 1, 4)
- Adriane Lenox – choir (track 1)
- Lisa Lynne Mathis – choir (track 1)
- Travis Morin – choir (track 1)
- Jesse Nager – choir (tracks 1, 4)
- John Eric Parker – choir (track 1)
- Desiree Rodriguez – choir (tracks 1, 4)
- Eliseo Roman – choir (tracks 1, 4)
- Michael Seelbach – choir (track 1)
- Virginia Woodruff – choir (track 1)

=== Technical ===
- Nick Launay – production (tracks 1–7, 9, 10); recording, engineering
- David Andrew Sitek – production (tracks 1–3, 5–7, 9–11); recording, engineering
- James Murphy – production (track 8); recording, engineering
- Sam Spiegel – production (track 8); recording, engineering
- Yeah Yeah Yeahs – production (tracks 12–15)
- Nick Zinner – mixing (tracks 12, 14, 15)
- Wes Fontenot – mixing, engineering (track 12)
- Manuel Calderon – engineering (track 13); engineering assistance
- Abby Echiverri – mixing (track 14); engineering (track 14, 15)
- Zeph Sowers – recording, engineering
- Atom – engineering assistance
- Rudyard Lee Cullers – engineering assistance
- Nathan Eldridge – engineering assistance
- Matt Foster – engineering assistance
- Charles Godfrey – engineering assistance
- Matt Thornley – engineering assistance
- Craig Silvey – mixing
- Eduardo de la Paz – mixing assistance
- Greg Calbi – mastering

=== Artwork ===
- Beomsik Shimbe Shim – art
- Julian Gross – design, layout
- Karen O – concept
- Dan Martensen – back cover photo

== Charts ==
Chart performance for Mosquito
Chart (2013)	Peak position
Australian Albums (ARIA)	17
Austrian Albums (Ö3 Austria)	44
Belgian Albums (Ultratop Flanders)	57
Belgian Albums (Ultratop Wallonia)	120
Canadian Albums (Billboard)	10
Croatian Albums (HDU)	23
French Albums (SNEP)	128
German Albums (Offizielle Top 100)	63
Greek Albums (IFPI)	27
Irish Albums (IRMA)	8
Japanese Albums (Oricon)	54
Mexican Albums (Top 100 Mexico)	66
Norwegian Albums (VG-lista)	24
Scottish Albums (Official Charts)	8
South Korean Albums (Gaon)	88
Swiss Albums (Schweizer Hitparade)	76
UK Albums (Official Charts)	9
US Billboard 200	5
US Top Alternative Albums (Billboard)	2
US Top Rock Albums (Billboard)	2

== Release history ==
Release dates and formats for Mosquito
Region	Date	Format	Edition	Label	Ref(s)
Australia	April 12, 2013	CD; digital download	Standard; deluxe	Modular	
Germany	April 12, 2013	CD; digital download	Standard; deluxe	Universal	
Germany	April 12, 2013	LP	Standard	Universal	
United Kingdom	April 15, 2013	CD; digital download	Standard; deluxe	Polydor	
United Kingdom	April 15, 2013	LP	Standard	Polydor	
United States	April 16, 2013	CD; digital download	Standard; deluxe	Dress Up; Interscope	
United States	April 16, 2013	LP	Standard	Dress Up; Interscope	
Canada	April 16, 2013	CD; digital download	Deluxe	Universal	
Canada	April 16, 2013	LP; digital download	Standard	Universal	
Japan	April 17, 2013	CD	Standard	Universal	
Japan	April 17, 2013	Digital download	Standard; deluxe	Universal	
