= Zero (Yeah Yeah Yeahs song) =

Single by Yeah Yeah Yeahs

from the album It's Blitz!
- Released: February 24, 2009
- Genre: Electropop; synth-pop; new wave; electro-disco
- Length: 4:25
- Label: Dress Up; DGC; Interscope
- Songwriter: Yeah Yeah Yeahs
- Producers: Nick Launay; David Andrew Sitek

Yeah Yeah Yeahs singles chronology
"Down Boy" (2007)	"Zero" (2009)	"Heads Will Roll" (2009)

Music video
- "Zero" on YouTube

"Zero" is a song by American indie rock band Yeah Yeah Yeahs, released as the lead single from their third studio album, It's Blitz! (2009). The song received critical acclaim from music critics for its production, and was named the best track of 2009 by both NME and Spin magazines.

The single had moderate commercial success, peaking at numbers four, 18 and 37 on the Billboard Hot Dance Singles Sales, Alternative Songs and Hot Rock Songs charts, respectively, as well as number 49 on the UK Singles Chart. A music video for the single, which shows lead singer Karen O walking the streets of San Francisco at night, was released in March 2009.

== Background ==
Singer Karen O said, "We want to shake the unshakable, to stir things up, and that’s a lot of the spirit of ‘Zero’; it's like” ‘Come on man! Come on! Just feel something, escape, whatever, whatever the emotion is just feel it!’"

== Critical reception ==
"Zero" received acclaim from music critics. Paula Carino of AllMusic described the song as "an exhilarating and wide-open expanse of pure electro-pop". Mary Bellamy of Drowned in Sound viewed the track as "the call to arms of a band who desperately want to teleport the refugees of fashion-fizzled pop, the hippest of hipsters and the weirdest outsiders to the dancefloor of their sweaty spaceship", stating it is "perhaps one of the band's finest moments ever committed to tape."

Slant Magazine's Jonathan Keefe praised "Zero" as "flat-out phenomenal", while Alex Fletcher of Digital Spy called it "a saucy electro romp that makes even GaGa seem a tad coy". Michael Hubbard of musicOMH dubbed the song "an all out visceral onslaught, a keening mix of battered synths, drum machines and Nick Zinner's typically bloodless guitar playing", and referred to it as "a mix of Show Your Bones' cleaner production with the grubbiness of the Is Is EP". Evan Sawdey of PopMatters opined that "[n]o YYY's song has ever been as disposable, replayable, or just outright fun as 'Zero'".

"Zero" was named the best track of 2009 by both the NME and Spin magazines, while Pitchfork ranked it the sixth best song of the year. In October 2011, the NME placed the song at number 39 on its list of the "150 Best Tracks of the Past 15 Years". Writing in retrospect, Alexis Petridis of The Guardian cited "Zero" as proof of the band's difficulties at achieving commercial success, stating the song "sounded like a mammoth hit right up to the point it stalled at No. 49 in the singles chart."

== Music video ==
The music video for "Zero" was directed by Barney Clay and premiered on March 9, 2009. It was filmed in the San Francisco neighborhoods of Tenderloin, North Beach, and Chinatown. Speaking to Spinner, lead singer Karen O explained the concept of the video: "The visuals had to be well paced with the slow ecstatic build of the song. It made sense that the visuals would take you on a journey and keep you on the move—no sitting still for too long in the city landscape of bright lights, dark alleys and glittering streets. 'Zero''s sentiment is to revel in being you—you're a zero so screw it! It's the underdogs, the rebels, the outsiders that have always captivated me growing up so I decided why not flaunt that side of myself in the video."

The video opens with the band in the dressing room of The Warfield, getting ready for a show, at which point O walks through a curtain that takes her to the streets of San Francisco at night. Clad in a PVC dress and a studded leather jacket, O is seen walking around the streets and dancing atop cars. She soon joins her bandmates again as they perform the song in an alleyway. Towards the end of the video, the band play around with shopping carts in the Transbay Terminal, before playing in a local discount store.

== Use in media ==
"Zero" was used in the television shows 90210, Ugly Betty, Gossip Girl, and The L.A. Complex. The song was also included in the soundtrack for the 2009 video game Tony Hawk: Ride.

== Track listings ==
- US and UK CD single
1. "Zero" – 4:25
2. "Zero" (MSTRKRFT Remix) – 4:00
- UK 7-inch single #1

A. "Zero" – 4:25
B. "Zero" (Animal Collective Remix) – 4:27

- UK 7-inch single #2

A. "Zero" – 4:25
B. "Zero" (Erol Alkan Rework) – 5:58

- UK iTunes EP
1. "Zero" – 4:29
2. "Zero" (MSTRKRFT Remix) – 4:02
3. "Zero" (Animal Collective Remix) – 4:29
4. "Zero" (Erol Alkan Rework) – 6:00
- US iTunes EP – Remixes
1. "Zero" – 4:25
2. "Zero" (N.A.S.A. Bloody Lobo Remix) – 5:32
3. "Zero" (Erol Alkan Rework) – 4:01
4. "Zero" (Animal Collective Remix) – 4:27
- US 12-inch single – Remixes

A1. "Zero" (Album Version) – 4:26
A2. "Zero" (N.A.S.A. Bloody Lobo Remix) – 5:32
A3. "Zero" (MSTRKRFT Remix) – 4:00
B1. "Zero" (Erol Alkan Rework) – 5:58
B2. "Zero" (Animal Collective Remix) – 4:27

== Credits and personnel ==
Credits adapted from the liner notes of It's Blitz!

- Nick Launay – production, recording
- David Andrew Sitek – production, recording
- Stuart Bogie – tenor saxophone
- Eric Biondo – trumpet
- Dan Huron – recording
- Mark "Spike" Stent – mixing
- Matty Green – mixing assistance
- Ted Jensen – mastering

== Charts ==
Chart (2009)	Peak position
Australia (ARIA)	88
Australia Dance (ARIA)	10
Scotland Singles (OCC)	6
UK Singles (OCC)	49
US Hot Singles Sales (Billboard)	7
US Alternative Airplay (Billboard)	18
US Hot Dance Singles Sales (Billboard)	4
US Hot Rock & Alternative Songs (Billboard)	37

== Release history ==
Region	Date	Format	Label	Ref.
United States	February 24, 2009	Digital download (via pre-order of It's Blitz! on iTunes)	Dress Up; DGC; Interscope	
United States	February 24, 2009	Modern rock radio	Dress Up; DGC; Interscope	
United States	March 17, 2009	CD single	Dress Up; DGC; Interscope	
United Kingdom	April 7, 2009	7-inch single	Polydor	
United Kingdom	April 12, 2009	Digital EP	Polydor	
United Kingdom	April 13, 2009	CD single	Polydor	
United States	May 19, 2009	Digital EP – Remixes	Dress Up; DGC; Interscope	
United States	June 9, 2009	12-inch single	Dress Up; DGC; Interscope	
