= Cheated Hearts =

Single by Yeah Yeah Yeahs

from the album Show Your Bones
- Released: September 4, 2006
- Genre: Alternative rock; indie rock
- Length: 3:58
- Label: Polydor
- Songwriters: Brian Chase; Karen Orzolek; Nick Zinner

Yeah Yeah Yeahs singles chronology
"Turn Into" (2006)	"Cheated Hearts" (2006)	"Down Boy" (2007)

Music video
- "Cheated Hearts" on YouTube

"Cheated Hearts" is a song by American indie rock band Yeah Yeah Yeahs from their second studio album, Show Your Bones (2006). The song first featured on the band's music DVD, Tell Me What Rockers to Swallow (2004), and was released as a single by Polydor in September 2006.

== Composition ==
"Cheated Hearts" is an alternative rock and indie rock song with a length of three minutes and 58 seconds, while a radio edit is shortened to three minutes and 34 seconds. According to sheet music published by Hal Leonard and Chrysalis Music, the song is written in the key of A major.

== Release and reception ==
"Cheated Hearts" was released on September 4, 2006 through Polydor Records, first on a limited-edition heart shaped vinyl. Although the song did not make any commercial impact, it received critical acclaim. Drowned in Sound's Sean Adams called it "one of the greatest moments in living blurred indie-memory", praising Karen O's vocals and Nick Zinner's guitar work. The Skinny's Tali Burgess described it as an "energetic, melancholic wonder" and a spiritual sequel to their 2003 single, "Maps".

Josh Tyrangiel from Time magazine titled "Cheated Hearts" as the second best song of 2006, calling it "joyous" and "volatile". NME, BBC Radio 6, and Pitchfork also placed it on their year-end lists, while the latter publication rated it among the decade's 500 best songs.

== Music video ==
The music video for "Cheated Hearts", directed by Karen O under the moniker Marshmellow, is composed of clips submitted by fans who look alike to the band. She described it as "the most amazing way to connect with our fans. They really rose to the occasion."

== Track listing ==
All tracks are written by Yeah Yeah Yeahs.

Digital release
No.	Title	Length
1.	"Cheated Hearts (radio edit)"	3:34
2.	"Thank You Were Wrong"	6:10
