= MVPA Awards =

American music award

- Awarded for: Music video production and post-production
- Country: United States
- First award: 1992
- Final award: 2020
- Website: mvpa.com

The MVPA Awards are held by the Music Video Production Association, the trade organization for the American music video industry, since 1992. MVPA Awards honor the best music videos in a variety of aspects, which includes music video production and post-production companies, as well as individuals – directors, producers, cinematographers, choreographers, stylists, production designers, editors, colorists, animators and others.
