= Cool It Down =

Studio album by Yeah Yeah Yeahs
- Released: September 30, 2022
- Length: 32:24
- Label: Secretly Canadian
- Producer: Dave Sitek; Justin Raisen; Andrew Wyatt

Yeah Yeah Yeahs chronology
Mosquito (2013)	Cool It Down (2022)

Singles from Cool It Down
- 1. "Spitting Off the Edge of the World" Released: June 1, 2022; 2. "Burning" Released: August 10, 2022; 3. "Wolf" Released: October 31, 2022

Cool It Down is the fifth studio album by American indie rock band Yeah Yeah Yeahs, released on September 30, 2022, through Secretly Canadian. It marks the group's first album since 2013's Mosquito and their first release through Secretly Canadian. The lead single "Spitting Off the Edge of the World" featuring Perfume Genius was released on June 1, 2022. The band began a world tour in support of the record from June 2022.

Cool It Down received acclaim from music critics and was nominated for Best Alternative Music Album at the 65th Annual Grammy Awards.

== Background ==
In a press release, Karen O stated: "Don't have to tell you how much we've been going through in the last nine years since our last record, because you've been going through it too [...] So yes we've taken our time, happy to report when it's ready it really does just flow out." The title of the album was taken from the Velvet Underground song of the same name from their 1970 album Loaded, while lead single "Spitting Off the Edge of the World" was inspired by the climate crisis. "Fleez," the album's fourth track, incorporates elements from fellow New York City band ESG's 1981 song "Moody".

Yeah Yeah Yeahs first teased new music in early May 2022 after announcing shows in New York City and Los Angeles in October.

== Critical reception ==
Professional ratings
Aggregate scores
Source	Rating
AnyDecentMusic?	7.9/10
Metacritic	82/100
Review scores
Source	Rating
AllMusic	4/5 stars
Beats per Minute	88%
Clash	8/10
DIY	5/5 stars
Exclaim!	7/10
The Independent	3/5 stars
NME	4/5 stars
Pitchfork	7.4/10
The Skinny	3/5 stars
Slant Magazine	4/5 stars

Cool It Down was acclaimed by critics upon its release. At Metacritic, which assigns a normalized rating out of 100 to reviews from mainstream publications, the album received an average score of 82, based on 25 reviews. Review aggregator AnyDecentMusic? assess the critical consensus as a 7.9 out of 10.

Reviewing the album for AllMusic, Heather Phares wrote that "For a band who seemed so impulsive at the outset, Yeah Yeah Yeahs' reflection and deliberation has been a surprising strength that's only grown with time. They may never lose all their restlessness -- nor should they -- but it's undeniable that Cool It Down is one of their most consistent albums." Writing for NME, Erica Campbell declared that, "Despite its acute focus on the current bleak state of things, the album shines a light on a brighter and divergent future; not just for the world, but for a band who continues to evolve among critiques that their past is the best part of them."

Phillipe Roberts was more reserved in praising the album for Pitchfork, claiming that; "Yeah Yeah Yeahs spend some of Cool It Down's sharpest moments citing and deconstructing their influences with refreshing candor. ... But every now and then, [Karen O's] reliable lyrical workhorse hits a brick wall."

== Track listing ==
Cool It Down track listing
No.	Title	Writer(s)	Producer	Length
1.	"Spitting Off the Edge of the World" (featuring Perfume Genius)	Karen Orzolek; Nick Zinner; Brian Chase; David Andrew Sitek	David Andrew Sitek	4:17
2.	"Lovebomb"	Orzolek; Zinner; Sitek	David Andrew Sitek	5:06
3.	"Wolf"	Orzolek; Zinner; Sitek	David Andrew Sitek	4:13
4.	"Fleez"	Orzolek; Zinner; Chase; Renee Scroggins	Justin Raisen	3:58
5.	"Burning"	Orzolek; Zinner; Chase; Bob Gaudio; Peggy Farina	Andrew Wyatt	4:05
6.	"Blacktop"	Orzolek; Zinner; Sitek	David Andrew Sitek	4:23
7.	"Different Today"	Orzolek; Zinner	Wyatt	4:27
8.	"Mars"	Orzolek; Zinner; Raisen	Raisen	1:55
Total length:				32:24

== Personnel ==
Yeah Yeah Yeahs

- Karen O – vocals, synthesizer
- Nick Zinner – guitar, synthesizer
- Brian Chase – drums, cymbals, percussion

Additional musicians

- Perfume Genius – vocals (1)
- Anthony Paul Lopez – percussion (4)
- Justin Raisen – sound effects (4)
- Mark Nishita – synthesizer (4, 8)
- Stephen Hussey – orchestra leader (5)
- Urban Soul – strings (5, 7)

Technical

- Greg Calbi – mastering
- Steve Fallone – mastering
- Shawn Everett – mixing
- Derek Coburn – engineering (1–3, 6)
- Mario Ramirez – engineering (1–3, 6)
- Justin Raisen – engineering (4, 8)
- Anthony Paul Lopez – engineering (4, 8)
- Ainjel Emme – engineering (4)
- Adam Noble – engineering (5, 7)
- Andrew Wyatt – engineering (5, 7)
- Jens Jungkurth – engineering (5, 7)
- Tim O'Sullivan – engineering (5, 7)
- Will Purton – engineering (5, 7)

== Charts ==
Chart performance for Cool It Down
Chart (2022)	Peak position
Australian Albums (ARIA)	19
Belgian Albums (Ultratop Flanders)	123
German Albums (Offizielle Top 100)	29
Irish Albums (IRMA)	80
New Zealand Albums (RMNZ)	24
Scottish Albums (OCC)	6
Swiss Albums (Schweizer Hitparade)	41
UK Albums (OCC)	10
UK Independent Albums (OCC)	2
US Billboard 200	45
US Independent Albums (Billboard)	6
US Top Rock Albums (Billboard)	6

== In other media ==
- The song "Spitting Off The Edge Of The World" was used in the videogame FIFA 23 and also as part of the soundtrack to the 2025 film, The Gorge.
- The fifth track, "Burning," was used in the trailer for the 2023 DreamWorks Animation film, Ruby Gillman, Teenage Kraken, before being used in the film itself. It was also used in the Marvel Cinematic Universe miniseries, Echo, as its opening theme, and in the Dead Boy Detectives episode "The Case of the Very Long Stairway".
