= Show Your Bones =

Studio album by Yeah Yeah Yeahs
- Released: March 28, 2006
- Recorded: July–August 2005
- Studios: Stay Gold (Brooklyn, New York City)
- Genres: Indie rock; alternative rock; garage punk
- Length: 38:51
- Labels: Dress Up; Interscope
- Producers: Squeak E. Clean; David Andrew Sitek; Yeah Yeah Yeahs

Yeah Yeah Yeahs chronology
Fever to Tell (2003)	Show Your Bones (2006)	Is Is (2007)

Singles from Show Your Bones
- 1. "Gold Lion" Released: February 28, 2006; 2. "Turn Into" Released: June 19, 2006; 3. "Cheated Hearts" Released: September 11, 2006

Show Your Bones is the second studio album by American indie rock band Yeah Yeah Yeahs, released on March 28, 2006 in the US and a day earlier in the UK by Interscope Records. Produced by Squeak E. Clean and the band itself, with additional production from David Andrew Sitek, the album was recorded between July–August 2005 at Stay Gold in Brooklyn, New York City.

Supported by the singles, "Gold Lion", "Turn Into" and "Cheated Hearts", the album was nominated for a Grammy Award for Best Alternative Music Album in 2007.

== Background and music ==
In early 2005, the band decided to scrap all of the songs they had written for the record so far and re-invent their style. Karen O said, "We're not interested in making Fever to Tell Part 2. The pressure is to re-invent ourselves. We don't know how we're going to do it yet but I think it's in our best interests to try and explore other directions." Guitarist Nick Zinner added, "It seems like a necessary step and the obvious thing to do is not repeat what you've played. I was disappointed by a lot of band's second records recently over the past year or two because it sounded like B-sides from the first record."

In an interview with Blender magazine, the band said during the writing and recording that they had almost broken up, calling that time one of their "darkest" moments.

In December 2005, producer Squeak E. Clean told MTV News that the band's second album would be a concept album about lead singer Karen O's cat, to be titled Coco Beware, but this turned out to be untrue.

Spin described the sound on the album as a "more melodic" alternative rock, recalling Pixies, Belly and Siouxsie Sioux.

== Recording ==
Show Your Bones was written by the group members in the first half of 2005 in Los Angeles, while the recording took place from July to August of 2005 in Dave Sitek's Stay Gold Studios located in Williamsburg, Brooklyn. Apart from Sitek, Squeak E. Clean, the brother of Karen O's boyfriend, participated in the recording. The band made considerable efforts to renew their approach to the creation of music and to distance themselves from the concept of the first studio album. According to Jim Allen of Diffuser, throughout the work on Show Your Bones, the group turned the studio sessions into a part of the creative process rather than using the studio merely as a place to capture "audio vérité arrangements".

Karen O shared that the recording "was definitely a difficult thing", adding that "with ‘Fever To Tell’ we were writing songs and then immediately playing in front of audiences and getting feedback and really developing them in front of other people. This time it was like a pressure cooker, totally cut off from any sort of influence. It was very terrifying, but it was actually really rewarding because it was doing something different for us". The vocalist also explained the meaning behind the album title: "'Show Your Bones' is what happens when you put your finger in a light socket."

Drummer Brian Chase recalled about the album that it took him some time after finishing the recording to understand "what these songs were and where they came from", describing them as "cutting edge and new, even for me as they were being recorded." He explained that "there was a lot of thought, tension and emotion, but we’ve stretched our boundaries of what we were comfortable with and what we’ve done before."

== Critical reception ==
Professional ratings
Aggregate scores
Source	Rating
Metacritic	79/100
Review scores
Source	Rating
AllMusic	3/5 stars
The A.V. Club	B+
Entertainment Weekly	A−
The Guardian	2/5 stars
Los Angeles Times	3.5/4 stars
NME	8/10
Pitchfork	6.8/10
Q	4/5 stars
Rolling Stone	4/5 stars
Uncut	4/5 stars

Show Your Bones received generally positive reviews from music critics. At Metacritic, which assigns a weighted mean rating out of 100 to reviews from mainstream critics, the album received an average score of 79, based on 35 reviews, which indicates "generally favorable reviews".

Most reviews were positive: E! Online gave the album an A− and said, "The group cuts through style in pursuit of substance, using Fever to Tell's slow-burning hit 'Maps' as a jump-off point." The Village Voice gave it a positive review and said it wasn't "the Yeahs' Room on Fire. Far from it." Los Angeles Times gave the album three-and-a-half stars out of four and called it "minimalist rock with real feeling and a subversive, epic range." The A.V. Club gave it a B+ and said, "As before, the band's willingness to ground itself in human emotion sets it apart." Playlouder gave it a score of four stars out of five and said: "If 'Fever To Tell' was a scratchy post punk effort, then this is their gothic record." Alternative Press also gave it four stars out of five and called it "the sort of second album that, rather than being a sophomore slump, makes you anxiously wonder what albums three, four and five will sound like." musicOMH likewise gave the album four stars out of five and called it "the sound of a band irretrievably, irresistibly and deservedly hurtling towards the big time." BBC Collective likewise gave it four stars out of five and simply said: "Short answer: it's good."

Yahoo! Music UK gave it a score of seven stars out of ten and called it "flawed, but applause for adding vulnerability to [the band's] game plan, at the very least." Under the Radar also gave it seven stars out of ten and called it "a bit top-heavy" but "nonetheless rewarding". Prefix Magazine also gave it a positive review and called it "much more accessible than its predecessor, but there isn't really a 'Maps' to serve as a gateway."

Other reviews are very average or mixed: Blender gave the album a score of three stars out of five and said of the band: "They're after something different here--it's just not as good as what they've left behind." Paste gave it a score of six out of ten and said that it was "replaced by a more temperate jangle". Now gave it three stars out of five and said, "It's time to move some units, so quirky's out and tunefulness is in." Billboard gave it an average review and said that "Much of the material... is more intimate and, at times, tentative." The New York Times also gave it an average review and said it "doesn't confide much, but it's a picture of a band that's not quite sure what to do next." The Guardian gave it two stars out of five and said that "despite finding some hooks worth pilfering, the band are still struggling to raise their game beyond White Stripes-goth-lite." The Austin Chronicle also gave it two stars out of five and said, "Gone is the glitzy art-punk, spastic freak-out, and unfathomable screaming. Here now instead is simple melody, nasal singing, and familiar songs."

=== Accolades ===
The album was nominated for Best Alternative Music Album at the 2007 Grammy Awards. In December 2006, the album was named the second best album of the year by NME magazine, as well as "Cheated Hearts" being voted the tenth best song. Rolling Stone magazine named it the forty-fourth best album of 2006, while Spin magazine ranked it number thirty-one on their list of the forty best albums of 2006. In 2009, Rhapsody ranked it number ten on the "Alt/Indie's Best Albums of the Decade" list. NME ranked it number thirty-two on their Top 100 Albums of the Decade list.

== Commercial performance ==
Show Your Bones debuted at number eleven on the US Billboard 200 with 56,000 copies sold in its first week. In the United Kingdom, the album had sold 112,819 copies by March 2009, and was certified gold by the British Phonographic Industry (BPI) on July 22, 2013. As of 2009, sales in the United States have reached 269,000 copies, according to Nielsen SoundScan.

== Track listing ==
All tracks are written by Yeah Yeah Yeahs.

No.	Title	Length
1.	"Gold Lion"	3:07
2.	"Way Out"	2:51
3.	"Fancy"	4:24
4.	"Phenomena"	4:10
5.	"Honeybear"	2:25
6.	"Cheated Hearts"	3:58
7.	"Dudley"	3:41
8.	"Mysteries"	2:35
9.	"The Sweets"	3:55
10.	"Warrior"	3:40
11.	"Turn Into"	4:05

UK edition bonus track
No.	Title	Length
12.	"Deja Vu"	3:23

Japanese edition bonus tracks
No.	Title	Length
12.	"Deja Vu"	3:23
13.	"Gold Lion" (video)

== Personnel ==
Credits adapted from the liner notes of Show Your Bones.

Yeah Yeah Yeahs

- Yeah Yeah Yeahs – production
- Brian Chase – drums, percussion, guitar
- Karen O – lead vocals, omnichord, piano (all tracks); mixing (tracks 4, 10, 11)
- Nick Zinner – guitar, mixing, keyboards

Additional personnel

- Squeak E. Clean – engineering, handclap chorus, production
- Chris Coady – engineering, handclap chorus
- Jamie Daughters – photography
- Brooke Gillespie – handclap chorus, studio assistant
- Julian Gross – art direction, cover
- Alan "Ringo" Labiner – assistant engineering, handclap chorus
- Roger Lian – sequencing
- Marshmellow – concept
- Money Mark – keyboards (tracks 3, 4)
- Alan Moulder – mixing
- Peter Najera – assistant engineering
- Chris Rakestraw – assistant engineering
- Andrew Savours – assistant engineering
- David Andrew Sitek – additional production (all tracks); MPC sampler (track 10)
- Howie Weinberg – mastering

== Charts ==
=== Weekly charts ===
Weekly chart performance for Show Your Bones
Chart (2006)	Peak position
Australian Albums Chart	17
Austrian Albums Chart	54
Belgian Albums Chart (Flanders)	43
Belgian Alternative Albums Chart (Flanders)	25
Belgian Albums Chart (Wallonia)	77
Canadian Albums Chart	9
European Top 100 Albums	23
French Albums Chart	96
German Albums Chart	65
Irish Albums Chart	17
Japanese Albums Chart	109
UK Albums Chart	7
US Billboard 200	11

=== Year-end charts ===
Year-end chart performance for Show Your Bones
Chart (2006)	Position
UK Albums (OCC)	184

== Release history ==
Region	Date	Label	Ref.
Japan	March 22, 2006	Universal	
Germany	March 24, 2006	Universal	
Ireland	March 24, 2006	Dress Up; Fiction; Polydor	
United Kingdom	March 27, 2006	Dress Up; Fiction; Polydor	
Canada	March 28, 2006	Universal	
United States	March 28, 2006	Dress Up; Interscope	
Australia	April 1, 2006	Modular	
