= Nick Zinner =

American guitarist

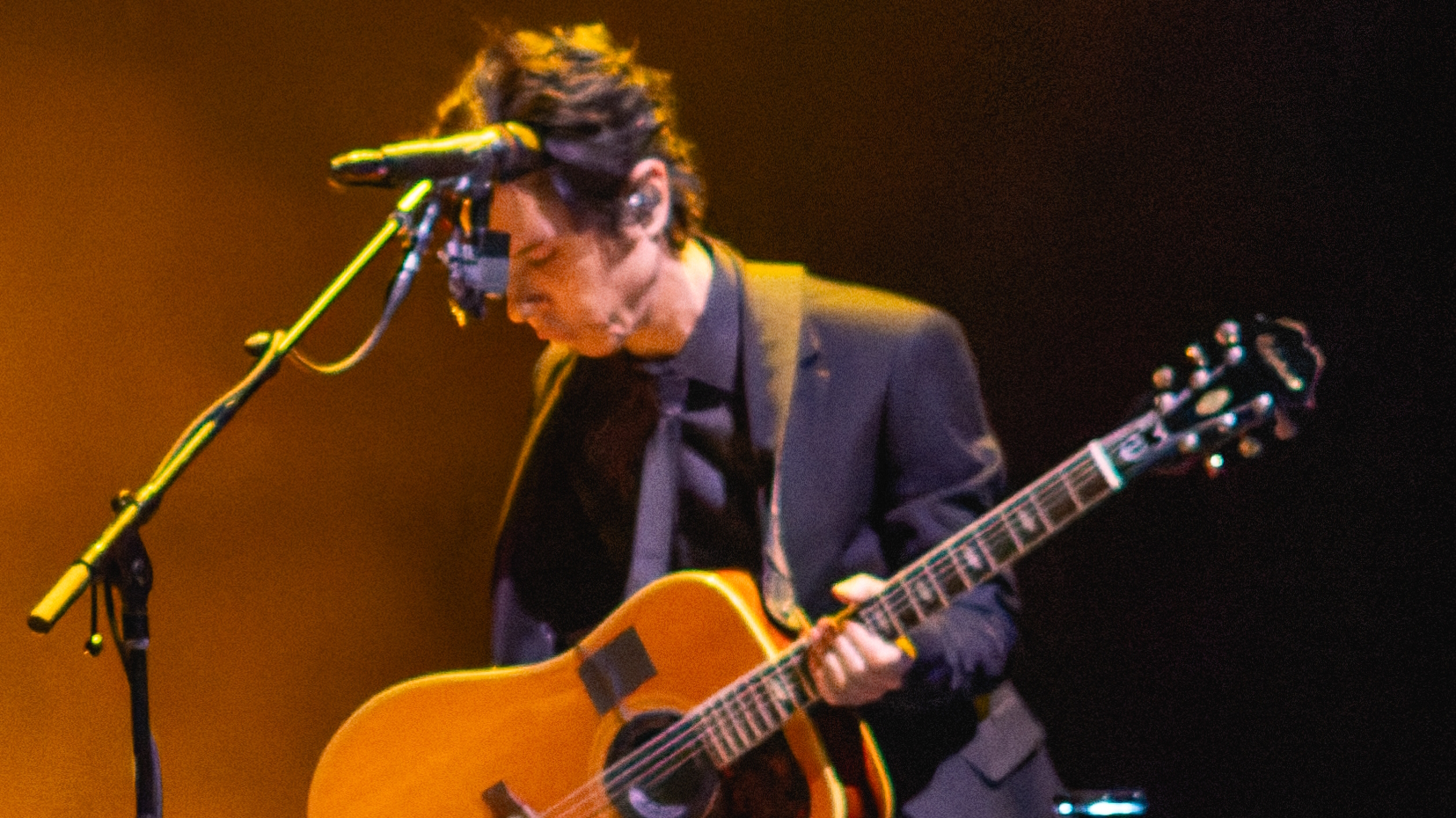
- Zinner performing at Royal Albert Hall in 2025

Background information
- Born: Nicholas Joseph Zinner; December 8, 1974 (age 51)
- Origin: Sharon, Massachusetts
- Genres: Alternative rock, new wave, art punk, indie rock, garage rock, hardcore punk, thrashcore
- Occupations: Guitarist, songwriter, producer, photographer
- Instruments: Guitar; keyboards; bass guitar; drums; piano
- Years active: 1990s–present
- Labels: Interscope, Shifty, Three One G
- Member of: Yeah Yeah Yeahs, The Rentals, Head Wound City
- Website: www.yeahyeahyeahs.com

Nicholas Joseph Zinner (born December 8, 1974) is an American musician and photographer who is the guitarist of the indie rock band Yeah Yeah Yeahs.

== Career ==
=== Music ===
Before forming the Yeah Yeahs Yeahs with Karen O and Brian Chase in 2000, Zinner attended Bard College where he played in the Boba Fett Experience, who later changed their name to Challenge of the Future because of concerns about being sued by George Lucas. The band moved to Williamsburg, Brooklyn in the late 1990s and broke up in 2001.

Since 2001, Zinner has many collaborative efforts with such acts as TV on the Radio, Har Mar Superstar, Ronnie Spector, The Horrors, and Scarlett Johansson. He contributed guitar and keyboard to several tracks on Bright Eyes' 2005 album Digital Ash in a Digital Urn and went on tour with the band as part of the rotating roster.

In 2005, Zinner formed a band Head Wound City along with members from The Locust and The Blood Brothers.

Zinner produced the re-mix of the track 'Compliments' on British group Bloc Party's 2005 album Silent Alarm Remixed, and has remixed The Plot to Blow Up the Eiffel Tower's song, "INRI," on their INRI ep. Zinner has also remixed Single Frame's song, "People are Germs," in addition to appearing in the music video.

In 2007, he also re-mixed The Hives's song, "Tick Tick Boom", which was used as a B-side for the release of their single "T.H.E.H.I.V.E.S".

In August 2009, Zinner was included at number 16 in NME magazine's future 50 list.

In early 2011, Zinner contributed guitar to the song "Go" by Santigold.

In May 2011, Zinner was commissioned to curate, compose and lead a performance 41 Strings in NYC to celebrate the 41st Earth Day. The performance, in which he collaborated with musicians Hisham Bharoocha and Ben Vida, involved 41 players of various stringed instruments, plus additional percussion and synthesiser parts. 41 Strings was performed at Sydney Opera House in Australia as part of Sydney Festival 2012, and Royal Festival Hall in London UK as part of James Lavelle's Meltdown in 2014 with guest guitarists from The XX, Savages, Deap Vally, Damon Albarn band, Magic Numbers and The Verve.

In 2013, Zinner reformed his college band Challenge of the Future to play a benefit show at Union Pool in Brooklyn to raise money for a friend's deceased daughter. Challenge of the Future then released the single "You Can't Call Off the Dog," which was recorded at Adrian Grenier's Wreckroom studio in New York.

In 2013, Zinner produced and recorded Santigold's contribution to the Hunger Games: Catching Fire soundtrack, "Shooting Arrows at the Sky." The 2015 album “Music in Exile” by Malian band Songhoy Blues was produced by him. In 2016 he produced the album Femejism by Deap Vally and "Sports" by Fufanu.

In 2018, Zinner was announced as the new guitarist of the alternative rock band The Rentals, and made his debut in their 2020 album Q36.

=== Photography ===
Zinner studied photography at Bard College and also in Lacoste, France. He has released four separate collections of his work: No Seats on the Party Car (2001), Slept in Beds (2003), I hope you are all happy now (2004) which features an introduction written by director Jim Jarmusch, and Please Take Me Off the Guest List (2010).

An exhibit – 1001 Images – of Zinner's photographs was mounted in NYC in October 2010 and in San Francisco in February 2011.

In January 2011, Zinner was commissioned by Lee Jeans to shoot their Winter ’11 advertising campaign.

In May 2011 A further exhibit of his photographs was mounted at the Anastasia Photo Gallery in New York City, featuring shots of the crowds at his concerts.

== Personal life ==
Zinner is a vegan and a supporter of PETA.

== Discography ==
With Yeah Yeah Yeahs

- Fever to Tell (2003)
- Show Your Bones (2006)
- It's Blitz! (2009)
- Mosquito (2013)
- Cool It Down (2022)

Other appearances

- The Blood Brothers – Crimes (2004) – "Wolf Party"
- Bright Eyes – Digital Ash in a Digital Urn (2005 · Saddle Creek)
- Head Wound City – Head Wound City EP (2005)
- Bloc Party – Silent Alarm Remixed (2005) – "Compliments (Shibuyaka Remix By Nick Zinner)"
- The Plot To Blow Up The Eiffel Tower – INRI (EP) (2006) – "INRI (Nick Zinner Remix)"
- Scarlett Johansson – Anywhere I Lay My Head (2008)
- Nickel Eye – The Time of the Assassins (2009)
- N.A.S.A. – The Spirit of Apollo (2009) – "Whachadoin?"
- James Iha – Look to the Sky (2012) – "Dream Tonight"
- Santigold – Master of My Make-Believe (2012)
- Songhoy Blues – Music in Exile
- Head Wound City – A New Wave of Violence (2016)
- Santigold – 99¢ (2016)
- Amen Dunes – Freedom (2018)
- Better Oblivion Community Center – Better Oblivion Community Center (album) (2019) – "Dylan Thomas" and "Dominoes"
- Liam Gallagher – Why Me? Why Not. (2019)
- Phoebe Bridgers – Punisher (album) (2020) – "I Know The End"
- Santigold – Spirituals (2022)
- Phoebe Bridgers – Lost Weekend (album) (2026) – "Kill Me"
