= Brian Chase =

American musician (born 1979)

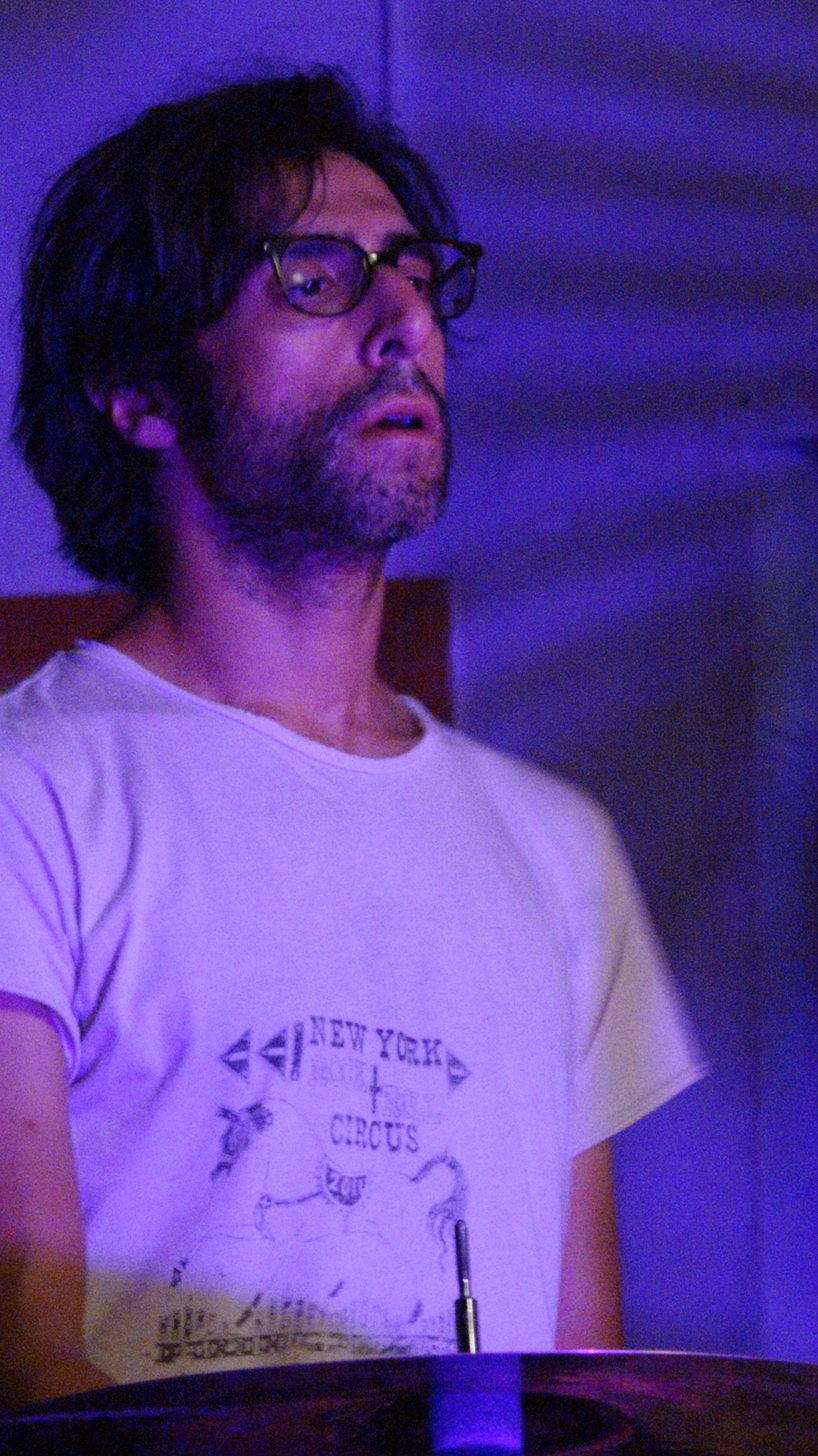
- Chase in 2016

Background information
- Born: February 12, 1978 (age 48); Huntington, New York, U.S.
- Origin: New York City, U.S.
- Genres: Alternative rock, fusion, drone
- Occupation: Musician
- Instrument: Drums
- Years active: 1990s–present
- Website: yeahyeahyeahs.com

Brian William Chase (born February 12, 1978) is an American drummer and drone musician who plays in the New York rock band Yeah Yeah Yeahs. He was ranked at No. 50 in Gigwise's list of The Greatest Drummers of All Time.

Chase has been described by the New York Times as "a consummate music nerd, a conservatory-trained jazz drummer who still plays in the city's experimental scene." He plays drums with traditional grip.

== Career ==
Chase met Karen O at Ohio's Oberlin College, and he joined the Yeah Yeah Yeahs in 2000 after their original drummer left the trio.

Outside of his rock work with the Yeah Yeah Yeahs, Chase has performed in a number of experimental duos with other musicians, such as Stefan Tcherepnin and Seth Misterka, with whom he released a CD Duo on the Australian Heathen Skulls label in 2007. Other musicians he has played with include Jessica Pavone, Mary Halvorson, Yonatan Gat, Moppa Elliott, and groups Oakley Hall, Blarvuster, and klezmer-fusionists The Sway Machinery.

In May 2010 the Chase/Misterka Duo performed at the Melbourne International Jazz Festival and then a month-long Australian tour. A second record The Shape of Sound was released to coincide.

In 2013, Chase released the album Drums & Drones. A follow-up, Drums & Drones II, was released in 2018 by Canadian label ICM. Chase's drone work has been inspired by his time working at La Monte Young and Marian Zazeela's Dream House, NYC.

He appeared on three tracks in the 2025 Foetus album Halt.

== Other ventures ==
Chase founded and operates Chaikin Records, a label named after his family's original name.

Chase portrayed E Street Band drummer Max Weinberg in the 2025 Bruce Springsteen biopic Springsteen: Deliver Me from Nowhere.
