= Maps (Yeah Yeah Yeahs song) =

2003 single by Yeah Yeah Yeahs

Single by Yeah Yeah Yeahs

from the album Fever to Tell
- Released: September 22, 2003
- Genre: Art punk; soul; indie rock
- Length: 3:34
- Label: Polydor; Interscope
- Songwriters: Brian Chase; Karen Lee Orzolek; Nick Zinner
- Producers: David Andrew Sitek; Yeah Yeah Yeahs

Yeah Yeah Yeahs singles chronology
"Pin" (2003)	"Maps" (2003)	"Y Control" (2004)

Music video
- "Maps" on YouTube

"Maps" is a song by the American indie rock band Yeah Yeah Yeahs, from their debut studio album, Fever to Tell (2003). It was released as a single in the United Kingdom by Polydor in September 2003, while distribution in the United States was handled by Interscope in February 2004. The song is built around a looped guitar riff and features lyrics inspired by singer Karen O's turbulent relationship with her boyfriend at the time.

"Maps" was acclaimed for its emotional weight and Karen O's vulnerable vocals. In the United States, it became the band's highest-charting single on the Billboard Hot 100 at number 87 and the Modern Rock Tracks chart at number 9. Internationally, it reached the top 40 in the United Kingdom and certified silver. The song's music video, directed by Patrick Daughters and featuring the band in a gymnasium, received heavy rotation on MTV, went viral, and earned four MTV Video Music Award nominations.

"Maps" became the band's signature song and an essential work of the 2000s garage rock revival and post-punk revival, as well as the contemporary New York music scene. It has inspired other artists, spawning numerous covers and remixes, and appears on several critics' rankings of the best songs of the decade and of all time.

== Recording ==
By the end of 2002, the indie rock band Yeah Yeah Yeahs received international attention with the release of their self-titled debut EP and for their energetic live concerts. They began work on their debut album, Fever to Tell, that same year, rejecting offers from major record labels, as they felt it would compromise their creative control. "Maps" began with a riff played on a whim by guitarist Nick Zinner in the band's shared home. Singer and lyricist Karen O heard it as she walked by his door, and sang along to it, writing the song in 20 minutes.

The earliest demos of "Maps" were conceived using Zinner's drum machine and a four-track recorder; they were later released as part of a deluxe edition of Fever to Tell. The final version was recorded with the rest of the album at Headgear Studio in Brooklyn and co-produced with David Andrew Sitek of TV on the Radio, a longtime collaborator and friend of the band. It was mixed by Zinner and Alan Moulder at Eden Studios in London and mastered by Howie Weinberg at Masterdisk in New York City. The single artwork was designed by Cody Critcheloe, who also provided the graphics for Fever to Tell and its related media.

== Composition ==
Maps
Sample of "Maps", with the lyric "Wait! They don't love you like I love you" beginning a few seconds before the final chorus.

"Maps" is characterized as an art punk, soul, and indie rock song, with a runtime of 3 minutes and 34 seconds. (Note: The album version of "Maps" extends it to three minutes and 39 seconds, as it transitions into the next song, "Y Control".) According to sheet music published by editors at BMG Rights Management, the song is composed in 4/4 time, in the key of G major. The track is built around a guitar loop consisting of a single D note, which critics have described as a "ringing" and "trilling" riff. Zinner plays two guitar solos following the second and third choruses. Brian Chase's drum part, described as a "maelstrom", features a kick drum on nearly every beat, beds of toms, and a stuttering snare pattern. Karen O's vocal range spans from G3 to D4.

All three band members are credited as writers of "Maps", but then-manager Asif Ahmed stated that Karen O was responsible for writing "one hundred percent" of the song. She intended to create a love song that would not only endure over time but reach a wider audience. Its lyrics were inspired by a tumultuous period in her relationship with then-boyfriend Angus Andrew, frontman of Liars. She employs the rule of three in the pre-chorus and second verse, as heard in the lyric "Oh, say, say, say". The repeated line "They don't love you like I love you" was adapted from an email she had sent Andrew. It has been suggested that "Maps" is an acronym for "My Angus Please Stay," though this has never been addressed by the band.

== Release ==
Though Yeah Yeah Yeahs were hesitant to join a major label, they signed to Interscope at the insistence of Lee Ranaldo (Sonic Youth) in February 2003. Polydor, a sister label of Interscope, released "Maps" in the United Kingdom on September 22, 2003, and in Australia on October 6, 2003. The band were unsure whether the song would fare well in the United States, even as their friends urged an earlier release, and Zinner himself recognized it as a "big moment". Interscope ultimately delayed distribution in the US until February 10, 2004.

== Reception ==
"Maps" was commercially successful, and, although distribution to alternative radio was delayed, marked a commercial breakthrough for the band. It greatly increased sales of Fever to Tell, which rose from 124,000 units shipped in its release year to a million units by the end of the decade. It first charted in the United Kingdom, debuting at number 26 on the UK singles chart on April 10, 2003. It next entered the Scottish Singles Chart on September 27, 2003, peaking at number 35. In the United States, it debuted at number 98 on the Billboard Hot 100 on March 13, 2004, spending 13 weeks there and peaking at number 87 on May 1, 2004. It entered the Modern Rock Tracks chart on March 13, peaking at number 9 and remaining on the chart for 18 weeks. It has been certified silver in the United Kingdom for selling over 200,000 units, and gold in New Zealand for selling over 15,000 units.

"Maps" received widespread acclaim from music critics. Chris Eggertsen of Billboard observed that, because the band were known for their unpredictability, the song was an unexpected "emotional centerpiece" of their repertoire that distilled "romantic agony into its most primal form". While Josh Tyrangiel from Entertainment Weekly thought the rest of the album felt "a bit empty", he cited "Maps" as one "glorious exception" and "the kind of track you can get lost in. The kind you'll play over and over for all the right reasons." Pitchfork's Eric Carr appreciated Karen O's emotive vocals, which differed from the album's other songs, writing that it is "one of the only Y-Y-Yeahs songs on record where she brings her "squeal" down to a "sing", and quite possibly the only song period in which she does so with unprecedented grace, reining in the authority she cultivates elsewhere." David Antrobus of PopMatters quipped that Karen O's "astonishingly deft and heartfelt" performance could evoke emotion from a mannequin, also praising Zinner's guitar work and writing, "Any permission for all those haughty indie kids to access their broken hearts has to be a very good thing. And I mean that in the kindest possible way."

In NPR Music's podcast All Songs Considered, Mikel Jollett and John Richards cited "Maps" as one of 2003's best songs, describing it as "One of the most intense, emotional rock releases in recent memory". In other year-end lists, NME placed the song at number 6, Pitchfork at 28, PopMatters at 5, and The Village Voice at 18 on their Pazz & Jop poll. Because of its delayed release, Billboard instead ranked it among the 100 best songs of 2004, at 9.

== Music video ==
Karen O famously cries in the music video for "Maps"

The music video for "Maps" was directed by Patrick Daughters, his second directorial effort and second video for Yeah Yeah Yeahs. Karen O was comfortable working with Daughters as they were close friends, and he had previously directed the video for the band's single "Date with the Night" and filmed their rehearsals and live performances.

The video was shot in a high school gymnasium. It begins with a pan from crew members to a makeshift stage, which lights up as the band members enter one by one and begin performing for an indifferent crowd. Various lighting filters are used to change the color of the room and illuminate the band members' faces. Angus Andrew was supposed to appear in the video but arrived three hours late, leaving Karen O in an emotional state. As a result, she is famously seen crying in the video; this moment was not staged. She explains:

They were real tears. My boyfriend at the time was supposed to come to the shoot — he was three hours late and I was just about to leave for tour. I didn't think he was even going to come and this was the song that was written for him.

The music video premiered in October 2003 on JBTV and began airing in heavy rotation on MTV in February 2004. It went viral on the internet and had a high download rate on the file-sharing site Napster, netting over 114 million views on YouTube as of 2026. It was nominated at the 2004 MTV Video Music Awards for Best Art Direction, Best Editing, Best Cinematography, and the MTV2 Award. By 2006, The New Yorker noted the video had become a MTV2 staple, and Rolling Stone observed that its viral success led to extensive radio airplay. Rolling Stone also placed it on its 2021 list of "100 Greatest Music Videos", writing that it captured "the duality of that era's NYC rock revival" better than other videos of the time.

== Live performances ==
Maps (Live at the Fillmore)
Sample of a live version of "Maps", from the band's performance at the Fillmore in 2004, where Karen O is delivering a spoken word introduction.

Yeah Yeah Yeahs first performed "Maps" for a John Peel Session in October 2002, recorded at Maida Vale Studios. That same month, they added the song to their live repertoire as part of the eight-month-long Fever to Tell Tour. Even before its official single release, the song became a staple of the band's live shows and has since been played at virtually every concert. Karen O remarked in 2004 that "We had been playing these songs (Fever to Tell) for a year and a half. People would be calling out for 'Maps' at the shows."

"Maps" has been interpreted in various ways compared to its studio version. Karen O has sometimes delivered a spoken word introduction, in which she thanks audience members and the families of each band member, extending the song's runtime by several minutes before beginning to sing. The audience often joins in to chant the chorus, which has been observed by The Standard to have a "devastating" yet "intimate" effect. The song has also been frequently performed in a stripped-down acoustic arrangement, with the band even including a string section during their 2025 Hidden in Pieces Tour.

== Legacy ==
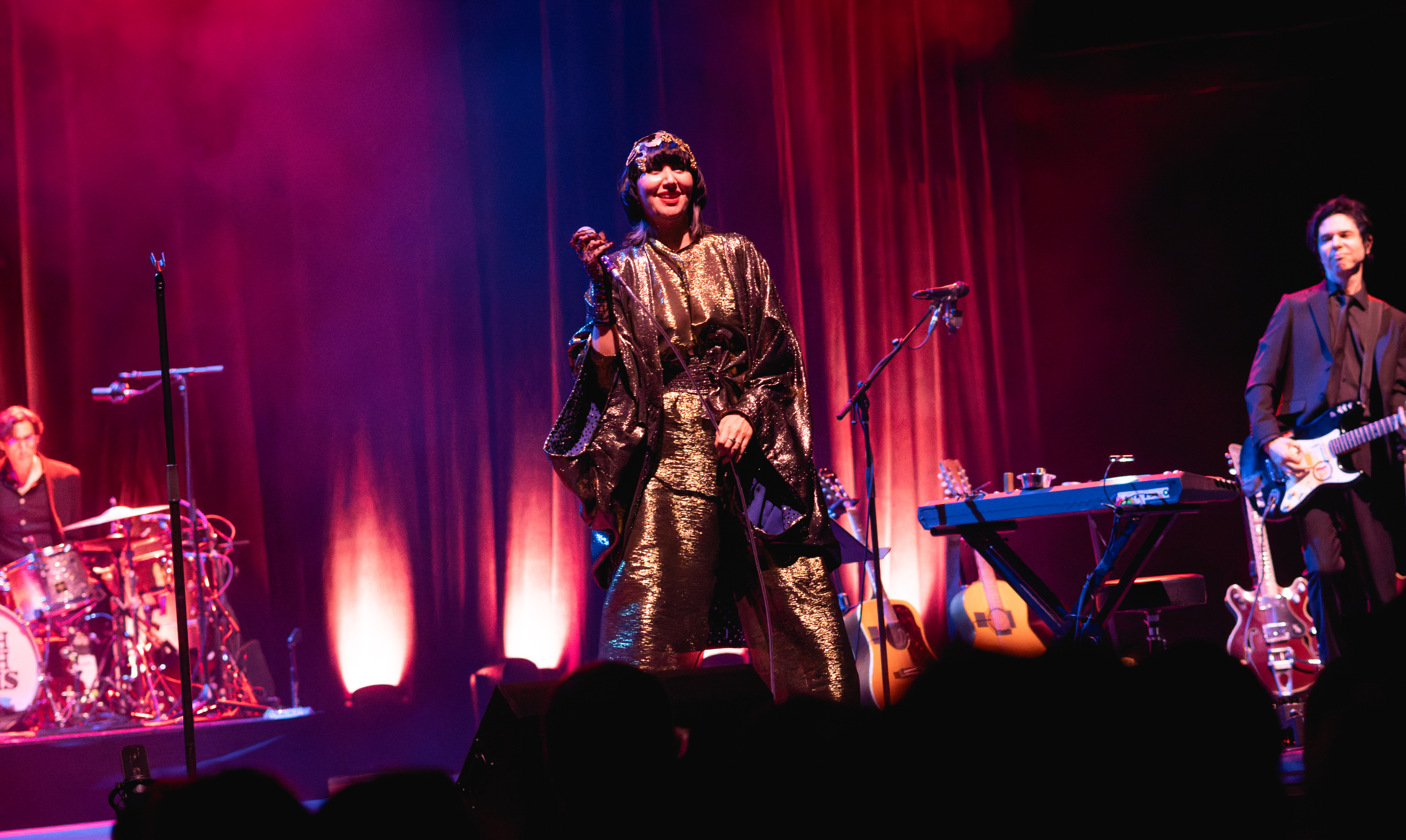
"Maps" played a significant role in the popularity of Yeah Yeah Yeahs (pictured performing at the Royal Albert Hall in 2025)

"Maps" cemented Yeah Yeah Yeahs's status in the garage rock revival, post-punk revival, and New York music scene of the 2000s. In an article for Under the Radar, August Brown argued that the song "sounded like nothing else on the radio at the time and proved that an innovative, even arty pop band can still be gold." Emma Madden of Billboard believed the song and its music video built a relationship between pop and indie, writing that "Those real tears, sweaty hair and desperate insistence of "Wait! They don't love you like I love you" became a source of true human emotion that pop records have been co-opting since its release in 2003." Brittany Spanos, in a podcast for Rolling Stone, called it a "pop crossover moment, joining the lexicon of great and timeless rock and roll love songs". Regarding its impact, Karen O said, "there's just not a lot of bands that have one of their biggest songs as a love song. So I'm pretty stoked about that".

"Maps" is often considered Yeah Yeah Yeahs's signature song as well as one of their greatest. Paste named it the band's best song in 2013, writing that "If you didn't feel anything by the time Zinner ripped into his triumphant, octaved guitars or Karen O confided "They don't love you like I love you", you might not have a beating heart." NME and Stereogum also placed it first on their respective rankings of the band's songs in 2018. The former said it features the band "at their most inviting — a heart-warming, truly beautiful track, worthy of its place among the pantheon of pints-aloft, gig-ending tearjerkers", and Stereogum observed that it "would go on to inform decades of indie rock-influenced, female-fronted vulnerable pop". On All Songs Considered, NPR journalists also dubbed "Maps" a "defining Millennial song".

At the end of the decade, Pitchfork placed "Maps" at 6 on its "500 Tracks of the 2000s" list, The Guardian at 6 on its "Top 10 Tracks of the 2000s" list, and Rolling Stone at 7 on its "100 Best Songs of the 2000s" list. In 2011, NME ranked "Maps" first on its "Greatest Alternative Love Songs" list and at 55 on its "150 Best Tracks of the Past 15 Years" list. In 2014, NME placed "Maps" at 39 on its "500 Greatest Songs of All Time" list. In 2018, NPR ranked "Maps" second on its "200 Greatest Songs by 21st Century Women+" list. In 2021, Rolling Stone placed it at 101 on its "500 Greatest Songs of All Time" list; the same publication placed it second on its "250 Greatest Songs of the 21st Century So Far" list in 2025, and first on its "200 Greatest Rock Songs of the 21st Century So Far" list in 2026.

== Track listing ==
All tracks are written by Yeah Yeah Yeahs.

CD and digital download
No.	Title	Length
1.	"Maps"	3:34
2.	"Countdown"	3:39
3.	"Miles Away" (John Peel Session (Note: Produced by Miti Adhikari and engineered by George Thomas.))	2:30
4.	"Maps" (Video)	4:20

== Personnel ==
Credits are adapted from the 2004 CD liner notes.

Yeah Yeah Yeahs

- Brian Chase – drums, production
- Karen O – vocals, production
- Nick Zinner – guitars, drum machine, mixing, production

Additional personnel

- Cody Critcheloe – artwork
- Alan Moulder – mixing
- David Andrew Sitek – production
- Howie Weinberg – mastering

== Charts ==
=== Weekly charts ===
Weekly chart performance for "Maps"
Chart (2003–2004)	Peak position
Scottish Singles (OCC)	35
UK Singles (OCC)	26
US Billboard Hot 100 (Billboard)	87
US Modern Rock Tracks (Billboard)	9

=== Year-end charts ===
Year-end chart performance for "Maps"
Chart (2004)	Position
US Modern Rock Tracks (Billboard)	49

== Certifications ==
Certifications and sales for "Maps"
Region	Certification	Certified units/sales
New Zealand (RMNZ)	Gold	15,000^{‡}
United Kingdom (BPI)	Silver	200,000^{‡}
^{‡} Sales+streaming figures based on certification alone.

== Other versions ==
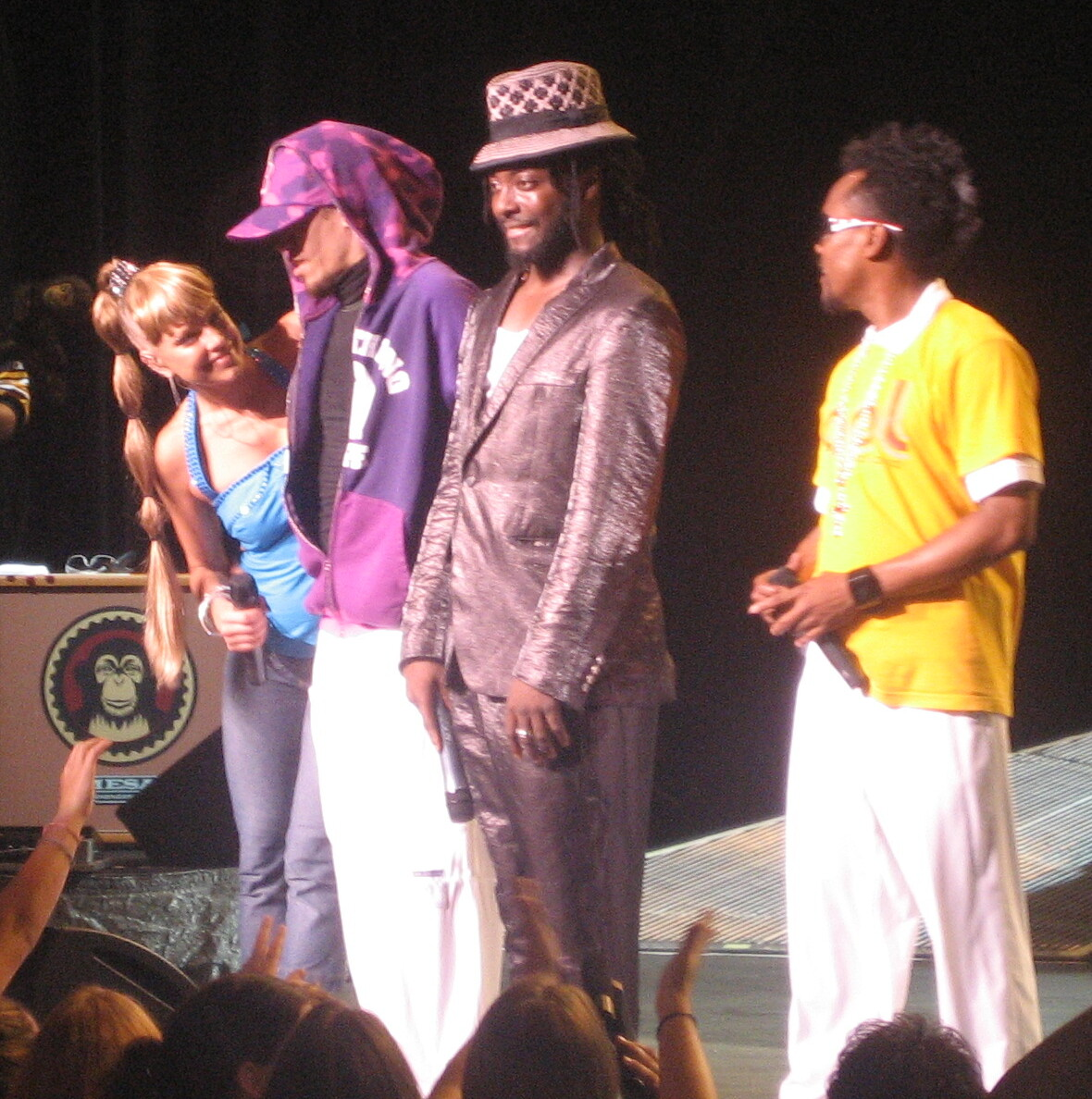
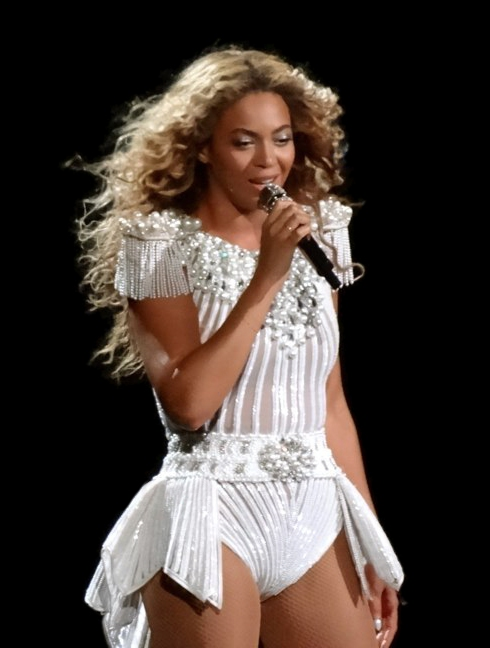
"Maps" has been covered and sampled by artists including the hip-hop group Black Eyed Peas and the R&B singer Beyoncé.

"Maps" has been covered by artists including the garage rock duo the White Stripes, the indie rock band Arcade Fire, the pop rock band the Fray, the hardcore punk singer Ted Leo, the soul singer Macy Gray, the rock singer Cary Brothers with folk singer Priscilla Ahn, the English folk musician Keaton Henson, the R&B singer Anderson .Paak, the jazz group the Bad Plus, the punk rock group Camp Cope, the multi-instrumentalist Freya Ridings, the indie rock musician Samia, the rock band the Killers, the country singer Sasami, the folk rock band the Wood Brothers, and the alternative rock musician St. Vincent. It was also added to the video game Rock Band in 2009.

The pop singer Kelly Clarkson's 2004 single "Since U Been Gone", written and produced by Max Martin and Lukasz "Dr. Luke" Gottwald, features a similar composition to "Maps". Though Gottwald says it was inspired by the indie rock bands the Hives and the Strokes, the songs share a similar guitar line in the middle eight and the key of G major. Karen O remarked it was "like getting bitten by a poisonous varmint" but quipped, "If it wasn't her, it just would've been Ashlee Simpson." Zinner said that "I can't say that the word lawsuit hasn't crossed my mind, but at the same time... the YYYs have definitely stolen stuff before... so I guess it's karmic." The hip-hop group Black Eyed Peas also sampled "Maps" for their 2009 single "Meet Me Halfway", and the R&B singer Beyoncé interpolated it for her 2016 single "Hold Up", which netted the band songwriting credits.

A sped-up version of "Maps" gained popularity on TikTok in 2024, often set to a dance using different contexts of wanting someone to stop and listen to them. As a result, it topped the TikTok Billboard Top 50 for eight weeks from October to November 2024.
