= Spitting Off the Edge of the World =

Single by Yeah Yeah Yeahs featuring Perfume Genius

from the album Cool It Down
- Released: June 1, 2022
- Length: 4:17
- Label: Secretly Canadian
- Songwriters: Brian Chase; David Andrew Sitek; Karen Orzolek; Nick Zinner
- Producer: David Andrew Sitek

Yeah Yeah Yeahs singles chronology
"Despair" (2013)	"Spitting Off the Edge of the World" (2022)	"Burning" (2022)

Music video
- "Spitting Off the Edge of the World" on YouTube

"Spitting Off the Edge of the World" is a song by American indie rock band Yeah Yeah Yeahs, featuring American musician Perfume Genius, from their fifth studio album, Cool It Down (2022). It was released by Secretly Canadian as the album's lead single in June 2022, marking their first single release in nine years. Written by the band and producer David Andrew Sitek, "Spitting Off the Edge of the World" is a power ballad with lyrics inspired by singer Karen O's thoughts on the climate crisis.

"Spitting Off the Edge of the World" was praised by reviewers and nominated for the Grammy Award for Best Alternative Music Performance; it reached the top 30 of digital charts in Australia, the United Kingdom and the United States, and topped Billboard's television and digital rock charts. The song's music video was directed by Cody Critcheloe and nominated for the Libera Award for Video of the Year.

== Background and recording ==
In April 2013, Yeah Yeah Yeahs achieved their highest peak on the US Billboard 200 with their fourth studio album, Mosquito, at number five. In December 2014, lead singer and pianist Karen O announced the band were "on a bit of hiatus" due to a lack of inspiration. Yeah Yeah Yeahs announced their comeback in June 2017, sparsely playing shows over the next five years and reissuing their debut studio album, Fever to Tell, in the interim. In May 2022, the band announced new music.

"Spitting Off the Edge of the World" was written by the band and David Andrew Sitek (their longtime collaborator and producer) for their fifth studio album, Cool It Down (2022). It was recorded at either Sonic Ranch in Texas, Federal Prism in California, or guitarist Nick Zinner's basement. It was mixed by Shawn Everett and mastered by Greg Calbi and Steve Fallone.

== Composition ==
Spitting Off the Edge of the World
A sample from "Spitting Off the Edge of the World"

"Spitting Off the Edge of the World" is a power ballad that runs for four minutes and seventeen seconds. The song is characterized by synthesizers, "keening" riffs and "crashing" drums, creating what critics have called an "ominous" atmosphere. Karen O sings lead on the song alongside guest vocals performed by Perfume Genius, the second time Yeah Yeah Yeahs includes a featured artist on any of their songs.

The lyrics were inspired by Karen O's thoughts on both the climate crisis and the COVID-19 pandemic. She told Rolling Stone in 2022 that "I see the younger generations staring down this threat, and they're standing on the edge of a precipice, confronting what’s coming with anger and defiance, it's galvanizing, and there's hope there." Heather Phares of AllMusic interpreted the lyrics as "a radiant yet heartbroken meditation on the ecologically broken world left to the next generation".

== Release and reception ==
"Spitting Off the Edge of the World" was released by Secretly Canadian on June 1, 2022, as the lead single from Cool It Down. Upon release, the song peaked at number 21 on the ARIA Digital Tracks chart. In 2025, after appearing in the science fiction film The Gorge, it topped the Billboard Top TV Songs and Rock Digital Song Sales charts. That same year, it reached number fifteen on the Digital Song Sales chart, number two on the Alternative Digital Song Sales chart, and number 29 on the UK singles sales chart.

"Spitting Off the Edge of the World" received positive reviews from critics and was nominated for the inaugural Best Alternative Music Performance award at the 2023 Grammys. In her review of Cool It Down, AllMusic's Heather Phares considered Karen O's songwriting to be at its most refined and Yeah Yeah Yeahs at their most consistent. Stacey Anderson of NPR praised the "great, filmic swaths of synths", "ominous production", and Karen O's vocals; the inclusion of Perfume Genius was also welcomed, with Anderson writing "together they build slowly through this pain, ultimately embracing an aura of heels-down defiance, a faith in the path of resistance."

Pitchfork's Ryan Dombal awarded the song a best new track title and wrote, "Karen [O]'s delivery is painfully vulnerable one moment and strident the next, pinging between existential hopelessness and mighty resistance. The song's titular refrain nails this internal conflict—a small act of defiance hocked into a bottomless abyss." Jem Aswad at Variety similarly deemed it a "killer new song", praising Brian Chase's "powerhouse drumming, Zinner's towering guitars and O's unmistakable vocals" and comparing it to the sound of their 2009 album, It's Blitz!.

== Music video ==
Screenshot from the video depicting Yeah Yeah Yeahs mid-performance

The accompanying music video for "Spitting Off the Edge of the World" was directed by Cody Critcheloe, who previously designed the artwork for Fever to Tell. It stars Karen O and Perfume Genius, with Brian Chase and Nick Zinner making cameo appearances. The band were elated to work with Critcheloe again, calling it "a dream collaboration". The video was filmed in Kansas City, Missouri in locations including the Kansas City International Airport and atop a downtown building. For the video, Critcheloe built a custom limousine, designed a Yeah Yeah Yeahs-styled gas station and rebuilt a former local punk venue to hold a private concert. The band loved the result "so much that it hurts."

The video was released simultaneously with the single release of "Spitting Off the Edge of the World", and has received ten million views on YouTube as of January 2026. In a review of the video for Vulture, Justin Curto wrote "No way we're cooling it down with the Yeah Yeah Yeahs fully back." At the 2023 Libera Awards, it was nominated for Video of the Year but lost to "Ur Mom" by Wet Leg.

== Personnel ==
Credits adapted from the liner notes of Cool It Down.

Yeah Yeah Yeahs

- Karen O – vocals, synthesizer, writing
- Nick Zinner – guitar, synthesizer, writing
- Brian Chase – drums, cymbals, percussion, writing

Additional personnel

- Perfume Genius – vocals

Technical personnel

- David Andrew Sitek – production, writing
- Shawn Everett – mixing
- Greg Calbi – mastering
- Steve Fallone – mastering

== Charts ==
2022 chart performance for "Spitting Off the Edge of the World"
Chart (2022)	Peak position
Australia Digital Tracks (ARIA)	21

2025 chart performance for "Spitting Off the Edge of the World"
Chart (2025)	Peak position
UK Singles Sales (OCC)	15
US Alternative Digital Song Sales (Billboard)	2
US Digital Song Sales (Billboard)	15
US Rock Digital Song Sales (Billboard)	1
US Top TV Songs (Billboard)	1
