= Date with the Night =

Single by Yeah Yeah Yeahs

from the album Fever to Tell
- Released: April 14, 2003
- Recorded: Headgear Studio (Brooklyn)
- Genre: Post-punk
- Length: 2:38
- Label: Polydor
- Songwriters: Brian Chase; Karen Lee Orzolek; Nick Zinner
- Producers: David Andrew Sitek; Yeah Yeah Yeahs

Yeah Yeah Yeahs singles chronology
"Machine" (2002)	"Date with the Night" (2003)	"Pin" (2003)

Music video
- "Date With The Night" on YouTube

"Date with the Night" is a song by the American indie rock band Yeah Yeah Yeahs and second track on their debut studio album, Fever to Tell (2003). It was released by Polydor Records in April 2003 as the album's lead single. The song was written and composed by the band, with singer and lyricist Karen O describing a sexually charged night. "Date with the Night" peaked at number nineteen on the Scottish singles chart and number sixteen on the United Kingdom singles chart, the band's highest UK entry to date. It received positive reviews from critics for its sound and Karen O's manic vocals.

== Recording ==
Yeah Yeah Yeahs was formed in 2000, with the lineup Karen O, Nick Zinner and Brian Chase. The band made its recording debut in 2001 with the extended play Yeah Yeah Yeahs, which was named NME's best track of 2002 and entered three charts worldwide. Positive reviews of their performances led to signing offers from major record labels, which the band ignored in order to maintain creative control of their debut album. "Date with the Night" was written sometime in 2002 and recorded during the Fever to Tell sessions at Headgear Studio in Brooklyn.

== Release ==
"Date with the Night" was released as the first single from Fever to Tell on April 14, 2003 by Polydor Records. It includes the B-sides "Yeah! New York" and a remix of "Bang", a track from their debut EP, by Little Stranger. The accompanying music video for "Date with the Night" was directed by Patrick Daughters, his first of many videos directed for the band, and coincided with the single release.

== Reception ==
"Date with the Night" peaked on the UK singles chart at number sixteen, their highest-peaking single in the United Kingdom, and on the Scottish singles chart at number nineteen. The song was positively received by critics. Allmusic's Tom Maginnis said that "the band scatter sinewy riffs laced with soiled power chords and volcanic eruptions of white noise with joyous irreverence." Blender noted that the song had a "disco pulse," and Entertainment Weekly's Emily Wilson called the song "ferocious." Pitchfork praised the song's "stop/start emergency-room shriek." The Guardian noted that "You scarcely notice how mannered the vocals are when there is great music powering away behind" Karen O.

== Usage in media ==
The song is available as a downloadable track for the music video game series Rock Band. The song is also featured on the soundtrack for the British teen soap opera Skins and is used in an episode opening scene in the second season of Netflix's Daredevil.

== Track listing ==
UK CD single (2003)

1. "Date with the Night" – 2:38
2. "Yeah! New York" – 2:05
3. "Bang (Little Stranger Remix)" – 3:29

== Personnel ==
Yeah Yeah Yeahs

- Karen O – vocals, writing, production
- Nick Zinner – guitars, production
- Brian Chase – drums, production

Additional personnel

- David Andrew Sitek – production
- Cody Critcheloe – artwork

== Charts ==
Chart performance for "Date With The Night"
Chart (2003)	Peak position
UK Singles (Official Charts)	16
