= Burning (Yeah Yeah Yeahs song) =

2022 single by Yeah Yeah Yeahs

Single by Yeah Yeah Yeahs

from the album Cool It Down
- Released: August 10, 2022
- Length: 4:05
- Label: Secretly Canadian
- Songwriters: Karen Orzolek; Nick Zinner; Brian Chase; David Andrew Sitek; Bob Gaudio; Peggy Farina
- Producer: Andrew Wyatt

Yeah Yeah Yeahs singles chronology
"Spitting Off the Edge of the World" (2022)	"Burning" (2022)	"Wolf" (2022)

"Burning" is a song by American indie rock band Yeah Yeah Yeahs from their fifth studio album, Cool It Down (2022). It was released by Secretly Canadian as the album's second single in August 2022. Written by the band and produced by Andrew Wyatt, "Burning" was inspired from lead singer Karen O's experience of losing most of her belongings in a fire when she was nineteen.

== Background ==
Yeah Yeah Yeahs aspired to make new material as early as 2020, but were halted by the COVID-19 pandemic. In May 2022, after a lengthy recording hiatus, the band announced they were creating new music. They confirmed that their fifth studio album, Cool It Down, would be released later that year. It was preceded by the successful digital single "Spitting Off the Edge of the World".

== Composition ==
"Burning" is a dance and soul song that runs for four minutes and five seconds. According to lead singer and songwriter Karen O, the lyrics of "Burning" are about "smoke signals for the soul. Begging to cool it down, just doing it the best we know how." After witnessing the 2020 California wildfires, Karen O recalled losing all of her personal items to an apartment fire when she was nineteen, except for her sketchbooks and family photos. Her experiences in the aftermath shaped the song's themes.

"Burning" is driven by a repeating piano riff sampled from "Beggin" by the Four Seasons. As a result, both Bob Gaudio and Peggy Farina received songwriting credits alongside Karen O, guitarist Nick Zinner, and drummer Brian Chase.

== Release and reception ==
"Burning" was released by Secretly Canadian on August 10, 2022, as the second single from Cool It Down. The song received positive reviews from critics and peaked at number 16 on Billboard's Alternative Airplay chart, remaining there for 20 weeks. At the 2026 Libera Awards, it was nominated for Best Sync Usage.

In her review of Cool It Down, AllMusic's Heather Phares believed "Burning" featured the best vocals from Karen O to date, likening her "wails and whispers" to "forces of nature". Jon Blistein of Rolling Stone appreciated the Four Seasons sample and felt it "boast(s) some of that soulful Sixties energy." The Fader's Jordan Darville felt the band brought a "thunderstorm" to the dance floor. Writing for Uproxx, Adrian Spinell observed the band "have returned all up in their feels and we’re absolutely here for it."

== Music video ==
The accompanying music video for "Burning" was directed by Cody Critcheloe, who previously designed the artwork for the band's debut Fever to Tell. Its visuals were inspired by West Side Story.
