= Y Control =

2004 single by Yeah Yeah Yeahs

Single by Yeah Yeah Yeahs

from the album Fever to Tell
- Released: June 1, 2004
- Studio: Headgear (Brooklyn)
- Genre: Dance-punk; art punk; garage punk; new wave
- Length: 4:00
- Label: Interscope
- Songwriter(s): Yeah Yeah Yeahs
- Producer(s): Dave Andrew Sitek; Yeah Yeah Yeahs

Yeah Yeah Yeahs singles chronology
"Maps" (2004)	"Y Control" (2004)	"Gold Lion" (2006)

Music video
- "Y Control" on YouTube

"Y Control" is a single by Yeah Yeah Yeahs, from their debut album, Fever to Tell. The song's music video was controversial for its disturbing imagery; nonetheless, it received some play on MTV and its sister station, MTV2. The song is part of the soundtrack of the 2009 video game Dirt 2.

== Critical reception ==
The song was met with universal acclaim upon its release, with many critics noting it as one of the album's highlights. Pitchfork Media listed "Y Control" as the 213th best song of the decade.

== Music video ==
The music video for "Y Control", directed by Spike Jonze, was controversial for its images of children carrying the body of a dead dog, giving the middle finger, and a subtitled portrayal of child mutilation including the chopping of a boy's hand and another boy disemboweling himself with a knife. MTV and MTV2 agreed to air the video; however, they included a disclaimer from Jonze at the beginning, and blurred out some of the video's more offensive material. The unedited version is available on their "Tell Me What Rockers to Swallow" DVD.

Entertainment Weekly gave a negative review of the video, describing it as "a sort of fairy tale gone wrong," and calling it "amateurish." It was put into rotation on MTV and MTV2.

== Commercial performance ==
The song reached number 54 on the UK Singles chart. It was the least successful single from Fever to Tell.

== Track listing ==
1. "Y Control"
2. "Y Control" (The Faint remix)
3. "Y Control" (Live at the Fillmore)

== Credits and personnel ==
Credits are adapted from the liner notes of Fever to Tell.

- Brian Chase – producer, songwriter, drums
- Karen O – producer, songwriter, vocals
- Nick Zinner – producer, songwriter, guitars, drum machine
- Dave Andrew Sitek – producer
- Paul Mahajan – engineer
- Alan Moulder – mixing
- Nick Zinner – mixing
- Ric Levy – mixing assistant
- Howie Weinberg – mastering
- Roger Lian – digital editing

== Charts ==
Weekly chart positions for "Y Control"
Chart (2004)	Peak position
Scotland (OCC)	59
UK Singles (OCC)	54
