= Machine (EP) =

EP by Yeah Yeah Yeahs
- Released: November 5, 2002
- Recorded: Headgear Studio in Brooklyn, NY
- Genres: Indie rock, garage punk
- Length: 7:15
- Label: Touch & Go
- Producers: David Andrew Sitek; Yeah Yeah Yeahs

Yeah Yeah Yeahs chronology
Yeah Yeah Yeahs (2001)	Machine (2002)	Fever to Tell (2003)

Yeah Yeah Yeahs singles chronology
"Machine" (2002)	"Date with the Night" (2003)

Singles from Machine
- 1. "Machine" Released: November 11, 2002

Professional ratings
Aggregate scores
Source	Rating
Metacritic	54/100
Review scores
Source	Rating
AllMusic	3/5 stars
Drowned in Sound	(5/10)
Neumu.net	7/10 stars
Pitchfork	(3.9/10)
The Rolling Stone Album Guide	3/5 stars
Stylus Magazine	D

Machine is the second EP by the indie rock band Yeah Yeah Yeahs. It was released in 2002 by Touch and Go Records, and contains three songs from the Fever to Tell sessions. From this EP came one single, "Machine", which was released only in the UK. As of 2009, sales in the United States have exceeded 24,000 copies, according to Nielsen SoundScan.

== Track listing ==
No.	Title	Length
1.	"Machine"	3:20
2.	"Graveyard"	1:35
3.	"Pin" (Remix)	2:20

Machine 7" single
No.	Title	Length
1.	"Machine"	3:20
2.	"Graveyard"	1:35

== Personnel ==
- Karen O – Vocals
- Nick Zinner – Guitars
- Brian Chase – Drums

== Production ==
- Producers: David Andrew Sitek, Yeah Yeah Yeahs
- Engineer: Paul Mahajan
- Photography: Shannon Sinclair
