= Pin (Yeah Yeah Yeahs song) =

Single by Yeah Yeah Yeahs

from the album Fever to Tell
- Released: June 23, 2003
- Studio: Headgear, New York
- Genre: Art punk; garage rock; alternative rock; indie rock
- Length: 2:01
- Label: Polydor
- Songwriters: Brian Chase; Karen Lee Orzolek; Nick Zinner
- Producers: David Andrew Sitek; Yeah Yeah Yeahs

Yeah Yeah Yeahs singles chronology
"Date with the Night" (2003)	"Pin" (2003)	"Maps" (2003)

Music video
- "Pin" on YouTube

"Pin" is a song by American indie rock band Yeah Yeah Yeahs from their debut studio album, Fever to Tell (2003). It was released in June 2003 by Polydor as the album's second single.

== Reception ==
Released on June 23, 2003, "Pin" reached number 34 on the Scottish Singles chart and number 29 on the UK singles chart. It was the second-most successful Fever to Tell single in Scotland and third-most in the United Kingdom.

"Pin" has received generally positive reviews from music critics. In her review of Fever to Tell, AllMusic's Heather Phares complimented the song's "bittersweet bounciness" and deemed it a highlight of the album. Conversely, Eric Carr of Pitchfork felt the song was "half-hearted" and conveyed "a fraction of the overwhelming force they have at their disposal."

== Music video ==
The music video for "Pin", directed by Tunde Adebimpe, was released in 2003. It is an animated stop motion video inspired by the Quay Brothers.

== Track listing ==
7"
No.	Title	Length
1.	"Pin"	1:59
2.	"Rich (Pandaworksforthecops Remix)"	4:37
3.	"Mr You're On Fire Mr"	2:55

== Personnel ==
- Brian Chase – drums
- Karen O – vocals
- Nick Zinner – guitars, drum machine

== Charts ==
Chart (2003)	Peak position
Scotland Singles (OCC)	34
UK Singles (OCC)	29

== Release history ==
Region	Date	Format(s)	Label(s)	Ref.
United Kingdom	June 23, 2003	7-inch vinyl; CD	Polydor; Dress Up	
