= Yeah Yeah Yeahs =

American indie rock band

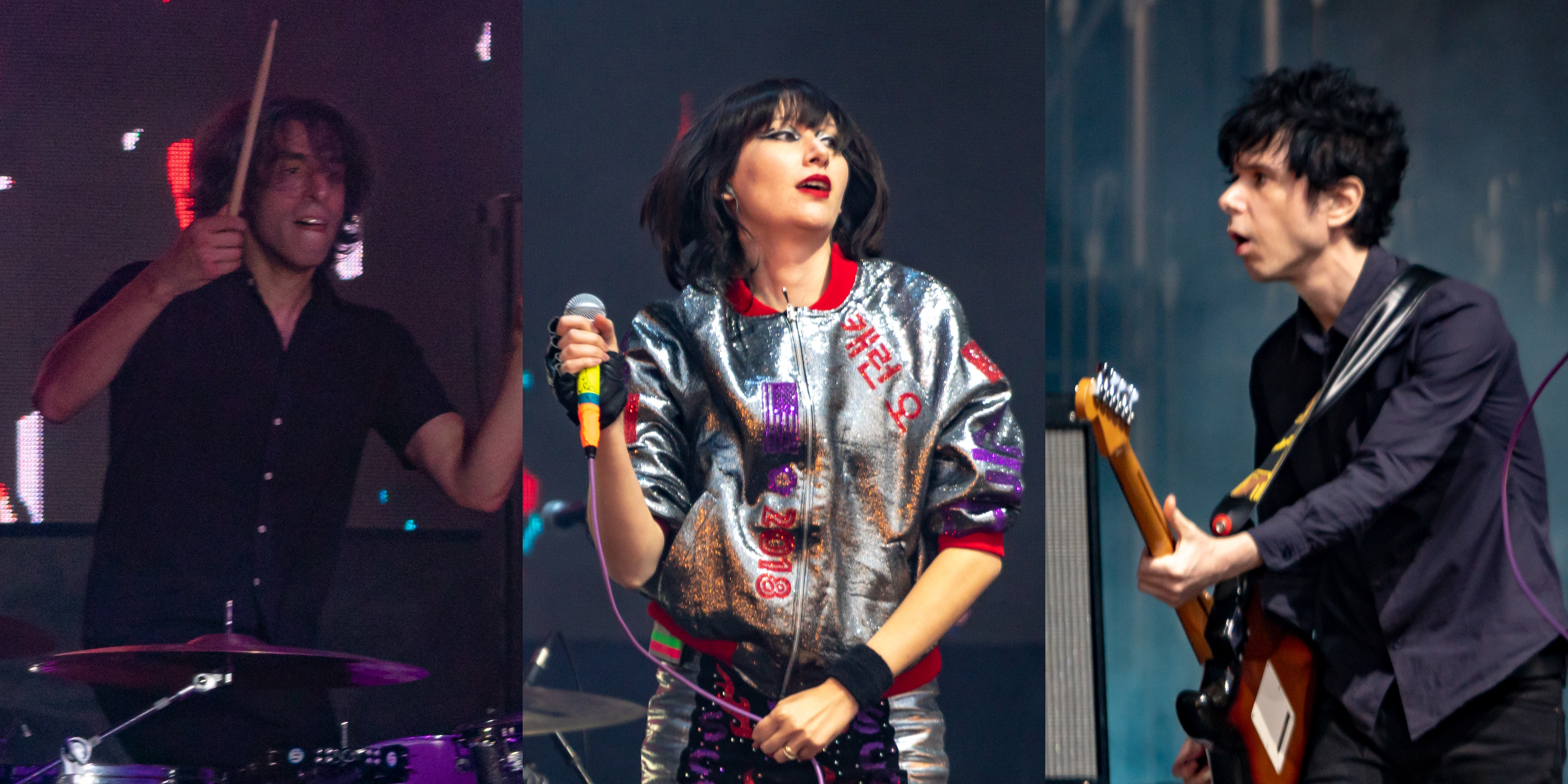
- L–R: Brian Chase, Karen O, and Nick Zinner performing in 2018

Background information
- Origin: New York City, U.S.
- Genres: Garage rock; post-punk; indie rock; art punk; dance-punk
- Works: Discography; songs
- Years active: 2000–2014; 2017–present
- Labels: Shifty; Wichita; Touch and Go; Interscope; Dress Up; Polydor; DGC; Secretly Canadian
- Awards: Full list
- Members: Karen O; Nick Zinner; Brian Chase
- Website: yeahyeahyeahs.com
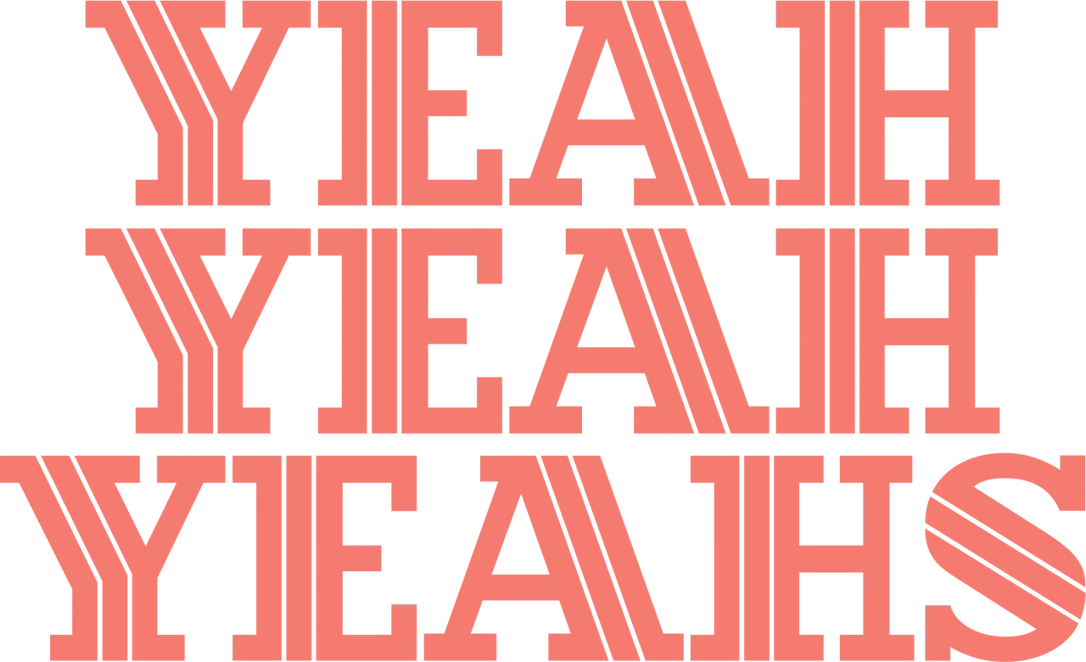

Yeah Yeah Yeahs (often abbreviated as YYYs) are an American indie rock band formed in New York City in 2000 by Karen O (vocals), Nick Zinner (guitars, keyboards), and Brian Chase (drums, percussion). They rose to fame during the 2000s garage rock and post-punk revivals, noted for their evolving musical style and energetic performances.

After earning positive reviews for their 2001 debut EP, Yeah Yeah Yeahs achieved commercial success with their acclaimed debut album, Fever to Tell (2003), placing them at the forefront of the 2000s rock revival. The album produced the single "Maps", which became their best-known song. Their next two albums, Show Your Bones (2006) and It's Blitz! (2009), drew further acclaim and produced the singles "Gold Lion" and "Heads Will Roll". Their fourth album, Mosquito (2013), earned lukewarm reviews but reached number five on the US Billboard 200. After a hiatus, their fifth album, Cool It Down (2022), marked a critical resurgence and produced the single "Spitting Off the Edge of the World".

Yeah Yeah Yeahs have received several accolades, including nominations for five Grammy Awards—four of which are for Best Alternative Music Album—and seven MTV Video Music Awards. Rolling Stone has Fever to Tell on their list of "500 Greatest Albums of All Time" and "Maps" on their "500 Greatest Songs of All Time"; the same publication ranked Karen O and Zinner among the greatest singers and guitarists in history, respectively.

== History ==
=== 2000–2003: Formation and Fever to Tell ===
"Bang"
A sample from "Bang", the opening track of the band's debut EP

In early 2000, singer/songwriter Karen Orzolek (professionally known as Karen O) and guitarist Nick Zinner founded the acoustic duo Unitard. Later that year, they changed their name to Yeah Yeah Yeahs and shifted towards a "trashy, punky, [and] grimy" sound inspired by the contemporary Ohio music scene. In September 2000, the band was invited to open for the White Stripes at the Mercury Lounge in Manhattan. As Karen O did not want to use a drum machine live, she enlisted drummer Brian Chase a day before the show. He became a permanent fixture of their lineup, making Yeah Yeah Yeahs a trio.

In late 2001, Yeah Yeah Yeahs hired Jerry Teel, a former guitarist for the punk rock band Boss Hog, to co-produce a demo intended to secure more shows. This ultimately developed into their self-titled debut EP, a decision that Zinner attributes to their desire to share their music. It was recorded and produced at Funhouse Recording Studio in New York, which doubled as their rehearsal space. They self-released the EP on their own label, Shifty, in July 2001. They gained significant media coverage after Albert Hammond Jr. of the Strokes wore a Yeah Yeah Yeahs pin while performing on Saturday Night Live, as well as a high-profile performance at South by Southwest, leading to the EP's reissue by Touch and Go Records in the United States and Wichita Recordings in the United Kingdom in 2002. Their first royalty payment from the latter label, who signed them after hearing "Bang", was $32. The EP topped the UK Indie Chart and, according to Nielsen SoundScan, has sold over 71,000 copies.

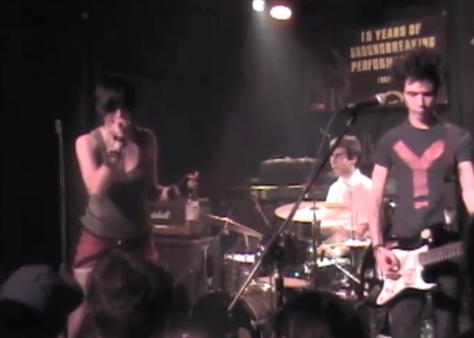
Yeah Yeah Yeahs performing in 2003

By the end of 2002, Yeah Yeah Yeahs's first record and live shows garnered them recognition. The band received offers from major record labels to finance and produce their debut album, Fever to Tell, but rejected them, as they felt it would compromise their creative control. They funded the album themselves and hired the then-unknown Dave Sitek (TV on the Radio) as a co-producer, his first of several collaborations with the band. They recorded the album at the local Headgear Studio in early 2002 and compiled unused material into Machine, their second EP, for promotion. Yeah Yeah Yeahs subsequently signed to Interscope Records at the insistence of Lee Ranaldo of Sonic Youth, which allowed them to maintain creative control. In contrast to their usual no-bass style, Zinner played bass in the studio recordings but went uncredited.

Fever to Tell was released in May 2003 and sold more than one million copies worldwide by 2009, propelling the band to international stardom. It reached number 55 on the US Billboard 200 and number 13 on the UK Albums Chart, and it was nominated for the Grammy Award for Best Alternative Music Album and the Shortlist Music Prize. Regarding their musical progression, NME wrote: "When they first arrived in Britain a year ago, it seemed likely they'd make a debut album fixated on the simple art of fucking. Instead, 'Fever to Tell' is more complicated: seeking to explain love, sex and the remarkable, brittle, sometimes disturbing connections between the two." Four singles were released from the album: "Date with the Night", "Pin", "Maps", and "Y Control"; the first three reached the top 30 of the UK singles chart. "Maps" became the band's signature song, peaking at number 87 on the Billboard Hot 100 and tripling the sales of Fever to Tell. The song's music video was played extensively on MTV, and it got nominated for four MTV Video Music Awards.

=== 2004–2006: Show Your Bones ===
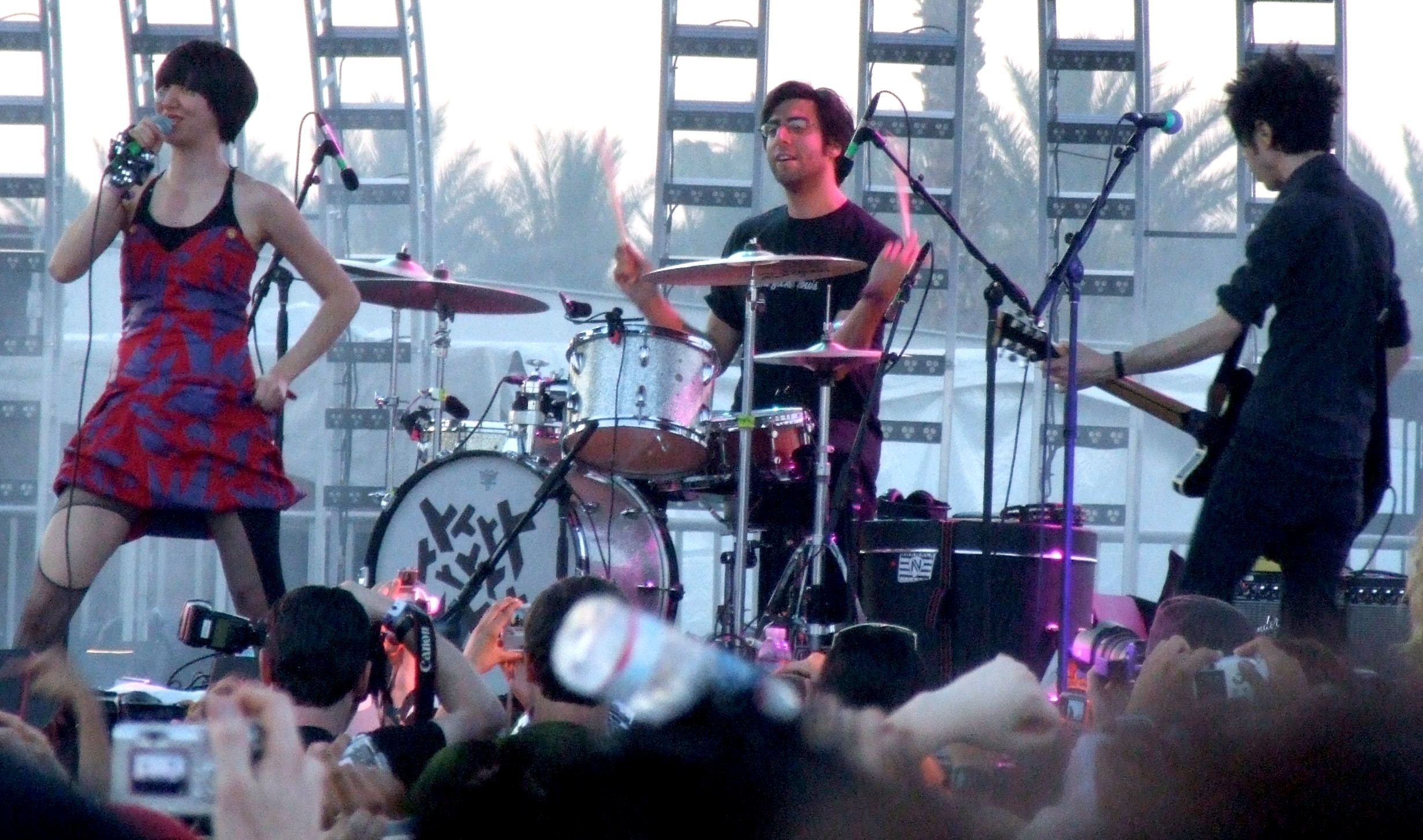
Yeah Yeah Yeahs performing at Coachella in 2006

In October 2004, Yeah Yeah Yeahs released their first DVD, Tell Me What Rockers to Swallow, which includes a concert filmed at the Fillmore in San Francisco, all of the band's music videos to date, and various interviews. In early 2005, they began work on their second album, Show Your Bones, with the goal of reinventing their sound and not creating "Fever to Tell part 2". Sitek returned to co-produce with the band and Sam Spiegel, better known as Squeak E. Clean. They faced various problems during production, including once scrapping and restarting the project, and tensions rising amongst the members due to the pressure. Karen O explained, "We just scared the shit out of each other, it was a dark and scary realm that we were going into – not that the music was dark and scary it was just totally different." Chase said that he did not understand the music until a month after they had finished the album. The final product was described by the band as "what happens when you put your finger in a light socket".

Show Your Bones was officially released in March 2006. It became the band's career-highest entry in the United Kingdom, at number seven, and it quadrupled the first-week sales of Fever to Tell in the United States. The press agreed that the band had successfully avoided a sophomore slump, though one critic thought their tensions showed in its music. It earned the band their second nomination for the Best Alternative Music Album Grammy. Three singles were released from the album: "Gold Lion", "Turn Into", and "Cheated Hearts". The first of these peaked at number 88 on the Billboard Hot 100. They toured in early 2006 in support of the record.

Yeah Yeah Yeahs joined All Tomorrow's Parties in 2006, a now-defunct organization from the United Kingdom that promoted independent music through their festivals. As major contributors to the festival, Yeah Yeah Yeahs were included in the 2009 documentary of the same name. Also in 2006, they released a live EP exclusive to iTunes. That same year, they joined BeatBullying's "Take a Stand" campaign to advocate against bullying and contributed a remix of "Cheated Hearts" to the charity album Give. Listen. Help. Volume 3, which aimed to raise awareness of breast cancer.

=== 2007–2009: It's Blitz! ===
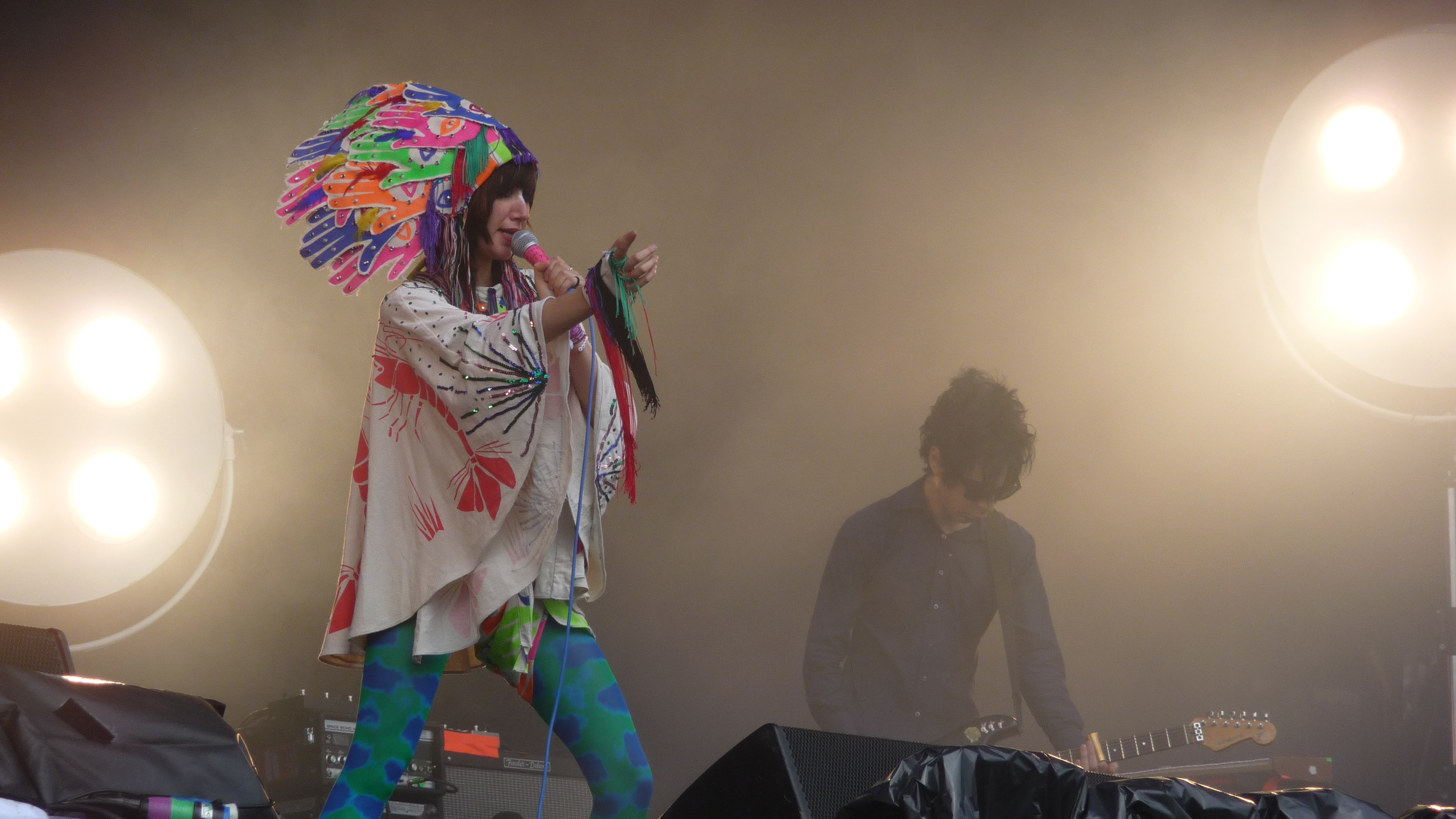
Yeah Yeah Yeahs performing at Glastonbury in 2009

Yeah Yeah Yeahs announced the release of a fourth EP, Is Is, in June 2007, composed of songs written between the production of Fever to Tell and Show Your Bones and produced by Nick Launay. In a statement on their website, the band wrote: "Summer nights are made for this shit. This shit IS IS made for summer nights." It was released in July 2007 and entered the US Billboard 200 at number 72. Only one single was released from the EP, "Down Boy". Also in 2007, the band contributed "Sealings" to the soundtrack of the superhero film Spider-Man 3.

In 2008, Yeah Yeah Yeahs began working on their third album, It's Blitz!. They wrote all the material during production, in contrast with the sessions for their first two albums. Launay, who returned as a co-producer with Sitek, remarked that he had not seen a band do so since 1979. The band reinvented themselves once more by shifting to dance-punk and pop rock, using pre-recorded samples of Chase's drums and making heavy use of an ARP synthesizer Zinner brought on a whim to one of five studios It's Blitz was recorded at. Several breaks were taken during production, to "get inspired". The album was slated for release in April 2009, but an internet leak of the material occurred in February, much to the band's dismay. The band embarked on an international tour to support the album in late 2009.

It's Blitz was ultimately released in March 2009 and doubled the sales of Show Your Bones in the United States alone. It received gold certifications in the United States, United Kingdom, and Australia—their most highly certified album to date, and netted their third nomination for the Best Alternative Music Album Grammy. Three singles were released from the album: "Zero", "Heads Will Roll", and "Skeletons", the second of which became the band's best-selling single to date, going double platinum in the United Kingdom and New Zealand. The song's music video was nominated for the MTV Video Music Award for Breakthrough Video. A remix by the Canadian artist A-Trak further heightened the song's popularity, and it was placed on Rolling Stone's list of "The 200 Greatest Dance Songs of All Time". The band also covered the Ramones's "Sheena Is a Punk Rocker" for War Child Presents Heroes (2009), a charity album whose funds provided aid to children in war-afflicted countries.

=== 2010–2013: Mosquito ===
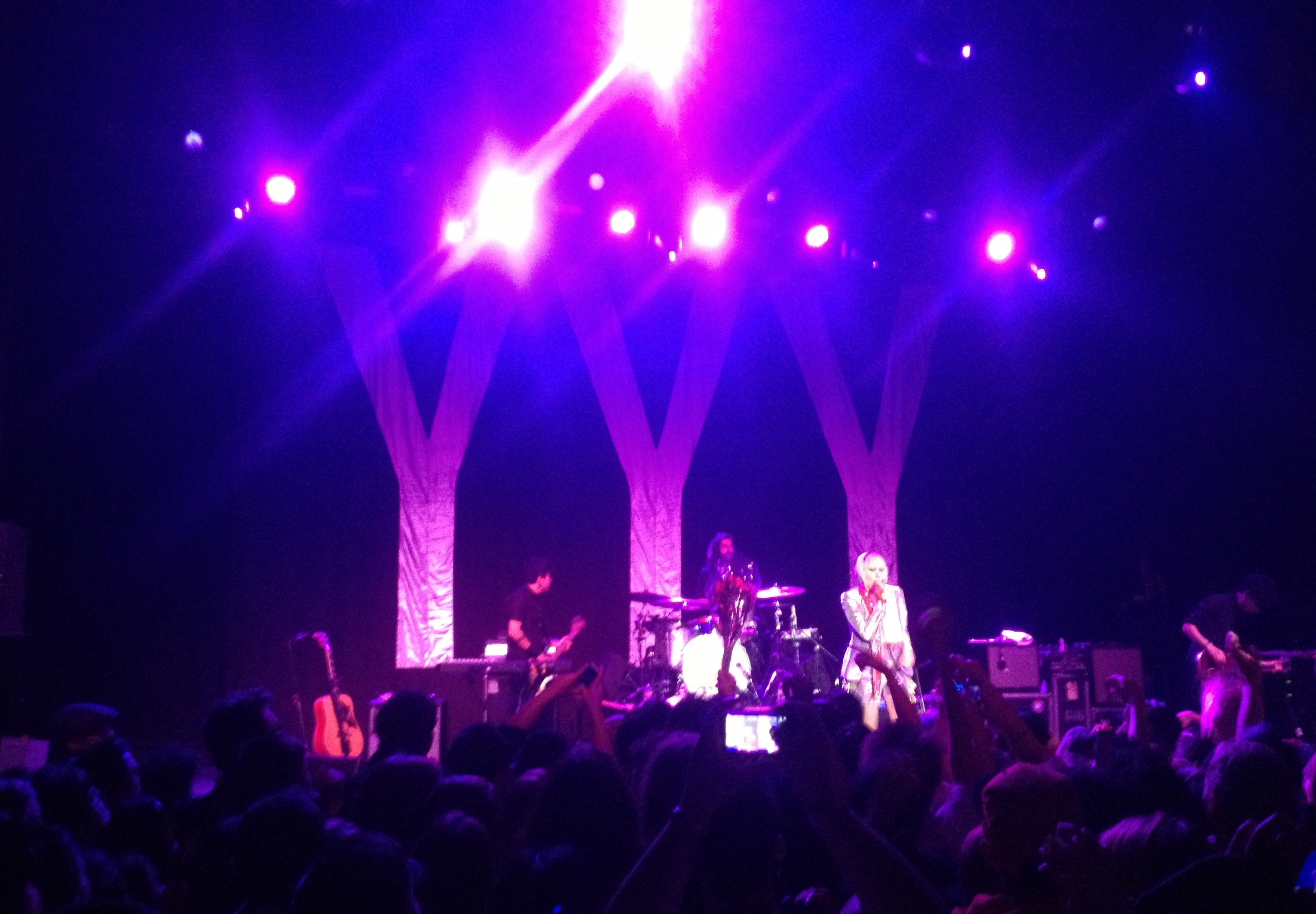
Yeah Yeah Yeahs performing at Ventura Theatre, California, in 2013

Yeah Yeah Yeahs headlined a fundraiser performance at the Museum of Modern Art in New York in 2010, which honored several philanthropists and raised funds for the museum. Following the It's Blitz! shows, the band began to work on new material. Their activity decreased in the next two years as the members worked on personal projects. Their following album, Mosquito, was produced during a turbulent time for the trio, who wrote and recorded the songs only when they felt inspired. Combining a return to their early sound with a "playful, lo-fi approach", Sitek and Launay returned to produce the album and were joined by James Murphy of LCD Soundsystem, who the band were previously interested in collaborating with. Karen O said Mosquito "was the rope ladder thrown down into the ditch for us to climb up and dust ourselves off".

In January 2013, Yeah Yeah Yeahs announced Mosquito, whose artwork by Beomsik Shimbe Shim attracted negative attention. After a series of promotional performances, the album was released in April 2013 and became their highest-charting effort in the United States to date, peaking at number five on the Billboard 200. In spite of chart success, some outlets felt the band had taken their first step backward. Two singles were issued: "Sacrilege" and "Despair", both of which were accompanied by music videos. The first won two UK Music Video Awards and nominations for two MTV Video Music Awards. "Despair" was shot on the top of the Empire State Building, making Yeah Yeah Yeahs the first band to ever film there. They toured worldwide in early 2013 to promote the album.

=== 2014–2021: Hiatus and concert focus ===
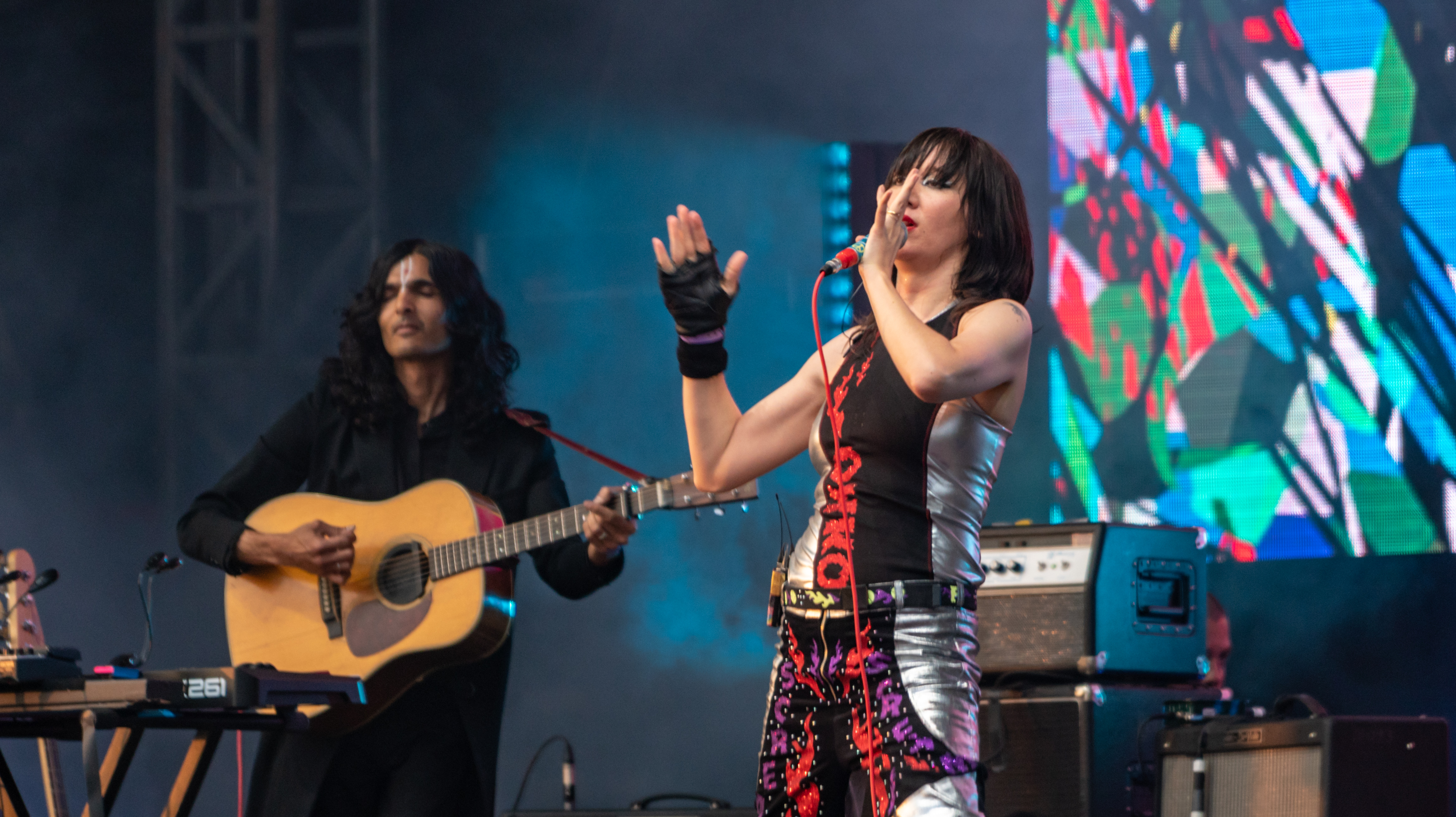
Yeah Yeah Yeahs performing at All Points East in 2018 with Imaad Wasif

In December 2014, Karen O told NME that the band had been "on a bit of a hiatus", citing a lack of inspiration and motivation. The members then focused on their solo careers. Chase continued his experimentation in music, working on the album series Drums and Drones from 2013 to 2018; Karen O became a mother and released her debut solo album, Crush Songs, in 2014; and Zinner opened a photography exhibit, "601 Photographs", in 2015; They briefly reunited for a one-off performance in 2016 for a Mick Rock documentary, playing with Money Mark and Jaleel Bunton of TV on the Radio. Also in 2016, they released a remix of "Under the Earth" from Mosquito to promote the water sanitation charity Drop in the Bucket. They announced their return by headlining Sound on Sound Fest with Iggy Pop and Grizzly Bear, their first concert in four years; the festival was ultimately cancelled.

In September 2017, Yeah Yeah Yeahs announced a reissue of Fever to Tell for its fifteenth anniversary, featuring previously unreleased demos and material from the era. It was published the following month alongside a short film, There Is No Modern Romance, which features both concert and offstage footage from their 2003 Fever to Tell tour. Retrospective analyses of the album from The Line of Best Fit and Uncut reaffirmed it as the band's defining work. To celebrate the reissue, the band performed a small series of shows that same year. In February 2018, the band recorded a Spotify-exclusive cover of Big Star's "Thirteen", their newest release in five years. They focused on live performances in the years afterwards. They aspired to create new music as early as 2020 but were halted by the COVID-19 pandemic, though they released a home recording of "Phenomena", a song from Show Your Bones. The band appeared on the charity album Good Music to Avert the Collapse of American Democracy, Volume 2 (2020), which advocated for suffrage.

=== 2022–present: Cool It Down ===
After a period of sporadic activity, Yeah Yeah Yeahs signed with the independent record label Secretly Canadian in May 2022 and announced new music and performances through their social media. Work began on their fifth album, Cool It Down, which was recorded at three different studios: Sonic Ranch in Texas, Federal Prism in California, and Zinner's basement. Sitek returned as a producer with Justin Raisen and Andrew Wyatt and co-wrote four of its eight songs. They donated $1 of every pre-order of Cool It Down towards ClientEarth as part of their activism against climate change.

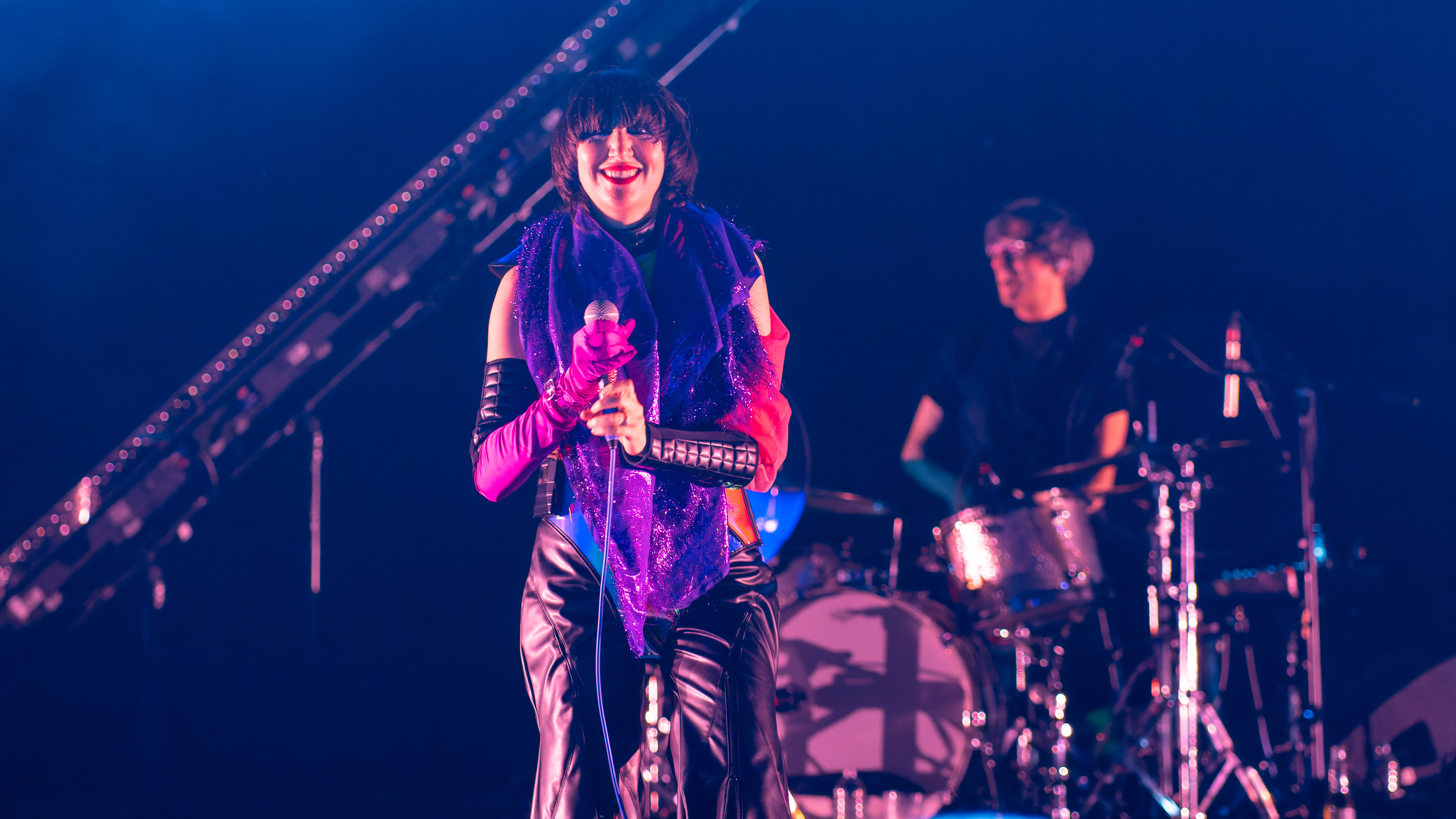
Yeah Yeah Yeahs performing at Brixton Academy, London, in 2022

Cool It Down came out in September 2022 and, after the mixed reception of Mosquito, marked a critical resurgence for the band. Reviewers thought it not only featured the band's most consistent work but Karen O's most refined songwriting yet. It received nominations for the Grammy Award for Best Alternative Music Album, the band's fourth in the category, and the Libera Award for Marketing Genius. Three singles were released digitally: "Spitting Off the Edge of the World", "Burning", and "Wolf". The first of these featured Perfume Genius and was nominated for the inaugural Grammy Award for Best Alternative Music Performance, while its music video (directed by Cody Critcheloe, designer of the Fever to Tell album art) was nominated for the Libera Award for Video of the Year. The song earned further recognition after appearing in The Gorge, topping two Billboard digital charts.

To promote Cool It Down, Yeah Yeah Yeahs played a small set of shows in mid 2022 and expanded it internationally in mid 2023. In 2025, Yeah Yeah Yeahs embarked on the Hidden in Pieces Tour, which aimed to "showcase the band's catalog reimagined in a captivating new light, performing in intimate theater settings across both North America and the UK." Reviewers lauded the vulnerability displayed through the softer renditions of their discography, and some thought it featured the band at their most innovative yet. A portion of proceeds from the tour was donated to ClientEarth. Recordings of their performance at London's Royal Albert Hall was compiled into their first live album, released on September 1, 2026.

== Artistry ==
Yeah Yeah Yeahs adopted their name from a New York City vernacular expression and often abbreviate it as YYYs. They do not have a bassist but have been supported by Imaad Wasif since 2006; David Pajo of Slint briefly played bass with the band in 2009. Their inspirations include musicians like John Zorn, Neil Young, and PJ Harvey, and bands such as the Birthday Party, Blonde Redhead, Blondie, ESG, Flux Information Sciences, Grateful Dead, the Greenhornes, Jonathan Fire*Eater, the Jon Spencer Blues Explosion, the Locust, Make-Up, Neutral Milk Hotel, Public Image Ltd, Ramones, Siouxsie and the Banshees, the Slits, Sonic Youth, and Van Halen.

Known for their musical reinventions, Yeah Yeah Yeahs began their career as an indie rock outfit with a garage rock/punk, art punk/rock, and post-punk sound and shifted to acoustic and dance-punk music in the late 2000s. Karen O writes most of the lyrics, while all three members contribute to the music. Karen O has said that "We still have to grab people by the collar ... We put out a record every three years now; we could easily be forgotten. If you look at a lot of our peers that we came up with, a lot of them have disappeared." A writer at NME summarized the band's evolving style: "With their no-holds-barred attitude to twisting indie-rock into warped new shapes, the Yeah Yeah Yeahs canon can feel like an impenetrable fortress – just as you get your head around one side of their coin, another appears."

An excerpt of Yeah Yeah Yeahs performing "Date with the Night" at Shepherd's Bush Empire, London, in 2009

A driving factor behind the band's image and success are their energetic live performances. In their early years, Yeah Yeah Yeahs had a reputation as otherwise-shy people who transformed onstage. By the mid-2000s, they were known for their exciting shows, highlighted by Karen O's unpredictable stage antics, which sometimes led to injuries. Though famous for this, the band prefers to perform shows in limited series as opposed to a typical concert tour. According to Karen O:

I mean that's why we don't do that many shows. If anybody's curious. It's hard to sustain. [...] I was injuring myself. I was drinking a lot while I was doing those shows. I was trying to numb parts of me because it was hard to process the immediate attention and fervor. It went from really lighthearted, playful, and celebratory to more angsty. It's been many years of learning how to harness this thing that feels much bigger than me, that flows through me when I'm performing. I've figured it out, more or less.

== Legacy ==
Yeah Yeah Yeahs were key figures of the 2000s garage rock and post-punk revivals, standing at the forefront of the New York music scene. Fever to Tell is considered a seminal work of the period, while "Maps" and "Heads Will Roll" are two of their most enduring tracks, having been covered, sampled, or remixed multiple times. The band have inspired acts like Cody Critcheloe, Grimes, Japanese Breakfast, and the Linda Lindas. Their role in the New York music scene is examined in the book Meet Me in the Bathroom and its 2022 film adaptation, both of which document the band's history and Karen O's struggles with sexualization and sensationalism.

During their rise to fame, Rolling Stone described the band as "the best thing to happen to punk rock". Billboard said they were one of the best bands of the garage rock revival and the most versatile of the period. The journalist Mark Beaumont noted their status as youth-culture icons and called them "marvellously [sic] photogenic and quotable", stating that they "captured the crosstown rush and post-punk cool of NYC even better than the Strokes". The Atlantic later dubbed them "the band that invented millennials", and American Songwriter credited them for introducing "the new millennium by forming what would become one of the most famous indie rock bands of all time". An editor for The New York Times wrote, "Yeah Yeah Yeahs came to define the resurgent New York rock scene of the aughts. The group evolved from its lo-fi roots, bringing in acoustic strumming, club beats and electro-pop weirdness, earning Grammy nominations along the way."

Rolling Stone rated Fever to Tell among the "500 Greatest Albums of All Time", "Maps" among the "500 Greatest Songs of All Time", Karen O among the "200 Greatest Singers of All Time", and Zinner among the "250 Greatest Guitarists of All Time". Additionally, Fever to Tell and It's Blitz! both appear in the book 1001 Albums You Must Hear Before You Die. NME also named Yeah Yeah Yeahs as one of the "100 Most Influential Artists".

== Achievements ==
Yeah Yeah Yeahs have sold over 1 million units in the United States and over 1.7 million units in the United Kingdom; the bulk of their sales in the UK comes from "Heads Will Roll", which was certified double-platinum. Each of their albums has entered the US Billboard 200, with Mosquito reaching the top five, Show Your Bones the top 20, and It's Blitz the top 30, as well as the UK Albums Chart, with all but Fever to Tell making the top 10. They have amassed two Billboard Hot 100 entries, five Billboard Alternative Airplay entries, and 10 UK singles chart entries.

Yeah Yeah Yeahs have received four nominations for the Grammy Award for Best Alternative Music Album for Fever to Tell, Show Your Bones, It's Blitz!, and Cool It Down; the first was also nominated for the Shortlist Music Prize. Their singles "Maps", "Heads Will Roll", and "Sacrilege" have collectively received seven nominations at the MTV Video Music Awards, and "Spitting Off the Edge of the World" was nominated for the Grammy Award for Best Alternative Music Performance.

== Band members ==
- Karen O – vocals, keyboards
- Nick Zinner – guitars, keyboards
- Brian Chase – drums, percussion

Current touring musicians

- Imaad Wasif – bass, keyboards, guitars (2006–2009, 2010–2014, 2017–present)

Former touring musicians

- David Pajo – bass (2009–2010)

== Discography ==
Studio albums

- Fever to Tell (2003)
- Show Your Bones (2006)
- It's Blitz! (2009)
- Mosquito (2013)
- Cool It Down (2022)

== Tours ==
Headlining

- Fever to Tell Tour (2002–2003)
- Show Your Bones Tour (2006)
- It's Blitz! Tour (2009)
- Mosquito Tour (2013)
- Cool It Down Tour (2022–2023)
- Hidden in Pieces Tour (2025)
