= Colin Self (composer) =

American artist, composer and choreographer

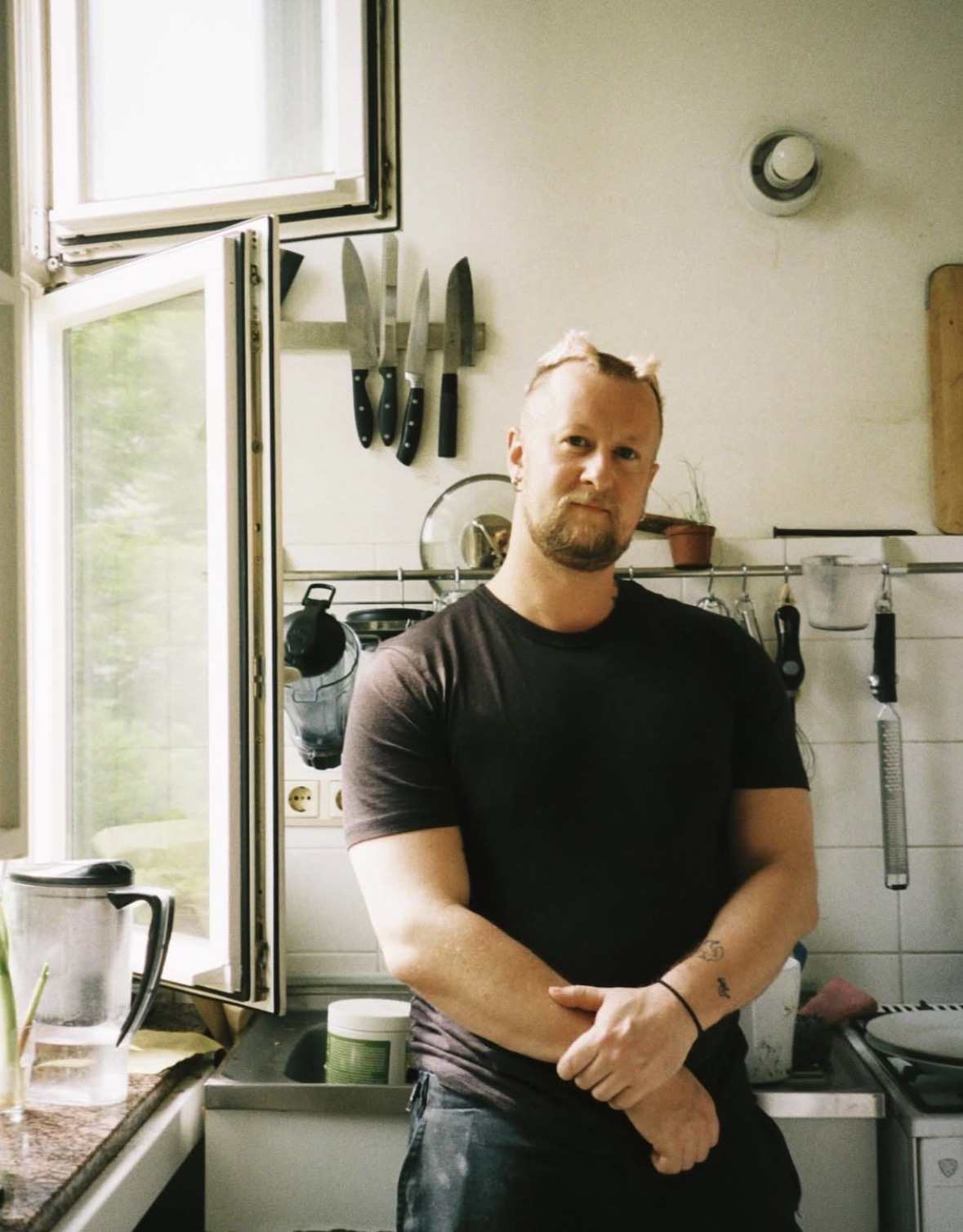
- Colin Self in 2025.
- Born: 1987 (age 38–39)
- Website: colin-self.com

Colin Self (born 1987) is an American artist, composer, and choreographer. Their work centers around ideas of gender, communication, and consciousness, and their practice includes social relationships and digital technologies. They gained attention as a member of the avant-drag collective Chez Deep 2012–2014 performing in New York City, Miami, and Glasgow with members Alexis Penney, Bailey Stiles, Hari Nef, and Sam Banks. They are a member of the electronic music trio Holly Herndon, which supported Radiohead on their 2016 European tour.

== Biography ==
Self was born in Aloha, Oregon. They studied puppetry and experimental writing at Evergreen State College in Olympia, Washington from 2006 to 2008. They transferred to the School of Art Institute of Chicago and completed their BFA in 2010. Soon after, Self relocated to New York where they began performing regularly as a solo artist and in groups like Chez Deep, 2 Pretty, and the #HDBoyz. Self started a monthly alternative queer party Clump, which raised money for a biannual microgrant the Radical Diva Grant and which featured DJs, performances, and readings, with artists like Umfang, Mykki Blanco, and Andrea Crespo. Since 2014, Self has performed as part of an electronic music trio with Holly Herndon and Mat Dryhurst. They graduated from Bard College's Milton Avery Graduate School of the Arts in Hudson, New York studying music and sound in 2017. In 2018, Self premiered Siblings (Elation VI), the final opera of "The Elation Series" at MoMA PS1 which corresponded with the release of Siblings on RVNG Intl. in November 2018.

== Work ==
Self's work reflects in different ways the themes of community, kinship, and caring. Self co-wrote the experimental opera The Fool with artist Raul de Nieves, which premiered at ISSUE Project Room in 2014 and restaged at The Kitchen in 2017 with a chorus of 22 voices. The project grew out of a community choir Self had been hosting in their home which invited anyone to come sing, motivated by the idea that the voice can be a tool to incite social transformation. They often frames their work as a form of activism, responding to social crises and systems of control. They were one of several choreographers who collaborated to create the 150-person immersive performance Authority Figure at The Knockdown Center in Queens, New York in 2016, a work which thematized obedience, surveillance and policing. Self's experimental theatre work SIBLINGS, which premiered at Donaufestival in Austria in 2017, mixes opera and revue, choreographing five performers to explore themes of alienation and empathy.

== Selected discography ==
- Colin Self, Orphans (2019)
- Colin Self, Siblings (2018)
- Colin Self, Elation (2015)
- Holly Herndon, Unequal (2015)

== Selected performances ==
- Donaufestival, Krems an der Donau, Austria (2017)
- The Kitchen, New York, NY (2017)
- PS1 MoMA, Queens, NY (2016)
- The Knockdown Center, Queens, NY (2016)
- Opera Forward Festival, Dutch National Opera & Ballet, Amsterdam, NL (2016)
- Hebbel am Ufer, Berlin (2015)
- Time Zones Festival, Bari, Italy (2015)
- BOFFO Performance Festival, Fire Island, NY (2015)
- Museum of Art & Design, New York NY (2015)
- Pennsylvania State BIOCODE Conference, Philadelphia, PA (2015)
- The Hammer Museum, Los Angeles, CA (2014)
- Rhode Island School of Design, Providence, RI (2014)
- Issue Project Room, New York, NY (2014)
- OMCA, Oakland, CA (2014)
- VOX POPULI at AUX, Philadelphia, PA (2014)
- White Columns for The White Columns Annual, New York NY (2014)
- REDCAT Theater for Outfest, Los Angeles, CA (2013)
- Dixon Place for PS122's COIL festival, New York, NY (2013)
- Defibrillator Gallery, Chicago, IL (2012)
- Gallery 400, University of Illinois, Chicago, IL (2012)
