= Raúl de Nieves =

Artist

- Born: 1983 (age 41–42); Michoacán, Mexico
- Known for: Sculpture, Performance Art

Raul de Nieves (born 1983, Michoacán, Mexico) is a multimedia artist, performer, and musician. He lives and works in Brooklyn, New York.

== Early life ==
De Nieves grew up in Michoacán, Mexico. His father died when de Nieves was two. Several years later, de Nieves and his family emigrated to San Diego, CA. At 20, de Nieves was accepted to the California College of the Arts, but decided against paying the tuition fees and instead moved to San Francisco's Mission District. He worked at an antiques shop called Gypsy Honeymoon and soon met fellow artist and sculptor Stewart Uoo.

== Work ==
De Nieve's showed first series of paintings, St George and the Dragon (2003–05), in 2005 at the back room of the Gypsy Honeymoon.

The following year, de Nieves moved to New York and exhibited new sculptures, shoes, at Newman Popiashvili.

In 2014, he completed his first life-sized work, Day(ves) of Wonder, which returned the artist back to his performance roots in Mexican textiles and Bushwick drag.

Later that year, De Nieves and composer Colin Self staged The Fool which was an hour-long opera comprising a 15-member chorus, four soloists, and an instrumental quintet. The performance took place at Issue Project Room and De Nieves created two giant, gem encrusted doors for the performance that portrayed the tarot card, The Fool.

For the 2017 Whitney Biennial, de Nieves was commissioned to make a stained-glass window titled, Beginning & the end neither & the otherwise betwixt & between the end is the beginning & the end (2017).

In 2018, in partnership with Art Production Fund and Bvlgari, de Nieves completed his first public art installation, a carousel called, When I Look in to Your Eyes I See the Sun. Various mythological beasts and anthropomorphic humans and jester-like creatures adorn the carousel. The work was displayed at The Faena Hotel in Miami Beach during the 2018 iteration of Art Basel Miami Beach.

De Nieves had his first museum show, Eternal Return & The Obsidian Heart, at the Museum of Contemporary Art North Miami in 2020.

In 2021, de Nieves was awarded the Joan Mitchell Fellowship from the Joan Mitchell Foundation.

Raúl de Nieves uses religious poems and folk tales with fictional legends in his work, which are taken from Mexican literal roots and are therefore very useful in visual work.

=== Influences ===
De Nieves' art practice investigates notions of transformation, beauty, the human body, sexuality, and history. De Nieves references the visual symbolism of both Catholic and Mexican art in creating own visual mythology. Nieves' references also include diverse theatrical traditions including circus, religious processionals, and Kabuki theater. De Nieves has been a vital figure of queer nightlife in New York for the past decade.

=== Selected Exhibition History ===
- ICA Boston July 22, 2020 – January 3, 2021
- Fina - Cleveland Museum of Art - February - April 2019
- 2017 Whitney Biennial curated by Jane Panetta and Rujeko Hockley

=== Public Collections ===
- Whitney Museum of American Art, New York, NY
- Museum of Contemporary Art, Los Angeles, CA

== Performance history ==
De Nieves has performed at Documenta 14, Performa 13, MoMA PS1, ICA Philadelphia, The Watermill Center, The Kitchen, Artist's Space, and numerous other venues.

== Brand collaborations ==
Raul de Nieves has collaborated with many brands including Tiffany's, Bvlgari, Swarovski, Missoni, and Hermès.
