= Yeah Yeah Yeahs (EP) =

EP by Yeah Yeah Yeahs
- Released: July 9, 2001
- Genres: Alternative rock; art punk; garage rock; indie rock
- Length: 13:52
- Labels: Shifty; Wichita; Touch and Go
- Producers: Jerry Teel; Yeah Yeah Yeahs

Yeah Yeah Yeahs chronology
Yeah Yeah Yeahs (2001)	Machine (2002)

Yeah Yeah Yeahs is the debut extended play (EP) by the American indie rock band Yeah Yeah Yeahs. It was self-released on July 9, 2001, and reissued in 2002 by Wichita in the United Kingdom and Touch and Go in the United States. It was recorded as a demo over two days in early 2001 with producer Jerry Teel, and developed into their debut EP in an effort to land more shows. Yeah Yeah Yeahs features the band's early garage rock and art punk influences, and lead singer and lyricist Karen O's themes of romance and sex.

Yeah Yeah Yeahs topped the UK Indie Chart and had sold over 71,000 copies by the end of the decade. It was praised by critics for its unique sound and Karen O's performances, and named among the best releases of 2002 by The New York Times and NME. In 2024, Paste placed it among the 100 greatest EPs of all time.

== Background and recording ==
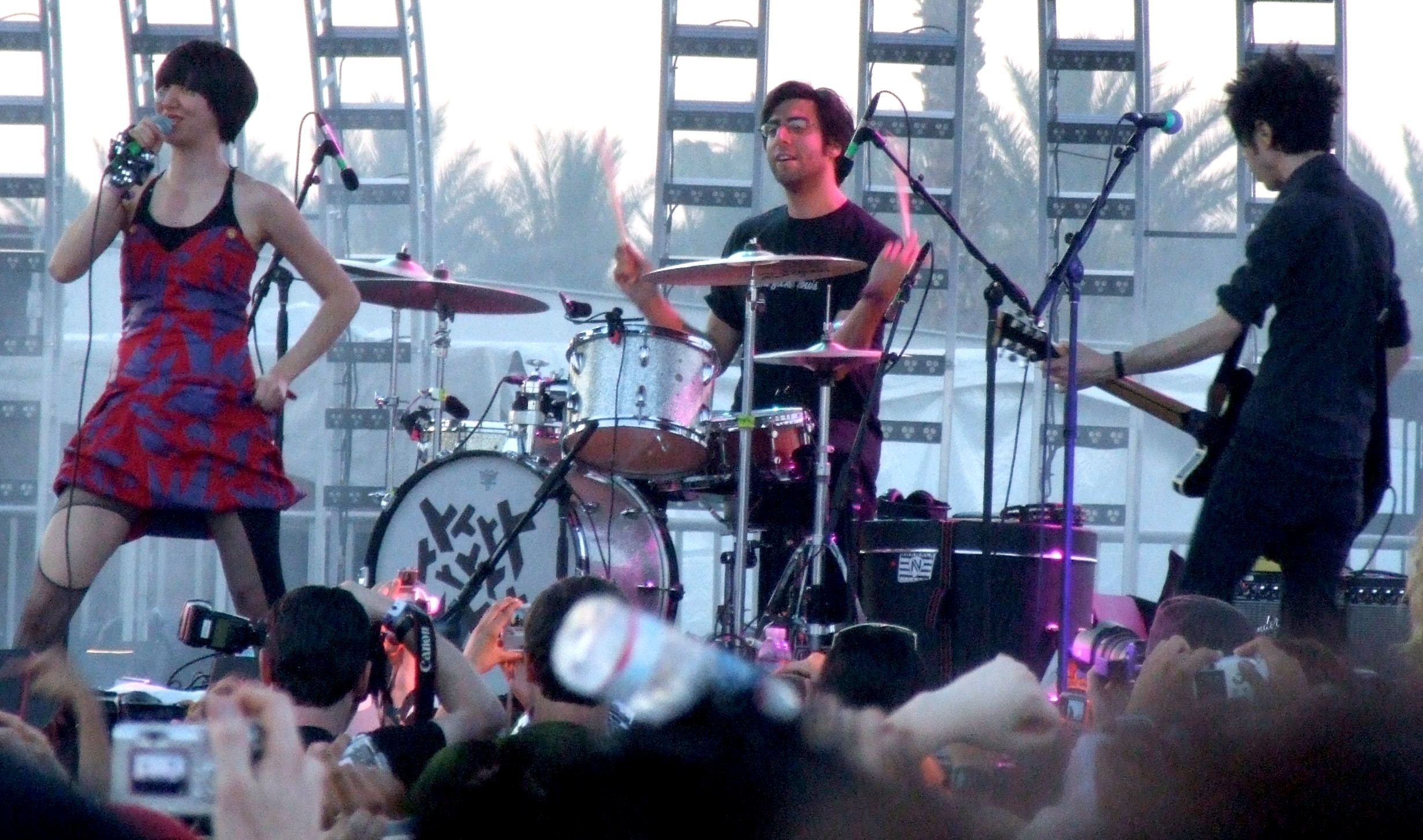
Yeah Yeah Yeahs performing at Coachella in 2006. From left to right: Karen O, Brian Chase and Nick Zinner.

In 2000, singer/songwriter Karen O and guitarist Nick Zinner formed the duo Unitard. They changed their name that year to Yeah Yeah Yeahs and added drummer Brian Chase to the lineup, forming a trio and earning a following for their live performances. They enlisted Jerry Teel, a former guitarist for the punk rock band Boss Hog, to co-produce a demo that was developed into their debut EP. Zinner explained in an interview that "Our first EP was recorded as a demo, so we could get shows at cool clubs opening up for bigger bands. That was literally our aspiration."

The Yeah Yeah Yeahs EP was recorded across two days with Teel at Avenue B's Funhouse Recording Studio in New York City, which doubled as their rehearsal space. It was mastered by Chuck Scott at Soundoptik in the same city. The artwork and packaging were designed by the band and Crispin. The front cover contains a close-up of Karen O, while the back cover features three different self-photographs of her, Zinner and Chase. The EP has been mislabeled as Master, owing to the nameplate necklace engraved with the word which Karen O wears on the cover, or as Bang, after the title of its opening track.

== Music and lyrics ==
Karen O wrote the lyrics for the EP's five tracks, while the band co-wrote the music. They aimed to capture the "trashy, punky, [and] grimy" sound they observed in the contemporary Ohio music scene, and the "cocky attitude" they had while performing. Karen O's staccato vocals became a focal point of the EP, though she described her singing as sounding "really, really, really sloshed." The band was influenced by the dance-punk band ESG, whose sound they attempted to recreate "with guitar instead of bass." Other influences were the rock bands Jon Spencer Blues Explosion and Jonathan Fire*Eater, and the musicians PJ Harvey, and John Zorn.

"Bang"
Sample of "Bang" with the repeated lyric "As a fuck, son, you sucked!", beginning a few seconds before the first chorus.

The opening track, "Bang", was inspired by Karen O's sexual dissatisfaction with a former boyfriend, emphasized by the repeated lyric "As a fuck, son, you sucked!" "Mystery Girl" was co-written with guitarist Jack Martin and depicts a sexually promiscuous woman. The lyrics of the critically praised "Art Star" satirize jet-set culture and the art world. It features a spoken word introduction and screaming vocals. "Miles Away" concerns a woman who, as said in the song, has "hurt fewer people in a better world". The closing track, "Our Time", was originally titled "Year to Be Hated" and one of the first songs Karen O ever wrote. It is an anthem about a nearly failed romance, which resonated with New Yorkers after the September 11 attacks.

== Release ==
The band self-released Yeah Yeah Yeahs on July 9, 2001, through their Shifty label. They did not intend for any success, though they gained some exposure later that year after Albert Hammond Jr. of the Strokes wore their pin during a performance on Saturday Night Live. Wichita Recordings co-founder Mark Bowen was impressed after hearing "Bang", and was surprised to see that the band had yet to sign with a record label. According to Bowen, "We flew to America and saw them play fourth on the bill to Arab on Radar; Karen O was already a superstar in every way." He then offered them distribution of the EP in the United Kingdom in 2002. Touch and Go Records reissued it in the United States in July 2002, after seeing a high-profile concert at South by Southwest earlier that year.

== Reception ==
Professional ratings
Review scores
Source	Rating
AllMusic	4/5 stars
Blender	4/5 stars
Pitchfork	7.0/10
Rolling Stone	3/5 stars
The Rolling Stone Album Guide	4/5 stars
Stylus	C+

Yeah Yeah Yeahs was received favorably and became a sleeper hit, selling over 71,000 copies in the United States by the end of the decade. It topped the UK Indie Chart, and reached number nine on the Australia Hitseekers Chart, number seven on the Danish Singles Chart, and number 56 on the Swedish Singles Chart. Both The New York Times and NME placed the EP among the best releases of 2002, with NME awarding it second-best, while The Village Voice placed it at number 40 on their Pazz & Jop poll.

Critics generally praised the EP's sound; AllMusic described it as one of the most innovative releases of the 2000s garage rock revival at the time, and journalist Everett True wrote that it captured the spirit of rock n' roll. Karen O's performances were especially praised, with Blender calling her "divine" and Rolling Stone describing her as the "Joanest Jett in town". Some critics noted that its low-fi style and production limited its commercial potential, while a Stylus writer described three of its five tracks as "unremarkable". Pitchfork noted early skepticism surrounding the garage rock movement but concluded that the EP demonstrated a "sharp survey" of the band's capabilities.

In the 2004 edition of The Rolling Stone Album Guide, the critic Sasha Frere-Jones awarded the EP four stars, writing that the band "instantly made their case for good-old-fashioned attitude"; the EP scored higher than their acclaimed debut album, Fever to Tell. In 2016, Under the Radar said it was one of 2001's best albums and essential to both the band's success and the contemporary New York music scene. In 2024, Paste placed it at number 42 on their list of the "100 Greatest EPs of All Time", writing that it bested the early works of contemporary bands the Strokes and Interpol.

== Track listing ==
All tracks are written by Yeah Yeah Yeahs, except "Mystery Girl", written by Yeah Yeah Yeahs and Jack Martin.

Yeah Yeah Yeahs track listing
No.	Title	Length
1.	"Bang"	3:09
2.	"Mystery Girl"	2:57
3.	"Art Star"	2:00
4.	"Miles Away"	2:20
5.	"Our Time"	3:23
Total length:		13:52

== Personnel ==
Credits are adapted from the liner notes of Yeah Yeah Yeahs.

Yeah Yeah Yeahs

- Karen O – vocals, production, artwork
- Nick Zinner – guitars, production, artwork
- Brian Chase – drums, production, artwork

Additional personnel

- Jerry Teel – engineering, production
- Chuck Scott – mastering
- Crispin – artwork

== Charts ==
Chart performance for Yeah Yeah Yeahs
Chart (2001–2007)	Peak position
Australia Hitseekers (ARIA)	9
Danish Singles (Tracklisten)	7
Swedish Singles (Hitlistan)	56
UK Indie Chart (OCC)	1
