= Ssion =

American singer and audiovisual artist

SSION (Cody Critcheloe)
- Ssion performing in Chicago, 2014.

Background information
- Origin: Kansas City, Missouri, United States
- Genres: Queercore, Punk, Pop, Indie Rock
- Occupations: Musician, Video directing, Painting
- Years active: 2002–current
- Website: ssion.com

Cody Critcheloe, formerly known as SSION (pronounced shun), is a multifaceted audiovisual artist embodying video directing, music production, live performance, and painting. The artist has released several records and has collaborated with Róisín Murphy, Sky Ferreira, Ariel Pink, and Hood By Air. His recent venture as an award-nominated music video director includes working on videos for Robyn, Perfume Genius, Yves Tumor, Santigold, and Katseye, and has exhibited artwork internationally. SSION is used as a moniker for Critcheloe's multimedia practice and was retired in the early 2020s. He lives and works in Los Angeles, California.

== Early life and education ==
Critcheloe was born and raised in Lewisport, Kentucky. His mother was a draftsman and his father worked as a maintenance manager at a paper mill. In high school, Critcheloe formed a punk rock band named SSION and released albums under this moniker until their last studio album, O, in 2018.

After high school, the artist relocated to Kansas City, Missouri for college, where he studied fine art at the Kansas City Art Institute and graduated with a BFA. SSION was resurrected alongside three other visual artists.

The artist's visual practice continued. He created album artwork for the Yeah Yeah Yeahs's "Fever to Tell" and music videos for the likes of Liars and Peaches along with stop-motion animated videos for SSION's music.

== Music ==
In 2003, SSION released the EP Minor Treat and the album Opportunity Bless My Soul.

SSION released their second album, Fools Gold, accompanied with a remix EP Clown, in 2008. The album achieved critical success and straddles several genres like disco, house, and electro-punk. SSION's voice has been linked to late-1990s incarnation of Royal Trux's Neil Hagerty and Darby Crash. On Pitchfork, critic Eric Harvey writes:

"Ssion's tendency to weave sympathy and encouragement through the naughty bits-- erasing the boring distinctions between partying, sex, music, and boundless, delirious dreaming-- clearly aligns them with CSS, Scissor Sisters, and Junior Senior, their fellow purveyors of devilishly simple, self-reflexive, and undeniably catchy dance-pop."

In 2010, Critcheloe moved to New York where he met a new set of collaborators including Mykki Blanco, Colin Self, Shayne Oliver, Raul de Nieves and Nick Weiss of Teengirl Fantasy and performed at Secret Project Robot and GHE20GOTH1K.

In 2011, SSION self-released the electropop and disco-influenced, Bent, his third album. It was eventually re-released in 2012. The release of the album coincided with a 3-day performance at MoMA PS1 with Sky Ferreira, Mykki Blanco, Colin Self and Casey Spooner.

Ssion's fourth studio album, O, was released in May 2018 after a seven year hiatus. The album was produced by Sam Mehran of Test Icicles and Nick Weiss of Teengirl Fantasy. The album features cameos from Róisín Murphy, Devendra Banhart, Jennifer Herrema of Royal Trux, Sky Ferreira, Ian Isiah, and Ariel Pink. Contributing writer Cameron Cook at Pitchfork notes:

"In 2018, so many new artists are embracing their queer identities and heritage, but Critcheloe has spent about 20 years honing Ssion's droll, campy, dramatic aesthetic—and that work has paid off in their strongest and most timely album yet. "O" is the sound of the zeitgeist catching up with Ssion, not the other way around."

== Video directing ==
Critcheloe is primarily a music video director and has directed videos for internationally recognized and award winning singers like Kylie Minogue, Robyn, Peaches, Santigold, Perfume Genius, Liars, Grizzly Bear, and CSS among others.

The artist's first feature film, Boy, was released in 2009 and funded by Grand Arts, a non-profit arts organization from Kansas City, MO. The film was showcased alongside artwork and installations in tandem with Peres Project in LA and Berlin, The Smart Museum in Chicago, and The Hole Gallery in New York City. Boy is made up of music videos strung together to produce what Critcheloe jokingly calls "the gay punk rock equivalent to Forrest Gump."

In 2020, SSION directed the music video for Yves Tumor's Kerosene! featuring Tumor, Diana Gordon, Bailey Stiles and Chris Greatti in a Cronenberg-inspired drama. Later that year, Critcheloe directed a Versace Christmas advertisement special called All for You starring comedian Jordan Firstman and Donatella Versace.

The LA-based pop star group, Katsye, have worked with Critcheloe on several music videos, including "Gnarly," "Animals," and "Touch."

Critcheloe lists Pedro Almodovar, Andy Kaufman, Bob Fosse, Franco Moschino, Beck, Federico Fellini, Jean-Baptiste Mondino, and Bruce La Bruce as influences.

== Visual art and paintings ==
Critcheloe has been drawing and painting since childhood. His paintings typically reach for punk and Hollywood entertainment business lowbrow iconography and logomania.

In 2020, SSION exhibited a new series of painting in the exhibition titled Chips, the artist's first painting exhibition since the 2000's. Chips cataloged in storyboard-form painted photographs and stills from both completed and unrealized videos directed by the artist. In addition to the artist's own visuals, he included stills from VHS-era source material like David Cronenberg's Crash, Pedro Almodóvar's La Ley Del Deseo, and the American television show Seinfeld. The exhibition included 37 paintings hung salon-style at The Gallery @. Author and critic Natasha Stagg writes that Critcheloe's paintings merge abstraction with melodrama and punk rock, blurring the lines between figurative identity and symbolic idolatry.

== Discography ==
Title	Release type	Label	Release history
Fucked into Oblivion	Cassette	Self-released	1999
I Don't Want New Wave & I Don't Want the Truth	CD-R	Self-released	2001
Minor Treat	EP	Version City Records	2003
Opportunity Bless My Soul	Album	Version City Records	2003
World's Worth	Album	Sound Virus Records	2005
Glory Wound	CD-R	Self-released	2005
Street Jizz	EP	Self-released	2006
Fools Gold	Album	Sleazetone Records	2007
Clown	Single & Remixes	Sleazetone Records	2007
Street Jizz	Single & Remixes	Sleazetone Records	2008
Ah Ma	Remixes EP	Sleazetone Records	2009
Bent	Album	Dovecote Records	2011
Pink Christmas with Hunx and His Punx and Samantha Urbani			2014
O	Album	Dero Arcade	2018

== Video productions ==
=== Video direction ===
- 2005 – Liars, "There's Always Room on the Broom", music video director
- 2008 – Tilly and the Wall, "Beat Control", music video director
- 2009 – Gossip, Music for Men, infomercial director
- 2010 – Gossip, Men in Love, music video director
- 2010 – Peaches, "Billionaire", music video director
- 2011 – Santigold, "Big Mouth", music video director
- 2011 – MNDR, "#1 in Heaven", music video director
- 2014 – Dum Dum Girls, "Lost Boys and Girls Club", music video director
- 2014 – Kylie Minogue, "Sexercize", music video director
- 2014 – Perfume Genius, "Queen", music video director
- 2015 – Robyn, "Love is Free", music video director
- 2015 – Lower Dens, "To Die in L.A.", music video director
- 2015 – Brooke Candy, "Renegade", music video director
- 2015 – Mykki Blanco, "No Leash", music video director
- 2018 – Robyn, "Between the Lines", music video director
- 2018 – King Princess, "Prophet", music video director
- 2019 – Allie X, "Fresh Laundry", music video director
- 2019 – Allie X, "Regulars", music video director
- 2019 – King Princess, "Ohio", music video director
- 2020 – Yves Tumor, "Kerosene", music video director
- 2020 – Versace X Vogue "All for You", music video director
- 2022 – Yeah Yeah Yeahs featuring Perfume Genius, "Spitting Off the Edge of the World", music video director
- 2022 – Demi Lovato, "Substance", music video director
- 2023 – Yves Tumor, "Heaven Surrounds Us Like a Hood", music video director
- 2023 – Gossip, Crazy Again, video director
- 2024 – Katseye, "Touch", music video director
- 2025 – Perfume Genius, "It's a Mirror", music video director

=== Self-directed videos for SSION ===
- 2006 – SSION, "Street Jizz", music video director
- 2007 – SSION, "ASAP", music video director
- 2008 – SSION, "Ah Ma", music video director
- 2008 – SSION, "A Wolves Eye", music video director
- 2008 – SSION, "Credit in the Straight World", music video director
- 2008 – SSION, "Warm Glove", music video director
- 2009 – SSION, Bullshit, music video director
- 2010 – SSION, "Clown", music video director
- 2012 – SSION, "My Love Grows in the Dark", music video director
- 2012 – SSION, "Earthquake", music video director
- 2012 – SSION, "Feel Good (4-Evr)", music video director
- 2012 – SSION, "Psy-chic", music video director
- 2013 – SSION, "Luvvbazaar", music video director
- 2013 – SSION, "High", music video director
- 2018 – SSION, "Comeback", director
- 2018 – SSION, "At Least The Sky Is Blue", director
- 2018 – SSION, "Heaven is My Thing Again", director
- 2018 – SSION, "Inherit", director
