= Fever to Tell =

Studio album by Yeah Yeah Yeahs
- Released: April 28, 2003
- Studio: Headgear (New York)
- Genres: Alternative rock; art punk; garage rock; indie rock
- Length: 37:25
- Labels: Polydor; Interscope
- Producers: David Andrew Sitek; Yeah Yeah Yeahs

Yeah Yeah Yeahs chronology
Machine (2002)	Fever to Tell (2003)	Show Your Bones (2006)

Singles from Fever to Tell
- 1. "Date with the Night" Released: April 14, 2003; 2. "Pin" Released: June 23, 2003; 3. "Maps" Released: September 22, 2003; 4. "Y Control" Released: June 1, 2004

Fever to Tell is the debut studio album by the American indie rock band Yeah Yeah Yeahs, released in April 2003 by Polydor Records internationally and Interscope Records in the United States. The band formed in 2000, gaining recognition for their 2001 self-titled debut EP and live performances. They rejected offers from major record labels and financed production themselves, recording the album in 2002 at Headgear Studio in New York City with co-producer David Andrew Sitek. It builds on the sound of their first record and features singer and lyricist Karen O's themes of heartbreak, intimacy, and sexuality.

After finishing Fever to Tell, the band embarked on their first tour and compiled unused material from recording sessions into the Machine EP (2002). Four singles were also released for promotion: "Date with the Night", "Pin", "Maps", and "Y Control". The album peaked at number 55 on the US Billboard 200 and number 13 on the UK Albums Chart, achieving gold certifications in both territories. It sold over one million copies worldwide by the end of the decade, aided by the success of "Maps", becoming the band's best-selling album.

Fever to Tell was acclaimed for its sound and Karen O's performances, earning nominations for the Grammy Award for Best Alternative Music Album and the Shortlist Music Prize. It has since been regarded as a key work in the decade's garage rock and post-punk revivals, and features on several critics' rankings of the best albums of all time. The album was reissued as an expanded box set in 2017.

== Background and recording ==
Yeah Yeah Yeahs were formed in 2000 by singer/songwriter Karen O and guitarist Nick Zinner as a "trashy, punky, [and] grimy" band inspired by their observations of the contemporary Ohio music scene. Drummer Brian Chase was added to the lineup a day before their debut show, becoming a permanent fixture and making a trio. They self-released their self-titled debut EP in 2001, and it became a sleeper hit after it was reissued by Touch and Go Records in the United States and Wichita Recordings in the United Kingdom in 2002.

Yeah Yeah Yeahs's first record and live shows netted them international attention by 2002. They received offers from major record labels to finance and produce their debut album, but rejected them as they felt it would compromise their creative control. They instead chose to fund production themselves and hired the then-unknown David Andrew Sitek (TV on the Radio) as a co-producer. They cancelled a performance at that year's Reading Festival in focus on recording the album, choosing the low-budget Headgear Studio in Brooklyn. The album was mixed by Zinner and sound engineer Alan Moulder in London.

== Music and lyrics ==
For Fever to Tell, Yeah Yeah Yeahs continued to develop the sound of their first record, inspired by the "trashy, punky, grimy" sound of the contemporary Ohio music scene. While their previous release did not have any bass, Zinner played bass in the studio recordings but went uncredited. Critics have likened the album's sound to the bands Siouxsie and the Banshees, Led Zeppelin and the Velvet Underground, and the musicians Lydia Lunch and PJ Harvey. Some reviewers suggested that, in addition to the art punk and garage rock influences, it also features elements of dance-punk and new wave.

Karen O wrote the lyrics for Fever to Tell, while the band co-wrote the music. The album thematically explores female sexuality, heartbreak and intimacy. Karen O explains in a 2005 interview with The Believer:

I was at the peak of being completely absorbed in the New York night scene and the New York music and social scene, although there wasn't much of a music scene at that point. But the whole hedonistic side of me was kind of trumping everything else. We were feeding off that manic street energy. It really did feel much dirtier and more antagonistic. And as the years have gone by, I think we're more removed from just being there. So we had to rely on other things that were more inside of us. I think that's when the second half of our Fever to Tell album started happening... We were relying more on our emotions and what was going on inside. The inner turmoil rather than the outer turmoil.

== Promotion and release ==
After completing Fever to Tell, Yeah Yeah Yeahs signed with Interscope Records for distribution at the insistence of Lee Ranaldo of Sonic Youth. They began promoting the album in 2002, releasing the moderately-successful EP Machine—consisting of three songs from the album's recording—and embarking on the Fever to Tell Tour from 2002 to 2003. Polydor Records distributed the album internationally on April 28, 2003, while Interscope released it in the United States the next day.

"Date with the Night" was the first single released from the album in April 2003, which became the band's first entry on the UK singles chart at number 16. "Pin" followed in June 2003, which peaked at 29 in the UK and 34 on the Scottish Singles Chart. "Maps" was released in September 2003 as the album's third single, and became their first appearance in February 2004 on the US Billboard Hot 100 at number 87. Its music video became a hit on MTV and rock radio and helped triple sales of the album. "Y Control" was the final single produced from Fever to Tell, released in June 2004. Experiencing similar success to "Pin", it gained attention for its controversial music video.

In 2017, Fever to Tell was remastered and reissued digitally and with a limited edition box set, both of which feature expanded track listings and bonus content.

== Reception ==
Professional ratings
Aggregate scores
Source	Rating
Metacritic	85/100
Review scores
Source	Rating
AllMusic	5/5 stars
Blender	4/5 stars
Entertainment Weekly	B
The Guardian	4/5 stars
NME	8/10
Pitchfork	7.4/10
Q	4/5 stars
Rolling Stone	4/5 stars
Uncut	5/5 stars
The Village Voice	B+

Fever to Tell debuted at number 67 on the Billboard 200 on May 17, 2003. It remained there for 28 weeks, exiting the chart on April 3, 2004. It is tied with the band's third album, It's Blitz! (2009), for most weeks spent on the chart. In March 2009, Fever to Tell reached sales of more than one million copies worldwide. As of March 2013, the album had sold 640,000 copies in United States.

At Metacritic, which assigns a normalized rating out of 100 to reviews from mainstream publications, Fever to Tell received an average score of 85 based on 27 reviews, indicating "universal acclaim". Rolling Stone's Jon Pareles believed Fever to Tell was evidence that "the New York rock renaissance runs deeper and wilder than the Strokes." He greatly praised Karen O's energy and performances, calling her "one excitable girl." Heather Phares of AllMusic praised "Karen O's unearthly vocals, Nick Zinner's ever-expanding guitar prowess, and Brian Chase's powerful drumming" but felt that, due to "poor sequencing", Fever to Tell was "at different times, scattered and monotonous." Entertainment Weekly's Josh Tyrangiel praised the band and deemed Fever to Tell "the Karen O show." However, he opined the album "feels a lot like a series of quickies — exhausting, fun, but a bit empty."

Andrew Perry from The Daily Telegraph called it an "exhilarating dose of lo-fi garage-rock". In The Village Voice, Robert Christgau observed "a striking sound" that is "both big and punk, never a natural combo", and highlighted by Zinner's "dangerous riffs". He had reservations about the subject matter, however; while noting "two human-scale songs toward the end", Christgau said "to care about this band you have to find Karen O's fuck-me persona provocative if not seductive, and since I've never been one for the sex-is-combat thing, I find it silly or obnoxious depending on who's taking it seriously."

Fever to Tell was nominated for a Grammy Award for Best Alternative Music Album and was certified gold in both the United States and the United Kingdom. The video for "Maps" received nominations for Best Art Direction, Best Cinematography, Best Editing, and the MTV2 Award at the 2004 MTV Video Music Awards. The New York Times chose Fever to Tell as the best album of 2003.

== Legacy ==
Professional ratings
Retrospective reviews
Review scores
Source	Rating
The Line of Best Fit	10/10
Louder Sound	4/5 stars
Uncut	4.5/5 stars

Fever to Tell has impacted several genres, especially within NYC's early-'00s rock resurgence. In 2018, it was deemed "one of [that scene's] few enduring albums" by Steve Foxe of Paste. The site rated it #15 out of the 50 all-time greatest garage rock albums. Within indie rock, Fever has left "an indelible mark". In 2022, NME's Erica Campbell wrote that it paved the way for the genre's future "devil may care frontwom[e]n and an abundance of rule-breaking by those seeking post-punk creativity." In 2023, uDiscover Music's Laura Stavropoulos wrote that dance-rock, NYC's next wave, was put "into motion" through the "groove-laden" album. Within the era's "quickly calcifying" garage rock revival, Stavropoulos wrote that it provided "a sense of fun and urgency" to the scene.

Fever's 2017 reissue garnered critical acclaim. The Line of Best Fit's Joe Goggins wrote that it was "still [the band's] masterpiece" and dubbed it "a chaotic symphony in sex, debauchery and bottomless anxiety," positively comparing it to PJ Harvey's 1993 album Rid of Me. Uncut's Michael Bonner praised that it stayed "as visceral, as exciting, [and] as confounding as ever."

In June 2005, the album was ranked number 89 on Spin magazine's list of the 100 Greatest Albums, 1985–2005. Featuring in the 2010 book 1001 Albums You Must Hear Before You Die, Fever to Tell was hailed as "the coolest and cleverest record of 2003". In 2009, the album was named by NME, Pitchfork, and Rolling Stone the fifth, 24th, and 28th best album of the 2000s decade, respectively. In 2019, the album was ranked 38th on The Guardian's 100 Best Albums of the 21st Century list. In 2020, it was ranked number 377 on Rolling Stone's 500 Greatest Albums of All Time list. In 2026, it was ranked number 46 on Rolling Stone's 100 Greatest Punk Albums of All Time list.

== Track listing ==
All tracks are written by Yeah Yeah Yeahs.

Fever to Tell track listing
No.	Title	Length
1.	"Rich"	3:36
2.	"Date with the Night"	2:35
3.	"Man"	1:49
4.	"Tick"	1:49
5.	"Black Tongue"	2:59
6.	"Pin"	2:00
7.	"Cold Light"	2:16
8.	"No No No"	5:14
9.	"Maps"	3:39
10.	"Y Control"	4:00
11.	"Modern Romance"	3:11
12.	"Poor Song" (hidden track)	3:04
Total length:		37:25

Notes

- Releases in Japan feature the bonus track "Yeah! New York" and a CD-ROM video of "Date with the Night".
- The 2017 reissue features an expanded track listing of unused tracks, demos, and recordings of live performances.

== Personnel ==
Credits adapted from the liner notes of Fever to Tell.

Yeah Yeah Yeahs

- Brian Chase – drums, production
- Karen O – vocals, production
- Nick Zinner – guitars, drum machine, production; mixing (tracks 1–7, 9, 10)

Additional personnel

- Cody Critcheloe – artwork

Technical personnel

- Chris Coady – post-production (tracks 8, 11)
- Chris Moore – post-production (tracks 8, 11)
- Rick Levy – mixing assistance
- Roger Lian – track editing
- Paul Mahajan – engineering
- Alan Moulder – mixing (tracks 1–7, 9, 10)
- David Andrew Sitek – production; mixing (tracks 8, 11)
- Howie Weinberg – mastering

== Charts ==
Chart performance for Fever to Tell
Chart (2003–2004)	Peak position
Australian Albums (ARIA)	80
European Albums (Music & Media)	42
French Albums (SNEP)	70
Irish Albums (IRMA)	18
Norwegian Albums (VG-lista)	39
Scottish Albums (Official Charts)	12
UK Albums (Official Charts)	13
US Billboard 200	55

== Certifications and sales ==
Certifications for Fever to Tell
Region	Certification	Certified units/sales
United Kingdom (BPI)	Gold	205,000
United States (RIAA)	Gold	640,000
Summaries
Worldwide	—	1,000,000
