= Headgear Studio =

American recording studio

Coordinates: 40.717745°N 73.962707°W

Headgear Studio (also known as Headgear Recording Studio) was an American recording studio based in Williamsburg, Brooklyn. It was founded in 1998.

== Studio History ==
Headgear was founded in 1998 by Alex Lipsen and Dan Long. In 2000, engineer Scott F. Norton joined as a partner and the studio relocated its facilities near the Brooklyn waterfront. The studio was featured in an article in Tape Op magazine in October 2008. Headgear first attracted attention when the Yeah Yeah Yeahs recorded their 2003 debut album, Fever to Tell, there with producer David Sitek. That album was nominated for a 2004 Grammy Award for Best Alternative Music Album. Sitek subsequently recorded with his band, TV on the Radio at Headgear and built the adjoining Stay Gold Studio in the same building.

According to their Facebook page, the studio closed in 2012.

== Artists who have recorded at Headgear include ==
- All-American Rejects (DreamWorks) with Tim O'Heir (producer/engineer)
- Ambulance LTD (TVT Records) with producer Ron Schaffer
- Andromeda
- Animal Collective
- Apache Beat
- Appleseed Cast (deep elm records) with engineer/producer John Agnello
- Au Revoir Simone
- Celebration
- Chavez
- CocoRosie (Touch and Go Records)
- Cymbals Eat Guitars
- Dinner with the Band (IFC)
- Dirty On Purpose
- Early Man
- Echosuite
- Entrance (Tigerstyle Records) with engineer/producer Chris Cody
- Everyothers with engineer/producer Tim O'Heir
- Fireworks Go Up! with engineer/producer John Agnello
- Golden Triangle
- Grand Mal
- Grooms
- Heavy Trash
- Heroine Sheiks (rubric records) with engineer/producer Greg Gordon
- Hot Rod Circuit (Vagrant Records) with engineer/producer Tim O'Heir
- Inouk
- Jay Farrar with engineer/producer John Agnello
- Jennifer O'Connor
- Keepaway
- Kevin Devine
- Lee "Scratch" Perry
- Light Asylum
- Louque (Lava Records)
- Ludlow Lions
- Massive Attack
- Meshell N'degeocello
- Miracle of 86 - (deep elm records)
- Moses Murphy
- Muckaferguson - (deep elm records)
- The Naked Hearts
- Parts and Labor
- Pela
- Phosphorescent
- The Picture
- Radio 4
- RaRaRiot
- Ribbons
- Sam Champion
- Sam Winch with producer Rod Sherwood
- Santigold (with producer John Hill)
- Shakira (with producer John Hill)
- Son Volt with engineer/producer John Agnello
- Tensixties
- The Boggs (Arena Rock Recording)
- The Dragons of Zynth
- The Hold Steady ( Soundtrack for Dylan Movie)
- The Infidels
- The Jealous Girlfriends with engineer/producer Dan Long
- The Knife (Remixed by David Sitek)
- The List
- The National
- Tiombe Lockhart
- TV On The Radio
- Vic Thrill
- White Magic
- World Inferno Friendship Society with engineer/producer Tim O'Heir
- Yeah Yeah Yeahs
- Zach de la Rocha
