= Cluedo (Australian game show) =

Australian television game show

- Cluedo logo
- Genre: Game show, mystery, comedy
- Based on: Cluedo
- Developed by: Crawford Action Time; Nine Network (in conjunction)
- Written by: Vince Moran; Karin Altmann; Vicki Madden; Graeme Farmer; Ray Boseley; Tony Cavanaugh; Elizabeth Coleman; Michael Harvey
- Directed by: Paul Maloney; Oscar Whitbread; Mark DeFriest
- Presented by: Ian McFadyen
- Starring: Jane Badler; Nicki Paull; Andrew Daddo; Peter Sumner; George Mallaby; Joy Westmore; Frank Gallacher
- Composers: Romper Stomper (theme music); John Clifford White (incidental music)
- Country of origin: Australia
- Original language: English
- No. of seasons: 2
- No. of episodes: 25

Production
- Executive producer: Terry Ohlsson
- Producer: David Taft
- Production location: Melbourne
- Editor: Scott McLennan
- Running time: 50 minutes

Original release
- Network: Nine Network; WIN Network
- Release: 1992 – 1993

Related
- Cluedo (Britain); Il delitto è servito (Italy); Cluedo (France); Cluedo (Germany); Cluedo (Portugal); Cluedo (Sweden)

Cluedo is an Australian whodunnit game show based on the British series of the same name and inspired by the 1949 board game Cluedo. It was produced by Crawford Action Time (a collaboration of Crawford Productions and Action Time) in conjunction with Nine Network. The show saw a studio audience view a dramatised scenario, then complete rounds of interrogating the six suspects on stage in character and viewing further evidence through a pre-recorded criminal investigation. Players then deduced the solution to the murder case using a trio of computer-linked electronic dials (whodunnit, whatdunnit, and wheredunnit), and after the solution was revealed the first person who had locked-in this combination won a prize.

Cluedo lasted two series from 1992 to 1993 and was presented by Ian McFadyen. It aired on the Nine Network and WIN Television network. No DVD or digital release has been made and only bootleg copies are known to exist, however, televised episodes and scripts are housed at National Film and Sound Archive (NFSA) in Canberra, while other Cluedo materials including press clippings have been gifted to the Australian Film Institute (AFI) Research Collection in Melbourne.

== Background ==
=== Predecessors ===
In 1991, Australian media company Crawford Productions (Note: Renamed Crawfords Australia after being acquired by Ariadne in 1987) partnered with British quiz-and-gameshow production company Action Time in conjunction with Channel Nine to produce an Australian televisualisation of the Cluedo franchise. Cluedo was "loosely based" on the board game and adapted from the British TV game show Cluedo (1990-3). There were many predecessors to its creation.

The original 1949 board game, invented by Anthony E. Pratt and simultaneously manufactured by Waddington Games (UK) and Parker Brothers (US), saw players control six guests with colour-based names who move through Tudor Close country house, making suggestions to deduce who murdered host Dr. Black or Mr. Boddy respectively, in which room, and with which weapon. By the 1990s, it was described as "ever-popular" and "famous", and The Age noted it was "the world's second most popular board game". Liverpool Echo described it as a "tried-and-tested...brilliant old Christmas stand-by game", while Aberdeen Press and Journal described it as "addictive". The first real-life Cluedo characters were the 1963 Swiss and 1972 US board game editions, which featured actors on the box and cards, replacing earlier editions which had only shown graphic depictions of the suspects.

The concept of a whodunnit gameshow was arguably first developed by writer Kit Denton for Australian production company NLT Productions in the late 1960s, though the project called Whodunnit never made it beyond the outline and script stages. In 1972, Jeremy Lloyd and Lance Percival created another program called Whodunnit?, which saw a panel collect clues and guess the identity of culprits after viewing prerecorded footage and interrogating suspects. An "obvious forerunner" to Cluedo, the show was hosted by Jon Pertwee for most of its run and lasted six series.

A live action adaptation of Cluedo was first attempted in 1985 with the US theatrical film Clue, which had since become a cult film despite initial mixed reviews and poor box office performance. One of the "earliest post-literary adaptations", according to Thomas Leitch in Post Script journal, the film both "omit[ted] several distinctive features of the game" such as the cards, the interactive pursuit, and questioning, and "specif[ied] many details the game leaves blank" including characterisation and a definitive solution.

That year, US manufacturer Parker Brothers brought the characters to life in the interactive movie Clue VCR Mystery Game, played in conjunction with the board game, which sold several hundred thousand copies and was possibly the first VCR game. In 1989, Michael Aspel hosted a five-episode televised interactive murder mystery set at a wedding called Murder Weekend, which invited viewers to solve a whodunnit to win a prize; The Times identified it as a direct ancestor of Cluedo.

In the late 1980s and early 1990s, a "minor spate" of game shows were created as conversions of popular puzzle and board games, a trend spurred by the success of new works like Trivial Pursuit. Both the Trivial Pursuit and Cluedo television adaptations would be the brainchild of independent production company Action Time's founder and managing director Stephen Leahy. (Note: Founded in 1978 as a UK broker of US game shows for broadcasting groups including Granada, Action Time transitioned into independent programme production around 1980 and by 1987 it had been acquired and folded into Carlton Communications division Zenith Productions. a joint venture of Carlton Television and Paramount Television.) Leahy had previously spent 16 years at ITV franchisee Granada Television, where according to Head of Entertainment David Liddiment he "built some of the finest quiz and game shows" internally like The Krypton Factor (1977) and Busman's Holiday (1985) rather than the norm of "pinch[ing] American shows". In January 1988, Leahy left to become managing director of Action Time which at the time had just a few commissions and UK game show rights; over the next two years he oversaw a growth period resulting in ownership of rights to 103 games shows worldwide including 27 in the UK, and producing over 20 series for ITV by May 1990. In 1991, Birmingham Mail would describe Action Time as "one of the big export successes in British TV", thanks to Leahy having spotted a gap in the game show market in the 1980s and built an empire. The newspaper believed that Leahy's success since working on The Krypton Factor meant he was "naturally first in the queue on the day Waddingtons released the [television] rights to Cluedo".

=== British conception ===
Cluedo's development coincided with Leahy's belief that gameshows were "not just a hammock for something else, but a rating-puller in their own right", and that they would explode in popularity over the following years. He felt that gameshows were a rare form of television entertainment that required something of the viewer, and that the constant, comforting airing schedules of shows like Wheel of Fortune mean "you know where you are, how to do it and it's a bit of an achievement when you get it done" with the addictive nature of a newspaper crossword puzzle. He was wary of this trend however; in a worldwide search for the next Wheel of Fortune he had come across Monopoly, the US television adaption of "the world’s greatest board game to television", and experienced anguish at it being transformed into a "terrible...mess". He believed it "doesn't work, because it's more fun to play than watch", and felt the viewer experience was like being knocked out of the game but having to sit through others finishing it anyway.

In contrast, his version of Cluedo promised to be an entertainment show distancing itself from traditional board game design elements, devoid of a game board, dice moves, and scoring. To Leahy, a Cluedo television game show offered an opportunity to further evolve the board game concept by offering a serialised format featuring clue-laden dramatic vignettes and having players work out the solution. He described the series as "parlour entertainment" in which there were no buzzers, scoreboards, or prizes like contemporary game shows, instead opting for gameplay based on teams competing to solve a mystery through deduction and elimination. Action Time head of production Malcolm Quiggan later assessed that Cluedo had proven itself as an exception to game shows not working on television because "we’re not watching players shaking dice and moving counters". Additionally, Mrs. Peacock actress Stephanie Beacham would admit to preferring the dramatised version over playing the board game itself, which was "far too complex" due to its many rules.

Leahy's experience with Monopoly reinforced his faith that Cluedo was "on the right lines" and a "better bet for success", having opted for a "drama with a star-studded cast" over a "hopping midget". While "big names" were to be cast, Leahy aimed to avoid the trap of making it little more than a platform for stars noting, "we try and write...shows which work in their own right" with names as a bonus. Leahy criticised the US production method where syndication necessitated a 'done by committee' form of decision-making, resulting in a dearth of ideas. While noting the importance of star vehicles to highlight talent and attract audiences, Leahy argued "the shows are growing more intelligent and demanding hosts intelligent enough to host them", revealing that after presenting Busman's Holiday to US executives they were "gobsmacked" it had a female host who was "intelligent, articulate, and [not] a bimbo". Cluedo would ultimately be hosted by James Bellini (1990), Chris Tarrant (1991), and Richard Madeley (1992–93) over its four-series run.

In September 1989, rights to the Cluedo television format were acquired by Granada from board-game creators Waddington for £1 million, with London Weekend Television controller of entertainment John Kaye Cooper producing the resulting British game show adaptation at a cost of £2 million. (Sunday Mirror noted that by series 4 Cluedo would cost £400,000-an-episode). Granada prepared to produce six half-hour episodes of Cluedo, and commenced talks with several actors to play the characters. The Cluedo project was initially announced to the public on February 25, 1990, and the show premiered on ITV on July 25 later that year. Liddiment anticipated it would be the next big success for Granada, noting, "everybody has played Cluedo at some time in their lives [so] we have this rather daunting and exciting responsibility to bring it to the screen".

=== British development ===
Kevin K. Rattan, writer of the British version's first series, had only a couple of days to write each script as their writer had dropped out last minute. After a Friday meeting with the directors and a Saturday lunch with the producer, he delivered a script twenty four hours later which became the premiere episode of the series. He had experience writing short efficient scrips from his time on game show The Krypton Factor. Rattan addended his scripts with notes for the actors to ensure characters had alibies for the time of the murder, which he compared to the Dungeon Master position in role-playing game Dungeons & Dragons.

Produced by Action Time and Granada, Cluedo was "wisely", according to The Times, developed in association and consultation with Waddington Games. While Granada underwent a public battle with the Independent Television Commission in October 1991, the production company ultimately won and Cluedo was unaffected. The show attracted new talent; John O'Regan, who worked on Cluedo in series four, was the youngest person ever appointed director at Granada, while Russell T Davies, later known for his 2005 revival of science fiction show Doctor Who, also wrote an episode that year. Staff writers intermittently travelled to Manchester, where the location shooting occurred, for script conferences, which Cluedo writer Michael Feeley Callan did while completing several episodes in 1993.

Cluedo premiered on British screens on 25 July at 7pm on Wednesday nights in a slot previously occupied by Busman's Holiday. When selling the show, Leahy aimed to help buyers from the ground up including showing them floor plans of their sets, and he hoped to ship these sets overseas once their UK runs had wrapped to ensure consistency of quality in their versions. In May 1990, Action Time announced its intention to negotiate with US parties to place its formats with their broadcasters. By March 1992, Broadcast had reported Leahy was soon to complete a deal that would bring Cluedo to network television in the US. However, this never came to fruition.

The show followed "pretty much the same format" of Jeremy Lloyd and Lance Percival's earlier detective fiction program Whodunnit? (1972), which had also aired on ITV. Whodunnit? featured multiple panelists (Joanna Lumley, Mollie Sugden, Robin Nedwell, June Whitfield) and suspects (Christopher Biggins) who would later appear as main characters in Britain's Cluedo. However, the programme differs from its predecessor by involving the same six suspected murderers in each episode and featuring separate murders each week in the same house. Additionally, Daily Record assessed that the new series came "hot on the heels" of Murder Weekend, noting that Cluedo would feature celebrities and be much snappier and briefer than the "dreadfully-contrived caper [that] dragged on forever".

When Cluedo first aired in Britain, Evening Herald noted the franchise had "finally" made the transition to television. Considering Cluedo an "evolved" form of the whodunnit board game, The Times wondered why no one had previously thought to make a television adaption of the genre's "original classic". Dundee Courier anticipated that "aficionados" of the popular board game would "love" the televised version. Described by The Listener as "mix[ing] acted assassination with studio speculation", the show gave players a chance to "pretend to be [Inspector] Morses", according to The Guardian.

== Development ==
=== Conception ===
In the early 1990s, formatting including licensing started to develop and British producers began to set fees for the use of their programme concepts to markets such as Australia. Around this time, Seven Network and Ten Network were both in receivership, while Nine Network maintained a strong position and owned 50% of the television market. Back in 1989, Oberon Broadcasters, the parent company of Nine Network affiliate WIN Television, had acquired Australian independent studio Crawfords. A "dominant player" in the industry, Crawfords sat on eight acres and encompassed state-of-the-art sound stages with production and post-production facilities.

Channel Nine and Crawfords decided to work together on a "big budget" Australian version of Cluedo after observing the success of its forerunner's first few seasons on British television. Encyclopedia of Television suggests the show came into development as part of a strategy by Crawfords to diversify into co-productions across multiple genres, triggered by drama The Flying Doctors' (1988) international success. Other projects to come from this campaign include multicultural sitcom Acropolis Now (1989), miniseries The Feds (1993), and children's series Halfway Across the Galaxy and Turn Left (1994).

On 7 October 1991, The Sydney Morning Herald reported Nine was producing a series of pilots for the new year, with development of Crawfords' Cluedo set to commence the following week; at that stage Nikki Paul and Peter Sumner were confirmed with Frank Gallagher and George Mallaby mentioned as possibles; the host of the show was touted as Simon Rogers who had recently hosted Theatre Sports. After a string of unsuccessful pilots, Nine remained unsatisfied with any of their choices of compere until an employee suggested actor-producer Ian McFadyen as the "right mixture of background".

Since wrapping up production of his comedy series The Comedy Company in 1990, McFadyen's Media Arts had been working on various projects including a pilot for sitcom Newlyweds, due to air on Seven Network. Aiming to "develop new comedy and drama for the local market", Media Arts formed a joint venture with Crawfords entitled Crawfords Media International; as a result, McFadyen had become a known entity within Nine's portfolio.

After accepting the role, it was officially announced on 4 January 1992, that Cluedo would be hosted by McFadyen. By January 13, Peter Sumner, Joy Westmore and George Mallaby had also been announced while Andrew Daddo was in talks to reprise his role from the pilot. Casting of five of the suspects plus the inspector were officially announced later that month while Mallaby as Colonel Mustard was set to be joining the show, but yet to be confirmed. Mallaby was included in reports by the show's debut on June 10. While the British version recast with each successive series including for the Christmas special seeing three new casts within the first 12 months of its run, the Australian actors were consistent over Cluedo's two series.

Crawfords began production of the "high-profile" show in Melbourne in February 1992 and that month Sunday Herald-Sun reported that McFadyen was busy "sorting out suitable plots" for the show. Due to copyright restrictions Channel Nine and Crawfords sought assistance from Action Time, with the aim being for Crawfords to produce six other game shows with Action Time and to sell them to different networks. Crawfords' association with Action Time ultimately did not continue past Cluedo. By mid-March, the production was being reported on in British media.

=== Format ===
According to Albert Moran's Moran's guide to Australian TV series (1993), a scholarly guide to Australian TV series, Cluedo was an "interesting" series to come out of Crawfords. Though the company had made many game and quiz shows for HSV-7 in the early days of television, it had "long since vacated the genre" to the Reg Grundy Organisation and other packagers. Crawfords' return to light entertainment, Cluedo executive producer and Crawfords CEO Terry Ohlsson viewed it as "a major step into virgin territory" for the production company which had since built a reputation for sitcoms, dramas, feature films, and miniseries. They were particularly well-known for producing Division 4 in the 1960s, The Sullivans in the 1970s, and The Flying Doctors in the 1980s.

According to McFadyen, the network regarded Cluedo as "a complete experiment...an absolute unknown quantity", and he admitted to being nervous as the series began because "we'[d] never done it before". The Age noted that while it was a "big gamble" it was one that could pay off, while The Sun-Herald anticipated Crawfords would break Grundy's monopoly on the market. The Canberra Times wrote that in terms of this genre, Cluedo's dramatised murders were particularly suited to Crawford's "traditional expertise". Ohlsson agreed that Cluedo was "fair game" as "we reckon we can make game shows as well as anyone else".

Ohlsson noted that Cluedo was a "rare" game show where home audiences have just as much chance to play as the studio audience, and actually had an advantage due to being able to concentrate more. He felt that "we're almost into interactive television with Cluedo", while The Daily Telegraph-Mirror asserted the series was indeed Australia's first interactive game show as audiences used their detective skills to solve a murder and win prizes. Moran thought the show was "not all that far removed" from an earlier Crawfords program Consider Your Verdict (1961), though admitted that Cluedo "maximises audience participation" by having the audience question the characters, while the other show "deliberately underplayed audience involvement" and avoided offering prizes for anticipating the jury's verdict.

Cluedo was "far from a high-risk venture", according to The Sydney Morning Herald, as it was based on a successful overseas television series in "great Australian game show tradition" and noted the "innovative thinking" in choosing a British show rather than the American shows that were more frequently adapted. Ohlsson agreed that "Australian audiences are too sophisticated to take the mindless stuff that goes on in the US in daytime". Noting their audiences chose to watch game shows during peak viewing times, he wanted to give them a challenge and "make them use their brains" deeming Cluedo "complex enough" for this purpose.

McFadyen described the show as "both a deductive game for adults" and one that "teaches kids logic", adding that the drama content and the computerised audience participation elevated the show above contemporaneous American light entertainment. A lover of intellectual puzzles, cryptic crosswords, and brain teasers himself, McFadyen anticipated the format's success after observing people's desire to play along with detective shows like Perry Mason and solve the mystery. He thought it was fascinating that "murder can become a game", and noted gameplay is not based on "how loud you can scream or how much jelly you can tip on each other" as with other shows. The ability for the studio audience to "sharply" grill the suspects led to Cluedo being more complicated than contemporaries like Wheel of Fortune, according to The Sydney Morning Herald. McFadyen described the series as "[Geoffrey Robertson's] Hypotheticals meets Donohue meets Theatre-sports meets Agatha Christie".

The Age thought Cluedo would appeal to "amateur sleuths" who like "finding out who the murderer is"; Ohlsson agreed, "you don't have to be a Mensa candidate to guess". Noting the short attention spans of television viewers who sometimes find a 30-second commercial "long-winded", The Sydney Morning Herald warned the show "will require more mental activity from its audience than most game shows have demanded for decades", wondering how they would "cope with an hour's worth of concentration". In comparison, The Times had thought the British show's "tightly scripted" 30-minute format allowed for meeting all the characters, viewing the murder setup, and having players solve the puzzle within an efficient runtime. Jane Badler, who played Mrs. Peacock, felt that for viewers who weren't keen on quiz shows, the drama itself would be enough to "lure them in", noting "viewers may just be watching to find out what happened".

== Design ==
Two drafts were written per episode, followed by a release script, and script edited by an additional writer – Vicki Madden in series one and Graeme Farmer in series two. Drafts contained extensive annotations, amendments, and guidelines for future production staff. In addition to the storyline, scripts included cast lists and motives, background notes on the guest character, lists of possible murder weapons, approximate timings of events, the script running order, and confession scenes which were referred to as 'The Denouncement'. Farmer wrote two episodes of the 13-part series one, and admitted the show was "great fun for a writer".

=== 3D characterisation ===
Rattan explained that a quirk of the Cluedo writing process means "you always have to kill a stranger, not a member of your cast", noting that unlike real world statistics the structure of the show requires their murders are never domestic. Instead, relationship stresses were designed to give the six suspects reasons to lash out at people outside the "normal group", and according to Rattan character motives were designed not to be too "vicious" or "unpleasant".

As such, the show offered an opportunity to flesh out the previously one-dimensional board game characters through the addition of motives, personalities and life histories. Scarlett actress Koo Stark noted "You play the role of a caricature in the board game. It's not a case of trying to interpret a character from a novel, but you have to believe it as much as you can". Leslie Grantham, who played Colonel Mustard in the British version, commented, "it's fascinating to watch these asexual, inanimate characters brought to life". The Age agreed the show "brings to life the board-game characters", while The Sydney Morning Herald felt the game show was a sophisticated interpretation of the "very successful" board game. The Age thought the Cluedo board game was "such a rarity" as it came with a "ready-made cast of six dreadfully cliched characters", citing Peacock's dowager, Reverend's vicar, and Mustard's retired lieutenant.

The Sunday Times noted the small screen adaption takes the characters out of their "original cozy pre-war setting" and "brought sharply into the 1990s". In comparison with the "old and ugly" Mrs. Peacock represented in the board game, the creatives decided to make her "very glamorous" in order to compete with Miss Scarlett for romantic affection. Of the six main suspects, James Cockington of The Sydney Morning Herald anticipated that the public would start "studying these people" intensely, while The Age suggested "all viewers will have their favourite suspect". Italian newspaper Radiocorriere TV noted that a gender balance is structured into the game, which features a fixed cast of three actors and three actresses as suspects.

Regarding the victim, The Newcastle Herald they are generally someone who "has given each character equal reason to do [them] in", while Farmer explained, "it is necessary for the writers to establish the murder victim as a thoroughly unlikable character so our sympathies are with the Brindabella regulars who get to bump them off". Deserving murder victims include a conman, an "architect without morals", and a drunken, unscrupulous journalist. McFadyen joked about including a TV critic as one of the victims, reasoning that "all the suspects would want to be in on the kill".

I let [the audience] get used to obnoxious strangers always getting killed, then bumped off not the Mister Nasty in one episode, but someone wandering around in the background in a cuddly dragon suit. That kind of tinkering made it fun to do. I also enjoyed another episode where everyone sees Mrs. White try to commit the murder. Only someone else gets there first (though the audience doesn't find that out till later).

In one episode however I used the crooklock without any one actually seeing it, the producer thought no one would go for it as the murder weapon because of this, but I had the professor go outside during the play, and it worked. One of the contestants followed the line of reasoning I'd set up, saying the Professor had done it using the crooklock that he had fetched from outside.

— Kevin K. Rattan, writer of the British Cluedo game show, discussing the design of clues in an interview with Gamesman magazine.

=== Subverting expectations ===
The Age noted that while board games are often only played once a year over the holidays, a television version necessitated new elements to keep viewers interested. When designing the cases Rattan felt seeing the six board game weapons each week would bore players, so included a variety of weapons to achieve his desired murder methods such as strangulation, shooting, and bludgeoning, and placed weapons both inside and outside the house. (Note: Murder methods to feature in the Australian version include bludgeoning, poisoning, shooting, suffocating, strangling, stabbing, electrocution, drowning, and falling.) Unlike the British version, the victims sometimes lived past their 'murder', for instance a slow-acting poison, and the correct solution was where the weapon was administered.

Chris Tarrant, series one host of the British version, admitted a "highly absurd" design aspect was that the six suspects and six episodes per series meant the non-guilty party by the end of episode five was sure to be the murderer in the finale; for series one Rattan subverted what the "papers thought would happen and very 'clever clever' T.V. reviewers were saying" by having one culprit commit murder twice and another not at all, though future series would follow as Tarrant outlined with each cast member given equal opportunity to be the murderer. In contrast, the Australian version featured two series of 13 and 12 episodes and the guilty parties were irregularly spaced between the suspects; the show avoided trends seen in the British version where, for example, Reverend Green only committed murder in the kitchen.

Over the 25 episodes, Mustard committed the most murders (six), while Peacock and Green tied for the fewest (three). Four times over the series a culprit committed back-to-back murders, and in one case Mrs. White used the same poison method in both episodes. The Billiard Room (seven) and Library (five) were the most common crime scene while the Dining Room (two) was used the least. The most common murder methods were poison (six), blunt weapons (five), and sharp weapons (five), while unique methods like drowning and falling were used once each. Both shootings were committed by Mustard while both electrocutions were by Plum, and all but one kitchen murder was committed by White.

=== Blank slate and red herrings ===
Cluedo features a regular cast of six characters who return each week to stand accused of the murder of a visitor. Mrs. White actress Joy Westmore noted that the premise relies on "the same characters returning week after week" with a blank slate and "pretending nothing happened the week before". She added that "no-one is ever hauled off to jail" or acknowledges that just days earlier they had been found guilty of murder. The Age agreed that "each week the slate is swept clean" and that "any indiscretions that may have been committed the previous week are ignored, and the story starts anew". McFadyen noted, "I think you have to imagine that all these actors are packed up and put back into their box and brought out to play with again next week – so there's this lovely renewal". Dundee Courier noted that each actor is cast as either the "goodie" or "baddie" based on the specifics of each murder.

According to Woman's Day, a "big attraction" of the series for Miss Scarlet actress Nicki Paull was the "sheer novelty" of "not worrying what the character did last week" due to new scenarios and circumstances in each episode. TV Heaven thought it amusing that after being asked to remain behind for question, the culprits were "clearly acquitted" as they'd return the following week. McFadyen noted the show had "all the intrigue of a soap opera", but that instead of having a continuity, "this mob starts afresh every week". Leahy noted that his creative team decided, "you can't play a murderer one week and come back the next as if nothing had happened without it being all tongue in cheek", which affected the tone of the series. This aspect "proved liberating" for the writers as each week they could "totally reinvent a character's history" and introduce one-off family members "if it's called for, and never mention [them] again, which Leahy likened to a daytime soap opera.

The Times noted the challenges of constructing mysteries that wouldn't be either too hard (an impossible case), or too easy (an immediately-solved case). The press noted that Cluedo "promise[d] to keep us guessing till the very end". Within the show bible, a key tenet is that "you must play fair with the audience so that when the solution is revealed no one should feel cheated by the absence of the necessary clues to get the answer correct". To Ohlsson, the objective was not to "flummox the audience completely" or put them in the position where nobody could get the answer right, "because there's no fun in that", and felt it was important to give people a reasonable chance of reaching the correct solution. McFadyen admitted, "I'm not going to help the audience too much.

Westmore felt series two's murders were slightly easier to solve. Of a live taping, Sunday Herald-Sun reported there being "few on-screen clues" for the would-be detectives. Rattan explained that each show was meticulously planned to prevent guessing, and constructed so that any one of the suspects could have carried it out; there was no concrete evidence to prevent a worst-case scenario where the correct solution was deduced after the first question, effectively spoiling the episode. Nevertheless Daily Mirror suspected a fix in one episode of the British edition as the winning team "suddenly g[otten] it so right when everyone had been so wrong till then".

Mark Wallace of The Canberra Times agreed "there is more guess work than science in finding the killer." Who magazine noted the case to solve the "dastardly deed" is filled with red herrings, and Grantham explained that "everyone has equally good reasons" for murdering the victim. While Sun-Herald noted "there's one obvious suspect" in a plot revolving around a rival cook upsetting Mrs White "even before the mystery unfolds on air", these suspects are "invariably the most innocent". The Age agreed that each week the characters "reappear criminally virginal", and that the show is "based on infinitely renewable innocence". The newspaper noted the mathematical permutations of six characters "taking turns to bump each other off" in six rooms with six weapons are "probably endless.

=== Sanitised, murder-norm world ===
McFadyen felt that the game's mechanic of turning murder into a sanitised game was the evolution of a standardised art form from years of novels and movies, and deemed the show a "wonderful send-up of the old (Agatha Christie-style) drawing-room murder". Stephen J. Cannell's Television Productions: A History of All Series and Pilots suggests murder mystery series like Hart to Hart (1979) and Murder She Wrote (1984) laid the groundwork for a "Cluedo mentality" in which the death of a former friend or new acquaintance was "regarded as nothing more than a simple springboard into a zany caper".

Farmer described Cluedo as an "amoral universe" where "morality ceases", and small real-world micro-aggressions like a dislike of Mrs. White's cooking can turn into motives for murder. He suggested the series "piggybacks on when someone says, 'I hate her so much I could kill her'" by following through. Badler agreed on the link between amorality and acting style, noting "we have to be [tongue-in-cheek] because obviously we're all murdering each other constantly".

The Times suggested that Cluedo offered a "Miss Marple world of vicarage snobbery with violence" rather than anything "blazingly transatlantic". The Age noted Cluedo's "tongue-in-cheek style". TV Times Magazine explained the show is set in a world where "murder always lingers in the next corridor", and The Irish Times noted that within the universe "murder most foul is regularly committed". Paull explained the show's concept necessitated "crazy" storylines to justify someone dying each week and one of the main characters being implicated in the murder, adding that "all the characters are so extreme, their foibles are really overplayed...they're all pretty evil, really". The Daily Telegraph – Mirror thought guest victim Aunt Evelina "seems too cruel to be true", though her actress Beverley Dunn thought "there is some truth in her character, it's not just hyperbole".

Sunday Times further described Cluedo's mystery subgenre as Mayhem Parva. Coined by Colin Watson in Snobbery with Violence (1971) this term describes a mystery subgenre characterised by isolated settings in an English country village with a limited cast of characters who generally take a back seat to the puzzle being presented. The Sydney Morning Herald felt it built off the "current public craving" for thrillers and Agatha Christie weekends. The newspaper's James Cockington thought the series would be a "treat" for Christie fans who like to be "in at the kill".

Of the British version, Sunday Times felt Cluedo was an "up to date" interpretation and offered an "escapist's version of homicide". Badler felt that solving the murder, not the act of murder, was the show's appeal, noting, "people are always interested in macabre things" like mass murders and serial killers, and that there is a "grotesque...fascination with things that are out of the ordinary". Sunday Times highlighted the uniquely soft place 'murder' has in the English lexicon relative to its meaning, noting the unimaginability of a version of Cluedo in which one had to figure out who raped Miss Scarlet in the library, due to the offensive nature of the latter term.

== Plot and gameplay ==
Cluedo is a solve-it-yourself whodunnit gameshow featuring a series of self-contained murder cases. Each episode has 30 minutes of drama and 30 minutes of questions for a total runtime of one hour excluding commercial breaks, as opposed to the British version which had 15 minutes of each save for a one-off 45 minute Christmas special. Additionally, it offers audience participation unlike its predecessor. While McFadyen specified that Cluedo is ultimately a game show, the press saw the series incorporating a variety of genres and formats including: quiz, game show, talk, panel, drama, mystery, thriller, soap opera, melodrama, and comedy. The Age noted it encompassed an "amalgam of styles", while Understanding the Global TV Format described Cluedo as a "hybrid...amalgamation of a game show with a fictional situation and story". The Newcastle Herald described it as an "innovative combination of...two wildly different concepts" – a television game show and a murder.

Moran deemed it an "interesting edge case" that "forces one to be more exact about what constitutes drama" and argued that the quiz/gameshow fits this definition as the "murder mystery core is narratively constructed" and has "actors playing the role of the characters". The show is a "striking instance of television's general tendency to cross genres", according to the book. In Cluedo, the emphasis is on "murder and the race to solve the crime". Nine's publicity blurb wrote the show is "innovative and intriguing, combining the drama and deadly intrigue of a murder mystery with the humour and excitement of a gameshow. The show brought the board game's "familiar' characters to life through a series of live action murder vignettes that the studio audience would watch.

Produced by David Taft as the second Cluedo television adaption following the British version, the Australian game show introduced structural changes that "abandoned" elements of the original. For instance, it features audience sleuthing instead of two teams of panels pairing a celebrity with a crime-related guest like a forensic scientist, High Court judge, or police officer. In addition, the Australia version includes a detective who makes his own inquiries to reveal clues that may be missed during studio cross-examination. Badler noted, "the show is a very faithful adaptation of the board game – with a few exceptions". During the first half of Cluedo, a 140-150 member studio audience views on studio monitors a pre-recorded dramatised version of a crime set at glamorous socialite Mrs. Peacock's fictional quaint country home Brindabella Homestead; cases include the six main characters who frequent the property — Peacock, step-daughter Miss Scarlet and her boyfriend Professor Plum, housekeeper Mrs. White, intimate family friend Colonel Mustard, and local vicar Reverend Green — being implicated in a murder when a "villain[ous]" and "obnoxious" stranger interrupts their established social dynamic. (Note: Some of these relationships are changed from the British version where, for instance, Miss Scarlett was not dating Professor Plum. For the most part, character first names are carried over from this version. Character traits like Mrs. White's husband Mr. White were kept while Reverend Green's Save The Moles campaign were unique to individual British seasons.)

In each episode, the outback estate's six residents welcome the houseguest, grow to loathe them, and then reveal that the visitor has met an untimely death. During the guest's short appearance on screen, they successfully enrage the characters to the point where they have a reason to murder the visitor, who is "promptly bumped off" in a "gruesome" manner" and "no doubt richly deserving [of their] fate". The Sydney Morning Herald explained "their role is to behave so abominably that the audience will not shed a tear at their demise" and that they "succeed admirably". For instance, The Daily Telegraph – Mirror described Aunt Evelina as a "nightmare" and "the auntie from hell", noting she "whinges" the moment she arrives, "fraying" everyone's spirit and claiming she is the true heir to Brindabella.

Around halfway through the broadcast, the murder-of-the-week is revealed, but neither the audience in the studio nor the viewers at home are informed of the location or the manner of death. The game show starts right here. To identify the murderer, the studio audience and viewers at home play detective. After being introduced to the characters and events, throughout the second part of the broadcast players are tasked with picking the culprit and deducing how they committed the crime.

Those in the studio used an electronic system of panels and dials, attached to each audience member's chair, to "lodge [their] suspicions" by selecting the killer's name, method of murder, and body's location, which they could do at any time. Each case featured 6 suspects (Who?), 6 weapons (With what?), and 6 rooms (Where?) for a total of 216 permutations. Studio audience members ask the actors, on stage in character and colour-coordinated costume for easy identification, questions about their motives and actions through an inquiry. Interviewing the Cluedo suspects thus results in them finding clues to advance the investigation and make accusations. Data from the dials was fed into the studio control room, and an audience poll are intermittently fed back from the computer as an onscreen graphic which show how the audience is leaning, similar to the British version; i.e. a people's choice percentage that reveals which suspect is most likely to have committed the crime. The first to feed the right combination into the computer wins a holiday.

A key tenet of cross-examination carried over from the British version, which was either shown on-screen or explained by McFadyen, is that of the six suspects "everyone must tell the truth except, of course, the murderer", who is allowed to lie. Rattan explained the logical framework of the game meant, "if [contestants] asked the right questions and interpreted the answers correctly they could by a process of elimination find out who the murderer was". McFadyen agreed that as the show progresses, "the audience's understanding of the game will increase and the questions will become more and more tricky". The game continued with McFayden "updating us on the state of play" and periodically inviting players to announce their wrong deductions, further reducing possibilities through process of elimination and logical reasoning.

The host, McFadyen, walked around the crowd randomly asking contestants to reveal their three choices. If a person chose one of the three options, for example, their score is revealed but not which responses they chose correctly. After that, other audience members are free to revise their combination. Before revealing the solution, McFadyen replayed a scene containing a key piece of evidence. At the end of each episode, the murderer was revealed in a pre-recorded confession which revealed how and why they committed the crime. The computer records who was the first to choose the correct combination. Then, the audience member who had selected correctly and had not changed their minds would win "huge" and "spectacular" prizes sponsored by Continental Airlines. The home viewers could also enter a competition by phone in before the end of the show to win a similar trip by phoning a 0055 number and correctly picking the electronically logged moment in hours, minutes, and seconds when the first audience member solved the mystery. The Age felt the "prize-winning angle of the show is tastefully underplayed".

== Filming ==

Indoor floor plan (top) and outdoor location shoot (bottom) of Billilla Historic Mansion, where Cluedo's Brindabella Homestead is set. Knowledge of the physical makeup of Brindabella is vital for players to work out where the crime might have happened.

=== On-location and studio filming ===
A pilot was produced in 1991, and series production began on Tuesday, 14 January 1992 consisting of 13 episodes including a reshoot of the pilot and continued through February. TV Week suggested that Palms of an Architect, featuring Andrew Daddo's real-life brother Cameron, was the first episode filmed. Brindabella Homestead's stately exteriors were filmed at Billilla Historic Mansion in Brighton, Melbourne while interiors were shot at Crawford Production's Studio 2 in Box Hill, Melbourne. Before the location was announced, it was known to the press as a classified National Trust mansion in Brighton. According to The Age the murder house's rooms were coloured based on six main characters' names, though this didn't give any hints to the culprit.

There were several rules of the game devised by Cluedo's writers that affected filming. As Brindabella is the scene of all the crimes, the murder had to take place in one of six rooms: the Living Room, Dining Room, Lounge, Study, Billiard Room, or Kitchen. (These are different to the rooms in the British version). Plot-advancing indoor locations where the murder could now take place included: Peacock, Scarlet, Plum's, or the guest bedroom (one per episode), the vestibule, main or kitchen corridors, and kitchen exterior. Every room had to be visited at least once, and the six weapons have to be identified and shown.

Each episode had six drama segments with a total duration of 24–30 minutes. The first segment introduced the guest and sets up motives for murder, and it was necessary for every suspect to have a motive even if it was tenuous. The murder was announced at the end of the second segment and couldn't take place in one of the six suspected rooms. Instead, could occur in outdoor locations like the patio, front steps, or garden, or the vestibule and corridors if inside. The first two segments were kept to a maximum of eight minutes each. In contrast, each British murder scenario segment ran for eight minutes in total.

Subsequently, Bogong had three segments of investigation. Together, these five segments progressed toward a clear solution and eliminated some options along the way. Writers were aware that the game show aspect might potentially result in room, weapon, and suspect eliminations after parts four and five. The sixth segment contained the confession and reenactment of the murder; it was encouraged to favour concluding with the murder over an end tag.

During production season, initial rehearsals were done on a Monday, and actors were not at first told the solution, however, later on they were asked to solve the case to test if the mystery held up to be solvable by a studio audience; they were successful to varying degrees and Westmore improved over the course of the run. Officially, only McFadyen and the culprit knew the identity of the murderer each week, and as a result actors generally didn't receive the ending with the rest of the script. During taping of the "tell-all murder re-enactment scenes", the studio set was closed and exact details kept secret, due to Cluedo's game show format. Badler admitted, "of course, we all find out [the solution] because we can't help ourselves".

Two episodes were filmed each week, the first on Tuesday–Wednesday and the second on Thursday–Friday. By the rehearsal stage there "wasn't much room for changes" to the script. During studio filming Paull had little spare time and 4–6 hours sleep per night, though she appreciated the regular working schedule. Just a half-day was allocated for location filming each episode, and exterior shots were discouraged due to noisiness. Badler asserted that the actors were considered equal to the crew, and that the small budget meant scenes was recorded quickly; additionally a unisex clothesline was used as a dressing room. Shows employed a "painstaking piecing together of evidence", and each pre-recorded portion was filmed in sequential order to ensure a consistency of prop placement.

==== Arlington Grange ====
Upon securing the Cluedo licence, Granada anticipated that the series would require a lot of location shooting to film the murder scenarios. The British version was inspired by the "traditional accoutrements" of the board game, including the "good old English murder a country house" and "fine variety of cultural stereotypes", according to Sunday Times. Brindabella's British analogue Arlington Grange, shot-on-location at the 17th century Arley Hall in Cheshire, was chosen as it had a "near perfect layout of downstairs rooms" that the game of Cluedo requires.

Built in 1744, Arley Hall was privately owned and had become a major tourist attraction since it was opened to the public in 1962. Producer Mark Gorton explained, "the floorplan lends itself to the boardgame very well and that was a major consideration when choosing the location". The Cheshire country house was only 18 miles from the Granada studios in Manchester where the live portions were taped, and open the public only at certain times of the year, both of which made filming easier. The house had to be furnished to fit the 1930s period that the show is set in, while some original furniture was deemed "ideal for the programme"; Gorton noted, ”as far as the owners were concerned, as long as the items weren't too valuable we were free to use them.”

A Billiard Room had to be constructed as Arlington lacked one, which was created in a front drawing room with props including a billiard table, scoring devices, and cues. A huge table was added to the Dining Room with a series of gothic high-backed chairs; Gorton noted, “we also added a variety of strange stuffed animals to lend to it a kind of Addams Family feel". In contrast, the Library needed little attention to appear on screen due to its large fireplace, books, mirrors, and antique chairs, while the Study needed little alteration besides triptychs and a Bakelite telephone.

In later series the Kitchen was a mock-up created in a spare room, as the real kitchen was in use for visitors to Arley Hall and production decided it "felt...too modern for us". The props team brought in an Aga, refrigerator, pine table, a rack of pheasants, and sharp kitchen implements. The Drawing Room "fitted the bill perfectly" due to its "unusual gothic fireplaces" which featured leaping gargoyles and furnishings like oil paintings, however high-backed furniture with lions paw feet was added. The set of the Library was preserved and reused for Germaine Greer's all-women late-night discussion show The Last Word.

For the British version, the actors had two weeks off between the Arley Hall location filming and the studio cross-examination; according to Mrs. White actress Molly Sugden, "usually when you are filming, you tear the page up as soon as you've done it". In the case of series three, there was a 1.5 month gap between location filming and airing, while series four had a two month break between the finished scripts and airing. Heavy rain frequently resulted in outdoor filming blocks either being postponed, or for scenes to be rewritten to take place indoors. For series one, Rattan spent around an hour preparing with the actors prior to each show to test them on "logical questions that would come from the deliberate ambiguities in the play".

=== Live tapings and home participation ===
The live portions were filmed two-per-day on Sunday and Monday at Nine Network's GTV-9 studios in Richmond, Victoria from March 1992. Before taping commenced, warm-up man Pete Smith explained the rules of suspect interrogation and the dial system worked and asked if the audience had any questions. At the start of each episode on a large screen McFadyen introduced the six regular characters who could be guilty, the six possible murder weapons, and the six rooms of the house in a detailed floorplan. He also introduced the "fabulous prizes" that could be won.

According to Cockington, McFadyen's role is to "keep the stop-start action flowing while acting as a link between the studio audience (plus those, watching at home) and the prerecorded and live studio segments"; TV Week agreed with the linking nature of his role and McFadyen noted his Donahue-style running around and moderating of the audience, "trying to keep their questions on [sic] line". The Age suggested his role was to "explain the rules, introduce the dramatic segments, roam the studio audience asking for guesses, and chair an audience cross-examination of the suspects".

After viewing the pre-recorded videotape case footage of the events surrounding the case up until the point the murder is revealed, the six suspects "submit[ed] themselves for questioning", and "placed in the firing line of would-be Miss Marples and Hercule Poirots". After being cross-examined for motives, alibis, and other clues, the players used mini-computer terminals to deduce the solution.

According to Westmore, the success of episodes depended a lot of the type of studio audience, pointing to shows which invited groups of police officers and Air Force officers. The Sydney Morning Herald also noted audience members stemming from the armed services and paramedics. Badler described one audience as "fiery" and "funny" meaning the cast had to "be on [their] toes". The Age reported these live tapings as "fascinating" to watch, and that the audience "couldn't wait to make a guilty verdict". Aberdeen Evening Express commented the show "gets you involved as you try to outwit" the onscreen sleuths.

After The Sydney Morning Herald visited a taping, their reporter recalled a small number of oiks in the studio audience, who "looked as if they wandered in expecting a wet t-shirt competition [or] an episode of Chances", and who said to each other "how to we get the fuck out of here" before leaving at the earliest opportunity. The newspaper noted that the rest of the audience "sat engrossed, fiddling with their handsets and with their powers of deduction working overtime".

The celebrity panelists of the British version sometimes struggled; The Krypton Factor host Gordon Burns commented, "I'm much more used to asking the questions and having the answers". Who magazine described the studio audience as "feverishly busy" and Sunday Herald-Sun wrote the interaction between them and the suspects "seemed to work well". The Sydney Morning Herald wrote that "on the whole the cast of regulars does a fine job, letting rip with the odd ad lib when they face question time".

The Daily Telegraph/Mirror described how McFadyen circulates in the audience and urges members to quiz suspects as "Donahue-style", and The Age similarly likened McFadyen "leap[ing] through the audience to get their deductions or accusations" to the "frenzy" of The Phil Donahue Show. McFadyen explained, "I pick people who want to ask a question and I drop hints. I tease them a bit and I tell them whether they're right or wrong". He considered it a "hypothetical" form of interrogation as instead of politicians to grill on the issues, there were six fictional murder suspects.

The Sunday Age's Kate Nancarrow quipped that "the court is a solemn, respectful place, nothing like Cluedo". This contrasted with the British version in which "it would take forever to film just a few lines because the audience had to be turned over to stop them getting bedsores", according to host Chris Tarrant. McFadyen noted, "once you tell [the audience] they've got a prize they get very excited." He explained that unlike his other acting roles, he needed a teacherly presence in order to control the studio audience; McFadyen had worked as a teacher earlier in his career.

Meanwhile, home sleuths could 'participate' to win a prize by dialing in with the correctly guess at the exact moment the studio audience winner locked in their answer. The number was not set up by June 6 but was later implemented; TV Week reported that callers would not have to "negotiate a maze" as common in other 0055 promotions, and estimated most Cluedo calls to cost $1 on average. In the lead-up to the premiere, Ohlsson said competition lines would be open for four days to handle the calls.

While TV Week was unsure where the money would go and deemed it a Cluedo-esque mystery, The Canberra Times pointed to Kerry Packer as both the owner of the Nine Network and a shareholder in the 0055 line used. A reviewer suggested the show could "swell Channel Nine's coffers by hundreds of thousands of dollars". The Herald-Sun agreed the show was a "potential big money earner" and "healthy revenue raiser" for Nine, noting that if 10% of the network's anticipated audience phoned in Nine, Telecom, and the owner of Double-O Services would collectively earn around $300,000 per episode, and Telecom was expected to collect 40%. The newspaper anticipated it would "probably be one of the hits of the year" for this reason.

==== Interrogation and improvisation ====
The unscripted cross-examination was the toughest part of the actors' roles. The Sunday Telegraph noted the unusual nature of performers having to "put up with" being asked embarrassing questions and "almost subjected to a third-degree interrogation". The production team was surprised by the thorough line of questioning from the young studio audience; they had anticipated them to be shy asking "thorny" questions under the "multifarious cameras and a very long sound boom" of the television studio setup. Instead the cast was given "aggressive" questions from the "intrigued" audience, which didn't let "too many evasive answers get past".

The six suspects could "obviously not give too much away" according to The Age and had to be wary of disclosing information while production noted any potentially defamatory questions. Specifically, the suspect that discovered the body was not allowed to divulge the nature of the death. (Note: Excerpt from The Axeman Cometh: Contestant: "Mrs Peacock, which way was the body lying when you discovered it?" Mrs Peacock: "I don't know, I just know there was a lot of hair." Contestant: "Then how did you assess that he was dead"? Mrs Peacock: "Well, the hair didn't move." Another contestant: "Mrs Peacock, what position was the body laying in when you found him?" Mrs Peacock: "Well I told you, I, I wasn't aware of any position, I just saw a lot of hair.") Similarly, for the purposes of gameplay Detective Sergeant Bogong does not reveal the murder method during his investigation; The Age noted he "consistently has difficulty figuring out whether a victim has been killed with a shotgun or a dressing-gown cord". The actors were trained to deflect questions similar to a politician, noting "if you are innocent, you must tell the truth, but you can respond to the immediate points of a question...or you can answer emotionally and idignantly [sic]...and then steer away from the question altogether".

Paull thought improvising testimony in character was the most enjoyable part of the role. For Whitfield, this was the hardest part; she admitted, "we all spent ages going over all the questions we thought we might be asked – then someone would come up with one we never thought of" The actress "fir[ed] on all cylinders" in order to stay in character, and found her drinking to be a "useful get-out" as she could utilise a brandy flask prop when needing time to construct an answer. Ferris was especially drawn to the opportunity for improvisation and covering of her tracks, noting she had previously done an improvisational show for a year – "we had characters, but no scripts, and it was one of the happiest years of my life".

Mallaby felt this element of the show was "confrontational" as "it's them against us", though noted "the trick is to have a sound knowledge of the play and everything that's involved in it". He recollected a few "curly" times in the first series when someone asked an unexpected question, where "if you don't know off-hand you've got to do a quick mental count". Upon commencing the show, Badler thought the prospect of answering audience questions was "daunting" as it's "like little Agatha Christies sitting in the audience".

McFadyen noted it is "essential that the actors know their characters backwards [as] they'll have to improvise radically". The Daily Telegraph/Mirror thought the suspects "proclaim their innocence with liberal over-acting". The Sydney Morning Herald wrote the cast "excel at staying in character when it comes to question time, which is the nub of the game". As four episodes were presented to studio audiences over two days, the actors sometimes became confused with which plot they were giving testimony to. Sugden planned to take her scripts home to prepare for the cross-examination, noting that while innocent parties must only tell the truth, "the problem is, after six murders, remembering what the truth is".

Westmore explained that by the time she was answering questions for the fourth episode, she was cautious about not getting the current case confused with a previous one. McFadyen estimated that roughly one-quarter of the studio audience are "pretty close" to the correct solution before the murderer is revealed. The censorship sometimes caused content to be peeled back, for example in the British version Mrs. Peacock ad libbed her confession from 'I didn't mean to kill him' to 'I didn't mean to decapitate him', which "got a huge laugh" from the audience, but it was decided to be too graphic for the early evening, so it was cut. In the British version, Birmingham Weekly Mercury praised Beacham's puzzled reply when a panel member remarked that Mrs. Peacock was “a bit of goer”, to which she replied, “Well, I am a very active member of society...”.

== Release ==
=== Publicity and airing ===
While live tapings were occurring in March, Channel Nine and Crawfords were hopeful of the series' ability to entice viewers, and that viewers would keep guessing the murderer throughout the weeks of its run. As part of promotion, on 16 May Daddo and Westmore were invited as guests in Nine's superbox for the Melbourne vs. Hawthorn AFL game, where they enthused about making the programme. Additionally, Badler appeared on the front cover of The Sunday Telegraph on 7 June, she and McFadyen appeared on the front cover of Sunday Herald-Sun for that day's edition, and Paull graced page one of the latter newspaper on 1 January 1993. In honour of the series premiere, journalist Fiona Scott-Norman wrote an article asking celebrities which weapon they would use to deal with a crime at home and scare off introducers. The show featured host Elton Welsby from fellow Granada show Busman's Holiday as a guest panellist. In 1993, Steam Packethosted a murder mystery dinner complete with clues and characters from the British game show Cluedo, which featured a detective played by Charles Palmer, the consultant for the TV series.

Media representatives were invited to live tapings, for instance Christine Rau of The Age, which she referred to in her article dated 29 March 1992. Badler recalled a journalist interviewing her while watching the show and that "he was so involved in trying to guess...that is almost forgot to interview me". The main cast kept secret how many murders they committed when being interviewed by the press, however infrequently a solution was prematurely insinuated, for example The Herald-Sun revealed a rockstar's death was "felled by heavy metal of a different kind", referring to a tuning fork. While Ferris admitted her character had a shady past and was capable of committing murder, though refused to divulge any plots or whodunnit solutions. For the UK version, in July 1990, Judy Finnegan and Richard Madeley present on their mid-morning magazine show This Morning with a special feature on the filming of Cluedo. Sometimes the guest panelists would receive features in the newspaper, for instance private investigator Robert Kettle in Liverpool Echo.; this newspaper also printed Cluedo grids for readers to play along with the show.

Cluedo premiered on 10 June on the Nine Network's TCN and GTV television stations, WIN Television network's VTV station, and on NBN station in the Hunter Region under the banner Crawford Action Time in conjunction with Nine Network. The Sydney Morning Herald's Cockington thought the series was the next "big gun" for the network, which had been "slaughtering the opposition in the 1992 ratings". The newspaper's Robin Oliver agreed that at the time Nine was a "strategic high-flyer" and had used the detective series to "build its program schedule". McFadyen hoped viewers would get used to watching the show, in a similar way to how the board game had entered public consciousness. The show's board game origins were often referred to; People described it as "the board game that became a series". The show helped Nine Network comply with the Australian Broadcasting Authority's Television Program Standard which aimed to increase transmission of Australian content and first run drama programs.

The Sydney Morning Herald thought Cluedo could be a huge ratings winner due to the public's fascination with murder. The Canberra Times wrote in June that "assuming Cluedo works, ratings wise, we shouldn't really expect any major changes to the show." Channel Nine expected to attract around 3 million viewers.The Sun-Herald predicted the series would cause a ripple effect for Parker Brothers which distributes the board game in Australia, noting a 23% increase for the British edition when their version of the game show aired. The Sun-Herald thought that in addition to the studio audience, thousands of people would take part from their lounge rooms. By March, it was anticipated the one hour show would air on weeknights at 7:30pm. Though the series was originally expected to air in April, the 13 episodes of the first series began airing on the Nine Network on 10 June 1992. It was the third of Nine's new prime-time programs.

In early May, the network commissioned a second series of 12 or 13 episodes before the first series had debuted the following month in June. On 11 May, Nine's network programmer, Ross Plapp noted that the cast "should remain the same" and advised that "negotiations are under way". TV Week thought the move "surprising" due to Nine Network not yet knowing the viewers' response to the first series. The network revealed that after viewing some of the programs, they were confident of the series' success and had "big hopes" for Cluedo. Specifically, Plapp explained that after viewing some of the programs the network was "sure the series is a goer", and decided it seemed sensible to continue with production "while everyone was 'on the boil'". Despite causing scheduling conflicts, Daddo was "rapt" about Cluedo's renewal and he and McFadyen were both keen to take part in the second series.

Additional to the calculation was Nine's recent ratings success; by the end of May 1992, the network had won 12 of the 13 weeks of survey and was leading the most recent week on 33.2. The Sydney Morning Herald agreed this decision suggested the network "display[ed] admirable...confidence in its new product", and The Age suggested the network must have been pleased due to the premature greenlighting of a second series. Crawfords also expected to be financially rewarded through overseas sales or rights – by the beginning of June a German version was about to begin production and there was interest from the US, France, New Zealand, Sweden, Japan, Singapore, and Denmark.

Crawfords began production of the second series on 15 June after taping the live portion of the first series' 13 episodes in front of a studio audience. TV Week noted that McFadyen and Daddo were "under pressure" with a "mammoth workload" due to overlapping production schedules with their other projects – sitcoms Bingles, Let The Blood Run Free, and Newlyweds for the former and a Scottish ghost character in the $3.7 million series Round the Twist's for the latter. Series two began airing on 6 January 1993 with the episode Busy Body, and on 27 January Cluedo replaced a repeat airing of Jana Wendt On Assignment which had been axed after a single episode.

=== Ratings ===
Premiering weekly at 7:30pm on Wednesday nights at the conclusion of the 1992 State of Origin series, the show replaced "flop" Star Trek: The Next Generation (1987) which was moved to the 11:30pm Thursday timeslot for its sixth season According to Sunday Times, this decision to remove Star Trek elicited "great resistance from 'the faithful'". Having waited for the Origin season to end, Nine introduced Cluedo as a Wednesday evening hopeful. Of the 10 June premiere "A Fete Worse Than Death", The Sydney Morning Herald reported the series opened at 21 points (a total of 259,140 Sydney homes), just beating Channel Seven sitcoms Hey Dad..! and Home Improvement, and also bested these two programs to win its slot in Perth "with considerable ease". However, measured by audience the show did not finish in the top 25 programs.

Cluedo's first episode ultimately reached 26th in the ratings in Sydney and Melbourne. The second episode peaked at 23rd. The newspaper reported that demographic data showed the series mostly appealing to the 40-plus age group, in contrast with Seven's sitcoms which were strong with women in the 18-29 age bracket. Another newspaper wrote the show was "doing quite well", alongside Nine's other new prime-time shows, and was "filling the network with great glee". Fidgeon noted, "what does it matter what a grumpy little reviewer thinks" when the show is performing well and people are watching.

The Herald-Sun wrote it was an "innovative concept", and suggested the production team would be satisfied with a "healthy" debut, though wondered if viewers would "stay with it", deeming it a "disappointing deliverer that scored well with viewers". The Sunday Sun-Herald deemed it a "splendid performer" though questioned how long it could maintain the interest and high ratings on its current format; still it concluded the show was innovative and "definitely deserves a far go".

Mark Wallace of The Canberra Times felt that Cluedo "showed enough in its debut...to warrant another look". The Sydney Morning Herald suggested the ratings success was proof "that people will watch anything", while The Herald-Sun thought the "greed" of viewers at home would keep them watching. On 24 June, "Palms of an Architect" came third in its timeslot after The 7.30 Report (22 points) and Hey Dad..!. On 5 July, Sunday Herald-Sun reported "it's good to see Cluedo holding on to those ratings points and no doubt heartening for Crawfords", noting that with The Flying Doctors off the air and Acropolis Now on repeats it otherwise seemed to be a quiet time for the production company, contrasting it with Crawford's earlier history which had competing successful police dramas across channels.

The episode on 8 July, "Goodwill to All Men," opened on 17 points, but dropped to 14 and 15. In the Canberra television ratings survey 28 June to 25 July, the series reached 16 points down from 18, the best Wednesday night programme for WIN excluding state-of-origin rugby league matches. After four of the 13 shows had aired, Sunday Times wrote the program was "surprisingly...rapidly gaining an audience" despite the earlier resistance and The Sunday Age reported the series was "attracting high ratings"; in October the latter newspaper reported the show had "more than lived up to the network's expectations".

Still, by July The Sydney Morning Herald noted the show was "declining in popularity" and while not "dangerously low of ratings", it struggled to "fill the extra 17 minutes needed for a commercial hour" and as a result risked boredom. The newspaper recommended the show revert to the British format, shortening it to 30 minutes, then to "scrap the audience, hire hand-picked celebrity sleuths and save on trips to Micronesia". The following year, Moran retrospectively felt the 1992 series had been a "lucky break" for Crawfords, whose major series at the time, The Flying Doctors and Acropolis Now, would both be cancelled by the end of the year.

== Cancellation and aftermath ==
=== Australian cancellation ===
The Australian Broadcasting Tribunal announced in July 1992 that the industry had recorded its worst year in 1990-91. That month, in the midst of agreeing to host a second series of Cluedo, McFadyen became involved in an expensive legal battle which "continue[d] to plague [him]" and according to TV Week "soured [his] current career success". In an interview, The Sunday Age reported the series "seemed far from his mind" and that the project was "finished as far as his work is concerned", as his attention turned to the second Newlyweds pilot for Channel Seven. In August 1992, TV Week reported that the network "abruptly removed" the show from its schedule with three episodes left unaired, reportedly to retain them as a lead-in to its second series to be aired in 1993; meanwhile production of a third series was in negotiation stages.

On 20 September, Crawford Australia announced it had started retrenching staff to survive a possible five-month break until production picked up in 1993, having suffered from the recession, commercial television network difficulties, and the 10BA tax concession scheme drop; at the time Crawfords did not know if Nine would commission another series of Cluedo, with its other shows Acropolis Now, Newlyweds and The Flying Doctors all cancelled or in limbo. However, on 29 November, The Sydney Morning Herald reported the series had been "rescued from the discard basket" alongside The Flying Doctors and Raven, and on December 2, The Age reported it was "set to return" for a third series.

Ultimately, the show was cancelled after two series; most of series one had aired in June–August 1992 and series two in 1993, though episodes continued to be broadcast into 1994 and 1995. Meanwhile, British Cluedo's final episode aired on 24 May 1993. Jocks' Journal assessed the Australian series as "short-lived", and The Sun-Herald admitted that it "wasn't exactly a ratings winner" for Channel Nine. While in February 1993 McFadyen followed up Cluedo with his Crawfords-Media Arts coproduction Newlyweds, which was advanced to series, Crawfords' association with Action Time ultimately did not continue past Cluedo.

Writing on Cluedo's cancellation, The Age suggested it may have been challenging to "get people hooked" as the show had a "steep learning curve", requiring the viewers to concentrate for a whole hour. The newspaper also felt that the team of writers and directors that worked on Cluedo among others, created shows that were "dramatically vapid, jumbled, corny and generally uninvolving", resulting in poor audience figures. (Other series referred to include Cop Shop (1977), Chances (1991), Secrets (1993), and The Flying Doctors). Moran thought the audience participation padded out the running time, contrasting it with earlier Crawfords series Consider Your Verdict.

Lawrie Masterson of TV Weekly thought that adapting the "old, tried and true" board game for television "sounds easy", as the concept of a "variety of colourful-sounding" murder suspect, a "myriad" of genuine clues and red herrings, and a final reveal had "all the elements of mischievous fun"; though in practice it "obviously it wasn't easy at all" as the fun of interactively "pitting your wits" against the other players in the board game is robbed when passively staring at the screen for the duration of the show.

By 1995 The Age had deemed it a "failed" show and in 1996 The Sydney Morning Herald wrote that the public reaction to both Cluedo and Newlyweds was "tepid". Decades later, Junkee deemed it part of Australia's "weird" television landscape from the 90's. In 2014, the Australian version of Cluedo would be listed in a Herald Sun article called 'Classic TV shows we used to love that would never fly today'; the newspaper wrote it was a "bold concept for its time" and more successful in Britain where it originated, but "never struck a chord with enough viewers".

=== British cancellation ===
Upon its announcement, The Financial Times expressed surprise at the concept and questioned whether its participants "had more pride" than to take part, wondering if a televised snakes and ladders would be next. Evening Herald felt it "pales disappointingly in comparison" to the board game, deeming it "trite", "stilted", "obvious", and "crass" for "trying to convince its audience what a good time they're having and how much their brains are being stretched". On 25 July 1990, John Chambers of Evening Herald admitted that while he was planning to watch, "it could be utterly awful, then again that could be its true appeal". That month, Sandwell Evening Mail surmised that in attempting to convert one of the most popular board games to television, the result revealed the game's boringness to millions of viewers, and was caricaturisish for instance featuring a "panto-style ya-boo exchange" with the 'grand jury' studio audience. Aberdeen Evening Express wrote the series "reduced a popular board game to a travesty of amateurish dramatics", criticising the "third-rate reconstructions and awful lineup of has-been personalities [with] careers dead and buried long ago" which "provided even less tension than an average session of the cardboard original" and "deliver[ing some rather ropey, semi-improvised dialogue"; the newspaper further commented "the board game’s strength lies in exercising the mind to imagine the crime, its motives and execution in a limited environment, but any hint of mystery was lost as the TV form flabbily fleshed the whole thing out to no advantage".

Having not played Cluedo since a child, watching a few episodes of this series encouraged Daily Mirror to add the old board game to their Christmas shopping list, noting it had been "translated to television wonderfully well" and guessing that "viewers are enjoying it as much as the cast". While initially fearing the idea might become Cluedon't when board moved to screen, Daily Mirror found the series to be "terrific fun", due to the way Beacham "flounced, quivered and pouted, sending herself up wonderfully", and how Whitfield "frowned, quivered and sulked with her usual comic genius", adding "the rest of the cast weren't rubbish either" and that the "dull bits were the guessings by celebrity 'detectives'". Miss Marple fan Lynda Gilby of Sunday Life felt "what should have been a glorious romp, lacked style". In September, Birmingham Mail positively compared it to the "dismal failure" of Trivial Pursuits, citing Leahy's philosophy of avoiding physical game boards in the TV studio that players sat around, criticising the latter's complex overly-lit board, long rolls of the dice ala Sporting Triangles, and rounds often ending from an invisible clock rather than skill. Upon the series one finale, the newspaper assessed in August assessed that while the "corn[y]...ham acting scenes fail to stir your imagination", the show had "the best opening sequence of any programme on the box at the moment", and concluded that the show had done well enough in the ratings to justify second series. Similarly, Birmingham Weekly Mercury assessed the "fun" show "deserves another series". felt the TV version "pales disappointingly" in comparison with the "great" board game, suggesting that with the celebrity cast "you'd expect better...but the whole package is too trite and stilted, crassly trying to convince its audience what a good time they're having and how much their brains are being stretched by the whole experience".

By April 1991 Evening Herald thought the "awful" spin-off had given the original board game a "very bad name", and surmised that "most of the murdering" during the "laboured" first series was "done by the TV critics". North Wales Weekly News, wrote "What a pity such a talented cast are handed such an inane script to deal with" and added "if the writers could sharpen up this series would have real potential". Meanwhile Liverpool Echo felt the show succeeded due to melding a popular board game with celebrity actors, dramatic costumes, and a "breath-taking" backdrop. In June, Punch magazine suggested that the ratings successes of shows like Cluedo, That's Life!, and You've Got To Be Joking demonstrated that "viewers are quite content with nonstop junk". In March 1992, Ogilvy and Mather Media research groups saw Cluedo get a "resounding thumbs down". In May, Sunday Times' Sally Pyne thought Cluedo turned the board game into a passive "couch potato operation" with television sleuths doing all the work. The series three premiere had received an official complaint.

In April 1993, Bristol Evening Post asserted that the showbusiness chat show Bruce's Guest Night would "have to keep the star names coming in" for host Bruce Forsyth to "beat off the ratings challenge from our favourite TV whodunnit game show Cluedo". In May, Daily Mirror described it as a "silly, but highly entertaining" game show. In June, Financial Times questioned whether television's "perpetual obsession with the criminal" created a public fear of crime, citing Cluedo aired the same night as other "real crime" shows Horizon, It's a Stitch-up, Porridge, Mr Inside/Mr Outside, Hard Shoulder, Cagney & Lacey, and a Panorama episode about Salvatore Riina. Aberdeen Evening Express thought the show "reduced a popular board game to a travesty of amateurish dramatics" and that the "little plastic pieces" of the board game gave more realistic performances than the cast, though admitted by 1993 that "that's not the point" and recommended the light entertainment show. Liverpool Echo felt Cluedo would be "ideal fodder for doctors waiting rooms". In July, Sunday Mirror announced that the show had been cancelled by ITV director Marcus Plantin in a company-wide review of gameshows in the aftermath of the success of "wacky" Channel 4 show The Big Breakfast due to him wanting a "whole new look for daytime television", with other casualties including Runway, Lucky Ladders and Pyramid (game show); at the time Cluedo was attracting viewership of up to 10 million per episode. An ITV source stated, "Cluedo has run its course as a game show. A lot of people thought it wasn't very good anyway".

In 1994, Lynne Truss of The Times wrote the British adaption was "not a great success" and the newspaper's Andrew Pierce later wrote it ended up in the "television graveyard" alongside Tarrant's version of Pop Quiz (1994). In reference to Madeley's hosting of the "superb" daytime quiz show Runway,The Independent noted his "not quite so impeccable (and recently axed)" Cluedo. TV Cream Toys suggested that despite breaking through on ITV primetime and "churn[ing] out" four series, Britain's Cluedo suffered a "ratings haemorrhage". In 2011, Lumley wrote the "small" television series had "disappeared too soon". In 2021, CST Online noted the British version was not nominated for any BAFTAs.

==== British legacy ====
However Rattan suggested the show received strong viewers figures, being watched by up to ten million people. In May 1992, Irish Examiner noted the series "regularly tops the ratings", and in 1995 Evening Echo described it as a "top rating programme". One of the Cluedo's best performances was 9.62 million viewers in series three, the 14th most ITV show of the night. The show was deemed Pick of the Day by The Sunday Times in August 1990, and the newspaper pondered how an "old" board game could have "weathered its transformation" into a television series "so successfully". Also Evening Echo's Pick of the Day in April 1991, the newspaper described it as a "popular" show based on an "equally-popular" board game; Belfast Telegraph called it an "exciting" whodunnit. According to The Age, the British programme became hit in the United Kingdom and, to a lesser extent, the United States.

The show also had cache; according to her biography Lorraine Kelly "started taking a few steps up the celebrity ladder" by appearing alongside fellow TV personalities. Series four consisted of panellists such as a children's TV presenter, a weather forecaster, and an ex-Leader of the Liberal Party. On 12 July 1990, a special featurette on the filming of the series was aired as part of This Morning, and a cast interview featured on Good Morning Britain in May 1992. The British Television Location Guide noted that the show's popularity led to a rise in Arley Hall's attendance figures from Cluedo fans. The space would be reused by Granada for future projects including as exterior shots for The House of Windsor in 1994.

While the Australian production utilised advertising to subsidise its budget, Kate O'Mara wore diamonds worth £3 million in the British Cluedo Christmas special, and for the six episodes of British series two, Mrs. Peacock actress Rula Lenska was expected to earn £30,000. However, Stephanie Beacham wore "cheap-and-nasty" jewellery for her role including a bracelet that was kept together by a thin piece of cotton that was hurriedly stitched on. In August 1994, British Miss Scarlett (Jerry Hall) and Mrs. Peacock's (Joanna Lumley) costumes went on show at the Bowes Museum as part of a television-based exhibit, arranged by textilist Joanna Hashagen. A matching wig for Lumley's outfit was submitted by a Teesdale Mercury reporter after an appeal was printed in the paper. After being displayed in the museum for weeks and generating a lot of interest, they were auctioned off on 26 November, with proceeds going to the Save The Children Fund for its 75th anniversary. In a 1999 article on the 50th anniversary of the Cluedo franchise, the TV show only received a passing mention in relation to its featured celebrities.

=== International cancellation ===
In January 1992, The Sun-Herald reported that Crawfords had been approached by numerous European countries who wished to produce the Australian version of the game show, adapting their scripts and some of their concepts. Multiple international adaptions would be produced including Italy's Il delitto è servito (1992–3), Germany's Cluedo – Das Mörderspiel (1993), France's Cluedo (1994–5), Portugal's Cluedo (1995), and Sweden's Cluedo – en mordgåta (1996). None of these shows enjoyed the longevity of the original and similar sentiments were shared on these other versions. CST Online argued the international adaptions had short shelf-lives as "the whole premise and execution are so quintessentially English".

Of the Italian version's cancellation, host Maurizio Micheli suggested the concept invited poor ratings from the teletheater [it] format being unpopular and the genre only appealing to "people of good taste". (Note: Teletheater is a type of teledramaturgy in which actors stage plays that are recorded live, in front of an audience, and this staging is transmitted as a television program.) Telecapri News agreed that poor ratings led to cancellation. Still, Maurizio Micheli thought Cluedo was "well packaged by prominent writers and actors", admitted that "strange to say, it's a smart quiz"; Orgoglionerd agreed that in Cluedo, deduction, intelligence and attention-to-detail are key.

La Stampa deemed it "an agile and fast program that you can watch without dying of boredom", and "simply a good product with an extra idea, which is now very rare", concluding it was a "refreshing little program, a nice little surprise". Italian newspaper La Repubblica wrote that "the whole program is quite pleasant", Each episode saw a crime committed at the six-room Villa dei Castagni. while Teatro e Musica News wrote Il delitto è servito was a "beautiful program". Orgoglionerd thought it is program where "deduction, intelligence and attention to detail were the masters". Radiocorriere thought the show offered a "very complicated story".

Toutelatele.com thought France 3 opted to adapt Cluedo for French television due to the channel "lacking originality and wanting to exploit a trend", likening it to 1988's Trivial Pursuit (predating the UK and US gameshows and adapted from the board game) and 1989's Dessinez, c’est gagné (adapted from US gameshow Win, Lose or Draw which was based on board game Pictionary). Home viewers could participate via Minitel or phone to win prizes, clues were hidden in Télé-Loisirs and game grids were detachable from the magazine's pages.

Unsatisfied with the first two episodes, France 3 executives asked for a new version of the game which replaced cast and altered gameplay; these changes were not successful and after four episodes the show was cancelled. 20 years after the single series Swedish version aired, Villanytt asked "who doesn't remember" the show, and Daniel Hånberg Alonso of Filmkultur recalled Cluedo as "very entertaining". In 2015, TV4 advised they had no intention of re-running the series.

Quotenmeter thought the German version was one of the "innovative", "crazy", "kitschy", "tasteless" and "unconventional" shows that producer Stefan Fuchs brought to channel Sat.1 during his tenure, though noted they "often developed into big audience favourites". Alsterfilm Productions hosted the show on its site in 2013, and wrote that despite featuring well-known actors, the format was "not particularly successful".

=== Aftermath ===
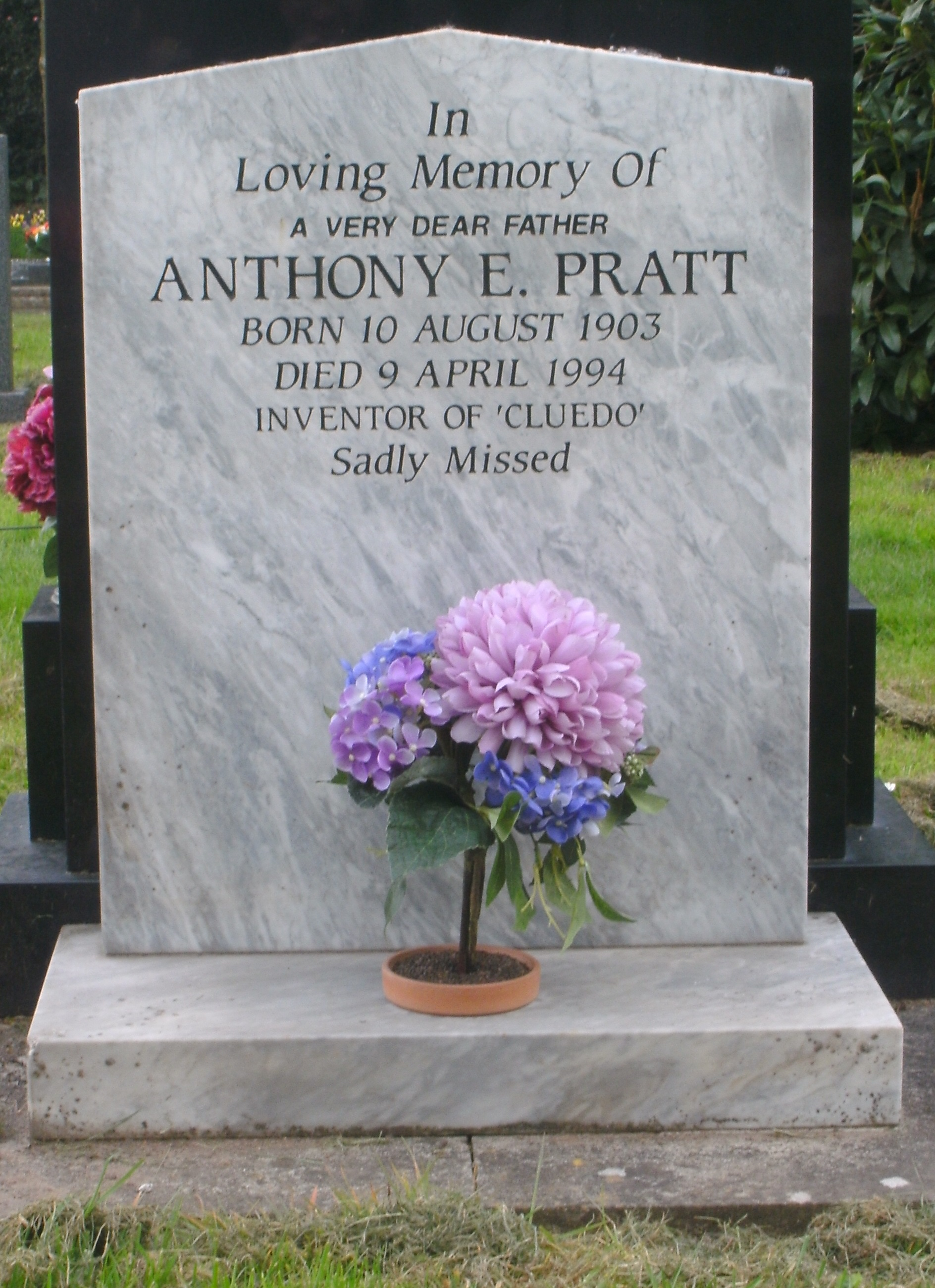
Gravestone of Cluedo inventor, Anthony E. Pratt. The success of the game shows was partly responsible for the search for Pratt's identity in 1996.

Cluedo was featured in Albert Moran's Moran's Guide To Australian TV Series (1993), a scholarly guide to Australian TV series, which described Cluedo in the introduction as a "problematic anomal[y]" to the definition of drama, and a recent example of a genre hybrid. In 1994 Action Time completed a U.S. network deal for the Cluedo format and that year a full-motion video spiritual successor of Cluedo was released on the CD-i, filmed in the same location as the British game show and featuring a reprise of Joan Sims' Mrs. White. CDi Magazine wrote the experience was "like taking part in your own murder mystery on TV".

That year, the BP ldentiphysics Challenge final, a schools' game show based on Cluedo promoting STEM subjects, took place in which contestants deduced which of six fictional scientists worked in which laboratory using which piece of equipment to make a particular discovery. In 1995, disco and snooker company European Leisure released "amusement with prizes" machines called Maygay Machines, based on TV programmes like Gladiators, EastEnders and Cluedo, earning £402,000 profit within six months. In the lead-up to the 150 millionth sale of Cluedo, in 1996 Waddingtons began a hunt to find out the identity of the elusive creator of the board game; it was eventually revealed Anthony E. Pratt had passed two years earlier of natural causes, and that he did not make a substantial amount of money from the game unlike Monopoly's creator.

Over the next few decades the Cluedo franchise would continue to experiment with story-driven brand extensions with a stage musical (1997), computer game (1999), live-action miniseries (2011), stage play (2018), and upcoming film; however many including the stage play have instead drawn inspiration from the 1985 film. Meanwhile, other whodunnit game shows would follow in Cluedo's footsteps including Sleuth 101 (2010) in Australia and Armchair Detectives (2017) in Britain.

After the show was taken off the air, DAMsmart completed a digitisation project for WIN Corporation and Crawford Productions, digitising Australian television series from the 60's to the 90's. On 1 May 2005, Crawford Productions donated their main archive including 328 x 1-inch videos of television programs to the National Film and Sound Archive (NFSA) when the production company closed their Box Hill site. Based in Canberra, the collection houses Cluedo televised episodes and scripts.

The remainder of the collection was accepted by the Australian Film Institute (AFI) Research Collection. Established by AFI as a library in 1978, the Collection is still owned by AFI subsidiary Australian Academy of Cinema and Television Arts (AACTA), though it is presently on loan to RMIT University in Melbourne. The Cluedo materials within the Crawfords Collection include script drafts, production stills, press kits, magazine and newspaper clippings, logos, and location shots.

No DVD or digital release of the Australian game show has been made, and only bootleg copies are known to exist. Although in 2015, Australian fansite Cluedofan tweeted that 12 episodes of the series were to be uploaded to YouTube in the near future.

== Cast ==
=== Main cast ===
The hour-long show was hosted by Ian McFadyen and featured a regular cast who played the six suspects, plus an additional character Detective-Sergeant Stanley Bogong who solves the crime. In-universe, Mrs. Peacock, Miss Scarlet, and Professor Plum live at Brindabella Homestead, while Colonel Mustard, Reverend Green, and Mrs. White live nearby. Despite being only "loosely based" on the board game, these characters are taken directly from the original. The show's British analogue "hauled in lovely people to play the well-known characters" according to Britain's Mrs. Peacock, Joanna Lumley. The British press put the "high level of talent the show can attract" down to Cluedo being a game that most households grew up with. Their version attracted household names like Lumley, June Whitfield, Mollie Sugden, Tom Baker, and Pam Ferris as main suspects.

According to Aberdeen Evening Express it attracted "deities of the light entertainment world", while TV Times magazine noted the co-stars would be familiar to viewers from "top TV series", Irish Press and Evening Herald noted the show boasted a host of top-name British celebrities. Belfast Newsletter thought viewers would be "wrack[ing] their brains trying to work out why housekeeper Mrs White's face was so familiar". Stephanie Beacham was persuaded to play Mrs. Peacock in order to work alongside a strong cast, particularly June Whitfield whom she admired. Unlike the British version in which "the faces change but the characters remain the same", the Australian actors were consistent across the two series. The Canberra Times agreed that Cluedo featured a "cast of top-class Australian actors". Of the seven main cast members (excluding McFadyen), five previously appeared in either Prisoner or Cop Shop which were thematically linked to their Cluedo roles of "cold-blooded killers".

Of the British version, Colonel Mustard actor Lewis Collins spoke on the "tremendous rapport" that the actors enjoyed together. Paull loved playing Vivien and commented on the family-like "strong, close relationships" she shared with the cast and crew. Similarly, in 1992 a reporter noted that Daddo and Westmore "clearly enjoyed making the program", while Badler described the role as "good fun". June Whitfield said of her British Mrs. White character, "I'm very proud of her...it's been great fun to do". TV Week admitted, "they all seem to enjoy themselves immensely". The Newcastle Herald described it as a "melodrama". The show gave the characters an opportunity to "ham it to the max". The character names have some "nice" double entendres, according to The Age.

Conversely, Sunday Times described the parts as "bread-and-butter work" and noted the cast were playing cliches; The Sydney Morning Herald agreed that the main cast "lend considerable panache to the essential archness of their roles". The Age suggested that both the Australian and British versions encouraged the cast to play their roles "over the top", and admitted they were a "jolly collection of actors providing fine ham" who "act their heads off and provide innocent amusement for the rest of us". Scarlett actress Koo Stark described the series as "great fun—over the top, instant emotion". Liverpool Echo thought British series four actors played their roles with "amateur dramatic gusto" and could start "new careers in children's television". David McCallum, who played Professor Plum in the British version noted, "this is not the Royal Shakespeare Company but it still requires technique. It's not overacting and it's not underacting. It's just slightly over the top". Farmer thought the show was a "vehicle for caricature", pointing to a rock musician character who bites the heads of chickens. Sandwell Evening Mail questioned why "such fine actresses...chose to get involved in such a corny show". Sunday Life noted in the British premiere the show's "starry cast" played their roles straight and "boring", with only Beacham "elegantly overplay[ing]" her tongue-in-cheek performance.

Britain's Miss Scarlett Lysette Anthony felt Cluedo was enjoyable to play because of its camp style. Paull recalled the "hugely entertaining" series required a "specific style of melodramatic acting" featuring large, exaggerated performances. Tarrant noted "the producers kept telling me not to be silly" as if it was a "serious...courtroom drama", but "the whole premise was ludicrous". Westmore agreed that the show was tongue-in-cheek and "not terribly serious", and Sunday Herald-Sun described the acting as "over-the-top fun". Mallaby noted "this is completely outrageous over the top" and added the cast was "really enjoying it". To Badler, bringing Agatha Christie stereotypes to caricatured life appealed to her "sense of fun", noting the cast were "camped up and tongue-in-cheek". Paull hoped the show was "as much fun to watch as it is to make". Birmingham Weekly Mercury thought the show was "held together with the improvised camp of its stars". Daily Mirror felt the cast "camped it up wonderfully in scenes of anguish and intrigue", and are "hamming it up like mad and must relish the opportunity". Bristol Evening Post assessed the show was "ludicrously over-the-top", though felt Lumley was "in great shape" in her role as Peacock.

Who magazine admitted the main cast "ham it up shamelessly". Aberdeen Evening Express described the show as "hilariously camp" and a "witty send-up" of the whodunnit, noting in series four Lumley was the "flawless...star of the show" as a "hysterically OTT" Mrs. Peacock; while Belfast Newsletter agreed Lumley's turn could never be described as "boring". The Guardian noted that on the same day Lumley was nominated for the award, she travelled to Manchester to film an episode of the British version, noting a "curious lack of ambition" and being "somewhat indiscriminate in her choice of roles". British Miss Scarlett Tracy Ward called it a "nice little job to do".

Upon seeing the British premiere, The Guardian's Nancy Bank-Smith felt the show's past-prime actors overacted and under rehearsed, particularly criticising the French accent of guest actor Oliver Tobias. Daily Mirror agreed that the character "launched the worst slicked-back hairdo since Curly's in Coronation Street and the worst French accent since the Good Moaning policeman's in 'Allo 'Allo!". Rattan suggested that "even where the basic characters were flawed...the quality of the actors made up for it"; he noted his only involvement with the casting as "just making suggestions" and that the actor chosen for Professor Plum in the British series one as being younger than his conception of the character.

==== Ian McFadyen ====
Ian McFadyen played himself, the host of the series. After Crawfords asked him, McFadyen immediately accepted the offer to host Cluedo, though he had initially been hoping for a career opportunity stemming from his sketch show The Comedy Company, which had ended in 1990. By March 1992, McFadyen was working on Cluedo alongside a Channel Ten show Bingles. The latter show had been originally designed for the male members of Comedy Company, but by this time the others had wandered off to other projects while McFadyen was left with a "pitifully small budget” after the network went into receivership. McFadyen was "thrilled" by the thought of hosting an "intellectual" game show, though admitted to initially feeling "quite daunted" by the prospect of hosting a show with "such a huge number of contestants".

Having been drawn to suit-wearing straight men earlier in his career, most recently the news anchors of The Comedy Company, McFadyen appreciated Cluedo over regular game shows with "spinning boards and some girl in a tight skirt". Prior to his casting, McFadyen had completed a Diploma of Criminology at the University of Melbourne and had developed a passion for Hitchcock films. A sketch in the satirical current affairs show Frontline quipped that he was the "ideal" host for the former reason. This fact was frequently referred to in the press, for instance TV Week agreed his criminology degree plus background in comedic television made him "ideal for the situation" while The Newcastle Herald noted the ironic nature of this. McFadyen also noted that "luckily" he owned a large range of suits for the role.

During his time on the show, he was focused on producing his Newlyweds pilots and considered himself "simply the front man" of Cluedo. TV Week noted that the show, alongside McFadyen's projects Bingles and Newlyweds, saw him "bounce back" after a "disappointing end" to The Comedy Company. He described hos Cluedo persona on as "sort of a cross" between lawyer Geoffrey Robertson and talk-show host Phil Donahue, though Cockington felt he came across as Count Dracula actor Bela Lugosi mixed with a dance hall crooner, informed by his "brilliantined hair". The Sydney Morning Herald's James Cockington described his role as a "straight man in a crazy, mixed-up, murder-a-minute world", noting that the former The Comedy Company alumni would not be delivering laughs.

The Sunday Age deemed him the "total antithesis" of television presenter Jimmy Hannan, and that heading the show with his "university lecturer" presence was a courageous move for commercial television; the newspaper added, "he is also shortish and stocky and wears glasses that make him look like an offended owl". Described as a "benevolent mediator" by Who magazine's Gerri Sutton, Sunday Herald-Sun noted McFadyen "kept moving things along" and described his performance as "funereal". TV Week jokingly wrote that McFadyen looks "about as comfortable in the role as Andrew Daddo looks like a genuine professor".

The Age assessed his performance as a "passable imitation of an undertaker" while The Sydney Morning Herald thought he "seems ill at ease", further described the compere as "looking most Barry Humphries-like in 1940s waistcoat, slicked back hair and eyeglasses" and a "cross between Sherlock Holmes and Freddie from Elm Street". However, the newspaper acknowledged that the show demands a "way-over-the-top, high camp manner" which McFadyen delivered with expressive eye movement. Badler thought he was charismatic and "very good at what he does".

==== Mrs. Peacock ====
Forty year old Mrs. Elizabeth Peacock is the thrice-married owner of Brindabella. Born in the United States and having married twice prior, she met her third husband Alan Scarlet while he was on a business trip after his wife's death. They married and returned to live at Brindabella, the Western District property his father had built in the small village of Creswick Falls. Having had a humble upbringing, this marriage gave Elizabeth a life of wealth, class, and style. (Note: These are the character names and descriptions as they appear in a Cluedo production character notes sheets from 14 February 1992.)

After Alan Scarlet died, Elizabeth remarried Mr. Peacock but he soon died in mysterious circumstances. Since then Mrs. Peacock has had courtships with numerous men, many of whom she competes with her step-daughter Miss Scarlet over. She maintains a long-standing relationship with Colonel Mike Mustard. Living in a small community, Mrs. Peacock has close contact with the Reverend Green, and she offers financial support for his parish work. With a murky past and having married into a wealthy family, Peacock's main driver is positive external perception as she didn't come from a high society background, and "there are great lengths she will go to keep her name from being blackened".

Jane Badler played Mrs. Peacock. Badler found Cluedo working conditions jarring compared to the star system of the United States, noting "no one had their own trailer or dressing room...there were no frills in acting here, just your craft". At the time, she was best-known to Australian audiences as lizard alien Diana in the science fiction series V (1985) and femme fatale Shannon Reed in a remake of Mission: Impossible (1988) which had been filmed in Australia. Soon after its cancellation in 1990 she permanently moved from Los Angeles to Australia and married an Australian businessman and became pregnant; after taking a sabbatical she decided to get back into acting and had her agent send a tape to Crawfords.

Badler recalled, "I went in to test for this role and I got it. It's really a perfect role for me". By production, Badler had to juggle her new-born son with her work. She thought it was "completely different" to other work she had done and described the mature socialite as "daffy" and "prissy" and "not a young spirit"; furthermore she deemed Mrs. Peacock a "comic" character. The Newcastle Herald further described Peacock as a "social queen" and "glamorous toff". Badler donned heavy make-up to age her for the character which she had to get comfortable with. Former Dynasty star Stephanie Beacham left her beachside Californian home to play Mrs. Peacock in rainy Cheshire for UK's series one. She described her character as "silly" and a "monster", and deemed her "so much fun" to play. Polish countess and actress Rula Lenska accepted the role following her divorce with Dennis Waterman the previous summer, and she reportedly earned around £30,000 for her series. Directly descended from Polish aristocracy, the actress commented of Arington Grange, "I would love to have lived in a stately home as the lady of the manor...My parents were very high aristocracy in Poland, but all of that was lost and forfeited during the war".

Announced to replace Lenska on 22 March 1992, Susan George "relish[ed]" tackling the role as her first major acting role after spending five years producing with her husband Simon MacCorkindale; the "glamorous" actress had previously been known for playing sultry roles in films like Straw Dogs. Four days later the actress broke her foot and sprained her ankle by falling down the stairs while filming at Arley Hall for series three of the British version having tripped over her high heels and long skirt; she returned to set after a week of convalesching. Evening Herald wrote the role was George's first in front of the cameras after five years. Sunday Mirror reported that in December 1993 Granada TV offered Joanna Lumley £20,000 to play the role and asked about her availability, but by January there were scheduling conflicts due to her show Absolutely Fabulous (co-starring with Jennifer Saunders) commencing filming in March at the same time as Cluedo's fourth series.. Sandwell Evening Mail suggested that one day Joan Collins might play the part.

==== Miss Scarlet ====
Twenty-five year old Miss Vivien Scarlet's mother died when she was a young girl. She and her father Alan Scarlet were very close and she resented any other women he spent time with. She left university to look after the family property when her father left for the States on business. When he returned with new wife Elizabeth she was distrustful but grew closer when Elizabeth comforted her after her father's death and through Elizabeth's short-lived marriage to Mr. Peacock.

The two women are tolerant of each other's romantic partners, though Miss Scarlet is most faithful to her boyfriend Professor Plum, who assists with upkeep and development of the property. Miss Scarlet would have inherited Brindabella had her father not remarried, and is financially dependent on Mrs. Peacock. Miss Scarlet prefers her old family friend "Whitey" (Mrs. White) to her own step-mother when in need of help. Flaunting herself before all eligible males, the "sexy" and "seductive" character desperately wants to become mistress of Brindabella. While the British board game and gameshow spelt the character's name as 'Scarlett', the Australian adaption renamed her to 'Scarlet' with a single 't'.

Nicki Paull played Miss Scarlet. Paull came to the series after having previously achieved fame in France with her role in drama series Return to Eden (1986). She had acted in numerous other Australian shows including Prisoner, G.P., and Acropolis Now. Having become jaded with acting, she briefly went to London and after returning home started a university degree, and took the role to earn a living while studying. Having never played the board game as a child, Paull considered the opportunity "making up for lost time". She was interested in Miss Scarlet due to having a chance to "play bad" and "enact amazing fantasies", describing her as a "terrible" "mean...nympho bitch" and "more of a bitch than a sex kitten" "heart throb", joking "it's the first time I've played someone so close to type". British Miss Scarlett Tracy Ward noted that at the time she wasn't professionally acting, and had left a rainforest conference at the Royal Geographical Society to attend the audition. Widely reported in media for being Prince Andrew's ex-girlfriend, Koo Stark came to the project after becoming emotionally drained from researching people's traumatic experiences for her photography book Survivors, and felt both "delighted" and "relieved" by the opportunity. Beacham described the character as a "trollop". The actress reportedly declined to mingle with other members of the cast at a press event and rarely lunched with them.

==== Mrs. White ====
Mrs. White is the long-time cook and housekeeper of Brindabella and has lived through its long history. After her own daughter died, she took on Miss Scarlet as a surrogate daughter and they became very close, nicknamed "Whitey" by her. After initial reservations, she grew close to the new mistress of Brindabella Mrs. Peacock, who treats her well. Mrs. White lives in a nearby cottage with her sickly husband Arthur, his poor health plays on her mind. She is disappointed that she will not be buried with the family on the property, rather in a small plot at Creswick Falls cemetery.

Joy Westmore played Mrs. Blanche White. Her most recent productions before working on the show were Embassy and Col'n Carpenter. Westmore expressed hesitation when first approached for the role, wondering how Crawford would successfully adapt the childhood game onto the screen. Recalling memories of playing the board game with her children, she thought it was an "odd choice". One episode saw Westmore murder a character played by former Prisoner co-star Beverley Dunn; Prisoner Officers and Inmates magazine observed it was reminiscent of a scene in the former show with the roles reversed. Westmore also reunited with Prisoner actress Lynda Stoner who played a hairdresser, and the magazine noted that in both shows Stoner was responsible for messing with Westmore's characters' hair.

Evening Standard described Whitfield as "go[ing] back to her roots" to play the "character actress" part of Mrs. White. Whitfield had devised that her character was born in the North as Blanche Postlethwaite before marrying Mr. White, and that while she's adopted Mrs. Peacock's "refrained" accent her Northern tongue comes out when tipsy. The character was known for being played by mature aged women; Whitfield, who was in her 50s at the time, was aged twenty years up for the role with a grey wig. Unlike the savvy Australian version, the British charactisation of Mrs. White was as a "dimwit". Granada TV reported that they approached Julie Walters to play the character in Series 4 for a salary of around £20,000, but her agents never received the contact.

Known for playing Mrs Slocombe in Are you Being Served? 20 years earlier, South Wales Echo noted the series was the first time the accomplished actress Mollie Sugden had starred in a murder plot; she enjoyed being able to play a role that wasn't pure comedy. While Sugden was "quite looking forward" to the role, she noted "the only problem is that sometimes when I'm sinister, I'm rather funny without meaning to be". Some of her Slocombe mannerisms were observed by the press, though her trademark rainbow hair was replaced by steely white for the role. She appreciated the challenge of this "unusual" production requiring her to remember Mrs White's actions to be able to answer testimony. Pam Ferris was announced as the third British Mrs. White on 25 March 1992 in The Sun; the actress was "easily persuaded to take time out" from her ITV The Darling Buds of May role, as her interest was sparked during Cluedo's first series watching her Connie costar Stephanie Beacham and she decided, "I really fancy having a go at that".

Main cast of Cluedo. From left to right: Jane Badler (Mrs. Peacock), George Mallaby (Colonel Mustard), Nicki Paull (Miss Scarlet), Andrew Daddo (Professor Plum), Joy Westmore (Mrs. White), Frank Gallacher (Detective Sergeant Bogong), Ian McFadyen (himself; host).

==== Professor Plum ====
Twenty-seven year old "Professor" Peter Plum hoped to use his intelligence to rise above his station. As a university student Plum became an expert on computers and architecture, did research on snakes, and traded on the stock market, leading him to be nicknamed "The Professor" by his classmates, a moniker he kept after graduation.

He soon became disillusioned why he hadn't found success. Miss Scarlet befriended Plum befriended at university, who after introducing to Mrs. Peacock was hired to upkeep and design renovations for the homestead. Plum lives on the premises and courts Miss Scarlet in the hopes that one days he will inherit the property. Miss Scarlett maintains as "amiable interest" in Plum.

Andrew Daddo played Professor Plum. Cluedo was one of Andrew Daddo's first roles upon returning from his one year stint in the United States as an MTV video jockey in September 1991, which he found to be professionally unfulfilling and lacking in constructive criticism leading to homesickness. The "heart throb" and "sex symbol of the show", in the lead-up to the premiere he was featured in the press for his relationship with model Jacquie Rindt. One of the cast members of the pilot to advance to series, Daddo deemed it the best job he'd had up until that point. He appreciated being involved in the project from the beginning rather than injecting himself into an established piece and being compared to his predecessor's reputations.

Daddo was the least experienced cast member according to The Daily Telegraph-Mirror. He admitted that during production he was still learning to act and felt the other six actors offered on-the-job training throughout the "apprenticeship". Daddo discovered that despite being the brother of established performer Cameron, acting was a taught skill and not innate to Daddos. In 1993, Daddo's production schedule overlapped with the children's series Round The Twist, in which he played a major role. He had "jumped at the chance" to take part in the show before he had commitments to a second series of Cluedo.

==== Colonel Mustard ====
Fifty-two year old Lieutenant Colonel (retired) Mike Mustard was a Western District local with a distinguished army career having served with the Australian Army in the Vietnam War. Ten years ago he retired and moved back home to live in the small township of Creswick Falls, within walking distance of Brindabella.

Since then he had built a strong romantic relationship with Mrs. Peacock, and spends most of his time at Brindabella. Mike Mustard is conservative and dismayed with youth culture. He is divorced and estranged from his daughter Jan. He does not like to talk about his military service.

George Mallaby played Colonel Mustard. Mallaby had previously played a detective-sergeant in Crawford's police procedural drama Homicide, and divided his time between a regular acting stint as Colonel Mustard and his business as a signwriter. A lucrative alternative earner during the times available roles were thin, he successfully maintained the business during Cluedo and moved his clients around to fit in with production of the first batch of episodes. Mallaby "relished" playing the "malevolent" character. Leslie Grantham used the British version to "cast aside the shades" of Dirty Den after playing him and struggling to find significant work post-Eastenders, a turn which The Times felt "smacked of desperation". TV Week anticipated the turn would "shock fans".

Grantham was the second actor from the show to guest star on Cluedo after Nick Berry, who noted the conventional wisdom that "there's no life after Eastenders and [cast members] are never heard from again". Lewis Collins' turn as Mustard was "true to form" of his machismo image, having previously played an SAS Captain in Who Dares Wins, and a "tough-nut" sleuth in Jack the Ripper.

==== Reverend Green ====
The Reverend Clement Ashley (Clem) Green claims to have moved to the local diocese due his fascination of a local rare species of blank-handed potoroos, though it is believed he relocated to the remote place to get away from his dark past. Away from the rigid church hierarchy of the city he is free to run the church in his own unique way. He is financially supported by Mrs. Peacock and a close friend of the family. While having compassion for all living creatures, the Reverend has a short temper. He seeks guidance from his Creator when unsure how to proceed.

Peter Sumner played Reverend Green. Sumner related to his character's love of animal causes due to being an animal liberationist and part of the anti duck shooting lobby, commenting "I believe absolutely in what the Rev Green feels about God's creatures...Rev Green is quite vehement in his defence of harmless creatures and I think he's absolutely right". The Sun-Herals described the character as "creepy". Sumner's car was stolen while completing publicity commitments for the show which resulted in a police case.

Richard Wilson came to the project after having directed An Inspector Calls on stage. Describing Reverend Green as a "super part", the "unsavoury...rakish" character was the third time Wilson had played a vicar after My Good Woman and Room At The Bottom, but he noted “I’ve never played such an unsavoury vicar before”. While he had never worked with any of the Cluedo cast before he noted “we’ve all supported each other hugely...when you’re away from home on location you tend to be very giggly and it's a bit like an outing”; in between takes he learnt golf from McCallum and yoga from Stark. The Inspector Morse fan said of Cluedo, “I haven't actually played the game for years but it's so intriguing that not one but all the Cluedo characters have shady pasts”; in real life Wilson is agnostic though he did teach Sunday school. On the consistency of his character between episodes, he noted, “I knew beforehand that my character had a devious past and that I was supposed to have had a tempestuous affair with a film star but I think we all have to bend a little to suit each script”. Comedian Christopher Biggins switched to contact lenses and shed two stone to rebrand himself in more serious roles like Reverend Green which he played in British series three. Nicholas Parsons said the series had “marvellous fun [with] great people to work with” and that “the little scenarios that we act out are beautifully written...it's wonderfully directed [with] an absolute dream cast". The show offered the actor a role at an age when other men would have retired.

==== Detective Sergeant Stanley Bogong ====
In his late forties, Detective Sergeant Stanley Bogong was orphaned as a baby and adopted by a policeman and his wife after becoming a ward-of-the-state. After entering his adoptive father's profession and working in the Homicide Squad for 1500 cases, he requested a transfer to the small village of Creswick Falls for a quiet life handing out speeding tickets, and was not expecting the frequent murders at Brindabella. He is known for his persistent investigation and interrogation methods, which help him solve the crime at hand. The "intrepid" character's role was to try to solve the "grisly...gruesome" murders and can't crack a case without the help of the studio audience and "eagle-eyed" home viewers, unlike other TV sleuths like Jessica Fletcher, Charlie Chan, and Father Dowling.

Frank Gallacher played Detective Sergeant Stanley Bogong. The week the show aired, Gallacher appeared as a villain in a stage version of Othello and a sleuth in Cluedo. A new character devised for the Australian version, Bogong's pre-recorded investigation of the crime scene "aims to shed more light on the murder mystery". Bogong is the only main character not to be implicated in each week's murder.

=== Guest cast ===
The show featured dozens of guest murder victims. Who magazine noted that a guest stint on Cluedo is guaranteed to be a one episode affair as the character is swiftly killed off. McFadyen commented that each part was a "wonderful guest role", and in June of that year The Sydney Morning Herald noted that Australian actors were "queuing up" for the "honour" of dying on the show. Miss Scarlet actress Nicki Paull also noted the quality of the guest cast. The Sydney Morning Herald wrote that veteran actor Rod Mulliner was "honoured" as the first corpse of the series. The guest names were often puns, for instance Janet Tipple was named for her love of drinking while Aunt Evelina is "evil by name and nature".

Three of the main cast had worked in television drama Prisoner (1979), and they reunited with multiple former castmates who were cast as victims. In addition to her Prisoner co-stars, Lynda Stoner reunited with George Mallaby with whom she shared screentime in Cop Shop. The Sydney Morning Herald commented on Simon Chilvers adding a "splendid slice of ham" as Harold Phelan.

The role came up a few months after Beverley Dunn finished up on The Flying Doctors and for her "it was nice to change gear and do something completely different", deeming it "huge fun" to play a woman who uses a wheelchair and "terrorises everyone at Christmas". With a love of playing nasty characters, Dunn thought "the script was super" and enjoyed being "given a license to be as evil as possible". She worked on developing her character's backstory to justify her resentment for Brindabella's residents – being thrown from a horse becoming disabled and losing her lover Mustard, being jealous of the life she could have had, then discovering a will that gives her everything she wants and wanting to cause revenge on those she perceives caused her pain.

Peter O’Brien's use of the appealing role as a follow-up to his "squeaky-clean" characters in Neighbours and The Flying Doctors to "re-establish a profile". Similar to Badler's experience, O'Brien noted a change from the "buss and professionalism" of the UK acting scene; the role resulted in him being apart from his wife Joanna Riding, noting "we’ve decided to stick by an agreement...we simply have to where the work is". The show saw Mark Eden's return to TV after the death of his Coronation Street character Alan Bradley 18 months prior, also for Granada Television.

In a "neat bit of casting" according to The Sun-Herald, one of the episodes featured guest star Cameron Daddo as Professor Plum's brother who acted with his real life younger brother and show regular Daddo. It marked the first time the brothers had acted together on television. Cameron "jumped at the chance" to play the "terrific" role. He hoped his on-screen chemistry with his brother would interest directors and producers, and reported that as a result of the episode Cluedo director Oscar Whitbread advised he was searching for a sibling role for them. A journalist anticipated Daddo's appearance would point the finger of suspicion at Professor Plum, played by Andrew. McFadyen also invited his wife, actress Mary-Anne Fahey, to be killed in an episode. The show was Mallaby's last regular role before his death.

== Episodes ==
=== Series 1 (1992) ===
No. in series	Title	Guest cast	Solution	Original release date	Production notes
1	"A Fete Worse Than Death"	Rod Mullinar as Frederick Stokes	Mrs. Peacock with the Brass Clock in the Study	10 June 1992	Written by Vince Moran and directed by Mark Defriest. Line produced by David Taft. Working title was 'Master of My Fete'. Episode 1 in production queue.
2	"A Nest of Vipers"	Caz Lederman as Janet Tipple	Col. Mustard with the Snake Venom in the Lounge	17 June 1992	Written by Vince Moran and directed by Mark Defriest. Line produced by David Taft. Episode 3 in production queue.
3	"Palms of an Architect"	Cameron Daddo as Roger Plum	Col. Mustard with the Pistol in the Kitchen	24 June 1992	Written by Tony Cavanaugh and directed by Oscar Whitbread. Line produced by David Taft. Working title was 'The Palms of an Architect'. Episode 5 in production queue.
4	"The Man Who Knew Too Much"	Tim Hughes as Robert Smale	Miss Scarlet with the Cushion in the Billiard Room	1 July 1992	Written by Graeme Farmer and directed by Oscar Whitbread. Line produced by David Taft. Episode 10 in production queue.
5	"Goodwill to All Men"	Beverley Dunn as Aunt Evalina	Mrs. White with the Letter Opener in the Billiard Room	8 July 1992	Written by Vince Moran and directed by Mark Defriest. Line produced by David Taft. Working title was 'Goodwill to All Men ... and Women'. Episode 6 in production queue.
6	"Madame Rosamonda"	Maggie Millar as Madame Rosamonda	Rev. Green with the Native Club in the Library	15 July 1992	Written by Vince Moran and directed by Mark Defriest. Line produced by David Taft. Working title was 'Madame Rosamonda'. Episode 2 in production queue.
7	"Greater Love Hath No Man"	Bernadette Walsh as Isabella Goodley; James Wright as Basil Goodley	Rev. Green with the BBQ Fork in the Billiard Room	22 July 1992	Written by Elizabeth Coleman and directed by Oscar Whitbread. Line produced by David Taft. Working title was 'Greater Love Hath No Man (Or Woman)'. Episode 4 in production queue.
8	"The First Lady"	Simon Chilvers as Harold Phelan	Miss Scarlet with the Weed Killer in the Study	29 July 1992	Written by Vince Moran and directed by Oscar Whitbread. Line produced by David Taft. Episode 9 in production queue.
9	"The Axeman Cometh"	Peter O'Brien as Warren 'Axeman' Hackett	Miss Scarlet with the Tuning Fork in the Billiard Room	5 August 1992	Written by Ray Boseley and directed by Mark Defriest. Line produced by David Taft. First and second drafts completed on 21 and 28 January 1992, respectively. Episode 8 in production queue.
10	"The Kiss Off"	Fiona Corke as Jan Mustard; Simon Westaway as David	Mrs. Peacock with the Figurine Blade in the Lounge	5 August 1995	Written by Tony Cavanaugh and script edited by Victoria Madden., directed by Mark Defriest. Line produced by David Taft. Final draft completed on 7 February 1992. Directed by Mark DeFriest and line produced by David Taft. Episode 7 in production queue.
11	"A Body To Die For"	Daniel Abineri as Dr. 'Gorgeous' George Guise	Prof. Plum with the Dumbbell in the Library	Unaired in series 1	Written by Victoria Madden and directed by Oscar Whitbread. Line produced by David Taft. Episode 12 in production queue.
12	"The Spy Who Came In With A Cold"	Linda Cropper as Matilda Mayberry	Col. Mustard with the Syringe in the Study	Unaired in series 1	Written by Karin Altmann and directed by Mark Defriest. Line produced by David Taft. Working titles were 'Bridge Over Troubled Waters' and 'The Spy Who Came in from the Cold'. Episode 13 in production queue.
13	"Still Life"	Adrian Wright as Charles Letan	Prof. Plum with the Meat Cleaver in the Billiard Room	Unaired in series 1	Written by Graeme Farmer and directed by Oscar Whitbread. Line produced by David Taft. Working title was 'Ars Longa, Vita Brevis'. Episode 11 in the production queue.

=== Series 2 (1993) ===
No. in series	Title	Guest cast (Victim)	Solution	Original release date	notes
14	"Busy Body"	Mary Ward as Great Aunt Angela Gribble	Mrs. White with the Step Ladder in the Library	6 January 1993	Episode 14 in production queue.
15	"Red Herring"	Tina Bursill as Billie Lovett	Mrs. White with the Poisonous Fish in the Kitchen	13 January 1993	Working title was Red Herrings. Episode 15 in production queue.
16	"False Profits"	Belinda Davey as Sister Ishtar	Rev. Green with the Divination Pond in the Dining Room	20 January 1993	Written by Graeme Farmer. Episode 16 in production queue.
17	"The Pay-Off"	Nadine Garner as Anita Lockhart	Prof. Plum with the Camera Cable in the Billiard Room	27 January 1993	Working title was 'The Pay-Off'. Episode 17 in production queue.
18	"Poison Pen"	David Argue as Bruno Fume	Col. Mustard with the Revolver in the Library	2 December 1993	Written by Karin Altman. Episode 18 in production queue.
19	"Sparks"	Angelo D'Angelo as Joe Martini	Mrs. White with the Poison in the Kitchen	9 December 1993	Episode 19 in production queue.
20	"Murder Most Foul"	John Gregg as Sebastian Smith	Mrs. White with the Poison Phial in the Kitchen	15 December 1993	Written by Michael Harvey, and script edited by Graeme Farmer. Directed by Oscar Whitbread and produced by David Taft. Working title in first draft was 'To Sleep, Perchance to Dream'. Episode 20 in production queue.
21	"A Brush With Death"	Lynda Stoner as Gloria Chase	Col. Mustard with the Scarf in the Billiard Room	23 December 1993	Written by Karin Altmann, and script edited by Graeme Farmer. Second draft completed on 7 July 1992. Produced by David Taft and directed by Oscar Whitbread. Working title was 'La Grande Bouffante'. Episode 21 in production queue.
22	"With A Smile On His Dial"	John O'May as Buzz Bradshaw III	Miss Scarlet with the Gold Brick in the Dining Room	30 December 1993	Written by Elizabeth Coleman, and script edited by Graeme Farmer. Produced by David Taft and directed by Oscar Whitbread. Episode 22 in production queue.
23	"Where There's A Will"	Sidney Jackson as Clarry Trotter	Col. Mustard with the Wheel Brace in the Lounge	28 December 1994	Written by Michael Harvey. Episode 23 in production queue.
24	"Hush Hush Sweet Scarlett"	David Franklin as Tom Branchflower	Prof. Plum with the Switch in the Study	23 January 1995	Written by Victoria Madden and Lewis Bellamy. Episode 24 in production queue.
25	"Death And Taxes"	Bruce Myles as Fergus Featherstone	Mrs. Peacock with the Knife in the Library	8 February 1995	Written by Vince Moran. Episode 25 in production queue.

== Critical reception ==
"Crawfords has been very clever in putting Cluedo together. The dramatised murder is as much a regular production...as any soap opera or series it has devised.

But really, if you were to look at Cluedo as a dramatic work, it's so woeful... But that is of necessity... You have to be able to present the worst drama possible, knowing only too well that you will get away with it."

— Mark Wallace in The Canberra Times about how Cluedo compares to other Crawford productions.

Prior to its airing on 4 June The Age's John Mangan wrote "the storylines are deceptively appealing and the cast has mastered a neat line in subtle overacting...one gripe though: deducing the murderer may be a worthy challenge", and on 7 June described the show as an "entertaining and engaging romp". From initial impressions, TV Weekly's Lawrie Masterson thought the programme was a "touch unsatisfying" as the audience winner is not asked about their deductive reasoning or time taken to reach their conclusion; he also felt it dragged compared to 30 minute versions of Cluedo. Raymond Gill of The Age suggested the show was "two parts high camp drama, one part studio audience guessing game, with just a smidgeon of game show patter, and noting the franchise element commented, "you have played the board game, now you can watch the TV show".

The Sydney Morning Herald suggested it had been "shamelessly" based on the British television format and added that the ability to feedback data on the most suspected suspects "adds a note of tension to the proceedings". The newspaper thought the show fell short of interactive television as "home viewers may feel left out by being unable to take part in the deduction"; while they noted the 0055 number was available for prizes, a missed opportunity was to bet on the outcome with Cluedo-TAB (TAB is an Australian betting software). The newspaper added, "it remains to be seen whether your average couch potato has the stamina to remain on the case for the duration", and suggested, "if Cluedo fails, it will not be a reflection on the quality of the show., but on the fickleness of an audience used to spoon-fed thrills".

On its debut on 10 June, The Age also questioned whether the show represented "an upward swing in game shows or a downward swing in drama", suggesting it "combines both elements but is compelling as neither"; the newspaper added that "as a game show it has too little at stake to be truly exciting...and as drama it looks and feels flat. On 10 June, The Herald-Sun suggested its failure as a drama is irrelevant as its "purely" designed as a money-making gameshow; the newspaper noted the "hammy...over-the-top music hall melodrama" acting and McFadyen's "uncomfortable...ambl[ing]" through the audience, though concluded that the show "relies not on production values or performances for success".

The Sunday Sun-Herald deemed it a "pleasant enough diversion" but suggested it was better suited to an ABC schedule due to the "overlit" studio audience and "awkward" seating giving it a "scruffy" daytime television feel. On 15 June, Who's Gerri Sutton wrote the series was "such ultra-lightweight fun" that it might take time getting used to, and "has all the signs of being viewer-friendly". On 17 June, The Sun-Herald felt incorporating the game show element was an "inherent problem" in Cluedo's mechanics, preventing the show from offering a "flowing, pacey hour of entertainment"; the newspaper adding the show's success would not be dependent on "the quality of the writing or the strength of its performances", rather on the "0055 component" giving home viewers a chance to win a trip. While questioning the show's quality, a reviewer welcomed a novel addition to the television schedule.

The Herald-Sun noted the acting difficulty of giving life to "corny, exaggerated, overdrawn caricatures", arguing only Mallaby "managed to inject anything approaching credibility"; the newspaper added that Westmore "almost got there" despite frequent "facial shock-horror" and Gallacher "did his best" to give conviction to a "dumb" character, though questioned Daddo's "mugging" performance. The newspaper wrote McFadyen "feign[s] interest in the whiz-bang computer predictions" while "looking...like he wished he was somewhere else". Mark Wallace of The Canberra Times frequently wrote pieces about the series, recommending it as "very clever" on 14 June, "low-rent fun" on 22 July, and "fun for the whole family" on 24 June. While negatively comparing the drama to Chances, he argued that as viewers are looking for efficiently placed clues, it is necessary to have "a plot that goes over the top on exposition [and] characters who over-act." Wallace voted the show 'Tonight's Pick' at least three times. Observing the gamification of life and pointing to re-election competitions in Parliament and guest humiliation in current affairs interviews as examples, The Age thought of Cluedo as the game show evolution of the copper drama genre. The newspaper wrote that "by now viewers have got over the idea that this was an unfair form of whodunnit", and argued it bore the same resemblance to the classic whodunnit as The Main Event game show had to a humanities course. Sunday Times felt Cluedo was "able to bring out the hidden sleuth in most people" and noted its "novelty appeal" overcame some "corny situations in the plots and acting".

On 22 June, The Sydney Morning Herald's Alison Stewart felt the show had a "faintly awful...down-home Aussie soap" quality; furthermore she criticised the show for focusing on "heavy-handed clues, meaningful one-liners and unlikely characters bursting in on one another" over crafting a realistic story. On 24 June, The Age questioned the whodunnit nature of Cluedo, writing the show's "one crucial flaw" was that "the more attention you pay to it, the further from the solution you are likely to stray", and suggesting "it is hard to see the show catching on". On 25 June, The Age criticised the "tiresome device" of every episode being set in the same home and the "hammy theatrics" of the ensemble cast who each week play the same six suspects. Furthermore the newspaper deemed it an "unexciting guessing game" with as much logic to it as a spin on Wheel of Fortune, due to its "absurd" solutions only being deducible through a "simple and intellectually mundane process of elimination". The Age agreed that the show was "pure guess work".

In his third consecutive review on 24 June, Figdeon reported receiving abuse from Daddo and McFadyen fans for writing negative comments about the show; he was accused of treating Paull "shabbily" despite having not mentioned her in the previous article, and of being "a bit rough" to Mallaby even though he said the actor was "about the best thing in it". Ohlsson felt he had "taken the show too seriously and noted his typos, while a 'friend' of a Cluedo writer suggested he "go back to the hole [he] crawled out of". Figdeon argued that the actors would be more likely to blame the press rather than the scripts. He noted that he hadn't had any correspondence from Nine Network "trumpteting the success" of the 0055 phone-in component of the show, which indicated it had not been a "runaway success". He promised not to do anymore "Cluedo-bashing", and advised he was open to liking the show if once they "get it right".

On 27 July, The Sydney Morning Herald agreed that the British version was "conducted with a great deal more dash", neatly accomplishing the format within 30 minutes. Noting that "in television, more of a good thing rarely produces better", the newspaper felt that "much of the fun and froth is lost" by extending the commercial game show, pointing to the "tedious, repeated plugs for the prizes" of Cluedo and The Main Event as prime examples. In a yearly round-up, a The Age journalist described the "inane" Cluedo as an example of the "truly woeful" new shows released by the commercial networks, contrasting it with Masterpiece, Cooking at the Academy, and La piovra. The Sunday Age described the play Shear Madness as "part Theatresports, with a bit of Cluedo thrown in".

Of the series 2 premiere "Busy Body" in January 1993, The Sydney Morning Herald wrote that while "homegrown television is a rare and wondrous beast, to be encouraged at all times", this particular production was "not up to snuff and not recommendable." The newspaper deemed the colour-coded suspects "mere ciphers...cardboard cutout figures which are very difficult to imbue with life without acting like the rankest of hams". Additionally the newspaper critiqued the "tepid" storyline", the "bored, sleepy or dull" studio audience, and "diffident" performances, deeming Paull the "only exception" due to "maintain[ing] her standards" and "enunciat[ing] clearly with a mouthful of grapes", and noted that "even when the murder room is made bleeding obvious 19 per cent fail to grasp the fact". However The Sydney Morning Herald wrote the following episode "Red Herring" was a "ripper of a show" due to guest Tina Bursill "revelling" in the role, the audience "lift[ing] its game", and Sumner giving a humorous reply when queried on Reverend Green's attitudes towards celibacy in the church.

=== Legacy ===
Technological advancements and mainstream references

Reviewers have commented on Cluedo's use of technology. While The Age described Cluedo as "innovative", Wallace deemed the show "probably a look at the future of the [murder mystery game show] genre". In The Canberra Times, he suggested that Cluedo's technology pre-empted a cable TV market where interactive home devices would circumvent the need for studio audiences by allowing viewers to become full participants in the murder investigation. Wallace hypothesised Cluedo parties in which participants could enjoy active investigation without the expense of "stage-your-own-murder parties". Furthermore, he pointed to the 0055 line as tech the series employed. The Sydney Morning Herald argued that this technique meant the audience are "as much the stars of the show" as the actors, as a "clever dick in row five can conceivably nail the suspect by asking the kind of fiendish question that always solves the case for Hercule Poirot".

Miss Scarlett actress Nicki Paull agreed that the ability to vote using computerised dials was considered new and advanced at the time. The Sydney Morning Herald noted the "novel" nature of studio audience being given handsets linked to a master computer. Arguably the first time an electronic device was used by a studio audience as instant feedback to an onscreen graphic, the "razor-edge television technology" was later employed in The Great Debate (1993) to allow voters to register their approval or disapproval by turning the knob. The Herald-Sun noted the "ingenuity" of viewers being able to phone in via a 0055 number to play along, writing that this ingredient made the show a "winner" despite its shortcomings. The detailed "Cluedo-like map" became a shorthand referred to by Campaign when discussing a complex building layout.

The show was sometimes referred to in politics, business, and crime; for example Craig Brown of the Sunday Times suggested that Margaret Thatcher would make an "admirable" Mrs Peacock on the series. In 1993 Mary Ann Sieghart of The Times thought a recent parliament leak scandal was as "intricate and entertaining" as Cluedo. In the midst of Enrique Bermúdez' assassination, The Sunday Times titled their coverage, 'Nicaragua gripped by grim game of Cluedo'. The Sun-Herald described the scattering of government numbers in the aftermath of the department indexing closures to the clues in a game of Cluedo. Computer Weekly thought solving how IBM would be broken-up was akin to a Cluedo mystery.

Northern Ireland ITN network executives dropped and replaced the second episode from series one ("Politician's Funeral") a day before airing on UTV (Ulster Television) because it mirrored the recent death of MP Ian Gow; Granada Television commented that showing the episode would have been "in bad taste" while according to Irish Examiner it was thought this coincidence would have caused the series to have a "rather inappropriate start". In discussing the Spectrum Task Force, The Age noted the seriousness of the police investigation, noting it was "not a game of Cluedo, to be trivialised by amateurs". Cluedo was evoked in a piece about the Birmingham Six, which suggested that even "novice" sleuths of the show could have "cracked this one".

Effects on cast and crew

The show had lasting effects for its cast and crew and was evaluated as part of their careers. In 1993, The Sydney Morning Herald sarcastically called Cluedo one of the "gems" of McFadyen's career, alongside the "unimaginatively dreadful" sitcom Bingles (1992) which had been "dumped" by Network Ten into the off-ratings season, and the following year The Age nicknamed him "Mr Cluedo". In 2011, The Courier Mail highlighted the series as part of McFadyen's "long and distinguished career". Meanwhile, Badler's experiences on the show, removed from the "special treatment" in her union-supported United States career, was a shock and made her "reevaluate why [she] was in the industry".

In 1995, series writer Ray Boseley confessed that the "television writing and earning money" was merely an "interesting diversion" from making his own passion projects. In 1998, The Age commented that Paull's presence at the Saab Le Meridien International Polo Tournament lent a "pleasant murder mystery feel to the day" while "mingling with the Toorak set and the landed gentry". That year, The Sydney Morning Herald suggested Nadine Gardner's guest appearance in the "truly woeful" show was a dark moment in her career alongside Prisoner, Neighbours, and All Together Now. Tony Cavanaugh, who had worked on the production team as writer and editor, retroactively described the show as "long-forgotten (and totally dreadful)".

The 2022 podcast So You Want To Make A TV Show was the first time the Daddo brothers worked together since their Cluedo episode 30 years prior. That year, Paull remembered the show as "a delight from beginning to end" and having been "very successful" in Australia, while Prisoner Officers and Inmates magazine deemed Mrs. White one of Westmore's most recognised roles after Prisoner. Rewatching Cluedo in 2022 from "many year's vantage point" after having "almost nil recollection" of the guest role and being reminded by Prisoner Officers and Inmates magazine, Lynda Stoner thought her episode "holds up...well".

Madeley saw the show's cancellation coincide with that of another show he fronted, daytime quiz Runway. For her role in the British series, Evening Standard thought Sugden's appearance would negatively affect her chances of being asked to return for a revival of Are You Being Served?. One of the panelists, journalist Clement Freud, subsequently wrote a full-page piece for The Times about his experience. In 1992, Callan admitted "people laugh when I tell them [I work for the show], but it pays the bills!". Grantham had starred in Cluedo as Colonel Mustard after having been charged for murder in the 80s, an irony brought up by The Sun's reporter at a press conference which angered the actor. Cluedo contestant Tony Slattery, who later turned down a successful show because he thought it was "crap” advised “I have no rules about what I would do but I would not do Cluedo again”. In 1993, Irish Examiner deemed Cluedo one of the "top draw programmes" by British Cluedo director John O'Regan, alongside Busman's Holiday while in 1995, The Corkman deemed Cluedo one of the "highly creditable programmes" of O'Regan's career, and in 2001 The Guardian suggested that shows like Cluedo, Sabotage and The Mole appealed to Leahy's "devious, darker edge".

Chris Tarrant advised in 1996, "the shows I make are for a laugh, they're not supposed to be deep and meaningful", referring to two recently axed shows. The Observer agreed that Cluedo, alongside Tarrant's special The Opposite Sex (1994), were "not only best but actually forgotten". Asked in later years about the worst show he'd ever done, Tarrant immediately explained that Cluedo was "absolute garbage...the dullest experience ever...a pile of crap" and that he "would get drunk and depressed about it every night in the hotel". Additionally, he confessed to hating the show due to it taking too long to make, explaining "it was the one TV show I really hated all the way through... I spent two-and-a-half hours in the studio getting more and more bored". In Chris Tarrant: the biography, Virginia Blackburn listed it as one of the "forgettable...middle-of-the-road" programmes of Tarrant's career.

Evaluation within the genre

Cluedo has been evaluated within the context of its genre. In 1993, The Canberra Times suggested it was possibly the only television series based on a board game rather than vice versa. (Note: Game shows based on board games which premiered earlier include Scrabble (1984), Pictionary (1989), Monopoly (1990), and Trivial Pursuit (1990), though this may be the first Australian production.) The Age noted that while board games are often marketed as spin-offs from their TV shows, noting that many Sale of the Century contestants were given a board game prize, "it rarely happens the other way round". The newspaper listed the television mystery alongside its contemporaries Murder She Wrote and Inspector Morse (1987). Llanelli Star described Dim Cliw as a Welsh version of Cluedo; presented by Emyr Wyn and airing on S4C, each programme started with a short drama written by pathologist Bernard Knight culminating in a murder, followed by five teams of two playing detective locate clues and question suspects to discover the cause of death and who was responsible The prize for the team that successfully solves the mystery, with the winner spending a weekend at the Sherlock Holmes Hotel.

The Age agreed that Whodunnit? pioneered the format and potentially made it familiar to Australian audiences prior to Cluedo's airing. Granada would later claim to have invented the murder mystery game show format with Cluedo, in which a murder is enacted and a panel of sleuths solve the crime by quizzing actor suspects who remain in character; however, Aberdeen Press and Journal would refute this claim by referring to the earlier programme. The Doctors Who's Who describes Whodunnit? as a celebrity quiz show "not unlike Cluedo", and Dalek I Loved You described the show as "an earlier version of Cluedo". CST Online thought Cluedo wasn't particularly original, "re-treading ground already covered" by Whodunnit?. The Listener deemed the British version a "harmless enough" translation of the board game and "shows some improvement" on Thames's "extremely similar" Whodunnit fifteen years prior, though felt even a good cast couldn't "bring to life drama predicated on" weapons like lampstands and characters like Colonel Mustard.

Cluedo was used as a short-hand for describing simplicities in the crime fiction genre (i.e. Mrs White with the Candlestick in the Kitchen). The Stage felt that the cosy mystery series The Mrs Bradley Mysteries' characters were "as shallow" as the suspects in Cluedo. Meanwhile, Leeds Student described Murder, She Wrote as "Cluedo for illiterates", while The Sydney Morning Herald observed an episode "devolv[ing] sharply" into "yet another Cluedo-style whodunnit, complete with an appearance by token oldie". Similarly, Daily Mirror felt Daziel and Pascoe was "yet another cop show, with a cast full of one-dimensional Cluedo suspects". TV Tonight's David Knox thought Sleuth 101 (2010) was an original format of the whodunnit game show genre that echoed forerunners like Whodunnit? and Cluedo, and The Age deemed Sleuth 101 a "contemporary" Cluedo Commenting it had been many years since the whodunnit made an appearance in a television game show, Knox pointed to the relatively recent Cluedo and noted "there have been others harking all the way back to the 1950s game show To Tell the Truth". The Stage compared the "shallow[ness]" of the characters in Supply & Demand (1997) to the suspects in Cluedo. Evening Herald (Dublin) referred to a former whodunnit series being "the most appalling rubbish but I was hooked", noting that Cluedo was shaping up to "be the show's succesor" [sic].

In 1991, police spoof Lazarus & Dingwall had an episode featuring spate of murders that appeared to be imitating Cluedo scenarios. The Guardian thought Cluedo lovers would enjoy the "wacky...cliche[d]" police detective comedy and that also Jack and Jeremy's Real Lives' debut used Cluedo as part of its source material. Sunday Times wrote that watching Casualty was like a "sick, video-nasty variation" on Cluedo in which the viewer predicts the fate to befall the victims. The Observer wrote that the "hammed up detective spoof" Virtual Murder was unsure whether it wanted to be Cluedo or Moonlighting.

Copycat Television: Globalisation, Program Formats and Cultural Identity likened the show to TV Globo's Você Decide (1992), You Decide describing them both as "a hybrid, an amalgamation of a gameshow with a fictional situation and story"; the game show would become Brazil's first format and birth 37 adaptations around the world. While The Guardian compared the mystery-solving element to The Mole (2000), Crikey compared the show's story arcs to those of "campy prison romp" Wentworth (2013), a remake of Prisoner. Meanwhile, of the British version, Den of Geek and The Guardian drew comparisons with British series Armchair Detectives (2017) and The Murder Game (2003) respectively.

In 2008, The Age wrote "back in the old days all it took to satisfy those wanting a bit of amateur sleuthing on the couch was a TV adaptation of Cluedo", comparing it to the blood and gore of modern shows like Murder and CSI. The Guardian also saw the show's similarity to the 2020 whodunnit À vous de trouver le coupable, described by producer Christophe Dechavanne as Cluedo 4.0, which saw the concept's return to France 3 after the French version of Cluedo 26 years prior. The show's title was adopted for the true crime cold case podcast Clunes Cluedo.

Reverend Green's potential removal

The show's depiction of Reverend Green and religious themes effected the franchise. It has been speculated that the British series one had originally been written for Mr. Green (the American businessman iteration of the character) and Professor Plum thereby excluding the Reverend; upon airing, Mr. Green became Plum and Plum had become Reverend Green, however the Reverend was not given any murders in the entire six episode series. For series two, "the producers changed the actors and gave the characters different personalities and life histories, which the writers had to work to", according to Rattan.

Belfast Telegraph noted, "the devious deeds of the dastardly Rev Green cast an unholy shadow over his saintly figure as he stalks around the Cluedo mansion". Announced on 16 December 1992, two years after the airing of the British version and just after the Australian version, Waddington Games considered dropping the country parson as a prime suspect and replacing him with a businessman, which they said was "more appropriate for the '90s" and bringing the game in line with the American version.

Phillip Howard of The Times wrote a column, arguing it is "one of those little changes that can be interpreted as significant social indicators". He wrote that clergymen had long experienced a "social demotion" as murder suspects in the works of Jane Austen and Anthony Trollope, which was "now recognised by Cluedo". However, from a contemporary perspective, a businessman was "thought to be more relevant and a likelier murder suspect" in British society.

The Daily Telegraph, as quoted in The Guardian, wrote that the decision was "a sign of the fading social role of the church". Sunday Times thought the decision "undermin[ed] the basic appeal of the game and the literary subgenre from which it draws its inspiration". Waddington Games eventually reversed their decision after protests from Cluedo fans. The stunt led to The Mason Williams consultancy picked up a PRWeek award.
