= Cluedo – Das Mörderspiel =

- Based on: Cluedo (Australian game show); Cluedo (British game show); Cluedo board game
- Starring: Christine Wodetzky : Baroness Elisabeth von Porz; Horst Frank : Colonel Friedrich Wilhelm von Gatow; Cay Helmich : stepdaughter Gloria Thorbach; Till Topf : restorer Dr. Peter Blohm; Inge Wolffberg : housekeeper Helene Weiß; Klaus Barner : Pastor Clemens Grün; Heinz Weiss : Chief Inspector Rolf Taller
- Composer: Martin Böttcher
- Country of origin: Germany
- Original language: German
- No. of episodes: 12 over one season

Production
- Running time: approx. 45-50 minutes

Original release
- Release: 28 January – 15 April 1993

Cluedo – Das Mörderspiel is an interactive crime show by the private broadcaster Sat.1 based on the detective board game Cluedo. The Australian version of the game show of the same name, which was shown on the Nine Network channel from 1992 to 1993, served as the template for the twelve German episodes.

In Germany, the show was moderated by Gundis Zámbó and initially broadcast on Thursdays at 8:15 p.m. However, due to low ratings, those responsible took the show out of the program after only seven episodes, in order to broadcast the remaining five episodes later in the summer on Saturday afternoons. The music of the show was composed by Martin Böttcher.

== Development ==
The German adaption, titled Cluedo – Das Mörderspiel [de], aired for a limited duration of one or two seasons in 1993. Created by Stefan Fuchs, the series was broadcast on the private network Sat.1. The narration was provided by Klaus Kindler, and Gundis Zambo hosted the show. The show's development coincided with Sat.1's efforts to establish its own identity and attract attention, leading to the exploration of innovative ideas and talent. The musical composition for the series was by Martin Böttcher. The show was set in a fictional version of Schloss Leonberg (Leonberg Castle), drawing inspiration from the actual Sünching Castle near Regensburg.

Each episode featured the classic Cluedo suspects and six potential crime scenes (drawing room, dining room, library, billiard room, study, and kitchen). While they remained consistent throughout the series, the weapons and motives varied between episodes. The format of the show, with episodes lasting 50 minutes, was innovative for German television at the time. Originally airing on Thursday evenings at 8:15 p.m., the show was temporarily removed from the schedule due to low ratings after seven episodes, with the remaining five episodes rescheduled for a summer broadcast on Saturday afternoons.

== Plot and gameplay ==
The gameplay of the German adaptation differed from the British version, following Australia's model. Instead of celebrity teams, the audience directly interviewed suspects and aimed to solve the case for a holiday reward. The program's structure included a short film depicting an uninvited guest's arrival at the castle and the crime motives of the six suspects. The studio audience exclusively participated in clarifying the case, questioning suspects present in the studio about the events and making assumptions.

Interspersed between interrogations, the scene shifted to Leonberg Castle, where Chief Inspector Taller (played by Heinz Weiss) progressively resolved the murder case through stages and flashbacks. At the end of each episode, the perpetrator confessed, addressing all unresolved questions about the murder. The winner, the first to correctly identify the combination of perpetrator, murder weapon, and crime scene from the audience, received a prize of a flight to the Dominican Republic, the Balearic Islands, or the Canary Islands.

The six suspects were Pfarrer Clemens Grün (Klaus Barner), Oberst Friedrich Wilhelm von Gatow (Horst Frank), Gloria Thorbach (Cay Helmich), Peter Blohm (Till Topf), Caronin Elisabeth von Porz (Christine Wodetzky), and Helene Weiss (Inge Wolffberg). Crime scenes in each episode included the salon, dining room, library, billiard room, study, and kitchen. Later in the scenario, following the occurrence of the murder, Inspector Hauptkommissar Rolf Taller (Hanz Weiss) appeared to investigate the crime, revealing further details.

== Episodes ==
1. Künstlerpech (28 Jan. 1993)
2. Schnüffler leben gefährlich (4 Feb. 1993)
3. Der letzte Kuss (11 Feb. 1993)
4. Tödliches Training (18 Feb. 1993)
5. First Lady (4 Mar. 1993)
6. Ein Engel kommt selten allein (11 Mar. 1993)
7. Eine heiße Story (1993)
8. Stimmen aus dem Jenseits (1993)
9. Satans Sänger (1993)
10. Blau ist dicker als Wasser (1993)
11. Machtwechsel in Schloß Leonberg (1993)
12. Der falsche Gast (1993)

== Critical reception ==
Hanz Weiss's portrayal was noted by Tagesspiegel as a character the audience could rely on. Quotenmeter characterized the show as one of the "innovative, unconventional, and sometimes kitschy" programs brought to Sat.1 by Stefan Fuchs during his tenure, with some becoming popular among the audience. In 2013, MGTV hosted the show on its platform and observed that while the cast included well-known actors, the format itself did not achieve significant success.
