= Tipple (disambiguation) =

Tipple can mean:

- Tipple, a structure used for loading coal, ore or minerals into railroad cars
- Tipple (insect), a common name for insects in the family Tipulidae, or Crane Flies
- Tiple, musical instruments related to the guitar and ukulele.
- Slang term for alcoholic beverage
- Bertrand M. Tipple (1868–1952), American Methodist writer and lecturer, founder and president of Methodist International College in Rome, Italy
- Chloe Tipple (born 1991), New Zealand sports shooter
- Dan Tipple (1890–1960), American Major League Baseball pitcher in 1915
