= Leonberg Castle =

Castle in Baden-Württemberg, Germany

Coordinates: 48°48′04″N 9°00′44″E

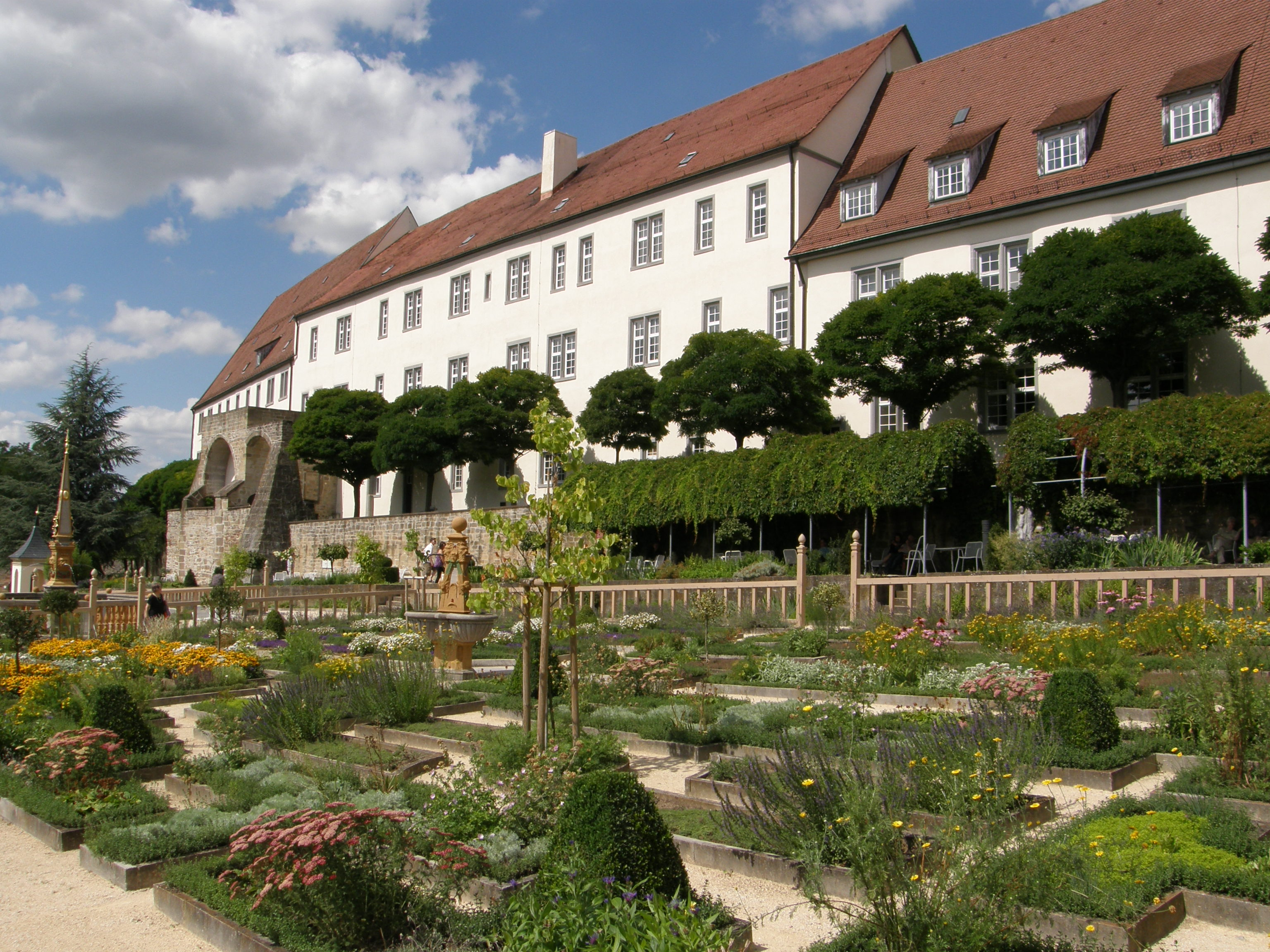
Castle and Pomeranzengarten

Schloss Leonberg was founded in 1248 by count Ulrich I of Württemberg.

The original castle was modified between 1560 and 1565 by the master builder Aberlin Tretsch by order of Duke Christoph of Württemberg.
