= Cluedo (French game show) =

- Based on: Cluedo British game show Cluedo board game
- Presented by: Christian Morin; Marie-Ange Nardi
- Country of origin: France
- Original language: French

Original release
- Release: 1994 – 1995

Cluedo is a game show broadcast on France 3, hosted by Christian Morin and by Marie-Ange Nardi, adapted from the British game show itself inspired by the board game Cluedo. It aired for two seasons in 1994–95. The cast consisted of Bernard Menez as Doctor Green (Docteur Olive), Andréa Ferréol as Mrs Peacock (Madame Pervenche), André Pousse as Colonel Mustard (Colonel Moutarde), Marie-Pierre Casey as Mrs White (Madame Leblanc), David Brécourt as Professor Plum (Professeur Violet), and Carole Fantony as Miss Scarlett (Mademoiselle Rose).

== Production ==
The French version was created by Jean-Jacques Pasquierm and produced by Emmanuelle Tanqurel and Patrice Aroun. Music was by Patrick Lemaitre, and production was Ellipse Programme and France 3. It ran for two seasons (1994–5) and four episodes on France 3. The series was hosted by Christian Morin (October 18, 1994 - November 8, 1994) and Marie-Ange Nardi (August 1, 1995 - August 29, 1995). Episodes are 1:20 hours long.

Toutelatele felt that it was decided to adapt a board game into a television show due to the channel "lacking inspiration or wanting to exploit a trend", likening it to Trivial Pursuit, Dessinez, c’est gagné inspired by Pictionary. In France, Cluedo is known as Mais qui a tué le Docteur Lenoir?, though the TV show was called Cluedo.

With just two episodes in each season, the titles were Dindes au Marron (Chestnut Turkeys), Le Dîner est Servi (Dinner is Served), La Chute d'une Petite Reine (The Little Queen's Fall), and La Tactique du Critique (Tactics of the Critic). The drama was shot-on-location at the Château de Vault-de-Lugny, while the live taping occurred on set with an audience.

== Plot and gameplay ==
Each show is divided into two parts. The first sees six actors perform short drama on each show during which a murder is committed; secondly, two pairs of contestants must then find out who is the culprit, with what weapon and in which room of the castle. The host welcomed the contestants and their team captains Macha Beranger Patrick Prejean, and Detective Morin introduced the suspects and possible weapons. Halfway through the drama, Morin intervenes to show a plan of the estate and the possible rooms. After viewing the entire pre-recorded footage, contestants must interview the Cluedo suspects, thus finding clues to advance the investigation and make accusations. Beforehand, lots are drawn to eliminate some options. The studio audience participates by putting their suggestions into computer devices. After the candidates make a final accusation for a combination of murderer-weapon-room, the victim appears as a ghost to reveal the murderer, who confesses their crime and motives.

== Release and aftermath ==
Home viewers could also participate via Minitel or phone to win prizes. Clues were hidden in the magazine Télé-Loisirs and game grids were detachable from the pages. Victims included popular TV stars Marie-Ange Nardi, Gérard Rinaldi, Thierry Beccaro and Karen Cheryl. After the broadcast of the first two episodes, the management at France 3, not being satisfied, asked for a new version of the game; host Christian Morin was replaced by Marie-Ange Nardi, and detective Yves Millon by Claude Rish. The new version of the show was broadcast over two Tuesdays in the evening (8:45 p.m) in the summer of 1995. In the second version, the candidates played alone and had particular profiles (police commissioner, amateur investigator etc.). With the new changes not being successful, after four episodes the show was cancelled. The Guardian also saw the show's similarity to the 2020 whodunnit À vous de trouver le coupable, described by producer Christophe Dechavanne as Cluedo 4.0, which saw the concept's return to France 3 after the French version of Cluedo 26 years prior. The series was republished in 2021 on YouTube by a user.

== Cast ==
There were six actors who participated in this show taking over the role of the characters of the game:

- Bernard Menez (Doctor Olive, doctor who wishes to retrain in politics)
- André Pousse (Colonel Moutarde, career soldier who comes to have happy days)
- Marie-Pierre Casey (Madame Leblanc, servant and cook)
- Andréa Ferréol (Madame Pervenche, manager of the hotel)
- David Brécourt (Professor Violet, researcher and historian)
- Carole Fantony (Mademoiselle Rose, receptionist)

The four victims were interpreted by stars of the small screen:

- Marie-Ange Nardi ("The turkey with chestnuts", October 18, 1994)
- Gérard Rinaldi ("Dinner is served", November 8, 1994)
- Karen Cheryl ("The Fall of a Little Queen", August 1, 1995)
- Thierry Beccaro ("The critic's tactics", August 29, 1995)

== Episodes ==
- October 18, 1994 - Dindes au Marron, written by Stéphane Guenin and Bernard-Pierre Molin
- November 8, 1994 - Le Dîner est Servi
- August 1, 1995 - La Chute d'une Petite Reine
- August 29, 1995 - La Tactique du Critique
