= Il delitto è servito =

Italian television program

- Based on: British Cluedo game show Cluedo board game
- Written by: Fabio Carlini, Alberto Consarino
- Directed by: Paolo Zenatello
- Creative director: Eugenio Falascone
- Presented by: Maurizio Micheli
- Music by: Franz Di Cioccio, Patrick Djivas
- Country of origin: Italy
- Original language: Italian

Production
- Cinematography: Adriano Bernacchi

Original release
- Network: Canale 5
- Release: 1992 – 1993

Il delitto è servito (Literally The crime is served) is an Italian television program of the detective game show genre, and an Italian adaptation of the British game show Cluedo, and an elaboration of the British board game of the same name that transforms participants into detectives. It was broadcast in the late evening on Canale 5 over 15 episodes from December 1992 to January 1993, and May 1993 to July 1993. The series was hosted by Maurizio Micheli. It was produced by La Italiana Produzioni.

The broadcast was a detective game show inspired by the Cluedo board game, which aired on Friday in the late evening and later on Saturdays. The aim of the game was to discover for each episode the culprit of a crime among six suspects, through questions and clips from a short drama played by them, until the revelation of the murderer. In each episode, four competitors in the studio and one telephone from home faced each other in solving the mysterious case.

== Production ==
The Italian version of Cluedo was called Il delitto è servito (The crime is served) and ran from 1992 to 1993 on Canale 5. It was hosted by Maurizio Micheli, who also conceived of the Italian adaptation. directed by Paolo Zenatello, produced by Nanni Mandelli, cinematographer Andriano Bernacchi. The show was Micheli's debut as a presenter. Each episode saw a crime committed at the six-room Villa dei Castagni. It was by Italiana Produzioni and Mediaset networks. Prior to directing the show, Zenatello had director other television game shows for Fininvest including Caccia al tesoro (Treasure Hunt). Maurizio Micheli commented, "strange to say, it's a smart quiz."

The show was first broadcast on Friday evenings, and later on Saturdays. It was cancelled in February 1993 due to poor ratings.

== Plot and gameplay ==
The program is led by Maurizio Micheli, who has the task of investigating the intricate murders. In each episode there are two pairs of detectives made up of actors, writers, mystery writers or experts in the sector. The murder always takes place in the same villa, there are six possible weapons used for the crime, and always the same six potential killers - a fixed cast of three actors and three actresses. The game is won by the couple who manages to solve the case by answering the three key questions - who? where? with what?. Viewers can also play by questioning the suspects on the phone.

There were four competitors in the studio and one by telephone from home. Each episode lasted half an hour.

The six suspects are:

- Aldo Ralli as Don Verdone (Reverend Green)
- Serena Cantalupi as Contessa Maria Azzurra Biolchi Padini (Mrs. Peacock)
- Grazia Minarelli as Rossella Biolchi Padini (Miss Scarlet)
- Maurizio Trombini as Dott. Piergiorgio Bruni (Professor Plum)
- Giuliana Rivera as Bianca Pelloni (Mrs White)
- Gabriele Villa as Comm. Arturo Biondi (Colonel Mustard)

== Episodes (incomplete) ==
No. in series	Title	Synopsis	Solution	Panelists	Original release date	Production notes
1	TBA	Countess Maria Azzurra's intends to marry Baronet Reginald as her third husband. This marriage would endanger the established positions of all the countess's friends. It is revealed that Reginald isn't who he claims to be, and he is soon murdered.	TBA	TBA	December 3, 1992	Series debut. Adapted from the British episode Countdown (S1E1).
2	TBA	Two expert bridge players, Elena Mazzacurati (played by actress Margareta von Kraus) and ? (played by actor Antonio Ballerio) beat the locals and win money that can't be paid.	TBA	Mario Marenco [it] (actor), Sonia Gray (actress and TV presenter), Andrea Pinketts (writer and former sheriff), Wanda Mastroianni (La Volpe detective)	December 10, 1992	Directed by Paolo Zenatello. Adapted from the British episode A Bridge Too Far (S1E3).
3	TBA	Nini Salerno (of the vocal group Gatti di Vicolo Miracoli) plays the victim.	TBA	TBA	December 17, 1992	TBA
4	TBA	TBA	TBA	Fabrizia Carminati [it] (presenter), Carlo Oliva [it] (writer), Gianfranco Ambrosini [it] (journalist), Maria Teresa Angus (previous week's phone-in winner)	January 7, 1993	TBA
5	TBA	TBA	TBA	TBA	January 14, 1993	A snippet exists for this episode.
6	TBA	A window cleaner is murdered.	TBA	TBA	January 21, 1993	Adapted from British episode Charity Begins At Home (S2E4)
7	"Affari di Cuore "	The victim is Hud (played by Giorgio Melazzi [it]) - a heavy metal singer and devil worshipper. After having publicly declared that he is in love with the beautiful and rich Rossella Biolchi Padini and that he wants to marry her, he is found murdered.	Dott. Bruni in the Library with the Telephone	Mirko Maggi (journalist), Pietro Marengo (cartoonist), Marilena Salvarezza (teacher), Giuliana Nardi (fifth week's phone-in winner).	January 30, 1993	Directed by Paolo Pietrangeli Adapted from the Australian episode The Axeman Cometh (S1E9).
8	TBA	Unscrupulous businessman Simone Borsieri (Cesare Ferrario [it]) advises Don Verdone to invest a large sum of money in the stock exchange. The deal in addition to not going through turns out to be a scam. Countess Maria Azzurra is also the victim of a similar operation that sees her forced to mortgage Villa dei Castagni but, before all this happens, Borsieri is found dead.	TBA	Giandomenico Anastasia, Alessandra Anselmi, Gianni Pistorio (lawyer), Franco Franchi (TV writer), (previous week's phone-in winner).	May 28, 1993	Directed by Paolo Zenatello. Adapted from British episode A Deadly Deal (S2E1).
9	TBA	TBA	TBA	TBA	June 4, 1993	TBA
10	"Un'assicurazione mortale. (A mortal insurance.)"	The countess Maria Azzurra Biolchi Padini decides to secure her magnificent villa and asks for help from her friend Piergiorgio Bruni, who tracks down Deborah, her former university friend, now an established insurance manager. When she arrives at Villa dei Castagni, Deborah immediately notices some things that make her suspicious but she doesn't have the time to verify her doubts because she is murdered.	TBA	Mario Gerosa [it] (architect and author), Amedeo Manzato (investigative detective), Marinella Canesi (journalist), Monica Autumn (journalist)	June 11, 1993	Written by Antonio Ricci, with Emma Coriandoli and Sergio Vastano, and directed by Paolo Zenatello. A snippet exists for this episode. Adapted from British episode The Best Insurance (S2E2).
11	TBA	TBA	TBA	TBA	June 18, 1993	TBA
12	TBA	TBA	TBA	TBA	June 25, 1993	TBA
13	"'l'abito non fa il monaco'. (The dress does not make the monk)."	The episode's victim is Sister Chiara (Lidia Costanzo [it]) sister of the ex-husband of Lacontessa Biolchi Padini, who after spending years in Brazil as a missionary returns to Italy after the death of her brother, with a claim on the Villa dei Castagni. To prove her claim, Sister Chiara decides to show her sister-in-law a letter that designates her heir to the property but, before that happens, she is killed.	TBA	Cinzia Berni it] (stage actress), Fiorenzo Barzaghi it] (journalist), Claudia Shammah (criminal lawyer), Claudio Nizzi (author)	July 2, 1993	Series finale. Directed by Paolo Zenatello. Adapted from British episode And Then There Were Nuns (S3E4).

== Critical reception ==
Micheli said the show was "well packaged by prominent authors and with important actors" but added "it was canceled because it did not have many viewers...only people with good taste liked it." Italian newspaper la Repubblica wrote that "the whole program is quite pleasant." Meanwhile, Teatroemusicanews wrote Il delitto è servito was a "beautiful program". Orgoglionerd thought it is program where "deduction, intelligence and attention to detail were the masters". Radiocorriere thought the show offered a "very complicated story". La Stampa deemed it "an agile and fast program that you can watch without dying of boredom"; furthermore it noted the show was "simply a good product with an extra idea, which is now very rare", and concluding it as a "refreshing little program, a nice little surprise".
