= Cluedo (franchise) =

Media franchise based on the board game of the same name

Cluedo, known as Clue in North America, is a murder mystery-themed multimedia franchise started in 1949 with the manufacture of the Cluedo board game. The franchise has since expanded to film, television game shows, book series, computer games, board game spinoffs, a comic, a play, a musical, jigsaws, card games, and other media.

== Background ==
It began with the original Cluedo board game where the host Mr. Boddy (Dr. Black in the UK version) was found dead where he was killed by one of the visitors in a certain room with a certain murder weapon.

=== Characters ===
The murder victim in the game was known as Dr. Black in the UK edition and Mr. Boddy in North American versions. Updated editions of the game, released by Hasbro in 2023, refer to him as Boden "Boddy" Black Jr.

Player tokens are typically plastic pawns or figurines; the standard edition of the game has six suspects:

- Miss Scarlett (the second "t" was dropped in North American versions after 1963 and added back in 2016), the stock femme fatale character; she is represented by a red token/figurine.
- Colonel Mustard, a retired military officer with a distinguished career; he is represented by a yellow token/figurine.
- Mrs. White, the chief domestic servant, typically the housekeeper or cook, updated as "Chef White" in the 2023 edition; she is represented by a white token/figurine.
  - In the 2016 edition Mrs. White was replaced by Dr. Orchid, a young biologist and adopted daughter of the victim, represented by a pink token. Dr. Orchid was replaced by Chef White in the 2023 UK and North American editions.
- Reverend Green, the local clergyman, updated as Mayor Green in the 2023 edition; he is represented by a green token/figurine.
  - Known as Mr. Green in North American editions, initially a middle-aged businessman with possible criminal connections turned into a young and handsome playboy.
- Mrs. Peacock, a stylish widowed socialite, updated as "Solicitor Peacock" in the 2023 edition; she is represented by a blue token/figurine.
- Professor Plum, an intelligent yet absent-minded academic; he is represented by a purple token/figurine.

=== Rooms ===
The rooms on the board game consist of the hall, the lounge, the dining room, the kitchen, the ballroom, the conservatory, the billiard room, the library, and the study.

=== Murder weapon ===
The weapon icons are typically made of unfinished pewter (except the rope, which may be plastic or string); special editions have included gold-plated, brass-finished, and sterling silver versions. Early versions of the game included lead piping that was made from actual lead, and which was replaced with a steel version in later editions.

- Candlestick
- Dagger (Knife in North American editions)
- Lead piping (Lead pipe in North American editions)
- Revolver (first depicted in the UK as a Dreyse M1907 semi-automatic pistol, and in North America as a Colt M1911 pistol)
- Rope
- Spanner (Wrench in North American editions)

== Board game spin-offs ==
Waddingtons, Parker Brothers, and Hasbro have created many spin-off versions of the game, consisting of alternative rules varying from the original Classic Detective Game. (Such spin-offs are distinct from themed "variants" using the basic rules and game configuration, effectively new skins on the original board game.) In addition to revising the rules of gameplay, many of the spin-off games also introduce new characters, locations, weapons, and/or alternative objectives.

=== Clue VCR Mystery Game ===
The Clue VCR Mystery Game (1985) released as Cluedo: The Great Video Detective Game in the UK and Australia. Rather than the standard table-top board, this VCR adaptation relied on an hour-long video containing humorous scenes of the suspects interacting at Boddy Mansion. Players watched the recording, in either VHS or Beta tape formats, to uncover details of several murders per game, matching clues given on cards to the action on the video. Only five weapons (candlestick, knife, revolver, rope, and poison) and five rooms (Dining Room, Kitchen, Hall, Conservatory, and Library) are featured but there are a total of ten suspects, with Monsieur Brunette, Madam Rose, Sgt. Gray, and Miss Peach in addition to the original six. It is notable for being the first game adaptation to rely on a videotape recording. Released in April 1985, it sold nearly 500,000 copies, becoming the fourth best-selling video cassette of 1985 in the US (after Beverly Hills Cop, Star Trek III: The Search for Spock and Ghostbusters). Consisting of "18 different lively mysteries", Games named it among the top hundred games of the year.

=== Super Cluedo Challenge ===
Super Cluedo Challenge (1986) is an advanced version of the Cluedo rules, introducing three new characters (Captain Brown, Miss Peach and Mr. Slate-Grey) and three more weapons (the blunderbuss, poison and axe). The rules are greatly expanded, with each card having coloured and numbered squares in each corner, which are uncovered by special card holders. These allowed 'clues' to be given by uncovering a small segment of the card, showing only a colour/number. Rather than the remaining cards being dealt out at the start of the game, they had to be 'discovered' by reaching one of the many blue counters scattered on the board.

=== Clue VCR II: Murder in Disguise ===
Clue VCR II: Murder in Disguise (1987) Sequel to Clue VCR Mystery Game; more scenarios with the same 10 characters from the first VCR game. The rooms this time around are the Dining Room, Lounge, Hall, Billiard Room, and Hotel Room.

=== Cluedo Master Detective ===
Cluedo Master Detective (1988, released as Clue: Master Detective in North America and Super Cluedo in France, Germany and UK) is an expanded version of the original game. In addition to the original characters, weapons and rooms, the game adds four new characters (Madam Rose, Sgt. Gray, M. Brunette and Miss Peach—the same four characters introduced in the VCR games), two new weapons (poison and horseshoe), and seven new rooms (courtyard, gazebo, drawing room, carriage house, trophy room, studio, and fountain) to the mansion. This version was also made into a video game.

=== Clue Jr. Case of the Missing Pet ===
Clue Jr.: Case of the Missing Pet (1989) was a variant for children and the first Clue Jr. game in the United States of America. The player played as one of the old six suspects, who are children, and try to find out who took the missing pet and where they hid it. The suspects' names are Mortimer Mustard, Georgie Green, Peter Plum, Wendy White, Polly Peacock and Samantha Scarlet.

=== Travel Clue ===
Travel Clue (1990) is more than just a miniaturised version of the standard game as offered for the UK Cluedo editions, the first US travel edition is played somewhat differently. Instead of rolling dice, players simply choose a room to visit on their turn. Once there, they can see any cards in the room and question other players.

=== Cluedo: The Great Museum Caper ===
Cluedo: The Great Museum Caper (1991), released as Clue: The Great Museum Caper in North America, is rather different from the original. One player is a thief whose goal is to steal paintings while the other players attempt to apprehend the thief. The thief keeps track of his or her position secretly on paper and is thus not seen by the detectives, until the thief is spotted by a detective or the museum's security system. Ideally, multiple rounds are played, with each player getting to be the thief once. The winner of the match is then the thief who stole the most paintings without getting caught.

=== Cluedo Card Game ===
Cluedo Card Game (1992) is a shedding-type card game, where players attempt to match cards featuring the locations, weapons, and characters from the original game with a central pile of cards.

=== Clue Little Detective ===
Clue Little Detective (1992) is commonly considered a major departure from the standard game, as the object of this game is to be the first to reach the front gate from the attic after hearing a scary noise. It is not an official Clue Jr game.

=== Junior Cluedo ===
Junior Cluedo (1993) is the first Junior game for Cluedo, second Clue Jr. game overall. Instead of finding the murderer, the players need to find the ghost of their ancestors and remember where they are.

=== Travel Clue Jr. ===
Travel Clue Jr. (1994) Like the regular Travel Clue game, it is not merely a miniaturised version of the Clue Jr. series, but a unique format with its own set of rules. Instead of rolling dice, a spinner is used, to move around the board for an opportunity to open a door and obtain a clue.

=== Clue Super Sleuth ===
Cluedo Super Sleuth (1995) is another advanced version of the Cluedo rules, though in a different manner. There is no set board to this game, instead the board is made up of twelve tiles which are laid out randomly as players enter new rooms, to create a 4x3 grid. The murder cards remain unchanged to the basic edition, but are not dealt to each player, instead there are 'clue' squares on the board marked by small plastic magnifying glasses, which players collect to get clues. In addition to the "clue" counters there are also item counters, which allow the player to pick a card from an item deck. These item cards allow such things as making more than one suggestion per turn, or moving an extra character. Extra characters in the game include a Black Dog, Inspector Grey, and Hogarth the Butler. They can serve as help or hindrance and are controlled through the item and event cards. Event cards are drawn from a deck upon a certain roll of the die and can have varying impact on a game.

=== Clue Jr. The Case of the Hidden Toys ===
Clue Jr.: The Case of the Hidden Toys (1995, later reproduced in 1998) is themed for children. Instead of solving a murder, the children search for clues for the whereabouts of some lost toys. The rules are significantly different from those for the regular board game. The characters have been reduced to 4. Version One's detectives are named Mortimer Mustard, Samantha Scarlet, Peter Plum, and Greta Green, while version two's detectives were named Vivienne Scarlet, Liz Peacock, Peter Plum, and Johnny Green.

=== Cluedo: Passport to Murder ===
Cluedo: Passport to Murder (2000) was an update of Super Cluedo Challenge with the setting changed to an Orient Express-style train in Istanbul station. There is very little change to the mechanics of the game (except each player can only play the six original characters), with mainly cosmetic changes and updates to the characters.

=== Cluedo Card Game ===
Cluedo Card Game (2002) is a different card game from the previous game, this time the user has to deduct the Dr. Black's killer, their escape vehicle and their destination.

=== Cluedo SFX ===
Cluedo SFX (2003) released as Clue FX in the US, (2004), and Super Cluedo Interactif in France, (2004) is another departure from the original rules. Each player plays as one of four new characters (Lord Grey, Lady Lavender, Miss Peach and Prince Azure), adding the first non-Caucasian character since the early Asian Miss Scarlet, none of whom are suspected in the crime. The murder is not of Dr. Black (Mr. Boddy) but of his attorney Miles Meadow-Brook. The usual suspects are in place, this time bolstered by two new people Mrs. Meadow-Brook and Rusty the Gardener. The gameplay is completely different though, with the introduction of the electronic section announcing moves and clues and no die rolling. Instead players move from location to location to track down each of the suspects to gain their clues, before finding Inspector Brown to make an accusation.

=== Cluedo Junior: The Case of the Missing Cake ===
Cluedo Junior: The Case of the Missing Cake (2003) released under the Clue brand in North America, is another children's variation where the players have to find out who ate a piece of chocolate cake, when did they eat it, and with what drink.

=== Cluedo Mysteries ===
Cluedo Mysteries (2005), released in the US as Clue Mysteries (2006) This is another change of rules, and this time the gameplay is based heavily on another board game called "Mysteries of Old Peking".

=== Cluedo DVD Game ===
Cluedo DVD Game (2005) released under the Clue brand in North America. This edition of the game has different rules based on DVD interaction. Instead of a murder, Dr. Black has had an item stolen and, in addition to guessing the criminal, location (room) and stolen object, the time of day when the crime took place also has to be discovered. In each turn players guess three of these four unknowns; and from time to time Inspector Brown and the butler, Ashe, show up via the DVD with helpful information.

=== Cluedo Party ===
Cluedo Party (2007) is the first murder-mystery party game, similar to the How to Host a Murder franchise, but based around the classic six suspects. The kit includes props and invitations for up to 8 guests, and two different mysteries to solve.

=== Clue Express ===
Clue Express (2008) is part of the Hasbro Express game series, players roll dice in this travel-sized edition to determine what actions they must take in deducing who was the brains, the brawn, and optionally the driver who planned and executed the crime. In 2021, Hasbro re-released the game as Clue DICED!, with the same elements and gameplay but with square packaging (as compared to the round packaging used for Express) and, like the latest versions of the board game, updated with Dr. Orchid replacing Mrs. White.

=== Cluedo: Discover the Secrets ===
Cluedo: Discover the Secrets (2008) was released under the Clue brand in North America. This game was created in an effort to update what Hasbro considered to be an old-fashioned game; however, the traditional version of the game remained on sale as well. The game features new, up-to-date weapons, rooms, and suspects as well as changes to the rules of gameplay (see below).

=== Cluedo: Carnival - The Case of the Missing Prizes ===
Cluedo: Carnival – The Case of the Missing Prizes (2009) released under the Clue brand in North America. Set in a carnival atmosphere, another children's edition, introducing new rules with playing cards, and two levels of play.

=== Clue: Secrets In Paris ===
Clue: Secrets In Paris (2009) is a variant of the game features the same weapons (and rules) as Discover the Secrets (see above). The location has been changed to Paris, and the suspects are now youthful teenage versions of their adult counterparts, on a class field trip, who must discover which of their classmates has stolen a piece of art from the Louvre.

=== Clue: Secrets & Spies ===
Clue: Secrets & Spies (2009) is unrelated to the similarly titled hidden-object game by Pogo. The classic Clue characters are recast as spies who travel the world to thwart Agent Black. Each player secretly assumes the rule of one of the six spies. They then take turns commanding one of the spies, including Agent Black, to travel between the major cities on the game board in order score points by completing secret meetings and collecting items needed to complete missions. The introduction of a points system is another major distinction from other Cluedo/Clue games. Points are scored for the spies that completed a mission or meeting as well as the player's secret spy identity, which are added to the spy's total at the end of the game. The game also featured an optional text messaging service that gave the current player various directives randomly during the game, which has been discontinued by the publisher.

=== Clue: The Card Game: Mystery at Sea ===
Clue: The Card Game: Mystery at Sea (2009) similar to the prior card game, in this version Mr. Boddy and his guests are on Mr. Boddy's yacht when one of them is murdered. The weapons and rooms are different. Also, in the beginning, one of the seven suspect cards (the original six and Mr. Boddy) is drawn randomly, and this person is the victim for that game. This is one of the ideas which was carried over from the original concept of the game.

=== Clue Suspect ===
Clue Suspect (2010) is not to be confused with Clue Suspects (a solo player deduction puzzle sold by Winning Moves), this card game relies on players asking questions between turns to determine the facts of the crime.

=== Clue Elimination ===
Clue Elimination is a variation of Clue that uses four Nerf Jolt EX-1 blasters.

=== Cluedo: The Classic Mystery Game ===
Cluedo: The Classic Mystery Game (2012) released under the Clue brand in North America. The first standard English language Cluedo game to feature a bedroom and bathroom (as well as an upstairs), it marks a return to the classic formula of 6 traditional weapons, and classic locations, albeit with a younger cast of characters. However, most notably absent are the clock cards introduced with Discover the Secrets in 2008, which could result in the eventual elimination of a player during the game. Players now start in the center of the board, rather than dedicated starting spaces, similar to Cluedo Master Detective. The rooms have slightly different names and are arranged differently around the game board. The victim and owner of the mansion is named Samuel Black in this version. This edition also has a different back story of why the guests came to the mansion. The game also features 2 player rules, which is also a first in the standard edition US game.

=== Clue: The Classic Mystery Game ===
Clue: The Classic Mystery Game (2013) This version is very similar to the 2012 edition, and features a two-sided, quarter-folded game board with a "second crime scene" on the reverse side. The main mansion game features a similar board with a few minor changes from the previous version. There is no longer an upstairs to the mansion; rather the rooms that were upstairs in the previous version are now located on the main floor. The "Bonus Cards" have been eliminated completely from the main game, and the spaces in the hallway are now laid "stretcher bond" style, allowing players to more quickly move throughout the mansion. The player tokens have also returned to their standard "pawn" look from classic versions. The reverse's side's "second crime scene" is an outdoor boardwalk, with "rooms" that include an Arcade, a Jet Ski Rental, and a Beach. This second side features the return of the "Bonus cards" from the previous version, although there are now only three of them.

=== Cluedo: The Classic Mystery Game ===
Cluedo: The Classic Mystery Game (2016) is released under the Clue brand in North America. Hasbro notably introduced a new suspect: Dr. Orchid, a PhD botanist of East Asian heritage, replacing Mrs. White. This edition also includes a set of "Bonus cards" (29 in Cluedo, and 9 in Clue editions) that are played when a magnifying glass is rolled on the dice. Cluedo editions of the game include player tokens resembling the characters, while the Clue editions continue to use the standard "pawn" look from classic versions.

=== Cluedo Junior: The Case of the Missing Cake ===
Cluedo Junior: The Case of the Missing Cake (2016), released under the Clue brand in North America, s an update of the 2003 edition, for ages 5 and up, where players have to find out who ate a piece of cake, with what drink, and at what time. Notably, Mrs. White is replaced by Dr. Orchid in this update.

=== Parker Brothers Mystery Game ===
Parker Brothers Mystery Game (2017) is Hasbro's revived Parker Brothers brand with a release of this new Clue variant. Marketed as the "ultimate 'Mystery Game'", the eponymously titled game includes six new suspects: Madame Rubie, General Umber, Miss Azul, Mr. Pine, Sir Ube, and Dr. Rose; all of which generally line up with their traditional counterparts in terms of color, depiction, and names. Using 9 familiar rooms matching the traditional Cluedo mansion layout, and 6 similar weapons, the gameplay is a simplified version of the standard Cluedo rules, in a miniature format. The game board measures 10.5 inches square, and eliminates the secret passages, with a strict movement path navigated with one die. In this version, only 4 players play as "detectives" with the six suspects being totally separate tokens brought into the room instead of other players when suggestions are made.

=== Clue: What Happened Last Night? Lost In Vegas ===
Clue: What Happened Last Night? Lost In Vegas (2018) is The Hangover-esque version in which the goal is to determine where in Las Vegas your missing friend Buddy is, whom he was with, and what he was doing before your return flight home.

== Computer and video games ==
Various versions of the game were developed for Commodore 64, MSX, Atari ST, PC, Game Boy Advance, ZX Spectrum, Nintendo DS, Nintendo Switch, Super Nintendo Entertainment System, CD-i, Sega Mega Drive/Genesis, PC, Mac, Xbox 360 and Apple iPhone / iPod Touch.

- Clue: Parker Brothers' Classic Detective Game was released in 1992 for the Super Nintendo Entertainment System and Sega Genesis video game consoles.
- Cluedo (CD-i video game) was released for the CD-i.
- Clue: Murder at Boddy Mansion was released in 1998 for Microsoft Windows.
- In 1999, Clue Chronicles: Fatal Illusion was released, which was not based directly upon the board game, but instead uses the familiar characters in a new mystery.
- An arcade version of the game was released on an itbox terminal which involves answering questions with a chance to win money. It is available in many pubs throughout the UK.
- Clue Classic was released on June 3, 2008 developed by Games Cafe for Hasbro. It is a single player interactive game based on the latest 2002/2003 Classic Detective Game artwork featuring the original six characters, weapons and nine original rooms.
- In May 2009 Electronic Arts released a version of Clue for the Apple iPhone and iPod Touch on the Apple iTunes Music Store, entitled CLUE: Unravel the Clues and Crack the Case. This version was an entirely new game, based on the most recent spin-off game of Clue: Discover the Secrets. Additionally, EA's games site Pogo has a hidden-object game called "Cluedo: Secrets and Spies" (or "Clue" depending on market), where each game is a 60-minute "episode" (the object being to complete the game overall within this time limit). "Episodes" are usually grouped into "series" of two or more.
- On the iWin website, there is a Hidden Object Game called "Clue: Accusations & Alibis." It is also based on Clue: Discover the Secrets.
- Clue: The Classic Mystery Game was released on iOS and Android in December 2016. Developed and published by Marmalade Game Studio, it is a faithful adaptation of the board game on mobile devices.
- Clue: The Classic Mystery Game was released for the Nintendo Switch on November 30, 2018 in Europe. and in North America on December 17, 2018.
- Escape room puzzle game Adventure Escape Mysteries by Haiku Games included a limited time game based the 2023 edition of Cluedo, in which you must solve puzzles to find clues and deduce the murder at the end.

== Film and television ==
=== 1985 film ===
A comedic film Clue, based on the American version of the game, was released in 1985 and starring Eileen Brennan, Tim Curry, Madeline Kahn, Christopher Lloyd, Michael McKean, Martin Mull, and Lesley Ann Warren. In this version, the person murdered was Mr. Boddy. The film featured 3 different endings released to different theatres. It received mixed reviews and did poorly at the box office, ultimately grossing $14,643,997 in the United States, though it later developed a cult following. All three endings released to theatres are available on the VHS and DVD versions of the film, to watch one after the other (VHS), or to select playing one or all three endings (DVD/Blu-ray).

=== Upcoming film ===
Universal Pictures touted a 2008 deal with Hasbro that licensed several of its board games for feature film adaptations; Gore Verbinski was announced as director of Clue, before Universal dropped the project in 2011.

Hasbro landed a new Clue film deal at 20th Century Fox in 2016, with Josh Feldman, Ryan Jones, and Daria Cercek producing. Their film was planned as a "worldwide mystery" with action-adventure elements, potentially setting up a possible franchise that could play well internationally. Fox announced in January 2018 that Ryan Reynolds, as part of his first-look deal with the studio, would star in a live-action remake of Clue, with Rhett Reese and Paul Wernick as scriptwriters. Jason Bateman was connected to the project in 2019, then left, with James Bobin discussed as his replacement in 2020. Following Disney's acquisition of 20th Century Fox, Reynolds expressed uncertainty about the film in 2021, bringing Oren Uziel onboard to rewrite the screenplay in 2022.

Sony Pictures acquired the film rights to the Clue franchise under its TriStar Pictures label in April 2024.

=== Game shows ===
There have been several television game shows based upon this game. To date, there have been four seasons of the British version of Cluedo (and a Christmas version that in fact shows some similarity to the North American movie), and there have been other versions in Germany (Cluedo - Das Mörderspiel), France (Cluedo), Italy, Australia (Cluedo), Portugal (Cluedo) and Scandinavia (Cluedo - en mordgåta). The format for each puts two teams (each usually containing one celebrity and one person with law enforcement/research experience) against six in-character actors as the famed colour-coded suspects. There is a new murder victim every episode, who usually has it coming to them for one reason or another. Each episode uses different weapons. In the Christmas episode in the UK the six original weapons were used.

=== TV series ===
On August 6, 2010, The Hub announced that an original five-part miniseries based on Clue was in pre-production. The miniseries premiered on November 14, 2011 and featured a youthful, ensemble cast loosely based on the characters of the board game, working together to unravel a mystery. The short mini-series draws similarities to the original board game and mostly to the 2012 spin-off Clue: The Classic Mystery Game which both featured the characters belonging or having ties to secret societies/houses and fitting closely with the character descriptions.

Fox Entertainment greenlit an animated Clue series in 2021 in partnership with Hasbro's Entertainment One, with Bento Box Entertainment serving as co-production and the animation studio for the show. The series never materialized.

Sony Pictures Television acquired the television rights to Clue in April 2024. Plans for an unscripted Clue series at Hasbro Entertainment and Sony Pictures Television Nonfiction include a reality competition for Netflix. A scripted Clue series is in works at Peacock.

=== Documentary ===
The Clue title and theme were used in the 1986 US documentary Clue: Movies, Murders, and Mystery, which took a look at mystery-related pieces of media including Murder on the Orient Express; Murder, She Wrote; Sherlock Holmes and other television series and movies, as well as a look at the board game itself. The one-hour special was hosted by Martin Mull, who had starred in the feature film adaptation the previous year; clips from the movie are seen intertwined with the footage.

== Theatre ==
=== Musical ===
A comedic musical of Clue, based on the American version of the game, ran Off Broadway in 1997, closing in 1999. At the start of each performance, three audience members each select one card from oversized versions of the traditional game decks and place them in an envelope. The chosen cards determine the ending of the show, with 216 possible conclusions.

=== Play (1985) ===
Penned by Robert Duncan with the cooperation of Waddingtons, the first official theatrical adaptation of Cluedo was presented by the amateur theatre group: The Thame Players in Oxfordshire in July 1985. The play was subsequently picked up by Hiss & Boo productions and began a successful tour of the UK. A second tour was undertaken in 1990. Like the musical, the play involved the audience's random selection of three solution cards which were revealed towards the end of the play, whereupon the actors would then conclude the play by performing one of the 216 endings possible. Presently the play is not available for performance due to a restriction by Hasbro, since Hasbro has been planning to make a new movie. It is unclear whether the restriction applies to the musical as well.

=== Clue: On Stage ===
Based on the 1985 movie from Paramount Pictures, the play was written by Sandy Rustin. This version of the play also has been edited for a High School and Virtual performance environment. Unlike the other 2 stage adaptations, Clue: On Stage presents all endings, similar to the home video version of the movie.

=== Cluedo 2 – The Next Chapter ===
In 2024, a new British stage play, Cluedo 2 – The Next Chapter, written by Laurence Marks and Maurice Gran and directed by Mark Bell, premiered at the Richmond Theatre in London before touring the United Kingdom. A North American edition, Clue: The British Invasion, adapted by Yoni Weiss, is licensed by Concord Theatricals.

== Print ==
=== Books ===
A series of 18 humorous children's books/teen books were published in the United States by Scholastic Press between 1992 and 1997 based on the Clue concept and created by A. E. Parker. The books featured the US Clue characters in short, comedic vignettes and ask the reader to follow along and solve a crime at the end of each. Solutions are printed upside down, with an explanation, on the page following each chapter. The crime would usually be the murder of another guest besides Mr. Boddy, a robbery of some sort, or a simple contest, in which case they must figure out who won. The tenth and final vignette would always be the murder of Mr. Boddy. Somehow, Mr. Boddy would always manage to cheat death, such as fainting before the shot was fired or being shot with trick bullets. However, at the end of the 18th book, Mr. Boddy stays dead.

In 2003, Canadian mystery writer Vicki Cameron wrote Clue Mysteries, a new set of mini-mystery books. The series is geared toward a more adult audience while still retaining some comic absurdity of the 1990s series. Only two books were published; both feature more complex storylines and vocabulary, as well as fifteen mysteries apiece. The first book contains the more modern looking clue game cover by Drew Struzan.

Another book called "CLUE Code-Breaking Puzzles" was released in December 2008 written by Helene Hovanec. The book contains 60 mysteries.

A similar series of books featuring the Clue Jr. characters was also published. The first book, Who Killed Mr. Boddy? features thirteen mysteries. Mr Boddy is a trillionaire, and the guests are his friends. Each "friend" attempts to kill him at one point, intent to cash in on his will. The guests are all given some sort of defining characteristic for comic effect, as well as to help the reader discern the culprit. Colonel Mustard constantly challenges other guests to duels, Professor Plum often forgets things, and Mr. Green is notoriously greedy. Mrs. Peacock is highly proper and will not stand for any lack of manners, the maid Mrs. White hates her employer and all the guests, and Miss Scarlet is beautiful and seductive. Mr. Boddy himself is ludicrously naive, to the point where he accepts any attempt to kill him as an accident or a misunderstanding, and invites the guests back to the mansion. This explains why he never seeks any legal action against his "friends," and invited them back despite repeated attempts to kill him. He eventually wises up enough to be suspicious of them, but continues to invite them over against better judgement.

The Clue Jr. series originally had all six characters, but suddenly, some of the characters were taken out, leaving only four. The mysteries usually only included cases similar to the theft of a toy, but sometimes the cases were more serious. They are usually solved when the culprit traps himself in his own lies.

American author Diana Peterfreund wrote a trio of Clue Mystery titles that adapt the story for an elite boarding school: In the Hall with the Knife (2019), In the Study with the Wrench (2020), and In the Ballroom with the Candlestick (2021).

=== Comics ===
IDW Publishing has produced two limited series comics based on the franchise.

Clue was written by Paul Allor and released in 2017, set in the Hasbro Comic Book Universe alongside various other Hasbro properties.

Clue: Candlestick was written and illustrated by Dash Shaw and released in 2019, unrelated to the prior series and set in its own standalone continuity.

== Jigsaw puzzles ==
A series of jigsaw puzzles (500 piece Clue/750 piece Cluedo/200 Jr. ed.), based on the game was introduced in 1991. The jigsaw puzzles presented detailed stories with a biography for each of the standard suspects. The object was to assemble the jigsaw puzzles and then deduce the solutions presented in the mystery stories from the clues provided within the completed pictures. There were four titles in the 750 piece series: Death in the First Edition, Garden of Evil, Killers in the Kitchen, and Six Cases of Murder.
