= Cluedo (disambiguation) =

Cluedo (also known as Clue) is a murder mystery board game for three to six players.

Cluedo may also refer to:

- Cluedo (franchise), adaptations and spinoffs of the board game in several media, including:
  - Cluedo (Australian game show)
  - Cluedo (British game show)
  - Cluedo: Discover the Secrets, a 2008 board game designed by Hasbro as a modernization of the original Cluedo board game
  - List of Cluedo spinoff games, various games based on the Cluedo or Clue brands
  - List of Cluedo video games, video games using the Cluedo or Clue brands
    - Cluedo: Murder at Blackwell Grange, a 1998 video game
    - Clue (iOS game), known as "Cluedo" in the UK and Europe
    - Clue Chronicles: Fatal Illusion (also known as Cluedo Chronicles: Fatal Illusion), a 1999 PC point-and-click adventure game
    - Cluedo DVD Game, a 2006 interactive game for DVD players
- "Cluedo", a song by We Are the Physics from Your Friend, The Atom

== See also ==
- Clue (disambiguation), disambiguation page including variants and spin-offs of Cluedo released under its alternative name/brand, Clue
