= Alfred Hitchcock Edition Clue =

- Players: 3 to 6
- Setup time: 5 minutes
- Playing time: 45 minutes
- Chance: High
- Age range: 8 and up
- Skills: Dice rolling, Deduction

Alfred Hitchcock Edition Clue is a version of the board game Cluedo (Clue in North America) themed using elements from the films of Alfred Hitchcock.

== Development ==
USAopoly marked Alfred Hitchcock's 100th birthday on Friday, August 13, 1999, by releasing a special Hitchcock‑themed edition of Clue. The special edition replaces the traditional Clue suspects with characters drawn from Hitchcock's films, including figures such as Mother from Psycho, Melanie Daniels from The Birds, Michael Armstrong from Torn Curtain, and Marnie Edgar from Marnie. The game replaces its traditional rooms with locations drawn from Hitchcock's films, including Room No. 1 at the Bates Motel (Psycho), the Statue of Liberty's torch (Saboteur), and settings from The Man Who Knew Too Much and Frenzy. The game was also released as a special edition to celebrate the 50th anniversary of Clue.

== Game contents ==
- Instructions
- A game board, representing the location of the murder
- Six colored game pieces, representing the suspects
- Weapon pieces, representing possible weapons used
- Cards, containing depictions of game elements (weapons, suspects or rooms)
- A parchment envelope labeled, "Case File: Confidential", to hold the solution in each game.

== The suspects ==
- Miss Scarlett as Melanie Daniels from The Birds (a red piece)
- Colonel Mustard as Barry Kane from Saboteur (a yellow piece)
- Mrs. White as Jo McKenna from The Man Who Knew Too Much (a white piece)
- Mr. Green as Mother from Psycho (a green piece)
- Mrs. Peacock as Marnie Edgar from Marnie (a blue piece)
- Professor Plum as Michael Armstrong from Torn Curtain (a purple piece)

== Weapons ==
- The Necktie from Frenzy
- The Bomb from Saboteur
- The Knife from Psycho
- The Oven from Torn Curtain
- The Poker from Marnie
- The Seagull from The Birds

== The rooms ==
There are nine sets in the studio where the murder can take place, laid out on the board as follows:

†	Hitchcock's Screening Room	‡
Bates Motel; Room #1	Hitchcock's Screening Room	Diner (The Birds)
(Psycho)	Hitchcock's Screening Room
Farmhouse Kitchen (Torn Curtain)		Horse Stables (Marnie)
Farmhouse Kitchen (Torn Curtain)		Statue of Liberty Torch (Saboteur)
	Opera House (The Man Who; Knew Too Much)
Family Room (The Birds)	Opera House (The Man Who; Knew Too Much)	Brenda's Office (Frenzy)
‡	Opera House (The Man Who; Knew Too Much)	†

† ‡ denotes secret passages to opposite corner
