= 1940s in games =

== Games released or invented in the 1940s ==
- Conflict (1940)
- Cluedo (1947)
