= List of Cluedo characters =

This is a list of characters in the game of Cluedo (UK) / Clue (US).

== Victim ==
The victim of Cluedo/Clue is Dr. Black (UK) / Mr. Boddy (US), the wealthy owner of Tudor Mansion (formerly known as Tudor Close/Tudor Hall (UK) and Boddy Mansion/Boddy Manor (US)). He is the unseen host who is murdered, which inspires the quest to discover who murdered him, what room in his mansion the crime occurred, and with what weapon. Dr. Black was listed in the original patent filing as one of the ten characters created for the game, in which one character was drawn from the suspect cards to be the new victim before the start of a game. Mr. Boddy's name is a pun on the fact that the character is a dead body.

In the 2002 US edition, Mr. John Boddy was orphaned at a young age and raised by his uncle, Sir Hugh Black, and is also known by locals as Dr. Black. He is an eminent anthropologist and the heir of the late Sir Hugh's estate, which he is set to fully inherit on the day of his thirtieth birthday. Before then, Boddy discovered a series of secret allowances bequeathed to some of his uncle's former associates. Vowing to investigate these financial dealings, he invites his uncle's associates to Tudor Mansion for a weekend visit. However, Mr. Boddy is murdered by one of them.

In the 2023 edition of the game, the two names are combined into the character Boden "Boddy" Black Jr, a man who inherited his significant wealth. At the time of his murder in the game's updated story, he has used connections to government officials in Hue County, the game's setting, to push through permitting and construction on Boden Black Hotel, a luxury hotel that the public opposes.

In the 1985 film, Mr. Boddy is portrayed by Lee Ving and depicted as blackmailing the six suspects using his network of informants.

== Suspects ==
(left to right) Mrs. White, Mr. Green, Mrs. Peacock, Professor Plum, Miss Scarlet, and Colonel Mustard in the 1972 US edition

The original board game suspects in rolling order:

=== Miss Scarlett ===
Scarlett or Miss Scarlet (the second "t" was dropped in North American versions after 1963 and added back in 2016) is a stereotypical femme fatale, typically portrayed as young, cunning, and attractive. She rolls first in the game.

In Clue Master Detective, Miss Scarlet is depicted as an Asian woman nicknamed the "Mercenary of Macau" who is a fortune hunter.

In the 1985 film, she is portrayed by Lesley Ann Warren and depicted as a sassy Washington D.C. madam who runs an underground brothel.

In the 1990s ITV game show Cluedo, Vivienne Scarlet is the stepdaughter of Mrs. Peacock.

In the 1997 musical, Miss Scarlet used to work as a lounge singer in Las Vegas.

In the 2002 edition, Miss Scarlet was failed actress named Josephine Scarlet and estranged daughter of Patricia Peacock who took an interest in rich old men.

In the 2023 edition, she is a Black British gossip columnist and socialite who writes under the pen name "Cyan".

=== Colonel Mustard ===
Mustard or Colonel Mustard is a stock military officer who rolls second. He is usually portrayed as a dignified, dapper, and dangerous military man. Originally known as Colonel Yellow, his name was changed before the game's first edition was published.

In Clue Master Detective, his full name is Algernon Mustard and is known to sleep with a revolver under his pillow.

In the film, he is portrayed by Martin Mull and depicted as a war profiteer who sold stolen air force radios on the black market.

In the 1990s ITV game show Cluedo, Colonel Mike Mustard is an ex-officer of the Special Air Service and a regular visitor of Arlington Grange who is in a love triangle with Mrs. Peacock and her step-daughter Miss Scarlett.

In the 2002 US edition, he is Michael Mustard, a former officer of the Royal Hampshire Regiment, where he first met Sir Hugh. He is nostalgic for his war days and has convinced a publisher that his military exploits would make for a good book.

In the 2016 edition, Colonel Mustard is a successful and popular officer. However, behind his medals of honor are rumors of treason and war profiteering, which he has been paying someone to hide for far too long. Believing Mr. Boddy is blackmailing him, Mustard eagerly comes to Tudor Mansion in search of evidence.

In the 2023 edition, Colonel Mustard is a decorated war hero who would sway the public opinion in Mr. Boddy's favor, as long as nobody finds out he wasn't in the battle where he earned his most prestigious medal.

=== Mrs. White / Chef White ===
White or Mrs. White is usually portrayed as a frazzled servant who worked as Mr. Boddy's cook and housekeeper. Originally known as Nurse White before her name was changed following the first edition's publication, she rolls third in the game. Since then, many changes have been made to the character, many of which diverge from her working class origins.

In Clue Master Detective, she is Blanche White, a long-time maid to Mr. Boddy since the war who has an eye squint from spying in keyholes.

In the film, she is portrayed by Madeline Kahn and depicted as the widow of five husbands, all of whom died under mysterious circumstances.

In the 1990s ITV game show Cluedo, housekeeper and cook Mrs. Blanche White has worked for Mrs. Peacock at Arlington Grange for the past 25 years. Additionally, series one featured her husband Mr. White before the character was dropped.

In the 1997 musical, Mrs. White is the chief domestic at Boddy Manor.

In the 2002 edition, Mrs. Blanche White is the housekeeper and cook of Tudor Mansion who also served as the nanny of her current employer, Mr. John Boddy, during his childhood. Despite her years of dedicated service, she has little to show for it.

In Clue: Discover the Secrets, Diana White is a former child celebrity who desires to be in the spotlight again.

In the 2012 edition, White is an alias given to Alexis Villenueve, a lawyer who will do anything for justice, including turning vigilante.

In the 2016 edition, Mrs. White was replaced as a suspect by the new character Dr. Orchid.

The 2023 edition updated the character to Chef White, who sports short white hair, tattoos, and a modern chef's uniform. She worked for Boddy Black at one point before starting her own restaurant, using the budget money she skimmed from her old boss to fund it.

=== Reverend Green / Mr. Green / Mayor Green ===
Originally patented as "The Reverend Mr Green", Green is a hypocritical Anglican priest who wavers when the subject is murder. In North America, Mr. Green has taken money-oriented roles such as a mobster and businessman. Parker Brothers insisted on the name change, believing that the American public would object to a parson as a murder suspect. He rolls fourth in both versions.

In Clue Master Detective, he is Thallo Green who is a kingpin in the "family business".

In the film, Mr. Green is portrayed by Michael McKean and depicted as a closeted homosexual who is concerned that his secret might cost him his job as a State Department employee.

In the 1990s ITV game show Cluedo, Jonathan Green is a regular visitor at Arlington Grange.

In the 1997 musical, Mr. Green is an entrepreneur.

The 2002 edition attempted to combine the two variations of the character. Mr. John Green, also known as "Reverend Green", has a reputation for fraud, money laundering, and smuggling.

In the 2016 edition, Green is a charming con artist in hiding, disguised as a priest.

The 2023 edition updated the character to Mayor Green, the Mayor of Hue County who sports a goatee and a green business suit. Boden blackmails him into re-zoning the park where he plans to build his hotel with the fact that his last campaign was funded by a crime family.

=== Mrs. Peacock / Solicitor Peacock ===
Peacock or Mrs. Peacock is a stock femme fatale grande dame and a middle-aged woman who nearly always maintains her dignity and rolls fifth in the game.

In Clue Master Detective, her full name is Henrietta Peacock and is depicted as an elderly ornithologist with a specialty in birds of prey who saved the loggerhead shrike from extinction. She wanted Mr. Boddy to turn his manor into a bird sanctuary as part of a donation to the Peacock Salvation Society.

In the film, she is portrayed by Eileen Brennan and depicted as the wife of a U.S. Senator who is accused of taking bribes.

In the 1990s ITV game show Cluedo, Elizabeth Peacock is the stepmother of Vivienne Scarlet who resides in Arlington Grange.

In the 1997 musical, Mrs. Peacock is married to Mr. Boddy, her sixth husband, who is also pursuing an affair with Colonel Mustard.

In the 2002 edition, Mrs. Patricia Peacock is a femme fatale socialite and former actress who left England after becoming involved in a love triangle with two politicians. She is also the estranged mother of Josephine Scarlet.

The 2023 edition updated the character to Solicitor Peacock, a successful and tenacious attorney who knows how to command a room, court or otherwise. Upon learning of her tendency to tamper with witness testimonies, Boden Black blackmails her into representing him in his hotel dealings.

=== Professor Plum ===
Plum or Professor Plum is a stock absent-minded professor who rolls last in the game.

In Clue Master Detective, Edgar Plum is depicted as a shady archaeologist and the head of the local school's archaeology department who wanted Mr. Boddy to provide him financial backing for Middle East expedition in discovery of a unique prehistoric skeleton.

In the film, he is portrayed by Christopher Lloyd and depicted as a disgraced former psychiatrist who lost his medical license after having an affair with one of his patients.

In the 1990s ITV game show Cluedo, Professor Peter Plum is a regular visitor at Arlington Grange. In series 1, he was depicted as American before his nationality was changed to English for series 2 onward.

In the 1997 musical, Professor Plum has been demoted to the orchestra's piano player while a "dorky school teacher" disguised as him and three random audience members serve as accomplices in choosing the culprit, location, and murder weapon.

In the 2002 edition, Professor Peter Plum is an archaeologist and Egyptologist who formerly worked as the curator of the British Museum before he was fired due to allegations of plagiarizing his article on the dynasties of ancient Egypt from a deceased colleague. His Egypt expedition was previously funded by Mr. Boddy's uncle Sir Hugh Black.

In the 2023 edition, Professor Plum is an antiquary who produces forgeries. Boden Black blackmails him into forging documents that prove the legality of his hotel being built on a public park with the information that Plum's degree is itself forged.

=== Additional suspects ===
Parker Bros. released the Clue VCR Mystery Game in 1985, introducing four new characters to the lineup, the first such change in 36 years. The new characters also appeared in a number of spin-off games and licensed products, such as Clue Master Detective (1988).

==== Miss Peach ====
Miss Peach is a Southern belle who usually manipulates others with her charm.

In the VCR Game, Melba Peach is the daughter of M. Brunette who arrives by "accident".

In Clue Master Detective, Georgia Peach claims to be the long-lost grand-niece of Mr. Boddy.

In Clue Mysteries, Amelia Peach is the daughter of a wealthy American businessman and a famed British stage actress who had a happy childhood in America until her father's finances were ruined, causing her to drop out of law school. She now works as a secretary for her uncle's law firm in Hampshire, England.

==== Monsieur Brunette ====
Monsieur Brunette is a foreign con artist with many talents, passports, and accents who is usually a Frenchman intent on personal gain. His name is derived from "Mr. Brown", one of the game's oldest patented but unused player names.

In the VCR Game, M. Brunette is a con artist posing as a lawyer. He was originally named "Dr. Brown" in the prototype of the game.

In Clue Master Detective, Monsieur Alphonse Brunette is a fraudulent art and arms dealer who nearly made a killing selling the missing arms of the Venus de Milo.

==== Madame Rose ====
Madame Rose is a stock fortune-teller.

In the VCR Game, Madam Rose is Mr. Boddy's psychic sister.

In Clue Master Detective, Mme Rose is Mr. Boddy's ex-secretary of Hungarian heritage whose real name is Rhoda Rosengarten.

==== Sergeant / Inspector Gray ====
Sergeant Gray is a corrupt police officer. The name "Grey" was one of ten characters filed with the game's original patent. "Miss Grey" and "Mrs. Silver" are some of the oldest colour names previously unused, and "Gray" is one of the most enduring names in later editions, albeit with different characters depending on the edition.

In the VCR Game, Sgt. Gray is a crazed mental patient who escaped from the nearby asylum and evaded discovery by posing as a police officer.

In Clue Master Detective, Sgt. Gray is a no-nonsense, corrupt, unimaginative, and colorblind police officer who stumbles onto the crime scene while collecting funds for the Police Blackmail Awareness Fund.

Renamed Inspector Gray in the mobile game, he secretly worked with Dr. Black to drop tax evasion charges in exchange for a cut.

In Waddingtons' Cluedo Super Sleuth, Inspector Gray appears as a police inspector.

==== Dr. Orchid ====
In 2016, Hasbro introduced Dr. Orchid, a biologist of East Asian heritage who specializes in plant toxicology, dresses in her namesake color, and is introduced as the adopted daughter of Mr. Boddy / Dr. Black. After being expelled from an exclusive Swiss boarding school after a near-fatal poisoning incident, Orchid was home-schooled by the housekeeper, Mrs. White.

=== One-time suspects ===
In 1986, Super Cluedo Challenge and Super Sleuth were released in the UK, introducing the second wave of new board-game characters:

- Captain Brown (Super Cluedo Challenge) - A lower-class, drunk seaman who arrived at the mansion under mysterious circumstances.
- Mr. Slate-Grey (Super Cluedo Challenge) - A middle-aged lawyer or accountant in a grey suit.
- The Thief (Clue: The Great Museum Caper) - A thief who broke into a museum to steal paintings and is represented by a grey pawn.

=== Millennial suspects ===
Released in 2003, Clue FX is an electronic talking version of the game with audio voices and clues. Newly introduced characters are as follows:

- Lady Lavender - An honorable herbalist and occasional troublemaker of Asian heritage who may have poisoned her husband, Sir Laurence Lavender, and works to investigate Mr. Meadow-Brook's death. In Clue Mysteries, she is known as Su Sian.
- Mr. Meadow-Brook - The murder victim who served as Dr. Black / Mr. Boddy's unseen solicitor. In Clue Mysteries, he is known as Miles and is an occasional theft victim.
- Mrs. Meadow-Brook - Wife of the deceased Mr. Meadow-Brook. In Clue Mysteries, she is known as Jane. She is also a playable character in the 2006 Clue DVD game.
- Prince Azure - An "aristocratic" art and arms dealer. In Clue Mysteries, he is known as Philippe.
- Rusty Nayler - The bitter, old Tudor Mansion gardener.
- Lord Gray - A former army cartographer who designs gardens. In Clue Mysteries, he is known as Alfred.

=== Parker Brothers Mystery Game suspects ===
Released in 2017 by Hasbro, Parker Brothers Mystery Game is a budget board game which plays with virtually identical mechanics to Clue / Cluedo, with some exceptions. While the murder victim is unnamed, the six suspects are close analogues of the original characters or their canonical replacements:

- Madame Rubie - A red-headed femme fatale dressed in ruby, similar to Miss Scarlett, who is described as a cold yet elegant woman who "enjoys the finer things in life".
- General Umber - A gray-haired and bearded military man dressed in his namesake, similar to Colonel Mustard, who is described as a hero with "hard-won wisdom" who is potentially hiding a sinister secret.
- Mrs. Azul - A brunette dressed in a blue (Spanish: azul) party dress and a young analogue of Mrs. Peacock who is described as innocent yet "a mystery in her own right".
- Mr. Pine - A man dressed in a vest and analogue of Mr. Green. Nicknamed "the Hunter", he is described as "little more than a scoundrel" and someone who has "always gotten by on his good looks".
- Sir Ube - A dapper gentleman dressed in a purple suit and analogue of Professor Plum who is described as a charismatic yet shy academic who is "more comfortable in his research" than anywhere else. He is named for the ube.
- Dr. Rose - A woman dressed in a black dress and a rose top and pumps. She is a hybridization of Mrs. White and Dr. Orchid. In her bio, she is described as "the life of any party", though she is hinted as possessing "something dark behind her laughter".

=== Clue: Conspiracy suspects ===
In 2023, Hasbro Pulse released Clue: Conspiracy, which introduces five new characters in addition to the classic six and is set at a remote island retreat called the Black Adder Resort. The Black Adder Resort later appeared in the DLC for the 2023 video game.

- Mr. Coral - The hotel manager of the Black Adder Resort and business partner of the late Boden Black Jr. who invites the guests to the resort to investigate Black's death.
- Director Rosewood - A middle-aged corporate director who is dishonest about her investments. She wears a dark pink color similar to that of Madame Rose.
- Agent Gray - An intimidating middle-aged government agent with a fake badge who wears a gray suit.
- Analyst Hyacinth - A young forensic analyst capable of recognizing falsified evidence. She wears a light purple-blue color similar to that of her namesake.
- Dean Celadon - A private school dean who pays for his students to get into their dream colleges. He wears a teal jacket over a celadon shirt.

== Other characters ==
In 1995, Waddingtons released Cluedo Super Sleuth which introduced two new characters:

- Hogarth – The butler and a non-playable character who blocks spaces.
- The Black Dog – A non-playable character dog who blocks spaces.

In Clue FX, two new characters were introduced:

- Mr. Ash – The butler of Tudor Mansion and narrator of the game.
- Inspector Brown – A police inspector who comes to investigate the murder of Miles Meadow-Brook. In Clue Mysteries, released in 2005, Brown informs the players which suspects are lying.

In 2009, Electronic Arts released an iOS version of Clue.

- Editor Braunman (Cluedo iOS) – Appearing only on the menu screens, he is the editor-in-chief who sends the reporter to gather material and solve the murder case in an allotted time.
- The Reporter (Cluedo iOS) – The player character who works as a journalist.

== Children's editions ==
Several variants of the game have been developed for children, most notably Clue Jr. and Cluedo Jr., which usually involve the disappearance of something or someone rather than a murder. These variants generally use the standard six surnames with different first names or titles, often changing the gender of the original character.

The UK edition of Cluedo Jr. introduced the first animal players or suspects: Samantha Scarlett, Mustard the Dog, Wendy White, George Green, Polly Peacock, and Peter Plum.

Cluedo Junior Detective introduced Inspector Cluedo and his bloodhound Watson, who invites his eight nieces and nephews: Jake Plum, Natalie Peacock, Jessica Scarlett, Spike Mustard, Robbie Green, Megan White, and Beth Peach; as well as investigator Tom Black.

== Film ==
In 1985, Cluedo/Clue began expanding its character roster and served as the premise for a film of the same name:

- The Butler – The rare butler character is usually most connected with the audience, sometimes anonymous, or else named Wadsworth, Didit, Ashe, and Hogarth in related official media. In the film, Wadsworth is portrayed by Tim Curry.
- The Inspector – Typically working for Scotland Yard, the inspector appears anonymously or as Pry, Brown, or Gray in related official media. In the film, the Chief of Police is portrayed by an uncredited Howard Hesseman and first appears disguised as an evangelist.
- Yvette – A young French maid at Hill House who originally worked for Miss Scarlett as a call girl, portrayed by Colleen Camp.
- Mrs. Ho – The cook at Hill House and Mrs. Peacock's former cook, portrayed by Kellye Nakahara.
- The Motorist – A middle-aged man and Colonel Mustard's driver during World War II, portrayed by Jeffrey Kramer.
- The Cop – An unnamed police officer, portrayed by Bill Henderson.
- The Singing Telegram Girl – An unnamed singing telegram girl and former patient of Professor Plum, portrayed by Jane Wiedlin.

== Television ==
In 1990, Cluedo inspired several television series which (in addition to the standard six characters) created additional characters – primarily victims. The most notable recurring character in the UK series was Mr. White while the Australian series introduced Det. Sgt. Stanley Bogong, who also appeared in French, German and Swedish versions.

== Books ==
Clue Jr., a "Let's Read and Play" book written by Sara Miller and illustrated by Jim Talbot released in 2004, introduced five new suspects: a butler, a cook, a gardener, a maid, and a repairman.

== Characters in other media ==
In the first half of 1985, Mobil joined Cluedo to introduce three new characters as part of its "Mobil £5 Million Cluedo Mystery" contest game: Sir Peach, Lady Oakwood, and Dr. Prussian. The characters were added along with three additional murder weapons to balance the game's playing elements. Of the three, only the name "Peach" would be re-used for other characters.

Clue Chronicles: Fatal Illusion, Hasbro's short-lived interactive video game series set in 1938, added five characters to the usual six: Ian Masque, an eccentric millionaire who invites the original suspects and new characters to his isolated Swiss mountain estate for a mysterious dinner party; Marina Popov, an attractive, blonde Russian psychic; Martin Urfe, a mediocre magician hired by Masque to entertain his guests who may be a fraud; Sabata, a deranged Spanish artist; and Dr. Julia Kell, an aging German psychoanalyst who may have Nazi ties.
