= The king of hearts has five sons =

Card game

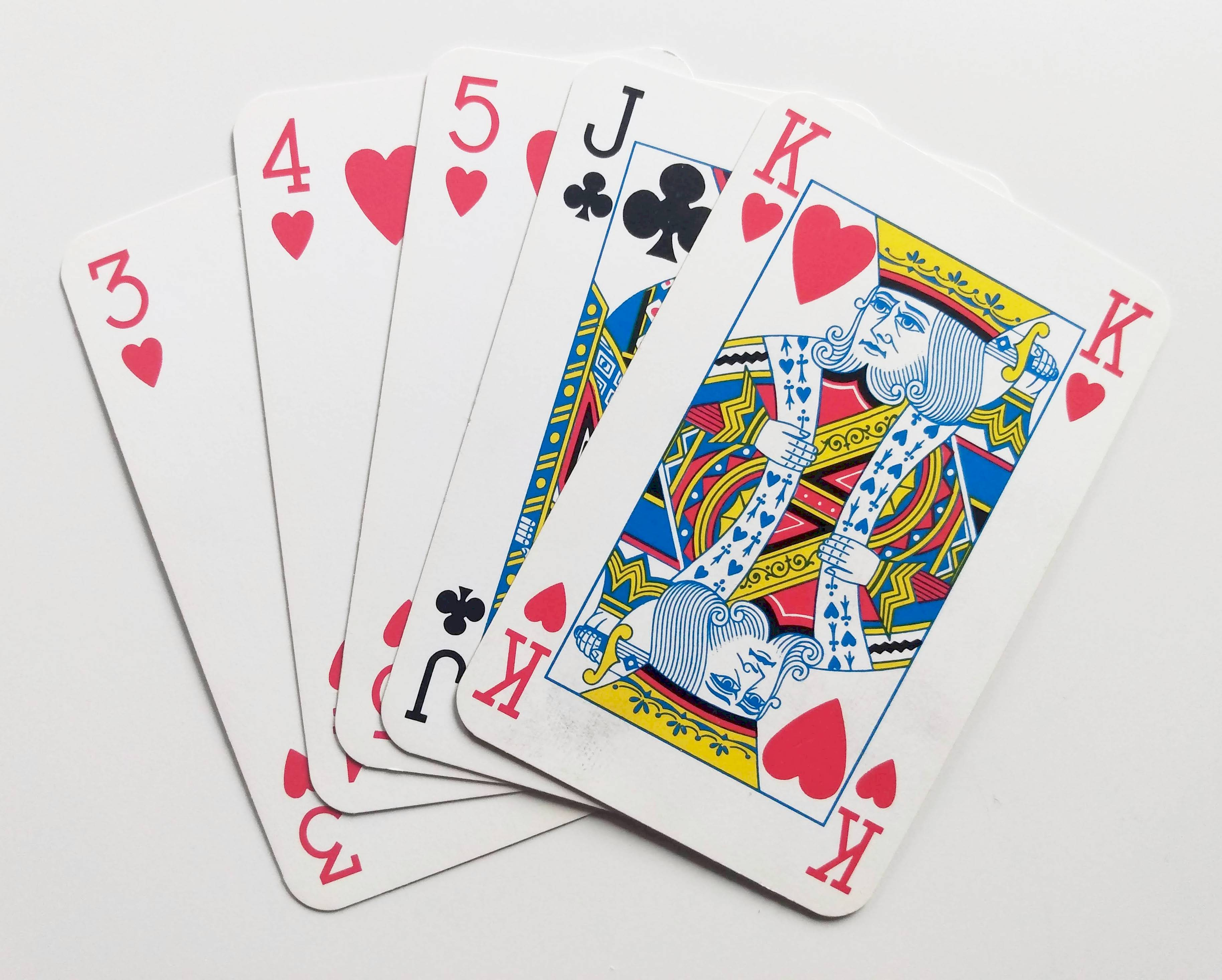
If the player holding this hand of cards is prompted with the sentence "The king of hearts has five sons", they must reveal either the king of hearts, or the five of hearts

The king of hearts has five sons is a little-known, but traditional American deduction card game. Its methodology is similar to that of the well-known 1943 board game Cluedo, with game historian Bruno Faidutti writing that the card game may be a predecessor, having been taught the game by an American who recalled playing it in school prior to World War II.

== Rules ==
The following rules are based on Faidutti and Branham,supplemented by CatsatCards.com:

The king of hearts has five sons is best played by four or five players. The game uses the twelve court cards (four jacks, four queens and four kings), as well as the ten heart cards (ace through ten).

Before the game starts, the twelve court cards are shuffled and one card is removed from them at random and placed face down in the middle of the table, without any player seeing its face. Likewise the ten heart cards are shuffled and one is placed on the table. The remaining twenty cards are then shuffled together and dealt to each player.

The game itself resembles Cluedo. The aim is, through skilful questioning and logical deduction, to work out which two cards (one court card and one numbered heart) are face down in the middle of the table.

The first player begins by asking the neighbour on their left to reveal certain cards. For example, the first player, wanting to find out whether the second has the queen of spades and three of hearts, would say: "The queen of spades has three sons."

- If the neighbour has both, either one of them is shown to the questioner without revealing it to anyone else.
- If the neighbour only has one of the two cards, it is shown to the questioner without revealing it to anyone else.
- Lacking both cards, the neighbour repeats the question to the next player on the left in turn and this continues until a player reveals one of the two cards.

Once a player has revealed a card, the next player may ask a question. After a question has been posed, any player has the right to name a solution. To do so, the suspected solution is written down on a piece of paper and the player looks at the face-down cards.

If the suspicion is:

- Correct, the game ends and the player who guessed the two cards correctly has won.
- Wrong, the guesser lays the two cards face down again in the centre of the table and the game continues. The player who guessed wrongly now knows the answer and cannot go on to win, but remains in the game to answer questions.
