= Clue (1998 video game) =

- Boxart
- Developer: Engineering Animation, Inc.
- Publisher: Hasbro Interactive
- Designer: Rick Raymer
- Engine: Custom
- Platform: Windows
- Release: 1998
- Genres: Strategy, board game
- Modes: Single Player, Multiplayer

Clue (known as Cluedo outside of North America) is a 1998 video game based on the board game of the same name. It is also known as Clue: Murder at Boddy Mansion or Cluedo: Murder at Blackwell Grange, depending on whether the country of release used American or British English.

Clue runs on Microsoft Windows. It was developed in 1998 for Hasbro Interactive by EAI. Infogrames (now Atari) took over publishing rights for the game in 2000 when Hasbro Interactive went out of business. The game, just like the board game, is meant for 3-6 players due to the six suspects. The game garnered generally positive reviews upon release.

Engineering Animation released a spin-off named Clue Chronicles: Fatal Illusion in 1999.

== Development ==
Clue was developed by a branch of Engineering Animation, Inc. known as EAI Interactive. The development process was divided between EAI's interactive division located in Salt Lake City, Utah, and its main office in Ames, Iowa. While the majority of the programming and game design activities were conducted in Salt Lake, the Ames office focused on art and animations. The creation of the in-game mansion, built piece by piece, initially began in Ames but shifted to Salt Lake City midway through the project.

The primary motivation for developing the game was to enhance and rectify the shortcomings of the previous 1992 version, which was criticized for subpar AI, board presentations, and game mechanics. The new iteration of Clue sought to rectify these issues, with a particular emphasis on improving the artificial intelligence of computer players within the game.

The development of Clue spanned approximately one year, with funding provided by the game's publisher, Hasbro Interactive. Chris Nash, Lead Programmer on the project, described the experience as both enjoyable and challenging, especially during crunch times near the project's conclusion.

Nash explained the design process, highlighting the collaboration between the development team and Hasbro, the publisher. He acknowledged that Hasbro had the final say on graphical treatments, with one notable flaw being the lack of visual representation for suggestions made within the game. Nash discussed the challenge of aligning the UI design with both the Game Designer's vision and Hasbro's preferences. Despite some design conflicts, Nash emphasized that Hasbro's involvement generally did not involve excessive micromanagement. The characters' designs, particularly that of Miss Scarlet, underwent iterations before finalization. Nash also addressed an unconfirmed rumor that Miss Scarlet's appearance was modeled after the game's producer, Virginia.

The development team for Clue included numerous individuals who contributed to various aspects of the game, such as programming, art, design, and testing. Notable contributors included Michael S. Glosecki, Bryan Brandenburg, Tom Zahorik, Virginia McArthur, Rick Raymer, Tim Zwica, Joshua Jensen, and others.

Clue enjoyed a longer shelf life than typical for video games. It remained available for purchase years after its 1998 release, either as a standalone product or part of collections such as the Classic Game Collection. The game's availability was also promoted through tie-ins, including distribution with breakfast cereal and other Hasbro video games. The longevity of Clue was in part attributed to its association with the 50th anniversary of the original Clue board game.

=== Artificial Intelligence ===
The artificial intelligence (AI) implemented in Clue for computer-controlled opponents was considered advanced for a digital board game conversion. The AI's ability to deduce solutions led to customer complaints of cheating, although the AI simply outperformed the average human player. The AI recorded players' suggestions and tracked information often overlooked by human players. This allowed the AI to deduce which cards players possessed without explicitly asking about them.

Three difficulty levels for the AI were provided, with the hardest level utilizing the entire game history for decision-making. The AI's development was led by Mike Reed, based on a design by Bob Pennington. Independent studies demonstrated the AI's effectiveness in making deductions about the game's case file contents.

The success of Clue led to the reuse of its 3D characterizations in the Cluedo-inspired title Fatal Illusion.

== Gameplay ==
The game has the same objective as the board game it is based on: to find the murderer, the room which housed Mr. Boddy/Dr. Black's demise, and the weapon used.

In addition to play by the original rules, Clue has an additional mode that allows movement via "points". Each turn begins with nine points and every action the player takes costs points. The player can only do as many things as he has points. For example, moving from square to square costs one point, making a suggestion costs three points. Many players prefer this mode of play as it makes the game more balanced since each player gets the same number of "moves" each turn.

A few features of Clue:

- Detailed depictions of the characters made famous by the board game.
- A 3D isometric view.
- A top down view reminiscent of the board game.
- Video clips of the characters carrying out the crime.
- Online play via the Internet.

The Providence Journal described the game as having a "film-noir environment (like a murder-mystery movie of the 1940s)". Christian Spotlight explains that these can be switched off if one so chooses.

AllGame explains that "each room is richly created in loving detail, complete with exotic period furniture and secret passages. Both the mood and gameplay is enhanced by the deep, sonorous voice of the Butler as he announces events as they occur". Spong says: "Cluedo takes place mostly in the house where the murder was committed, creating a chilling atmosphere. Environments are beautifully rendered, featuring all characters from the original board game in full 3D".

Cnet explains, "Clue offers full animations of the characters walking from room to room. While this is interesting for a while, you'll probably want to play with the standard overhead view of the board. Along with the animations is a really good soundtrack that includes sounds of the storm outside the mansion and a forbidding butler who calls out each suggestion as it is played". It adds, "the "autonotes" feature that takes notes as to what cards you've seen doesn't record what suggestions have already been made, so making educated guesses as to which cards people don't have by their suggestions becomes a pen and paper experience".

The background music is inspired by genres such as jazz and film noir. Christian Spotlight said that "the music is a bit annoying, simply replaying the same bars over and over and over again. Thankfully, the music is quiet and not much of a distraction". It also added: "Click on some of the objects in each area and be surprised by the many short animations that unfold".

Spong says: "A multi-player option over LAN offers something new to Cluedo that only a video game can accomplish. Whether your playing head to head or co-operatively, the experience makes the game much more sociable and enjoyable. And it's quite possible that this gameplay addition alone makes Cluedo: Murder at Blackwell Grange a thoroughly playable experience". The game was originally connected to the MSN Gaming Zone, but MSN stopped hosting the game. In-game links to online play now go to an invalid URL address. Christian Spotlight says: "The Internet play is absolutely flawless, even over a slow Internet connection. The game is stable and is supported quite well. Play with a few friends or family members around the computer or across the Internet. But for large groups in a single location, the original board game is much more easier than cramping around the computer keyboard and mouse".

The game uses an algorithm that allows it to be reusable, so that multiple levels are not needed. In Clue, "the idea is that of starting a new game each time. This particular game places a new puzzle to the player every new game so that the game is new to him/her every time" - having a different 3-card solution - despite using exactly the same game mechanics.

== Cutscenes ==
=== Opening ===
The video opens on a view outside Blackwell Grange/Boddy Manor. The view cuts to the inside hall with the game's murderer, holding a lit candlestick, walking down the hall and entering one of the rooms. The candle is extinguished and silhouetted via a lightning flash, an indeterminate human figure prepares to strike the victim when the video cuts to the game's title.

=== Deal ===
Mr. Boddy/Dr. Black's spirit has returned to shuffle the cards and hand them out the players, in order for them to discover how he was murdered then puts the three cards representing the game's murderer, room and weapon in a briefcase. Clue is a direct conversion of the original game as a video game.

=== Murder ===
Every possible suspect and method of killing the victim is represented via a custom cutscene when a suggestion is made. These cutscenes are played through Mr. Boddy/Dr. Black's perspective. For example:

- The suspect stabbing with or throwing a knife at him
- Hanging, hitting, or strangling him with the rope
- Hitting him with the candlestick, wrench, or lead pipe
- Shooting him with a revolver

=== Jail ===
When the game is solved, the game's true killer walks into a jail cell and the door closes. The character's actions in the scene are as follows:

- Either Miss Scarlet (who poses), Colonel Mustard (who stands to attention), or Mrs. White (who dusts the wall) entering the jail cell
- Mr. Green lying on the bed
- Mrs. Peacock sitting on the bed
- A sad Professor Plum sitting on a toilet

== Reception ==
AllGame gave the game 3 out of 5, commenting that "the game's graphics and sound are excellent and add to the escalating feel of suspense", while adding that "so much is happening in the visually stunning backgrounds, or the deep, sinister soundtrack" that the sometimes-slow pace of the board game is unnoticeable. In a 1999 MABM review, Helen Ubinas said: "Whoever thought of moving this classic to disc had a clue". Computer Gaming World thought the game was "stunning", and thought the "sexy...mysterious" soundtrack could have been made for a feature film.

GameSpot gave it a rating of 7.6, saying: "Basically, if you love the board game, you're going to want this version. And if you haven't played the board game, buy this instead". CNET gave the game a 3.5-star rating, writing "this is probably more fun than playing the board game", while concluding that "overall, this is one of the best translations to the PC that Hasbro has ever done. Beyond the simple fault of some extra features that weren't implemented to their best effect, there aren't really many faults with the game". Christian Spotlight gave the game a rating of 4.5 out 5 stars, while Gamezebo gave the game a 4 out of 5 star rating.

The game was named "Video Game of the Week" on 1999-02-06 in the Fresno Bee.

== See also ==
- Cluedo characters
- Clue, the movie
- Clue (board game)
