= Clue Classic =

2008 video game

- Developer: Games Cafe
- Publisher: Reflexive Entertainment
- Platforms: Windows; Mac OS X
- Release: June 3, 2008
- Genre: Puzzle game
- Mode: Single-player

Clue Classic is a single-player, interactive video game based on Hasbro's Cluedo franchise. It was developed by Games Cafe and published by Reflexive Entertainment on June 3, 2008.

== Reception ==
BoardGameBeast rated the game 4 out of 5 stars, describing it as "a truly perfect rendition of the classic English board game [with] great graphics and creepy atmosphere". It criticised the lack of multiplayer option, and the fact that Hasbro stopped download editions. Gamezebo rated the game 4 stars out of 5, saying the good included "animations and sound effects; faithfully reproduces tabletop edition's mechanics; charm and personality; eliminates much of the real game's hands-on busywork", and the bad included "no head-to-head multiplayer; can get repetitive; need to sit through canned animations".
