= Cluedo DVD Game =

- Publishers: Hasbro; Parker Brothers
- Series: Cluedo
- Release: October 2005
- Genre: Interactive board game

Cluedo DVD Game is a deduction/murder-mystery interactive DVD movie game based on the Cluedo franchise. It was published by Hasbro and Parker Brothers in the US in 2006, and designed by Rob Daviau. Previously, the Cluedo DVD Game had been released in the UK in October 2005, shortly followed by a French edition. It supports 3-5 players, and each case runs about 60 minutes.

== Development ==
BoardGamesPub notes:

The Clue DVD Game is not the first Clue game to include an interactive component. It was preceded by a Parker Brothers game called the Clue VCR Mystery Game, which is now out-of-print and collectible. This precursor to the Clue DVD Game saw some popularity because it spawned a sequel, called Clue II Murder in Disguise - A VCR Mystery Game. Both of these VCR games were published in the mid to late 1980s.

== Plot and gameplay ==
The box explains: "The DVD brings you inside Tudor Mansion where Inspector Brown is waiting with information on events of the day. Ashe the Butler is also there, ready to share some clues of his own. Remember to stay alert! You never know what you'll find in a room or run across in a Secret Passage. Like classic Clue, you'll make Suggestions, but in Clue DVD your Accusations are made secretly using the DVD. And keep that Red Reader close at hand... there are secrets in these cases and information you'll need to decipher."

There are 10 suspects, 11 items, 11 rooms, and 10 times of the day. Some of the rooms are located outside the mansion.

The game has 10 mysteries for players to unravel:

1. The Monte Carlo Affair
2. The Garden Party
3. A Bad Sport
4. The Hunt
5. The Autumn Leaves
6. The Costume Party
7. Spring Cleaning
8. A Princess Is Born
9. A Grand Ball
10. The Last Straw

In addition, the DVD contains encrypted files for an additional 2 mysteries that were apparently dropped before final production. With some work, these mysteries may be played in full using the files found on the DVD:

1. Christmas at the Mansion (occurs between The Autumn Leaves and The Costume Party)
2. A Dark and Stormy Night (occurs between Spring Cleaning and A Princess Is Born)

== Critical reception ==
TheArtOfMurder wrote, "Overall, this is a lovely game, but the animation could have been so much better. The game also takes forever to set up as players wade through the menus and then the computer selects which characters are used in the game instead of allowing the player to choose." BoardGamesPub noted, "On Amazon, out of 41 reviews, 28 of them gave the game four or five stars, while nine reviewers gave the game one star. Players seem to either love it or hate it, and most of them seem to love it." AboutHome named the game the 3rd best board game of 2006. The site said "This is everything a DVD game should be. The 10 cases included on the DVD are terrific fun, while the one random case offers replay value." It described "the system used to make sure the DVD knows which cards are in the envelope, movement on the board and through secret passages, the locked doors, [and] the butler" as "fantastic" and "elegant". It concluded the review by saying "Other developers working on DVD games should study this one to see how it's done right." Tom Vasel of RPG.net wrote "I must say that Clue: the DVD game is, in my opinion, the definitive form of Clue. It's much more enjoyable, giving me a challenge when playing. All of my problems with the original Clue game have been solved, and the DVD enhances the experience, rather than overwhelming it." Drake's Flames praised that the game "reinvents Clue - and makes it fun again" and having impressive components, while criticised the "cheesy 3D animation [that] looks like bad Nickelodeon cartoons" and the slower pace of games. ISSUU said the DVD game offers entertainment that required deduction and offers a completely new amount of enjoyment from the Cluedo franchise. When asked to recommend a game for the "ordinary non-game-fanatic" person, About.com board/card game maintainer Erik Arneson said in a 2007 interview with The Tuscaloosa News: "I'd definitively go with the Clue DVD game., which is just brilliant, absolutely the best DVD game that's been made so far. DVD players can be pretty stupid machines, so they can't do a whole lot, but the Clue DVD drags as much out of the technology as possible".

The game was a 2006 Årets Spill Best Family Game Nominee.

Its sales rank was #45797 in Toys & Games, and it was considered "one of the best seller product in marketing today".
