= Clue (mobile games) =

2009 iOS game

There have been two distinct mobile adaptations of the Hasbro board game Clue (known as Cluedo outside North America).

Clue: Unravel the Clues and Crack the Case was based on the most recent spin-off game of Cluedo: Discover the Secrets. It was developed by EA Montreal and published by Electronic Arts for iOS on May 29, 2009. It was removed from sale in 2014. Cluedo: The Classic Mystery Game was released for iOS and Android mobile devices, developed and published by British company Marmalade Game Studio on December 26, 2016. It was later released on Steam in May 2018, and again to the Nintendo Switch in December the same year.

== Clue: The Classic Mystery Game (2016) ==
Clue: The Classic Mystery Game
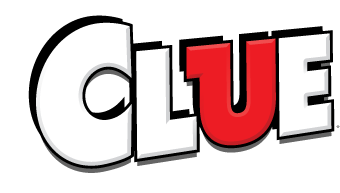
- Developer: Marmalade Game Studio
- Publisher: Marmalade Game Studio
- Platforms: App Store, Google Play, Steam, Nintendo Switch
- Release: December 26, 2016
- Genres: Board game, Strategy,
- Mode: Single-player

=== Gameplay ===
The object of the game is to determine who killed the game's victim Dr. Black, with what weapon and in which room. The player, as one of the six suspects will ask questions, and take notes. The overall goal is to solve the crime first. The mansion and character tokens are represented in 3D during the dice rolling phase, where during the suggestion phase there is a transition to a 2D room scene with representational character art, with several different poses for each character. The game features a virtual Clue Sheet. When suggestions are made and answered, ticks and crosses are automatically added to show which characters do or do not have particular cards. Players are also able to manually make their own notations, including numeric subscripts, that allow them to use advanced deduction techniques. The game can be played against 3 to 5 AI opponents, each of which can be set to Easy, Medium or Hard difficulty. Clue provides support for single player, against the AI and multiplayer with people around the world online or offline.

=== Development ===
Following on from a mobile adaptation of The Game of Life, Marmalade Game Studio and Hasbro extended their relationship with the release of Clue: The Classic Mystery Game (known as Cluedo: The Official 2017 Edition outside North America). The game was created with Unity.

=== Reception ===
BoardGameGeek said: "Overall, it is well-polished and well done if you want to play a quick game of Clue against the AI, but there is no multiplayer and no pass-and-play, so it is limited in many respects". The slow AI turns were also criticised.

Android Police said: "Though the core gameplay remains the same, the digital version of Clue is filled to the brim with new character art, animations, music and sound effects, and possibly the most elaborate Clue board ever made".

== Clue: Unravel the Clues and Crack the Case (2009) ==
Clue: Unravel the Clues and Crack the Case
- Developer: EA Montreal
- Publisher: Electronic Arts
- Platform: iOS
- Release: May 29, 2009
- Genre: Puzzle game
- Mode: Single-player

=== Plot and gameplay ===
Rather than being a board game, Clue played out more like a simple point-and-click game where the player traveled around the rooms from the mansion to collect clues from the 6 suspects to decipher whodunnit. Each case was time limited, and every action taken used up a set amount of time. Successfully making a correct suggestion within the allotted time gave the player the maximum 4-star score for the level. The player character is a reporter who has to get the top story to solve a case, and get a promotion.

=== Development ===
Game designer Elijah Renard explained:

When working at EA Mobile, my second project was Clue Mobile. Since Hasbro was also re-branding Clue/Cluedo, we were given lots of freedom regarding gameplay. The core essence of the game obviously had to be Clue/Cluedo, but we could make new rules and new ways to solve the mystery. At this point, we knew we liked the concept and core game mechanic, but how would this paper prototype translate into a mobile game? It was time to prototype with my good old friend Adobe Flash. Within about a week of Movieclips and ActionScript we could navigate in the mansion, talk to suspects, search objects and use the core annotation tools. We were very satisfied and confident this would work so I went back to my desk and started to write the famous Game Design Document. We created a level design tool so I could integrate all the scenarios and puzzles, while supporting our external writer.

As of 2014, EA removed Clue from the App Store along with several older titles. Users who have previously bought the game can restore it to their devices via iTunes.

=== Reception ===
148apps gave the game 4 out of 5 stars: "Albeit quite different from the traditional Clue board game experience, this app is an excellent mystery solving puzzler. For any fan of murder mysteries, even lovers of the original Clue board game, Clue for the iPhone is a great addition to the app inventory". AppSafari rated the game 2.5 out of 5: "You know the saying "As the official CLUE app", I was expecting a standard board game app in the style of Trivial Pursuit or Monopoly, but this goes a completely different direction, following in the footsteps of a point and click adventure game, only really, really badly", though noted "the art and sound look great, and the interface is smooth and intuitive". AppSpy gave the game the highest rating of 5, praising the "great visual style and artwork", the ease of "controls and screen navigation", and the "challenging puzzle game" elements, while criticising it for being single player only, and that "this reinvention of Clue is a definite change from the original and may take some time to get used to". AppVee described Clue as a "Flash game", and noted it was reminiscent of the old Carmen Sandiego games where characters told the player clues to advance along the level. It noted the game gets quite hard toward the later levels and takes some problem solving skills to complete. It praised the "beautiful" art direction, though criticised its "frustrating" gameplay.

Slidetoplay gave the game its highest score of 4 (Must Have), concluding: "Besides being more difficult than the original, which might turn off a few people, this new version improves on the original in every way. It takes a timeless game concept and makes it fresh without sacrificing any of the fun...Clue fans looking for straight port may be disappointed, but this reinvention is brilliantly clever and provides hours of sleuthing". GatdgetReview gave the game 9/10, writing that Clue "takes a classic board game and seamlessly translates it to a portable medium with virtually no glitches at all". PocketGamer wrote: "Clearly a game that's had some thought put into it, Cluedo's bucketfuls of style only add to an already great game".

== See also ==
- Cluedo video games
