= Clue (miniseries) =

- Created by: Raven Metzner
- Directed by: Terry McDonough
- Starring: Sterling Beaumon; Sarah Desjardins; Kendall Amyre Ferguson; Ana Golja; Stephan James; Zach Mills
- Country of origin: United States
- Original language: English
- No. of seasons: 1
- No. of episodes: 5

Production
- Executive producers: Raven Metzner; Terry McDonough; Brian Goldner; Stephen Davis; Brian Lenard; Karen Moore
- Camera setup: Single camera
- Running time: 23 minutes
- Production companies: Metzner Films; Slow Genius; Hasbro Studios

Original release
- Network: The Hub
- Release: November 14 – November 17, 2011

Clue is an American five-part mystery television miniseries based on the Parker Brothers board game of the same name, which aired on The Hub from November 14, 2011, to November 17, 2011. The series features a youthful, ensemble cast working together, uncovering clues to unravel a mystery.

The series was created by Raven Metzner and stars Sterling Beaumon as Seamus, Sarah Desjardins as Whitney, Kendall Amyre Ferguson as Agnes, Ana Golja as Liz, Stephan James as Dmitri, and Zach Mills as Lucas.

== Premise ==
The series follows six very different young sleuths nicknamed after the characters from the game of the same American name as they witness a terrible crime and embark on a mysterious adventure they could never have imagined. Along the way, they find they have more in common than they thought, as they uncover hidden treasures and decipher cryptic knowledge to reveal a dark and secret society.

== Characters ==
L to R: Agnes, Dmitri, Liz, Seamus, Whitney and Lucas

=== Main ===
The cast bears some similarities to the 2012 spin-off Clue: The Classic Mystery Game, which also features secret societies/houses.

- Seamus (Sterling Beaumon), Rebel without a cause, and attitude to spare. Seamus has been kicked out of three schools, and he definitely doesn't go to Lakeside Prep with the rest of the Clue crew. He's got mad skateboard skills and gets everywhere on his deck, but free time is tight because he works as a busboy at a hotel after school. Rumor has it Seamus runs with the Gr$$n Scene a super cool and exclusive street art crew. The character of Seamus is loosely based on the character of Mr. Green from the original board game. The insignia is a pair of green film reels suggesting this house is focused on the arts.
- Whitney Burrows (Sarah Desjardins), Whitney is working overtime to save the world. Petitions, fundraisers, marches, door-to-door outreach—she does them all. Whitney has never met a good cause she did not want to support, and is currently volunteering for "White Lights for a Better Future." But does all that signature-gathering and clipboard-waving leave time for a personal life? She is in a relationship with Lucas. The character of Whitney is loosely based on the character of Mrs. White from the original board game. The insignia is a white pair of scales suggesting this house concerns itself with justice and equality.
- Agnes Peabody (Kendall Amyre Ferguson), Agnes is all about what's going on where, with whom, and why. She reads all the blogs and magazines, so no news gets by her. (The Eyes of the Peacock is her very own site.) This style-obsessed search engine diva finds major dirt on people when she's barely trying. It's amazing what folks leave lying around on the Internet. But not Agnes: She likes finding news, not making it. According to Dmitri, Agnes posts gossip on a site that uses 'Peacock' in its title. The character of Agnes is loosely based on the character of Mrs. Peacock from the original board game. The insignia is a crossed pair of blue keys, possibly alluding to the saying “communication is key“ which would fit with the peacock pamphlet.
- Liz Handley (Ana Golja), Hottie with a heart of gold. She lives life with the volume cranked—always on the move, changing plans, and somehow finding herself in the spotlight wherever she goes. But she's not totally into herself ... she's got a really good soul to match that killer smile. Adopted at birth, she retains a 'House of Scarlet' necklace from her birth parents. The character of Liz is loosely based on the character of Miss Scarlett from the original board game. The insignia is a Scarlett Rose on a shield; the house's focus is unknown.
- Dmitri Grant (Stephan James), Dmitri is varsity everything, and on Lakeside's Dean's List too. His dad's a major mogul, so Dmitri's whole future is mapped out. That's a lot of pressure. So how does he blow off steam? He's into a multi-player strategy game called "M.U.S.T.A.R.D. MISSIONS"—and he's the only one on his server at the "Colonel" level. The character of Dmitri is loosely based on the character of Colonel Mustard from the original board game. The insignia is a yellow lion on a shield suggesting this house is connected to the military.
- Lucas Morganstern (Zach Mills), Lucas is a total brainiac, but he's no quiet nerd. His IQ is so high he is already a member of the Plum Institute. He can crack any puzzle or game, so you'd pick him to be your partner on a game show. Even so, he worries he's the kind of guy girls are only friends with. He will be a huge success in a couple years, but right now, girls are one puzzle he just can't solve. Seamus throws various plum insults at Lucas and even calls him Professor Plum a few times. He is in a relationship with Whitney. The character of Lucas is loosely based on the character of Professor Plum from the original board game. The insignia is a purple eye and pyramid representative of the Freemasons and illuminati; this house focuses on the sciences.

=== Supporting ===
- Adam Ellis (David Lewis), is the main mentor. Mr. Ellis is the CEO of Charles Ellis Industries and was kidnapped by Whittaker's men in the first episode. He leads the kids in the right direction to find why the candlestick is important and learn the truth about their connection to secret organizations.
- Order of Black:
  - Sarah Ellis (Kacey Rohl), Sarah is the college-age daughter of Adam Ellis. Sarah is also kidnapped, but she also has a secret agenda revealed in episode 3. She goes to an Ashcroft Academy.
  - Headmistress Kroger (Chelah Horsdal) in episodes 4–5, she is the headmistress of Ashcroft Academy, a university that Sarah Ellis is currently attending. She is the leader of the second group of bad guys.
  - Professor Wheeler (John Reardon) in episodes 4–5, he is the adviser of Sarah Ellis and he is also Sarah's trainer in the 2nd group of bad guys.
- Whittaker's group:
  - Mr. Whittaker (Gerald Plunkett), Whittaker is the former employer of Mr. Ellis and leader of the first group of bad guys. He wanted to double-cross the kids, but another person derailed his plans, so he had to re-work his plans in episode 4.
  - Jacob & Jonathan (Todd Mann & Brad Mann), They are the two goons of Mr. Whittaker.

=== Guest cast ===
- Principal Morgenstern (Barclay Hope) in episodes 1 & 5, a minor character who indirectly gives motivation for the kids to solve the mystery. He is the principal of Lakeside Prep and appears in the first episode when the kids call the police. He is disappointed in the group and states that his son (Lucas) will not have special treatment in the disciplinary board. He suspends all the kids (not Seamus, due to him not being in Lakeside Prep) and states that expulsion is on the table.
- Police Officer (Artane Brown) in episode 1, the major deterring factor and motivates the kids to solve the mystery. the cop tells the kids that the police can't find any criminal evidence of a crime, so they believe that it a hoax or prank. There are also a couple of police officers that sweep Room 33 and another police officer that is down in the lobby during the conversation with the kids and Principal Morgenstern.
- Front Desk Clerk (Christie Laing) in episode 1, a minor ally to the kids. She helps the kids get basic information about Mr. Nobody, Mr. Adam Ellis, to start the investigation.
- Old Woman (Brenda McDonald) in episode 3, she was the keeper of one of the wooden boxes that had parts to the Tesla Device. She gave the box to Dmitri and Agnes
- Grad Student (Scott Patey) in episode 3, he was able to give Dmitri and Agnes valuable information about Tesla in episode 3, which directed them to a demolished building then to the Old Woman's place.
- ER Doctor (Yee Jee Tso) in episode 3, he was shown assessing the X-Ray film that Lucas and Whitney brought in to the ER.
- Doorman (Hector Johnson) in episode 3, the doorman was seen in a skyscraper office building where Lucas and Whitney found the second box of parts.
- Claire (Brooke Goldner) in episode 4, she is the former roommate of Sarah Ellis who assists Liz and Whitney find information about Sarah
- Andrew (Richard Harmon) in episode 4, he was the mystery man that was following the Clue Crew. He gave dossier of information about the secret society at Ashcroft to the Crew.
- Richard (Aren Buchholz) in episode 4, he was the ex-boyfriend of Sarah Ellis. He tried to beat up Seamus, but was forced to back off. He is a "star" soccer player for Ashcroft.
- Student Guide (Samuel Patrick Chu) in episode 4, he took Dmitri on a tour of Ashcroft.

== Episodes ==
No.	Title	Directed by	Written by	Original release date
1	"Who Is Mr. Nobody?"	Terry McDonough	Raven Metzner	November 14, 2011
Six teenagers piece together clues after witnessing a probable murder at a charity event.
2	"Into the Secret Room"	Terry McDonough	Raven Metzner	November 14, 2011
The young detectives dig deeper into the case of the missing Mr. Nobody.
3	"A Question of Threes"	Terry McDonough	Raven Metzner	November 15, 2011
The young detectives try to solve a puzzle left behind by a scientist
4	"School for Conspiracy"	Terry McDonough	Raven Metzner	November 16, 2011
The young detectives search a boarding school for a suspect and find traces of a secret society.
5	"Enter the Order of Black"	Terry McDonough	Raven Metzner	November 17, 2011
The young detectives uncover their true adversaries and greater secrets are revealed.

== Production ==
On August 6, 2010, The Hub announced that an original half-hour program based on the board game, Clue would air as an original miniseries on the network. The miniseries was shot on Location in Vancouver, British Columbia, Canada under Hasbro Studios. On November 14, 2011, creator and executive producer Raven Metzner told Collider.com that he was hoping for an opportunity to create more mysteries for the characters, but could not say when, or if, there would be another season.

The series was re-cut as a two-hour TV film.

== Reception ==
The series premiere brought in 189,000 viewers. Brian Lowry of Variety said "Marketing-driven constructs are often the kiss of death creatively speaking, however, the commercial template surrounding Hub's miniseries based on "Clue"—consisting of five half-hour segments—is clever enough to overcome such concerns." Lowry continued, "In short, Hub is replicating some of the old razzle-dazzle of local kids' TV, for better or worse, around a production that ought to possess some multigenerational appeal."
