= Clue (musical) =

1997 musical

Clue The Musical
- Music: Galen Blum; Wayne Barker; Vinnie Martucci
- Lyrics: Tom Chiodo
- Book: Peter DePietro
- Basis: The board game Clue
- Productions: 1997 Off-Broadway

Clue The Musical is a musical with a book by Peter DePietro, music by Galen Blum, Wayne Barker and Vinnie Martucci, and lyrics by Tom Chiodo, based on the board game Clue. The plot concerns a murder at a mansion, occupied by several suspects, that is solved by a detective, while the ending is decided by the audience.

The script includes an interactive feature in which audience members randomly select cards that determine which suspect committed the murder, which weapon was used, and in what room the murder took place. Based on the cards drawn, the mystery has 216 possible endings, for which the script provides appropriate selections of dialogue to be delivered at the show's conclusion.

DePietro and Chiodo wrote the musical in 1993. Clue had previously been adapted for the screen as the 1985 black comedy film of the same name and was the basis of the British television game show Cluedo, which ran from 1990 to 1993.

After theatrical tryouts in Baltimore in 1995 and Chicago in 1996, the musical ran off-Broadway in 1997, receiving mostly unfavorable reviews. The musical's popularity has since grown in the form of numerous amateur theatre productions.

== Productions ==
The musical premiered at the New Boston Street Dinner Theatre in Baltimore, Maryland from June 1995 through August 1995, with Peter DePietro directing. The Baltimore Sun's review stated: "The creators of Clue, the Musical have...found a way to improve the game". It then ran at the Organic Theater in Chicago in April 1996, again directed by DePietro.

Clue opened Off-Broadway at the Players Theater on December 3, 1997, and closed after 29 performances and 17 previews. The production was again directed and choreographed by DePietro, and the cast featured Denny Dillon as the Detective, Robert Bartley as Mr. Boddy, Wysandria Woolsey as Mrs. Peacock, Ian Knauer as Professor Plum, Tiffany Taylor as Miss Scarlet, Michael Kostroff as Colonel Mustard, Daniel Leroy McDonald as Mrs. White, and Marc Rubman as Mr. Green. Reviews were mixed. The New York Times review asked:

[W]hy would you want to turn a board game into a musical? After all, the 1985 film version of Clue didn't exactly take the country by storm. ...There's very little plot to get involved in because the action has to fit every possible outcome. ...Nothing is really dreadful about Clue except the concept. ...The cast members are generally charming and have good voices, the choreography has moments of real humor, and the set is a pleasant cross between a three-dimensional game board and a freshly painted subway station".

The Times criticized the lyrics and dialogue, commenting that "numerous jokes fall flat. At one point, though, [the Detective] and Professor Plum have a very nice volley of literary quotes". The New York Daily News called it "excruciatingly unfunny" and quipped: "Inflicting such embarrassing material on a group of able-bodied actors and then supplying them with a variety of deadly weapons is a dangerous provocation. ...Making a musical from a board game is the kind of bizarre task that only a genius or a fool would undertake. And there is no sign of genius here. ...the songs are a dull pastiche of 1930s musicals".

== Plot ==
=== Act I ===
Mr. Boddy acts as host as he invites the audience to play "The Game" while introducing each of the other characters. He then brings three audience members onstage to choose one card each from one of three stacks, representing six suspects, six rooms, and six weapons. These selected cards, unseen by the selectors, cast, or the audience, are placed in an oversized envelope marked "Confidential", which is displayed on stage for the duration of the musical and opened to reveal the cards near the end. Mr. Boddy instructs the audience on how to play along. Between scenes throughout the musical, Mr. Boddy gives rhyming clues, which provide the audience with information they may jot down on a form supplied to them and use to solve the mystery.

In the kitchen, Mrs. White prepares dinner and argues with Mr. Boddy over her forced servitude to pay debts because he once helped her son. She laments "Life Is a Bowl of Pits". In the billiard room, Mr. Boddy's business partner, Mr. Green, clashes with him over missing funds. In the ballroom, Col. Mustard and Mrs. Peacock engage in an affair, but are caught by Mr. Boddy. Over drinks in the lounge, Miss Scarlet and Mr. Green are revealed to have been business partners of Mr. Boddy's and former lovers, and that Mr. Boddy double-crossed them both and unceremoniously dumped Miss Scarlet. They muse revenge and that "Everyday Devices" such as a wrench and lead pipe are dangerous when used for the wrong reasons. In the study, Prof. Plum recounts how Mr. Boddy ruined his family fortune to Mrs. White while she tries to unsuccessfully flirt with him. In the conservatory, Mrs. Peacock plans to add Mr. Boddy to her growing list of dead husbands ("Once a Widow").

After dinner, Mr. Boddy invites his guests and staff to fulfill their destiny — murdering him. They search through "Corridor and Halls" for the right combination of suspect, room and weapon. Mr. Boddy is soon found dead ("The Murder"), the cause of which is unknown ("After the Murder").

=== Act II ===
Mr. Boddy miraculously revives to introduce a new character, a hard-nosed, attractive Detective. As she searches the mansion for clues, the suspects nervously speculate "She Hasn't Got a Clue".

She returns with six possible weapons – a wrench, candlestick, lead pipe, knife, revolver and rope – found in six rooms: the lounge, kitchen, ballroom, conservatory, billiard room, and study. All of these have the suspects' fingerprints on them, which were made between 9:00 PM and midnight, the latter of which is the time of Boddy's murder. After the suspects tell her how they used the "Everyday Devices", the Detective questions Prof. Plum, who tries to seduce her ("Seduction Deduction"). After his attempts fail, she in turn interrogates Col Mustard, Mr. Green, Miss Scarlet, Mrs. Peacock, and Mrs. White, as each speculates that she is a "Foul-Weather Friend".

As the Detective prepares to make her accusation, the Suspects cry "Don't Blame Me" and panic at "The Final Clue". She reveals the random killer, location, and weapon as per the three cards drawn earlier, and the killer confesses. Then, it is revealed that the previously stated murderer was only an accomplice, and that the true murderer is Professor Plum. He is then revealed to be a disguised "dorky school teacher", as the true Plum is disguised as a piano player in the orchestra.

The suspects ponder life beyond the mansion, but are compelled by Mr. Boddy to repeat their fate and continue playing "The Game".

== Characters ==
- Mr. Boddy – the charismatic host of the game, husband of Mrs. Peacock, and victim of the murder.
- Detective – the clumsy detective who arrives to solve the mystery.
- Colonel Mustard – he fancies himself a triumphant war colonel and is having an affair with Mrs. Peacock. He is implicated in the death of Mr. Boddy's parents and was married to Mr. Boddy's mother after the death of her husband.
- Mr. Green – a con artist and entrepreneur, he is a former lover of Miss Scarlet's and business partner of Mr. Boddy.
- Mrs. Peacock – a black widow, socialite, and chair of Peacock Enterprises married to Mr. Boddy and cheating with Col. Mustard. She is suspected in the murder of five previous husbands.
- Professor Plum – a super genius and author who is actually a disguised "dorky school teacher" whose family fortune was ruined by Mr. Boddy.
- Miss Scarlet – a former Las Vegas lounge performer and former lover of Mr. Green.
- Mrs. White – a fun-loving chief domestic of Boddy Manor, played by a man in the tradition of English pantomime and music hall in some productions and a woman in other.
- Piano Player – the murderer.

== Music ==
Act I

- "Overture" – Orchestra
- "The Game" – Mr. Boddy and Suspects
- "Life is a Bowl of Pits" – Mrs. White
- "Everyday Devices" – Mr. Green, Miss Scarlet, and Suspects
- "Once a Widow" – Mrs. Peacock
- "Corridors and Halls" – Mr. Boddy and Suspects
- "The Murder" – Mr. Boddy and Suspects
- "After the Murder ("The Game" Reprise; "Act I Finale") – Suspects

Act II

- "She Hasn't Got a Clue" – Suspects
- "Everyday Devices" (Reprise) – Suspects
- "Seduction Deduction" – Prof. Plum and the Detective
- "Foul-Weather Friend" – Suspects
- "Don't Blame Me" – Company
- "The Final Clue" – Mr. Boddy and Suspects
- "The Game" (Finale) – Mr. Boddy and Suspects
- "She Hasn't Got a Clue" (Reprise)/"Bows" – Company

== Differences from the board game ==
The role of Mr. Boddy is expanded, and much of the action centers on motive rather than exclusively who, how, and where the murder happened. A new character, the Detective, drives much of the action in the second half of the show. In one variation of the stage musical, the Library and Hall are not rooms in Boddy Manor.
