= Clue Chronicles: Fatal Illusion =

2000 video game

- The EU version cover of Cluedo Chronicles
- Developer: EAI Interactive
- Publisher: Hasbro Interactive
- Producers: Virginia Ellen McArthur; Shari Scigliano
- Designer: Matthew J. Costello
- Artist: Matt Von Brock
- Writer: Matthew J. Costello
- Composer: George Alistair Sanger
- Series: Cluedo
- Platform: Windows
- Release: US: January 31, 2000
- Genre: Adventure
- Mode: Single-player

Clue Chronicles: Fatal Illusion (subtitled Mystery Series: Episode One, titled Cluedo Chronicles: Fatal Illusion outside of North America, and alternatively known as Clue Chronicles Episode 1: The Fatal Masque) is a Windows point-and-click adventure game based on the Cluedo franchise, known as Clue in North America. It is a reinterpretation and adaption of the Clue board game as an adventure game including many of the original characters. The game was distributed with a variety of covers, each featuring a different murder weapon.

== Development ==
Two Clue video games were released during the 1990s: Clue, for SNES and Sega Genesis, and Clue: Murder at Boddy Mansion for PC. Clue was "riding a new wave of popularity", and Fatal Illusion was intended to be the first installment of a series of three Clue Chronicles mysteries. However, the series was cancelled when "Hasbro folded and EAI quit the gaming business".

Unlike its predecessors, Clue Chronicles "leaves the board game 'feel' behind and transforms into a murder mystery adventure game". The Boston Herald called it a "grown-up" twist on the franchise's familiar theme. Care was taken in rendering the location backgrounds, "even down to the moving reflections in the shiny hallway floor of the mansion". The game promised "new and soon-to-be-memorable characters", inspiring anticipation that it would expand beyond the original board game. Although the game's voice-over is only available in English, its text was translated into Castilian Spanish. All versions contain three game discs, and a patch was later released to fix its many bugs.

Designer Matthew J. Costello said that he "didn't really become a game designer ... as much as a writer" as he worked on the Clue Chronicles series. Its music was composed by George Alistair Sanger.

A Boston Herald reviewer called the game "difficult" and "frustrating", but said that help is available on the Web. According to the Arlington Heights, Illinois Daily Herald, it "has an online hint system".

== Gameplay ==
Clue Chronicles: Fatal Illusion is a first-person, 3D-perspective, point-and-click adventure game with gameplay typical of the genre, totaling about 20 hours. It "plays like a traditional CD-ROM adventure game with a mystery theme". The game is controlled with a mouse, with its pointer changing when the player can perform an action, grab an object or walk around. Selecting a character calls up a notebook with a list of questions to ask. They are checked off and new topics appear as the conversation progresses. The main menu accesses suspect biographies and game options, saving and loading. Inventory can be manipulated (or inspected) at the bottom of the screen, and a clue option gives novice players hints. Puzzles include riddles and abstract challenges to obtain gems, a maze, and limited inventory-based puzzles. The game requires the player to interview suspects to gain insight into solving puzzles, which reveal vital objects or clues.

== Plot ==
The game is set on New Year's Eve 1938, when the player is invited aboard the Rhine Maiden yacht for a trip to the mountaintop retreat of eccentric and mysterious German millionaire Ian Masque to see his collection of Egyptian artifacts. Masque meets his fate from a poisoned puzzle box, and the player is tasked with finding the murderer. The game's plot includes an Egyptian curse and Nazi spy rings.

The storyline plays out in four acts in three settings (in a castle, aboard the Rhine Maiden and on a cable car). New characters join the original cast of six characters. The game has a cliffhanger ending, which led players to expect a sequel.

== Critical reception ==
The German magazine PC Player gave Clue Chronicles: Fatal Illusion a score of 62 out of 100, praising the reproduction of the "enjoyable short conversations" in the "excellent" German-language edition. According to the review, its puzzles were "varied" and relatively easy; if the player is not an "amateur detective", they could "reject this case". The magazine criticized "the imprecise mouse control, the lengthy walks, as well as the homespun presentation". Computer Games Magazine gave the game a score of 60 out of 100, calling it "average", "[not] particularly enjoyable" but "not painful to play". Metzomagic gave the game 2.5 stars out of 5, calling it "quite an enjoyable little mystery" with entertaining puzzles but criticizing the game's graphical glitches and bugs, shortness and "failure to capitalise on all the potential". Tap-Repeatedly found Fatal Illusion's backgrounds and locations "richly detailed" and the puzzles "logical and fun", but the interface was "cumbersome", the music "repetitive" and the voice acting like it was read "from a script into a microphone in the conference room". Giving the game a score of 80 out of 100, the website concluded: "Overall, despite its many flaws, Clue Chronicles: Fatal Illusion was a fun game to play, if too short". Game Power rated it two out of four, noting that the game played as if the creators used Adventure Games For Dummies as a template. The Russian website NQuest gave it a score of 74 out of 100: "With good graphics and a good detective story the game has the best traditions of the genre: the murder, collecting evidence, and questioning suspects". Blogger Do. Lloret de Mar was ambivalent to the game's 3D graphics, animations, music and special effects, noting its "interesting puzzles" and shortness. According to the Cluedo fansite Cluedofan, it was "packed with puzzles" and a "beautifully designed adventure game" with "animated 3D characters" and "fantastic cut scenes". The French website 01Net said that the adaptation of the Cluedo board game was "much more successful" than Hasbro's "first failed attempt"; another French website, Pabbajita, called it a "very conventional game". GameFreaks liked the game's concept, but not its execution. Adventure Point gave Clue Chronicles: Fatal Illusion 3.5 stars, calling it "a surprisingly enjoyable, if short, detective game with some decent puzzles". According to the Boston Herald, the "visually rewarding" game had "glossy animation" and "detailed, sepia-toned interiors" but its compelling characters "move ... rather like puppets". The Herald later recommended the game in "Games fit everyone's gift list", calling it "convoluted" and perfect for "mystery lovers".

Bob Mandel of the Adrenaline Vault described the game as a "mystery novel with tons of unexpected twists and turns", calling it "a noble and clever expansion" which "involves much more penetrating, complex, and, ultimately, riveting detective work". Jenny Guenther of Just Adventure wrote that the board-game adaption exceeded expectations; the story was "surprisingly tightly plotted", and she graded the "logical", "fun" and "short" game a C. The Hungarian review site PlayDome praised the game's surroundings, lack of simple solutions and general excitement. However, the Dutch review site Adventure Island felt that the game had drifted from the Cluedo brand. Quandary gave Clue Chronicles: Fatal Illusion a mixed review, praising its playability while noting its shortcomings and calling the game a "short diversionary trip for mystery fans". GameSpot was disappointed by the wasted opportunity for the board game to be adapted into a "fun, engaging computer adventure", with "low production values and unimaginative design". GameSpot UK game the game a rating of 4.3 out of 10, and Computer Gaming Magazine rated it three out of five. Gateway deemed it a "charming diversion". Pelit called it a mediocre example of the adventure video-game genre, giving it a score of 76 out of 100. The Daily Herald called the game a "clunky mystery", noting that it stood out from other mystery titles aimed at younger players by showing dead bodies: "[It] has a fine opening, the music is first rate ... and it keeps you interested in spite of its copious limitations" such as loading at a "geologic" pace, its many bugs and a sub-par instruction manual. Suggesting that the game should have been kept under wraps for a few more months of developmental fine-tuning, the reviewer concluded that "mystery fans may be able to forgive its stilted clunkiness, but let's hope that Episode II is a lot better". The magazine PC Direct criticised the "sluggish" gameplay, but praised an "excellent" characterisation and "lavish" 3D graphics.

== The Inn at Death's Door ==
The Inn at Death's Door was a four-part, free online mystery prequel to Fatal Illusion. The text-based detective mystery mini-series' chapter titles were "Episode One: The Magic Box"; "Episode Two: Chasing the Fox"; "Episode Three: One Death Less, One Death More", and "Episode Four: Race for the Truth". Its premise was "an assortment of eccentric guests gather[ing] at a Swiss inn", wherein a series of mysteries take place. Mystery website Mysterynet.com held a Clue Chronicles Mystery Weekend Contest from November 22 to December 3, 1999, sponsored by site owner Newfront Productions. The contest asked participants to read the four-part story, correctly answer four questions related to the mystery on the online entry form and explain how they solved the case in 500 words or less. The judges, Newfront and MysteryNet staff, selected a winner on January 15, 2000. The prize was a Murder Mystery Weekend for Two at the Austin Hill Inn in West Dover, Vermont. A judges' note accompanied the winning entry:

Nearly 1,000 viewers submitted their own solutions to "The Inn at Death's Door". Reading through them was a treat. One of my favorites, from a viewpoint of pure imagination, was Janis Ebrecht's solution involving Hitler and the Duke of Windsor. William Drennan also provided a highly rated entry, the only correct solution to conclude with the patented "Clue" ending (killer, room, weapon). The winner was finally chosen on the basis of accuracy, sticking to the clues as provided, composition and style. Bonus points were given for staying within the 500-word limit. Congratulations to Elizabeth Dupke of Kent, Washington. Her final chapter, reprinted below, has been edited slightly.
