= Clue (film) =

1985 film by Jonathan Lynn

- Theatrical release poster
- Directed by: Jonathan Lynn
- Screenplay by: Jonathan Lynn
- Story by: John Landis; Jonathan Lynn
- Based on: Cluedo by Anthony E. Pratt
- Produced by: Debra Hill
- Starring: Eileen Brennan; Tim Curry; Madeline Kahn; Christopher Lloyd; Michael McKean; Martin Mull; Lesley Ann Warren
- Cinematography: Victor J. Kemper
- Edited by: David Bretherton; Richard Haines
- Music by: John Morris
- Production companies: Guber-Peters Company; PolyGram Pictures; Debra Hill Productions
- Distributed by: Paramount Pictures
- Release date: December 13, 1985
- Running time: 86–96 minutes (Note: Runtime varies based on the version of the film: 87 minutes with ending A or B; 86 minutes with ending C; 96 minutes with all three endings.)
- Country: United States
- Language: English
- Budget: $15 million
- Box office: $14.6 million

Clue is a 1985 American comedy mystery film directed and written by Jonathan Lynn, who developed the story with John Landis. Based on the board game Cluedo (also known as Clue), the film stars Eileen Brennan, Tim Curry, Madeline Kahn, Christopher Lloyd, Michael McKean, Martin Mull, and Lesley Ann Warren. Set in 1954, the plot follows six strangers who gather at a secluded mansion where a series of murders unfold, forcing the group to determine the identity of the killer among them.

Released on December 13, 1985, Clue featured an unusual theatrical presentation, with each screening depicting one of three different endings, revealing an alternative solution to the plot's mystery. Clue received mixed reviews from critics and grossed $14.6 million against a $15 million budget. Over time, the film developed a cult following and an improved critical reception based on the ensemble cast performances. This bolstered reputation inspired the live adaptation Clue: On Stage as well as anniversary theatrical re-releases.

== Plot ==
In 1954, six strangers are invited to a secluded New England mansion. They are greeted by the butler Wadsworth and the maid Yvette. Each is assigned a pseudonym to maintain confidentiality: "Colonel Mustard", "Mrs. White", "Mrs. Peacock", "Mr. Green", "Professor Plum", and "Miss Scarlet". During dinner, they discover that they all have ties to the United States government, and are joined by a seventh guest, Mr. Boddy.

Wadsworth reveals that Boddy is responsible for blackmailing each guest by threatening to expose their un-American activities, such as murder, corruption, adultery, and homosexuality, and tells the guests that the police will soon arrive to arrest Boddy. Boddy proposes that the guests kill Wadsworth to avoid their secrets being revealed, and presents each with a weapon—a candlestick, rope, lead pipe, wrench, revolver, and dagger—before turning out the lights. After a gunshot rings out, Boddy is found apparently dead. Wadsworth confesses that Boddy had also blackmailed him over his wife's association with socialists. After she took her own life, he assembled the guests to convince them to testify against Boddy.

Suspecting the cook killed Boddy, the guests search for her and find her stabbed to death in the kitchen. Returning to the study, they discover Boddy is missing and conclude he is still alive, only to find him bludgeoned to death with the candlestick in the hallway. Wadsworth locks the weapons in a cupboard, but before he can dispose of the key, a stranded motorist arrives.

The group splits into pairs to search the mansion, but someone burns the blackmail evidence, unlocks the cupboard, and kills the motorist. Mustard and Scarlet discover a secret passage leading to the lounge, where they find the motorist's body. Their cries for help prompt Yvette to free them by shooting the locked door with the revolver. The group deduces that the murderer pickpocketed the cupboard key from Wadsworth.

A police officer investigating the motorist's abandoned car arrives to make a telephone call. After successfully distracting the officer and concealing the bodies, the group resumes its search, but someone cuts the electricity. In the darkness, Yvette, the officer, and an arriving singing telegram girl are murdered.

After restoring the power, Wadsworth gathers the guests and reconstructs the night's events, explaining that the victims were informants connected to each guest. Three endings are then presented.

In the first, Yvette is revealed to have murdered the cook and Boddy on Scarlet's behalf, while Scarlet killed the remaining victims, intending to replace Boddy as the group's blackmailer. In the second ending, Peacock is revealed to have committed all the murders to protect her secrets. In both endings, the police arrive to arrest the perpetrator, and Wadsworth is exposed as an undercover FBI agent.

The third ending reveals the truth: Peacock stabbed the cook (her former employee), Plum bludgeoned Boddy, Mustard killed the motorist (his former driver), White strangled Yvette (who had sex with her husband), Scarlet murdered the police officer (whom she was bribing), and Wadsworth shot the singing telegram girl (with whom Plum had an affair). Wadsworth then reveals that he is the real Boddy and that the man killed earlier was his butler. He orchestrated the murders to eliminate his informants and evidence of his crimes, but intends to continue blackmailing the guests. However, Green draws his own revolver and kills Wadsworth, revealing himself to be an undercover FBI agent. The police arrive and arrest the guests, while Green, who was believed to be homosexual, announces that he is going home to sleep with his wife.

== Cast ==
Miss Scarlet (Lesley Ann Warren), Colonel Mustard (Martin Mull), Mrs. White (Madeline Kahn), Mr. Green (Michael McKean), Wadsworth (Tim Curry), Professor Plum (Christopher Lloyd), and Mrs. Peacock (Eileen Brennan)

- Eileen Brennan as Mrs. Peacock, the wife of a U.S. senator who has been accepting bribes from foreign powers
- Tim Curry as Wadsworth, a butler forced to work for Mr. Boddy
- Madeline Kahn as Mrs. White, the widow of a nuclear physicist and four previous men, all of whom died under suspicious circumstances
- Christopher Lloyd as Professor Plum, a disgraced former psychiatrist who now works for the World Health Organization after losing his medical license for having an affair with one of his patients
- Michael McKean as Mr. Green, a closeted homosexual State Department employee
- Martin Mull as Colonel Mustard, an army officer guilty of war profiteering during World War II who later became involved in a top secret fusion bomb project.
- Lesley Ann Warren as Miss Scarlet, a sassy Washington, D.C. madam who runs an underground brothel.
- Colleen Camp as Yvette, a voluptuous young French maid who formerly worked as a call girl for Miss Scarlet, during which she had Colonel Mustard as a client and pursued an affair with one of Mrs. White's late husbands.
- Lee Ving as Mr. Boddy, a man who has been blackmailing the six guests.
- Bill Henderson as The Cop, a police officer whom Miss Scarlet had been bribing.
- Jane Wiedlin as The Singing Telegram Girl, a former patient of Professor Plum, with whom she had an affair.
- Jeffrey Kramer as The Motorist, Colonel Mustard's driver during World War II
- Kellye Nakahara as The Cook, Mr. Boddy's cook who used to work for Mrs. Peacock.

Additionally, Howard Hesseman makes an uncredited appearance as the Chief of Police.

== Production ==
=== Development ===
Producer Debra Hill initially acquired the rights to adapt the game Clue from Parker Brothers and intended to distribute through Universal Pictures. As early as 1981, Hill mentioned plans to adapt the game into a movie, with P. D. James reported to be writing the screenplay with multiple endings.

=== Screenplay ===
John Landis, who had initially been set to direct, would go onto to work with Jonathan Lynn on the story for the film. Landis is credited for coming up with the multiple endings for the film. Playwright Tom Stoppard was initially approached to write the screenplay and worked on it for a year before giving up and returning all of the money he had already been paid. Landis then asked writer and composer Stephen Sondheim and actor Anthony Perkins to write the screenplay, both of whom asked for too much money. The script was ultimately finished by Lynn, who was invited to direct as a result.

Scrapped fourth ending

A fourth ending was written for the film; according to Lynn, "It really wasn't very good. I looked at it, and I thought, 'No, no, no, we've got to get rid of that.'" In it, Wadsworth committed all the murders and reveals he poisoned the champagne, leaving no witnesses when the six guests soon die. The police officers arrive and capture Wadsworth, but he breaks free and steals a police car only to be ultimately thwarted when three police dogs lunge from the back seat. Tim Curry suggested the ending was never released due to the reveal being considered "too obvious."

=== Casting ===
Carrie Fisher was originally cast to portray Miss Scarlet but withdrew to enter treatment for drug and alcohol addiction; she was replaced with Lesley Ann Warren, who was originally cast to play Mrs. White, who was then played by Madeline Kahn. Jonathan Lynn's first choice for Wadsworth was Leonard Rossiter but he died before filming commenced. The second choice was Rowan Atkinson but it was decided that he was not sufficiently well known at the time, so Tim Curry was cast. The entire cast received the same salary and billing, despite their different levels of notability at the time.

=== Filming ===
Clue was filmed on sound stages 17 and 18 at the Paramount Pictures film studios in Hollywood. The set design is credited to Les Gobruegge, Gene Nollmanwas, and William B. Majorand, with set decoration by Thomas L. Roysden. To decorate the interior sets, authentic 18th- and 19th-century furnishings were rented from private collectors, including the estate of Theodore Roosevelt. After completion, the set was bought by the producers of Dynasty, who used it as the fictional Carlton Hotel.

All interior scenes were filmed at the Paramount lot, except the ballroom scene. The ballroom and two driveway exteriors, including the front gate and retaining wall, were filmed on location at a mansion in South Pasadena, California. The driveway and fountain were recreated on the Paramount lot and used for most shots, including the guests' arrivals. Exterior shots of the South Pasadena mansion were enhanced with matte paintings to make the house appear much larger; these were executed by matte artist Syd Dutton in consultation with Albert Whitlock. The mansion was destroyed in a fire on October 5, 2005 but has since been rebuilt. The original front gate and retaining wall as seen in the movie were preserved and still stand alongside the new house.

Jonathan Lynn screened His Girl Friday for the cast as inspiration for how to deliver their lines. Madeline Kahn improvised her monologue about "flames".

== Release ==
The film was released theatrically on December 13, 1985. Each theater received one of the three endings, and some theaters announced which ending the viewer would see.

To mark the film's 40th anniversary, a three-day theatrical exhibition in August 2025 screened a different ending each day.

=== Novelizations ===
The novelization based on the screenplay is by Michael McDowell. Landis, Lynn and Ann Matthews wrote the youth adaptation Clue: The Storybook. Both adaptations were published in 1985, and feature a fourth ending cut from the film: in a variation on the-butler-did-it trope, Wadsworth explains how he killed Boddy and the other victims, then reveals to the guests that they've all been poisoned, leaving no witnesses to his perfect crime. As Wadsworth proceeds to disable the phones, the police chief (having previously posed as an evangelist) returns with a squad of officers who disarm Wadsworth. He nonetheless manages to escape and attempts to get away in a police car, only to crash after Dobermanns attack from the back seat.

=== Home media ===
The film was released to home video for both VHS and Betamax videocassette formats in the United States and Canada on August 20, 1986, and to other countries on February 11, 1991. It was released on DVD by Paramount Home Entertainment on June 17, 2000, and on Blu-ray by Paramount Home Media Distribution on August 7, 2012. Shout! Factory released a 4K UHD Blu-ray collector's edition of Clue on December 12, 2023, including new interviews with director Jonathan Lynn and production manager Jeffrey Chernov.

Home video, television broadcast and digital streaming releases include all three endings shown sequentially, with two characterized as possible endings and the third being the accurate account. DVD and Blu-ray versions offer viewers the option to watch a single ending (chosen randomly) or the "home entertainment version" with all three endings stitched together.

=== Soundtrack ===
La-La Land Records released the John Morris score as a limited-edition CD soundtrack in February 2011. For the film's 30th anniversary in 2015, Mondo issued a limited-edition 180-gram vinyl pressed on six different character-themed color variants. A vinyl reissue from Enjoy The Ride Records followed in 2022.

== Reception ==
=== Critical response ===
The film initially received mixed reviews. Janet Maslin of The New York Times panned it, writing that the beginning "is the only part of the film that is remotely engaging. After that, it begins to drag". Similarly, Gene Siskel of the Chicago Tribune gave the film 2.5 out of 4 stars, writing, "Clue offers a few big laughs early on followed by a lot of characters running around on a treadmill to nowhere." Siskel particularly criticized the decision to release the film to theaters with three separate endings, calling it a "gimmick" that would distract audiences from the rest of the film, and concluding, "Clue is a movie that needs three different middles rather than three different endings."

Roger Ebert of the Chicago Sun-Times gave the film 2 out of 4 stars, writing that it has a "promising" cast but the "screenplay is so very, very thin that [the actors] spend most of their time looking frustrated, as if they'd just been cut off right before they were about to say something interesting". On Siskel & Ebert & the Movies, both agreed that the "A" ending was the best while the "C" ending was the worst.

On the review aggregator website Rotten Tomatoes, the film holds an approval rating of 73% based on 40 reviews, with an average rating of 6.4/10. The website's critics consensus reads, "A robust ensemble of game actors elevate Clue above its schematic source material, but this farce's reliance on novelty over organic wit makes its entertainment value a roll of the dice." On Metacritic, the film has a weighted average score of 41 out of 100 based on 17 critics, indicating "mixed or average" reviews.

=== Box office ===
Clue has grossed $14.6 million in North America, just short of its $15 million budget.

== Remake ==
Previous plans for a remake or reboot have languished for years. Initially Gore Verbinski was developing a new Clue film in 2009, which was dropped by Universal Studios in 2011. Hasbro Studios moved the project to 20th Century Fox by August 2016, envisioned as a "worldwide mystery" with action-adventure elements, potentially establishing a franchise with international appeal. Ryan Reynolds optioned a three-year first-look deal in January 2018, planning to star in the remake with a script by Rhett Reese and Paul Wernick. Jason Bateman was briefly attached to the film in September 2019, followed by James Bobin attached as director in February 2020, with Oren Uziel hired to rewrite the script in August 2022. Hasbro Entertainment sought new rights arrangements for Clue in 2024, and established deals with TriStar Pictures and Sony Pictures Television for new screen adaptations of the board game. Screenwriter Shay Hatten has been in talks for the new film script.

== Stage adaptations ==
The screenplay was adapted from film to stage in 2017 by the original screenwriter Jonathan Lynn. Clue: On Stage premiered in 2017 at Bucks County Playhouse, adapted by Hunter Foster with additional material by Eric Price. It was directed by Foster and starred Sally Struthers and Erin Dilly. A revised adaptation by Sandy Rustin, incorporating material from Foster and Price, was first performed in 2020. Rustin's adaptation was described as "a welcome throwback to an era of physical comedy". The stage adaptations have been performed widely.

A national tour of the mystery-comedy play launched in 2024, directed by Casey Hushion.

== In other media ==
The 2013 Psych season 7 episode "100 Clues" features Clue stars Martin Mull, Christopher Lloyd and Lesley Ann Warren as suspects in a series of murders at a mansion. The episode, in addition to many jokes and themes in homage to the film, includes multiple endings in which the audience (separately for East and West Coast viewership) decides who is the real killer. The episode was dedicated to the memory of Madeline Kahn.

Warren guest starred on "Charlie's Angel", a 2019 episode of Mull's sitcom The Cool Kids as Kathleen, a love interest for his character Charlie. Her role announcement in November 2018 was initially touted by the press as a Clue reunion, though only Mull and Warren appear. The two also appeared in episodes of Community as the parents of character Britta Perry.

== Bibliography ==
- Matthews, Ann; Landis, John; Lynn, Jonathan (1985). Paramount Pictures Presents Clue: The Storybook. New York: Little Simon. ISBN 978-0-6716-1867-4. Archived from the original on February 15, 2017.
