= Clue (1992 video game) =

- Super NES cover art.
- Developer: Sculptured Software
- Publisher: Parker Brothers
- Platforms: Sega Genesis; SNES
- Release: SNES: NA: July 1992; Genesis: NA: January 1993
- Genres: Strategy; Board game
- Modes: Single-player, multiplayer

Clue: Parker Brothers' Classic Detective Game is a North American-exclusive video game published for the Super Nintendo Entertainment System and Sega Genesis video game consoles. It is based on the popular board game of the same name.

The game was shown for preview at the Summer CES in May 1992 with plans of distribution for that fall at a MSRP US$49.99.

== Gameplay ==
Up to six people can play, using any controller. The object, as in the board game, is to determine who murdered Mr. Boddy, where the crime took place, and which weapon was used.

Each player is dealt a number of cards. Each card eliminates a suspect, weapon, or room. Each player can view their own cards during their turn. A die is rolled, and the six players (represented by the six suspects Miss Scarlet, Col. Mustard, Mrs. White, Mr. Green, Mrs. Peacock, and Prof. Plum) move around the board. Upon entering one of the nine rooms on the board, the player must make a suggestion, choosing a suspect and a weapon (the room the player is in is automatically chosen). The suspect is summoned to that room, a vignette is shown, showing who or what was in that room, or who held the weapon. This would result in a clue given, such as "Miss Scarlet was in the Lounge" or "No one had the wrench". On the highest difficulty, the clues given are less broad, like in the board game, with clues only given that the chosen suspect or weapon was or wasn't in the room.

A player can, on their turn, make an interrogation, wherein they can choose a suspect, a weapon, and a room. A longer vignette is shown, playing out the scenario as the player chose; for example, if Miss Scarlet is in the lounge with the lead pipe, the vignette goes: "The lounge was warm. It was cozy enough for a nap... A long nap. Miss Scarlet laughed as she fixed her hair. She picked up the pipe". At this point, one of the other players, if they are in possession of a card that eliminates any of those factors, shows on screen that they have proof that the scenario could not have happened. If none of the other players are in possession of such a card, the interrogating player is not proved wrong. Players may make two interrogations per game.

A player can, on their turn, make an accusation, which plays out similar to an interrogation, unless if the player is incorrect, they are eliminated from the game. If they are correct, the actual suspect is seen killing Mr. Boddy in addition to the vignette and is then seen being arrested. The accusing player is the winner.
