= Clue VCR Mystery Game =

1985 VCR murder mystery game

- Genres: Murder mystery
- Players: 10

Clue VCR Mystery Game is a 1985 murder mystery VCR game based on the board game Clue, known as Cluedo in the UK.

== Gameplay ==
The game uses a 60-minute videotape of live-action scenes divided into three chapters, with 18 individual games, three sets of clue cards, 18 investigation cards, and ten suspect cards. The four new suspects Monsieur Brunette, Madam Rose, Sgt. Gray, and Miss Peach would later appear in the 1988 board game Clue Master Detective.

== Plot ==
At Boddy Mansion during a thunderstorm, Miss White serves drinks to Miss Scarlett, Colonel Mustard, Mrs. Peacock, Mr. Green, Professor Plum. As Mrs. White checks on the roast, Miss Scarlett talks to the other guests how Madam Rose invited them back to Mr. Boddy's mansion following Mr. Boddy's murder as the police haven't found out who killed him. Madam Rose then appears stating that she plans to hold a seancé to speak to Mr. Boddy's ghost in order to find out who killed him. Then enters the lawyer Monsieur Brunette who talks about the irregularity in Mr. Boddy's will. Miss Peach then enters stating that she got lost and needs to use the telephone as her car broke down on the bridge. When Mr. Green asks if they will be able to leave tonight, Sgt. Gray comes in stating that river is flooded and the bridge is washed out.

The butler Didit then introduces himself to the players while telling them that 1 to 5 murders will be committed in Boddy Mansion and it is up to the players to solve it. With 10 suspects in the mansion, some will be murderers and some will be victims. For those that don't know how to play Clue, Didit provides an introductory to it.

== Sequel ==
The sequel Clue II: Murder In Disguise VCR Game was released in 1987 with the principal cast reprising their roles.

== Critical reception and legacy ==
The German localisation was cited by as a potential learning supplement for students.

In a 21st century retrospective, Clue VCR Mystery Game was recognized as "a new way to play a familiar game [that] also ushered in a new type of gaming altogether".

The 2013 documentary Who Did It? The Clue VCR Game was directed by Tim Labonte and Frank Durant.
