= Cluedo: Discover the Secrets =

Board game

- Publishers: Parker Brothers
- Publication: 2008; 18 years ago
- Genres: Board game
- Players: 3 to 6
- Setup time: 5 min
- Playing time: 60-90 min
- Chance: Moderate-Low
- Skills: Deductive reasoning Strategy

Cluedo: Discover the Secrets (released in North America as Clue: Discover the Secrets) is a 2008 board game designed by Hasbro to modernize the world-famous game Cluedo. Though the game's main title is still simply "Cluedo" or "Clue", many retailers list the game with a "Reinvention" suffix, to distinguish it from the original game. The game was created to update what Hasbro considered to be an old-fashioned game, and it became available in October 2008. However, the traditional version of the game remained on sale as well.

As of 2014, Hasbro no longer sells the game via its website, but they do continue to sell a version of it as part of their Grab & Go travel series.

== Changes ==
Several modifications and updates have been made to the original game's equipment and rules.

=== Suspects ===
The six suspects from the original crime have been updated to include first names and more modern-day lifestyles. Each character has a special ability or "power" that can be used once during a game.

- Miss Scarlett becomes Kasandra Scarlet, a famous actress often featured in tabloids.
- Colonel Mustard becomes Jack Mustard, a former football player.
- Mrs. White becomes Diane White, an ex-child star seeking the spotlight.
- Reverend Green becomes Jacob Green, a go-to guy "with all the ins".
- Mrs. Peacock becomes Eleanor Peacock, a manners freak from a political family.
- Professor Plum becomes Victor Plum, a billionaire video game designer.

=== Weapons ===
The lead pipe and spanner/wrench have all been dropped from the original list of possible weapons used and replaced with the baseball bat and dumbbell. Likewise, the knife and pistol officially replace the dagger and the revolver, respectively. In addition, an axe, trophy, and poison have been added, bringing the total number of murder weapons up to nine as follows:

- Rope (orig., used in many editions)
- Candlestick (orig., used in many editions)
- Knife (orig., replaces Dagger in US ed.)
- Pistol (orig., replaces Revolver)
- Bat (new, replaces Lead pipe)
- Dumbbell (new, replaces Spanner/Wrench)
- Trophy (new, once in some spin-off editions)
- Poison (new, used in some previous spin-off editions and included with the 50th Anniversary ed.)
- Axe (new, used in some previous spin-off editions)

The axe and poison were included in the very first version of Cluedo developed by Anthony Pratt and his wife in 1944, during World War II in Birmingham, England. In the original version, there were nine weapons that included both the axe and the poison. It even featured extra characters such as Mr. Silver and Mr. Black. However, when Pratt's patent expired, he sold all the rights to his game for around $14,000(USD) in the early 60s. It was at this time that the version was altered by shortening the number of characters and weapons to only six of each instead of nine. This was done to reduce game play time for those who believed that each round of Pratt's version took too long to complete. In spite of the alterations, some variations of the original version survived and are still available in select locations throughout the world to this day.

=== Rooms ===
The nine standard rooms on the board have been changed as indicated by an asterisk (with the original room name in parentheses). In addition to these changes, the center room, Swimming Pool (the "cellar" in the original game), is now a playable, accessible room in the game, to be entered by the player before making the final accusation. The starting spaces for Scarlet and Mustard have also moved clockwise by three positions. Secret passages still connect the rooms of opposite corners of the gameboard.

Kitchen	Patio* (Ballroom)	Spa* (Conservatory)
Dining Room	Pool* (Cellar)	Theatre* (Billiard Room)
Dining Room	Pool* (Cellar)	Living Room* (Library)
Guest House* (Lounge)	Hall	Observatory* (Study)

=== Rules ===
While the game generally follows the classic rules, there are several additions to the game. A new deck of cards has been added to the game: the Intrigue cards. This deck consists of two types of cards: Keepers and Clocks. Keepers give the drawer special abilities, such as the ability to look at another player's cards; however, these cards do not override the original rules. Of the eight Clocks, the first seven that are drawn do nothing. The player who draws the eighth Clock is "killed" by the murderer, and is out of the game. Intrigue cards are linked to new "?" spaces on the board, which require one to be drawn when landed upon.

The player must move to the indoor swimming pool in the center of the board to make an accusation. This adds some challenge versus the ability to make accusations from anywhere in the original game.

== Reception ==
Kate Summerscale considered the "Englishness and datedness" of the original game to be an intrinsic part of its appeal, and felt that the contemporary details would become soon dated. She noted that elements of Cluedo had become cultural reference points, and found the original game to have "a nostalgic aura, blurrily reminiscent of creepy old houses and buried family secrets".

Journalist Cole Moreton compared the release of Discover the Secrets to the New Coke debacle in 1985 and suggested it was only a matter of time before Hasbro would make the correction. In the meantime, he suggested that one should "borrow granny's. Far better to die in England than Blingland".

Robert Colvile of The Telegraph questioned Hasbro's stated rationale in "that the game should reflect 21st-century society — but do its makers really imagine that the faux-Edwardiana of the original, in which the vicar and the doctor and the local spinster gathered at the manor, was an accurate reflection of late-1940s society?" He suggests that the appeal of Cluedo games was "not that they reflect the real world, but that they take you away from it".

== Grab & Go ==
Though Hasbro no longer sells "Discover the Secrets", a variation of the game still exists in their Grab & Go travel series. It plays identically to standard classic rules but visually continues to use the new Discover the Secrets room layout, and three of the new weapons (poison, dumbbell, and pistol) as part of the standard six, as well as retaining other design artwork. However, the Intrigue cards are no longer a part of the game.
