= Cluedo =

Board game

The Classic Mystery Game
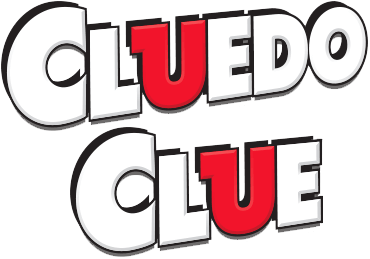
- The Cluedo and Clue logos (2015–2022)
- Designers: Anthony E. Pratt
- Publishers: Hasbro; Waddingtons; Parker Brothers; Winning Moves Games USA
- Publication: 1949; 77 years ago
- Players: 2–6 players
- Setup time: 5 minutes
- Playing time: 10 to 60 minutes
- Chance: Low (dice rolling)
- Age range: 8+
- Skills: Deduction

Related games
- Mysterium, Deception, Scotland Yard

Cluedo (/ˈkluːdoʊ/), known as Clue in North America, is a murder mystery game for three to six players (depending on editions) that was devised in 1943 by British board game designer Anthony E. Pratt. The game was first manufactured by Waddingtons in the United Kingdom in 1949. Since then, it has been relaunched and updated several times, and it is currently owned and published by the American game and toy company Hasbro.

The object of the game is to determine who murdered the game's victim, where the crime took place, and which weapon was used. Each player assumes the role of one of the six suspects and attempts to deduce the correct answer by strategically moving around a game board representing the rooms of a mansion and collecting clues about the circumstances of the murder from the other players.

Numerous games, books, a film, television series, and theatre adaptations have been released as part of the Cluedo franchise. Several spinoffs have been released, featuring various extra characters, weapons, rooms, or different gameplay. The original game is marketed as the "Classic Detective Game", and the various spinoffs are all distinguished by different slogans.

In 2008, Cluedo: Discover the Secrets was created (with changes to the board, gameplay, and characters) as a modern spin-off, but was criticised in the media and by fans of the original game. Cluedo: The Classic Mystery Game was then introduced in 2012, returning to Pratt's classic formula but also adding several variations.

== History ==
Holed up in his home in Birmingham, England, during air raids on the city during World War II, Anthony E. Pratt, an English musician and factory worker, recalled the murder mystery games played by some of his clients at private music soirees as well as the detective fiction popular at the time, most notably Agatha Christie. In 1944, Pratt applied for a patent of his invention of a murder/mystery-themed game, originally named Murder.

Pratt's daughter, Marcia Lewis also credits their neighbour, Geoffrey Bull, the creator of the board game Buccaneer, with planting the idea to make a board game in her father's head. Bull also provided an introduction to Waddingtons. Pratt and his wife, Elva Pratt (1913–1990), who had helped design the game, presented it to Waddingtons' executive Norman Watson, who immediately purchased it and provided its trademark name of Cluedo (a play on "clue" and "ludo", the Latin word for "I play", as used for the name of "Ludo", a popular board game based on Pachisi). The design of the house in the game is reputed to be based on what was the Tudor Close Hotel in Rottingdean, Brighton and Hove, with early editions of the game being titled "Murder at Tudor Close".

Although the patent was granted in 1947, postwar shortages postponed the game's official United Kingdom launch until 1949. It was simultaneously licensed to Parker Brothers in the United States for publication, where it was renamed Clue, as the name "Ludo" was not widely known there, Pachisi-style games having been published under other names and brands, so the play on words would not have been generally understood.

Pratt sold the international rights for £5,000 (equivalent to £121,280 in 2025) in 1953, but continued to receive UK royalties until the patent expired in 1967.

There were several differences between the original game concept and the one initially published in 1949. In particular, Pratt's original design calls for ten characters, one of whom was to be designated the victim by random drawing prior to the start of the game. These ten included the eliminated Mr. Brown, Mr. Gold, Miss Grey, and Mrs. Silver. The characters of Nurse White and Colonel Yellow were renamed Mrs. White and Colonel Mustard for the actual release. The game allowed for play of up to eight remaining characters, providing for nine suspects in total. Originally there were eleven rooms, including the eliminated gun room and cellar. In addition, there were nine weapons, including the unused bomb, syringe, shillelagh (walking stick/cudgel), fireplace poker, and the later used axe and poison. Some of these unused weapons and characters appeared later in spin-off versions of the game.

Some gameplay aspects were different as well. Notably, the remaining playing cards were distributed into the rooms to be retrieved, rather than dealt directly to the players. Players also had to land on another player in order to make suggestions about that player's character through the use of special tokens, and once exhausted, a player could no longer make suggestions. There were other minor differences, all of which were later updated by the game's initial release and remain essentially unchanged in the standard Classic Detective Game editions of the game.

The methodology used in the early versions of Cluedo is remarkably similar to a traditional, if little known, American card game: the king of hearts has five sons. However, Pratt himself said his inspiration was a murder mystery parlour game he used to play with friends in which youngsters "would congregate in each other's homes for parties at weekends. We'd play a stupid game called Murder, where guests crept up on each other in corridors and the victim would shriek and fall on the floor". The country house mystery was a popular subgenre of "cosy" English detective fiction in the 1920s and 1930s; stories were set in a residence of the gentry isolated by circumstances such as a snowstorm with the suspects gathered for a weekend house party.

=== Marketing ===
Cluedo was originally marketed as "The Great New Detective Game" upon its launch in 1949 in North America. A deal was quickly struck to license "The Great New Sherlock Holmes Game" from the Sir Arthur Conan Doyle estate. Advertising at the time suggested players would take on the guise of "Sherlock Holmes following the path of the criminal", but no depictions of Holmes appear in the advertising or on the box. From 1950 until the 1960s, the game was marketed as "The Great Detective Game", at which time it became the "Parker Brothers Detective Game".

Cluedo 1956 UK Edition depicting a Sherlock Holmes type character.

With the launch of the US 1972 edition, a television commercial showed Holmes and Watson engaged in a particularly competitive game. Adjusting with the times, in 1979 US television commercials a detective, resembling a bumbling Inspector Clouseau from the popular Pink Panther film franchise, looks for clues. In 1986, the marketing slogan added "Classic Detective Game" which persists through the last 2002/2003 edition.

In the UK, Cluedo was marketed as "The Great Detective Game" from the mid-1950s until 2000, when it was rebranded as the "Classic Detective Game". However, in the mid-1950s Waddingtons also adopted a Sherlock Holmes-type detective to adorn their box covers for a brief time, though unlike in the US editions, there was no acknowledgement that the character was actually the famous detective. In the 1980s, as in the US, Sherlock Holmes also appeared in TV advertising of the time, along with other classic detectives such as Sam Spade.

== Game ==
=== Equipment ===
The game consists of a board which shows the rooms, corridors, and secret passages of an English country house called Tudor Mansion (named Tudor Close, Tudor Hall, Arlington Grange, Boddy Manor or Boddy Mansion in some editions) in Hampshire, England, in 1926. The game box also includes several coloured playing pieces to represent characters, miniature murder weapon props, two six-sided dice, three sets of cards (describing the aforementioned rooms, characters, or weapons), Solution Cards and an envelope (or a mirror in some editions) to contain one card from each set of cards and a Detective's Notes pad on which are printed lists of rooms, weapons, and characters, so players can keep detailed notes during the game.

=== Characters ===
The figurines and traditional set of North American & UK suspect tokens.

The murder victim in the game was known as Dr. Black in the UK edition and Mr. Boddy in North American versions. Updated editions of the game, released by Hasbro in 2023, refer to him as Boden "Boddy" Black Jr.

Player tokens are typically plastic pawns or figurines; the standard edition of the game has six suspects:

- Miss Scarlett (the second "t" was dropped in North American versions after 1963 and added back in 2016), the stock femme fatale character; she is represented by a red token/figurine.
- Colonel Mustard, a retired military officer with a distinguished career; he is represented by a yellow token/figurine.
- Mrs. White, the chief domestic servant, typically the housekeeper or cook, updated as "Chef White" in the 2023 edition; she is represented by a white token/figurine.
  - In the 2016 edition Mrs. White was replaced by Dr. Orchid, a young biologist and adopted daughter of the victim, represented by a pink token. Dr. Orchid was replaced by Chef White in the 2023 UK and North American editions.
- Reverend Green, the local clergyman, updated as Mayor Green in the 2023 edition; he is represented by a green token/figurine.
  - Known as Mr. Green in North American editions, initially a middle-aged businessman with possible criminal connections turned into a young and handsome playboy.
- Mrs. Peacock, a stylish widowed socialite, updated as "Solicitor Peacock" in the 2023 edition; she is represented by a blue token/figurine.
- Professor Plum, an intelligent yet absent-minded academic; he is represented by a purple token/figurine.

=== Weapons ===
The weapon icons are typically made of unfinished pewter (except the rope, which may be plastic or string); special editions have included gold-plated, brass-finished, and sterling silver versions. Early versions of the game included lead piping that was made from actual lead, and which was replaced with a steel version in later editions.

- Candlestick
- Dagger (Knife in North American editions)
- Lead piping (Lead pipe in North American editions)
- Revolver (first depicted in the UK as a Dreyse M1907 semi-automatic pistol, and in North America as a Colt M1911 pistol)
- Rope
- Spanner (Wrench in North American editions)

=== Rooms ===
The classic board layout. The arrows in the four corner rooms denote secret passages to the opposite corner.

There are nine rooms in the mansion where the murder can take place, laid out around the edge of the square game board. They consist of the hall, the lounge, the dining room, the kitchen, the ballroom, the conservatory, the billiard room, the library, and the study. Each of the four corner rooms contains a secret passage that leads to the room on the opposite diagonal corner of the map. The centre room (often referred to as the cellar or the stairs) is inaccessible to the players, but contains the solution envelope and is not otherwise used during gameplay. Each suspect token has a designated start space marked at the edge of the board. The corridor areas are marked out as square spaces through which the tokens move horizontally or vertically.

=== Rules ===
At the beginning of the play, three cards—one suspect, one room, and one weapon—are chosen at random and put into a special envelope, so that no one can see them. These cards represent the solution. The remainder of the cards are distributed among the players.

Players are instructed to assume the token/suspect nearest them. In older versions, the play begins with Miss Scarlett and proceeds clockwise. In modern versions, all players roll the die/dice and the highest total starts the game, with play again proceeding clockwise. Players roll the die/dice and move along the board's corridor spaces, or into the rooms accordingly.

The objective of the game is to deduce the details of the murder, i.e. the cards in the envelope. There are six characters, six murder weapons, and nine rooms, leaving the players with 324 possibilities. As soon as a player enters a room, they may make a suggestion as to the details, naming a suspect, the room they are in, and the weapon. For example: "I suspect Professor Plum, in the Dining Room, with the candlestick". The player's suggestion must include the room they are currently in and may not be made in the corridors. The tokens for the suggested suspect and weapon are immediately moved into that room if they are not both already present. Players may include themselves and weapons/suspects for which they hold cards in their suggestions.

Once a player makes a suggestion, the others are called upon to disprove it. If the player to their left holds any of the three named cards, that player must privately show one (and only one) of the cards to the current player. Otherwise, the process continues clockwise around the table until either one player disproves the suggestion, or no one can do so. A player's turn normally ends once their suggestion is completed.

A player who believes they have determined the correct elements may make an accusation on their turn. The accusation can include any room, not necessarily the one occupied by the player (if any), and may be made immediately following a suggestion. The accusing player privately checks the three cards in the envelope. If they match the accusation, the player shows them to everyone and wins; if not, the player returns them to the envelope and may not move nor make suggestions/accusations for the remainder of the game. However, the other players can move their tokens into rooms when making suggestions and they must continue to privately show cards to disprove the suggestions. A player who makes a false accusation while blocking the door to a room must move into that room so others can enter and leave. If all players except one make false accusations, the remaining player wins by default.

If a player's suggestion has brought another player's token into a room, the second player may make their own suggestion in the room when their turn comes up, if desired. If not, they may move out of the room, and if able to reach another room, make a suggestion therein, as usual. In the American version, players are not allowed to make suggestions repeatedly by remaining in one room; if they wish to make a second suggestion, they must first spend a turn out of the room.

=== Strategy ===
The choice of playing piece can make a difference. Mrs. Peacock has an immediate advantage of starting one space closer to the first room than any of the other players. Professor Plum can move to the study, and then take the secret passage to the Kitchen, the hardest room to reach. Traditionally, Miss Scarlett had the advantage of moving first, although this has been eliminated with the implementation of the high-roll rule in modern versions.

Making as many suggestions as possible maximises how much information a player can gain, which is advantageous. Therefore, moving into a new room as frequently as possible is one way to meet this goal. Mrs. Peacock has an advantage in that she is closest to the Conservatory, a corner room with a secret passage, enabling a player on their turn to move immediately to another room and make a suggestion after rolling the dice. Miss Scarlett has a similar advantage to the Lounge. Players should make good use of the secret passages. Following the shortest path between rooms then is a good choice, even if a player already holds the card representing that room in their hand. Blocking the passage of another player prevents them from attaining rooms from which to make suggestions.

Each player begins the game with three to six cards in their hand, depending on the number of players. Keeping track of which cards are shown to each player is important in deducing the solution. Detective Notes are supplied with the game to make this task easier. The pads can keep not only a history of which cards are in a player's hand but also which cards have been shown by another player. It can also be useful in deducing which cards the other players have shown one another. For example, if Miss Scarlett disproves Rev. Green's accusation that Mrs. Peacock did the crime in the Ballroom with the Candlestick, a player with both the Ballroom and Mrs. Peacock cards in their hand can then deduce that Miss Scarlett has the Candlestick.

A player makes a suggestion to learn which cards may be eliminated from suspicion, but in some cases, it may be advantageous for a player to include one of their own cards in a suggestion. This technique can be used for both forcing a player to reveal a different card as well as misleading other players into believing a specific card is suspect. Therefore, moving into a room already held in the player's hand may work to their advantage. Suggestions may also be used to thwart a player's opponent. Since every suggestion results in a suspect token being re-located to the suggested room, a suggestion may be used to prevent another player from achieving their intended destination, preventing them from suggesting a particular room, especially if that player appears to be getting close to a solution.

== Editions ==
Parker Brothers and Waddingtons each produced their own unique editions between 1949 and 1992. Hasbro purchased both companies in the early 1990s and continued to produce unique editions for each market until 2002/2003 when the current edition of Cluedo/Clue was first released. At this time, Hasbro produced a unified product across markets. The game was then localised with regional differences in spelling and naming conventions.

During Cluedo's long history, eight unique Clue editions were published in North America (1949, 1956/1960, 1960/1963, 1972, 1986, 1992, 1996, and 2002), including miniaturised "travel" editions. However, only three distinct editions of Cluedo were released in the UK – the longest of which lasted 47 years from its introduction in 1949 until its first successor in 1996. The eighth North American and fourth UK editions constitute the current shared game design. International versions occasionally developed their own unique designs for specific editions, although most drew on the designs and art from either the US or UK editions, and in some cases mixing elements from both, while localising others – specifically suspect portraits.

In July 2008, Hasbro released a revamped look for Clue in a reinvention called "Clue: Discover the Secrets". This new version of the game offered major changes to the gameplay and to the characters and their backstories.

In July 2016, Hasbro replaced Mrs. White with a new character, Dr. Orchid, represented by an orchid pink piece. In this current standard edition, Mrs. Peacock has a new game-opening opportunity as her starting square is one step closer to the billiard room (with 9 steps instead of 10). The squared-off door to the Conservatory makes the room harder for Rev. Green to reach as an opening move and increases the distance between the Ballroom and the Conservatory (from 4 steps to 5).

In January 2023, Hasbro released a new edition of the game that included new miniatures and updated art and character backstories.

While the suspects' appearance and interior design of Dr. Black's/Mr. Boddy's mansion changed with each edition, the weapons underwent relatively minor changes, with the only major redesign occurring in the fourth 1972 US edition, which was adopted by the second 1996 UK edition and remains the standard configuration across all Classic Detective Game versions since. The artwork for the previous US editions tended to reflect the current popular style at the time they were released. The earlier UK editions were more artistically stylised themes. From 1972 on, the US editions presented lush box cover art depicting the six suspects in various candid poses within a room of the mansion. The UK would finally adopt this style only in its third release in 2000, prior to which Cluedo boxes depicted basic representations of the contents. Such lavish box art illustrations have become a hallmark of the game since copied for the numerous licensed variants which pay homage to Clue.

=== Cluedo: Discover the Secrets ===
In August 2008, Hasbro redesigned and updated the board, characters, weapons, and rooms. Changes to the rules of gameplay were made, some to accommodate the new features.

The suspects have new names and backgrounds, as well as differing abilities that may be used during the game. The revolver is now a pistol, the lead pipe and spanner/wrench have been removed, and a baseball bat, axe, dumbbell, trophy, and poison have been added. The nine rooms have changed to (in clockwise order): Hall, Guest House, Dining Room, Kitchen, Patio, Spa, Theatre, Living Room, and Observatory.

There is also a second deck of cards—the Intrigue cards. In this deck, there are two types of cards, Keepers and Clocks. Keepers are special abilities; for example, "You can see the card". There are eight clocks—the first seven drawn do nothing—whoever draws the eighth is killed by the murderer and is out of the game.

The player must move to the indoor swimming pool in the centre of the board to make an accusation. This adds some challenge versus the ability to make accusations from anywhere in the original game.

The most significant change to gameplay is that once the suspect cards have been taken, the remaining cards are dealt so that all players have an even number of cards (rather than dealt out so that "one player may have a slight advantage"). This means that depending on the number of players a number of cards are left over. These cards are placed face down in the middle and are not seen unless a player takes a turn in the pool room to look at them.

The changes to the game have been criticised in the media, and by fans of the game, for unnecessarily altering classic cultural icons.

As of 2014, Hasbro no longer sells the game via its website, but they do continue to sell a version of it as part of their Grab & Go travel series. Notably, it plays identically to standard classic rules but visually continues to use the new Discover the Secrets room layout, and two of the new weapons, as well as other design artwork. However, the Intrigue cards are no longer a part of the game.

=== Clue/Cluedo: The Classic Mystery Game ===
Clue/Cluedo is a digital adaptation based on the official Hasbro board game developed by Marmalade Game Studio for iOS and Android mobile devices as well as Steam and Nintendo Switch. The object of the game is to determine who killed the game's victim Dr. Black (or Mr. Boddy). The player, as one of the six suspects, will ask questions and take notes. The overall goal is to solve the crime first.

=== Notable editions ===
- Clue "Master Detective" (1988), an expanded version of the game featuring 12 rooms, 10 characters, and eight weapons with support for up to 10 players. In addition to the regular cast, Clue Master Detective adds Miss Peach, Monsieur Brunette, Madame Rose, and Sergeant Gray to the list of suspects. It also added poison and a horseshoe to the assortment of weapons. The fountain, the gazebo, the courtyard, and the carriage house were added to the list of rooms. This game is currently published in the US by Winning Moves Games USA.
- Cluedo: 50th Anniversary (1999), also released as Clue: 50th Anniversary in the United States in 1998, this standard edition came in a "deluxe" format with the option to play with an extra murder weapon, a bottle of poison. This edition was also issued in a miniaturised Cluedo European travel version. Drew Struzan provided artwork for the game, which was originally created for the US 1996 edition and additionally used for The Limited Gift Edition and the US Clue Card Game, but he did not create the Rev. Green portrait used in the Cluedo editions.
- Clue "Nostalgia Edition" (2003, 2007) is a retro Nostalgia edition of the game, essentially a re-issue of the 1963 design in a wooden box. A custom version of the game was also released in the US by Restoration Hardware as Wooden Box Clue with different cover art. In the UK it was released under the Cluedo brand, and was an official re-issue of the original 1949 Waddingtons' design.
- Clue "Vintage Edition" (2005, 2009), also released as Cluedo "Vintage Edition", is a re-formatted nostalgia edition into a vintage bookshelf collection along with a series of other popular board games. In the Cluedo version, they continued to use the 1963 design and adapted it for the UK market for the first time with localised characters and naming conventions.
- Cluedo Junior, in which the game has been simplified for children, with the murder theme replaced with "who ate the cake?" and "who broke the toy?"

== Franchise ==
The board game franchise spans a 1985 feature film, a 1997 musical, a 2011 mini-series, numerous books, and several video games. First staged in 2017, a theatrical adaptation of the Clue film began a U.S. national tour in 2024.

== Worldwide differences ==
Besides some rule differences listed above, some versions label the characters, weapons, rooms and in some instances the game itself differently.

In Canada and the U.S., the game is known as Clue. It was retitled because the traditional British board game Ludo, on which the name is based, was less well known there than its American variant Parcheesi.

The North American versions of Clue also replace the character "Reverend Green" from the original Cluedo with "Mr. Green". This is the only region to continue to make such a change. Minor changes include "Miss Scarlett" with her name spelled with one 't', the spanner being called a wrench, and the dagger being renamed a knife. In the 2016 U.S. edition, the knife was changed to a dagger. Until 2003, the lead piping was known as the lead pipe only in the North American edition.

In some international versions of the game (mostly the Spanish-language ones), the colours of some pieces are different, so as to correspond with the changes to each suspect's unique foreign name variations. In some cases, rooms and weapons are changed in addition to other regional variances.

In South America, it is licensed and sold under several names. In Brazil, it is marketed under the Portuguese name Detetive.

== Recognition ==
Games magazine included Clue in their Top 100 Games of 1980, praising it as "still the classic detective game", Top 100 Games of 1981 ("[the] characters in this 32-year-old game have become household words"), and Top 100 Games of 1982 ("Millions love this classic mystery game").

In November 2025, Anthony Pratt's daughter, Marcia Lewis, donated her father's correspondence and memorabilia relating to the game, including an original version, to Birmingham Archives at the Library of Birmingham and to Birmingham Museum and Art Gallery.

== See also ==
- 13 Dead End Drive (related board game)
- Clue (1992 video game)
- Clue (1998 video game)
- Kill Doctor Lucky (related board game and parody)
- Orient Express (related board game)
- Mr. Ree! (related board game)
- Whodunit (related board game)
