= Clue =

Clue may refer to:

- Clue (information) – a piece of information bringing someone closer to a conclusion.

== People with the name ==
- DJ Clue (born 1975), mixtape DJ
- Fredy Clue (born 1994 or 1995), Swedish artist and musician
- Oliver Clue
- Tim Clue
- Arthur Clues (1924–1998), Australian rugby league footballer
- Ivan Clues
- Tim Cluess

== Arts, entertainment, and media ==
=== Clue entertainment franchise ===
- Cluedo (known as Clue in North America), a crime fiction board game, and derivative items:
  - Clue (1992 video game), full title: Clue: Parker Brothers' Classic Detective Game
  - Clue (1998 video game), full title: Clue: Murder at Boddy Mansion or Cluedo: Murder at Blackwell Grange
  - Clue (book series), series of 18 children's books published throughout the 1990s
  - Clue (film), 1985 American ensemble mystery comedy film based on the board game.
  - Clue (miniseries), five-part mystery television miniseries which aired on The Hub
  - Clue (mobile games), two distinct adaptations of the board game for mobile devices
  - Clue (musical), full title: Clue The Musical
  - Clue: On Stage

=== Music ===
- Clues (band), from Montreal
- Clues (Clues album), 2009
- Clues (Robert Palmer album), 1980
- "Clue", a song by Frente! from the album Shape (album), 1996

=== Other uses in arts, entertainment, and media ===
- Clues in detective fiction, a type of literary device
- "Clues" (Star Trek: The Next Generation), a television episode
- The Clue, a 1915 American silent film
- Suraag – The Clue, an Indian TV series

== Science and technology ==
- Clue (mobile app), a menstrual health app developed by BioWink GmbH
- Clue cell, a type of vaginal cell
- Cluster Exploratory, or CluE, a National Science Foundation-funded research program
- Comprehensive Loss Underwriting Exchange, an insurance claim tracking service

== See also ==
- Clew, part of a sail
- CLU (disambiguation)
- Evidence
