= Online quiz =

Quizzes that are published on the Internet

Online quizzes are quizzes that are published on the Internet and can be used for entertainment, educational, or professional purposes. Entertainment quizzes are generally free to play, and include both identity quizzes and knowledge entertainment quizzes sub-types. Identity-type quizzes are frequently used to assign abstract characteristics (often referencing a wide variety of pop-culture subjects) or personality types. Websites hosting such quizzes include BuzzFeed, Pottermore, and 16 personalities. Knowledge entertainment quizzes question the user on general or more specific and topic-based knowledge. These quizzes can be found on websites such as Sporcle, JetPunk, and Quizly. For educational online quizzes, sets of questions and answers are frequently user-generated, and accessible to the public user-base. Quizzes of this type can be found on sites such as Kahoot! or Quizlet. Other practical applications for quizzes include vocational quizzes, and quizzes for advertising purposes.

== History ==
Different types of online quizzes have gained prominence alongside corresponding cultural events. Online quizzes on popular culture were reported to emerge in 2014, alongside the increased use of social media (e.g. Facebook) or news websites (e.g. Buzzfeed) where they were integrated into the sites themselves. Online quizzes are internet extensions of quizzes originally found in print media, television and radio. Related are the histories of trivia and quiz competitions, like Quiz Bowl and Jeopardy, board games like Trivial Pursuit and creative sections of print magazines like Cosmopolitan.

=== Connection to modern online society ===
Websites and platforms across a variety of industries integrate online quizzes, as part of the rise of gamification.For online platforms, online quizzes can enhance digital advertising, increase online patrons’ time and interaction spent on a page, and garner more positive attitudes towards content.

=== Reactions to the Covid-19 Pandemic ===
The COVID-19 pandemic brought increased use of online quizzes with the shift towards interactive content and digital media. In the United Kingdom, online quizzes were reported to be replacing popular pub quiz games unable to be held in-person. Some quizzes were direct reactions to the societal state during the pandemic, marketed towards increasing amusement to cope with quarantine and relieve boredom.

The transition to mandated online education during the pandemic increased the popularity of online quizzes as educational tools. Regular use of online quizzes could prompt feedback from students mid-lecture and encourage interaction to avoid challenges with short attention span and fatigue from virtual environments.

== Entertainment quizzes ==
=== Identity quizzes ===
Identity quizzes can provide quiz-takers with new self-knowledge, and became key web-traffic drivers in 2014. Buzzfeed was a prominent platform for viral identity quizzes, helping to bring them into mainstream use. Quiz topics vary, with offerings ranging from pop-culture, to food, to distinct personality types. When taking an identity quiz, users complete a set of questions (frequently of the multiple choice variety), until an algorithm presents a nominal answer and an explanation for the results.

Some identity quizzes provide users with a typology from an established system of personality patterns. Utilized models include the Myers-Briggs Type Indicator, the Enneagram and Big Five personality traits. Unlike other identity quizzes, variations of these quizzes have been professionally produced and implemented in practical settings, including clinical therapeutics. Their structure is based in psychological practice, drawing on theories from figures such as Carl Jung. Personality quizzes are available on websites such as 16personalities, the Enneagram Institute and Truity.

=== Knowledge Entertainment Quizzes ===
Knowledge quizzes gauge a users’ knowledgeability on a given subject through the selection of correct answers in a multiple choice format. Like identity quizzes, the subject of trivia questions may vary, with the entertainment aspect derived in their basis in topics of interest to the user, including popular culture or select niches like geography or professional sports. Unlike identity quizzes, outputs are typically numerical in nature, offering the user a score of proficiency.

== Educational quizzes ==
Online quizzes can be used for student assessments and self-assessment, and as a resource to learn and memorize information. Student-generated quiz games incorporate active learning by requiring students to review, organize, and apply course material. Online platforms such as Kahoot!, Quizizz, and Socrative allows educators and students to create interactive quiz games using game-like features, including competition, scoring, and multiplayer participation, to encourage classroom engagement. Online quizzes can serve as “exit tickets” administered at the end of lessons to assess student understanding and provide immediate feedback. Online quizzes are used in both in-person and in remote education, including asynchronous activities. Online quiz platforms support student assessment and monitor learning during the transition to remote education, particularly during the COVID-19 pandemic. Online quiz platforms for self-assessment and memorization include flashcard programs such as Quizlet and Anki which allow users to create and share study sets. These platforms use spaced repetition and active recall to support long-term knowledge retention.

== Practical applications ==
Online quizzes have a variety of practical uses in education, employment, career guidance, dating, marketing, health, and research. Online quizzes can be administered to users regardless of their geographic location.

=== Education ===
In education, online quizzes are used as formative and summative assessments. Instructors administer them to check students’ understanding during a course, to assign grades, or to provide practice before examinations.

=== Employment ===
In employment, organizations use online quizzes for training, onboarding and certification, and as pre-screening for recruitment and employee selection. Some of these tests are taken remotely without supervision.

Career assessment quizzes ask users about their preferences and suggest occupations or fields of study. Traditionally, career assessments were interest inventories completed on paper with career counsellors. Computer-assisted systems later delivered them electronically. Online quizzes allow users to complete them without a counsellor.

=== Health ===
Online questionnaires are used in health settings for self-assessment and screening. They have also been developed to measure an individual’s health literacy.

=== Commercial ===
Businesses use online quizzes in marketing for lead generation, audience segmentation, and product recommendation. In these formats, users answer questions and receive a personalized result, such as a product suggestion, sometimes in exchange for contact details.

=== Researchers ===
Researchers use online quizzes and questionnaires to recruit participants and collect data.

=== Online Dating ===
Some online dating services use questionnaires to generate matches between users. Users answer questions about personality, values, lifestyle, or relationship preferences, and the service uses the responses to suggest or rank potential partners, a process often described as “matching” or a “matching algorithm.”

Examples include eHarmony, whose online questionnaire was built around a set of “dimensions of compatibility” and OkCupid who uses questions written by its users.

== See also ==
- Sploofus
- BuzzFeed
- Quizlet
- Kahoot!
