= Hochstetler =

Hochstetler is a surname originating in Switzerland, particularly in Bern-Mittelland.

The current Swiss spelling of the name is Hostettler. Among non-Swiss there are a variety of spellings: Hochstetler, Hochstettler, Hostetler, Hostettler and Hochstedler are among the most common. Hochstetler is common among Amish and Mennonite families.

Notable people with the family name Hochstetler include:

- Thomas J. Hochstettler, president of Lewis & Clark College
- Dallas Hostetler, originator of Tax Freedom Day
- Dave Hostetler, American baseball player
- Jeff Hostetler, American football player
- John A. Hostetler, Amish and Mennonite historian
- Joseph C. Hostetler, founding partner of Baker & Hostetler
- John Hostettler, American politician from Indiana
