= GJ =

GJ or Gj may refer to:

== Science and technology ==
- Gigajoule (GJ), a unit of energy
- Gastrojejunal feeding tube, in medicine
- Gliese–Jahreiß Catalogue, in star designators

== Transport codes ==
- Gujarat, the Indian state in vehicle registrations
- Eurofly, an Italian airline (by defunct IATA code)
- Mexicargo, a Mexican airline (defunct IATA code)
- Loong Air, a Chinese airline (IATA code)

== Other uses ==
- Gj (letter), a Latin digraph
- Gebirgsjäger, alpine light infantry of Austria and Germany
- Gharjamai, a live-in son-in-Law
- Gilets jaunes (yellow vests) movement, grassroots political movement in France
- "GJ!", a song by Babymetal on the 2016 album Metal Resistance
- An acronym for Geometry Jump, the old name of the video-game Geometry Dash

== See also ==
- Good job (disambiguation)
