= Quiz league =

Organised quizzing format

A quiz league is an organization running quizzes on a home and away basis, usually in pubs. Like the pub quiz, it is chiefly a British phenomenon although the format has significant differences to a pub quiz due to the usual number of teams (two) and the presence of individual questions.

== Team format ==
Two teams, one Home, one Away play each other, responding, perhaps alternately, often orally, to a questionmaster.

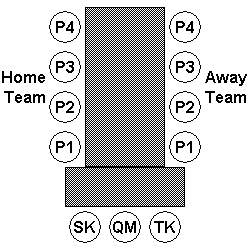
Positions for a typical league quiz played in Merseyside Quiz Leagues (MQL) or the Quiz League of London (QLL) SK=Scorekeeper, QM=Question master, TK=timekeeper. In practice, SK, QM and TK are often carried out by just two people or even by only one person

Many varying formats exist, one of the most widely played having been devised as a game used by soldiers when relaxing is usually known as the Merseyside Quiz Leagues (MQL) format. It consists of 64 questions in 8 rounds of 8 questions each asked to individuals on the teams alternately. Correctly answering your own question scores 2 points though it can be passed within the team (if the player chooses not to answer) or over to the other team (if the player or team answer wrongly) for one point.

In the MQL format, there is no conferring as such. Where a player decides not to answer their question, the team captain will normally decide which other member of the team is to answer by assessing the hand signals made by the players on the team and his/her own judgement. The opposition will also use hand signals to decide who is to answer the question in the event of it being passed over. After 4 rounds, the order of answering changes so the team who began round 1 going first begin round 5 going second. This is done by switching each team's questions from A to B or from B to A depending on which questions they started with. The MQL format is played by the main leagues in London and Merseyside.

Other formats exist that involve more conferring within teams, list rounds and "pick a category" rounds. All questions are team questions and both teams answer the same questions which are written down on an answer sheet and handed in at the end of the round. There are four rounds of ten questions, and a picture round.

== Individual format ==
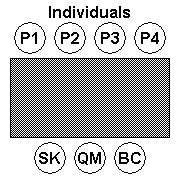
Positions for a typical individual quiz played in Merseyside Quiz Leagues (MQL) or the Quiz League of London (QLL) SK=Scorekeeper, QM=Question master, BC=Bonus counter

Many quiz leagues run individual competitions. The format used by Merseyside Quiz Leagues and the Quiz League of London is the MIMIR quiz (named after Mímir, a god of Norse mythology who was renowned for his knowledge and wisdom). Matches are played in groups of four with positions drawn at random and each person has 3 questions addressed to them, in each of 5 rounds.

Time to answer is at the discretion of the question master but a wrong answer or a pass gives any of the other three an opportunity to score a bonus point. The decision as to who gets the first chance to answer for a bonus is determined by offering the question to whoever, at that stage, has made least attempts to gain bonus points or, if there is more than one player who has made the least bonus attempts, the next player in line (e.g. if this happened on the first question, P2 would have the first option on a bonus attempt). As well as a scorekeeper, a bonus counter is needed to track each player's bonus attempts.

== See also ==
- Protmušis
- Pub quiz
