= GJB =

GJB can refer to:

- George Jackson Brigade, American activist group
- Gap junction β, subcategory of gap junction proteins
- Good Job, Brain!, English-language trivia podcast
- Trans-Air-Link, defunct airline with its hub at Miami–Opa Locka Airport in Miami-Dade County, Florida, U.S.; see List of defunct airlines of the United States (Q–Z)#T

== See also ==
- GJB 5860-2006, Chinese military technical standard
