= Quern – Undying Thoughts =

2016 video game

- Steam digital banner art
- Publisher: Zadbox Entertainment
- Director: Dániel Poszmik
- Designer: Ábel Szakács
- Programmer: Gergely Gulyás
- Composer: Marcell Kerepesi
- Engine: Unity
- Platforms: Windows, macOS, Linux, Xbox One
- Release: 28 November 2016
- Genre: Adventure

Quern – Undying Thoughts is a 2016 adventure video game developed by Zadbox Entertainment for Windows, Mac, and Linux, and ported in 2020 to the Xbox One and 2026 for the Nintendo Switch. As a person trapped upon an isolated island, players must solve puzzles in the open world to find a way to escape. The game was developed by four Hungarian graduate students who initially designed the game as a student project, scaling development after receiving support from a Kickstarter campaign. Upon release, Quern received positive reviews, with critics favorably comparing its design to the adventure titles Myst and Riven, as well as praising its visual and puzzle design.

== Gameplay ==
Players explore a 3D environment in first-person perspective, where players can roam freely across an isolated island. Playing as a person teleported to the island of Quern with no memory of their surroundings, the objective of the game is to escape. The narrative of Quern is told through letters left throughout the island from its previous inhabitant, Profesor Maythorn.

Players control and move using the mouse and keyboard, clicking the right mouse button to lock the camera and point and click. Menus allows players to examine or interact collected items in an inventory, collect letters scatted throughout the island, and review notes or in-game screenshots in a notebook. A map also allows for navigation through explored areas. Completion of puzzles allows players to progress to new sections of the island, such as by powering or manipulating machines, with some opening doors, unlocking passages or shortcuts. Puzzles feature different mechanics relying on clues found throughout the environment, allowing players to use crystals with different functions, mix alchemical potions and collect herbs in a garden.

== Development and release ==
Quern was developed by Zadbox Entertainment, a Hungarian studio founded in 2015 by Daniel Poszmik, Gergely Gulás, Marcell Kerepesi, and Abel Szakács. The studio sought to design "something old school but still fresh" in the puzzle game genre, taking influence from the adventure video game Myst. It initially conceived as a student project, with composer Marcell Kerepes writing the music for the game's concept for his thesis. Development of Quern as a full game was supported by a successful Kickstarter campaign, the first Hungarian game to do so. It was developed using the Unity 5 game engine. Quern was ported to the Xbox One in April 2020, and to the Nintendo Switch on 6 October 2026.

== Reception ==
Reception

Aggregate score
Aggregator	Score
Metacritic	83%

Review scores
Publication	Score
Adventure Gamers	4/5
Nintendo World Report	7.5/10
Just Adventure	A-
PC World	4/5

According to review aggregator website Metacritic, Quern received "generally favorable" reviews. Critics considered the game bore a strong resemblance to Myst and Riven, with Kevin Hoelscher of Adventure Gamers comparing its motifs of portals, machinery and deserted islands. Describing Quern as "the Riven successor we never got", Hayden Dingman of PC World viewed the game as featuring a similar visual and gameplay design, highlighting its "unique and unusual" world design and "grim and lonesome" tone. Hoelscher felt the game lacked features that distinguished it from these titles, but felt Quern was "technically polished", featured a "top-notch" visual presentation, and had a large variety of puzzles.

The design of Quern was also praised generally. Cindy Kyser of Just Adventure described it as a "thinking person's game", writing that its puzzles were complex and highly challenging and that its user interface and tools were useful in supporting players to solve them. Praising the game's "calm sense of escapism", Tom Senior of PC Gamer wrote that the game's slower pace and lack of threats a "comforting" alternative to modern puzzle titles. John Rairdin of Nintendo World Report praised the game's variety of puzzles and interconnected world, but felt the Nintendo Switch version "severely downgraded" the game's visual presentation, faulting its "comically short" draw distance, low-resolution textures and "blocky" shadows.
