= CLU =

The term CLU can refer to:

== Organizations ==
- California Lutheran University
- Claremont Lincoln University
- Communion and Liberation – University
- Czech Lacrosse Union

== Other uses ==
- CLU (gene), the gene for clusterin
- CLU (programming language)
- Clu (Tron), fictional character from the Tron franchise
  - Clu 2, the main antagonist of Tron: Legacy; based on the original Clu
- Chartered Life Underwriter, a financial professional designation
- Clunes railway station, Victoria
- Command Launch Unit for the FGM-148 Javelin
- Common Land Unit
- Containerized living unit

== See also ==
- Clue (disambiguation)
