= Hostetler =

Hostetler is a surname of German origin. Notable people with the surname include:

- Abraham J. Hostetler (1818–1899), American politician from Indiana
- Chuck Hostetler (1903–1971), American baseball player
- Daniel Hostetler, founder and owner of JetPunk
- Dave Hostetler (born 1956), American baseball player
- David Hostetler (1926–2015), American sculptor
- Jeff Hostetler (born 1961), American football player
- John A. Hostetler (1918–2001), American scholar of the Amish and Hutterite societies

== See also ==
- Hostettler
- Hochstetler
