= Clues in detective fiction =

Literary device

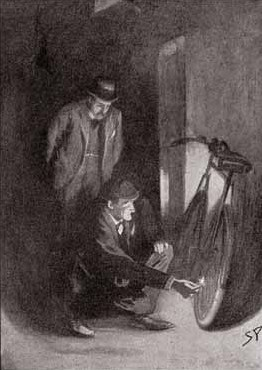
The fictional detective Sherlock Holmes depicted examining a bike for clues in "The Adventure of the Priory School" (1904)

Clues are a common literary device in detective fiction. They are pieces of information in the narrative, such as physical evidence or testimony, that allow the detective to solve a crime or mystery. They are usually revealed to the reader at the same point in story as they are discovered by the detective, although they may be hidden in plain sight or presented alongside red herrings.

== Definition and etymology ==
A clue is something that guides someone towards a solution, especially a piece of evidence that helps to solve a crime. The word clue originated as an alternative spelling of clew, meaning a ball of yarn, often used metaphorically to refer to the use of balls of yarn in mythology and folklore to guide one through a maze.

The word clew was used in Edgar Allan Poe's 1841 short story "The Murders in the Rue Morgue", often credited as the first modern detective story. Within a detective story, a clue is a piece of information that allows the detective to solve a crime or mystery. They can take the form of physical evidence, testimony, sounds, smells, observations or actions.

== Features ==
One of the defining aspects of detective fiction is the concept of "double plot": there is the story of the crime in the past and the story of the investigation in the present. The reader reads the story of the investigation, during which the story of the crime is uncovered. The detective pieces together the past by the interpretation of clues. In this sense, clues are a kind of metonymy, something that provides a connection between cause and effect, past and present. They link the crime to the criminal's state of mind and the traces they leave behind in a fully rational picture that can be reconstructed through the interpretation of clues, creating a sense of order and coherence to the story.

Clues are pervasive within detective stories and can potentially be any detail mentioned in the text. Their significance may not be immediately apparent and attention is not drawn to them, essentially making them "simple markers without anticipation". Furthermore, genuine clues are hidden among red herrings that appear as clues but mislead the reader as to the true solution to the mystery. It is only in retrospect, after the detective reveals the true series of events, that the meaning of the genuine clues becomes clear. Therefore, clues are linked to the detective's ability to notice details that are out of place yet appear mundane, and their ability to discriminate between genuine clues, red herrings, and meaningless coincidences.

Some detective stories present detection as a puzzle or game, placing the reader in competition with the detective to solve the crime. As a result, clues are linked to the concept of fair play, the idea that writers of detective fiction should give their readers a fair chance of solving the mystery. According to this idea, clues should be visible within the text, even if they are presented neutrally. A vital clue should not be revealed by the detective at the last moment. Furthermore, the clues in a detective story should be decodable: it should at least be possible for the reader to use them to solve the mystery.

Clues can be rational or intuitive. The first kind is associated with a positivistic or scientific worldview, prioritising material evidence, comparing statements to find inconsistencies, and rational deduction. These clues are things that do not fit into the wider picture, allowing the detective to track down the source of the discrepancy. The other type of clue is more intuitive and may involve an ability to imagine the criminal's state of mind or to tap into one's own subconscious. It is more associated with contemplation and a historicist focus on motives.

=== Contrast with other concepts ===
Clues do not necessarily lead to proof beyond reasonable doubt. For example, in the novel Death on the Nile, the detective Hercule Poirot uses clues to uncover the culprits of a murder, but lacks the evidence to prove it conclusively. According to Richard York, clues are generally not conclusive proof because that would dispel the mystery too easily. The purpose of clues is, rather, to remain puzzling to retain intrigue until the detective's reveal.

Clues are also not equivalent to the concept of forensic evidence. Clues do not require highly specialised, scientific analysis to interpret and can be understood by a single detective through common sense and reasoning. Forensic evidence, by contrast, requires whole teams of experts to analyse and interpret. Another device used in detective fiction linked to teams is the idea of following up leads. This is when a team of police investigators follow standard procedures by questioning subjects and checking details that may or may not reveal useful information.

== History ==
A device similar to the clue is used in some precursors and early examples of the detective genre. However, it was Edgar Allan Poe's short story "The Murders in the Rue Morgue" in 1841 that introduced the word clew. The story's detective character C. Auguste Dupin uses various clues combined with imaginative intuition to solve two mysterious deaths that had occurred in a locked room. A large part of the story is focused on describing Dupin's analytical character and methods of detection.

Dupin was a major influence on Arthur Conan Doyle's Sherlock Holmes stories. According to Franco Moretti, clues were used inconsistently by crime writers leading up to and around the time of Doyle's Sherlock Holmes stories. Moretti claims they were often not necessary to solve the crime, were sometimes revealed by the detective at the last moment, and were not visible or decodable to the reader. He attributes the invention of the decodable clue to Doyle, although he notes that it was not used extensively in the Sherlock Holmes stories. Nonetheless, he claims that the success of Sherlock Holmes in the 19th and 20th centuries was due to the popularity of the clue as a literary device. This is contested by other theorists, like Christopher Prendergast, who claim that the character of Holmes himself was the key to Doyle's success.

Clues as a visible and decodable aspect of the text became more prominent in the Golden Age of Detective Fiction in Britain in the 1920s and 1930s. Authors such as Agatha Christie and S. S. Van Dine popularised the subgenre of detective fiction called clue-puzzles, which aimed to act as a puzzle solvable by the reader. Various authors attempted to outline the rules of good detective fiction, many of which emphasised the idea that clues should not be withheld from the reader. Van Dine's "Twenty Rules of the Detective Story" (1928), for example, states "All clues must be plainly stated and described" and Ronald Knox's "Ten Commandments" (1929) of detective fiction says "the detective is bound to declare any clues which he may discover".

Around the same time, the hardboiled detective genre became popular in the United States during the Prohibition era. The detectives in these novels are hardened and cynical, surviving in a chaotic world of crime and corruption through street smarts instead of intellectualism. Clues are less likely to play a central role; often they are meaningless or the detective fails to understand them until too late. Clues also became the focus of parody and postmodern deconstruction. The pseudonymous Ellery Queen novels, like The Roman Hat Mystery (1929), were devoted to the rules of the clue-puzzle, but nonetheless provided metatextual commentary on clues and unrealistic, melodramatic reveals. In the metaphysical detective fiction of writers like Jorge Luis Borges, clues are indecipherable and mislead the detective, ultimately destabilising the idea of a rational, coherent world.

By the 1950s, the police procedural became the predominant form of detective fiction. It often placed less focus on clues that could be interpreted by a single, brilliant detective, and more focus on forensic evidence interpreted by teams of experts and the following up of possible leads.
