= Good Job =

Good Job or Good Job! may refer to:

- Good Job (song), 2020 song by American recording artist Alicia Keys
- Good Job!, 2020 video game published by Nintendo
- Good Job! (album), 2005 album by the Japanese hip hop group Rip Slyme
- Good Job, Brain!, quiz show and trivia podcast
- Good Job, Good Job, 2009 South Korean television series
- Good Job (TV series), 2022 South Korean television series
- "Good Job" (Motherland), a 2019 television episode
