= Clue Mysteries (book series) =

Books based upon the Cluedo/Clue franchise

Clue (or Cluedo) Mysteries (sometimes called Clue Mysteries, 15 whodunits to solve in minutes) are two books released in 2003 and 2004 based upon the Clue board game. Both were written by Canadian author, Vicki Cameron. Cameron lives in Ontario.

== Overview ==
Each book contains fifteen mysteries, set up in a similar fashion to the 1990s book series, but meant for a more mature audience. However, the Clue Mysteries have some comic absurdity like the 1990s series. The characters take on names similar to the North American version but more often than not have backstories nearer to the European. The setting is at the Hampshire Mansion, Tudor Hall in 1926 Interwar Britain. The original author, Nigel Tappin, backed out of the project and Canadian mystery author Vicki Cameron took over, finishing two books.

== Storyline ==
John Boddy will rightfully inherit both Tudor Hall and his deceased uncle Sir Hugh Black's vast fortune on his upcoming thirtieth birthday. For one reason or another, Hugh had put Boddy, Peacock, Scarlet, Mustard, Green and Plum on a generous monthly allowance for years. The poor maid, it seems, never saw a penny; she lives at the mansion in exchange for cooking and cleaning.

While Boddy spent his allowance wisely, investing and being select with his purchases, the others had all been taking greedy advantages while Hugh was alive, cheating him out of more money over the years and blowing their allowances on frivolity. Boddy, upon claiming Hugh's fortune, stands to end that immediately, with plans to cut them all off once the inheritance is official. With that, all the guests have a motive.

== Characters ==
- Mr. John Boddy: The heir to the mansion and archaeological hobbyist. He recently discovered a steady "trickle" of allowances from his uncle's estate to the colourful characters, and plans to put an end to it all.
- Mrs. Blanche White: His faithful maid and terrible cook who has little to show for her years of dedicated service. She lives at the mansion in exchange for her services.
- Mrs. Patricia Peacock: The thrice widowed mother of Miss Scarlet, who is running out of her most recently deceased husband's money faster than she can handle. Her three husbands - James Scarlet, Ernest Zaffer and Sir Matthew Peacock, all seem to have died of mysterious, yet similar circumstances.
- Miss Josephine Scarlet: The seductive and attractive daughter of Mrs Peacock; their relationship is angry and bitter. An aspiring (yet woefully untalented) actress with a fondness for rich, yet older widowers.
- Colonel Michael Mustard: A 'gallant' war hero whose medals are a matter of question. Impoverished and hounded by tax collectors and creditors, he needs money, and fast.
- Mr. John Green (AKA Reverend Green): A man of God, despite not finishing seminary, he is suspected to be involved in fraud, theft and money laundering.
- Professor Peter Plum: A brilliant mind, now dimming, he was recently fired from the British Museum after there was a possible question about his writings, and the sudden "vanishing" of his old rival.

== Book format ==
Mr. Boddy is murdered at some point in every chapter, only to re-appear—and be murdered again in the next, almost as if that mystery stands alone. Each mystery is a different version of the main plot, Mr. Boddy's murder, unlike the original series. The murderer and motive changes for each story. Compared to the 1990 series, these stories are more complex, filled with more dialogue and Britishisms, such as "post". Only two books were made.
