= Burns and Porter =

Defunct pub quiz business

Burns & Porter was a business in the United Kingdom that prepared and distributed pub quizzes. In 1976, Sharon Burns and Tom Porter founded and organised 32 pub quiz teams in three leagues in southern England. Burns and Porter travelled the country for the next few years, presenting their quizzes to breweries as a marketing strategy to bring customers to their pubs on slow evenings. Burns and Porter cornered the market in pub quizzes, with over 10,000 teams playing in one of their quizzes every week in the season, while the BBC and independent television companies tapped them for contestants and questions for television quiz shows. Three Burns & Porter Pub Quiz books were published. The company was awarded southern England's most efficient business in 1986, the award was sponsored by British Telecom PLC. In 1988, Burns & Porter was sold to Prism Leisure Corporation PLC. Sharon Burns remained as Managing Director of the company for two years. She now only does quizzes for charity whilst running her own property business and hobby vineyard called Sour Grapes, based in Michelmersh, Hampshire.

== History ==
Pub quizzes were played in some pubs mainly in the North of England. They were a popular activity, which took place mainly in the public bars of pubs, alongside other pub games such as darts and pool. They had little organisation, and would be held on a very localised and one off match basis.

== Origin ==
In 1975/6 a new partnership was formed between Sharon Burns and Tom Porter, whose objective was to get people into pubs on quiet trading nights, by creating entertainment that was inexpensive to put on and could be run across many outlets simultaneously. After much fact finding and debate, the first pub quiz leagues were formed with 32 teams who were fixtured to play against each other in three leagues, home and away matches, on Sunday nights throughout Hampshire and Dorset. Burns & Porter were responsible for sending question sets in sealed envelopes out to the pubs each week, and then collecting in the results each week, compiling up-to-date league tables and sending them to the teams.
