= Protmušis =

Lithuanian quiz event

The logo of Protmušis.

Protmušis (lit. 'Mindfight') was a team pub quiz-type game that takes place in Vilnius, Lithuania. The organisers and participants of Protmušis are mainly students from various universities in Vilnius. It was first organized in 1997.

It was the first non-televised quiz game to be popularized in Lithuania.

All major universities of Vilnius participated in Protmušis (including all the faculties of Vilnius University, some faculties of Vilnius Gediminas Technical University, Mykolas Romeris University, Vilnius Academy of Fine Arts, ISM University of Management and Economics and the Vilnius Pedagogical University) as well as the Kaunas University of Technology and Vytautas Magnus University of Kaunas and the Stockholm School of Economics in Riga; in addition, some people who had already graduated and those who are not yet studying in universities take or were taking part in the competition as well.

== Rules ==
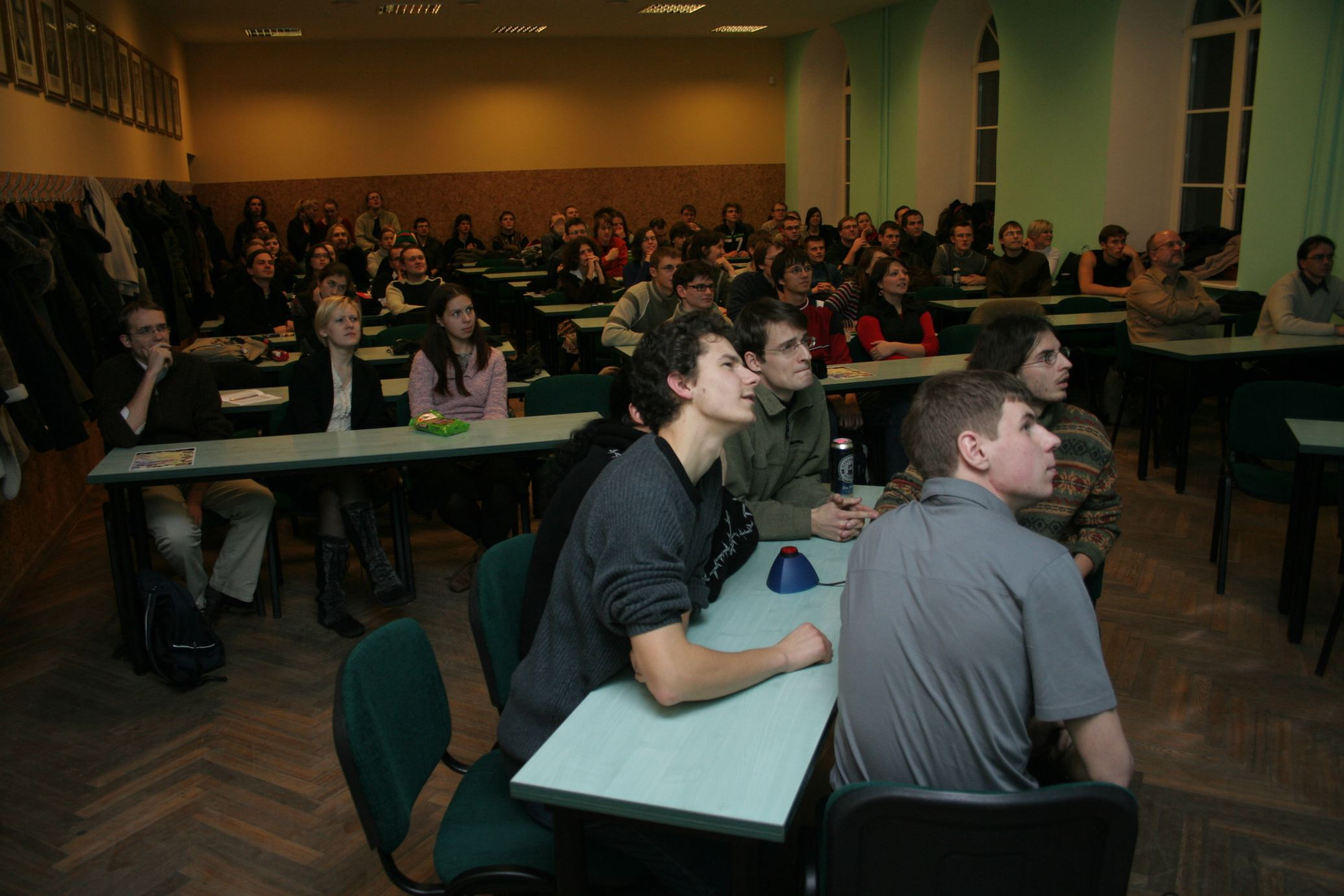
A match of Protmušis. One of the teams and the spectators are visible, the opposing team is to the right.

Traditionally, a match of Protmušis involves two teams playing against each other. At any given moment no less than three and not more than five people could play for a single team. During the match ten pre-prepared questions are shown on a large screen in the front of the hall with a one-minute timer. During that one minute players are permitted to discuss fellow members of their team. Teams buzz in to stop the timer and answer. If the referee accepts the answer as correct, the full answer is shown on the screen and the team is awarded a point. If not, the one-minute timer is restarted and the other team is permitted to continue searching for the answer. The team that has more points after all ten questions are read is declared the winner. If both teams have an equal number of points at that time, the match ends in a draw. A draw is only possible in the regular season; if such a situation occurs during the playoffs, an overtime is played: additional questions are presented to the teams until the first correct answer is given - at that point the team which answered correctly is declared to be the winner.

A team of Protmušis is deliberating before attempting to answer the question.

The semi-finals and finals feature 12 and 15 questions respectively rather than 10.

== System of the championship ==
Every year two championships (seasons) are held, each one lasting for approximately four months (one in the winter and spring and one in the autumn and winter; the seasons are separated by the winter and summer holidays and the student exams).

Each season consists of the regular season and the playoffs. In the regular season all the participating teams are put into groups. All teams in the same group has to play against each other. During these games, the winning team is given two points, and both teams are given one point each for a draw. The number of groups and the number of teams in each group as well as the number of teams advancing to playoffs depend on how many teams participate in Protmušis that particular season, therefore, the system varies somewhat from season to season. In some seasons some matches are played by three teams rather than two.

The "cup" of Protmušis (actually a glass brain) that is awarded to the champions.

In addition to the main championship, various smaller games are being held: when neither of the playing teams answer the question correctly the spectators of Protmušis are permitted to give a try (the spectators who answered the most questions are being listed in the official website), the best questions are voted for and the spectators and players who had created the most questions are named, all the players and spectators are asked additional questions where it is possible to win special prizes.

At present Protmušis is held each Thursday at 18:30 (Vilnius time) in the great hall of the Faculty of the Natural Sciences of Vilnius University. Anybody (including non-players and non-students) is permitted to come and watch the games, try their luck in answering the questions that teams are unable to answer or to support the teams of their faculty or institute. Each Wednesday four matches are played (whole event of four matches lasts for approximately two hours). All the questions and answers during the game are presented in the Lithuanian language.

== Questions ==
An example of a question as presented on the screen during the Protmušis matches. The question reads: "Probably Mary was the only elephant hanged in world history. This happened on September 13, 1916 in Erwin, Tennessee. Why was she hanged?"

The questions that are presented in the Protmušis games requires both general knowledge and the ability to think logically. They might be related to various fields (such as history, geography, arts, physics, biology, politics, sports, chemistry and so on), but may not require a very specific knowledge in those fields. Usually, the questions are about more or less minor topics that are not known to most people, but after thinking logically it is possible to guess the answer based on one's general knowledge about various similar more important subjects. The goal of a good Protmušis question is to make it so that nobody would answer it immediately, but the team members would need to discuss among themselves and only after each member said his/her suggestions or thoughts regarding the question it would be possible to find the best answer. The number of questions that are answered correctly by the teams per each match varies greatly (from 10% when the weaker teams play to 90% when the major teams face each other), but usually the teams are able to find the correct answer for approximately 50%-60% of the questions.

Each question, as is shown on the screen, consists of two slides, one for question and one for answer. The question slide usually includes introduction that is meant both to help find out the answer to the question and to describe the subject more, and the question itself. The answer slide includes a detailed explanation of the answer. The goal of Protmušis is not only to entertain but to expand the knowledge of the players and the spectators as well, therefore, the questions that are related to interesting subjects that are not widely known to the general public, but are worth to be known, are especially valued. Both the question slide and the answer slide are usually illustrated with pictures related to the subject.

Everybody (both players and spectators) is permitted to send in the questions for Protmušis (the questions are not presented during the matches of the team of the player who had created the question).

== History ==
Protmušis was organised for the first time in 1997. The game is based on 1990s Soviet game Brain ring (Russian: Брэйн-ринг). It was organized regularly, two seasons a year, between 2003 and 2014.

The technology improved over time (for example, special buttons are now used by the teams to express their will to attempt answer the question; prior to the fifth season lamps were used instead and in the 1997 it was simple hand raising), the number of organisers and the question authors have increased. Protmušis found many sponsors (such as Vaga, one of the biggest publishing houses in Lithuania) and therefore prizes are given now. The official internet website and forums were established and had improved, Protmušis was featured many times in the student press. In the autumn of 2006, Protmušis was also featured in the Sostinė supplement of the leading Lithuanian newspaper Lietuvos Rytas and on the Lithuanian national television (LRT). In the spring of 2006 the cooperation of Protmušis and the International Quizzing Association started and the Lithuanian branch of the World Quizzing Championships 2006 was organised using the organisational basis of Protmušis. In December 2006 during the European Quizzing Championships in Paris, a demonstration of Protmušis was given, introducing the gameplay to other European nations. In 2008 an article on Protmušis was published in daily newspaper 15 min.

Kastytis Beitas was one of the cofounders, who died in 2015.

In addition to the official championships, unofficial matches and mini-tournaments have been held. These included demonstration games and special games (that have been organised as a part of some bigger scientific, educational or entertainment events). The rules and questions might differ slightly during unofficial matches (for example, in matches that are organised as a part of some event the questions might all be set in accordance to the topic of the event).

Each team may consist of five to eight players (no more than five players could play for the team in a match at any given time however). Some teams are participating for many years (there are players who have participated in every season since 1997). Each season at least several new teams registers for participation. Many teams represent some particular faculty or institute, while other teams are mixed.
