= Thomas Hochstettler =

American academic administrator

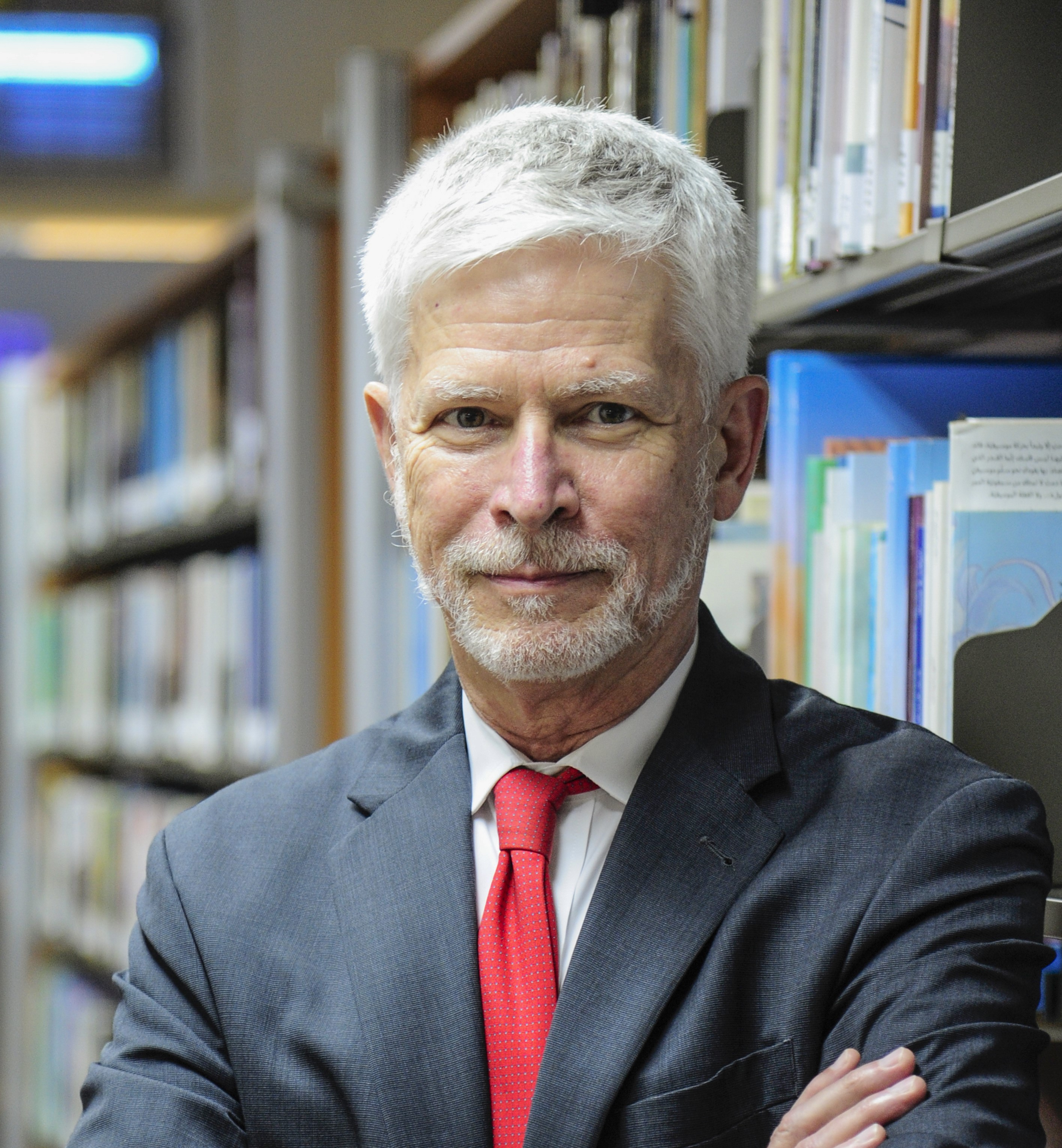

Thomas John Glas Hochstettler is the current president of Acacia University and a higher education consultant. He previously served as the twenty-third president of Lewis & Clark College in Portland, Oregon. He took office in August 2004 as the successor to Michael Mooney. He served in that capacity until 2009 when he became Provost at the American University of Sharjah in the United Arab Emirates. He subsequently held leadership positions at the Petroleum Institute in Abu Dhabi and as a Commissioner in the UAE Ministry of Education. He was subsequently appointed Provost at Abu Dhabi University. Before joining Lewis & Clark, Hochstettler served as Founding Vice President for Academic Affairs at International University Bremen, now Constructor University in Bremen, Germany. He has held academic appointments and administrative positions at Stanford University, Bowdoin College, and Rice University.

== Education ==
Hochstettler attended Earlham College, where he received his Bachelor of Arts in history in 1969. In 1970, he received his M.A. in History from the University of Michigan and completed his Ph.D. in Early Modern German History there in 1980. At Michigan, he was a Woodrow Wilson National Fellow, a Ford Foundation grant recipient, and a Stipendiat of the Deutscher Akademischer Austauschdienst. He studied under James Allen Vann, III, Gerhard Weinberg, John Shy, and David Bien at Michigan, and subsequently he pursued studies in finance at the Haas School of Business at the University of California, Berkeley.

== Career ==
In 1996, Rice University in Houston, Texas, tapped Hochstettler to become Associate Provost under President S. Malcolm Gillis and Provost David H. Auston. In 1999, Rice seconded Hochstettler to the city-state of Bremen, Germany, to consult on the founding of International University Bremen, now Constructor University. He served there until 2004 as founding Vice President for Academic Affairs. In 2021, it was incorporated into the Swiss Schaffhausen Institute of Technology as a center for advanced research and learning in technology and engineering.

In 2004, Lewis & Clark College in Portland, Oregon, called Hochstettler to serve as its 23rd President. Close ties between Lewis & Clark and its alumni in the Middle East prompted him in 2009 to accept the position of Provost and Professor of History at the American University of Sharjah in the United Arab Emirates. He led the University as Acting Chancellor for two years. In 2014, he was called to head of the Abu Dhabi energy research organization, the Petroleum Institute, where he was instrumental in facilitating the merger of the Institute with the public Khalifa University in 2017. Following a stint as a Commissioner in the UAE Ministry of Education, he moved in 2020 into the role of Provost at Abu Dhabi University.

Hochstettler has served on several boards, including chairing the Oregon World Affairs Council. He served on and chaired the Board of the Washington-based International Student Exchange Program, ISEP, for several years. In the UAE, he serves on the Executive Committee of the Abu Dhabi International Petroleum Energy Conference, ADIPEC. Hochstettler was also an original signatory of the Amethyst Initiative in 2008 that advocates for responsible policies at colleges and universities regarding student access to alcohol.
