= Good Job, Brain! =

Quiz show and trivia podcast

- Language: English

Cast and voices
- Hosted by: Karen Chu; Colin Felton; Dana Nelson (through September 2022); Chris Kohler

Production
- Length: 45 minutes–1 hour

Technical specifications
- Audio format: MP3

Publication
- No. of episodes: 262
- Original release: 2012
- Updates: weekly (through 2016); sporadically 2017–July 2018; weekly (starting April 2021)

Good Job, Brain!, also known as GJB! for short, is a quiz show and offbeat trivia podcast. Good Job, Brain! began as a Kickstarter project on December 20, 2011. It is distributed on Stitcher, SoundCloud, iTunes, Spotify, and the show's website.

The show's cast play pub trivia together as a team called Baby Dog Time, named for hostess Karen Chu's dog.

The cast wrote a book, Good Job, Brain!: Trivia, Quizzes and More Fun From the Popular Pub Quiz Podcast, published in September 2016.

The show went on hiatus in 2018 and returned on April 26, 2021, for a 10 episode Season 2.

== Format ==
Generally, the program begins with "Pop Quiz, Hotshot", in which Karen reads questions from one randomly chosen Trivial Pursuit card. Most episodes are themed where the hosts prepare trivia and quizzes related to the theme. Every fifth episode is an "All Quiz Bonanza" where each host prepares a non-themed trivia quiz. A podcast listener wrote an "Um, Actually" jingle for Good Job, Brain!.

== Recurring segments ==
- "Um, Actually" – Listener-submitted corrections of facts from previous episodes.
- "Pop Quiz Hotshot" – Episodic general trivia from Trivial Pursuit cards.
- "Brad Pitt or Lasers" – Segment in which players guess the older of two objects, the starting (i.e. Brad Pitt or Lasers)
- "Belgium or Not-Belgium" – Players guess if an object is from Belgium or not.
- "E.L.V.I.S. the robot" – Segment in which players guess the song that the original Macintosh text-to-speech speaks the lyrics to.
- "William Fakespeare" – A fake impersonator of William Shakespeare reads lyrics to pop songs in Elizabethan English, through which players have to translate and guess the song the impersonator is reciting.

== Awards and media ==
Good Job, Brain! was the winner of Stitcher's 2013 "Best Games + Hobbies" podcast. It was named one of The Guardian's "Top 10 US podcasts for road trip listening" in 2013.

== Episodes ==
Episode No.	Title	Date	Running Time
1	"Candy is Dandy but Liquor is Quicker"	April 3, 2012	44:30
2	"Once Upon a Gruesome Time"	December 3, 2012	48:44
3	"You Want Truffle Fries With That?"	March 19, 2012	52:47
4	"Thomas Butt-Headison and Other Invention Tales"	March 26, 2012	48:48
5	"ALL QUIZ BONANZA!"	February 4, 2012	43:14
6	"Word Nerds Rejoice!"	September 4, 2012	51:40
7	"Willy Wonka & The Wax Tadpole Factory"	April 16, 2012	49:42
8	"Very Superstitious..."	April 23, 2012	48:15
9	"Finger Lickin' Good"	April 30, 2012	49:08
10	"Animals Are Weird"	July 5, 2012	48:10
11	"Hey, Your Fly is Open"	May 14, 2012	47:39
12	"ALL QUIZ BONANZA! #2"	May 30, 2012	47:44
13	"It's a Monster Mash!"	May 28, 2012	50:38
14	"You Betcha, Dollface"	March 6, 2012	47:54
15	"ALL QUIZ BONANZA! #3"	November 6, 2012	39:39
16	"Don't You...Forget About Me"	June 18, 2012	44:53
17	"Off With Their Heads"	June 25, 2012	52:03
18	"Splish Splash I Was Taking A Bath"	February 7, 2012	46:45
19	"The Most Important Meal of the Day"	September 7, 2012	45:39
20	"ALL QUIZ BONANZA! #4"	July 16, 2012	44:13
21	"Plants Are Messed Up"	July 23, 2012	53:04
22	"DO NOT PASS GO"	July 30, 2012	49:22
23	"I'll Drink to That"	June 8, 2012	41:12
24	"OMGlympics!"	August 13, 2012	46:21
25	"ALL QUIZ BONANZA! #5"	August 20, 2012	42:17
26	"Where in the World is..."	August 27, 2012	40:29
27	"Ticket to Ride"	March 9, 2012	43:28
28	"We're All a Little Looney"	October 9, 2012	44:45
29	"Domo Arigato, Mr. Roboto"	September 17, 2012	46:27
30	"ALL QUIZ BONANZA! #6"	January 10, 2012	47:02
31	"Color Me Bad!"	February 10, 2012	47:29
32	"Ugh, It's Just a Fad"	October 15, 2012	47:02
33	"Have You Seen My Stapler?"	October 22, 2012	46:14
34	"ALL QUIZ BONANZA! #7"	October 29, 2012	39:18
35	"I WANT CANDY"	May 11, 2012	47:43
36	"Happiest Podcast On Earth"	November 13, 2012	47:11
37	"Hold Your Tongue!"	November 19, 2012	41:03
38	"The Man Show"	November 26, 2012	48:02
39	"Smell You Later"	March 12, 2012	47:50
40	"ALL QUIZ BONANZA! #8"	October 12, 2012	42:42
41	"Celebrity Secretttsssss"	December 17, 2012	45:48
42	"Season's Eatings!"	December 24, 2012	46:09
43	"Our Favorite Things"	December 31, 2012	45:24
44	"BEST OF 2012"	July 1, 2013	53:03
44b	"Fun-Size Mini Show"	January 14, 2013	7:36
45	"ALL QUIZ BONANZA! #9"	January 21, 2013	44:51
46	"Baby, It's Cold Outside"	January 21, 2013	42:09
47	"Zzzzzzzz..."	February 28, 2013	47:05
48	"Sports Trivia for Non-Sports People"	April 2, 2013	46:02
49	"LOL"	December 2, 2013	50:37
50	"ALL QUIZ BONANZA #10"	February 18, 2013	39:15
51	"Oh What a Circus"	February 25, 2013	45:31
52	"Trivia About Trivia"	April 3, 2013	49:11
53	"Take A Bite Outta Crime"	November 3, 2013	49:16
54	"Epic Fail"	March 19, 2013	46:24
55	"ALL QUIZ BONANZA! #11"	March 26, 2013	43:16
56	"Your Body is a Wonderland"	February 4, 2013	50:14
57	"Fake It Till You Make It"	September 4, 2013	44:39
58	"Hey Ladies!"	April 16, 2013	49:35
59	"Creepy Crawlies"	April 23, 2013	40:41
60	"ALL QUIZ BONANZA! #12"	April 30, 2013	47:24
60b	"Fun-Size Mini Show: William Fakespeare"	July 5, 2013	5:02
61	"Waking Up is Hard to Do"	May 15, 2013	49:17
62	"So Fresh, So Clean"	May 21, 2013	49:48
63	"It's A-MAIZE-ing!"	May 28, 2013	43:23
64	"Itsy Bitsy, Teenie Weenie"	May 6, 2013	47:17
65	"ALL QUIZ BONANZA! #13"	December 6, 2013	49:29
66	"All By Myself"	June 18, 2013	42:38
67	"Bad Medicine"	June 25, 2013	42:38
68	"Fun in the Sun"	February 7, 2013	54:59
69	"The Sound of Music"	September 7, 2013	55:50
70	"Go Big or Go Home"	July 16, 2013	51:51
71	"ALL QUIZ BONANZA! #14"	July 23, 2013	48:43
72	"We're Goin' Under"	July 31, 2013	48:15
73	"Lie, Cheat, and Steal"	July 8, 2013	51:34
74	"Sequels II: Sequel Harder 2 The Streets"	August 13, 2013	44:48
75	"ALL QUIZ BONANZA! #15"	August 20, 2013	54:38
76	"Hey, Hot Stuff"	August 28, 2013	45:50
77	"You're My Number One"	May 9, 2013	46:30
78	"Too Cool for School"	October 9, 2013	50:49
79	"Too Much of a Good Thing"	September 17, 2013	44:23
80	"ALL QUIZ BONANZA! #16"	September 25, 2013	44:48
81	"Danger! Danger!"	January 10, 2013	49:05
82	"Body Hackin'"	September 10, 2013	51:10
82b	"Fun-Size Mini Show: Live from Chris' Wedding! (And He Doesn't Know Because It's a Surprise)"	October 15, 2013	19:54
83	"Up in the Air"	October 23, 2013	46:47
84	"Happy Halloween!"	October 29, 2013	47:28
85	"ALL QUIZ BONANZA! #17"	May 11, 2013	50:20
86	"The Life Aquatic"	December 11, 2013	47:42
87	"The Truth About Cats and Dogs"	November 19, 2013	45:58
88	"Oh Behave!"	November 26, 2013	47:17
89	"Sock It to Me"	March 12, 2013	46:36
90	"ALL QUIZ BONANZA! #18"	November 12, 2013	41:08
91	"Let's Get Physical"	December 17, 2013	48:01
92	"Pick a Side"	December 24, 2013	54:53
93	"BEST OF 2013"	December 31, 2013	1:21:54
93b	"Fun-Size Mini Show: HAPPY NEW YEAR!"	July 1, 2014	16:07
94	"A Berry Good Episode"	January 16, 2014	49:47
95	"ALL QUIZ BONANZA! #19"	January 22, 2014	50:42
96	"Chillin' Like A Villain"	January 29, 2014	48:28
97	"BYOT (Bring Your Own Topic)"	May 2, 2014	56:26
98	"Viva Las Vegas! Part I"	November 2, 2014	50:55
99	"Viva Las Vegas Part II"	February 18, 2014	51:43
100	"100!"	May 3, 2014	1:21:58
101	"Um, Actually..."	December 3, 2014	56:59
102	"The Need For Speed"	March 19, 2014	56:48
103	"In Yo Face!"	March 26, 2014	48:05
104	"Fooled Ya"	January 4, 2014	48:24
105	"ALL QUIZ BONANZA! #21"	September 4, 2014	49:31
106	"Life of the Party"	April 15, 2014	45:05
107	"Shop Til You Drop"	April 23, 2014	55:00
108	"Oh Baby!"	April 30, 2014	52:29
109	"It's Treasure-Hunting Time"	July 5, 2014	53:36
110	"ALL QUIZ BONANZA! #22"	May 14, 2014	50:27
111	"What's in a Name?"	May 21, 2014	51:29
112	"Cracking the Code"	May 29, 2014	53:33
113	"How to Prep for Pub Quiz Part I"	May 6, 2014	50:06
114	"How to Prep for Pub Quiz Part II"	November 6, 2014	42:11
115	"ALL QUIZ BONANZA! #23"	June 28, 2014	53:02
116	"Your Love is Like a Rollercoaster, Baby, Baby"	June 24, 2014	48:19
117	"We Love the 90s"	June 30, 2014	56:33
117b	"Fun-Size Mini Show: Music Puzzle Challenge!"	September 7, 2014	5:06
118	"It's Legen-DAIRY"	July 15, 2014	44:57
119	"All Around the World"	July 24, 2014	46:25
120	"ALL QUIZ BONANZA! #24"	July 31, 2014	49:13
121	"Dot Com"	June 8, 2014	51:45
122	"We Salute You!"	August 13, 2014	53:56
123	"At the Movies"	August 20, 2014	53:56
124	"Bootylicious"	August 28, 2014	45:19
125	"ALL QUIZ BONANZA! #25"	March 9, 2014	48:26
126	"I'll Take It To Go"	October 9, 2014	55:28
126b	"Fun-Size Mini Show: Bumper Contest!"	September 18, 2014	2:42
127	"The Great Outdoors"	September 26, 2014	57:35
128	"Eat Your Veggies!"	January 10, 2014	49:13
129	"Father of Mine"	September 10, 2014	48:53
130	"ALL QUIZ BONANZA! #26"	October 16, 2014	53:20
131	"Bibliotheque Discotheque"	October 23, 2014	48:53
132	"Happy Halloween! #2"	October 31, 2014	55:23
133	"That Old Time Rock and Roll"	July 11, 2014	56:29
134	"For Your Safety"	November 15, 2014	52:11
135	"ALL QUIZ BONANZA! #27"	November 21, 2014	49:57
136	"Raise Your Voice"	November 28, 2014	51:44
137	"All in the Family"	May 12, 2014	56:17
138	"Abracadabra"	December 12, 2014	54:23
139	"Season's Eatings II"	December 22, 2014	48:49
140	"ALL QUIZ BONANZA! #28 Holiday Edition!"	December 25, 2014	43:46
141	"Best of 2014"	June 2, 2015	1:34:46
142	"Don't Call it a COMEBACK!"	June 2, 2015	52:10
143	"A Royal Pain"	February 18, 2015	57:07
144	"Mascot Mania"	February 25, 2015	1:01:51
145	"ALL QUIZ BONANZA! #29"	July 3, 2015	57:57
146	"It's a Date!"	March 17, 2015	47:33
147	"The Doctor is In"	March 27, 2015	50:09
148	"Take Out the Trash"	May 4, 2015	59:17
149	"Collect All the Things!"	November 4, 2015	55:33
150	"ALL QUIZ BONANZA! #30"	April 18, 2015	44:30
151	"Cheers!"	April 30, 2015	1:00:01
152	"Follow the Leader"	May 15, 2015	51:10
153	"Let There Be Light"	May 6, 2015	56:39
154	"To Boldly Go"	June 14, 2015	53:02
154b	"Fun-Size Mini Show: Music Location Puzzle"	June 23, 2015	23:31
155	"ALL QUIZ BONANZA! #31"	May 7, 2015	59:56
156	"Fantastical Food"	July 16, 2015	57:23
157	"Beautiful in Every Way"	July 28, 2015	58:41
158	"Sweeping Epics"	October 8, 2015	57:30
159	"Na na na na na na na na na na na na na na na na... BATMAN!"	August 26, 2015	1:03:49
160	"ALL QUIZ BONANZA #32!"	April 9, 2015	52:40
161	"Slippery When Wet"	September 18, 2015	1:07:37
162	"New Slang"	January 10, 2015	58:13
163	"GJB LIVE!"	September 10, 2015	51:31
164	"What the Folk?"	October 19, 2015	59:57
165	"ALL QUIZ BONANZA! #33"	October 29, 2015	50:19
166	"Nuzzle in Puzzles"	October 11, 2015	1:01:20
167	"What's Your Guilty Pleasure?"	November 30, 2015	1:02:30
168	"It Takes Two"	December 15, 2015	1:00:02
169	"Too Cute!"	December 22, 2015	49:17
170	"ALL QUIZ BO-HO-HO-NANZA!"	December 24, 2015	1:04:47
171	"BEST OF 2015 (Cheesy Awards Show Edition)"	April 1, 2016	1:34:12
172	"Catch Up! Listener Challenge, Puffy Snakes, Xenografts"	January 24, 2016	32:50
173	"A Sticky Situation"	April 2, 2016	53:18
174	"Whoops!"	February 14, 2016	56:11
175	"ALL QUIZ BONANZA! #35"	February 20, 2016	1:02:56
176	"Lost in Translation"	July 3, 2016	1:05:04
177	"FIGHT!!!"	March 21, 2016	1:02:04
178	"Spy vs. Spy"	March 31, 2016	1:07:42
180	"ALL QUIZ BONANZA! #36"	April 13, 2016	1:10:51
181	"Good Job, BRAIN!"	September 5, 2016	48:33
182	"Dress You Up"	May 22, 2016	1:01:54
183	"Eyes on the Prize"	July 6, 2016	1:04:15
184	"Spice Up Your Life"	June 18, 2016	56:19
185	"ALL QUIZ BONANZA! #37"	June 28, 2016	57:48
186	"Eggsellent"	September 7, 2016	1:04:28
187	"BANNED"	July 16, 2016	53:46
188	"BFFs"	July 8, 2016	55:37
189	"The Golden Touch"	August 15, 2016	1:03:56
190	"ALL QUIZ BONANZA! #38"	October 19, 2016	55:49
191	"I'm FALLing and I Can't Get Up"	November 18, 2016	56:56
192	"Teamwork Makes the Dream Work"	November 29, 2016	52:52
193	"Under the Sea"	February 19, 2017	1:00:07
194	"Gimme a Break"	August 3, 2017	59:05
195	"ALL QUIZ BONANZA! #39"	March 24, 2017	1:03:00
196	"We Could Be Heroes"	November 4, 2017	1:04:00
197	"Let's Make a Deal"	February 6, 2017	1:14:00
198	"High and Dry"	June 22, 2017	1:09:07
199	"Bring on the FANfare!"	May 17, 2018	1:09:42
200	"ALL QUIZ BONANZA! #40"	May 24, 2018	1:18:17
201	"You Know, For Kids!"	April 6, 2018	57:19
202	"This is Only A Test"	June 15, 2018	1:02:21
203	"The Great Escape"	June 28, 2018	1:07:26
204	"Go West"	October 7, 2018	1:03:33
205	"ALL QUIZ BONANZA! #41"	April 26, 2021	1:01:15
205b	"Fun-Size Mini Show: Welcome Back, Trotter"	April 26, 2021	29:37
206	"Internationally Known"	May 3, 2021	51:54
207	"A Hobby a Day Keeps the Doldrums Away"	May 10, 2021	1:03:25
208	"Lock It Down!"	May 1, 2021	1:06:25
209	"Have You Tried Rebooting It?"	May 24, 2021	56:36
210	"ALL QUIZ BONANZA! #42"	May 31, 2021	1:04:40
211	"In Full Bloom"	June 7, 2021	56:03
212	"Remember Me?"	June 16, 2021	52:24
213a	"Bonus Episode: Being on a Game Show 101"	June 23, 2021	49:09
213	"Watch Party"	June 23, 2021	1:00:02
214	"There’s No Place Like Home"	June 30, 2021	56:13
215	"ALL QUIZ BONANZA! #43"	October 19, 2021	1:12:04
216	"Happy Halloween! #3"	October 26, 2021	1:03:56
217	"It's the Cat's Meow!"	November 2, 2021	52:54
218	"Are Your Worth Your Salt?"	November 9, 2021	1:05:08
219	"Special - Escape This Pub Quiz"	November 16, 2021	1:05:26
220	"ALL QUIZ BONANZA! #44"	November 23, 2021	1:17:07
221	"It's Another One for the Books"	November 30, 2021	1:06:35
222a	"Bonus Episode: Escape Rooms with Laura E. Hall!"	December 17, 2021	44:03
222	"It Takes Two 2"	December 7, 2021	1:04:50
223	"Braving the Elements"	December 14, 2021	1:01:28
224	"Today is a Gift, That's Why It’s Called "The Present""	December 21, 2021	1:06:37
225	"ALL QUIZ BONANZA! #45"	March 8, 2022	1:01:25
226	"The Power of Ten"	March 15, 2022	1:06:42
227	"Seeing Red"	March 22, 2022	1:14:30
228	"Lock and Key"	March 29, 2022	1:09:23
229	"Let's Get Loud"	April 5, 2022	1:07:49
230	"ALL QUIZ BONANZA! #46"	April 12, 2022	1:13:48
231	"In Circles"	April 19, 2022	1:09:16
232	"Dirt Off Your Shoulder"	April 26, 2022	1:00:34
233	"Some Friendly Competition"	May 3, 2022	1:20:16
234	"SPECIAL - Lost Episode From the Vault"	May 10, 2022	1:07:51
235	"ALL QUIZ BONANZA! #47"	September 13, 2022	1:07:42
236	"It's Hip to Be Square"	September 20, 2022	1:02:31
237	"Good Morning, Brain!"	September 27, 2022	52:07
238	"[REDACTED]"	October 4, 2022	58:03
239	"Accessories Pull It All Together"	October 11, 2022	59:00
240	"ALL QUIZ BONANZA! #48"	October 18, 2022	1:18:36
241	"Halloween Clips Spooktacular"	October 25, 2022	1:03:47
242	"Crashing the Party"	November 1, 2022	1:00:51
243	"Sit Back and Relax"	November 8, 2022	59:09
244	"It’s a Switcheroo"	November 15, 2022	1:09:49
245	"ALL QUIZ BONANZA! #49"	March 14, 2023	1:07:42
246	"Signed, Sealed, Delivered"	March 21, 2023	58:42
247	"Rooting for the Underdog"	March 28, 2023	1:01:07
248	"You’re Embarrassing Me!"	April 4, 2023	1:02:56
249	"Make No Bones About It"	April 11, 2023	1:05:09
250	"ALL QUIZ BONANZA! #50"	April 18, 2023	1:15:26
251	"Summer, Summer, Summertime"	April 25, 2023	1:08:26
252	"When We Were Young"	May 2, 2023	59:52
253	"Going Green"	May 9, 2023	1:02:21
254	"We’re Going on a Road Trip"	May 16, 2023	1:11:38
255	"ALL QUIZ BONANZA! #51"	September 29, 2023	59:55
256	"Flat Out"	October 3, 2023	1:12:39
257	"We Got Beef"	October 10, 2023	56:47
258	"The Hole Truth"	October 17, 2023	1:02:58
259	"The Currency Exchange"	October 24, 2023	1:04:12
260	"ALL QUIZ BONANZA! #52 + Sporclecon"	October 31, 2023	1:06:54
261	"Picture This!"	November 7, 2023	56:56
262	"Winter is Coming"	November 14, 2023	1:01:08
