= Cluster Exploratory =

Cluster Exploratory (CluE) was a proposed 2008 U.S. National Science Foundation-funded program to use Google-IBM cluster technology to analyze massive amounts of data to search for patterns, part of the Academic Cluster Computing Initiative (ACCI). "The cluster will consist of 1,600 processors, several terabytes of memory, and hundreds of terabytes of storage, along with the software, including IBM's Tivoli and open source versions of Google File System and MapReduce". Google and IBM announced the first pilot phase of the ACCI in October 2007. The program ended in 2011, according to Google. NSF's call for proposals has been "archived".
