= Sploofus =

Entertainment website

- Website type: Trivia, Online games
- Available in: English
- Owner: Justin Morton
- Creator: Justin Morton
- Website: http://www.sploofus.com
- Commercial: Yes
- Registration: Optional (required for gameplay and submitting content)
- Launched: 2004
- Current status: Offline (May 2017)

Website logo

Sploofus was a website from 2004 to 2017 that featured trivia quizzes and other online games. Its basic content was free, with two paying levels were available as well.

Trivia quizzes would be submitted by site members and checked by one of 28 site editors before going live. WordPuzzles (similar to the game hangman) were written by both editors and paying players. Trivia Question(s) of the Day would be randomly selected for each player from a large database of questions created by the editorial staff and submitted by the editors. WordRounds and WordMatches designed to test vocabulary knowledge and dexterity were created by an independent third party for the webmaster.

Base play was free or players could upgrade to one of two paying levels: Gold, which stopped pop-ups and outside advertising and allowed for twice-daily play of the WordPuzzles; and Platinum, which allowed players to write WordPuzzles and submit trivia questions/quizzes.

Players could challenge members who were directly above them in the (total point) ranking to a Showdown. If the challenger won, (s)he would win points and the member challenged would break even. If the challenger lost, (s)he would lose points while the member challenged would break even. Additionally, wagers allowed every player to bet any number of points up to a predetermined maximum based on 25% of that player's point total. Players would gain or forfeit that wager depending on whether they won or lost.

The Sploofus site was created by Justin Morton in 2004 and grew to a membership of more than 67,000 members by November 2009. Morton formed Sploofus, Corp LLC in November 2006 in Michigan. Sploofus.com went offline in June 2010 without notice, but a new version of the site, called "Sploofus Island", began to appear in November 2010. This version allowed no interaction and had no game play capability. It went down in March 2011 when the original Sploofus announced that it was returning in April 2011 under new management. The site returned in its original (pre-Island) state on April 20, 2011. Sploofus.com was worth an estimated $34,800 in 2012. The website's quality began declining in 2014 with the site going down with increasing frequency (once because management accidentally allowed the domain registration to expire), features not being maintained, and players experiencing connection errors. Sploofus shutdown for good in May 2017.
