= Clue (book series) =

Books based upon the Cluedo/Clue franchise

The Clue series is a book series of 18 children's books published throughout the 1990s based on the board game Clue. The books are compilations of mini-mysteries that the reader must solve involving various crimes committed at the home of Reginald Boddy by six of his closest "friends".

== Format ==
Each book begins with a small chapter where Mr Boddy introduces himself to the reader. He explains the situation and introduces the six suspects. This ends with some kind of cliffhanger that leads into the first chapter.

Except for the first book, which contains thirteen mysteries, all the books contain ten mini-mysteries similar to the Encyclopedia Brown books. Each mystery ends with a question to answer, and a picture of the checklist from the game is provided to assist with solving. The answer is printed upside-down on the next page, providing an explanation of how the criminal was foiled, or how the victim (if there was one) survived. The first nine mysteries typically involve some sort of competition between the guests (in which case readers must deduce who won), a guest attempting to murder another guest, or some sort of rare treasure of Mr Boddy's that has been stolen. Deduction of the guilty party is done by tracking particular oddities given specific to the mystery, such as the guests all trying on specific scents of perfume or a note that some are wearing a particular style or color of clothing. The guests also have very distinct, exaggerated personalities that betray their identities to the reader when they are not directly named.

Someone attempts to murder Mr Boddy in the final chapter of each book. In the solution, no explanation is given, and it is suggested that Mr Boddy actually dies. In the introduction of subsequent books, however, Mr Boddy explains how he survived the end of the previous book, with the exception of the eighteenth book. This allows the series to come to an end at any point without ending abruptly and also leaves it open for another book.

== Books ==
Except as noted, the original hardcover editions were published by Turtleback Press, and had four different authors. Later paperback reissues are credited "Book created by A.E. Parker", and are published by Scholastic Press. The series is currently out of print. ISBNs are for the paperback reissue.

1. Who Killed Mr. Boddy?, by Eric Weiner (1992) ISBN 0-590-46110-9
2. The Secret Secret Passage, by Eric Weiner (1992) ISBN 0-590-45631-8
3. The Case of the Invisible Cat, by Eric Weiner (1992) ISBN 0-590-45632-6
4. Mystery at the Masked Ball, by Eric Weiner (1993) ISBN 0-590-45633-4
5. Midnight Phone Calls, by Eric Weiner (1994) ISBN 0-590-47804-4
6. Booby-Trapped, by Jahnna N. Malcolm (1994) ISBN 0-590-47805-2
7. The Picture-Perfect Crime, by Jahnna N. Malcolm (1994) ISBN 0-590-48735-3
8. The Clue in the Shadows, by Jahnna N. Malcolm (1995) ISBN 0-590-48934-8
9. Mystery in the Moonlight, by Marie Jacks (1995) ISBN 0-590-48935-6
10. The Screaming Skeleton, by Marie Jacks (1995) ISBN 0-590-48936-4
11. Death by Candlelight, by Marie Jacks (1995) ISBN 0-590-62374-5
12. The Haunted Gargoyle, by Marie Jacks (1996) ISBN 0-590-62375-3
13. Revenge of the Mummy, by Marie Jacks (1996) ISBN 0-590-62376-1
14. The Dangerous Diamond, by Marie Jacks (1996) ISBN 0-590-62377-X
15. The Vanishing Vampire, by Marie Jacks (1996) ISBN 0-590-13742-5
16. Danger After Dark, by Dona Smith (1997) ISBN 0-590-13743-3
17. The Clue in the Crystal Ball, by Dona Smith (1997) ISBN 0-590-13744-1
18. Footprints in the Fog, by Dona Smith (1997) ISBN 0-590-13745-X

== Characters ==
With the exception of Mr. Boddy, the six central characters' faces were featured prominently on the back cover of each book, with three randomly selected to appear in an illustration created especially for the cover of each book. Books 1-4 feature the characters as they appeared in the 1986 edition of the board game. From Book 5 onwards, the character redesigns from the 1992 edition were used.

- Mr. Boddy is a wealthy philanthropist and a painfully trusting host. He collects valuable items while generously forgiving his guests for attempting to commit any crime, including theft, murdering each other and so even himself. His first name is said to be Reginald.
- Colonel Mustard is a military man with a short temper who constantly challenges the other guests to a duel (once even challenging himself). He is only shown fighting actual duels four times; three times with Mr. Green in the ballroom, library and ballroom again (The Secret Secret Passage, Midnight Phone Calls, Midnight Phone Calls) and once with Professor Plum in the dining room (The Haunted Gargoyle). His first name is said to be Martin.
- Professor Plum is an absent-minded jack-of-all-trades professor who constantly does things like steal something and forget why or create a poison and forget where he left the antidote. His first name is said to be Paul.
- Mr. Green is a businessman always interested in making easy money. He, too, has a short temper, often making threats and laughing at others' misfortunes. His first name is said to be Gerald.
- Mrs. Peacock is prim and proper, doing her best to spread social correctness amongst the other guests and scolding them when they are being rude. However, she is willing to kill or steal things to get her way.
- Miss Scarlet is a flirtatious young woman who likes to seduce, steal from, and murder people for money, revenge, etc. Her first name is said to be Charlotte.
- Mrs. White is Mr. Boddy's housekeeper and cook who constantly pretends to not take any offense to what someone said, only to immediately turn her back and scowl, thumb her nose, and do things of that nature. She will steal or kill to get herself away from housekeeping, but her plans always fail and she is forced to return as "Mr. Boddy's bitter cook". Her first name is said to be Wilhelmina.

== 2003 series ==
In 2003, Canadian mystery writer Vicki Cameron wrote a new set of mini-mysteries, the Clue Mysteries books, after the original author, Nigel Tappin, backed out of the project. Only two were published. Both books feature more complex storylines and vocabulary, fifteen mysteries apiece. The setting is at the fictional mansion Tudor Hall in Hampshire, Britain in 1926. The stories are formatted to be more like the game, with each mystery being about the murder of Boddy and featuring one guest conducting the entire investigation before accusing another guest of the crime.

== Clue puzzles ==
In 2008, a book called "CLUE" code breaking puzzles", was released.
