= Hostettler =

Hostettler is a surname. Notable people with the surname include:

- Irene Hostettler, Swiss cyclist
- John Hostettler (born 1961), American politician
- John Hostettler (1925–2018), English writer
- Matt Hostettler (born 1986), American politician

== See also ==
- Hostetler
