= Common Land Unit =

Smallest unit of land in land management

A Common Land Unit (CLU) is the smallest unit of land that has a permanent, contiguous boundary, a common land cover and land management, a common owner and a common producer in agricultural land associated with USDA farm programs. CLU boundaries are delineated from relatively permanent features such as fence lines, roads, and/or waterways.

== See also ==
- National Agriculture Imagery Program
