= Mexicargo =

IATA	ICAO	Call sign
GJ	MXC	Mexicargo
- Founded: August 18, 1991; 34 years ago
- Commenced operations: February 1996; 30 years ago
- Ceased operations: c.2000; 26 years ago
- Fleet size: See Historical fleet details below
- Destinations: See Company history below
- Headquarters: Mexico City, Mexico
- Key people: Marco Mediola (founder)

Mexicargo (IATA: GJ, ICAO: MXC, call sign: Mexicargo ) was a cargo airline based in Mexico City.

== Company history ==
Mexicargo was founded on August 18, 1991, by Marco Mediola and began flights in February 1996 using a Boeing 727-225F. The airline operated cargo flights between Mexico and the United States. It is unclear when the airline ceased operations, but the last two Boeing 707 were seen at Mexico City airport in 2000.

Cities served in 1997 were: Guadalajara, Hermosillo, La Paz (Baja California del Sur), Mexico City and Tijuana in Mexico. Miami and San Antonio in the United States.

== Historical fleet details ==
- 3 - Boeing 727-225F
- 1 - Boeing 707-323C
- 1 - Boeing 707-347C
- 1 - Douglas DC-9-15RC

not all aircraft were operated at the same time.
