= Ivan Clues =

Australian rules footballer

Personal information
- Full name: Ivan Noel Clues
- Born: 10 May 1929
- Died: 7 April 2004 (aged 74); Surry Hills, New South Wales
- Original team: Clifton Stars
- Height: 180 cm (5 ft 11 in)
- Weight: 82.5 kg (182 lb)

Playing career^{1}
Years	Club	Games (Goals)
1951	Collingwood	2 (0)
1952–56	Brunswick (VFA)	63 (94)
1957	Port Melbourne (VFA)	1 (2)
- ^{1} Playing statistics correct to the end of 1957.

Ivan Noel Clues (10 May 1929 – 7 April 2004) was an Australian rules footballer who played with Collingwood in the Victorian Football League (VFL).

Later in life, Clues moved to Mount Isa, where he worked at the Mount Isa Mines. He died in April 2004 in Surry Hills, New South Wales.
