= Clue (information) =

Useful piece of information

A clue or a hint is a piece of information bringing someone closer to a conclusion or which points to the right direction towards the solution. It is revealed either because it is discovered by someone who needs it or because it is shared (given) by someone else.

== Etymology ==
The word originally was an alternate of spelling of clew, which was defined as "a ball of thread". The word evolved to have its current meaning in part because of the common motif in mythology and folklore of using a ball of thread to aid in escaping a maze.

== Clues in crimes ==
Clues help solving crimes in a criminal investigation by using forensic science. They can be physical clues discovered on the crime scene, or discovered later during investigation by re-examining recorded evidence, or by interviewing witnesses, victims, or suspects.

In fiction, the fictional character Sherlock Holmes remains a great inspiration for forensic science, especially for the way his acute study of a crime scene yielded small clues as to the precise sequence of events. Clues were introduced to detective fiction by Arthur Conan Doyle's Holmes stories, and they remain a staple of the genre today.

== Clues in games ==
In some games, if a player is stuck on a puzzle or riddle, they can ask or pay for clues to help them progress in the game.

In some games, clues are an integral ludeme of the game mechanics, whereas in others they are considered cheats.

Clues in games or crosswords can either be given straight, be cryptic, be riddles, or contain contradictions. Clues can be intentionally misleading.

== Context clues ==
I don't understand enigmas. I never could guess a riddle in my life.
– Jane Eyre

— Charlotte Brontë, Jane Eyre (1847) chapter XIX, an example of the words "enigma" and "riddle" providing context clues.

When a reader encounters an unknown word or phrase in a text, context clues are anything in the text that helps them understand or guess the meaning of it. It can be synonyms, antonyms, explanations, examples, or familiar word-parts (prefix or suffix). It can be definitions, comparisons, or contrasts. Meaning can also be derived via descriptions of cause and effect or through inference.

A 1966 study identified fourteen types of context clues for native speakers. A 1971 study classified clues for second language readers into three categories: intra-lingual, inter-lingual and extra-lingual.

Giving a clue to a non-Jew is an exception to Rabbinically prohibited activities of Shabbat for Orthodox Jews, such as giving commands. For example, an observant Jewish person may say something like “The light is bothering me,” or “The Synagogue’s door is unlocked,” as hints to the Shabbat goy to fulfill their voluntary obligations.

== Clue words ==
In a conversation, clue words, can be used by a speaker to indicate to the listener which direction they are moving the conversation. Examples of clue words are "But anyway" and "Incidentally".

== See also ==
- Circumstantial evidence
- Cryptic crossword
- Ditloid
- Educated guess
- Inference
- Prosody (linguistics)
- Sudoku
