= Metaphysical detective story =

Genre of detective fiction

The metaphysical detective story is a literary genre of experimental fiction in the 20th century and has a complicated relationship with traditional detective stories. This literary genre raises in-depth issues about the characteristics of reality, interpretation, the limitations of knowledge, subjectivity, and narrative. In the history of modernist and postmodernist fictions, the metaphysical detective story plays a significant role in shaping the detective literary tradition, the literature in the 20th century, the postmodernist discourse, and the pop culture. The beginning of the metaphysical detective story is regarded as the mystery works written by Edgar Poe. Later writers such as Umberto Eco, Georges Perec, and Paul Auster are also typical authors of this genre. Meanwhile, this particular detective fiction genre has been criticized literarily in diverse approaches, though it keeps self-evolving.

== Definition ==
A metaphysical detective story is defined to be a subversive form of traditional detective-fiction conventions with the aim to question more in-depth and metaphysical issues, such as the mysteries of being and the transcendence of the mystery plot. A metaphysical detective story remains essential features of traditional detective stories, such as the detective's position as surrogate reader and the narrative closure. However, metaphysical detective stories go beyond such traditions in a “metaphysical” way, as its name suggests. By becoming highly self-reflexive, metaphysical detective stories particularly stress the importance of transcendence abstractly, compared to traditional detective texts.

Different authors give their respective definitions of metaphysical detective texts vividly by their own works. For example, Michael Holquist believes that a typical metaphysical detective story should not have "a neat ending". Instead, the ending of such stories needs to provoke further thoughts and be difficult to be forgotten. The crucial element to reach such an effect is to set insoluble mysteries. In the fiction "Murder in the Dark" written by Margaret Atwood, the ending features a permanent question: "do you believe me?" Such questions make the story more metaphysical.

Other scholars have provided even more specific definitions. For instance, Patricia Merivale believes that only the story in which “the detective hero himself becomes the murderer he has been seeking" can be a real metaphysical detective story. Such definitions admit the inability of detectives in the story and leave the mysterious problems to the readers. More precisely, a metaphysical detective story allows the readers to be detectives in the story, according to Kevin J. H. Dettmar.

== History and Evolution ==
The genre of metaphysical detective story started from the in-depth, philosophical, and literary detective fictions written by Poe early in the 1840s. Half a century later, Arthur Conan Doyle offered new perspectives to create metaphysical detective stories by written positivistic detection. These two authors represented the very beginning of the genre before the 20th century.

The metaphysical detective stories have evolved and peaked in the 20th century. In the early years of the 20th century, Chesterton's tales acknowledged supernatural mysteries could reach beyond human knowledge and understanding. From the 1930s to the 1940s, proto-postmodernist writers made experimental fictions flourish again, including Borges, Flann O'Brien, Vladimir Nabokov, and Felipe Alfau. Influenced by these authors, metaphysical detective stories began to flourish around the world from the 1960s. Tens of metaphysical detective story writers kept popping up in French, Italian, American, Russian, and Japanese literature. Since the 1980s, the mainstream audience has widely accepted this literary genre of a metaphysical detective story. Some of the most popular metaphysical detective fictions include Singing Detective written by Dennis Potter in 1986 and Umney's Last Case written by Stephen King in 1993.

== Theme ==
Since the 20th century, the genre metaphysical detective stories has developed several major themes with distinct characteristics and structures, including the defeated sleuth, the purloined letter, and the missing person.

=== The Defeated Sleuth ===
The first theme of the defeated sleuth focuses on the armchair detective. In this theme, the detective's failure becomes a fundamental truth of the story. These failures may cover not being able to identify figures, interpret texts, and solve mysteries. Traditional detective stories may usually depict the success of detection. In contrast, the defeat of detection is a common theme of the genre of metaphysical detective stories. Such defeats enhance the connotation of metaphysics in stories. The failure of the detection directly refers to the unsolved mystery and the incomplete text, creating an absence of closure. The theme of the defeated sleuth is used in the novels written by Ewert, Nealon, Sirvent, and Botta.

=== The Purloined Letter ===
The second theme of the purloined letter refers to metaphysical detective stories in which letters and worlds become impenetrable objects instead of relying on the denotation of objects. In such stories, the world may be composed of interchangeable and nameless objects. The world itself resembles the whole detective process in which the readers also detect by themselves. For example, the impression of multiple evidence such as the shape of a fingerprint and a piece of written message can be gathered together, but nothing is real. Such notions of thing-ness of things are seen in many novels. For instance, in Auster's City of Glass (1985), the author depicted the nameless artifacts and ambiguous information of Botta's account and photographs. Gombrowicz's fictions and Susan Elizabeth Sweeney's description of physical traces also reflect this imagination and ambiguity.

=== The Missing Person ===
Another significant theme is the focus on the missing person, which can be the centre of the mystery and the aim of the detection. A wide arrange of detective fictions involve such a missing person as the backbone of the whole story. Specifically, the person might disappear all of a sudden at odd time and odd locations. The missing person cases may be extremely complex and entangled with multiple clues. In the face of such cases, the detective may detect the disappeared person by searching public records, checking internet communities, and conducting surveillance at locations. Some of the latest fictions of this theme may involve The Missing Girl by Jenny Quintana, Everything About You by Heather Child, Perfect Match by D. B. Thorne.

== Examples in literature works ==
Since Poe published his metaphysical works in the 19th century, a lot of classic and representative literature works have emerged as typical metaphysical detective fictions. There are four fictions that are regarded as the most qualified ones, including The Man of the Crowd by Poe, Locos: A Comedy of Gestures by Felipe Alfau, The Crying of Lot 49 by Pynchon, and Pattern Recognition by Gibson, These novels arranged in chronological order range from the beginning of the genre to the postmodern era.

=== Poe's The Man of the Crowd ===
First published in 1840, The Man of the Crowd is regarded as the very first groundbreaking work of metaphysical detective fiction. The enigmatic fiction is written by Edgar Allan Poe, who is an American writer and literary critic in the early 19th century. Poe is considered to be the initiator of the genre of detective fiction and the pioneer of science fiction. The tale tells the story of an unnamed narrator, who dwells in an unnamed place in London after an unnamed disease. However, the narrator is isolated from the majority of the city, and he becomes an alien in the city. He even categorizes the distinct types of different city people he sees until he pays attention to a frail old man who has a peculiar trait. The narrator follows the man and concludes that the man is a "genius of deep crime” after his deliberate investigation. The novel emphasizes the inscrutability and inability of such people to get away from the crowds of London. The narrator serves as a detective in the fiction.

=== Felipe Alfau's Locos: A comedy of gestures ===
Published in 1936, A Comedy of Gestures is a separated story from Felipe Alfau's novel serious Locos. As a Spanish-born American novelist and poet, Felipe Alfau is a famous detective author in the 20th century. Locos is a compilation of interconnected short fictions in which the characters negate the wishes of the author. The characters in the stories begin to compose their own fantasies and even create one another's roles. Such an experimental and subversive style demonstrates the typical feature of metaphysical detective novels. The revolt of the characters receive the love of readers because of their heroic opposition and shows what real detective fiction is.

=== Pynchon's The Crying of Lot 49 ===
Published in 1965, The Crying of Lot 49 is a very short metaphysical detective novel written by the American novelist Thomas Ruggles Pynchon Jr. Pynchon is famous for the density and complexity of his science fictions. The fiction tells a story of Oedipa Maas, who is entangled with the dispute between two companies: Thurn und Taxis and the Trystero. This novel is an exemplary postmodern fiction and qualifies as one of the “ TIME 100 Best English-language Novels from 1923 to 2005". The novel covers a wide range of allusions and implications to the reality, including The Beatles, Vladimir Nabokov, Remedios Varo, and The Courier's Tragedy.

=== Gibson's Pattern Recognition ===
Pattern Recognition is a detective fiction published in 2003 by William Gibson, an American-Canadian speculative fiction writer. The leading character in the novel is Cayce Pollard, who has psychological problems with corporate signs. Pollard lives in New York City and works as a marketing consultant to investigate the effectiveness of a proposed corporate symbol. The fiction emphasizes the examination of the human temptation to find patterns in meaningless data sources. The novel does not stay at the superficial detective level. However, it asks profound questions about human nature in a metaphysical way. The novel also refers to the 9/11 attacks and critical social and political connotations.

== Criticism ==
As a quirky, bookish, decidedly highbrow genre, metaphysical detective stories have also received provocative criticisms among literary critics. The critics focus on literary theories to evaluate the approach and effect of the genre of metaphysical detective stories. Jacques Lacan examined Poe's story and criticised that the story generated a notorious chain of ripostes as well as other problems of deconstruction, intertextuality, and psychoanalytic. Other critics say that metaphysical detective fictions twist the traditional ways in which narratives tell stories and the ways readers appreciate them. Moreover, Metaphysical detective stories themselves also explicitly identify the limitations of genre and present challenges to previous literary theorists, making the genre self-analytical. For example, Richard H. Rodino has commented that critics need to watch out the fluid relations and non-positivistic hermeneutics of metaphysical detective works of literature and that critics may engage in dialogical communication with the new orthodoxies promulgated by metaphysical stories.

These diverse voices generally help metaphysical detective fiction to situate itself as a literary genre better. The postmodernist literature utilizes detective novels as a recurrent narrative subtext since the end of World War II. Holquist remarks that this relationship between detective stories and postmodernity is much the same as modernism and mythology. The debate about postmodernity in metaphysical detective fictions remains a central focus of the ongoing critics. Meanwhile, the genre itself provides a meaningful approach to comprehend postmodernism as a phenomenon, a practice, and a theory.
