= JetPunk =

Trivia quiz website

- Website type: Quizzes & trivia
- Available in: English; French; Spanish; Dutch; Italian; German; Finnish; Portuguese; Polish
- Founded: 2008
- Country of origin: United States
- Owner: H Brothers Inc.
- Website: www.jetpunk.com
- Launched: 20 March 2008; 18 years ago
- Current status: Online

JetPunk is an online trivia and quizzing website. Their most popular quiz is the countries of the world quiz. The service offers a variety of quizzes in different topics, such as geography, history, science, literature, music, and mathematics. The site offers quizzes in a variety of languages, including but not limited to: English, French, Spanish, Dutch, Italian, German, Finnish, Portuguese, and Polish. JetPunk has its headquarters in Seattle.

== History ==
The website was established on 20 March 2008 and was created by brothers John and Daniel Hostetler (H Brothers Incorporated). When it was first established, the website was a travel agency-like website and its purpose was to search for airline flights; the creators added a search feature for hotels later. By September 2008, the website began to display quizzes, beginning with a quiz that required one to name all 196 countries of the world. By the end of the year, the quizzes began branching out into other genres. In 2009, the website's design had changed, and JetPunk had its first major change in the beginning of 2011 when it allowed users to create their own quizzes. The quizzes became the primary feature and the JetPunk fish was introduced as the website's logo. The number of quizzes taken grew steadily, eventually reaching 5 million pageviews in 2012.

== Website ==
The website offers many different features. Its mascot is a pufferfish that was originally named Ike, but is commonly referred to as Jeppy the JetPunk Fish, or Jeppy for short. Around Christmas, the logo at the top of the site changes to Jeppy wearing a Santa hat.

=== Gameplay ===
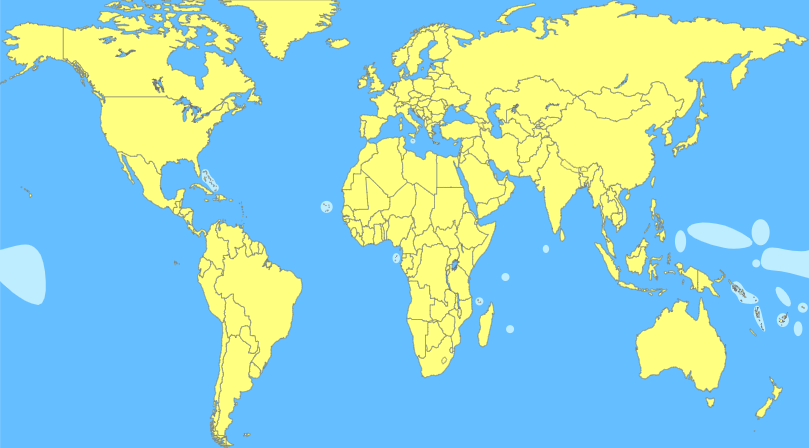
The SVG map used for JetPunk's most popular quiz, Countries of the World

Quiz types on JetPunk
Quiz type	Description
Text	The quiztaker is given a grid. The grid may be empty, or may contain hints, questions or other information. The quiztaker must type in answers, which will then appear in their corresponding spot on the grid.
Picture	The quiztaker is shown a certain number of pictures and must type in answers corresponding to the pictures.
Click	The quiztaker is shown a hint, and must click the correct option(s) from a list of options, based on the hint given.
Click map	The quiztaker is given a map and a list of options (such as countries or U.S. states). The quiz sequentially highlights parts of the map, and the quiztaker must select the option that matches what is highlighted on the map.
Multiple choice	The quiztaker is given a set of questions, each of which has multiple answer choices. The quiztaker must choose the correct answer choice for each question.
Tile select	The quiztaker is given a prompt and a set of tiles. They must select all the tiles that match the prompt and leave all other tiles unselected.
Sudden death	The quiztaker is given a set of tiles. They must select all the correct tiles as specified by the quiz. Selecting any incorrect tile causes the quiz to end immediately.
Whammies	The quiztaker is given a grid and must type in answers, just like in text quizzes, but there is a twist: a set number of wrong answers will cause the quiz to end prematurely.
Point clicker	The quiztaker is given a set of tiles similar to sudden death quizzes. Each tile is given a point value in relation to the rank of the content of the tile in a certain statistic (for example, the tile labeled California would be worth the highest number of points in a US States Population quiz). The user must try to score the most number of points in a set number of clicks.

The site enables users to play both featured and non-featured quizzes. Featured quizzes allow a user to gain points on JetPunk. Up to 5 points can be earned from each featured quiz; the number of points gained is based on the user's score on the quiz, or their percentile among other quiztakers, whichever is higher.

Percentile	% correct	Points
>95	100%	5
75-95	90%	4
60-75	80%	3
50-60	65%	2
25-50	50%	1
<25	<50%	0

The user's "JetPunk level" will increase upon reaching certain point thresholds. Users are required to reach minimum levels to perform certain actions on the website. For example, since October 2021, one must be at least level 40 and be on the website for at least six months to be able to create blog posts. Featured quizzes must be taken timed in order for points to be gained.

Contrastingly, non-featured quizzes do not allow for users to gain points or increase their level on the website. Users can also make quizzes, which may be featured by Dan Hostetler, the JetPunk Quizmaster, or via user nominations. The site currently contains approximately 613,000 quizzes, including over 20,000 geography quizzes. Getting certain scores on specific quizzes will get users badges, and there are currently 44 different badges on the site that users can earn.

In addition to geography quizzes, JetPunk caters to a large audience of various pop culture communities through various quiz documenting information about popular franchises. Pokémon is one such franchise, containing popular quizzes regarding the various characters and types with many takes across multiple languages.

The website also has other features, such as blogs, charts, and other minigames.

The JetPunk Word Search offered a new word search puzzle every day from 1 February 2022 to 31 January 2023. It was then discontinued for two months. On 1 April 2023, the minigame was brought back to the website, with all previous daily puzzles made available. On 1 February 2026, daily featured word searches returned, and a few days later word searches became available to create for all users, similar to quizzes.

The gameplay and level features are similar to sites such as Sporcle, which it is commonly compared to.

On 4 May 2024, JetPunk introduced a new Daily Trivia Challenge feature, which provided a 10-question multiple choice quiz every day.

On 7 February 2025, JetPunk introduced a Minesweeper game that can be played on the desktop version of the site.

=== Other major features ===
Besides quizzes, JetPunk also offers blogs and charts. Blogs allow users to post content with text and images and share it with the community. The number of blogs published has declined since 2021. Charts allow users to make a customized chart with input data to share on the site. After playing a quiz, users will get to see an Interesting Fact or Interesting Quote that has been randomly selected. These are accessible through the Data and Charts tab. On sports quizzes, there are Baseball Facts and Basketball Facts. In April 2024, JetPunk tried a Word of the Day feature, which instead of Interesting Facts a word showed every day. This has since been removed. The site has a Streak feature, which users can extend every day by getting a certain number of questions right on a featured quiz. JetPunk also offers Nominations and Spotlights. Users can nominate about 10 quizzes a week. Every week, the quiz with the most nominations will be featured. Spotlight Awards are given to users at high levels. They can pick an unfeatured quiz to spotlight on the front page.

The website has a large array of interactive functionality for inter-user networking, such as being able to leave comments on a certain quiz, rating quizzes, making and "liking" blog posts, and replying to other users. The site also allows users to easily share with each other their scores on quizzes.

=== Membership ===
Only users of the site are allowed to create quizzes and acquire badges for playing certain ones, although basic registration is free. Users can also acquire a JetPunk Premium membership that allows access to certain features of the site, such as Quiz Analytics, as well as the removal of ads on the site.

=== Popularity ===
As of October 2026, the website's quizzes have been played over 1.6 billion times. The site's most popular quiz, the "Countries of the World Quiz", has been played almost 47 million times. The site has also been mentioned in the Hindustan Times as a "great trivia hotspot", and some of its geography quizzes have been featured in various YouTube videos, including one by British YouTuber GeoWizard.

TikTok has become a popular spot for sharing JetPunk, in which many people will upload timelapsed videos of themselves completing JetPunk quizzes for their audiences, typically of quizzes where one "fills in" a map with their answers. The JetPunk tag on TikTok has over 46 million views as of May 2023.

== Languages ==
Initially, JetPunk was only available in English, but after a few years of existence as a quiz website, more and more languages became usable. Available languages can be classified on a feature hierarchy, from the ones who have a fully dedicated section (9 languages) to those who only have an officialised "Countries of the World" quiz (over 60).

Featured languages are not selected on the basis of the number of speakers in the world, but according to the activity of each language on the site itself. This is why only four of the seven languages considered as "big" or "regional" by David Graddol have a dedicated section on JetPunk. Finnish is the latest language to be featured, on 10 May 2021. In 2022, the non-featured language with the most users was Russian, representing about 1.5% of the accounts on the site.

JetPunk languages
Languages	Dedicated section	Dedicated page(s)	Featured "Countries of the World" quiz	"Countries of the World" quiz
Afrikaans	No	No	No	Yes
Albanian	No	No	No	Yes
Arabic	No	Yes	Yes	Yes
Azerbaijani	No	Yes	No	Yes
Bengali	No	No	No	Yes
Bulgarian	No	Yes	No	Yes
Catalan	No	Yes	No	Yes
Chinese (simplified)	No	No	No	Yes
Chinese (traditional)	No	No	No	Yes
Croatian	No	Yes	No	Yes
Czech	No	Yes	No	Yes
Danish	No	Yes	Yes	Yes
Dutch	Yes	Yes	Yes	Yes
English	Yes	Yes	Yes	Yes
Esperanto	No	No	No	Yes
Estonian	No	Yes	No	Yes
Finnish	Yes	Yes	Yes	Yes
French	Yes	Yes	Yes	Yes
Galician	No	No	No	Yes
Georgian	No	No	No	Yes
German	Yes	Yes	Yes	Yes
Greek	No	Yes	No	Yes
Hebrew	No	No	No	Yes
Hindi	No	No	No	Yes
Hungarian	No	Yes	No	Yes
Icelandic	No	No	No	Yes
Indonesian	No	No	No	Yes
Irish	No	No	No	Yes
Italian	Yes	Yes	Yes	Yes
Japanese	No	Yes	No	Yes
Korean	No	Yes	No	Yes
Latin	No	No	No	Yes
Latvian	No	No	No	Yes
Lithuanian	No	No	No	Yes
Luxembourgish	No	No	No	Yes
Maltese	No	No	No	Yes
Maori	No	No	No	Yes
Nepali	No	No	No	Yes
Norwegian	No	Yes	No	Yes
Persian	No	No	No	Yes
Picard	No	No	No	Yes
Polish	Yes	Yes	Yes	Yes
Portuguese	Yes	Yes	Yes	Yes
Romanian	No	Yes	No	Yes
Romansh	No	No	No	Yes
Russian	No	Yes	No	Yes
Samoan	No	No	No	Yes
Serbian	No	Yes	Yes	Yes
Slovak	No	No	No	Yes
Slovenian	No	No	No	Yes
Sorbian	No	No	No	Yes
Spanish	Yes	Yes	Yes	Yes
Swedish	No	Yes	No	Yes
Tagalog	No	No	No	Yes
Telugu	No	Yes	No	Yes
Thai	No	No	No	Yes
Turkish	No	Yes	No	Yes
Ukrainian	No	No	No	Yes
Urdu	No	No	No	Yes
Uzbek	No	No	No	Yes
Venetian	No	Yes	No	Yes
Vietnamese	No	No	No	Yes
Welsh	No	No	No	Yes
Yiddish	No	No	No	Yes

== Philanthropy ==
JetPunk donates 5% of their revenue for planting trees. Until 2022, the site used to have a counter at the top of their homepage that showcases an estimation on how many trees have been planted, based on funds contributed. Currently, the counter is not continuously updated. In the past, JetPunk has partnered with Arbor Day Foundation in order to plant trees. Since November 8, 2019, they have partnered with a non-profit organization called Trees for the Future. Since then, they have planted over 500,000 trees.

== Analytics ==
As of May 2023, JetPunk ranks No. 71 in the list of most visited gaming websites in the United States. 19.39% of the site's users are from the United States, with 10.46% from the United Kingdom, 9.78% from France and 1,86% from Bulgaria, respectively. Furthermore, a majority of JetPunk users come from the western world. The website also gets about 1.5 million pageviews daily, equaling approximately 547.5 million pageviews annually. On 20 August 2024, JetPunk officially achieved the milestone of over one billion takes.

== JetPunk Shop ==
After months of development, the JetPunk Shop became live and visible to the public on 29 June 2023. The shop sold JetPunk-related merchandise like clothing, accessories and stickers. The products were not mass-produced, meaning that they are made after a customer purchases one online. The website itself was powered by Shopify.

The JetPunk Shop was terminated at the end of 2024, citing a lack of interest from JetPunk denizens as the cause for its closure.
