= Ditloid =

Word puzzle

A ditloid is a type of word puzzle in which a phrase, quotation, date, or fact must be deduced from the numbers and abbreviated letters in the clue. An example would be "7 D S" representing "seven deadly sins".

Common words such as 'the', 'in', 'a', 'an', 'of', 'to', etc. are not normally abbreviated. The name 'ditloid' was given by the Daily Express newspaper, originating from the clue "1 = DitLoID", to which the solution is 1 Day in the Life of Ivan Denisovich.

== History ==
The term was coined by William Hartston:

For more than 50 years, crosswords were the only word puzzle that had a universally accepted name, but since the 1970s another has emerged and, in 1999, the new teaser was given a name. The word "ditloid" is not yet in the Oxford English Dictionary, but a Google search for "ditloid" produces tens of thousands of results. I am delighted by this, because it is a word I coined myself and is my only genuine contribution to the English language.

Will Shortz originated the current form of this puzzle and first published it in the May–June 1981 issue of Games magazine, calling it the Equation Analysis Test. In its annual 1981 issue of "What's hot and what's not", Us magazine named the Equation Analysis Test in the "what's hot" category – the only nonperson so recognized. Shortz reports:

Some anonymous person had retyped the puzzle from Games (word for word, except for my byline), photocopied it, and passed it along. This page was then rephotocopied ad infinitum, like a chain letter, and circulated around the country. Games readers who hadn't seen the original even started sending it back to Games as something the magazine ought to consider publishing!

Shortz based the puzzle on the Formula Analysis Test – Revised Form published in Morgan Worthy's 1975 book AHA! A Puzzle Approach to Creative Thinking (Chicago: Nelson Hall). Worthy's equations were in a different format, for example:

Puzzle	Solution
M. + M. + N.H. + V. + C. + R.I = N.E.	Maine + Massachusetts + New Hampshire + Vermont + Connecticut + Rhode Island = New England
"1B. in the H. = 2 in the B."	"A bird in the hand is worth two in the bush" (a proverb)
N. + V. + P. + A. + A. + C. + P. + I. = P. of S.	noun + verb + pronoun + adjective + adverb + conjunction + preposition + interjection = parts of speech

Worthy gives the source of his inspiration and speculates about the perennial popularity of this puzzle:

I got the idea for linguistic equations from graffiti someone had written in the form of an obscene formula on a restroom wall at the University of Florida. When the answer suddenly came to me, I realized the format was a good one for eliciting the "aha effect". After that I used such items as exercise material when teaching workshops on creative thinking.

My guess is that one reason a person enjoys linguistic equations is that the answer hits him or her all at once rather than being solved in an incremental fashion. It is similar to what happens when we suddenly see an embedded figure pop into focus; the satisfaction is visceral rather than just intellectual. My experience was that people often had the answer to an item come to them when they were not consciously thinking about the puzzles, but relaxed, such as in the shower or about to fall asleep.

Another factor is that with well-written items, success does not hinge on obscure information. Ideally, a person should never have to feel, "I could never have gotten that one no matter how long I worked on it." There is something ego enhancing about knowing you have the answer inside and just need to find it.

== Examples ==
Puzzle	Solution
3 B M	Three Blind Mice
20 V on a D	20 Vertices on a Dodecahedron
24 H in a D	24 Hours in a Day
52 C in a P	52 Cards in a Pack
20000 L U the S	Twenty Thousand Leagues Under the Seas
1966 E W the W C	1966 England Wins the World Cup
8 P in the S S	8 Planets in the Solar System
26 L of the A	26 Letters of the Alphabet
