= Sporcle =

Trivia quiz website

- Sporcle's logo

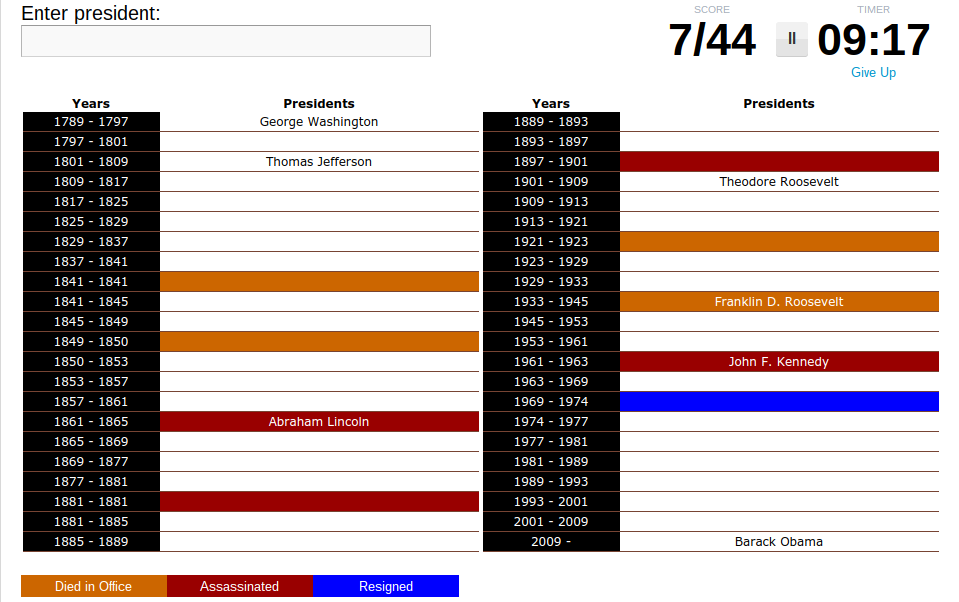
- A typical Sporcle quiz layout, for the quiz 'US Presidents'
- Website type: Quizzes, Trivia, Pub quiz
- Available in: English, German, Portuguese, French, Spanish
- Owners: Sporcle, Inc.
- Creator: Matt Ramme
- CEO: Ali Aydar
- Website: www.sporcle.com
- Commercial: Yes
- Registration: Optional
- Launched: April 23, 2007; 19 years ago
- Current status: Online
- Content license: Copyrighted

Sporcle is a trivia and pub quiz website created by trivia enthusiast Matt Ramme. First launched on April 23, 2007, the website allows users to play and make quizzes on a wide range of subjects, with the option of earning badges by completing challenges.

Sporcle hosts over two million user-made quizzes that have been played over 6 billion times. In 2018, the site expanded its offerings to include weekly, live pub quizzes.

The company is headquartered in Seattle and the Detroit metropolitan area.

== Sporcle.com ==
=== Gameplay ===
Some games on Sporcle require the user to name all of the items within a given subject—such as presidents of the US, Best Picture Oscar-winning movies, or countries whose names are also legal words in Scrabble. Quizzes may also be clickable, have pictures and slideshows, be in crossword format, or involve a map.

Players can play quizzes alone, with or without a timer, challenge other users with their scores, or compete against other users in live showdowns. Quizzes can come in ten game types: Classic, Clickable, Grid, Map, Multiple Choice, Order Up, Picture Box, Picture Click, Slideshow, and Sortable, each of which can be played in a variety of ways, including Minefield, Forced Order, or entering the answers in any order. The type and method by which users will complete the quiz is chosen by the quiz creators.

=== Categories ===
The games on Sporcle can fall into 15 categories: Entertainment, Gaming, Geography, History, Holiday, Just for Fun, Language, Literature, Miscellaneous, Movies, Music, Religion, Science, Sports, and Television. Each category has a number of sub-categories as well. Geography and Sports are the most played of the categories.

=== Popularity ===
As of November 2023, the site has over 1,600,000 quizzes (both published and user created) that have been played a total of around 5 billion times. The site reached 500 million plays on April 23, 2011, 1 billion on April 12, 2013, 2 billion on October 15, 2016, 3 billion on April 2, 2019, 4 billion on April 29, 2021, 5 billion on May 3, 2023, and 6 billion on February 17, 2025.

To date, the most popular quiz on Sporcle is "Find the US States – No Outlines Minefield", created by user mhershfield, which has been played over 83 million times.

=== Appeal ===
Despite Ramme's expectation that Sporcle would appeal to older users, students also use the website. From October 2010 to 2017, Sporcle featured a 'College Rankings' competition on the site's home page, which tracked students registered on the site from a variety of universities, and ranked the top 100 schools according to their weekly usage of Sporcle. Sporcle quizzes are embedded on Mental Floss, ESPN, various SB Nation blogs, and hundreds of other sites, and are played by thousands of different users.

=== Membership ===
Registering on the website is optional and free, but only members can create quizzes, have their playing stats tracked, earn accomplishment badges, and comment on and rate quizzes.

On October 13, 2016, Sporcle announced an optional "Sporcle Orange" subscription, where users can pay a monthly fee for additional functionality and the removal of advertising. Sporcle's vice president, Derek Pharr, said in a forum comment that "all the features currently offered will remain free."

=== Badges ===
Released in August 2012, Sporcle added badges that require users to fulfill certain goals, such as requiring users to complete tasks on specific dates and play specific quizzes to fulfill the requirement. Sporcle continues to add a new badge every Tuesday, with examples ranging from 'Time Bandit' to 'Shiver Me Timbers!'.

To date, Sporcle offers over 1,500 badges, which have been collected over 80 million times.

=== Multiplayer ===
Sporcle has three types of multiplayer activities: Showdowns, Live 5, and Trivia Bingo. In showdowns, users go head to head with other Sporcle users to answer as many questions on a quiz before the other user can answer the same questions. On Live 5, users are given five questions and they have four options to choose from on each question. In Trivia Bingo, users try to get Bingo by clicking on the square on the board with the answer to a given question, while competing against other users.

=== Quizmaking ===
==== Making quizzes ====
Users are able to contribute quizzes in all categories and types. Public quizzes can be seen and played by any user. Many are reviewed by Sporcle staff members, and may be featured on the homepage. Users are limited to contributing 50 quizzes per month, though they can continue to make new ones as drafts or private quizzes. Private quizzes are available for the public to play, but must be accessed through the creator's profile page.

==== Quiz publication system ====
Every day, at least a dozen new quizzes are featured on Sporcle's homepage. This includes several quizzes from various categories and types, in addition to four 'Daily Dose' quizzes at the bottom of the day's section. Since August 2024, the Daily Dose always includes a Word Ladder quiz, in addition to any three of Get The Picture, Mini Crossword, Missing Word, Mixed Word, Quick Pick, Short Order, and Word Hunt. These quizzes follow a similar format to all other quizzes in their category, and often involve wordplay. All published quizzes are subtitled with a custom blurb (often a pun of some sort) on the front page. All publishes are handpicked by Sporcle's admin team.

==== Picks ====
Sporcle also has Editors and Curators. These users have the ability to 'pick' user-created quizzes they deem worthy of being on their respective category and subcategory pages.

== Events ==
Sporcle hosts live pub quizzes and game nights in 33 different US States.

=== History ===
In 2009, Mark Adams (Sporcle's Vice President of Business Development & Entertainment) founded Motor City Trivia. The business expanded to the Toledo, OH area as Glass City Trivia. Both eventually merged into Great Lakes Trivia in 2011.

In 2012, Great Lakes Trivia agreed to become a part of the Sporcle family, with the first shows as Sporcle Live taking place on January 2, 2013.

In January 2020, Sporcle acquired Stump! Trivia and its related assets from NTN Buzztime.

Beginning in March 2020, as COVID-19 mandated the shutdown of bars and restaurants nationwide, Sporcle Events began to host online trivia in various formats. The company hosts hundreds of virtual trivia nights on Zoom every week, with participants paying $5 per device they use to join the game. The company also hosts Sporcle Live! On Air, which streams live on YouTube a few times every week and is free to join. During this time, Sporcle also expanded their live offerings to include Private Event services. Organizations and individuals utilize this entertainment service in a variety of contexts, such as professional development, team building, or party entertainment.

=== Categories ===
In addition to weekly general knowledge trivia, Sporcle Live hosts themed trivia nights for players interested in specific topics as well as in partnership with events like Motor City Comic Con.

Sporcle Live also hosts private events and puts on an annual trivia convention known as SporcleCon. Due to the COVID-19 pandemic, the convention was initially postponed, and on April 23, 2020, cancelled.

In September 2021, it was announced that SporcleCon would be held from September 23, 2022 to September 25, 2022 in Washington, D.C., at the Washington Hilton. The next year saw the convention return for a second consecutive year to Washington, running from September 8 to 10, 2023. Detroit was selected as the host site for the 2024 SporcleCon, with events taking place at One Campus Martius, The Fillmore Detroit, and The Madison from August 16 to 18. SporcleCon 2025 took place on August 15 to 17 at McCormick Place. SporcleCon 2026 is scheduled to be held in Schaumburg IL from November 13 to 15.

=== The Globe ===
Sporcle launched a new league play program, The Globe, in April 2022. Teams that have registered for this free service can earn Passport Stamps (much like Sporcle.com's badges), play in local and national tournaments, and access additional discounts and benefits.

== Haymaker Public House ==
Sporcle opened a sports bar in Ann Arbor, Michigan, called Haymaker Public House.

Haymaker permanently closed its doors on October 4, 2024.

== Mobile apps ==
In 2010, Sporcle released an iPhone and Android application with 250 games, though it has since been expanded to include any compatible quiz. Sporcle also has an Alexa app.

Sporcle Live has a mobile application to help live trivia players find nearby trivia nights, RSVP to events, and access visual rounds.

In April 2020, Sporcle introduced a mobile application called 'Sporcle Party' for group trivia play. The app features various categories of trivia, with the categories of Odds and Ends, Movie Maniac, Fun for All, Sporty Sports, and Geography Buff available to all users. A variety of other categories can be purchased through the app.

In December 2020, Sporcle launched the mobile application 'Word Ladder'.

In March 2023, Sporcle launched a new mobile application of the same name, which is compatible with all quiz content from the website.
