= Pub quiz =

Quiz held in a pub or bar

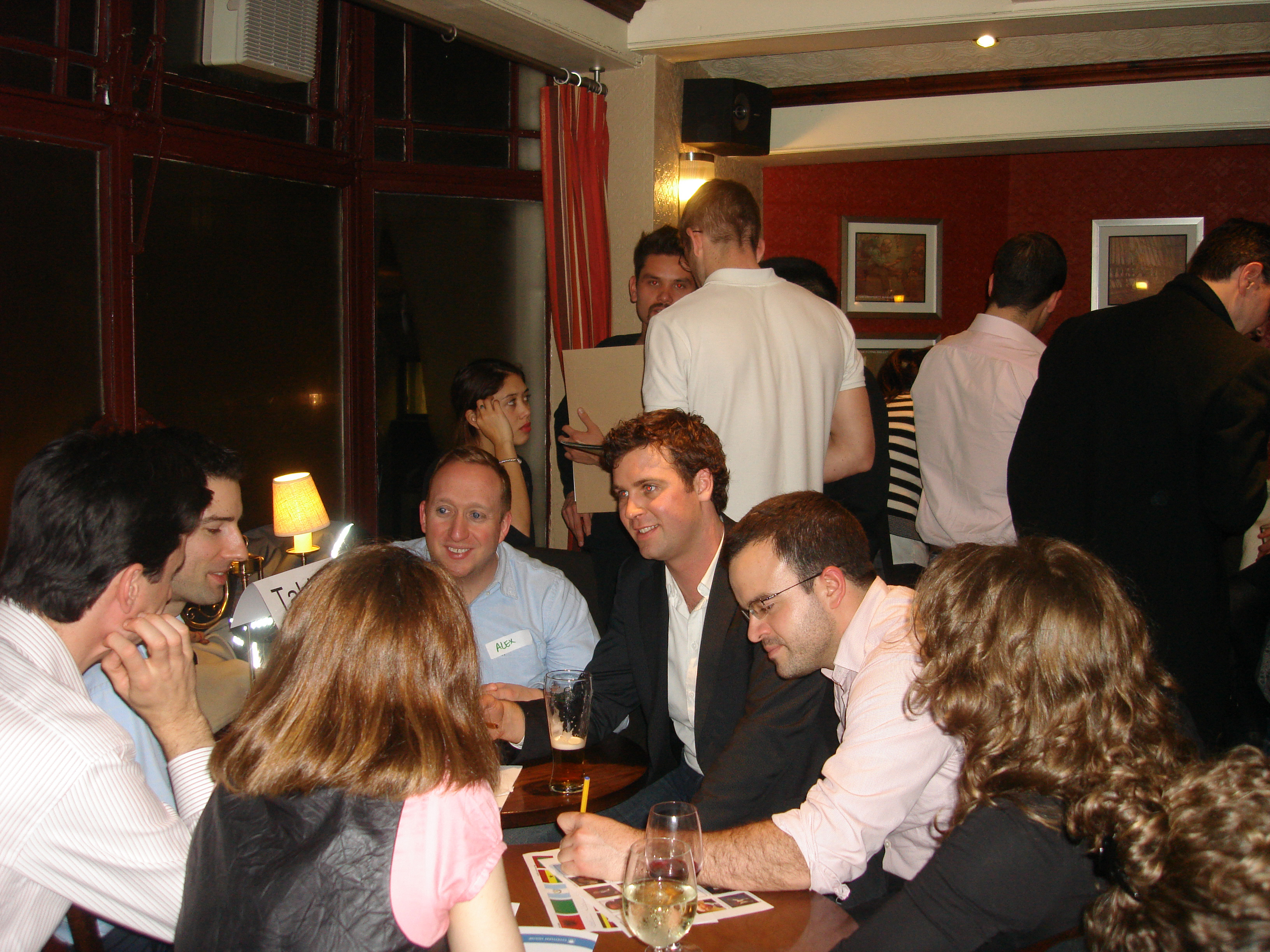
A pub quiz team in England

A pub quiz is a quiz held in a pub or bar. These events are also called quiz nights, trivia nights, or bar trivia and may be held in other settings. The pub quiz is a modern example of a pub game, and often attempts to lure customers to the establishment on quieter days. The pub quiz has become part of British culture since its popularization in the UK in the 1970s by Burns and Porter, although the first mentions in print can be traced to 1959. It then became a staple in Irish pub culture, and its popularity has continued to spread internationally. Although different pub quizzes can cover a range of formats and topics, they have many features in common. Most quizzes have a limited number of team members, offer prizes for winning teams, and distinguish rounds by category or theme.

== History ==
The origins of the pub quiz are sketchy.

In 1946, a night in Yorkshire is mentioned in the Guinness Book of Records.

In the late 1950s in Merseyside and Lancashire, "about 4,000 people became involved in the organised quiz leagues that sprang up from Bootle to Southport".

On 30 October 1963, The Liverpool Echo carried an interview with Jack Robinson, "on the Merseyside quiz scene since it started".

In 1976, Sharon Burns and Tom Porter founded and organised 32 pub quiz teams in three leagues in southern England. The goal was to attract people to pubs on quieter, “off” nights. From the time Burns and Porter began their weekly quiz in the 1970s, popularity grew over the next few years from just 30 teams to 10,000 teams in their weekly events.

== Format ==
Pub quizzes (also known as live trivia, or table quizzes) are often weekly events and will have an advertised start time, most often in the evening.

While specific formats vary, most pub quizzes involve written answers to questions which are distributed in written form or announced by a quizmaster.

One format for quizzing is called "infinite bounce" or “infinite rebounds”. Infinite bounce is often used to accommodate large numbers of teams. One question is addressed to each team in subsequent order. If one team fails to answer, the question passed along to the following team. Quizzes may also employ the “pounce” strategy. Here, a time limit is introduced and if the team under questioning fails to answer, any team may “pounce” and offer the answer.

Generally someone (either one of the bar staff or the person running the quiz) will come around with pens and quiz papers, which may contain questions or may just be blank sheets for writing the answers. A mixture of both is common, in which case often only the blank sheet is to be handed in. Usually a team hands their answers in for marking to the quizmaster or to the next team along.

=== Teams ===
It is up to the quizzers to form teams, which are generally based on tables, though if one table has a large group around it they may decide to split up. Some pubs insist on a maximum team size (usually between six and ten). The team members decide on a team name, often a supposedly humorous phrase or pun, which must be written on all papers handed in.

There is often a small buy-in for the quiz that contributes to the winning pot at the end of the night. Many pub quizzes require no payment at all, as the event is simply a way to get paying customers into the venue to buy food and drinks, typically on less busy nights of the week.

=== Questions ===
The person asking the questions is known as the quizmaster or quiz host. Quiz hosts often also mark and score answers submitted by teams, although sometimes teams will mark each other's answer sheets.

The questions can be set by the bar staff or landlord, by a third-party who may also supply the host, or by volunteers from amongst the contestants. In the latter case, the quiz setter may be remunerated with drinks or a small amount of money.

Often questions may be drawn from the realm of 'everybody knows' trivia, sometimes leading to controversies when the answers are false or unverifiable. Generally, specialist companies will have proof read and verified answers prior to supply, avoiding such issues. In addition, as the quizzes are not formal affairs, slight errors in wording may lead to confusion and have led to a 2005 court case in the UK.

=== Rounds ===
There are typically between 1–6 rounds of questions, ranging from 10 to upwards of 80 questions. Rounds may include the following themes (in order of popularity):

- Factual rounds – these are usually spoken, either over a public address system or just called out. Common topics include:
  - General knowledge – covering topics such as history, geography and science and nature. There may well be more than one of these rounds.
  - Sport – comprising the statistics and minutiae of both well-known and obscure sports.
  - Entertainment – general pop culture, including movies, TV shows and music (see also below).
  - True or False – questions to which the answer is True or False.
- Picture round – these use printed hand-outs or televised images consisting of pictures to be identified. These rounds may use photos of famous people (possibly snapped out of context or else partially obscured), logos of companies (without tell-tale lettering), famous places or objects captured from a strange angle. Usually these rounds are completed across the duration of the quiz with a hive of activity at the start, to keep guests entertained during breaks between rounds; and are marked halfway through.
- Who Am I? – A series of clues to the identity of a famous person (or thing). Clues are given in order of descending difficulty. The earlier a team can identify the correct answer, the more points they are awarded.
- Music round – these consist of excerpts (often only the intro or other non-vocal segment) of songs played over the PA system. Usually the teams must identify the song, artist, and/or the year the song was released. Variations include the use of film and TV soundtracks, or classical music rounds (requiring the composer, title, and/or style). This round may be dependent on proper licensing from performers rights organizations.
- Audio round – similar to music rounds, but sound clips are played from movies, television shows, YouTube videos, etc.
- Year rounds — these rounds list important, historic events and offer points for correctly identifying the year in which they took place.
- Puzzle rounds – generally on a hand-out sheet. These may consist of crossword puzzles, anagrams, Ditloids, Dingbats and basic mathematics problems.
- Novelty rounds – themed round a specific word or name (e.g. all the questions relate to a famous Norman); 'connections', where the last answer in the round provides a link to all the previous answers; true or false; and various others to break up the general stream of questions.

Beyond these standard rounds, themes and variety are only limited by the quizmaster’s creativity. Rounds can involve any number of bizarre and random topics, varying in difficulty and subject matter.

=== Bonus rounds ===
In some quizzes, teams can select one or two rounds as "jokers", in which their points will be doubled (or otherwise multiplied). Teams usually select their joker rounds before the start of the quiz, although some rounds may be excluded. Teams who consider themselves to be particularly strong on certain subjects can improve their chances with a good joker round, but risk wasting the joker if the questions are unexpectedly difficult. The idea of using a joker in a game may come from the BBC television programme It's a Knockout.

Some quizzes include a bonus question, in which a single answer is required with one or more clues given each round making the answer progressively easier to solve. In some variants, the first team to hand in the correct answer wins either a spot prize or additional points to their total score. In others, the questions continue until all teams have the correct answer with each team being given progressively fewer additional points the longer it takes them to submit the correct answer.

=== Jackpots ===
Some quizzes add a small, separate round of questions to the end of a regular quiz, with the chance to win a jackpot. Each week an amount of money is added to the jackpot, and if no team answers the questions correctly, the money rolls over to the next quiz. The maximum amount of the jackpot may be limited by local gaming regulations.

Cash jackpots may be won by a variety of methods including one-off questions and dance-offs.

=== Marking ===
In many cases, the papers are marked by the quiz host. An alternative method is to have teams swap papers before marking, though this is typically employed for larger numbers of teams. Generally, teams will not mark their own answers to avoid accusations of cheating.

Typically, each correct answer awards one point, though some questions may offer multiple points for their respective answers. Certain quizzes allow half marks for "nearly right" answers (such as a celebrity's surname when their full name was required), or there may be additional points for particularly difficult questions.

=== Cheating ===
With the mass use of mobile phones and mobile internet access, cheating has become a problem for some pub quizzes — covert calls, texts and internet use in the toilets or outside smoking area, recent newspapers and magazines brought along especially for the event, ringers and so on. Another form of cheating is seen in large groups posing as multiple teams. Most quizzes set a limit on team members to prevent large numbers of people collaborating, but this problem is difficult to regulate. A lot of quizzes now ban the use of mobiles and nullify the score of any team found to be cheating. While this issue is more prevalent where large sums of money are concerned, cheating can still be observed for relatively low stakes.

A modern solution to prevent the use of mobile phones is to host the quiz on a mobile quiz app that can detect when the user has left the app or has taken too long to answer a question.

=== Prizes ===
Prizes are awarded to the highest-scoring team, and often to runners-up. Prizes are usually one of the following:

- Alcoholic drinks: a case of beer or some money on a bar tab to spend at that pub are common.
- Cash: if there is an entry fee for the quiz, this is often pooled to form prize money. This may all go to the winning team or contribute toward the ‘jackpot’ (see above).
- Vouchers: such as cinema discount coupons, food discounts, or drink vouchers for use at the bar holding the quiz.
- Promotional items from a brewery: merchandise such as t-shirts or beer glasses advertising the establishment.
- Miscellaneous or novelty prizes: possibilities include chocolate or cheap toys. The winning team may get first choice to pick a prize from a range on offer.

Occasionally after the main rounds a low-stakes raffle is brought around, for which players pay a small additional fee, to fill time whilst scores are totted up.

== Technology ==
In a digital pub quiz, wireless handsets replace the more usual pen and paper. A computer receives and records the answers from each team's handset and the results are exported to a spreadsheet at the end of the quiz. A time limit can be set for each question (e.g. 60 seconds) and it is possible to determine which team answers in the fastest time for spot prizes and tiebreaks. The visual rounds may also use TV screens around the bar to broadcast the clues.

Founded in 1984, NTN Buzztime was the first company to create and distribute pub quiz software systems to bars and restaurants in 1987.

In modern times, dedicated smart handheld devices allow competitors to buzz in an answer, usually in the form of multiple choice.

== Commercial projects ==
As the pub quiz concept spread to the US in the 1990s, several companies formed to provide services to bars and restaurants organizing quizzes. Different from the quiz league in the UK, US commercial pub quizzes typically involve more than just two teams and can have as many as 25–35 teams playing in a single location, with up to 6 people per team. Quiz companies charge bars a fee for hosting the quiz, which may range from $80 per week to $175 or more depending on attendance. At least 20 different pub quiz companies currently exist in the US, with most operating events concentrated in major metropolitan areas.

== Leagues and competitions ==
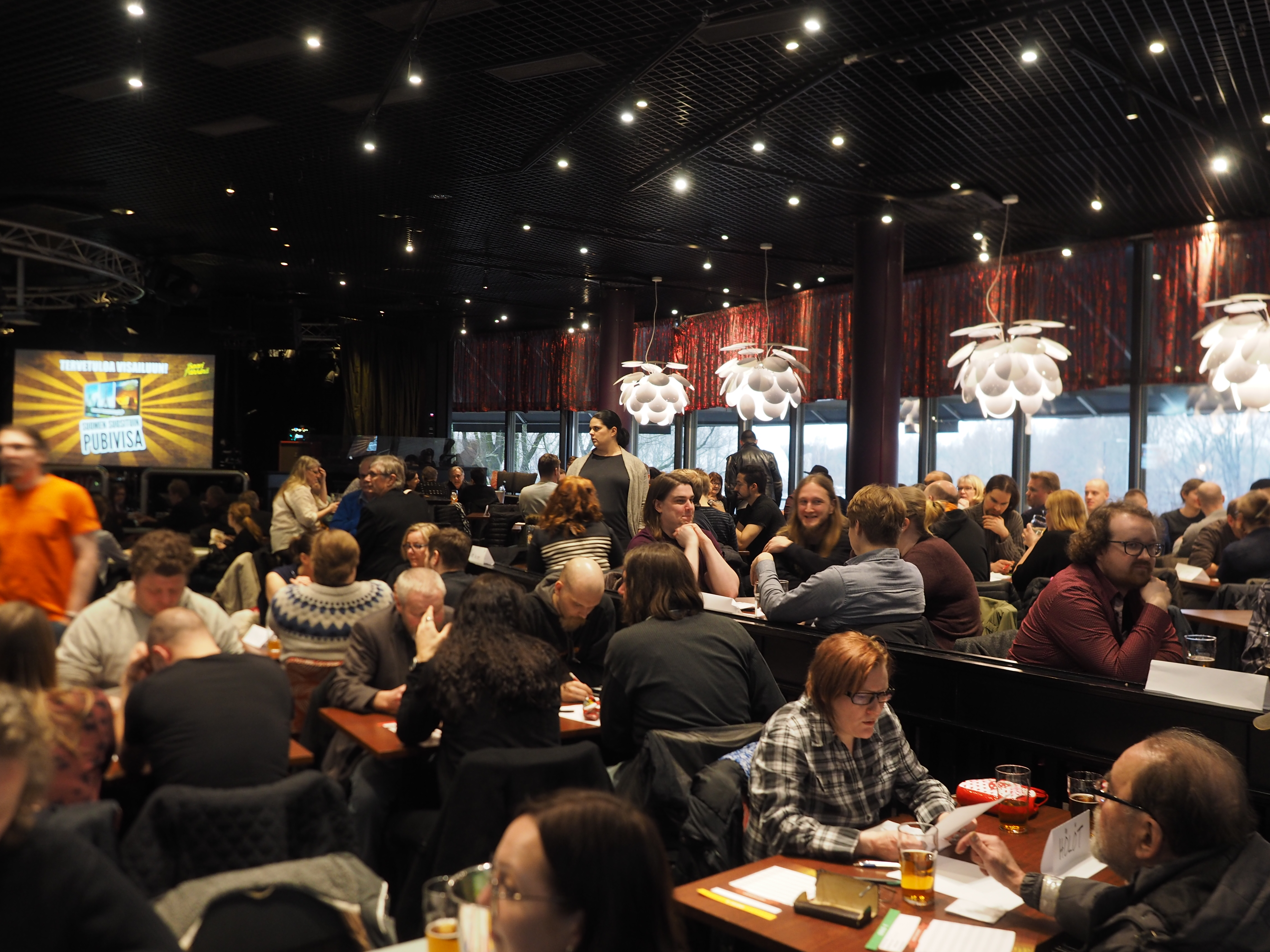
A Finnish pub quiz championship event

A quiz league is an organization that runs quizzes—typically in pubs—though with several distinctions from the standard pub quiz. They often involve only two teams and include a number of individual questions. Prizes are uncommon at a league match, aside from congratulatory kudos to the quiz team winning a league or a knockout competition.

There are additionally non-pub-based leagues, where teams from throughout a region, county, state or country meet annually for more prestigious competitions, with greater prizes. Representative teams may either be the best team from each pub or a team selected from the best individuals.

Internationally, Believe it or Not Quiz Events in New Zealand have held an annual Champion of Champions quiz in Auckland since 1998. Initially open to teams from pubs within the greater Auckland region, it is now open to teams from throughout New Zealand. In practice, travel costs prevent most teams from the lower North Island and the South Island participating, although Christchurch, Nelson and Wellington have all provided teams.

The Australasian Pub Quiz Championships has taken place annually since 2018. Open to teams from pubs and clubs from across Australia and New Zealand, the 2018 Championships was simultaneously run in Sydney, Canberra, and Wellington in late April.

The United States National Trivia Association presents "The Riddle", a finals event open to eligible teams who play the official NTA "Quizzo!" live trivia game. Approximately a thousand players attended the 2008 event in Atlantic City, New Jersey.

Sporcle runs the Pub Champions Trivia League, which hosts regional, state, and national tournaments. Their league championships are primarily based in the midwest United States. [18]

== World record ==
The Guinness World Records lists the "Largest Pub Quiz" to a virtual quiz hosted by Jay Flynn of the UK, on April 30, 2022, with over 182,000 participating households.

== In popular culture ==
- Pub quizzes have appeared in the British sitcoms Minder, Bottom, Gavin & Stacey, The Office and Early Doors, amongst others.
- A January 2013 episode of Anger Management features Charlie Sheen's character involved in a game of bar trivia.
- The New Zealand television drama Nothing Trivial centres around five characters who meet regularly at a pub quiz.
- The ITV game show Quiz Night with Stuart Hall was based on this concept. The set on which the show took place had a bar theme to it; contestants and the host even drank beer while doing the show.
- The Irish television drama Trivia from 2011 to 2012 focuses on the captain of a pub quiz team.

== Regional ==
=== United States ===
In Philadelphia, many bars, specifically those owned by Irish-Americans, will have "Quizzo" nights.

Trivia nights are sometimes used as fundraisers for nonprofit organizations, and these are very common in the Greater St. Louis area. A trivia radio show was popular in the 1970s, and trivia nights as a fundraiser became popular after introduction by an Australian immigrant couple in the early 1980s.

== See also ==
- Drinking culture
- Puzzled Pint – International social event
- Quizbowl – Academic quiz-based competition
- Quiz league – Organised quizzing format
- List of public house topics
