= Alden Penner =

Canadian musician and producer (born 1983)

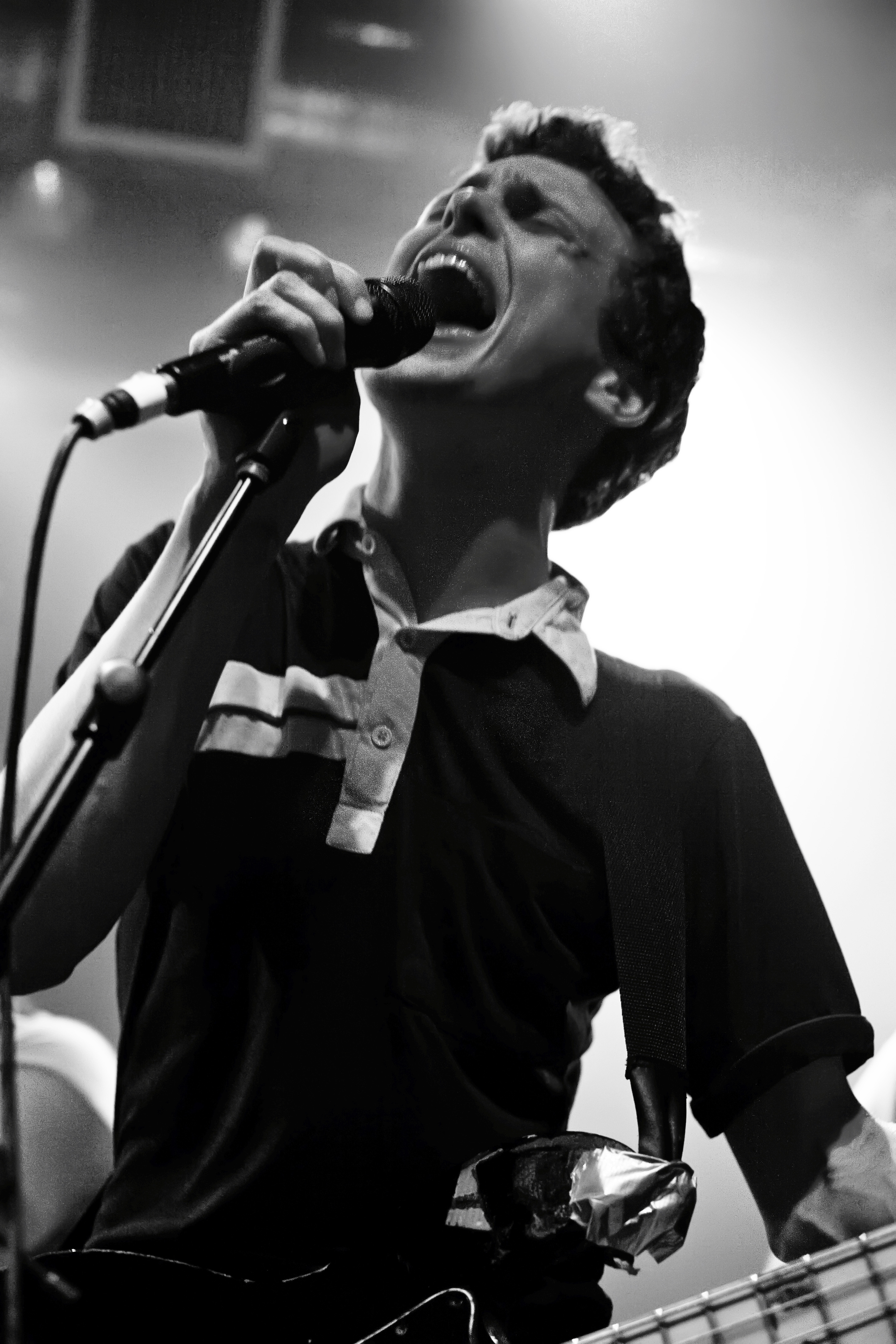
- Alden Penner performing with Clues

Background information
- Born: 12 January 1983 (age 43); Loretteville, Quebec, Canada
- Genres: Indie pop Indie rock Alternative rock Folk
- Instruments: Vocals, electric guitar, bass guitar, keyboard
- Years active: 2000–present
- Labels: Alien8; Rough Trade; Art School Dropout; Constellation Records; Caterpillars of the Community; Beep! Beep! Back Up the Truck; Villa Villa Nola; Take This Hammer
- Website: Alden Penner at Bandcamp; Clues at Constellation Records

Alden Penner (born 12 January 1983) is a Canadian musician and producer best known for his work with the Unicorns, Clues, and for his solo output.

== Career ==
=== The Unicorns (2000–2005) ===
In December 2000, Penner formed the Unicorns with Nicholas Thorburn in Campbell River, British Columbia. The duo's first release was a limited edition CD entitled Unicorns Are People Too on their own label, Caterpillars of the Community. This was shortly followed by their début LP Who Will Cut Our Hair When We're Gone?, released by Alien 8 in North America and Rough Trade in the UK. With the addition of drummer Jamie Thompson the band embarked on a hectic tour of North America, Europe and Australia throughout 2003–2004 before announcing their split in January 2005.

=== Solo work and Clues (2005–2010) ===
Penner's first release as a solo musician was a limited-edition 7-inch entitled The Ghost of Creaky Crater. The single was recorded in Melbourne whilst the Unicorns were on tour and released by the label Art School Dropout in 2005. Penner reissued the single on his own Montreal-based label Take This Hammer in 2006, soon followed by a split 7-inch with Brendan Reed (formerly of Arcade Fire) entitled Surface To Air Missive / I Love What U Did. Penner and Reed then formed Clues, playing their first show at the Pop Montreal festival in October 2007. Clues' self-titled debut album was released on 19 May 2009 by Constellation Records, and toured across North America and Europe throughout 2009. The band have been on "indefinite hiatus" since 2010.

Also in 2009, Penner was credited as producer and musician on the soundtrack to the film Paper Heart. He had previously worked as a composer on various independent films, including the 2005 Larry Kent dark comedy The Hamster Cage, Surfing The Waste ("a musical documentary about dumpster diving"), and The Visible Will vs. the Invisible Wall in which Penner collaborates with Algerian refugee Abdelkader Belaouni.

=== The Hidden Words (2011) ===
In 2011 Penner spent time travelling across North Africa and the Middle East before releasing a solo EP entitled Odes To The House on the Netherlands label Beep! Beep! Back Up the Truck. He then returned to Montreal and reunited with drummer Jamie Thompson, forming another new group The Hidden Words with musicians Eric and James Farr, Marie-Claire Saindon and Neah Bahji Kelly. In late 2011, they self-released an album entitled Free Thyself From The Fetters of this World in which Penner took lyrical inspiration from Baháʼu'lláh, founder of the Baháʼí Faith. Penner described his exploration of the Baháʼí Faith around this time: "I discovered a lot of things that I already agreed with, but that were articulated in a way that I found very empowering... It radically shifted my thinking." Penner left the Baháʼí community in 2013 due to personal differences with others.

=== Exegesis, Unicorns reunion and Canada in Space (2013–2015) ===
In late 2013, Penner released a solo EP, Precession, followed by a self-produced LP entitled Exegesis which he released through his Bandcamp page on 4 February 2014. The album features songs recorded during his time with The Unicorns and Clues, as well as more recent compositions influenced by the Baháʼí Faith and the Canadian poet Alden Nowlan. Around this time it was also announced that the Unicorns would reunite to support Arcade Fire on a handful of arena shows. On 21 September 2014, the Unicorns played a headline show at the Pop Montreal Festival, but have not played any shows since.

In early 2015, Penner released new track, "Meditate", featuring friend and collaborator, Michael Cera. Penner subsequently announced a new EP titled Canada in Space, to be released on 29 June 2015 on City Slang records, and a European tour of the UK, Netherlands, France and Germany, featuring Cera as both support act and a member of his backing band.

== Discography ==
=== Albums ===
- Unicorns Are People Too (with the Unicorns, 2003)
- Who Will Cut Our Hair When We're Gone? (with the Unicorns, 2003-reissued 2014)
- Paper Heart soundtrack (with Michael Cera and Charlyne Yi, 2009)
- Clues (with Clues, 2009)
- Free Thyself from the Fetters of this World (with the Hidden Words, 2011)
- Odes to the House EP (2011)
- Precession EP (2013)
- Exegesis (2014)
- JUNE 04 EP (2014)
- Canada in Space EP (2015)
- Another Head/Language 7" (2023)
