= Neon Bible =

Studio album by Arcade Fire
- Released: March 5, 2007
- Recorded: 2006
- Studios: Primary recording: Petite Église (Farnham, QC); Additional recording: Win and Régine's house; St. James Anglican Church; (Bedford, QC); Église St. Jean Baptiste; (Montreal, QC); Hungarian National Radio (Budapest); Unknown studio in New York City
- Genres: Indie rock; baroque pop
- Length: 46:59
- Label: Merge
- Producer: Arcade Fire

Arcade Fire chronology
Funeral (2004)	Neon Bible (2007)	The Suburbs (2010)

Singles from Neon Bible
- 1. "Black Mirror" Released: January 22, 2007; 2. "Keep the Car Running" Released: March 19, 2007; 3. "Intervention" Released: July 10, 2007; 4. "No Cars Go" Released: July 23, 2007

Neon Bible is the second studio album by Canadian indie rock band Arcade Fire. It was first released on March 5, 2007, in Europe and a day later in North America by Merge Records. Originally announced on December 16, 2006, through the band's website, the majority of the album was recorded at a church the band bought and renovated in Farnham, Quebec. The album is the first to feature drummer Jeremy Gara, and the first to include violinist Sarah Neufeld among the band's core line-up.

Neon Bible became Arcade Fire's highest-charting album at the time, debuting on the Billboard 200 at number two, selling 92,000 copies in its first week and more than 400,000 to date. Being released within a month of similarly successful releases by The Shins (Wincing the Night Away) and Modest Mouse (We Were Dead Before the Ship Even Sank), Neon Bible was cited as an example of the popularization of indie rock. Neon Bible received widespread critical acclaim. Publications like NME and IGN praised the album for its grandiose nature, while Rolling Stone and Uncut opined that it resulted in a distant and overblown sound.

== Production ==
Following the release of Funeral (2004), which had been recorded in an attic studio known as Hotel2Tango, Arcade Fire decided a permanent recording location was necessary. Following their tour in support of Funeral, the band bought the Petite Église in Farnham, Quebec. Being used as a café at the time of purchase, the Petite Église had once been a church and a Masonic Temple. Once renovation of the church was complete, the band spent the latter half of 2006 recording a majority of the album there. Michael Pärt produced additional recordings in Budapest, recording the Budapest Film Orchestra and a military men's choir. Other sessions included one in New York, where the band recorded along the Hudson River to be near water.

Having produced most of the album themselves, the band decided to bring in someone else for the mixing. Tracks were sent to several well-known mixers/producers to experiment with and after deciding they liked Nick Launay's ideas best, the band invited him to their studio to work on the songs further. For a month Launay worked with the album's engineer and co-producer Marcus Strauss on the mixing of each song, with the band regularly driving up from Montreal to assess their progress. In an interview with HitQuarters, Launay described the mixing process as a "playful thing".

== Composition ==
Beginning work on Neon Bible immediately following a North American tour in support of the band's first album, Funeral, songwriter Win Butler, born in the United States but having lived in Canada for several years, said that he felt he was observing his homeland from an outsider's point of view. The album is rooted in Americana themes, with Bob Dylan, Bruce Springsteen and Elvis Presley being cited as influences.

Arcade Fire began recording with what would become "Black Mirror" and a reworking of the Arcade Fire EP song "No Cars Go" as their starting point. Once the title of the album was decided upon, the band was further inspired after they, according to Win Butler, "watched a lot of TV preachers, get-rich-quick schemes on YouTube." The band was also attracted to using the ocean and television as central images for the album, with Win Butler saying the ocean imagery symbolizes a lack of control; of television, Butler stated that:

People don't necessarily know that they're taking on a worldview, or absorbing ideas [while watching television]. It doesn't necessarily seem like [it's happening], but it definitely does. I find it very easy to get sucked in. It starts to affect the way you see the world.

— Win Butler, Interview, Pitchfork

These ideas are reflected in the arrangement and composition of the album, which lead to a sound of dread and dissonance. The band used a number of less common instruments to achieve this sound; in addition to the orchestra and choir, Neon Bible features a hurdy-gurdy, mandolin, accordion and pipe organ. Win Butler has said that in conceiving the album he hoped for a more stripped-down sound but the songs demanded further instrumentation.

The song "(Antichrist Television Blues)" was originally titled "Joe Simpson (Antichrist Television Blues)" in reference to the father and manager of singers Jessica and Ashlee Simpson. Butler chose to remove Simpson's name from the title, keeping the subtitle parentheses intact. Butler would introduce "(Antichrist Television Blues)" during live performances as "a song about what happens when fathers grow up to manage their daughters."

== Artwork ==
The artwork for the album is a photograph of a six-foot neon sign that the band commissioned for use while on tour. In the photograph used for the cover, the lighted Bible is caught in mid-flicker. Rolling Stone named the artwork one of the five best of the year. AOL Music cited the cover as an example of an artist "keeping artwork alive." The artwork would go on to win Tracy Maurice and François Miron the Juno Award for best CD/DVD Artwork Design of the Year. Frontman Win Butler stated in an interview that the album title is derived from him being particularly attracted to the image, not from the John Kennedy Toole novel The Neon Bible.

== Promotion ==
Largely due to band member Régine Chassagne's Haitian ancestry, the band has tried to raise support and awareness for the socio-economic problems in Haiti throughout their career. The Haitian people had 15,000 dollars donated to them on November 5, 2005. On December 26, 2006, they supported Haitian charity organization Partners In Health by releasing the song "Intervention" on iTunes and donating the proceeds. However, they accidentally uploaded "Black Wave/Bad Vibrations", the track after "Intervention" on Neon Bible. While the song was quickly removed once the problem was discovered, file sharers quickly circulated it on various P2P networks. On his blog, Win Butler quipped, "I guess it is sort of charming that we can send the wrong song to the whole world with a click of a mouse... Oh well."

On December 28, 2006, the band allowed listeners to listen to their first single, "Black Mirror", by calling the number (866) NEON-BIBLE, extension number 7777. The song was also streamed on the band's website beginning on January 6, 2007. The following day, the band revealed a variety of information about the album through a YouTube video. The video, which played a number of sound clips from the upcoming album and featured "Juno award-winning guitarist Richard Reed Parry", gave the album's track listing, release date, and record label.

On February 2, 2007, all the lyrics to Neon Bible were released on the band's website. Also included was the text and an audio clip of a child reading "The Wolf and the Fox", a French fable allegedly written by 17th century French poet Jean de La Fontaine, an allusion to "The Well and the Lighthouse", which is loosely based around the fable. This was followed on February 5, 2007, with the band releasing a promotional pamphlet as a JPEG image on their website that included album-related imagery and much of the French and English text from "The Wolf and the Fox".

In October 2007, Arcade Fire created a website at beonlineb.com with the date October 6 displayed on it. After speculation over what the website was about, including rumors of new material or a live streaming of a concert, it was eventually revealed to be a video for "Neon Bible", featuring Win Butler's face and hands, which the viewer can interact with during the song. ("Beonlineb" is an anagram of "Neon Bible.") "Neon Bible" was the first song on the album to have a music video.

== Tour ==
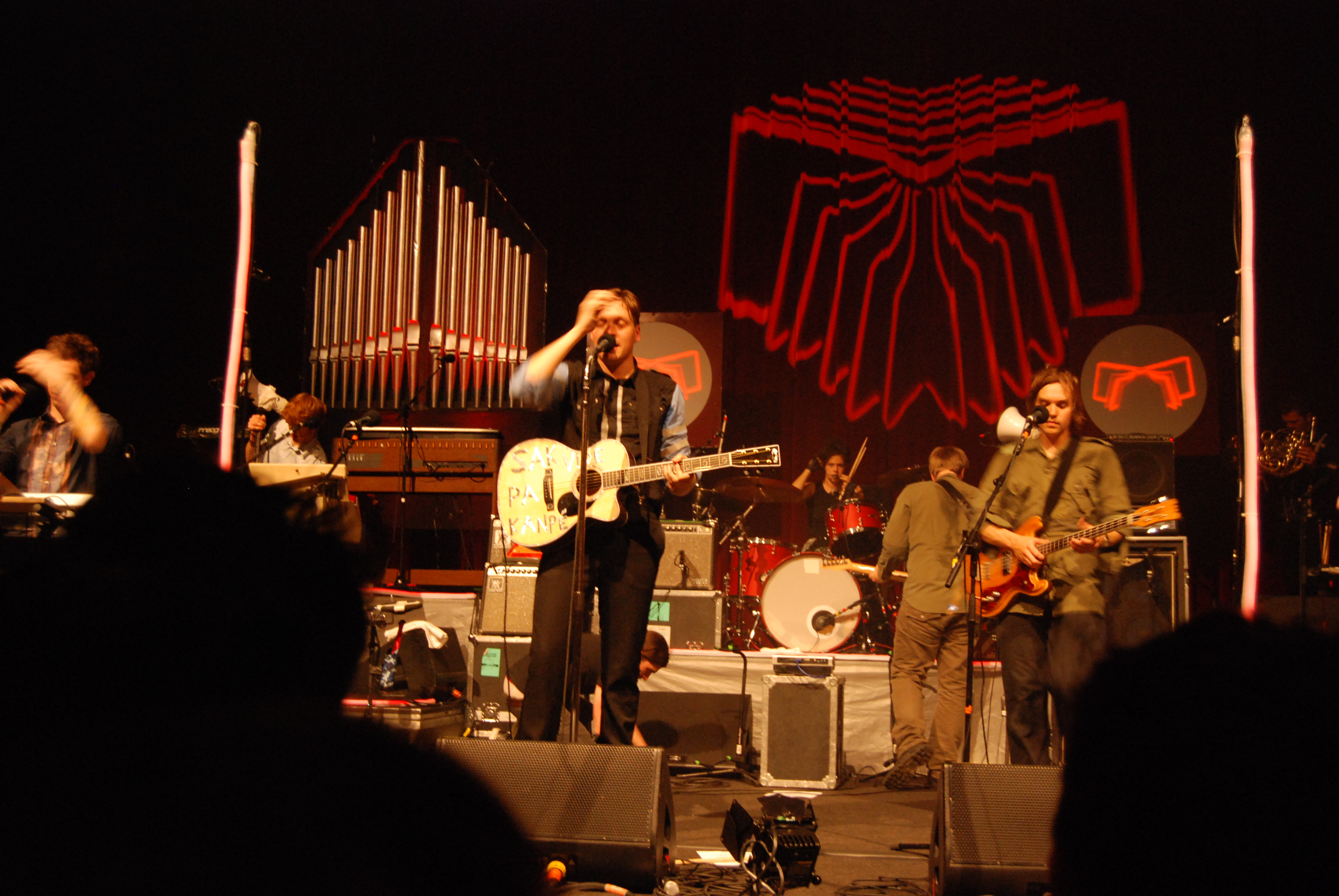
Arcade Fire performing in support of Neon Bible at the United Palace Theater on May 7, 2007

Arcade Fire began their tour in support of the album in January and February 2007, playing a series of concerts at churches and other small venues in Ottawa, Montreal, London and New York. This was followed by a 23 date European tour in March and early April, though the last 9 dates of this were cancelled due to illness. The first North American leg of the tour began April 26 in San Diego and April 28 at Coachella Valley Music and Arts Festival and contained 26 dates. This leg contained openings by The National, St. Vincent, and Electrelane. The band then began an 11-date European leg at Glastonbury Festival on June 22 before returning to North America for 10 more LCD Soundsystem-supported dates beginning September 15 at Austin City Limits. The Neon Bible tour continued with 14 more dates in Europe between October 25 and November 19, and six dates beginning January 18, 2008 in Australia and New Zealand as part of the Big Day Out festival. The tour then ended after three more shows from February 7 in Japan.

On November 5, 2023, Arcade Fire played Neon Bible in full at Hammerstein Ballroom in New York City. The show was announced as a surprise less than a week in advance.

== Reception ==
Professional ratings
Aggregate scores
Source	Rating
Metacritic	87/100
Review scores
Source	Rating
AllMusic	4/5 stars
The A.V. Club	A
Entertainment Weekly	A−
The Guardian	4/5 stars
MSN Music (Consumer Guide)	A+
NME	9/10
Pitchfork	8.4/10
Q	5/5 stars
Rolling Stone	3.5/5 stars
Spin	4.5/5 stars

Compared to the band's debut, Funeral, Neon Bible experienced breakthrough commercial success. During its first week, it debuted at number one in both Canada and Ireland, and number two in the United States, the United Kingdom and Portugal. Neon Bible was out-charted only by Notorious B.I.G.'s greatest hits compilation in the U.S. and the Kaiser Chiefs's Yours Truly, Angry Mob in the UK. It was certified gold by the CRIA in Canada in March 2007.

Upon release, Neon Bible garnered universal acclaim, receiving an 87—the seventh highest score of 2007—from review aggregator Metacritic. NME reviewer Mark Beaumont commented the album "is a climactic monolith of a record in the grand tradition of melodic transatlantic clamour rock." The A.V. Club reviewer Kyle Ryan interpreted the album as a commentary on the post-9/11 American world, saying that "the band is seemingly sending a beacon to other reasonable people forced underground by the world's insanity." Stylus contributor Derek Miller saw the album in similar terms, saying that while the album touches on "violence, paranoia, the falsity of simple labor, the war-call of organized religion—a what's what of indie turmoil after 2003" the band go further to the point where its "thematic threads bind the songs." Robert Christgau gave the album a "A+" grade, saying that Butler and co. "thud rather than thunder. But what a loud and joyous thud it is."

IGN, in giving the album 8.9 out of 10, said "the playing overall seems tighter and more cohesive" and that the album is a "grandiose project, one teeming with jubilant enthusiasm and reverent abundance." Other publications agreed, but viewed some of these same elements negatively. Rolling Stone reviewer David Fricke wrote that he was surprised such a large band could "sound so distant here so often," saying that "the result is a huge sound that only sparkles on the edges, leaving Butler alone in the middle." However, Rolling Stone also named it the fourth best album of the year. Uncut's three-star review of the album said that "at its overblown worst Neon Bible is one of those records that takes itself too seriously to be taken seriously."

Neon Bible was a finalist for the 2007 Polaris Music Prize. Neon Bible was nominated for Best Alternative Album for the 50th Annual Grammy Awards. It was #4 in NME albums of the year, fourth in Rolling Stone's list of albums of the year and album of the year in Q in December 2007. The album won the 2008 Juno Award for Alternative Album of the Year.

=== Accolades ===
Accolades for Neon Bible
Publication	Accolade	Rank
Billboard	Staff Consensus 2007 Albums of the Year	2
Blender	2007 Albums of the Year	2
NME	2007 Albums of the Year	4
Pitchfork	2007 Albums of the Year	27
The Onion A.V. Club	Staff Consensus 2007 Albums of the Year	1
Q	2007 Albums of the Year	1
Rolling Stone	2007 Albums of the Year	4
Spin	2007 Albums of the Year	2
Village Voice	Pazz & Jop: 2007 Albums of the Year	5
Q	250 Best Albums of Q's Lifetime	74

== Editions ==
Neon Bible was released in three versions. They included:

- A traditional compact disc in a jewel case.
- A deluxe compact disc packaged in a paperboard clamshell box with a lenticular front cover and accompanied by two 32-page flip books designed by Tracy Maurice using material shot in 16mm film by filmmaker Francois Miron.
- A double LP that featured the album on three sides of the vinyl at 180-gram quality and an etching on the fourth side. This release also came with a code to allow purchasers to download the entire album in MP3 format. Due to manufacturing delays, this release came out more than two months after the previous versions, on May 8, 2007.

=== A Giant Dog's cover ===
In 2019, Merge Records (Arcade Fire's label for their earlier records, including Neon Bible), released a full-album cover version of Neon Bible by American rock band A Giant Dog. Vocalist Sabrina Ellis commented that "the themes in the album, of outrage at U.S. leadership in the early 2000s, and a need to escape our social climate, sadly, remain pertinent today."

== Track listing ==
All tracks are written by Arcade Fire. All lead vocals by Win Butler unless otherwise noted.

Neon Bible
No.	Title	Lead vocals	Length
1.	"Black Mirror"		4:13
2.	"Keep the Car Running"		3:29
3.	"Neon Bible"		2:16
4.	"Intervention"		4:19
5.	"Black Wave/Bad Vibrations"	Régine Chassagne (Black Wave), Butler (Bad Vibrations)	3:56
6.	"Ocean of Noise"		4:53
7.	"The Well and the Lighthouse"	Butler, Chassagne	3:57
8.	"(Antichrist Television Blues)"		5:10
9.	"Windowsill"		4:16
10.	"No Cars Go"	Butler, Chassagne	5:43
11.	"My Body Is a Cage"		4:47
Total length:			46:59

== Personnel ==
Personnel adapted from album liner notes.

Arcade Fire (mixing, production, arrangement):

- Will Butler
- Win Butler
- Régine Chassagne
- Jeremy Gara
- Tim Kingsbury
- Sarah Neufeld
- Richard Reed Parry

Other personnel:

- Mélanie Auclair – Cello
- Hadji Bakara – Effects
- Owen Pallett – Violin, orchestral arrangements (tracks 1, 2, 10) with Régine Chassagne
- Liza Rey – Harp
- Marika Anthony Shaw – Viola
- Brass: Pietro Amato, Edith Gruber, Margaret Gundara, Jake Henry, Laurent Ménard, Geoffrey Shoesmith, Colin Stetson, Andreas Stoltzfus, Jacob Valenzuela, Martin Wenk
- Vocals: Shauna Callender, Joanne Degand, Chantel Gero, Tasha Gero, Jean Sherwood
- Peter F. Drucker – Choir conductor
- István Silló – Orchestra conductor

=== Technical personnel ===
- Frank Arkwright – Mastering
- Scott Colburn – Engineer
- Markus Dravs – Engineer, mixing (tracks 3, 5)
- Nick Launay – Mixing (tracks 2, 4, 6–9, 11)
- Jean Luc Della Montagna – Production assistant
- Mark "Spike" Stent – Mixing (tracks 1, 10)
- Other assistants: François Chevallier, Alex Dromgoole, Dave Emery, Doctor Brian A. Evans, Mike Feuerstack, Tommy Hough, James Hanna Ogilvy
- Christophe Collette – Photography
- Katherine Cram – Coordination
- Daryl Griffith – Copyist
- Olivier Groulx – Animation, editing
- Csaba Lokös – Orchestra contractor
- Tracy Maurice – Director, artwork, package design
- François Miron – Photography director
- Renata Morales – Costume design
- Vincent Morisset – Web design
- Michael Paert – Coordination, editing

== Charts ==
=== Weekly charts ===
Chart (2007)	Peak position
Australian Albums (ARIA)	7
Austrian Albums (Ö3 Austria)	25
Belgian Albums (Ultratop Flanders)	5
Belgian Albums (Ultratop Wallonia)	17
Canadian Albums (Billboard)	1
Danish Albums (Hitlisten)	11
Dutch Albums (Album Top 100)	13
Finnish Albums (Suomen virallinen lista)	5
French Albums (SNEP)	9
German Albums (Offizielle Top 100)	11
Irish Albums (IRMA)	1
Italian Albums (FIMI)	44
New Zealand Albums (RMNZ)	20
Norwegian Albums (VG-lista)	3
Portuguese Albums (AFP)	2
Scottish Albums (Official Charts)	1
Spanish Albums (Promusicae)	14
Swedish Albums (Sverigetopplistan)	16
Swiss Albums (Schweizer Hitparade)	23
UK Albums (Official Charts)	2
US Billboard 200	2
US Independent Albums (Billboard)	1
US Top Rock Albums (Billboard)	1
US Indie Store Album Sales (Billboard)	1

=== Year-end charts ===
Chart (2007)	Position
Belgian Albums (Ultratop Flanders)	89
French Albums (SNEP)	139
UK Albums (OCC)	67
US Billboard 200	190

== Certifications ==
Region	Certification	Certified units/sales
Australia (ARIA)	Gold	35,000^{^}
Canada (Music Canada)	Platinum	100,000^{‡}
Ireland (IRMA)	2× Platinum	30,000^{^}
United Kingdom (BPI)	Platinum	374,430
United States	—	439,000
^{^} Shipments figures based on certification alone.^{‡} Sales+streaming figures based on certification alone.
