= No Cars Go =

Single by Arcade Fire

from the album Neon Bible
- B-side: "Surf City (Eastern Bloc)" (7")
- Released: July 23, 2007
- Recorded: 2006
- Genre: Indie rock; post-punk revival; chamber rock; art rock
- Length: 5:39 (Neon Bible version); 4:32 (single version); 4:13 (radio edit); 6:02 (Arcade Fire EP version)
- Label: Merge; Sonovox
- Songwriters: Win Butler, Regine Chassagne
- Producers: Arcade Fire; Markus Dravs

Arcade Fire singles chronology
| "Intervention" (2007) | "No Cars Go" (2007) | "The Suburbs / Month of May" (2010) |

"No Cars Go" is a song by Canadian indie rock band Arcade Fire. It is the fourth single released from the band's second full-length album, Neon Bible. The single was released on July 23, 2007.

== Overview ==
The song title is taken from the solo project of former Arcade Fire member Brendan Reed. It first appeared on the band's self-released debut EP Arcade Fire and was re-recorded for Neon Bible.

Some pressings of the single list the B-side as "Surf City Eastern Block" and some list it as "Surf City Eastern Bloc".

== Appearances ==
The song was featured in Eric Bana's 2009 documentary film Love The Beast. It is also featured in Mike Mo Capaldi's part in Fully Flared, a skateboarding video released by Lakai Limited Footwear in 2007.

In the UK, the song was also featured in Top Gear's video montage/preview at the beginning of Series Ten, as well as in ITV's coverage of the UEFA Champions League in 2007/8. It has also featured on series 6 of Wheeler Dealers, a motoring programme on the Discovery Channel. In Italy it was used as the main theme of the soccer's Sunday TV-show "Quelli Che Il Calcio" hosted by Victoria Cabello, from September 18, 2011 to May 19, 2013 on Rai 2. It also was the soundtrack for the Danny MacAskill film The Slabs.

The song was jokingly referred to by Win Butler as "Yes Boats Yes" during their gig at the Hackney Empire on July 7, 2010.

The song was used in the 2023 film Saltburn.

== Controversy ==
"No Cars Go" was used by Fox Sports in a post-halftime montage that aired during its coverage of Super Bowl XLII, and for similar segments in other NFL on Fox broadcasts throughout the 2007 season. Following the Super Bowl broadcast, the band said it would consider legal action against Fox, claiming that the network did not seek permission to use the song.

== Track listing ==
7" vinyl and digital:

1. "No Cars Go" (album version) – 5:39
2. "Surf City Eastern Bloc" – 6:22

== Chart performance ==
| Chart (2007) | Peak position |
|---|---|
| Belgium (Ultratip Bubbling Under Flanders) | 12 |
| Canada Rock (Billboard) | 47 |
| Ireland (IRMA) | 39 |
| Scottish Singles Sales (Official Charts) | 24 |
| UK Singles (Official Charts) | 85 |
