= Clues (Clues album) =

Studio album by Clues
- Released: May 19, 2009
- Recorded: 2008 at the Hotel2Tango and Petite Église
- Genres: Indie rock, indie pop
- Length: 42:29
- Label: Constellation
- Producers: Radwan Moumneh, Mark Lawson, Efrim Menuck, Harris Newman

Clues chronology
Clues (2009)	Endless Forever (2009)

Professional ratings
Review scores
Source	Rating
Allmusic	3.5/5 stars
Rockfeedback	4/5 stars
Pitchfork Media	(6.4/10)
Rock Sound	8/10 stars
The Skinny	3/5 stars

Clues is the self-titled debut album by Clues, and its only album before disbanding in 2010. It was released on May 19, 2009 on Constellation Records., after having leaked onto the internet on April 5, 2009.

The track "Cave Mouth" quotes the melody to Jeff Buckley's "New Year's Prayer."

== Track listing ==
1. "Haarp" – 3:23
2. "Remember Severed Head" – 2:59
3. "Approach the Throne" – 4:16
4. "In the Dream" – 3:53
5. "You Have My Eyes Now" – 4:11
6. "Perfect Fit" – 3:26
7. "Elope" – 5:10
8. "Cave Mouth" – 3:58
9. "Crows" – 3:20
10. "Ledmonton" – 4:22
11. "Let's Get Strong" – 3:31

== Personnel ==
- Alden Penner – band
- Brendan Reed – band
- Lisa Gamble – band
- Nick Scribner – band
- Thierry Amar – guest
- Noah Cannon – guest
- Nathan Gage – guest
- Ben Howden – guest
- Louisa Sage – guest
- Radwan Moumneh – recording
- Mark Lawson – recording
- Efrim Menuck – recording
- Harris Newman – recording
