= Clues (band) =

Indie rock band from Montreal, Canada

- Origin: Montreal, Quebec, Canada
- Genres: indie rock, experimental
- Years active: 2007–2011
- Labels: Constellation
- Members: Alden Penner; Brendan Reed; Nick Scribner; Lisa Gamble
- Past members: Bethany Or; Alden Penner; Jon "Pancake" Boles

Clues was an indie rock band from Montreal, Quebec, formed by Alden Penner and Brendan Reed in 2007. The band's only album Clues was released on May 19, 2009, by Constellation Records. The band have been on indefinite hiatus since 2010.

== History ==
Clues was founded by Alden Penner (vocals, guitar, keys) and Brendan Reed (drums), both active for years in the Montreal music industry. Penner was a founding member of The Unicorns and Reed has been in a number of groups, most notably Arcade Fire. The duo had previously collaborated on a split 7-inch single "Surface to Air Missive / I Love What U Did", released in 2006 on Penner's label Take This Hammer. Penner and Reed were joined by keyboardist Bethany Or (Shanghai Triad) for their official debut performance at Pop Montreal 2007. The group also contributed music to The Visible Will vs. The Invisible Wall, a short film directed by Brett Story as part of the festival's Making Music program. In late 2007, an MP3 entitled "Lead Woods Swollen Fit" appeared online, apparently offering a sample of the band's upcoming album (then rumoured to be titled Rad Boo Horror & the Glory). By late 2008, Bethany Or had left the band and Lisa Gamble and Nick Scribner were recruited from the Montreal art and music scenes to join Penner and Reed on tour across North America and Europe.

Clues's self-titled debut album was released on May 19, 2009, by Constellation Records. Radwan Moumneh recorded the record at the Hotel2Tango in 2008, with additional recording by Mark Lawson at Arcade Fire's Petite Église studio. The album received positive reviews from Exclaim.ca and NPR Music. In November 2009, a 7-inch single was released entitled Endless Forever featuring early versions of the songs "Ledmonton" and "You Have My Eyes Now" from Clues. Lisa Gamble left the band in late 2009 and was replaced by Jon Boles for another tour across Europe.

Clues have been on indefinite hiatus since 2010, with Penner forming a new group The Hidden Words in 2011 and continuing to work on solo material. The band's other members have remained active on the Montreal underground music scene.

== Discography ==
=== Studio albums ===
- Clues (2009)

=== Singles and EPs ===
- Endless Forever (2009)
