= Arcade Fire (EP) =

EP by Arcade Fire
- Released: 15 June 2003
- Recorded: Summer 2002, Maine
- Genre: Indie rock
- Length: 32:47
- Label: Self-released (2003); Merge (2005)
- Producer: Richard Parry; Win Butler; Régine Chassagne

Arcade Fire chronology
Arcade Fire (2003)	Funeral (2004)

Arcade Fire (known unofficially as Us Kids Know) is the debut extended play (EP) by the indie rock band Arcade Fire. The EP was recorded in Maine, United States, during the summer of 2002. Arcade Fire was remastered and repackaged for its 2005 re-release by Merge Records for fans after they had "grown obsessed" with the band's debut album, Funeral. It was initially released on June 15, 2003 by the band at their shows and website, and then re-released in 2005 by Merge. Lyrically, the album tackles themes such as parents, suburbia, new love, dread, and drama.

Upon its release, it received positive reviews from music critics, although some of them noted that it was inferior to their debut album, Funeral. The EP's third track, "No Cars Go", was re-recorded for Arcade Fire's second full-length album, Neon Bible. "No Cars Go" has been played at the majority of live shows since the EP release. Arcade Fire have also played other songs from the EP live on every tour since; however, it has become less frequent. On their recent tours, they notably played "Headlights Look Like Diamonds" and "Vampire/Forest Fire".

== Background and recording ==
In the summer of 2002, Arcade Fire briefly went to Maine to record the EP, since frontman Win Butler's parents had recently moved there after his father got a land conservatory job. The following year, the band self-released the EP on their website and at their shows. Arcade Fire then met with record labels like Alien8, Absolutely Kosher, and Merge Records to release their debut album, Funeral. The band eventually signed with Merge since frontman Win Butler liked bands such as Magnetic Fields and Neutral Milk Hotel who had previously signed with them. Butler said he felt really comfortable with Merge, but denied that there was an "indie label bidding war". In 2004, Merge started to release the EP through their website, "in an attempt to sate the demand of an audience that had quickly grown obsessed with" Funeral, according to Pitchfork. The next year, Merge remastered and repackaged the EP for stores.

== Composition ==
The opening track, "Old Flame", has a "simple" melody and has a lyrical theme of new love. Scott Reid of Stylus Magazine opined that the band Mercury Rev influenced the song, saying it "is very nearly plagiaristic of half of Deserter's Songs". The following track, "I'm Sleeping in a Submarine", also has the "joy" of new love, and it features a chorus consisting of the phrase "A cage is a cage, is a cage, is a cage!" "No Cars Go", the third track on the EP, was described by Reid as "easily a demo outtake on [the Broken Social Scene album] You Forgot It in People ". Allmusic wrote that the song, "with its driving accordion melody line and unified shouts, sounds like the blueprint for Funeral's 'Rebellion (Lies)'." It later appeared reworked on Arcade Fire's second album, Neon Bible.

Butler's wife Régine Chassagne sings on the song "The Woodland National Anthem", and her vocals on the song can be compared to those of Björk. It is a bluesy song with "campfire percussion". The next track, "My Heart is an Apple", features Butler's "soulful" vocals and Chassagne's "childish" vocals. Reid wrote that "Headlights Look Like Diamonds" "pretty much lifts the entire verse from [the Broken Social Scene song] 'Almost Crimes (Radio Kills Remix)'." It features layers of sound continuously being added to the song while Butler sings. At the climax of the song, drums and multi-layered vocals come in, in what Sputnikmusic described as "frenzied chaos". The final track, "Vampire/Forest Fire", contains lyrical themes of "parents, suburbia, apathy, and pure, unadulterated emotion." In the song, Butler's voice progressively grows louder while keyboards play during its chorus. Pitchfork said of the songs: "while they infuse the songs with a dread and drama that reaches an adolescent intensity and bleeds into every track, they never retreat to a romanticized notion of childhood."

== Critical reception ==
Professional ratings
Review scores
Source	Rating
Allmusic	3.5/5 stars
Kludge	8/10
Pitchfork	6.8/10
Sputnikmusic	3.5/5 stars
Stylus Magazine	B+

Arcade Fire received positive reviews from critics. James Christopher Monger of Allmusic gave the EP three-and-a-half stars out of five, saying "While each of the seven tracks contained herein are fully realized, they are as unfocused as they are beautiful, resulting in an intangible, dreamlike atmosphere that reduces each cut – no matter how deep – down to a mere scratch." The website named "Old Flame", "No Cars Go", and "Vampire/Forest Fire" the highlights of the EP. Stylus Magazine gave the EP a B+, and wrote that it "is a strong effort and one of the best 2003 releases everyone seemed to gloss over, but still doesn’t compare to the intense spectacle of their live show." Kludge magazine found the EP's staff ambiguous and not as "wildly unique" as the band's later work.

Sputnikmusic wrote of the EP "In order to listen to this properly, I'd say you need the band's first full length album in order to see quite where this led." The reviewer recommended Arcade Fire "for those who are already fans, and if you aren't (not an option I advise), this should be No. 2 on your shopping list. No prizes for guessing what No. 1 is." Pitchfork gave the EP 6.8 out of 10, saying that it "finds the band still unsure of their capabilities". The music publication wrote that "the build-ups seem either less patient or less directed, the quick changes more deliberate, the structures more top-heavy, and the payoffs ultimately less rewarding [than Funeral]". Reviewer Stephen Deusner did, however, say that "There are moments that not only hint at the heights of [Funeral], but scale such heights themselves."

== Commercial performance ==
Despite being released in 2003, the album did not chart until 2018, when it hit number 39 on the Canadian Albums Chart and peaked at number 18 on the Scottish Albums Chart.

== Track listing ==
All lyrics are written by Win Butler and Régine Chassagne, except "Headlights Look Like Diamonds", written by Butler, Chassagne, and Josh Deu.

Arcade Fire track listing
No.	Title	Lead vocals	Length
1.	"Old Flame"	Butler	3:55
2.	"I'm Sleeping in a Submarine"	Chassagne, Butler	2:46
3.	"No Cars Go"	Butler, Chassagne	6:00
4.	"The Woodlands National Anthem"	Chassagne, Butler	3:56
5.	"My Heart is an Apple"	Butler, Chassagne	4:25
6.	"Headlights Look Like Diamonds"	Butler, Chassagne	4:22
7.	"Vampire/Forest Fire"	Butler	7:13

== Personnel ==
The following people were involved in the making of Arcade Fire:

Arcade Fire

- Win Butler – vocals, guitar, bass guitar, synthesizer, banjo, tambourine
- Régine Chassagne – vocals, piano, Fender Rhodes, synthesizer, percussion, bird calls
- Richard Reed Parry – bass guitars, electric guitar, percussion
- Dane Mills – drums, bass guitar, stomping
- Brendan Reed – drums, tap dancing, percussion, vocals
- Myles Broscoe – electric bass, guitar
- Will Butler – upright bass, clarinet, Fender Rhodes, stomping

Additional musicians

- Gregus Davenport – French horn
- Nikki Conti — alto saxophone
- Liza Rey – harp
- Tim Kyle – electric guitar

Production

- Richard Reed Perry – recording
- Josh Deu – insert
- Cover art, design – Seripop (Serigraphie Populaire)

== Charts ==
Chart performance for Arcade Fire
Chart (2018)	Peak position
Scottish Albums (Official Charts)	18
UK Albums (Official Charts)	39
