= Intervention (song) =

Single by Arcade Fire

from the album Neon Bible
- Released: 2006
- Genre: Indie rock; baroque pop; folk rock
- Length: 4:17
- Label: Rough Trade, Merge
- Songwriters: William Butler; Win Butler; Régine Chassagne; Jeremy Gara; Tim Kingsbury; Richard Reed Parry

Arcade Fire singles chronology
"Keep the Car Running" (2007)	"Intervention" (2006)	"No Cars Go" (2007)

Alternative cover

"Intervention" is a song by Canadian indie rock band Arcade Fire. It is the third single released from the band's second full-length album Neon Bible. The single was released to digital retailers in 2006, and was released as a 7" vinyl in the UK under Rough Trade Records in 2007. In the US, it was released under Merge Records. The B-side of the vinyl includes a cover of another song from Neon Bible, "Ocean of Noise", performed by Calexico.

Arcade Fire performed "Intervention" on Saturday Night Live on February 24, 2007. The song was covered by the operatic soprano Renée Fleming in her 2010 album Dark Hope. The song is also featured as the opening theme for the satirical YouTube livestream programs Jesus Chatline and Buddhism Hotline run by Jonathon Hills.

The song was listed at #271 on Pitchfork Media's "Top 500 songs of the 2000s".

== Track listing ==
1. "Intervention" – 4:17
2. "Ocean of Noise" – 4:54 (performed by Calexico)
