= Keep the Car Running =

2007 single by Arcade Fire

Single by Arcade Fire

from the album Neon Bible
- Released: March 19, 2007
- Genre: Indie rock; baroque pop; folk rock
- Length: 3:28
- Label: Rough Trade; Merge
- Songwriters: William Butler; Win Butler; Régine Chassagne; Jeremy Gara; Tim Kingsbury; Richard Reed Parry

Arcade Fire singles chronology
"Black Mirror" (2007)	"Keep the Car Running" (2007)	"Intervention" (2007)

"Keep the Car Running" is a song by Canadian indie rock band Arcade Fire. It is the second single released from the band's second album, Neon Bible in the UK (while "Black Mirror" is the first in the US). This song was number 22 on Rolling Stone's list of the 100 Best Songs of 2007. In October 2011, NME placed it at number 61 on its list "150 Best Tracks of the Past 15 Years".

The single was released on 19 March 2007, on 7-inch vinyl with the B-side, "Broken Window", in the UK under Rough Trade Records. It peaked on the UK Singles Chart at number 56. The single was released in the US on 8 May 2007, under Merge Records. It is alternatively titled "Keep the Car Running/Broken Window". It peaked at number 32 on the Billboard Hot Modern Rock Tracks chart.

The band performed the song during their 24 February 2007 appearance on Saturday Night Live.

== Track listing ==
1. "Keep the Car Running" – 3:28
2. "Broken Window" – 6:27

== Personnel ==
- Win Butler – vocals, mandolin
- Régine Chassagne – vocals, hurdy-gurdy
- Richard Reed Parry – electric guitar, background vocals
- Tim Kingsbury – bass guitar, background vocals
- Will Butler – keyboards, background vocals
- Jeremy Gara – drums
- Sara Neufeld – violin, background vocals
- Owen Pallett – violin
- Marika Anthony Shaw – viola
- Melanie Auclair – cello

== Charts ==
Chart (2007)	Peak position
Canada Hot 100 (Billboard)	41
Canada Rock (Billboard)	7
UK Singles (OCC)	56
US Bubbling Under Hot 100 (Billboard)	7

== Certifications ==
Region	Certification	Certified units/sales
Canada (Music Canada)	Gold	40,000^{‡}
^{‡} Sales+streaming figures based on certification alone.

== Covers ==
- The song was covered by the Foo Fighters on 17 August and 18 November 2007 during their European Echoes, Silence, Patience & Grace Tour at The O2 in London. The band played it once during a set for Jo Whiley's Live Lounge and previously during a concert for BBC Radio 1's Six Weeks of Summer concert event in Brighton. Dave Grohl announced to the audience that he had played the song earlier in the day but was unhappy with it as he felt he did not perform it well enough, so he felt it was his duty to retry it. He said during the first recording that he listens to the song every morning when he wakes up. The song can be found on The Foo Fighters' "Let It Die" single.
- It was performed live by Bruce Springsteen and the E Street Band, joined by Win Butler and Régine Chassagne of Arcade Fire, on October 14, 2007, in Ottawa.
- The Williamsburg Salsa Orchestra released a Latin-flavored cover.
- The song was frequently covered by Fiction Family during their 2009 tour.
