= Black Mirror (song) =

Single by Arcade Fire

from the album Neon Bible
- Released: January 22, 2007
- Genre: Baroque pop; indie rock; post-punk revival
- Length: 4:11
- Label: Merge
- Songwriters: Will Butler, Win Butler, Régine Chassagne, Jeremy Gara, Tim Kingsbury, Richard Reed Parry

Arcade Fire singles chronology
"Wake Up" (2005)	"Black Mirror" (2007)	"Keep the Car Running" (2007)

"Black Mirror" is the first single by Canadian indie rock band Arcade Fire in the US from their second album Neon Bible (while "Keep the Car Running" is the first in the UK).

The single was first announced by the band on January 19, 2007 and was streamed on their official website under "Win's Scrapbook". It was released three days later on January 22 under Merge Records.

A music video, starring Mathieu Samaille, for Black Mirror was made by Olivier Groulx and Tracy Maurice, who is also responsible for the art direction on Neon Bible and Funeral. The interactive version, which allows the viewer to trigger instruments on or off, is the work of Vincent Morisset.

The British television series of the same name drew its title from that of the song.
