= Paper Heart (film) =

2009 American romantic comedy film

- Promotional film poster
- Directed by: Nicholas Jasenovec
- Written by: Nicholas Jasenovec; Lo Mutuc (Note: Credited as Charlyne Yi)
- Produced by: Sandra Murillo; Elise Salomon; Lo Mutuc
- Starring: Lo Mutuc; Michael Cera; Jake Johnson
- Cinematography: Jay Hunter
- Edited by: Ryan Brown
- Music by: Lo Mutuc; Michael Cera
- Distributed by: Overture Films
- Release dates: January 17, 2009 (Sundance); August 7, 2009 (United States)
- Running time: 88 minutes
- Country: United States
- Language: English
- Box office: $1.2 million

Paper Heart is a 2009 American romantic comedy film directed by Nicholas Jasenovec, who co-wrote the screenplay with Lo Mutuc. The film stars Mutuc and Michael Cera as fictionalized versions of themselves based on their rumored relationship, though Mutuc has said they never dated.

The plot for the film is based on Mutuc’s original idea of a documentary, which Jasenovec suggested would be accentuated with a fictional storyline. The film premiered at the 2009 Sundance Film Festival, where it won the Waldo Salt Screenwriting Award.

== Plot ==
Charlyne Yi embarks on a quest across America to answer, "What is love?". She and director Nick search for answers and advice about love.

Yi asks people on the street as well as celebrities like Seth Rogen, Demetri Martin, bikers, romance novelists, children, and scientists to share their opinions and understanding of love. Each interviewee answers, with diverse ideas as to what modern romance is, as well as various answers to the question of whether true love really exists.

Shortly after filming begins, Yi has a "chance meeting" with Michael Cera (playing a fictionalised version of himself) at a party. He begins to take an interest in her, and they get more comfortable with each other as the camera crew and director follow them around. As they go across the country, Yi and Cera begin dating.

Paper Heart is a docufiction; as such, there are only three actors in this film. Jake M. Johnson is the only one who plays a role in the film, a fictionalized version of Nicholas Jasenovec, the director of this film (the real Jasenovec does not appear on camera). Yi and Cera play fictionalized versions of themselves, while the remaining interview subjects and characters play themselves. Real couples talk about their own definitions of love. Stop-motion animation segments accompany some interview subjects' anecdotes about love.

The end credits feature a song performed by Charlyne Yi.

== Cast ==
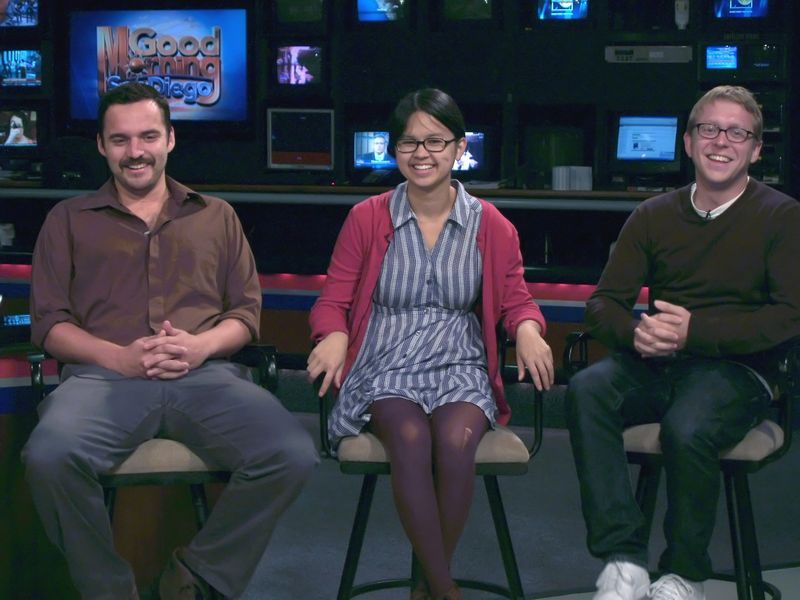
Jake Johnson, Charlyne Yi, and Nick Jasenovec

- Lo Mutuc as (a fictionalised version of) Lo Mutuc
- Michael Cera as (a fictionalised version of) Michael Cera
- Jake Johnson as Nicholas Jasenovec

Cameos

- Seth Rogen
- Demetri Martin
- Martin Starr
- Derek Waters
- Paul Rust
- Paul Scheer

== Release ==
Paper Heart premiered at the January 2009 Sundance Film Festival. It received a limited theatrical release on August 7, 2009 through October 29, 2009 in the United States and Canada. Its acculumated box office internationally and domestically was $1,296,971.

The film was released on DVD and Blu-ray on December 1, 2009, by Anchor Bay Entertainment.

"Everything with Charlyne, Mike and I was fictional, and everything on the road is real." — Jake Johnson

"a few of the interviews were people she stumbled into. Most of them a “casting director from a reality series” found for her. But the Cera romance thing she’s a little more cagey about." — Orlando Sentinel

"It's an extremely irritating, narcissistic picture, far inferior to Henry Jaglom's not dissimilar Someone to Love." — The Observer

"Originally it was going to be a traditional documentary, and my idea was just to capture true love stories" — Charlyne Yi

== Reception ==
Paper Heart holds a 60% approval rating on Rotten Tomatoes, based on 111 reviews. The website's critics consensus reads, "Equal parts charming and refreshing, Paper Heart is a quirky mockumentary led by the endearing Charlyne Yi." Metacritic, which uses a weighted average, assigned the film a score of 54 out of 100, based on 25 critics, indicating "mixed or average" reviews.

Roger Ebert gave the film 3 out of 4 stars, saying the question of how much of Yi and Cera's personas are real and how much is scripted give the film "an intriguing quality on top of its intrinsic appeal". Sarah Cohen of Time Out wrote, "On the surface, this is a perfectly serviceable cutesy rom-com. The segments featuring real people are genuinely affecting, but the realisation that everything else is probably being acted – that truth may be polluted by hoax – gives this otherwise lightweight film a sly, subversive edge." Elizabeth Weitzman of New York Daily News wrote, "Though often twee and self-congratulatory, Charlyne Yi’s biographical docudrama is just sweet enough to endear itself to those with a romantic bent." Katey Rich of Cinema Blend said "Paper Heart is also a strong argument against writing off quirk entirely, given how many small delights there are in its shaggy faux-documentary frame", and commented, "The quirk occasionally walks right up to the line of unbearable, but it's Paper Heart's unabashedly bared soul that saves it in the end."

== Soundtrack ==
Paper Heart: Original Soundtrack

Soundtrack album by Various Artists
- Released: August 4, 2009
- Length: 41:00
- Label: Lakeshore
- Producer: Alden Penner

The soundtrack of Paper Heart was released on August 4, 2009, by Lakeshore Records and contains music composed primarily by Michael Cera and Charlyne Yi. Alden Penner was the producer.

Track listing
No.	Title	Writer(s)	Length
1.	"The Beginning"	Michael Cera, Michael Cassady, Alden Penner, Adam Etinson	2:56
2.	"Hope"	Michael Cera, Charlyne Yi, Alden Penner	1:29
3.	"Mike Modrak"	Michael Cera	1:51
4.	"Now They're Really Getting to Know Each Other"	Michael Cera, Alden Penner	1:29
5.	"Children Are Ridiculous"	Michael Cera, Alden Penner	1:50
6.	"Symphony"	Michael Cera, Charlyne Yi, Alden Penner	1:16
7.	"Don & Sally"	Michael Cera, Mary Forrest, Jamie Wheeler, Alden Penner	1:44
8.	"New York City Theme"	Michael Cera, Alden Penner	0:41
9.	"Magic Perfume"	Charlyne Yi, Matt Davis	2:18
10.	"Charlyne vs Charlyne"	Michael Cera, Jeremy Konner	1:18
11.	"The 11th Arrondissement"	Zach Condon, Perrin Cloutier	2:07
12.	"Sid & Mary Beth"	Michael Cera, Michael Cassady, Alden Penner	2:23
13.	"Moon Waltz"	Michael Cera, Charlyne Yi, Alden Penner	1:06
14.	"Chivalrous Galloping For Thy Love"	Michael Cera, Alden Penner	1:23
15.	"Psychic?"	Michael Cera, Alden Penner	0:51
16.	"Lois & Sully"	Michael Cera, Alden Penner, Dan Ring, Charlyne Yi	1:51
17.	"Learning"	Michael Cera, Alden Penner	2:35
18.	"Flying Away"	Michael Cera	2:00
19.	"Creepy Town"	Michael Cera	0:34
20.	"Sprinkling"	Charlyne Yi	2:00
21.	"Twin Dream Phoenix"	Alden Penner, Aiden Jeffery, Michael Speleit, Nathan Gage, Marie-Claire Saindon, Nicholas Scribner, Ben Borden	3:10
22.	"Girl With The Microphone"	Michael Cera, Charlyne Yi, Mary Forrest, Alden Penner	2:05
