= Jasun Martz =

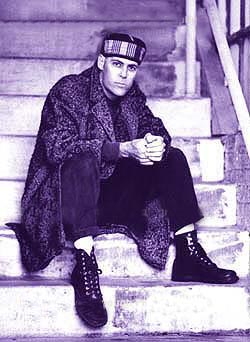

Background information
- Born: Jason Martz; 1953 (age 72–73)
- Origin: United States
- Genres: Contemporary classical, avant-garde, noise, rock, pop music
- Occupations: Record producer, composer, musician, artist, sculptor, creative director
- Instruments: Keyboards, percussion, harmonica
- Website: jasunmartz.com

Jasun Martz is an American record producer, composer, musician, fine artist, creative director, sculptor and inventor who has worked on several #1 internationally best-selling hit records but is probably best known for his contemporary classical symphonies. He has recorded with Michael Jackson, toured with Frank Zappa and helped arrange one of rock music's best-selling hits: "We Built This City" by Starship.

Also a renowned New York based painter and sculptor, Martz has lived in New York, Los Angeles and London, and has created and exhibited "raw expressionist" paintings and papier-mâché sculpture inspired by the subway passengers he encounters in each city. He collaborated with French modern master Jean Dubuffet (the founder of art brut) on Martz's critically acclaimed avant-garde/ contemporary classical symphony entitled The Pillory.

== Life and career ==
Martz began his music career at an early age in California, signing his first professional recording and publishing contract at the age of 15. An internationally known musician, composer and producer, he has recorded and toured with numerous celebrated entertainers. Millions have heard his recordings since he recorded on Michael Jackson's Dangerous and Bad albums. He played keyboards and synthesizers on the quadruple platinum #1 hit "Black or White" from Jackson's Dangerous album. It was later included on HIStory, Number Ones and three video/DVDs. He is the featured harmonica soloist on "Streetwalker", a Bad outtake which later appeared on Bad 25, as a bonus track on the 2001 Bad Special Edition reissue, and as the flip-side to the UK hit "Cry". Five of Michael Jackson's solo albums – Off the Wall, Thriller, Bad, Dangerous and HIStory are among the top-sellers of all time and Martz appears on three of the five releases. He has recorded and toured with Frank Zappa, the Japanese progressive rock group The Far East Family Band, and helped arrange Starship's #1 hit, "We Built This City" with Grammy award-winning producer Bill Bottrell. Bottrell has said Martz "...brought an immediacy and a rock & roll fire" to the Michael Jackson recordings. (Sound on Sound, August 2004).

In an interview in The New York Times in 2005, Martz said his music is sometimes very wild and not for the faint of heart. He composed and produced a contemporary classical symphony (his second) for the 115-member The Intercontinental Philharmonic Orchestra and Royal Choir. The Pillory/The Battle is a 2-CD set released in 2005 and 2007 and features 2½ hours of Mr. Martz's music. Searching for musical inspiration, Martz climbed to the refugio on Ecuador's Mount Cotopaxi – the world's tallest active volcano. When he descended the very steep slope, he tripped and began a tumble. Martz has said he then had an epiphany for the symphony. The music explores the Charles Darwin theory of evolution on the earth 200 million years into the future. It was reported in the New York Times that Mr. Martz said "after the tumble, a wild idea came to me of what the symphony should be."

Martz conducted a 40-piece orchestra, the Neoteric Orchestra, in his critically acclaimed first avant-garde symphony The Pillory. The CD features members of Frank Zappa's band Ruth Underwood, Eddie Jobson, has received hundreds of international reviews and has often been called a contemporary masterpiece. Billboard Magazine reviewed The Pillory as a "Top Album Pick" and it was featured in Canadian director Francois Miron's film Resolving Power (2001, FilmGrafix Studios, Montreal).

Martz has also composed for film, television and advertising.

Martz is also an internationally known New York based Creative Director in the beauty and fashion industries. He has created advertising campaigns for major brands such as Max Factor, Guess, Revlon, Procter & Gamble, Redken, Neutrogena, Rembrandt and many others.

Also an inventor, Martz is the creator and owner of many trademarks, copyrights and patents. He was most recently awarded a United States patent for his invention of a sponge storage and disinfecting device.

Martz studied at the University of California, Los Angeles; New York University; California State University, Northridge; Art Center College of Design and graduated with honors from the University of California, Santa Barbara with a bachelor's degree in the arts.

Jasun Martz has lived in New York since 1997.

== Exhibition history ==
- Love Thy Neighbor (group) Kenise Barnes Fine Art Gallery, Larchmont, New York, August – September 2011
- Harlem Art Project (group) Saatchi & Saatchi, New York City December 2003
- In Dim Light (solo) A five-year retrospective SPA, New York City October 2002
- Oblivious (solo) Gallery @ 135, New York City March 13 – April 1, 2001
- Under the Asphalt (solo) Siberia Gallery, New York City July 21 – August 20, 2000
- Faces in the Dark (solo) Sash Gallery, Glen Ridge, New Jersey, September 7 – October 30, 1999
- About Face (group) Los Angeles Municipal Art Gallery, Los Angeles July 10 – September 1, 1996
- Under (solo) LCA/LA Galleries, Los Angeles 1994
- Underground (solo) LAM Gallery, London, England 1986

== Discography ==
- Michael Jackson "Bad 25" (Sony/Columbia, 2012) featured solo harmonica
- The Arts, the Intercontinental Philharmonic Orchestra, "The Victory Fanfare" (Under The Asphalt, 2011) composer, conductor, producer
- The Intercontinental Philharmonic Orchestra. "Young" (The Seol Won Foundation, 2011), composer, conductor, producer
- The Arts (featuring Jasun Martz), "light" (Under The Asphalt, 2010) composer, producer, grand piano
- Sue Reed "Whose Hat Covers That Sundial?" (Under The Asphalt, 2007) producer, mellotron, drums, bass
- The Sin Circle (Under The Asphalt, 2007) producer, composer, musician
- Jasun Martz with The Intercontinental Philharmonic Orchestra and Royal Choir "The Pillory/The Battle" (Under The Asphalt, 2007, 2005) producer, composer, musician
- Jasun Martz with The Neoteric Orchestra "The Pillory" (Under The Asphalt, 2007) producer, composer, musician
- The Sin Circle "Freedom", "Alive and Lubricated" motion picture and soundtrack CD (Attack Filmworks, Canada, 2005) producer, composer, musician
- Michael Jackson "Number Ones" (Sony/Columbia, 2003) keyboards and synthesizers
- The Sin Circle "Freedom" (Attack Records, 2001) producer, composer, musician
- Michael Jackson "Bad" "Streetwalker" (Special edition, Sony/Columbia, 2001) featured solo harmonica
- Michael Jackson "Cry" "Streetwalker" (Special edition 12"/CD, Sony UK, 2001) featured solo harmonica
- Michael Jackson "Dangerous remastered" (Sony/Columbia, 2001) keyboards and synthesizers
- Michael Jackson "Greatest Hits" (Sony/Columbia, 2001) keyboards and synthesizer
- Michael Jackson "The Short Films/DVD" (Sony/Columbia, 2001) keyboards and synthesizer
- Michael Jackson "Video Greatest Hits- History/DVD" (Sony/Columbia, 2001) keyboards and synthesizer
- The Sin Circle "Everyone's an Idiot" (Sin Circle, 1999) producer, composer, musician
- Michael Jackson "HIStory" (Sony/Columbia, 1995) keyboards and synthesizer
- Beck "A Western Harvest Field by Moonlight (Fingerpaint, 1994) art director
- Jasun Martz "The Pillory" (Ad Perpetuam Memoriam, 1994) producer, composer, musician
- Michael Jackson "Dangerous" (Sony/Columbia, 1991) keyboards and synthesizer
- Michael Jackson "Dangerous" Video (director: John Landis, 1991) implemental percussion, vocals
- Del Rubio Triplets "Three gals, Three Guitars" (Cabazon, 1988) art director
- Starship "We Built This City On Rock and Roll" (RCA, 1985) co-arranger
- The Results (1984) bass, vocals
- Bone Cabal (Mystic Records, 1983) producer
- Jasun Martz/Eddie Jobson/John Luttrelle "in light, in dark in between"- The American Music Compilation (Eurock, 1982) producer, composer, piano
- Jasun "Won't let me go" (Neoteric Music, 1982) co-producer, composer, musician
- Jasun Martz and the Neoteric Orchestra "The Pillory" (Neoteric Music, 1981) producer, composer, musician
- The Far East Family Band "Live at the Troubadour" (RCA Victor Japan, 1979) keyboards, vocals, percussion
- Jasun Martz and the Neoteric Orchestra "The Pillory" (All Ears/ PBR International, 1978) producer, composer, musician
- Frank Zappa "Live in New York" (1977) synthesizer programmer, percussion & vocal overdubs
- American Zoo "Back street thoughts/What am I?"(Rena Records, 1968) drums, vocals
- American Zoo "Back street thoughts/What am I?"(Rena Records, 1968) drums, vocals
- American Zoo "Magdalena/Mr. Brotherhood?"(Rena Records, 1968) drums, vocals
- We the People "Who Am I?/Back Street Thoughts"(Rena Records, 1968) drums, vocals
- We the People "Feelings of my Emptiness/For no one to see"(Rena Records, 1967) drums, vocals

== Books ==
- Martz, Jasun (December 24, 2007). Jasun Martz. Jasun Martz (on Blurb).
- Martz, Jasun (November 29, 2008). All Roads lead to Returno. Jasun Martz (on Blurb).
- Martz, Jasun (April 6, 2012). Jasun Martz – Disintegration. Jasun Martz (on Blurb).
