= Lo Mutuc =

American comic actor (born 1986)

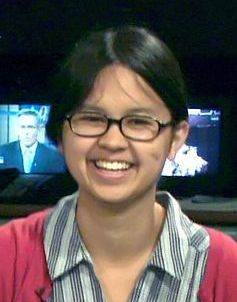
- Mutuc in 2009
- Born: Charlyne Amanda Yi; January 4, 1986 (age 40); Los Angeles County, California, U.S.
- Occupations: Actor; comedian; musician; writer
- Years active: 2006–present
- Spouse: Jet Elfman (m. 2016; div. 2018)

Lo Mutuc (Tagalog pronunciation: [ˈmutuk]; formerly Charlyne Amanda Yi; born January 4, 1986) is an American actor, comedian, musician, and writer, known for their role as Dr. Chi Park in the Fox medical drama House (2011–2012), and for providing the voices of the Rubies in the Cartoon Network animated series Steven Universe (2015–2018) and its epilogue series Steven Universe Future (2019–2020), Chloe Park in We Bare Bears (2015–2019), Alice in Summer Camp Island (2018–2023), Mai in Next Gen (2018), and Larry in StuGo (2025).

Mutuc's screenwriting debut, the feature film Paper Heart, won the Waldo Salt Screenwriting Award at the 2009 Sundance Film Festival. As a comedian, their performances include music, magic, games, and often audience participation.

== Early life ==
Mutuc was raised in Fontana, California. They are of Filipino, Mexican, and Korean descent. They attended the University of California, Riverside before leaving to pursue a full-time career in comedy. They had an early interest in performing while attending Bloomington High School and were involved in theatre.

== Career ==
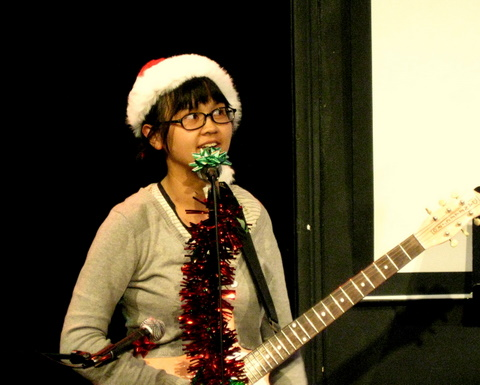
Performing in the Garfunkel and Oates Christmas Show at the UCB Theater in 2009

Mutuc began their career by performing in Bloomington, California. After high school, they performed shows in Los Angeles at The Steve Allen Theater, and The Upright Citizens Brigade Theatre. In 2005 and 2006 they performed in the New York Comedy Festival, and in 2007 HBO's U.S. Comedy Arts Festival in Aspen, Colorado.

Mutuc’s film debut was in Judd Apatow's 2007 film Knocked Up. In 2008, Mutuc performed as part of the Apatow for Destruction Live comedy show at Montreal's Just for Laughs Festival.

In the 2009 film Paper Heart, a "hybrid documentary" in which Mutuc served as both executive producer and co-writer, they starred as a fictional version of themself, alongside Michael Cera.

Mutuc was chosen as one of Venus Zine's "25 under 25" women for 2009.

They appeared alongside Saturday Night Live cast member Fred Armisen in the 2009 music video for the song "Rabbit Habits" by Philadelphia experimental band Man Man.

Mutuc and Paul Rust formed the band The Glass Beef. The duo shares one electric guitar, and both sing lead vocals. In 2006, they released their debut album, The Farewell Album, produced by John Spiker, bassist of Tenacious D.

Mutuc was featured in the video "Song Away" by Hockey. In 2013, Mutuc and Jet Elfman formed the band Sacred Destinies.

From October 2011 to May 2012, Mutuc starred in the Fox television series House as Dr. Chi Park, a young doctor with anger management issues.

== Non-profit work ==
Mutuc has been involved with Oxfam America since 2010, working to raise awareness about poverty and hunger worldwide. Mutuc started the non-profit Caring is Cool in 2011, and hosted a benefit show to raise money for the organization.

== Personal life ==
Mutuc describes their gender identity as genderfluid. They use they/them pronouns.

In 2016, Mutuc married Jet Elfman, their Sacred Destinies bandmate. After a year of separation, Elfman filed for divorce in April 2018.

In 2018, through Twitter, Mutuc accused Marilyn Manson of sexual harassment on the set of House. That year, Amber Tamblyn said of her husband David Cross: "Basically he was rightfully accused of doing something racist to the comedian [Lo Mutuc]", following tweets that Mutuc had posted on the subject in 2017. Cross asked Mutuc to reach out via direct message to discuss the situation. He later publicly apologized to Mutuc, claiming that he would "never intentionally hurt someone like that".

In 2021, Mutuc spoke out about their experience with James Franco, specifically discussing their efforts to quit his 2017 film, The Disaster Artist, after learning of the sexual misconduct allegations against him. Mutuc also criticized Seth Rogen for enabling Franco's behavior and continuing to work with him following the allegations.

Around 2023, Mutuc began using the name Lo Mutuc; they later publicly announced their name change in 2024.

In 2024, Mutuc said that while filming Time Bandits for Apple TV+, they were assaulted and injured by a male actor. A source with knowledge from the Time Bandits set contradicted this version of events, telling The Hollywood Reporter that the alleged assault involved a fellow actor bumping into Mutuc and then picking them up during a scene where actors were running. Multiple individuals and witnesses were interviewed as part of an investigation into their claims but did not substantiate them.

== Filmography ==
=== Film ===
Film work by Lo Mutuc
Year	Title	Role	Notes	Ref.
2007	Knocked Up	Jodi		
2008	Cloverfield	Party Goer		
2008	Semi-Pro	Wheelchair Jody		
2009	Paper Heart	Charlyne Yi	Nominated – Comedy Film Award for Best Actress	
2009	All About Steve	Young Protester		
2010	Fast	Donna Fast	Two-minute video short	
2012	This Is 40	Jodi		
2014	The Last Time You Had Fun	Betty		
2016	Nerdland	Becky	Voice	
2017	The Disaster Artist	Safoya		
2017	Literally, Right Before Aaron	Claire		
2017	The Lego Ninjago Movie	Terri IT Nerd	Voice	
2018	Puppet Master: The Littlest Reich	Nerissa		
2018	Next Gen	Mai Su	Voice; Nominated – Annie Award for Voice Acting in a Feature Production	
2018	Second Act	Ariana		
2019	Always Be My Maybe	Ginger		
2019	Goldie	Goldie	Voice, short	
2019	Steven Universe: The Movie	Ruby	Voice, television film	
2019	VHYes	Lou		
2019	Jexi	Elaine		
2020	Trolls World Tour	Pennywhistle	Voice	
2020	We Bare Bears: The Movie	Chloe Park	Voice	
2021	Happily	Gretel		
2021	The Mitchells vs. the Machines	Abbey Posey	Voice	
2022	My Father's Dragon	Magda	Voice	

=== Television ===
Television work by Lo Mutuc
Year	Title	Role	Notes	Ref.
2006	Help Me Help You	Charlyne	Episode: "The Sheriff"	
2007	30 Rock	Grace Park	Episode: "The C Word"	
2007	Cold Case	Dorky Girl	Episode: "Stand Up and Holler"	
2007	Powerloafing	Executive Assistant		
2008	Miss Guided	Karey	Episode: "Pool Party"	
2011	Love Bites	Sex Shop Manager	Episodes: "Unaired Pilot" & "Firsts"	
2011–2012	House	Dr. Chi Park	21 episodes	
2015	Looking	Cashier	Episode: "Looking for a Plot"	
2015–2018	Steven Universe	Ruby, various Rubies, Cluster	Voice, recurring role (12 episodes)	
2015–2019	We Bare Bears	Chloe Park	Voice, recurring role (18 episodes)	
2016	Love	Cori	3 episodes	
2016	Jane the Virgin	Angela	Episode: "Chapter Thirty-Nine"	
2016	Future-Worm!	Zoe	Voice, episode: "Bug vs. the Babysitter"	
2017	Twin Peaks	Ruby	Episode: "Part 15"	
2017	Danger & Eggs	Layla	Voice, episode: "Keep Off the Grass/Pennies"	
2017	Room 104	Gracie	Episode: "FOMO"	
2018	Lucifer	Ray-Ray / Azrael	2 episodes	
2018	DIY	Eli	Voice, TV short	
2018–2023	Summer Camp Island	Alice Fefferman	Voice, main role (22 episodes)	
2019–2020	Steven Universe Future	Ruby, Eyeball Ruby, Ruby Bodyguards	Voice, recurring role (5 episodes)	
2020	Good Girls	Lucy	2 episodes	
2021	Tig n' Seek	Georgia	Voice, episode: "Must Love Bugs"	
2022	Amphibia	The Guardian	Voice, episode: "The Hardest Thing"	
2022	We Baby Bears	Alice Fefferman	Voice, episode: "Witches"	
2022	Guillermo del Toro's Cabinet of Curiosities	Charlotte Xie	Episode: "The Viewing"	
2024	Time Bandits	Judy	Mutuc withdrew halfway through filming	
2025	StuGo	Larry	Voice, main role	

== Books ==
Books by Lo Mutuc
Year	Title	Type
2015	Oh the Moon	Text/Image hybrid
2019	You Can't Kill Me Twice (So Please Treat Me Right)	Poetry
