= Renata Morales =

Mexican-Canadian visual artist

Renata Morales is a multidisciplinary visual artist born in Mexico City and now living and working in Montreal, Canada. She has worked with Arcade Fire and directors Denis Villeneuve, Pedro Pires, Anton Corbijn, Vincent Morisset, and Spike Jonze. Her costumes have also been seen on Grimes,Catherine Pogonat, Allie X and Yelle.
