= François Miron =

French-Canadian experimental filmmaker

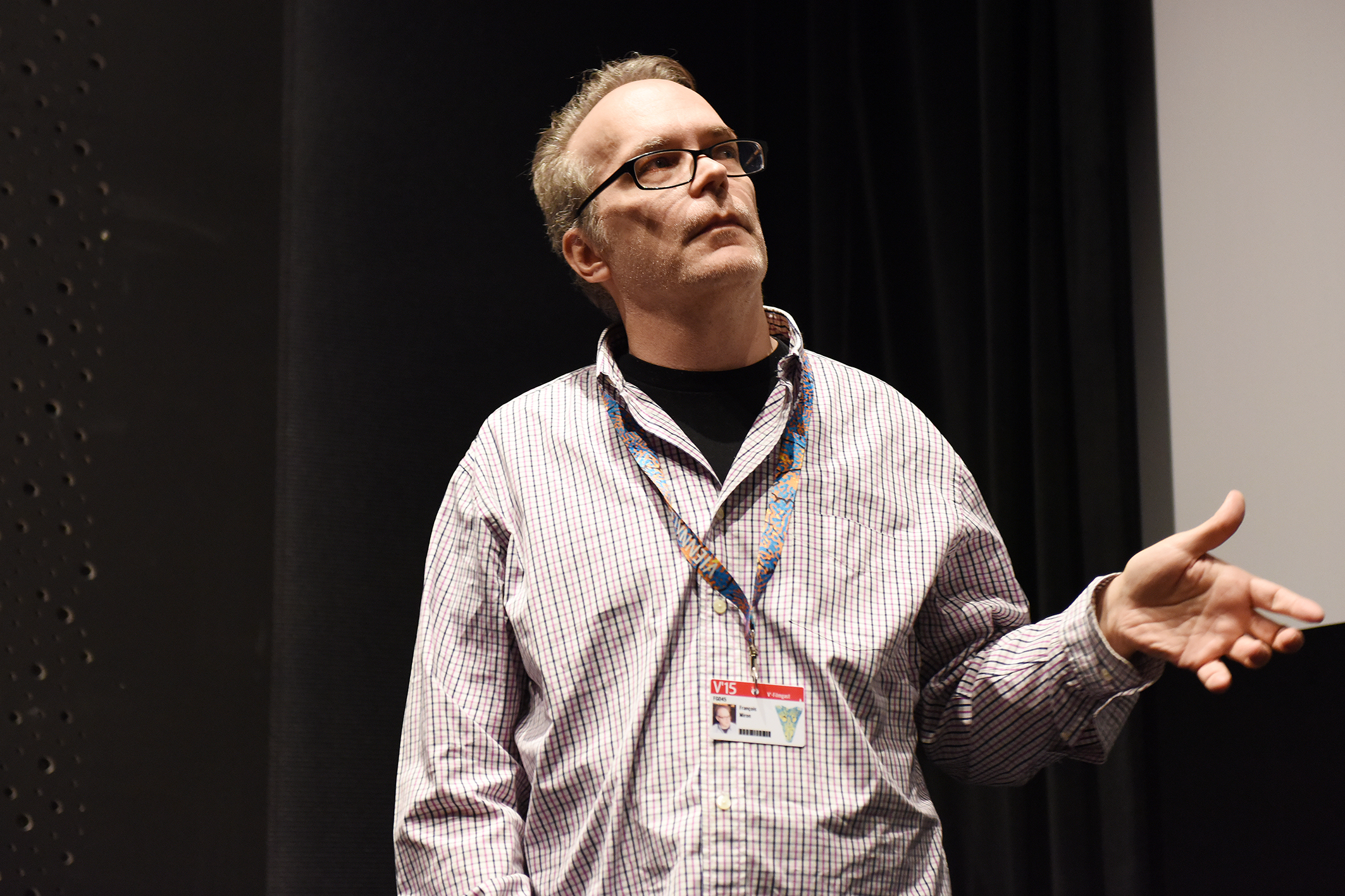
- Francois Miron in Austria at Viennale 2015 Picture by Alexi Pelekanos

François Miron (born 1962) is a French-Canadian experimental filmmaker also working in documentary and fiction.

== Early life ==
Miron was born in Montreal in 1962.

== Education ==
He obtained a BFA from Concordia University in 1987 and an MFA from The School of the Art Institute of Chicago in 1990 (he received a full merit scholarship).

== Filmmaking career ==
Miron started making Super-8 Collage films in 1982, inspired by the cut-up technique William S. Burroughs, soon shifting to 16mm and 35mm. His early body of work consists of found footage manipulation through optical printing and abstract cinematography of industrial landscapes. His abstract work has lately been shifting into more "traditional" narrative cinema and documentary, although a strong psychedelic and surreal influence still is present. Miron still makes short experimental films while working on his feature films or in between them. Most of his films have been exhibited worldwide and have won several awards.

His early films are in the tradition of Pat O'Neill who was the pioneer of experimental optical printing films in the 1960s and 1970s and is still active to this day. Other links have been made to Paul Sharits, Stan Brakhage, Norman McLaren and in painting to Jackson Pollock

== Selected works ==
- "4X Horizontal, 4X Vertical" 1986
  In a room, Miron piles boxes against a wall film screen. The images projected on it quickly rush together:automobile accidents, Tuscan landscapes, an injured man, medical experiments intercut with smoking factories, a sleeping face. Miron moves the boxes about constantly, as if feeding a burning fire. Awarded Best Experimental Film Montreal World Film Festival (Student Section).

At the original screening of the film at The World Film Festival, the sound was so loud that the projection booth window broke; the projectionist stopped the projection but the judges insisted that they see the film again. Documentary filmmaker Peter Wintonick wrote an article about this in Cinema Canada. He also interviewed Miron about his filmmaking activities (the magazine was defunct in 1989). The Conservatoire D'Art Cinematographique in Montreal requested that the film be put in their archives. There is also a print at The Canadian Film Archives in Ottawa.

- "What Ignites Me, Extinguishes me" 1990
  Shot in abandoned factories of Chicago and using complex color separation method to illustrate isolation and despair, the film won Best Experimental at the Illinois Film & Video Artist Film Festival Chicago in 1990 the film was called "visually intoxicating" in the Chicago Reader by respected film critic Jonathan Rosenbaum.
- "The Evil Surprise" 1994
  A found footage collage with numerous optical printing manipulations to create a comment on social conditioning, won Best Experimental Film Prize at the Ann Arbor Film Festival in 1994 Christopher Potter from The Ann Arbor News called it "a supercharged explosion of topical images and sound..."

- "Resolving Power" 2001
  An exploration on the industrial society and paranoia the film uses "The Pillory" composed by Jasun Martz
- "The 4th Life" 2007
  A feature-length surreal thriller shot in 35mm featuring sound design by David Kristian and music by Electric Wizard

- "Hymn To Pan" 2008
  A visual dance interpretation of the Aleister Crowley poem by the same name, won the "Prix à la création artistique du Conseil des arts et des lettres du Quebec" (Artistic Creation Award from the Quebec Arts Council) this film opened the 45th edition of the Ann Arbor Film Festival and was featured in a special program at The Toronto International Film Festival

Aside from those, Miron has created over 15 films since 1982.

In 2003 he was ranked 4th best filmmaker of Montreal by The Montreal Mirror 14th annual reader's poll

In 2008 he won a Juno Award for his photographic work on the cover of the Arcade Fire CD: Neon Bible.

In 2007 he started working on a feature-length documentary about avant-garde filmmaker Paul Sharits. The film was completed, and the world premiere took place at The 44th International Film Festival Rotterdam 21 January – 1 February 2015. The film has then been featured in several festivals over the world: Japan, Korea, Israel, France etc. The film won the top award (FILAF D'Or) at FILAF 2015 International Art Book and Film Festival in Perpignan, France.

== Teachings ==
Since 1993, François Miron has been teaching at The Mel Hoppenheim School of Cinema at Concordia University in Montreal, there he created an optical printing course.

With the rise of new technologies and the near death of celluloid-based film, after a near 20-year run, the course disappeared in 2012.

Miron is still very active as a teacher, teaching basic filmmaking and also advanced cinematography among other courses.
