= Petite Église =

Disciples of the priest Cornelis Stevens

The Petite Église (French pronunciation: [pətit eɡliz], "Little Church"; Dutch: Stevenisten, lit. 'Stevenists') was a constellation of separate groups of French and Belgian Roman Catholics who separated from the Catholic Church in France because they opposed the reintegration of secularised priests by the Concordat of 1801 between Pope Pius VII and Napoleon Bonaparte. They were considered schismatic. One modern estimate gives its number of adherents as high as 100,000 at one time. The various communities were mostly independent from each others and adherents in each group were known by a different names. The communities declined slowly over time as their leading priests aged and died. The last enfarinés of Aveyron formally submitted to the Bishop of Saint-Flour in 1911. But the Petite Église of Poitou still had at least 3000 adherents in the 50s and an attempt was made in 1996 by John Paul II to restore communion with the group.
