= Brendan Reed =

American drummer

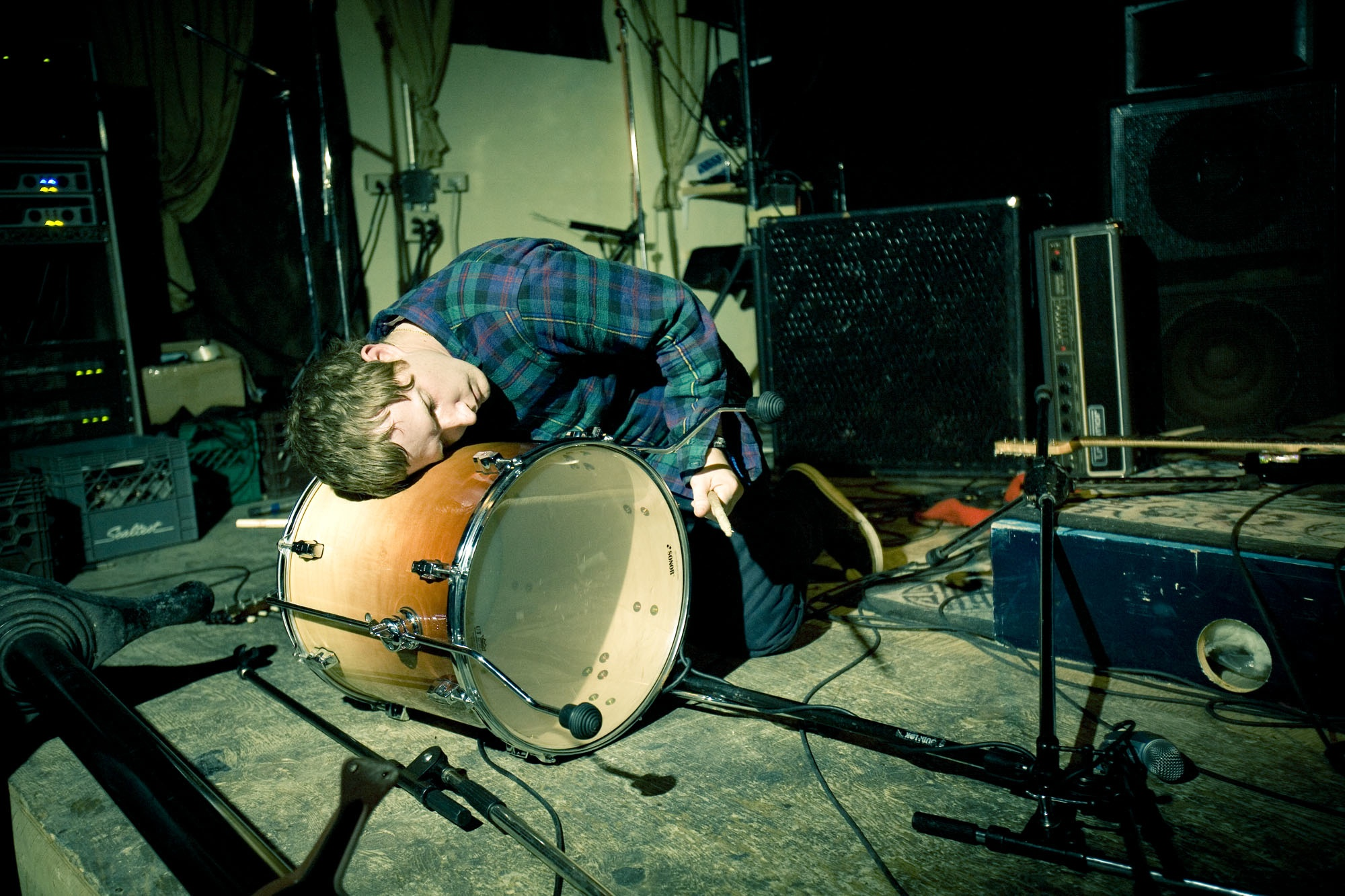
- Brendan Reed

Background information
- Also known as: Van Calhoun, Flood Reed, Brains Brogan
- Born: Brendan Reed; Williamsburg, Virginia, United States
- Occupations: Musician; filmmaker; artist
- Instruments: Vocals; guitar; drums; bass; synthesizers
- Labels: Constellation; Alien 8; Merge; Villa Villa Nola Records; Escalator Records

Brendan Reed is an American multi-instrumentalist, composer, artist, and film-maker from Williamsburg, Virginia known for his short films, recordings, compositions, and performances with numerous bands from Montreal, Quebec and Williamsburg, Virginia.

== Career ==
Uneducate Evil released three EPs (featuring six songs each). Each of these EP's were officially untitled but were informally listed and referenced according to the date they were recorded: 6/11/97, 7/3/97, and 9/16/97. All three EPs were compiled onto CD by Villa Villa Nola in 2000 in a release called Secret Trail. Uneducate Evil often performed at local benefits and shows organized by the small community of young musicians sharing recording gear, live sound equipment, and the all-ages performance space at The Shed. Uneducate Evil rarely performed outside of Virginia but was invited to perform at Oberlin Conservatory of Music (Oberlin, Ohio) in May and July 1996.

The Spartans (1997–1999) consisted of Reed on drums and vocals, Lauginiger on bass guitar and vocals, and Quinn Taylor on guitar and vocals. The group often performed as The Spartans (Volcano River). The band made numerous live recordings and self-released one record (Volcano River in 1998). They rarely performed outside of Virginia but were invited to play at the Rhode Island School of Design on May 1, 1998.

Brendan Reed was an early member of Arcade Fire, joining the band in 2001. He contributed to the eponymous EP, but quit the band in 2003 onstage, during an encore, following an argument with Win Butler.

In 2002, Reed founded Les Angles Morts with Myles Broscoe, Owain Lawson, and Kyle Fostner, an instrumental group that composed and performed scores for short videos created by the band members. The band released one album, entitled What's Real? (2005) on Blue Skies Turn Black Records, and numerous untitled 3" mini CDs. The band toured the eastern United States, Quebec, and Ontario. Reed briefly recorded and performed under the name Secrets of Mana in 2007.

In 2002, Reed founded Let Lowns with guitarist Victoria Morrison. Let Lowns self-released one album (later released by Villa Villa Nola) called Humbilical Horde (2004). Personal stories about Reed are featured in Jeff Miller's book, Ghost Pine and the Wolf issue of the Ghost Pine Zine.

In 2007, Reed played bass guitar, guitar, and drums in Think About Life. He wrote the lyrics and sang lead vocals on Bastian and The Boar.

== Discography ==
- Robes of Alchemy Clad (1989)
- Robes of Alchemy Lod (1990)
- Robes of Alchemy Dripper Mons (1992)
- Evil Colossal Self Serving EP (1994)
- The Buttons Always Home Never Home (1997)
- The Spartans Volcano River (1998)
- Uneducate Evil Secret Trail (1998)
- The Buttons Pups Plus (1999)
- Nocarsgo Fiery Foe Postulate II (2000)
- Arcade Fire Arcade Fire (2002)
- The Unicorns Who Will Cut Our Hair When We're Gone? (2003)
- Let Lowns Humbilical Horde (2004)
- Les Angles Morts What's Real? (2005)
- Think About Life Think About Life (2006)
- Nocarsgo Maryland Overgrow (2006)
- Think About Life Black Champagne (2007)
- Clues Clues (2009)

== Filmography ==
- WMOK (2000)
- Black Lion Horror Cave (2002)
- Search for Nazi Gold (2003)
- How Where the Redfern Grows Was Ruined for Ry Russo Young (2005)
- Forever Cuts (2006)
- Finish Hymn (2006)
- Cobra (A Choir with No Voice) (2008)
- Gorge On! Sugarcube (2010)
- Hat Contest (2010)
- Pulpit (2010)
- Once Touching Now (2011)
