= List of mezzo-sopranos in non-classical music =

The mezzo-soprano is the middle female voice and the most common of the female singing voices, which tends to dominate in non-classical music, with vocal range that typically lies between the A below "middle C" (C_{4}) to the A two octaves above (i.e. A_{3}–A_{5}). In the lower and upper extremes, some mezzo-sopranos may extend down to the F below middle C (F_{3}) and as high as "high C" (C_{6}). The mezzo-soprano voice (unlike the soprano voice) is strong in the middle register and weaker in the head register, resulting in a deeper tone than the soprano voice.

The term mezzo-soprano was developed in relation to classical and operatic voices, where the classification is based not merely on the singer's vocal range but also on the tessitura and timbre of the voice. For classical and operatic singers, their voice type determines the roles they will sing and is a primary method of categorization. In non-classical music, singers are primarily defined by their genre and their gender not their vocal range. When the terms soprano, mezzo-soprano, contralto, tenor, baritone, and bass are used as descriptors of non-classical voices, they are applied more loosely than they would be to those of classical singers and generally refer only to the singer's perceived vocal range.

The following is a list of singers in country, popular music, jazz, heavy metal, classical-crossover, and musical theatre who have been described as mezzo-sopranos.

== List of names ==
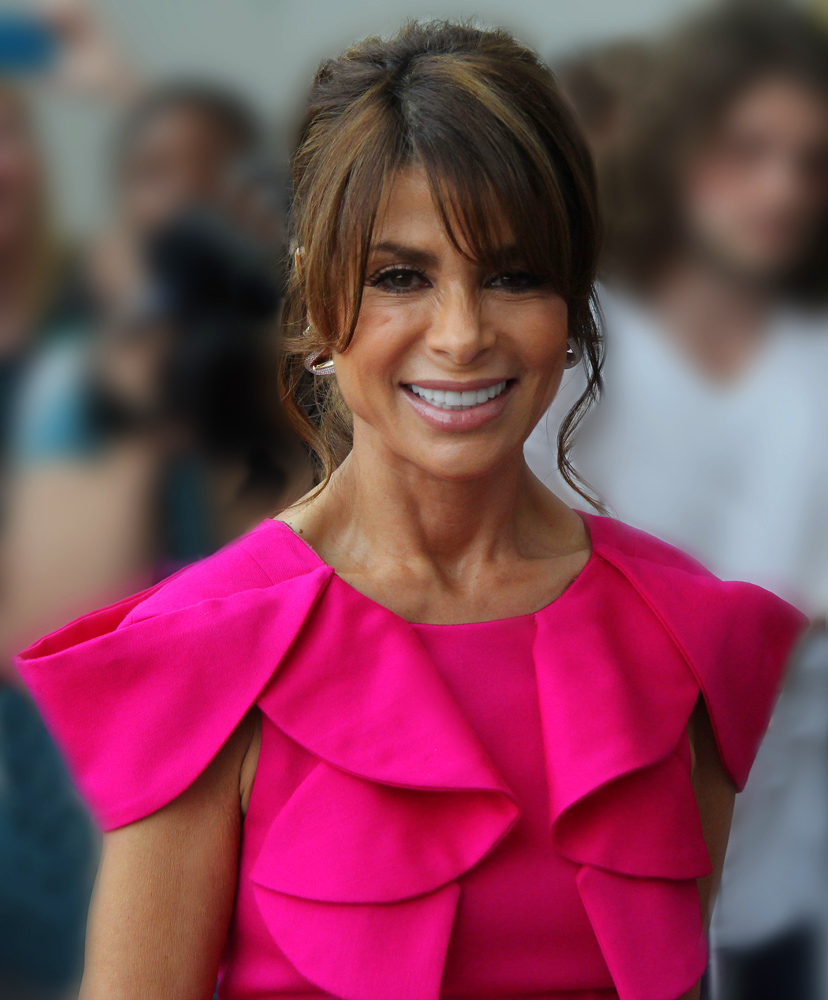
Paula Abdul

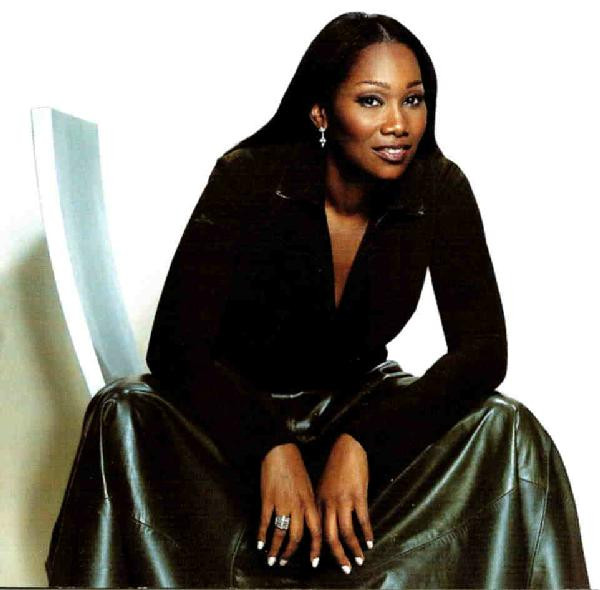
Yolanda Adams

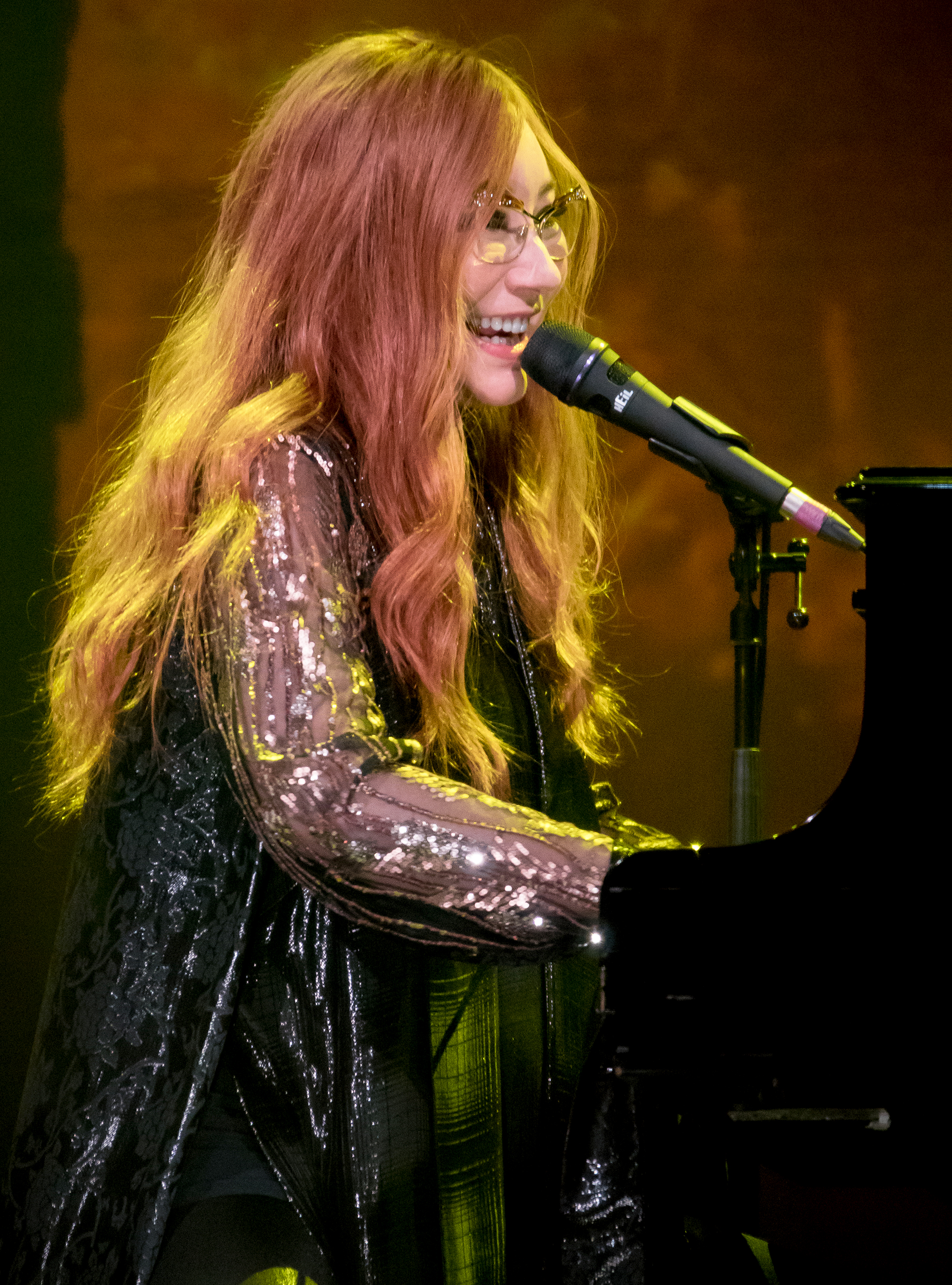
Tori Amos

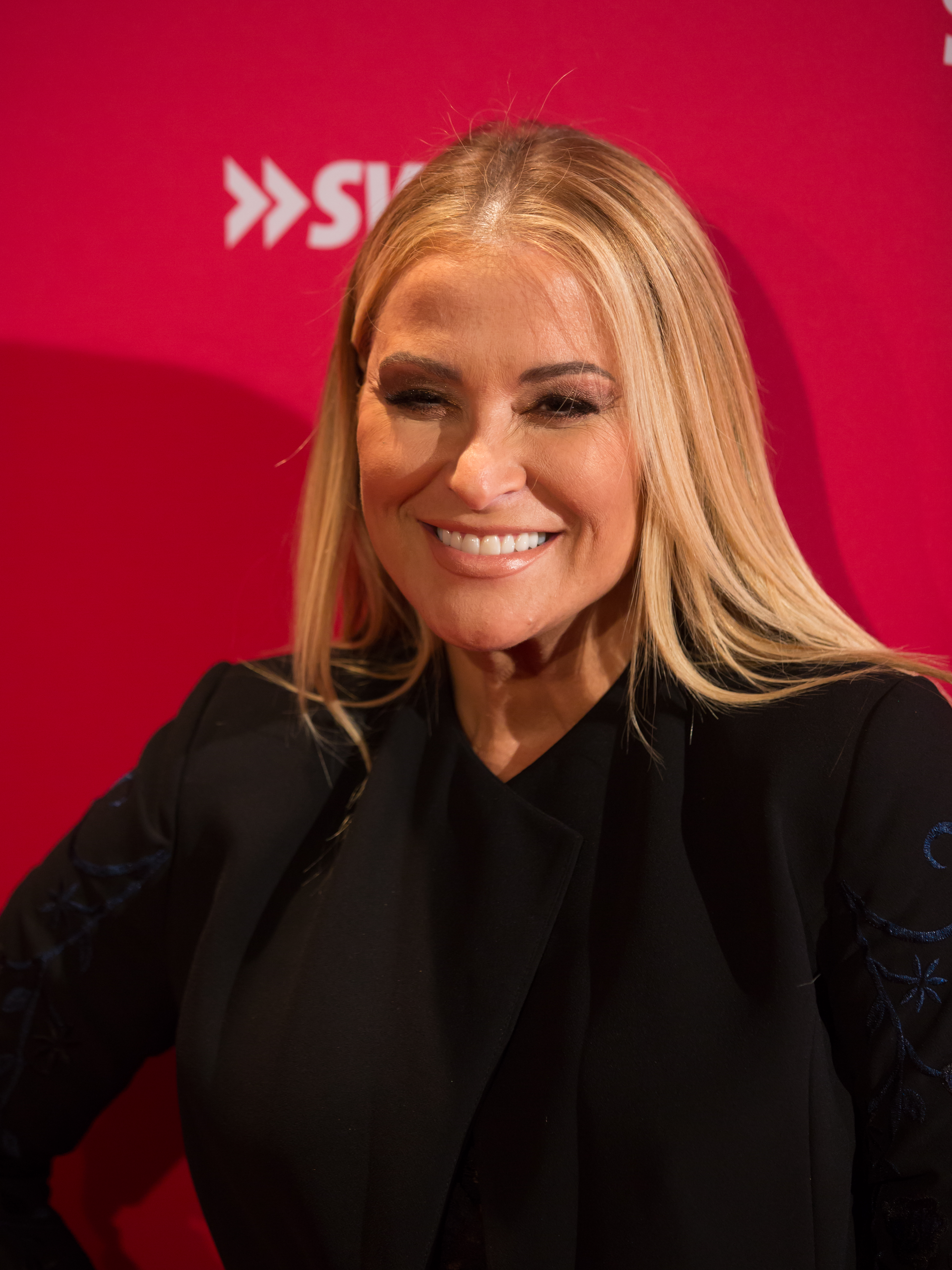
Anastacia

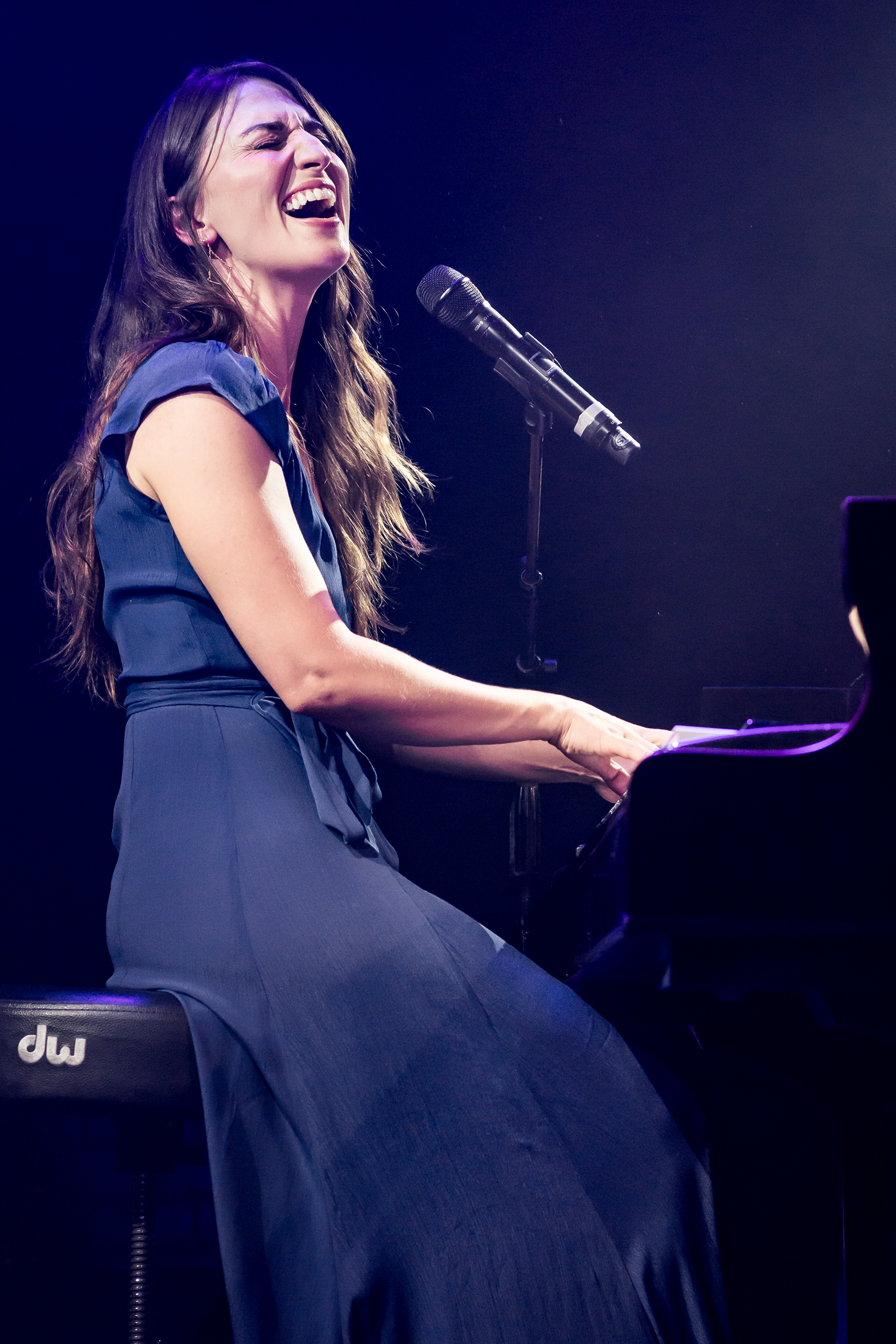
Sara Bareilles

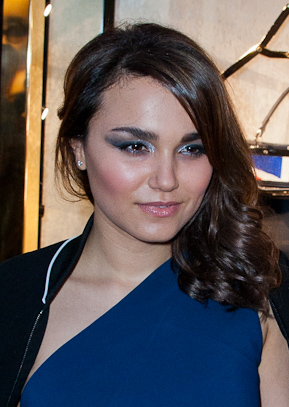
Samantha Barks

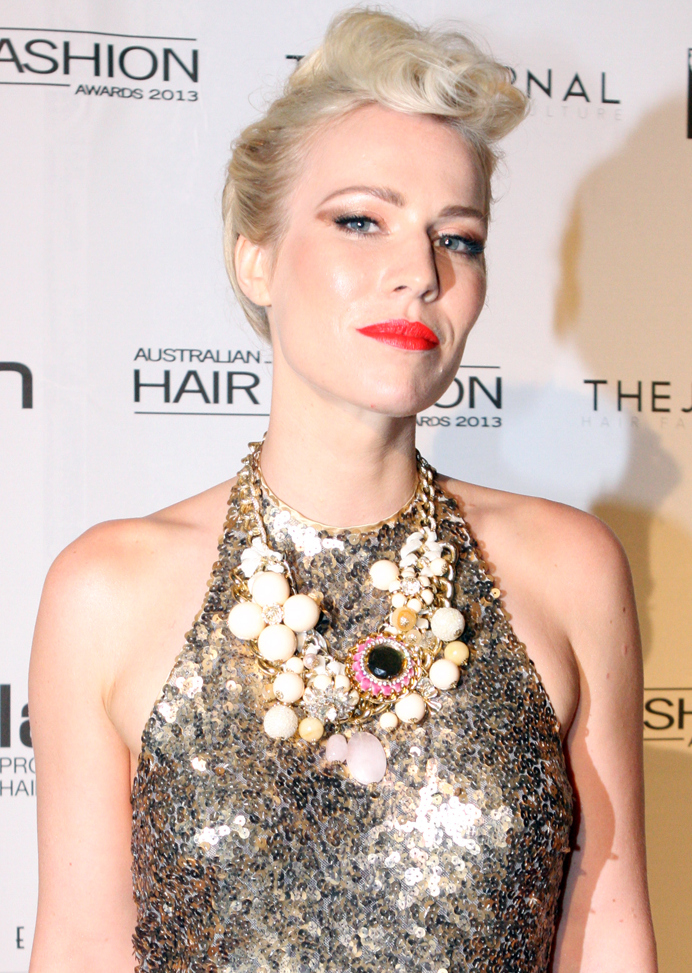
Natasha Bedingfield

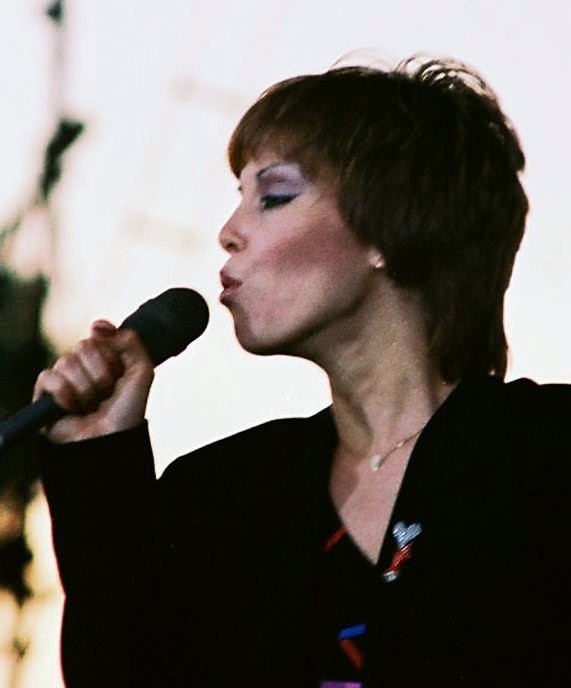
Pat Benatar

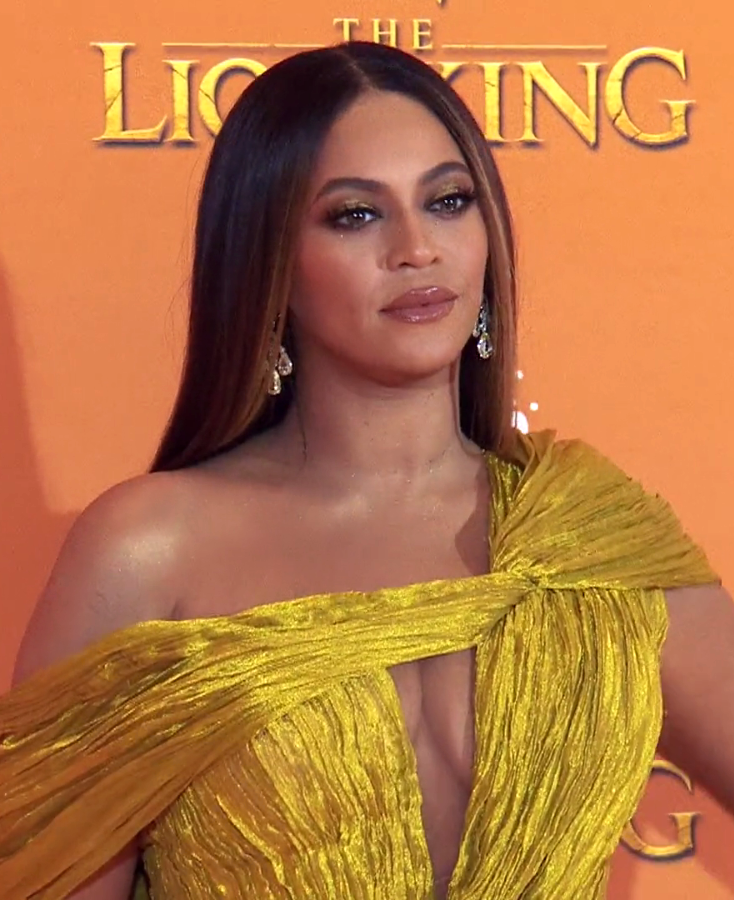
Beyoncé

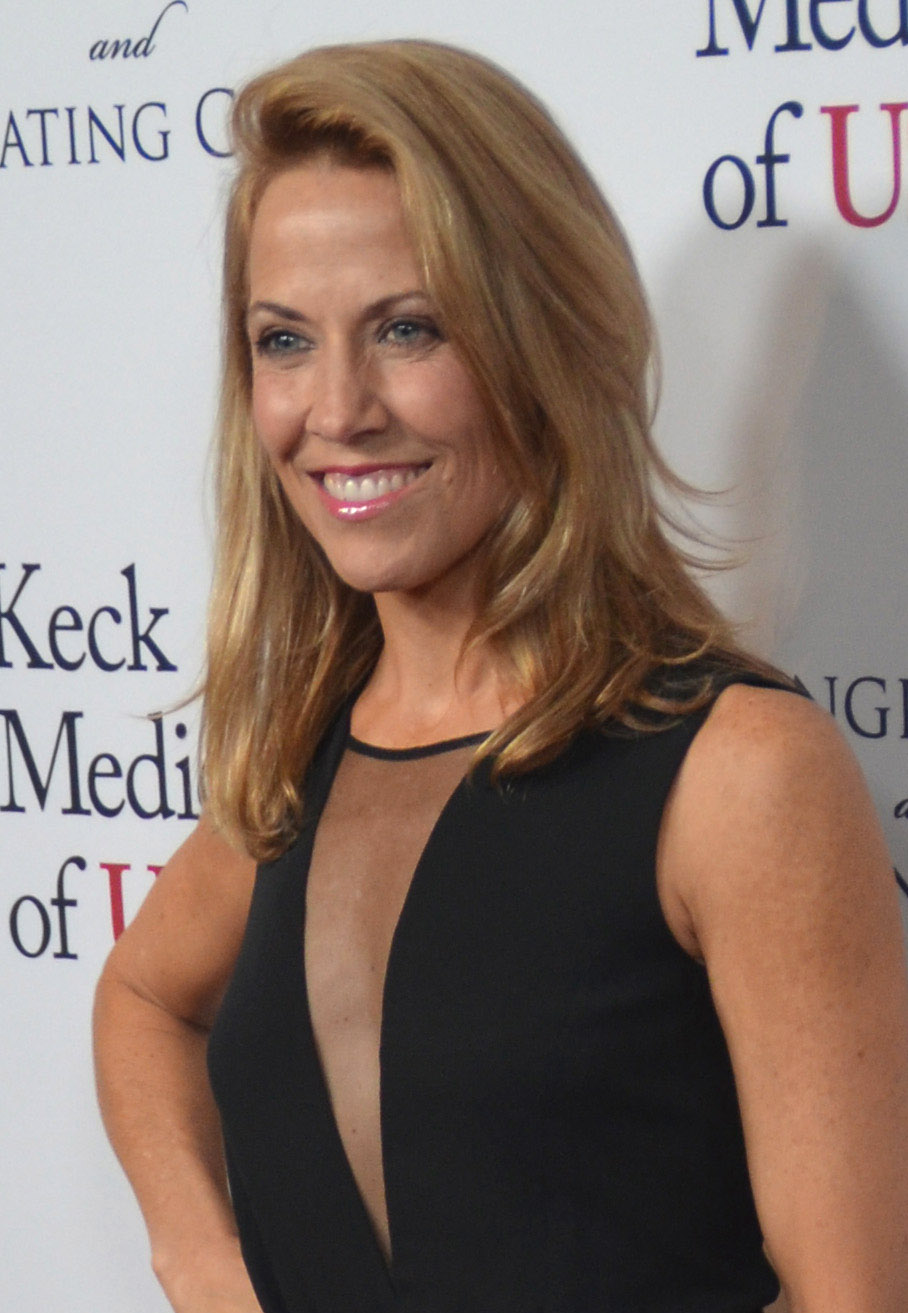
Sheryl Crow

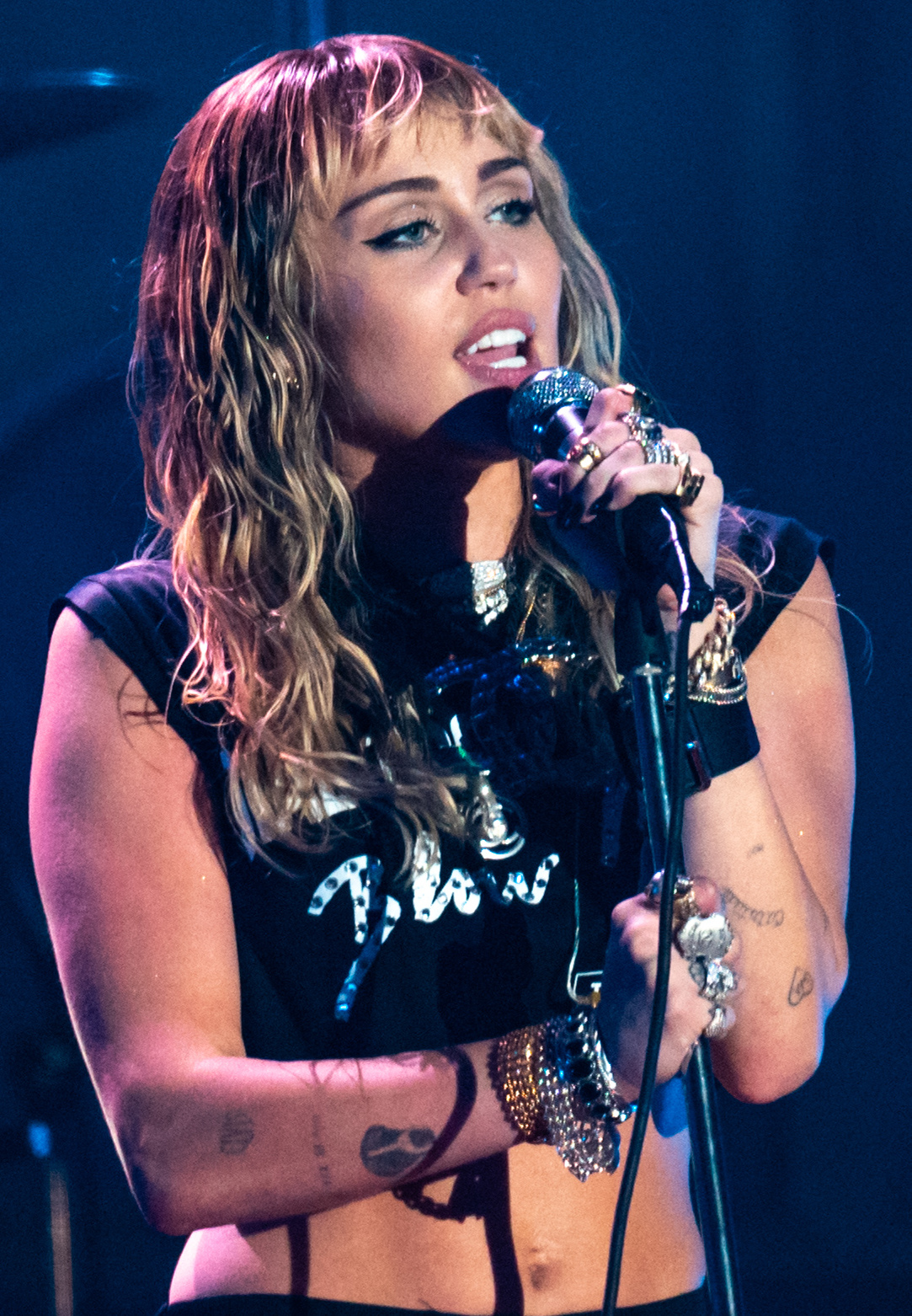
Miley Cyrus

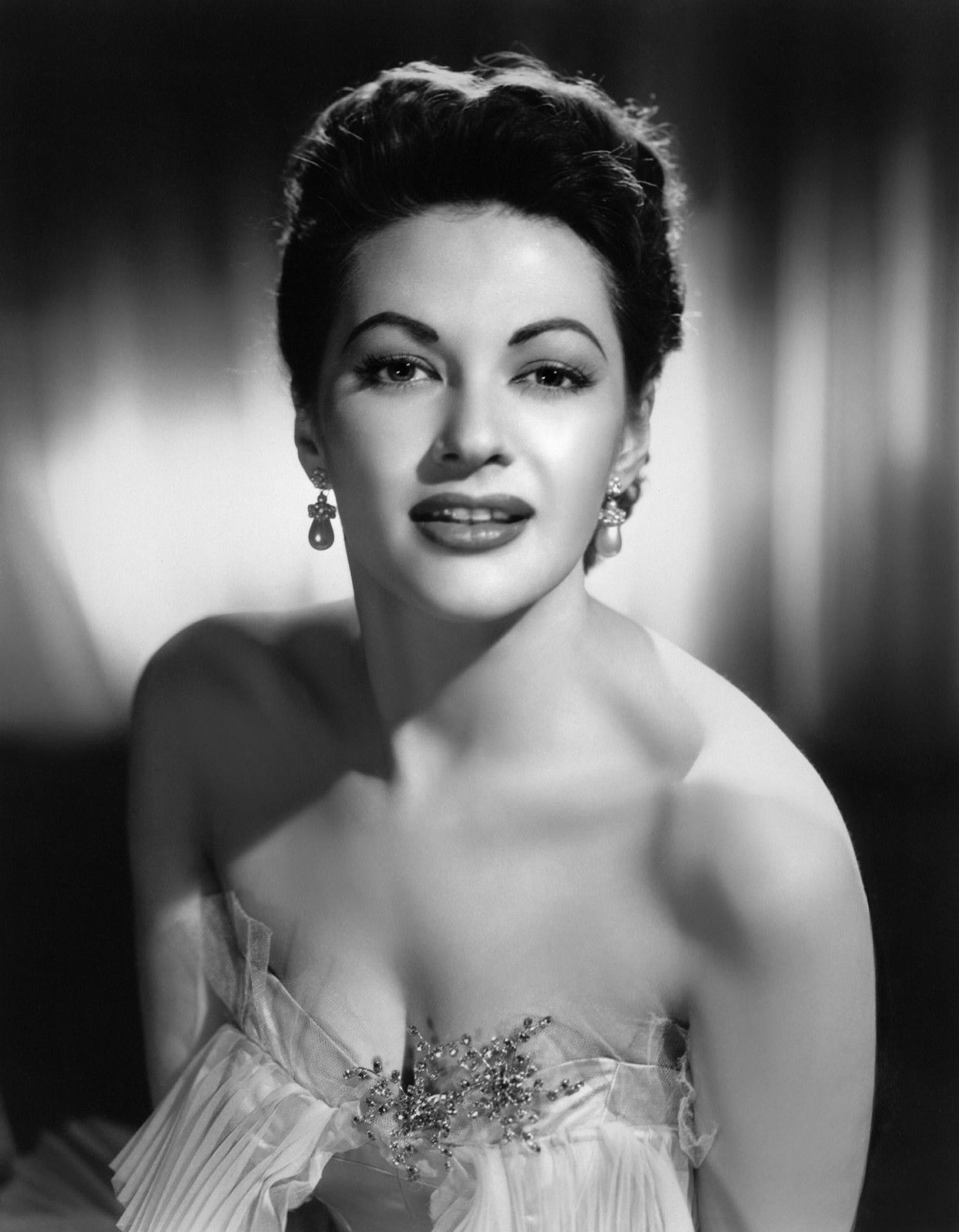
Yvonne De Carlo

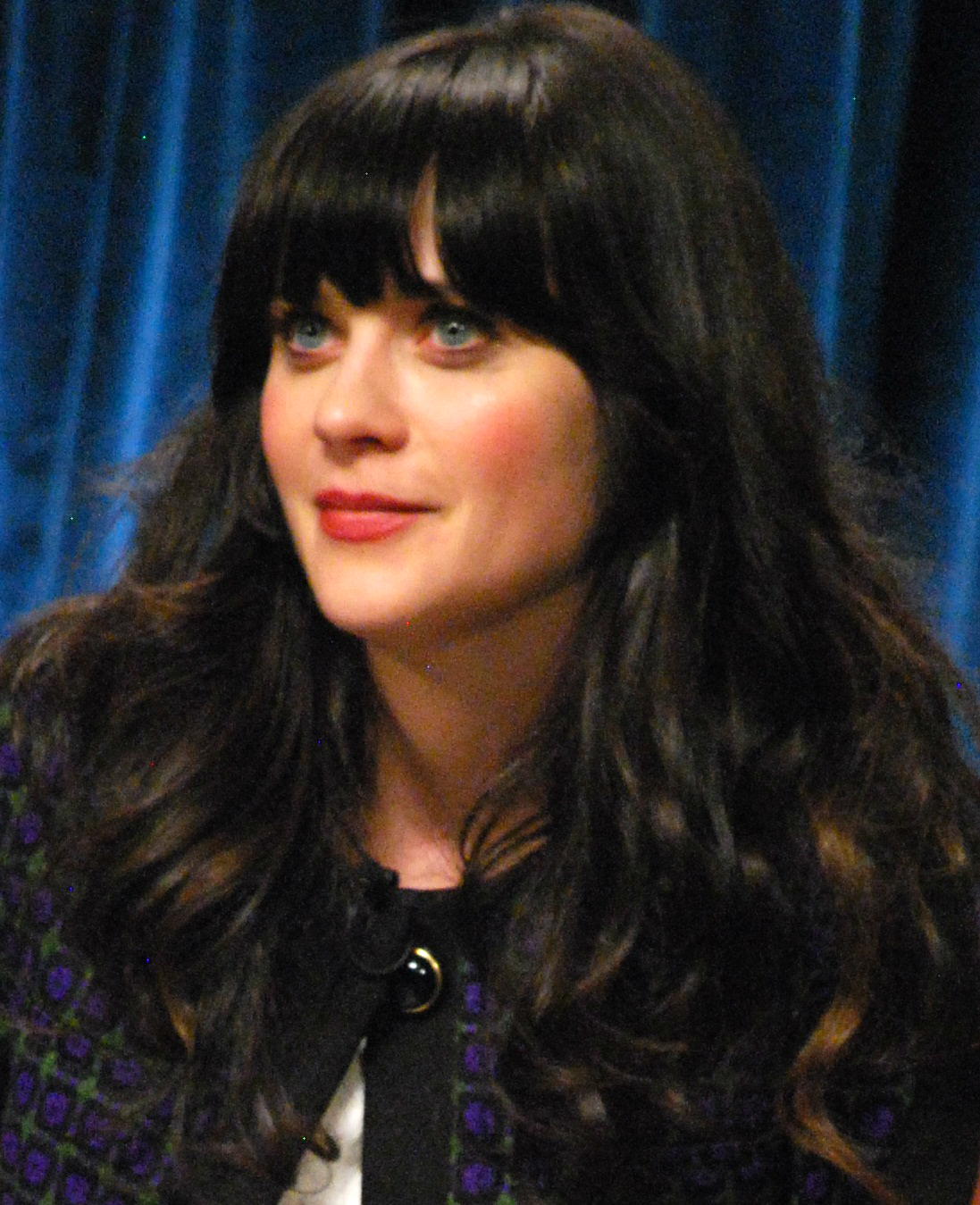
Zooey Deschanel

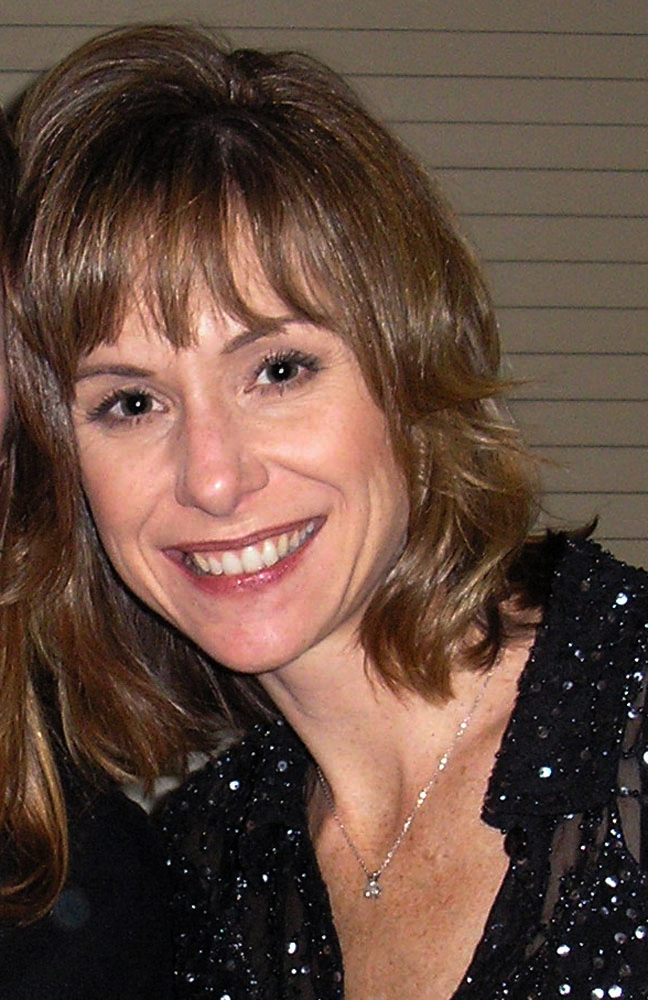
Susan Egan

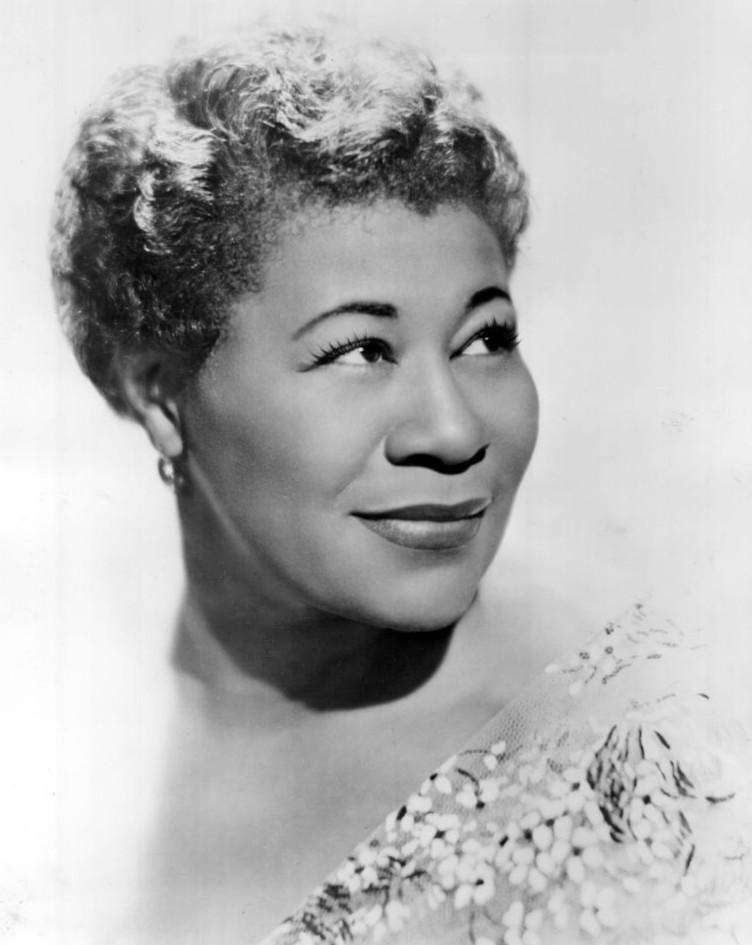
Ella Fitzgerald

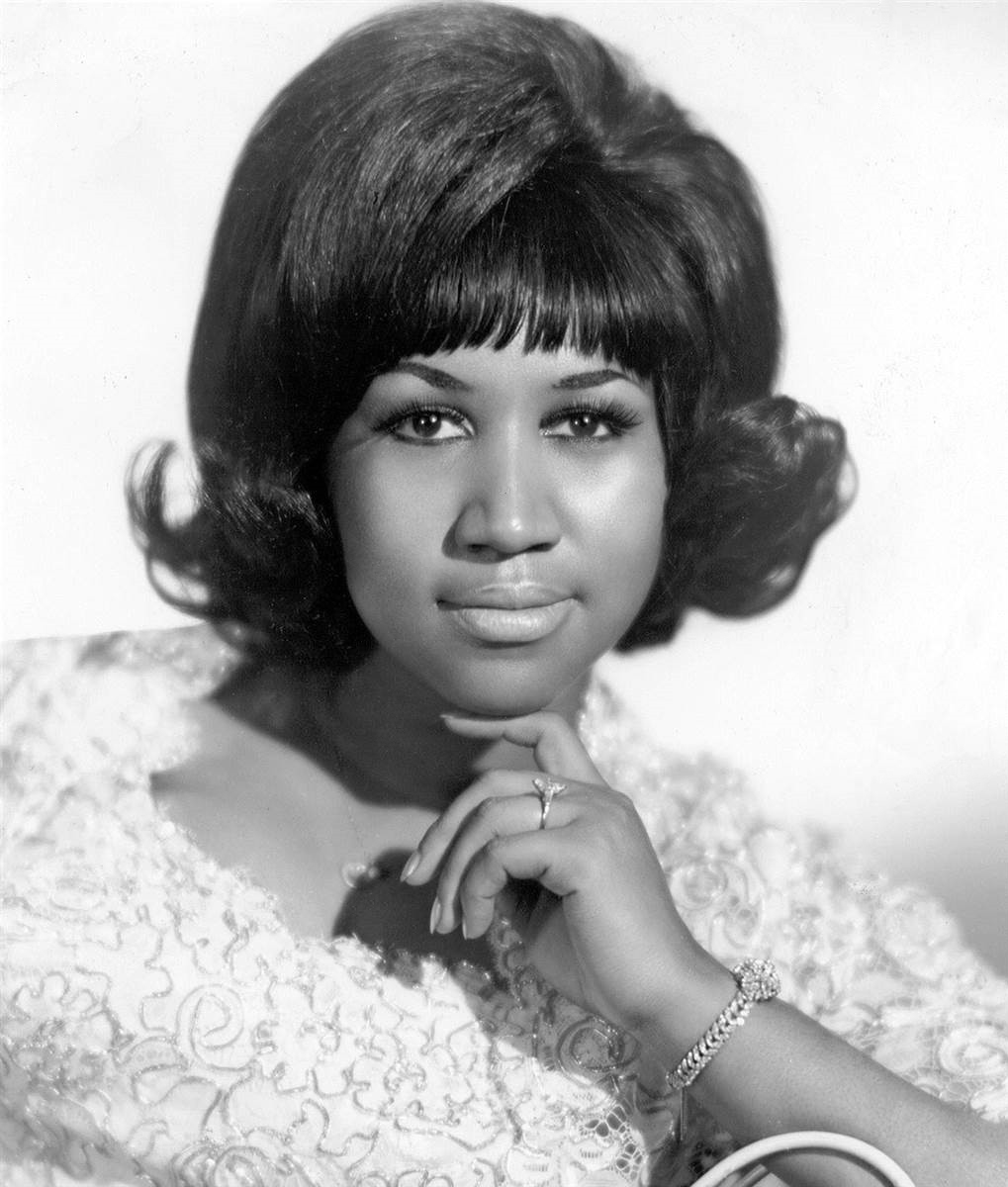
Aretha Franklin

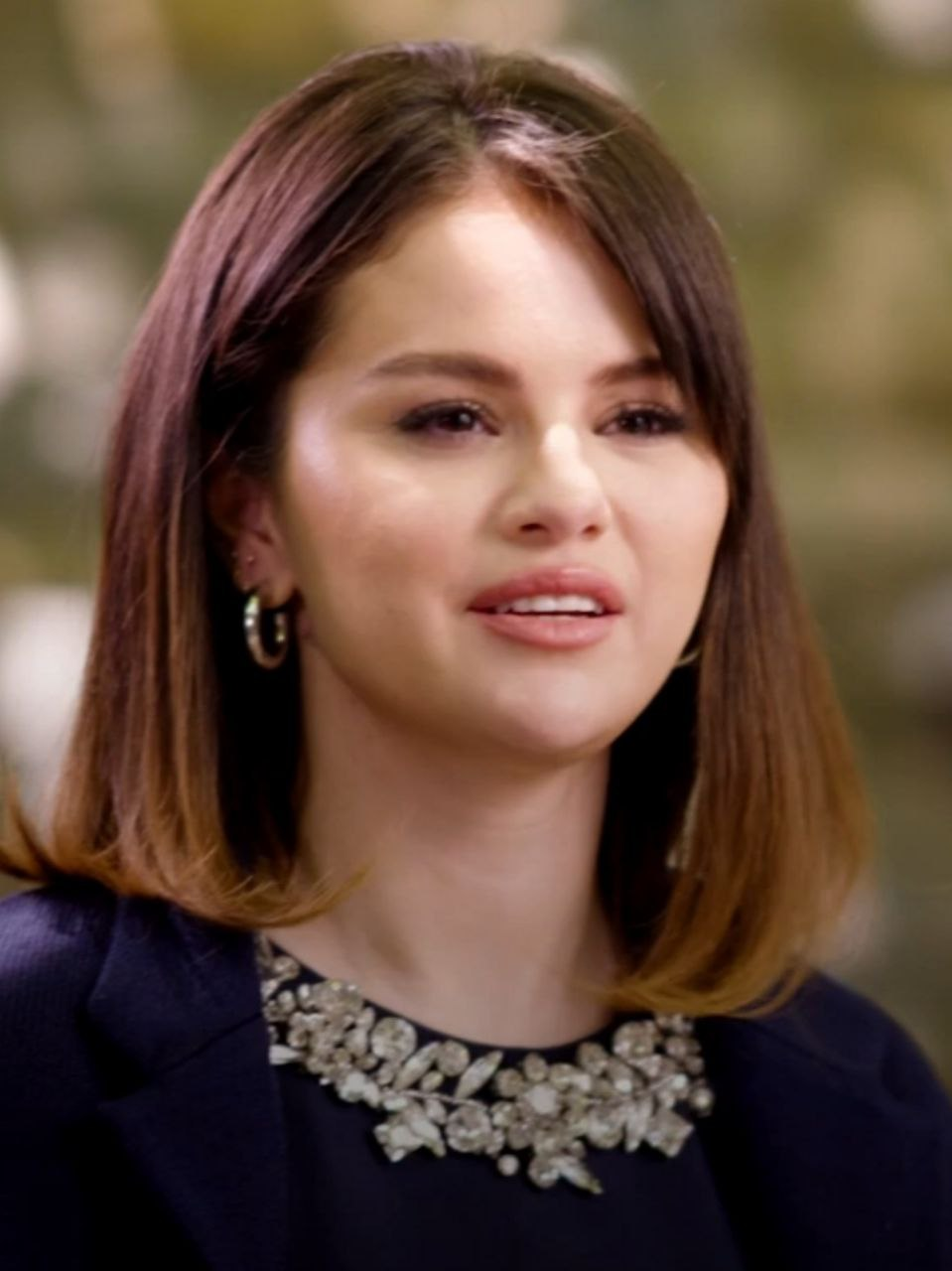
Selena Gomez

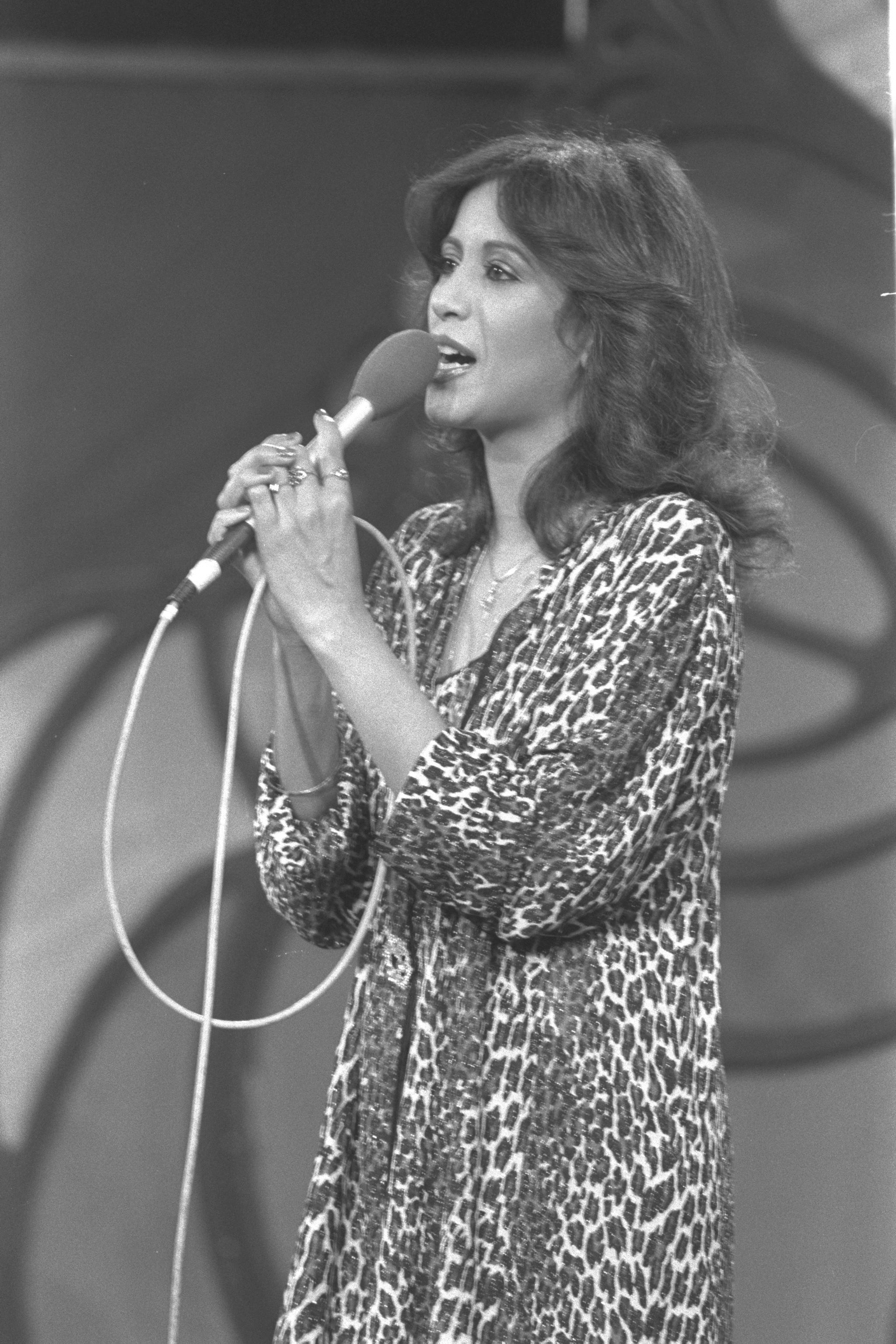
Ofra Haza

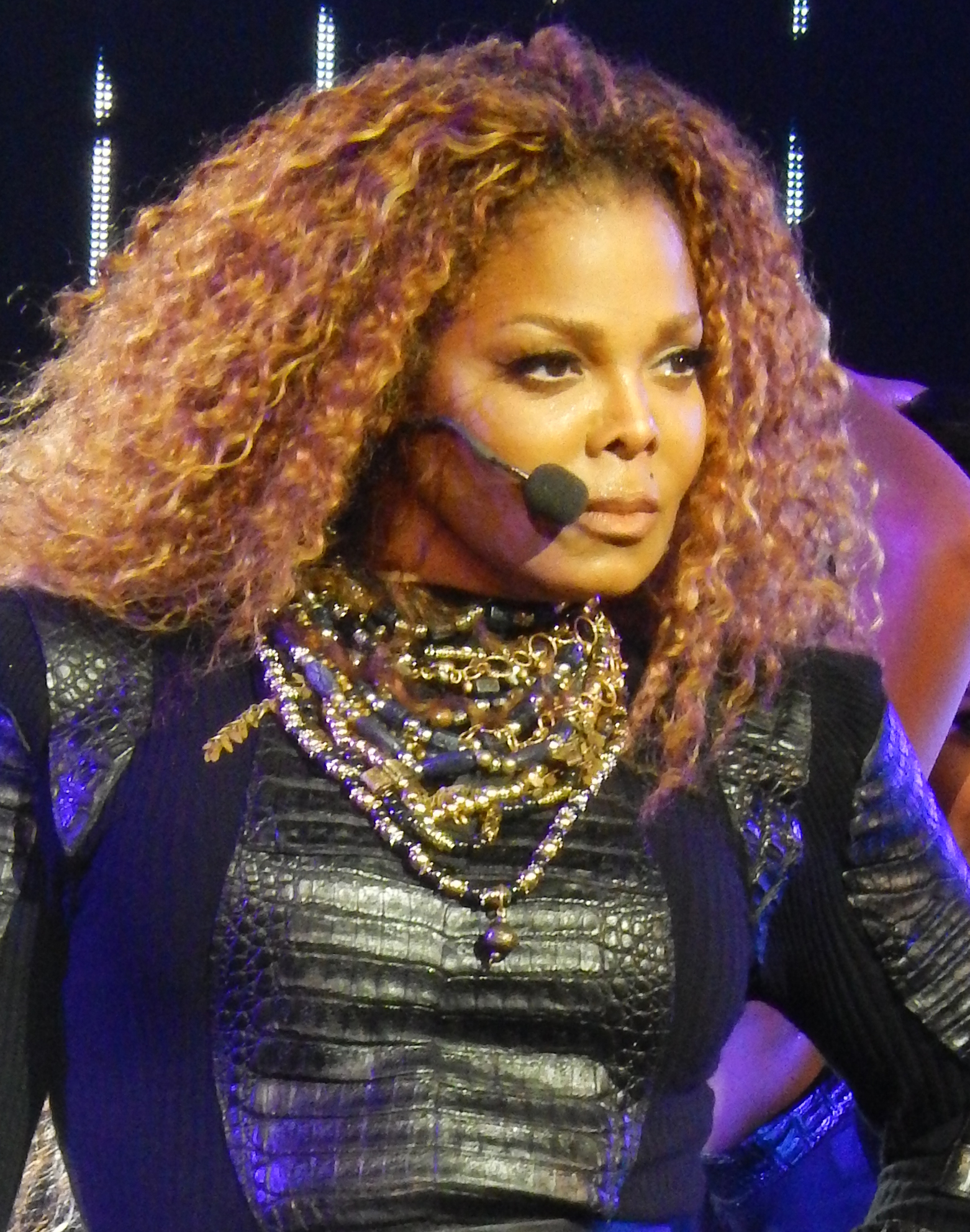
Janet Jackson

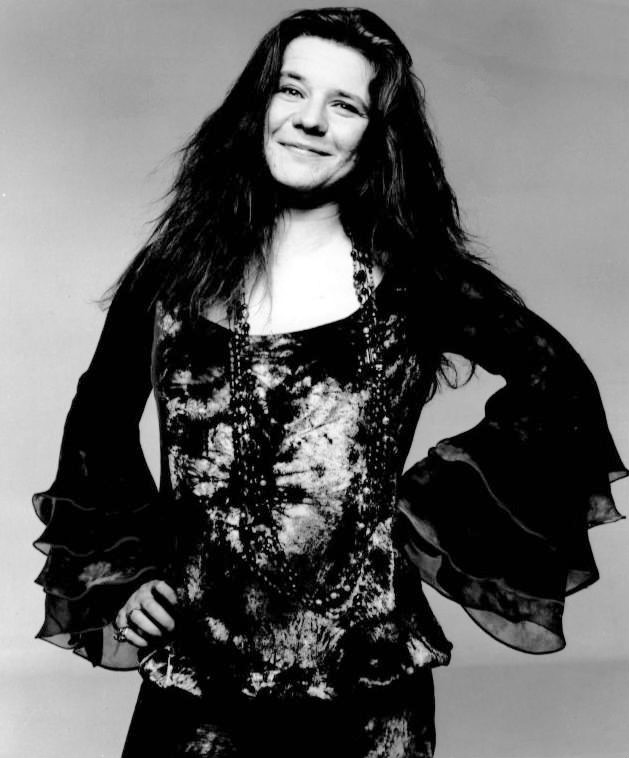
Janis Joplin

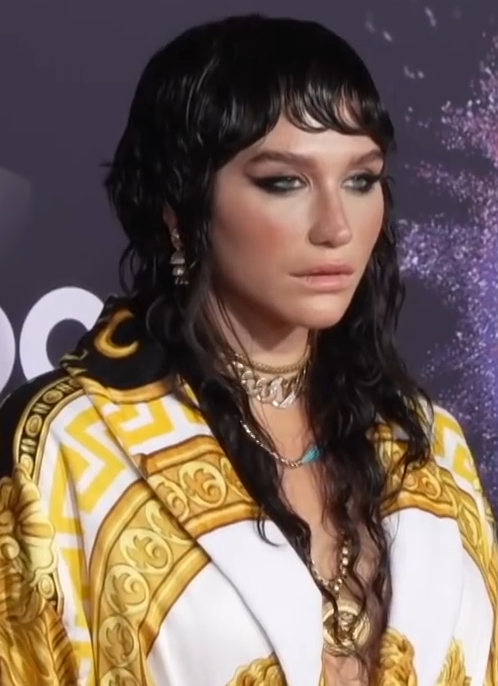
Kesha

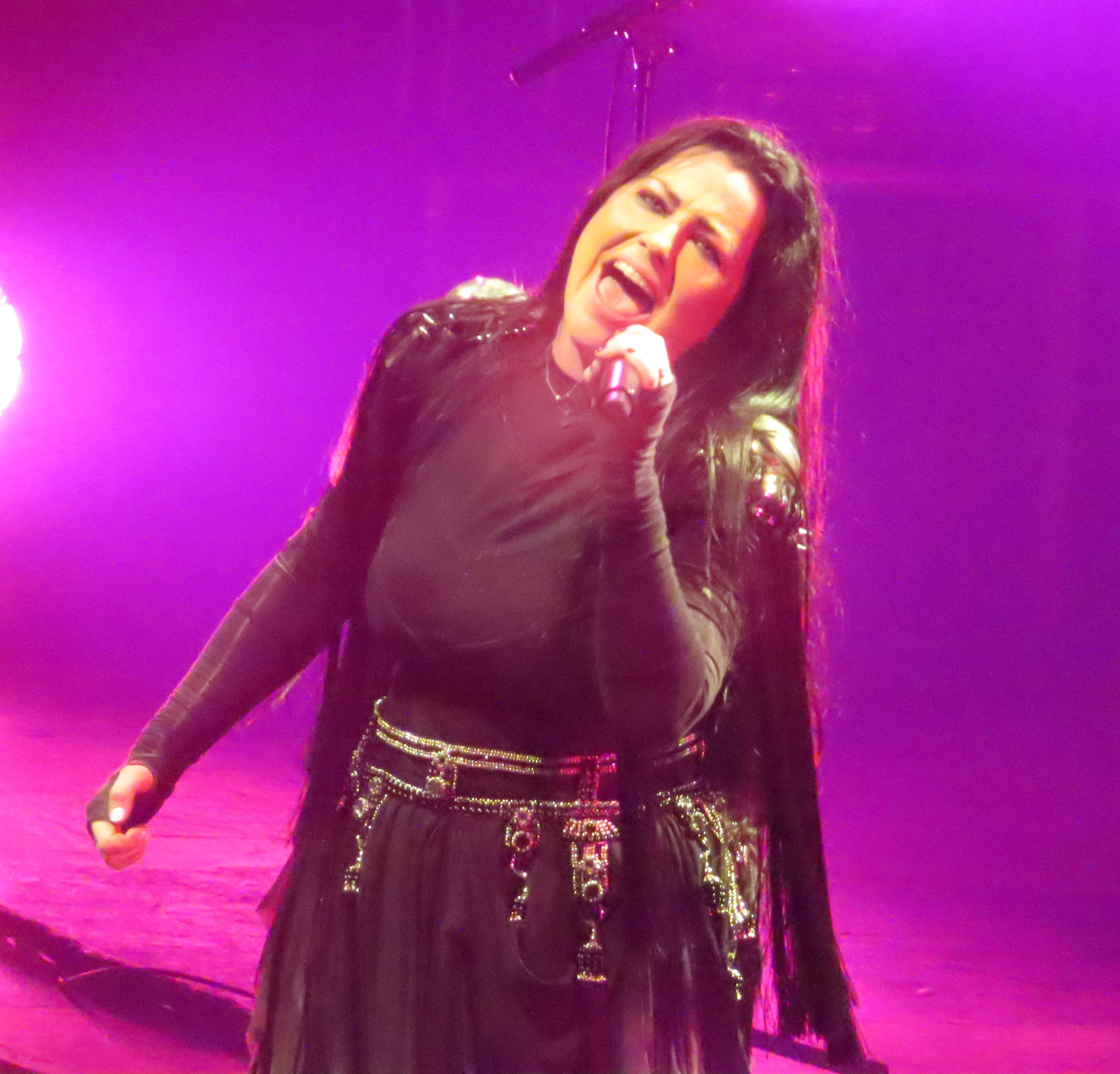
Amy Lee

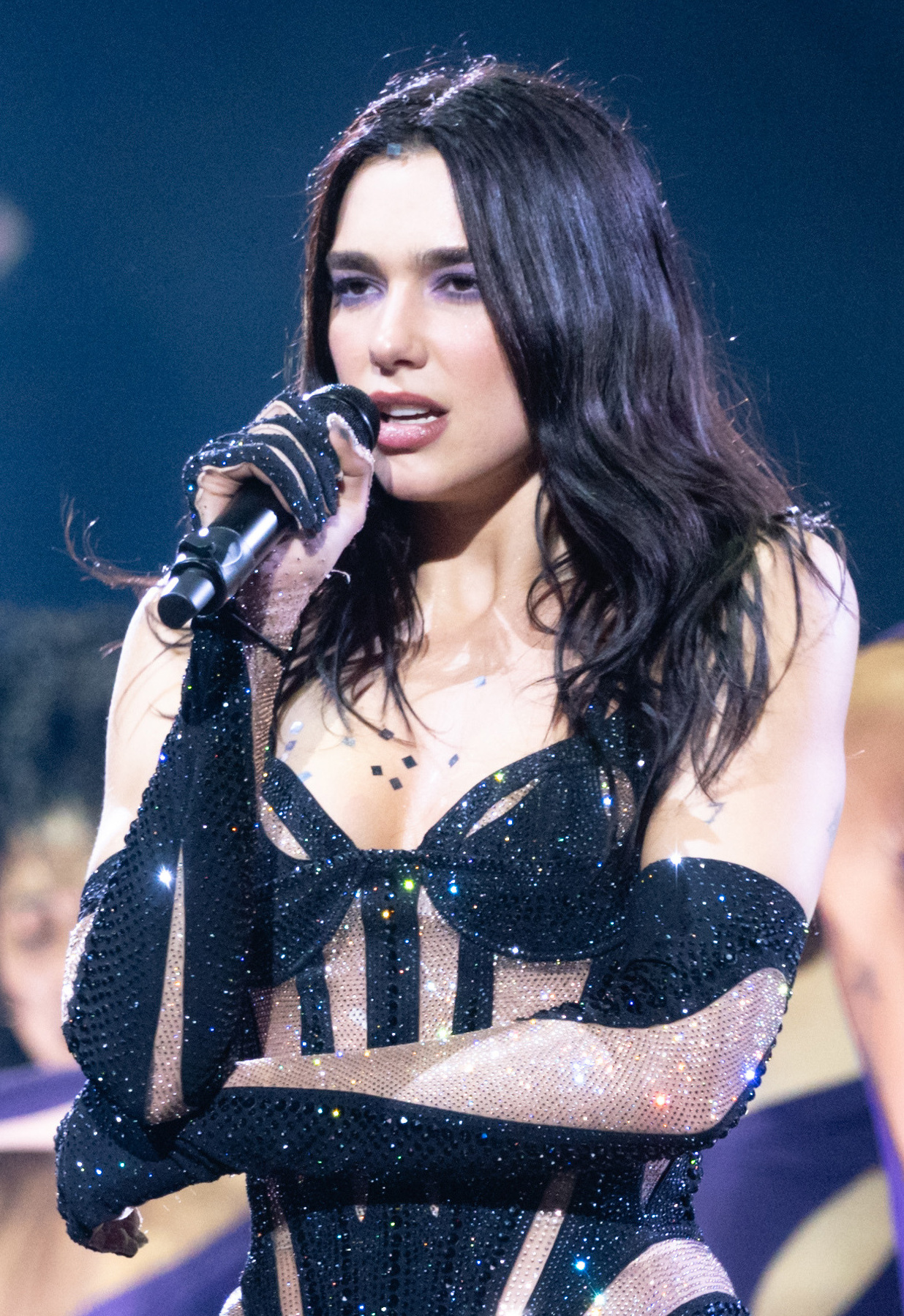
Dua Lipa

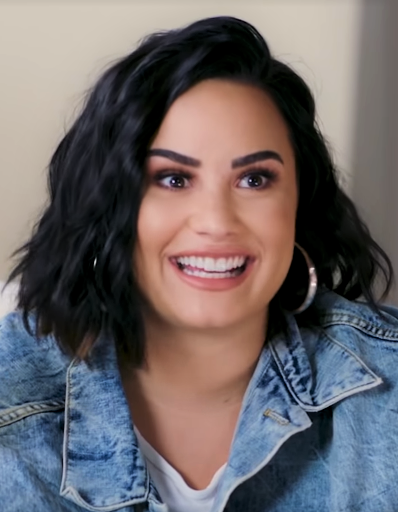
Demi Lovato

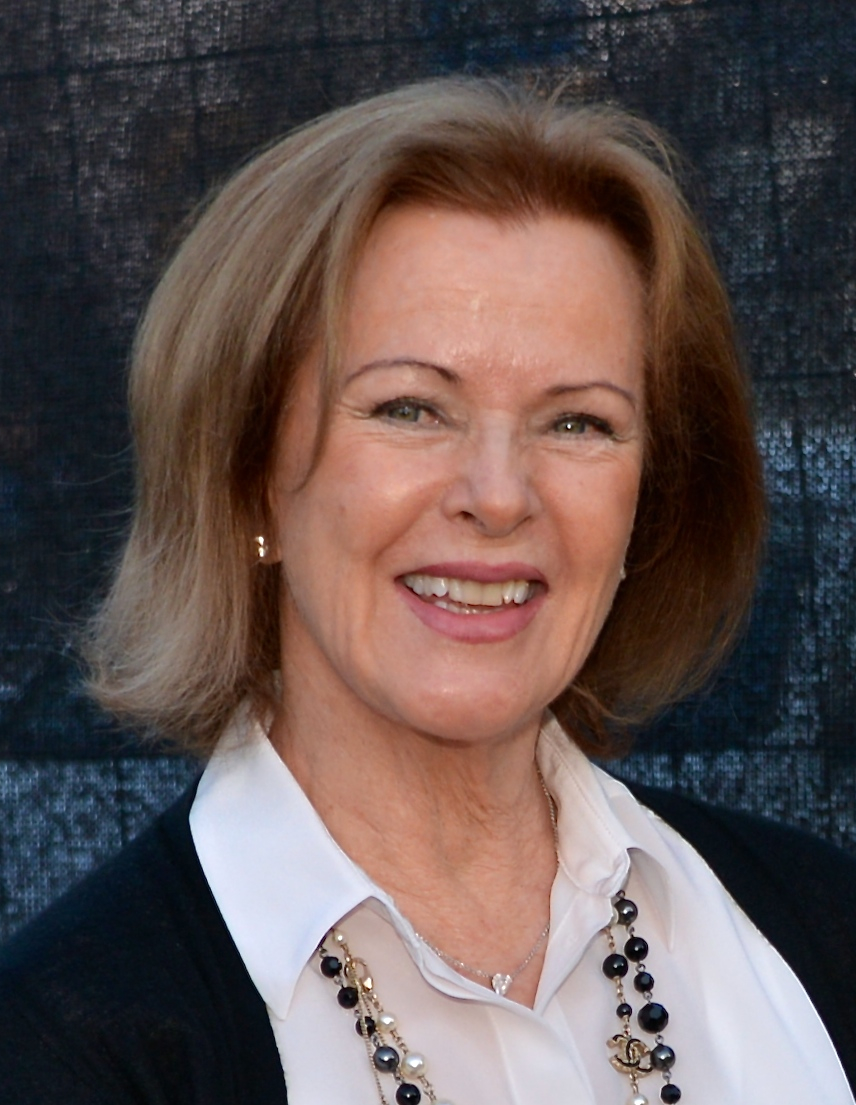
Anni-Frid Lyngstad

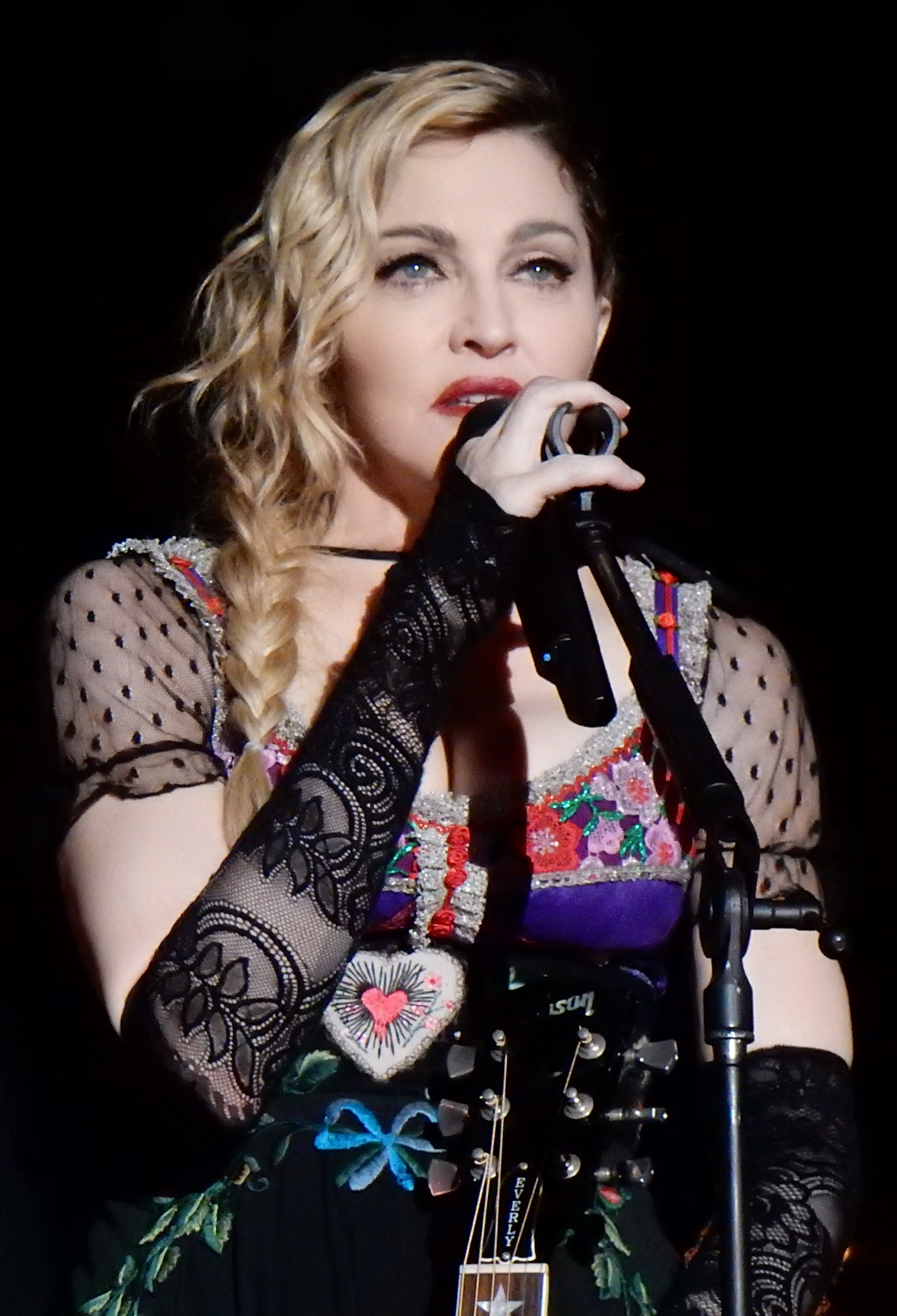
Madonna

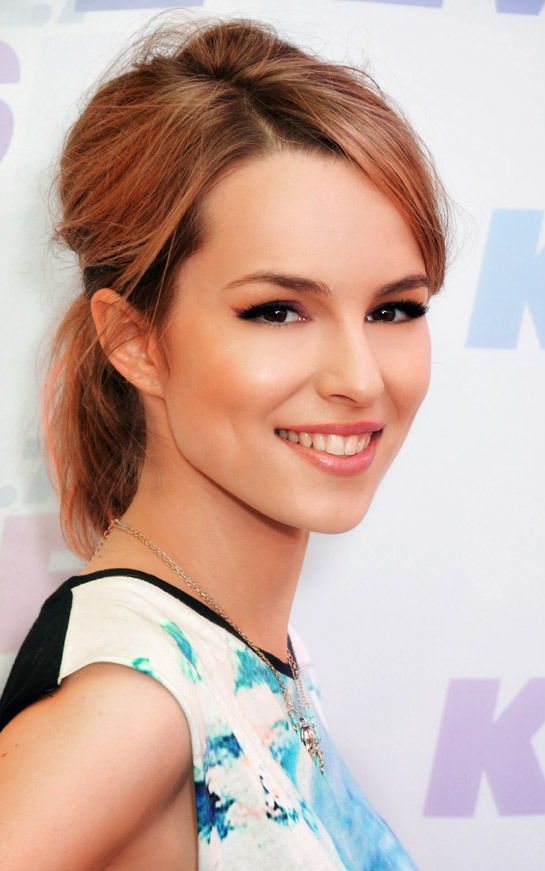
Bridgit Mendler

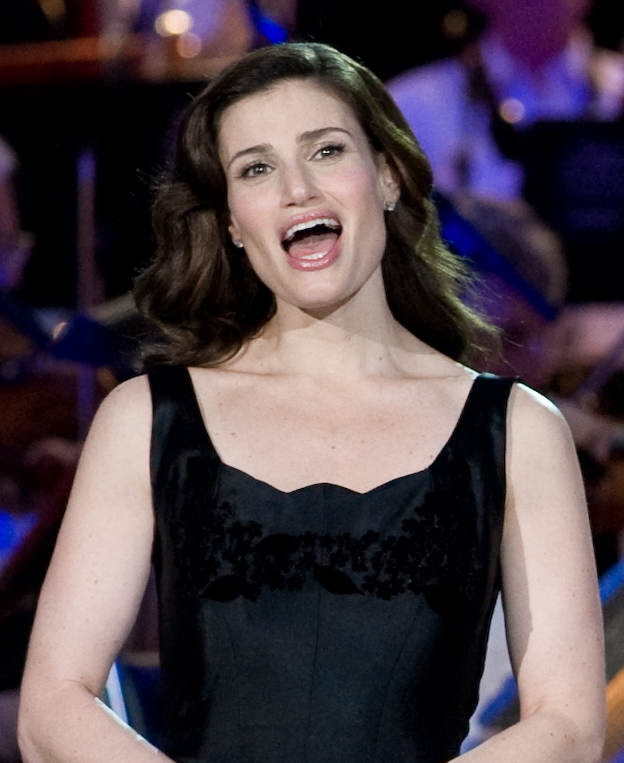
Idina Menzel

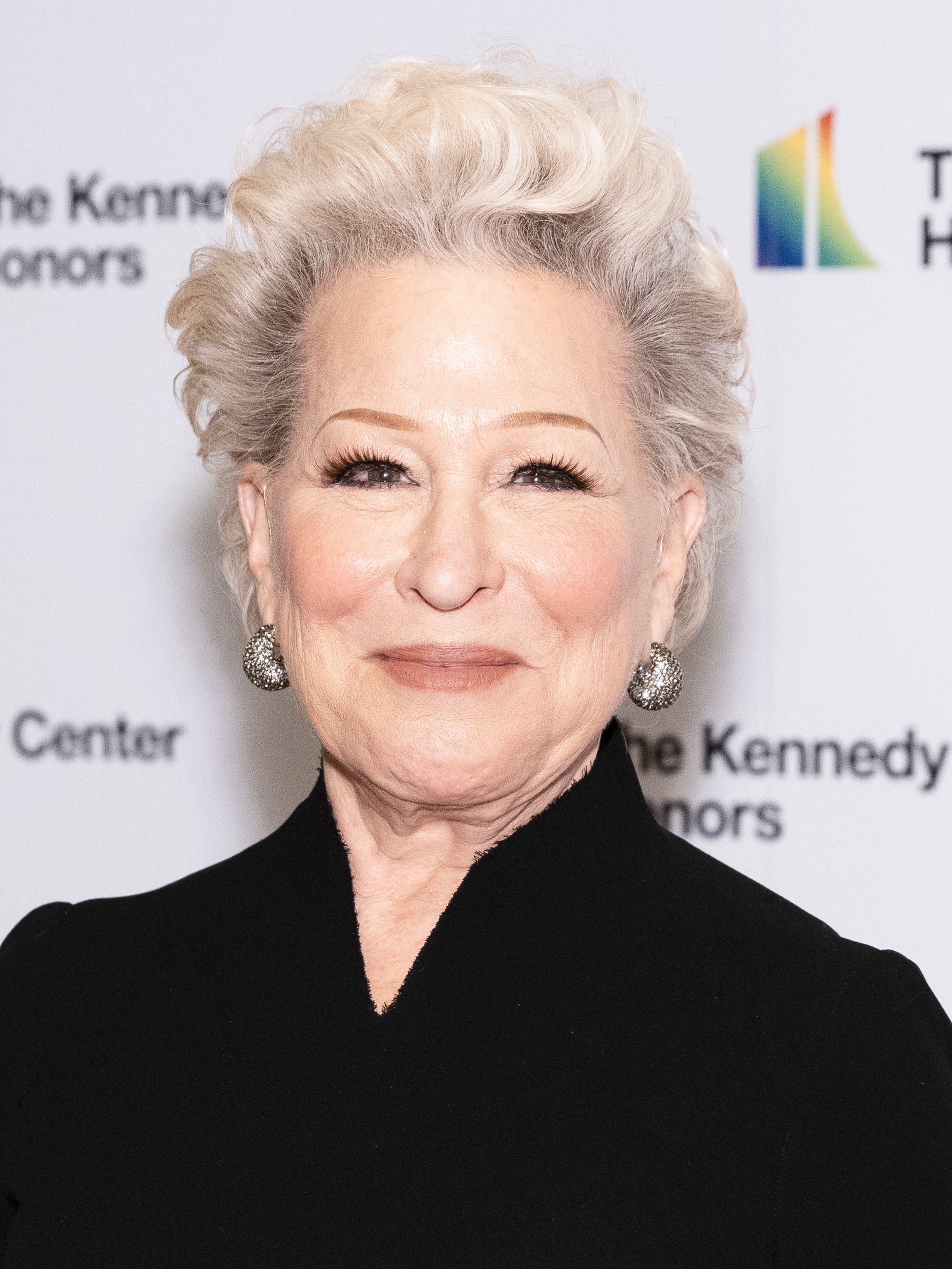
Bette Midler

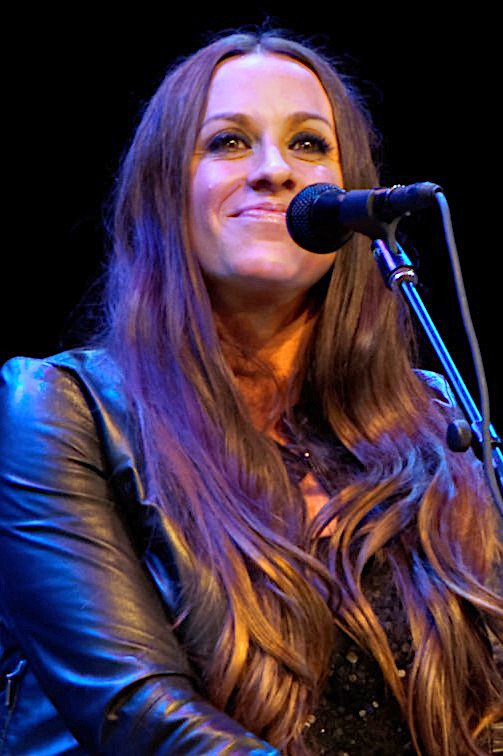
Alanis Morissette

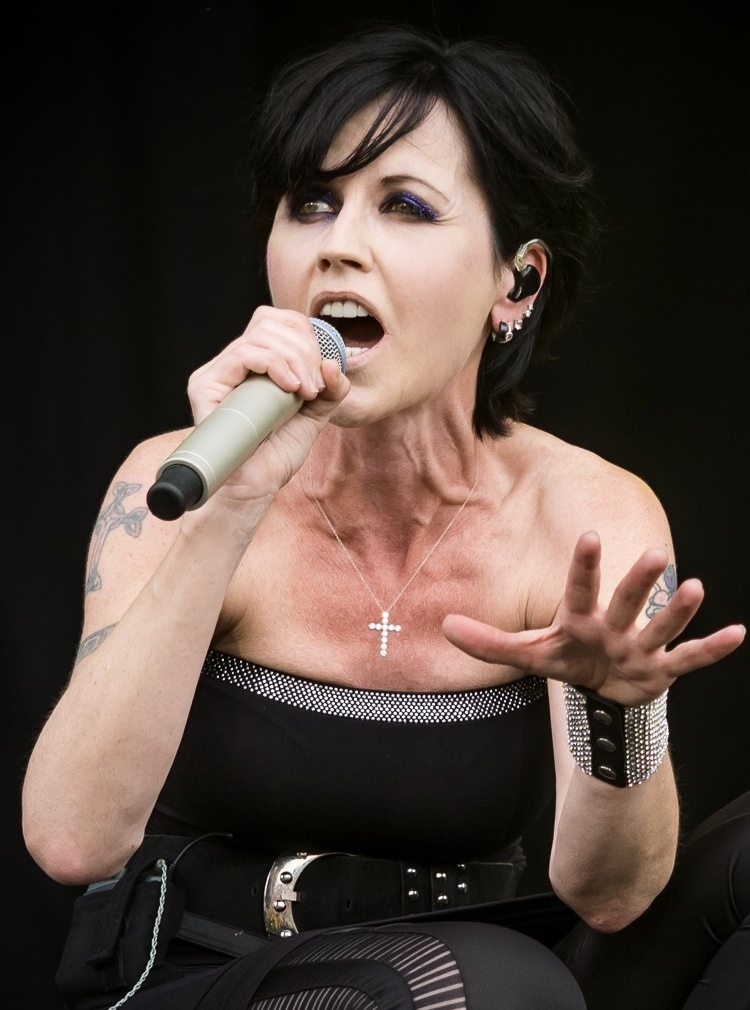
Dolores O'Riordan

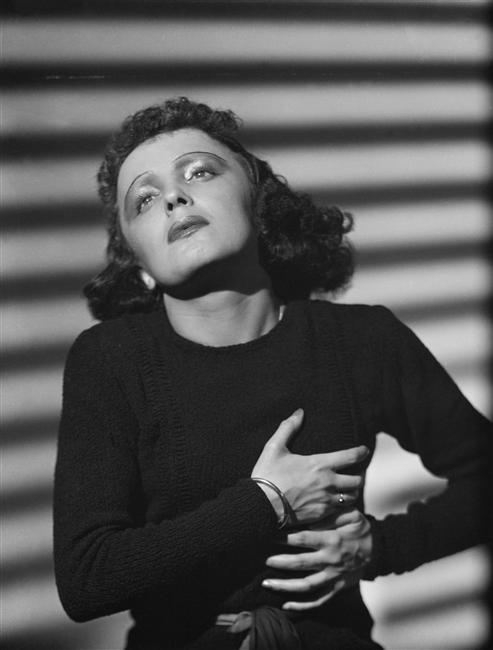
Édith Piaf

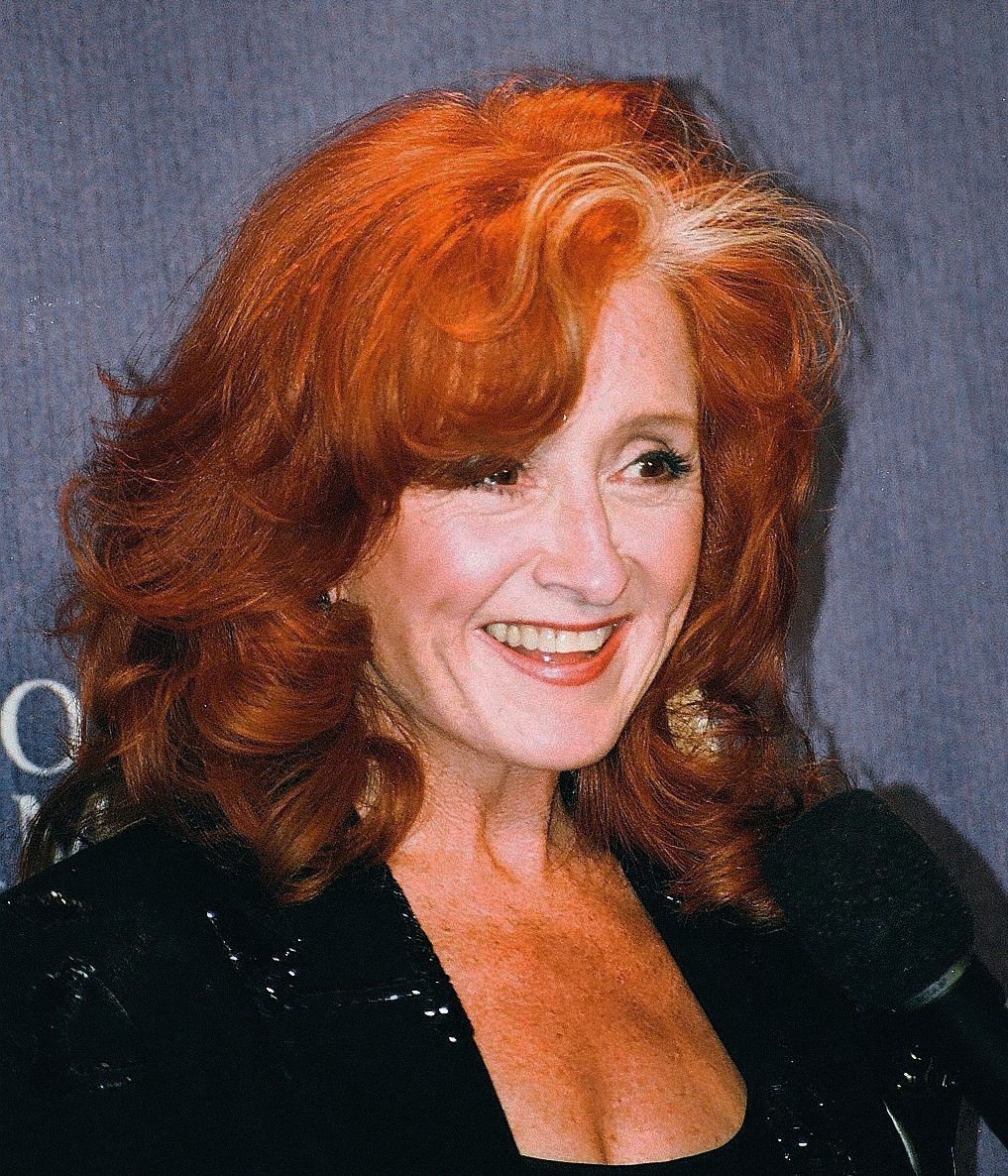
Bonnie Raitt

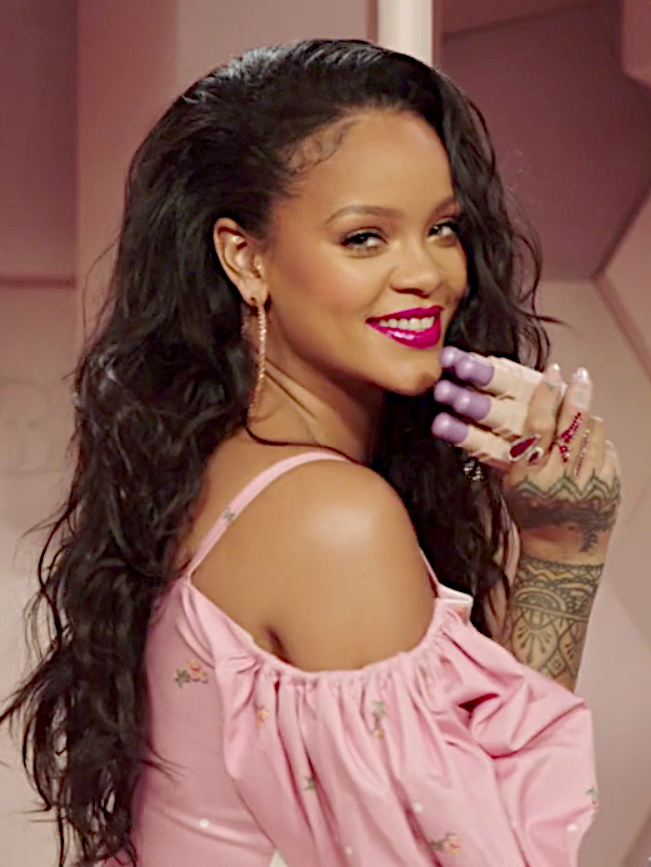
Rihanna

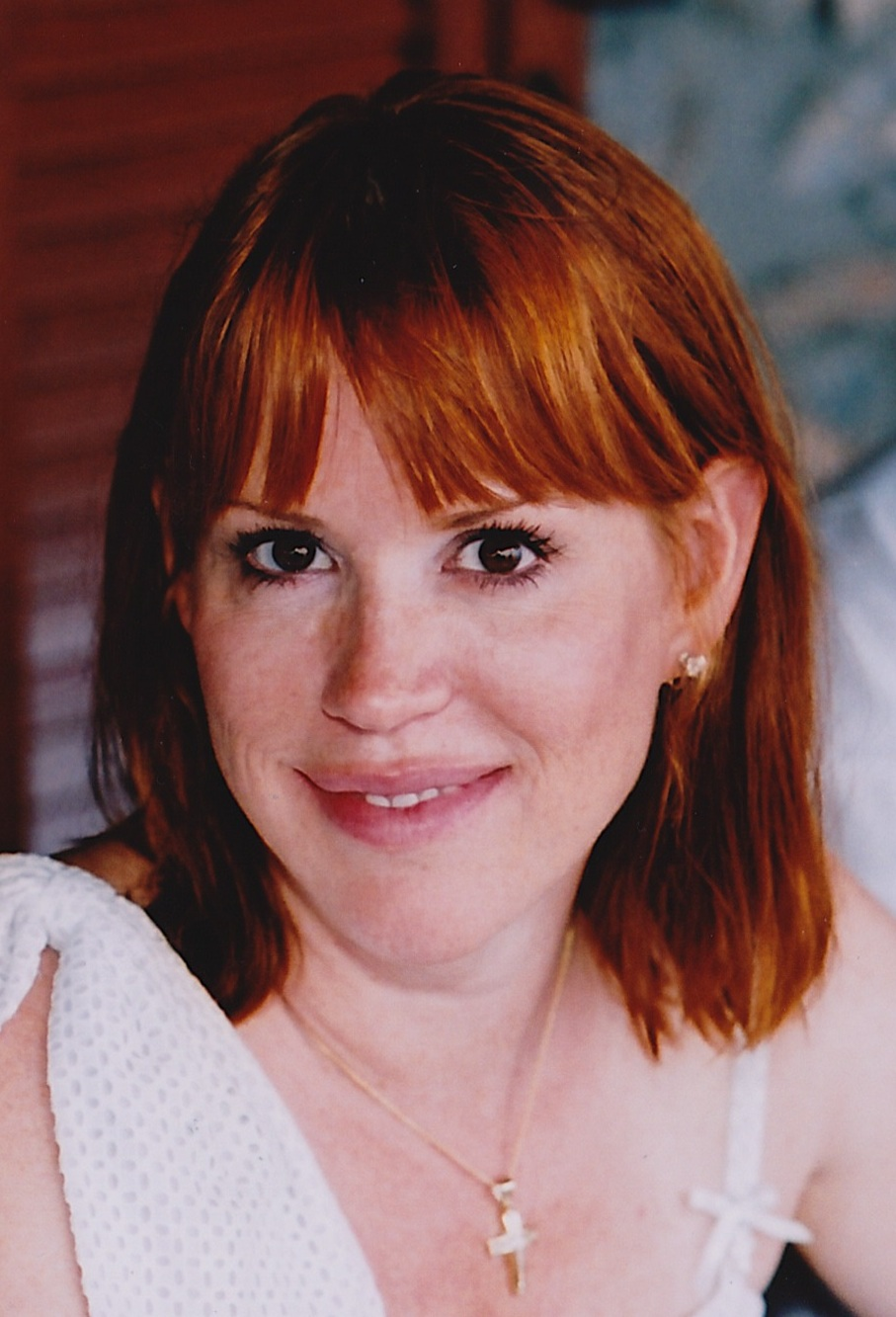
Molly Ringwald

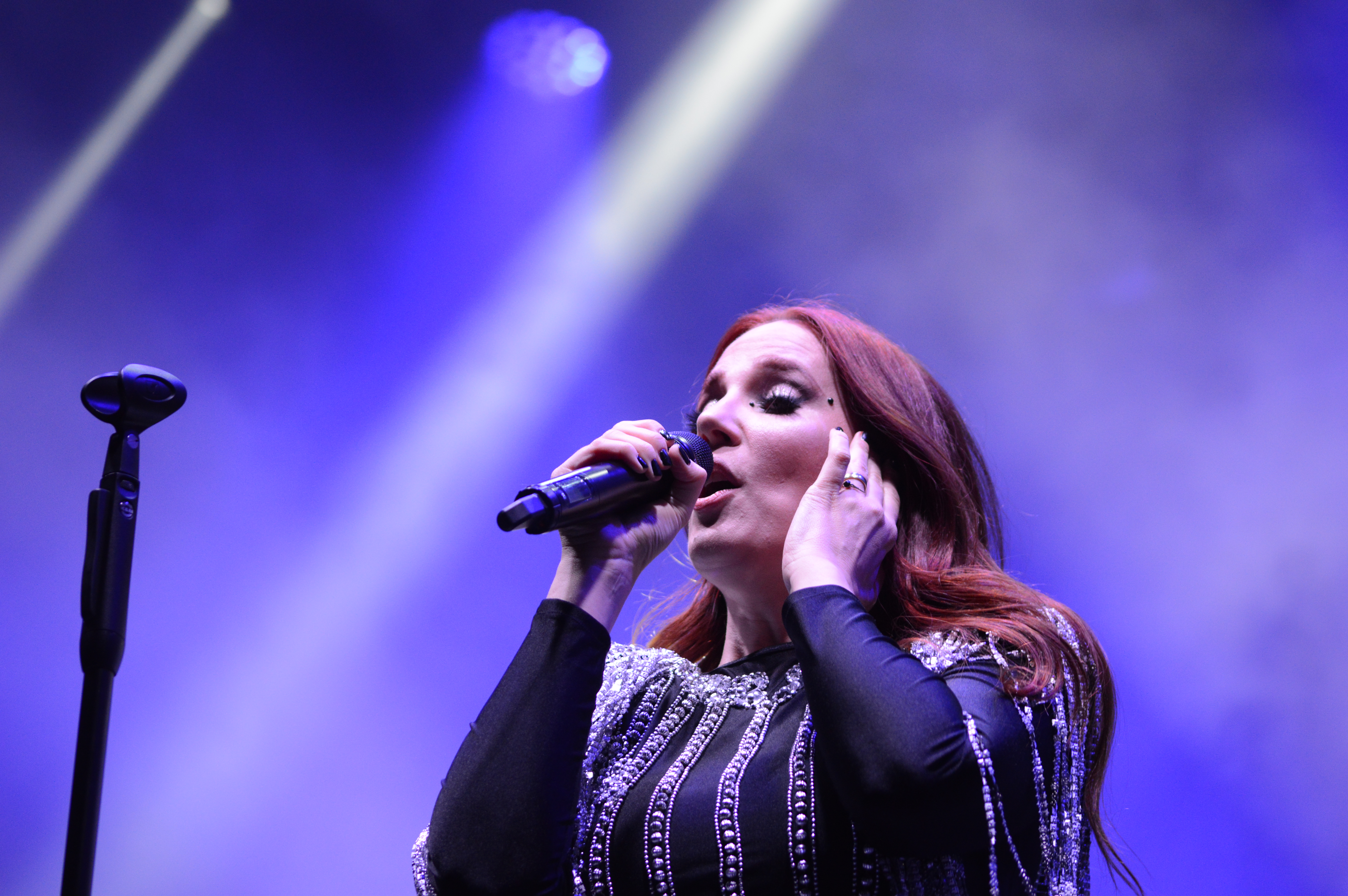
Simone Simons

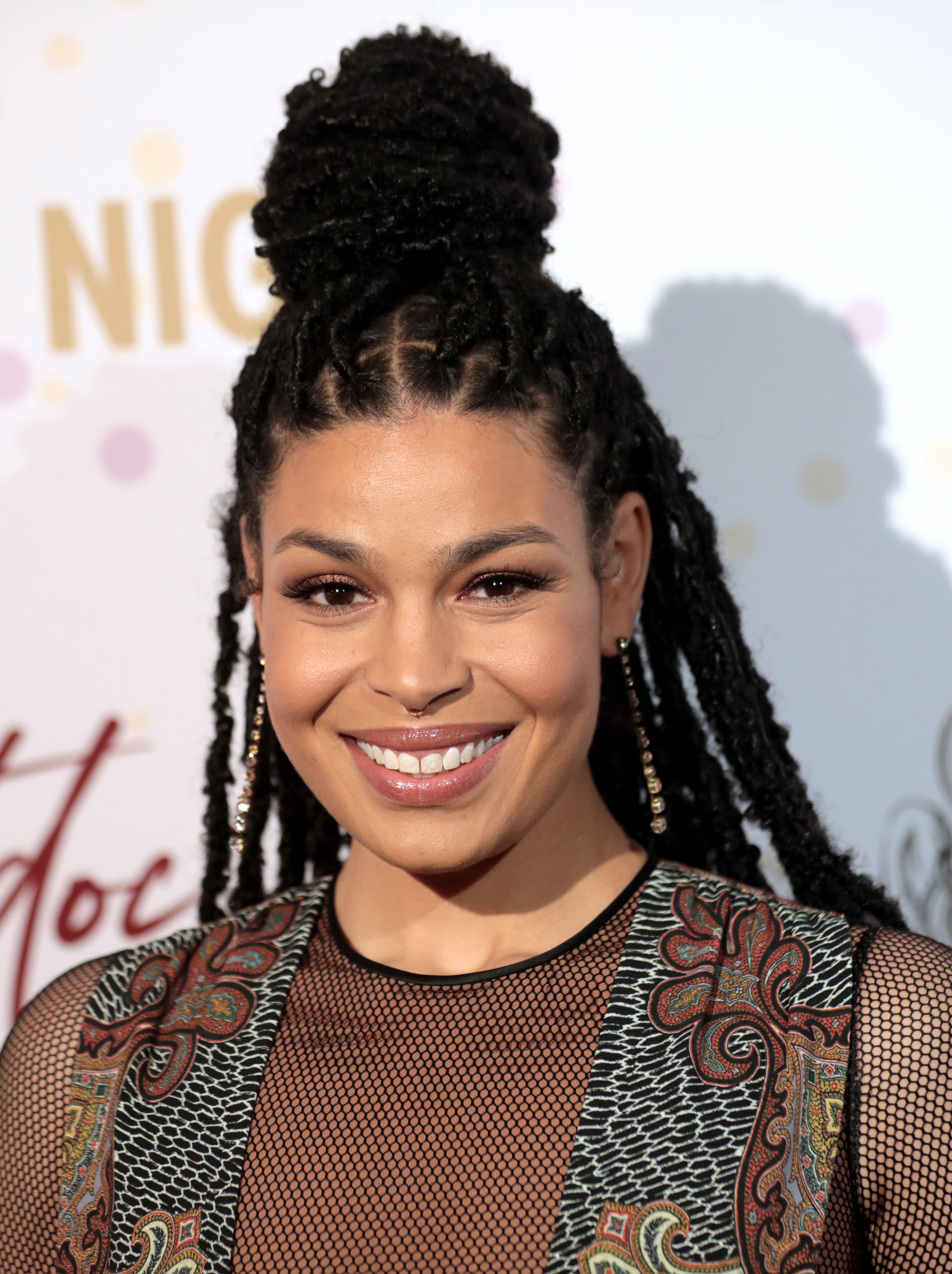
Jordin Sparks

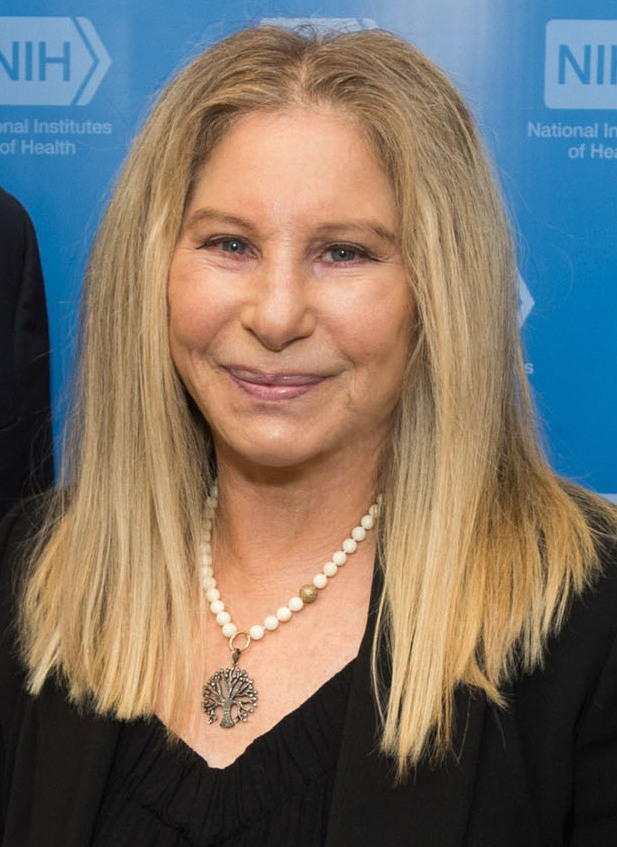
Barbra Streisand

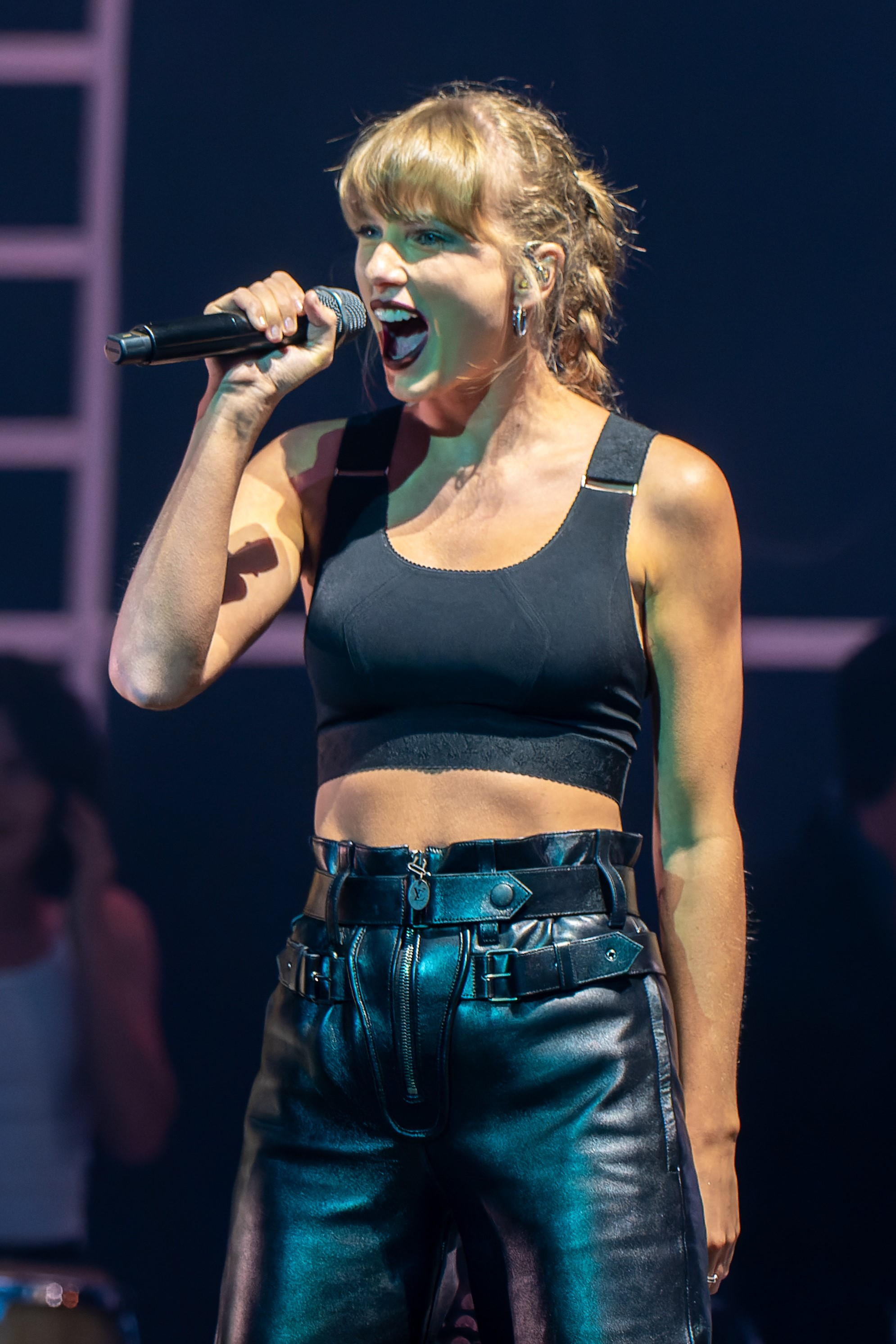
Taylor Swift

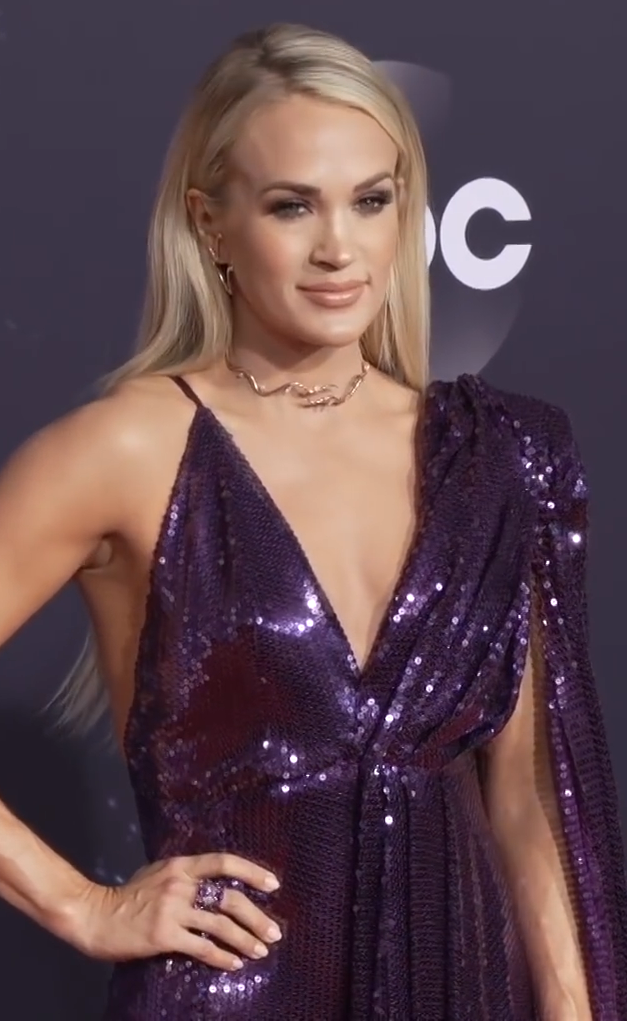
Carrie Underwood

Go to: A • B • C • D • E • F • G • H • I • J • K • L • M • N • O • P • Q • R • S • T • U • V • W • X • Y • Z

Name	Lifespan	Nationality	Associated act(s)	Ref.
Paula Abdul	1962–	American		
Yolanda Adams	1961–	American		
Adele (Note: Some sources also refer to Adele as a contralto)	1988–	English		
Mao Amin	1962–	Chinese		
Tori Amos	1963–	American	Y Kant Tori Read	
Amaia	1999–	Spanish		
Eva Amaral	1972–	Spanish	Amaral	
Anastacia	1968–	American		
Patty Andrews	1918–2013	American	The Andrews Sisters	
Ashnikko	1996–	American		
Chloe Bailey	1998–	American	Chloe x Halle	
Sara Bareilles	1979–	American		
Samantha Barks	1990–	English		
Fantasia Barrino	1984–	American		
Jean Baylor		American	The Baylor Project; Zhané	
Natasha Bedingfield (Note: Bedingfield is also referred to as a contralto)	1981-	English		
Samantha Bee	1969–	Canadian-American		
Begonia	1987/1988–	Canadian		
Ana Belén	1951–	Spanish		
Regina Belle	1963	American		
Pat Benatar	1953–	American		
Jenny Berggren	1972–	Swedish	Ace of Base	
Beyoncé	1981–	American	Destiny's Child	
Jade Bird	1997–	English		
Mary J. Blige	1971–	American		
Stephanie J. Block	1972–	American		
Nicole Bogner	1984–2012	Austrian	Visions of Atlantis	
Gretha Boston	1959–	American		
Susan Boyle	1961–	Scottish		
Edie Brickell	1966–	American	Edie Brickell & New Bohemians	
Betty Buckley (Note: Buckley is also referred to as a soprano)	1947–	American		
Mutya Buena	1985–	English	Sugababes; Mutya Keisha Siobhan	
Kim Burrell	1972–	American	GMWA Youth Mass Choir	
Shirley Caesar	1938–	American		
Ann Hampton Callaway	1958–	American		
Tina Campbell	1974–	American	Mary Mary	
Carolee Carmello	1962–	American		
Pearl Carr	1921–2020	English	Pearl Carr and Teddy Johnson	
Daniela Castro	1969–	Mexican		
Patti Cathcart	1949–	American	Tuck & Patti	
Cheryl	1983–	English	Girls Aloud	
Chilli	1971–	American	TLC	
Melanie Chisholm	1974–	English	Spice Girls	
Clairo	1998-	American		
Annie "St. Vincent" Clark	1982–	American		
Dorinda Clark-Cole	1957–	American	The Clark Sisters	
Tasha Cobbs Leonard	1981–	American		
Natalie Cole	1950–2015	American		
Gal Costa	1945–2022	Brazilian		
Consuelo Costin	1979–	American		
Sheryl Crow	1962–	American		
Julee Cruise	1956–2022	American		
Miley Cyrus (Note: Cyrus is also referred to as a contralto)	1992–	American		
Mary Bridget Davies	1978–	American		
Frenchie Davis	1979–	American		
Taylor Dayne	1962–	American		
Yvonne De Carlo	1922–2007	Canadian-American		
Ester Dean	1986–	American		
Clémentine Delauney	1987–	French	Visions of Atlantis; Exit Eden; Serenity	
Sharon den Adel	1974–	Dutch	Within Temptation; My Indigo	
Sandy Denny	1947–1978	English	Fairport Convention	
Zooey Deschanel	1980–	American	She & Him	
Marina Diamandis	1985–	Welsh		
Dido	1971–	English		
DJ Colette	1975–	American		
Rose Elinor Dougall	1986–	English	The Pipettes	
Rocío Dúrcal	1944–2006	Spanish		
Linda Eder	1961–	American		
Susan Egan	1970–	American		
Emma-Lee		Canadian		
Karen England	1974–	English	Opera Babes	
Enya	1961–	Irish	Clannad	
Paloma Faith	1981–	English		
Ella Fitzgerald (Note: Fitzgerald is also referred to as a contralto)	1917–1996	American		
Lita Ford	1958–	English-American	The Runaways	
Sutton Foster	1975–	American		
Connie Francis	1937–	American		
Aretha Franklin (Note: Some sources also refer to Franklin as a soprano)	1942-2018	American		
Kam Franklin	1987–	American	The Suffers	
Nelly Furtado	1978–	Canadian		
Maricris Garcia	1987–	Filipino	La Diva	
Katie Gavin	1992–	American	MUNA	
Inara George	1974–	American	The Bird and the Bee; The Living Sisters	
Jody Gnant	1981–	American		
Selena Gomez (Note: Gomez is also referred to as a soprano)	1992–	American	Selena Gomez & the Scene	
Angela Gossow	1974–	German	Arch Enemy; Mistress; Asmodina	
Amy Grant	1960–	American		
Laurel Halo	1985–	American		
Hani	1992–	South Korean	EXID	
Anne Hathaway	1982–	American		
Ofra Haza	1957 or 1958–2000	Israeli		
H.E.R. (Note: H.E.R. is also referred to as a contralto)	1997–	American		
Myriam Hernandez	1965–	Chilean		
Nicole Henry	1981/1982–	American		
Alison Hinds	1970–	Barbadian	Square One	
Gladys Horton	1945–2011	American	The Marvelettes	
Huh Yunjin	2001–	South Korean-American	Le Sserafim	
Jennifer Hudson (Note: Some sources also refer to Hudson as a contralto and a soprano)	1981–	American		
Geraldine Hunt	1945–2022	American		
Sophie Isaacs	1988–	English		
Janet Jackson	1966–	American		
Selina Jen	1981–	Taiwanese	S.H.E	
Katherine Jenkins (Note: Some sources also refer to Jenkins as a soprano)	1980–	Welsh		
Jennie	1996–	South Korean	Blackpink	
Jessie J	1988–	English		
Jeonghwa	1995–	South Korean	EXID	
Joan Jett	1958–	American	The Runaways; Joan Jett & the Blackhearts	
Jisoo	1995–	South Korean	Blackpink	
Lisa Johansson	1981–	Swedish	Draconian	
Martha Johnson	1950–	Canadian	Martha and the Muffins	
JoJo	1990–	American		
Janis Joplin	1943–1970	American	Big Brother and the Holding Company	
Rocío Jurado	1944–2006	Spanish		
Kelis	1979–	American		
Kathy Kelly	1961–	American	The Kelly Family	
Stacey Kent	1965–	American		
Kesha	1987–	American		
Alexia Khadime	1983–	English		
Koffee	2000–	Jamaican		
Chantal Kreviazuk	1974–	Canadian		
k.d. lang	1961–	Canadian		
Gaelynn Lea	1984–	American	The Murder of Crows	
Ledisi	1972–	American		
Amy Lee	1981–	American	Evanescence	
Lee Hi	1996–	South Korean	Hi Suhyun	
Julie Lee (Note: Some sources also refer to Lee as a soprano)		American	Old Black Kettle	
Ute Lemper	1963–	German		
Nolwenn Leroy	1982–	French		
Leona Lewis	1985–	English		
Uyên Linh	1987–	Vietnamese		
Dua Lipa (Note: Some sources also refer to Lipa as a contralto)	1995–	English		
Cher Lloyd	1993–	English		
Julie London (Note: London is also referred to as a contralto)	1926–2000	American		
Lorde (Note: Some sources also refer to Lorde as a contralto)	1996–	New Zealand		
Demi Lovato (Note: Some sources also refer to Lovato as a soprano)	1992–	American		
Darlene Love	1941–	American	The Blossoms	
Patti LuPone	1949–	American		
Anni-Frid Lyngstad	1945–	Norwegian-Swedish	ABBA	
Vera Lynn	1917–2020	English		
Leanne Lyons	1973–	American	SWV	
Kirsty MacColl	1959–2000	British		
Madonna	1958–	American	Breakfast Club	
Ella Mai	1994–	English		
Kirstin Maldonado	1992–	American	Pentatonix	
Malú	1982–	Spanish		
Mandisa	1976–2024	American		
Tamela Mann	1966–	American	Kirk Franklin & The Family	
Claire Martin	1967–	English		
Mary Martin	1913–1990	American		
Melanie Martinez	1995–	American		
Tirzah Mastin		English		
Kathy Mattea	1959–	American		
Amanda McBroom	1947–	American		
Sarah McLachlan	1968–	Canadian		
Elle McLemore	1991–	American		
Nicky Mehta		Canadian	The Wailin' Jennys	
Katie Melua	1984–	British		
Bridgit Mendler	1992–	American		
Alex Menne		American	Great Grandpa	
Idina Menzel	1971–	American		
Jennylyn Mercado	1987–	Filipino		
Ethel Merman	1908–1984	American		
Bette Midler	1945–	American		
Amy Millan	1973–	Canadian	Stars; Broken Social Scene	
Mina (Note: Mina is also referred to as a soprano)	1940–	Italian		
Liza Minnelli	1946–	American		
Holly Miranda	1982–	American	The Jealous Girlfriends	
Janelle Monáe	1985–	American		
Victoria Monét	1993–	American		
Jane Monheit	1977–	American		
Amaia Montero	1976–	Spanish	La Oreja de Van Gogh	
Patricia Morison	1915–2018	American		
Alanis Morissette	1974–	Canadian-American		
Joan Morris	1943–	American		
Hannah Mrozak	1999-	American	Citizen Queen	
Maria Muldaur	1943–	American		
Martha Munizzi	1968–	American		
Marissa Nadler	1981–	American		
Joanna Newsom	1982–	American	The Pleased	
Hồng Nhung (Note: Some sources also refer to Nhung as a soprano)	1970–	Vietnamese		
Normani	1996–	American	Fifth Harmony	
Sinéad O'Connor	1966–2023	Irish		
Omawumi	1982–	Nigerian		
Rita Ora	1990–	English		
Dolores O'Riordan	1971–2018	Irish	The Cranberries	
Laura Pausini	1974–	Italian		
Christina Perri	1986–	American		
Thu Phương (Note: Phương is also referred to as a "mezzo alto")	1972–	Vietnamese		
Édith Piaf	1915–1963	French		
Nandi Rose Plunkett	1988/1989–	American	Half Waif	
Cassadee Pope	1989–	American	Hey Monday	
Jessica Pratt	1987–	American		
Kelly Price	1973–	American		
Alla Pugacheva	1949–	Russian		
Robin Quivers	1952–	American		
Lệ Quyên	1981–	Vietnamese		
Như Quỳnh	1970–	Vietnamese-American		
Bonnie Raitt	1949–	American		
Raiven	1996–	Slovenian		
Jean Redpath	1937–2014	Scottish		
Shelley Regner	1988–	American	DCappella	
Daisy Ridley	1992–	English		
Rihanna (Note: Some sources also refer to Rihanna as a contralto)	1988–	Barbadian		
Amber Riley	1986–	American	Leading Ladies	
Molly Ringwald	1968–	American		
Suzzy Roche (Note: Some sources also refer to Roche as a contralto)	1956–	American	The Roches	
Maggie Rogers	1994-	American		
Kelly Rowland	1981–	American	Destiny's Child	
Jennifer Rush	1960–	American		
Cathie Ryan		Irish-American	Cherish the Ladies	
Mônica Salmaso	1971–	Brazilian		
Lea Salonga	1971–	Filipino		
Paloma San Basilio	1950–	Spanish		
Marta Sánchez	1966–	Spanish	Olé Olé	
Santigold	1976–	American	Stiffed	
Tiwa Savage	1980–	Nigerian		
Seyi Shay	1985–	British	From Above	
Kierra Sheard	1987–	American		
Sigrid	1996–	Norwegian		
Diana Silvers	1997–	American		
Ashlee Simpson	1984-	American		
Faryl Smith (Note: Some sources also refer to Smith as a soprano)	1995–	British		
Song Yuqi	1999-	Chinese	(G)I-dle	
Jordin Sparks	1989–	American		
Regina Spektor	1980–	Russian-American		
Sienna Spiro (Note: Some sources also refer to Spiro as a contralto)	2005–	English		
Dusty Springfield	1939–1999	English	The Springfields; The Lana Sisters	
Jo Stafford	1917–2008	American		
Jevetta Steele	1963–	American		
Gwen Stefani	1969–	American	No Doubt	
Stephanie	1987–	South Korean	The Grace	
Katie Stevens	1992–	American		
Barbra Streisand	1942–	American		
Jazmine Sullivan	1987–	American		
Donna Summer (Note: Some sources also refer to Summer as an alto)	1948–2012	American		
Taylor Swift	1989–	American		
Mariya Takeuchi	1955–	Japanese		
Mỹ Tâm	1981–	Vietnamese		
Tamia	1975–	Canadian		
Rhian Teasdale	1993–	English	Wet Leg	
Thalía	1971–	Mexican	Timbiriche	
Linda Thompson	1947–	English		
Hương Tràm (Note: Tràm is also referred to as a soprano)	1995–	Vietnamese		
Underscores	2000–	American		
Carrie Underwood	1983–	American		
Elle Varner	1989–	American		
Martha Wainwright	1976–	Canadian-American		
Waje		Nigerian		
Jessie Ware (Note: Some sources also refer to Ware as a soprano)	1984–	English		
Allison Williams	1988–	American		
Nancy Wilson	1954–	American	Heart	
Elisabeth Withers	1970–	American		
Rachael Wooding	1979–	English		
Jamila Woods	1989–	American		
Tammy Wynette	1942–1998	American		
Nilüfer Yanya	1995–	British		
Trisha Yearwood	1964–	American		
Li Yuchun	1984–	Chinese		
Lyudmila Zykina	1929-2009	Soviet-Russian		

== See also ==
- List of contraltos in non-classical music
- List of sopranos in non-classical music
- List of tenors in non-classical music
- List of baritones in non-classical music
- List of basses in non-classical music
- Voice classification in non-classical music
