= The Magician's Private Library =

Studio album by Holly Miranda
- Released: February 23, 2010
- Recorded: 2008; Staygold Studio, Sterling Sound
- Genre: Indie rock, alternative
- Length: 42:28
- Label: XL Recordings
- Producer: Dave Sitek, Katrina Ford

Holly Miranda chronology
High Above the City: Evolution (2004)	The Magician's Private Library (2010)

Singles from The Magician's Private Library
- 1. "Forest Green, Oh Forest Green" Released: November 17, 2009; 2. "Waves" Released: April 26, 2010

The Magician's Private Library is the second studio album by American singer-songwriter Holly Miranda, released February 23, 2010, in the United States by XL Recordings. It was produced by TV on the Radio’s Dave Sitek and Celebration's Katrina Ford.

== Writing and development ==
While performing in New York City's anti-folk scene with The Jealous Girlfriends in support of their 2007 album The Jealous Girlfriends, Miranda decided to release a solo album with help from her producer friend TV on the Radio's Dave Sitek. The Magician's Private Library was recorded in 2008. Miranda's publisher Chrysalis Music financed the album, but it wasn't formally released until 2010 after Miranda was signed to XL Recordings. Miranda explained that the title came from her uncle's description of what he thought The Dark Side of the Moon sounded like.

"Sleep on Fire" was inspired by Miranda's friend who was asleep in his bed when the apartment downstairs caught on fire. After the friend was rescued and the fire was put out, they found that the only part of the friend's apartment that had burned was the floor beneath his bed.

== Composition ==
Musically, the album drew influences from Nina Simone and dream pop icons Cocteau Twins and Mazzy Star.

Lyrically, the songs on The Magician's Private Library address sleep and dreaming. Miranda explained in an interview with About.com that,

"A lot of times when I’m writing songs, I’m writing them to myself, trying to help me get through something, or work something out, understand something. Hopefully that sense is something I can share with people. A lot of these songs are about dreams, and the contrast between dreaming and reality; exploring the divide between the two, and becoming aware that living in dreams can be dangerous, and that the present moment is all we have."

== Critical reception ==
Professional ratings
Review scores
Source	Rating
Allmusic	3/5 stars
Contactmusic.com	3/5 stars
Drowned in Sound	6/10 stars
Gigwise.com	4.5/5 stars
The Guardian	3/5 stars
MusicOMH	4.5/5 stars
NME	8/10 stars
Pitchfork Media	(6.7/10)
PopMatters	4/10 stars
Venus Zine	4/5 stars

The Magician's Private Library received generally favorable reviews. The album holds a score of 68 out of 100 on the review aggregator website Metacritic. Andrew Leahey of Allmusic said, "The results are alternately ghostly, sexy, and nocturnal, but they’re always moving." Likewise, Mark Perlaki of Gigwise.com described the album as "lush, ethereal, and brassy-toned." By contrast, Drowned in Sound's David Renshaw said, "Holly Miranda makes nice music, sometimes really pretty, but it doesn’t say anything real or move emotions to anywhere even nearing an extreme."

Many reviews focussed on Dave Sitek's role in producing the album. Ben Schumer, writing for PopMatters, said, "he seems to have carried over that 'cough medicine/Tinkerbell' vibe from his time working with Scarlett Johansson," but added that Miranda "is overwhelmed by her collborators." Schumer also noted that the album sounded too much like a TV on the Radio album. Conversely, Drowned in Sound's David Renshaw commented that "Sitek’s production is impressive throughout and shows a less seen side to his technique."

Verbicide Magazine placed the album at No. 33 on the Top 50 Albums of 2010.

== Singles ==
- "Forest Green, Oh Forest Green" was released as the album's lead single on November 9, 2009, in the UK and November 17 in the United States. Miranda recorded a cover of Yoko Ono's "Nobody Sees Me Like You Do" as a B-side for the single.
- "Waves" was released as the album's second single on April 26, 2010, and received positive reviews for its production and vocals. On March 24, 2010, the New York Post offered a free download of the single on its website.

== Promotion ==
To promote The Magician's Private Library, Miranda released the limited edition EP Sleep on Fire on June 9, 2009. Only 1,000 copies were pressed. Miranda also released an EP titled Choose to See, which included her cover of Yoko Ono's "Nobody Sees Me Like You Do" as well as covers of David Byrne ("Glass, Concrete & Stone"), When in Rome ("The Promise"), Swans ("God Damn the Sun"), and Lauryn Hill ("Ex-Factor") that was included with the purchase of The Magician's Private Library at Rough Trade shops.

Miranda toured as the opening act on Tegan and Sara's US tour. Miranda also toured as a supporting act on the Xx Tour by the xx, the Lungs Tour by Florence and the Machine, and as part of the 2010 Latitude Festival and Super Bock Super Rock festival.

"No One Just Is" was featured in the CW television series Gossip Girl (episode title: Dr. Estrangeloved).

== Track listing ==
All lyrics are written by Holly Miranda, except where otherwise noted.

No.	Title	Writer(s)	Length
1.	"Forest Green, Oh Forest Green"	Holly Miranda, Brendan Coon	2:53
2.	"Joints"		5:58
3.	"Waves"		5:05
4.	"No One Just Is"		3:28
5.	"Slow Burn Treason"		5:57
6.	"Sweet Dreams"		3:57
7.	"Everytime I Go to Sleep"		4:07
8.	"High Tide"		4:24
9.	"Canvas"		2:36
10.	"Sleep on Fire"		4:03
Total length:			42:29

iTunes Bonus Track
No.	Title	Length
11.	"Singular Acceptance"	6:11

== Personnel ==
- Eric Biondo – horn
- Stuart D. Bogie – horn
- Jaleel Bunton – guitar, drums, vocals
- Brendan Coon – composer, vocals
- Matt de Jong – design
- Sebastian Mlynarski -photography
- Steve Fallone – mastering
- David Hochbaum – paintings, images
- Kyp Malone – vocals
- Holly Miranda – synthesizer, acoustic guitar, electric guitar, composer, vocals, sleigh bells, toy piano, toy organ
- Chris Moore – engineer, mixing
- David Andrew Sitek – producer, organ, bass guitar, programming, sampling, mellotron, mixing
- Zeph Sowers – mixing
- Sugar Rose – bass, percussion, vocals, producer
- Marques Toliver – strings, violin

== Charts ==
Chart (2010)	Peak position
Belgium Heatseekers (Ultratop Wallonia)	15
U.S. Billboard Top Heatseekers	40

== Release history ==
Region	Date	Format	Label
Belgium	February 19, 2010	CD, LP, digital download	XL Recordings, V2 Records
United Kingdom	February 22, 2010	CD, LP, digital download	XL Recordings
United States	February 23, 2010	CD, LP, digital download	XL Recordings
Germany	February 26, 2010	CD, LP, digital download	XL Recordings, Beggars
