= ENTITY Mag =

Media arm of ENTITY Academy, in Nevada, US

ENTITY Logo

ENTITY Mag is the media arm of ENTITY Academy, a digital media and education platform established in Los Angeles, California focused on educating and empowering women through mentorship. It is currently headquartered in Henderson, Nevada.

Founded in 2016 by Jennifer Schwab, ENTITY Mag was launched in conjunction with ENTITY Academy, an education and mentorship program for college students and recent graduates.

== History ==
The company’s first headquarters was located in Los Angeles in a building that used to be a meeting place for the Knights of Pythias, a men’s organization. Schwab’s goal was to turn this former “boys’ club” into a space that modernizes education for women; where up-and-coming female professionals could learn, thrive, and support each other. ENTITY ran their Academy programs in this building every summer from 2016-2019, before switching to all-online offerings in 2020 and beyond.

ENTITY is primarily known for its career advice and mentorship. and reaches around 15 million people each month across platforms with articles about career, personal growth, self-care, relationships, and profiles of inspirational women. All of the articles on ENTITY Mag’s website fall under their main content pillars: truth, inspiration, courage, and humor.

During ENTITY’s first upskilling program in 2016, the mentees who attended were given the opportunity to write articles alongside the Mag’s full-time staff. The mentees had daily lessons in search engine optimization, sourcing and fact-checking, and writing for the web. The articles they wrote became critical pieces in their professional portfolios. During all subsequent iterations of the ENTITY Academy Writer’s Collective, writing and publishing articles continues to be a staple facet of the program.

== Events ==
In July 2018, ENTITY Mag hosted the Love Yourself Summit which brought together women from all over the county for a conference about self-care. The event featured former Disney Channel actor Alyson Stoner as the featured speaker.

In June 2019, ENTITY Academy began its summer program with a kickoff celebration in collaboration with Soho Muse. The event featured award-winning actress Patricia Arquette as the main speaker. Additional speakers at the event included Soho Muse founder Consuleo Vanderbilt Costin and celebrity hairstylist Tara Smith.

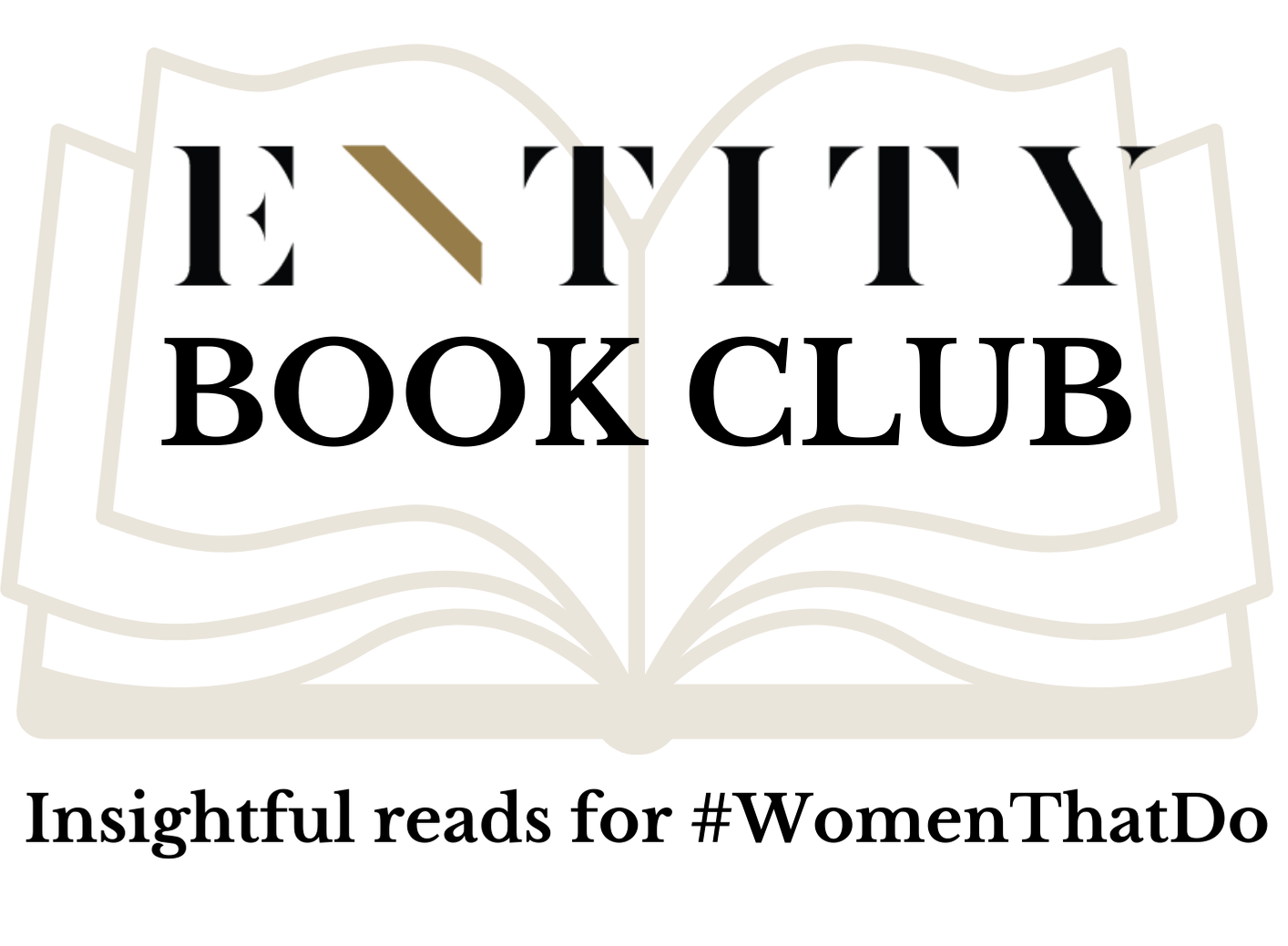
ENTITY Book Club logo

In February 2021, ENTITY launched a quarterly book club for ENTITY Academy students as well as its community as a whole. ENTITY’s Book Club focused on novels, historical nonfiction, and memoirs written by female authors, all of whom were interviewed at the club’s meetings. The books were chosen by bestselling writer, actress, and documentarian Leslie Zemeckis. Zemeckis also led the book club meetings and acted as a moderator.

== Press ==
ENTITY originally made headlines in 2017 when it was the first to report that Harvey Levin had a meeting in the Oval Office with Donald Trump shortly after taking office.

ENTITY developed their own personality test called the EN Personalities quiz with elements of the Myers-Briggs personality assessment. It was featured in a 2018 Bustle article called “11 Online Quizzes That Help Determine Your Biggest Personality Strengths & Flaws.”
