= Holly Miranda =

American musician (born 1982)

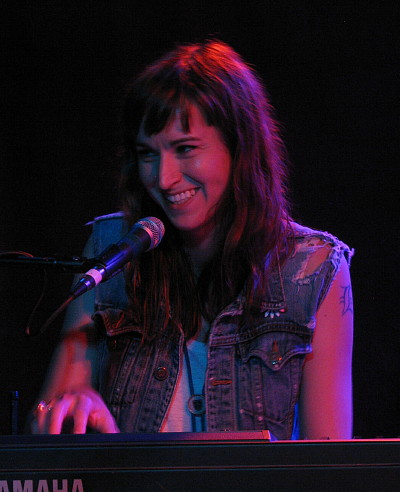
- Miranda performing as part of the Asbury Cafe Series at The Saint in Asbury Park, 2015

Background information
- Born: 21 September 1982 (age 43); Detroit, Michigan, United States
- Occupations: Musician, singer-songwriter
- Years active: 2003–present
- Label: Dangerbird Records
- Website: Official Site

Holly Miranda (born 21 September 1982) is an American singer-songwriter and musician. Besides being trained in piano, Holly is a self-taught guitar and trumpet player. In 2001, she recorded High Above The City, a 20-track solo album available only at shows. In the fall of 2003, Holly met and teamed up with Alex Lipsen, producer and keys player. The project evolved into The Jealous Girlfriends, a four-piece band based in Williamsburg, Brooklyn.

== Early life ==
Miranda grew up singing in church, in Detroit, learning piano at age six and picking up the guitar at 14, around the time she began writing songs. At the age of 16, she moved to New York City, dropping out of high school and finishing her degree through correspondence. She earned a deal with major label BMG at the age of 17, but the music she recorded for them was never released. Miranda commented on this, saying: "I ended up walking away from [it]. It's, like, in a safe somewhere and no one's ever heard it."

== Career ==
=== 2001–2007: Career beginnings, The Jealous Girlfriends ===
After moving to New York, she met the people she'd eventually refer to as bandmates for The Jealous Girlfriends. The Jealous Girlfriends toured with Nada Surf and Delta Spirit, and had their songs featured on TV shows like CSI: Miami, The L Word and Grey's Anatomy. The band received critical acclaim, and is currently on a break, with all band members continuing on their own musical pursuits.

=== 2008–present: Return to solo career ===
After The Jealous Girlfriends went on hiatus, Holly Miranda decided to release a solo album with help from her producer friend TV on the Radio's Dave Sitek. The Magician's Private Library was recorded in 2008. Miranda's publisher Chrysalis Music financed the album, but it wasn't formally released until 2010 after Miranda was signed to XL Recordings. The Magician's Private Library received positive reviews from critics; according to the music review aggregation of Metacritic, it garnered an average score of 68/100. The album peaked at number 40 on the U.S. Billboard Top Heatseekers, becoming her first album to chart on any Billboard chart. "Forest Green, Oh Forest Green" was released as the album's lead single, followed by "Waves".

In support of The Magician's Private Library, Holly Miranda toured as the opening act on Tegan and Sara's U.S. tour. Miranda also toured as a supporting act on the Xx Tour by the xx, and the Lungs Tour by Florence and the Machine. Holly appears as a featured artist in Theophilus London's song "Love Is Real" from his album Timez Are Weird These Days (2011). Her vocals are used in Creep's single "Animals" released on January 17, 2012. She is also the featured vocalist on Mmoths single "All These Things" from his album entitled Diaries released March 2013.

Miranda parted ways with XL Recordings and began self-producing a new album. In 2013 she released two singles on the label Federal Prism formed by David Andrew Sitek. Then in January 2015 she signed to Dangerbird Records to release her new full-length eponymous solo album. After writing in Joshua Tree, she recorded most of the album in Brooklyn, New York, enlisting the help of bandmates Timmy Mislock, Maria Eisen and David Jack Daniels, while taking turns herself on piano, drums, guitar and bass. The album was released on May 18, 2015.

It was announced that Holly Miranda would be releasing a covers EP titled Party Trick on May 13, 2016, via Dangerbird Records.

Miranda released a new album titled Mutual Horse in 2018, featuring a contribution from TV on the Radio's Kyp Malone.

== Personal life ==
Miranda is homosexual, but she doesn't like to label herself when it comes to being talked about as a musician. "I have no problem being out, but I don't think it has anything to do with my music", Miranda said. "I like who I like. I don't want people to not listen to my music because of that and I don't want people to listen to my music because of that. I haven't had to deal with it in a professional way very much yet."

== Discography ==
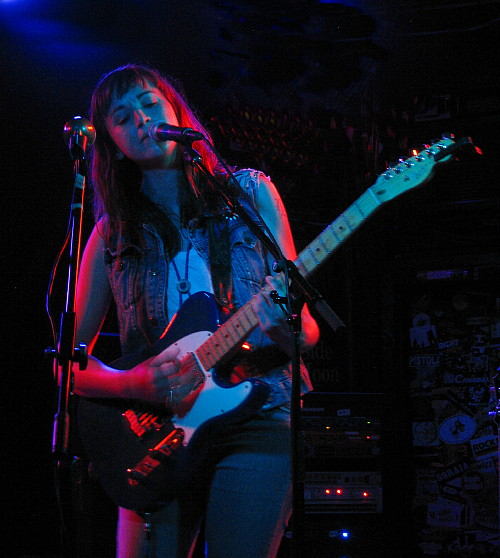
Miranda on stage at The Saint in Asbury Park, 2015.

=== Solo ===
==== Albums ====
- High Above the City: Evolution (2004)
- The Magician's Private Library (2010)
- Holly Miranda (2015)
- Party Trick (2016)
- Mutual Horse (2018)
- Virtual Funeral (2023)

==== Singles ====
- "Forest Green, Oh Forest Green" (2009)
- "Waves" (2010)
- "Desert Call" (2013)
- "Everlasting" (2013)
- "All I Want is to be Your Girl" (2015)
- "Midnight Oil" (2017) (w/ The New Asylum Choir)

=== The Jealous Girlfriends ===
- Comfortably Uncomfortable (2004)
- The Jealous Girlfriends (2007)
