= Forest Green, Oh Forest Green =

Single by Holly Miranda

from the album The Magician's Private Library
- Released: 9 November 2009
- Genre: Alternative
- Length: 6:53
- Label: XL Recordings
- Songwriter(s): Holly Miranda, Brendan Coon
- Producer(s): Dave Sitek

Holly Miranda singles chronology
"Forest Green, Oh Forest Green" (2009)	"Waves" (2010)

Forest Green, Oh Forest Green is the first single by American singer-songwriter Holly Miranda from her album The Magician's Private Library, released 9 November 2009 in the UK and 17 November 2009 in the United States by XL Recordings. It was co-written and features guest vocals by musician Brendan Coon.

== Critical reception ==
Ben Schumer of PopMatters described the song as "the album's lone knockout: a woozy, twinkling march greatly abetted by the Antibalas horn section," yet noted, "Miranda sounds like a guest on her own song."

== Track listing ==
No.	Title	Writer(s)	Length
1.	"Forest Green, Oh Forest Green"	Holly Miranda, Brendan Coon	2:59
2.	"Nobody Sees Me Like You Do""	Yoko Ono	3:54

== Release history ==
Region	Date	Format	Label
United Kingdom	9 November 2009	Digital download	XL Recordings
United States	17 November 2009	Digital download	XL Recordings
