= Comfortably Uncomfortable =

Studio album by The Jealous Girlfriends
- Released: 22 August 2005
- Genre: Rock
- Length: 32:45
- Label: Sweet Spot

The Jealous Girlfriends chronology
Comfortably Uncomfortable (2005)	The Jealous Girlfriends (2007)

Professional ratings
Review scores
Source	Rating
AllMusic	link

Comfortably Uncomfortable is the debut album from American rock band the Jealous Girlfriends. It was self-released on August 22, 2005.

== Track listing ==
1. "Birthday Song" - 3:13
2. "Diffusive Dreaming" - 2:23
3. "Lay Around" - 5:21
4. "Airport Security" - 3:50
5. "Mother May I" - 3:11
6. "Whoever You Are" - 3:40
7. "Please, Please, Please Let Me Get What I Want" - 3:48
8. "Indifference" - 7:19
