= Consuelo Costin =

American singer-songwriter (born 1979)

Consuelo Vanderbilt Costin
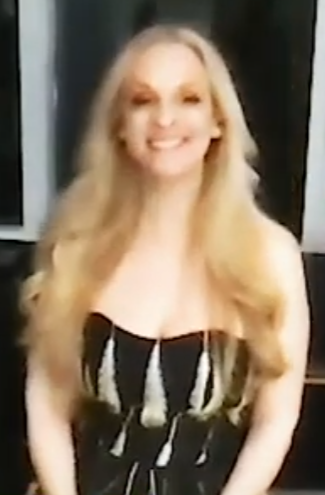
- In a 2021 interview
- Born: February 21, 1979 (age 47); New York
- Other names: Consuelo Costin, Rebel Heiress
- Occupations: Singer-songwriter, actress, spokesmodel, entrepreneur, philanthropist
- Spouse: Rafael Feldman (m. 2007)
- Website: costinmusic.com

Consuelo Vanderbilt Costin (born 1979) is an American singer, composer, songwriter, actress, spokesmodel, entrepreneur and philanthropist, also known by the shortened name of Consuelo Costin.

She frequently gives press interviews that cite her as the "Rebel Heiress" and seventh generation descendant of railroad tycoon, Cornelius Vanderbilt.

== Early life and education ==
Costin was born in [New York City] on February 21, 1979, as a maternal descendant of the Vanderbilt family. Her mother is Serena Vanderbilt Van Ingen McCallum, a family and events photographer in Tiburon, California, and Brackenridge Costin, a life coach to entertainment people at his own firm, BCC & Associates, in Los Angeles. She grew up in London, England, and studied in Florence at the British Institute.

== Career ==
=== Singer-songwriter ===
In 2011, Costin performed at the Capital Pride parade. Her single Feel So Alive reached #23 on the Billboard charts in 2012, and she performed the song on the ZDF prime time show Fernsehgarten in August.

In 2013, Costin was the cover personality of 25A Magazine, for the July/August summer issue She was one of the personalities featured in two episodes of the ProSieben access prime time TV show Taff, "Rockin' Berlin" in 2013, which aired in a number of European countries. The same year she was invited to the red carpet of the German music industry's Echo (music award) and to the Galeries Lafayette 2013 spring/summer fashion show.

Costin recorded two more singles in the US Dance Billboard charts: Body Needs and Here We Go reached respectively #5 and #15 in 2014. That year she appeared on the cover of Raine Magazine in the USA first quarter issue. In Germany, Costin was featured in November and December 2014 in six episodes of the N-TV luxury lifestyle TV documentary show Premium Lounge, which was aired in Germany, Switzerland and Luxembourg.

In 2015, Costin released a vanity album, I'm Just Me.

=== Actress and reality TV ===
She appeared in the short film, Something in Between (2002).

She also created and appeared in a television show about the Vanderbilt family, stating "I've been able to access these places that nobody gets to see."

=== Entrepreneur ===
Costin founded her own record label, C&R Production. She is also the co-founder of SohoMuse, a professional networking website for the global creative community.

She also has jewelry line called Homage, in collaboration with HSN.

=== Philanthropy ===
Costin served for several years as the Vice President of the Ovarian Cancer Prevention Coalition of Greater California.

== Personal life ==
In 2007 (at 30), she married Rafael Feldman, a film and television actor.
