= The Jealous Girlfriends (album) =

Studio album by The Jealous Girlfriends
- Released: April 4, 2007
- Genre: Rock
- Length: 44:50
- Label: Last Gang Records

The Jealous Girlfriends chronology
Comfortably Uncomfortable (2004)	The Jealous Girlfriends (2007)

Professional ratings
Review scores
Source	Rating
AllMusic	3.5/5 stars
Pitchfork Media	(6.7/10)
Prefix	(6.5/10)
SPIN	3.5/5 stars

The Jealous Girlfriends is the second album from the American rock band The Jealous Girlfriends.

== Track listing ==
All lyrics are written by the Jealous Girlfriends.

No.	Title	Length
1.	"Secret Identity"	3:51
2.	"How Now"	3:38
3.	"The Pink Wig to My Salieri"	4:01
4.	"Roboxulla"	3:19
5.	"I Quit"	3:28
6.	"Organs on the Kitchen Floor"	3:31
7.	"Hieroglyphics"	5:24
8.	"Something in the Water"	2:49
9.	"Gift Horse"	3:39
10.	"Machines"	5:58
11.	"Carry Me"	5:12
