= The Jealous Girlfriends =

American rock band

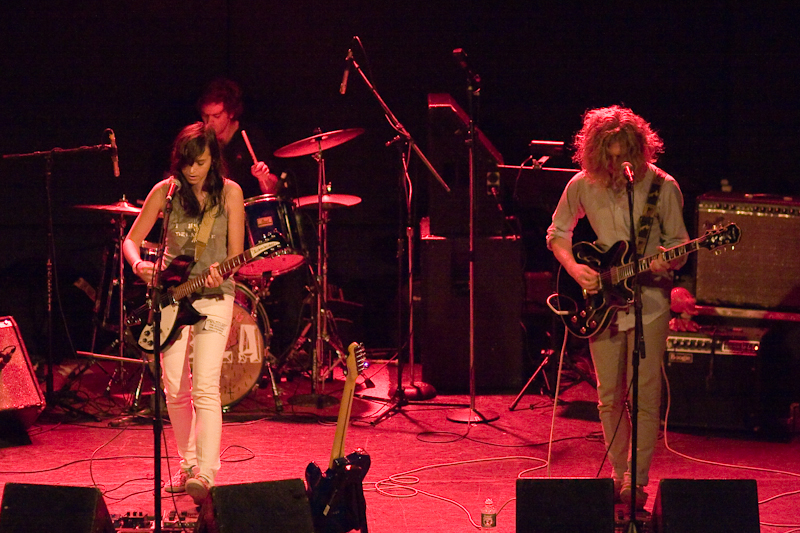
- Bowery Ballroom 2007

Background information
- Origin: Brooklyn, New York, U.S.
- Genres: Rock, alternative rock
- Years active: 2003–present
- Members: Holly Miranda; Joshua Stone Abbott; Alex Lipsen; Mike Fadem
- Website: Official Myspace

The Jealous Girlfriends is a rock band based in Brooklyn, New York. Their music video for "How Now", directed by Sarah Soquel Morhaim, won first place for the iPod Music Video Contest.

== Biography ==
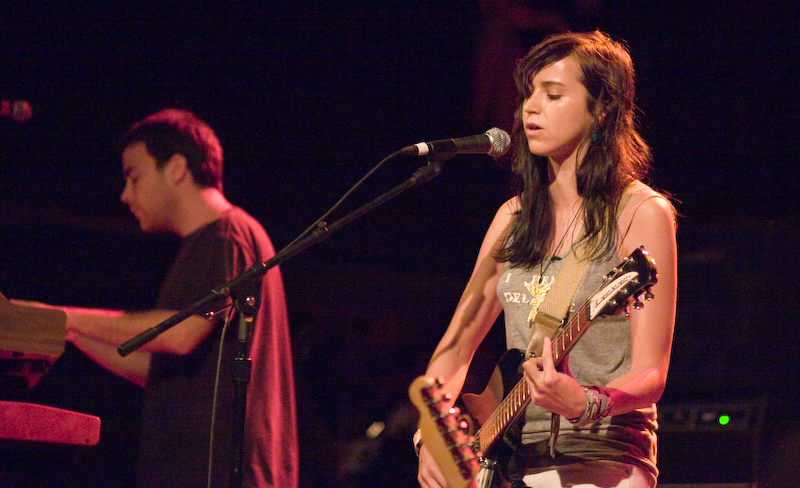
Courtesy Bob Sanderson

The band was formed in 2003 by Holly Miranda (vocals/guitar) and Alex Lipsen (keys/synth/bass module). Joshua Stone Abbott (guitar/vocals) joined the band as their drummer. Soon after joining, Abbott began singing back up and before long, writing and sharing lead vocal duties with Miranda. In early 2005, they invited Mike Fadem (drums) to replace Abbott on drums so that the latter could move up front to focus on singing and add another guitar to their live sound. They first released an 8-track album titled Comfortably Uncomfortable. The song "Lay Around" played on the Showtime series The L Word during the second season.

In 2007, they released a self-titled second album, recorded with Dan Long at Headgear Studio in Brooklyn. "Roboxulla" and "Something in the Water" were used on the ABC series Grey's Anatomy, while "Carry Me" was featured on CSI: Miami.

In April 2008, they opened for Nada Surf.

== Discography ==
- Comfortably Uncomfortable (2005)
- The Jealous Girlfriends (2007)
