= Red Rockets Glare =

Coordinates: 34.0453°N 118.4219°W

Red Rockets Glare Studios
- Genre: Various (indie rock, indie folk, etc.)
- Founded: Rancho Park, Los Angeles, California (2003)
- Founder: Raymond Richards
- Services: Music production, recording studio, mastering
- Divisions: Red Rockets Glare Records
- Website: Official website

Red Rockets Glare is a recording studio, founded by musician, producer, and engineer Raymond Richards in 2003. The associated record label, Red Rockets Glare Records, has signed bands such as Frankel and the Leviathan Brothers, while artists that have recorded at the studio include The Broken West, Chapin Sisters, The Fling, The Monolators and My Own Holiday. Richards frequently produces albums at the studio, including Catch the Brass Ring (2007) by Ferraby Lionheart and Gorilla Manor (2009) by Local Natives.

== History ==
=== Founding ===
Before founding the studio in 2003, producer and musician Raymond Richards began working as a touring pedal steel guitarist in 2001. He toured with artists including Mojave 3, Hope Sandoval & the Warm Inventions, Lisa Germano and The Brian Jonestown Massacre, while also attending the Academy of Art University in San Francisco from 2001 to 2004. He began collecting vintage gear and building his own microphones and pre-amplifiers, and started working as a producer at Red Rockets Glare in April 2003, founding the studio in the residential Rancho Park section of Los Angeles. The Studio was founded partly to help record the music of his own band, The Idaho Falls.

=== Early releases ===
The Monolators recorded their 2005 album Our Tears Have Wings at the studio, and stated in 2006, "Red Rockets Glare was a converted garage. Unlike our garage, though, it's nice and comfortable and sound-treated inside, and, oh, it doesn't leak when it rains and form large patches of mold on the floor. That is fortunate."

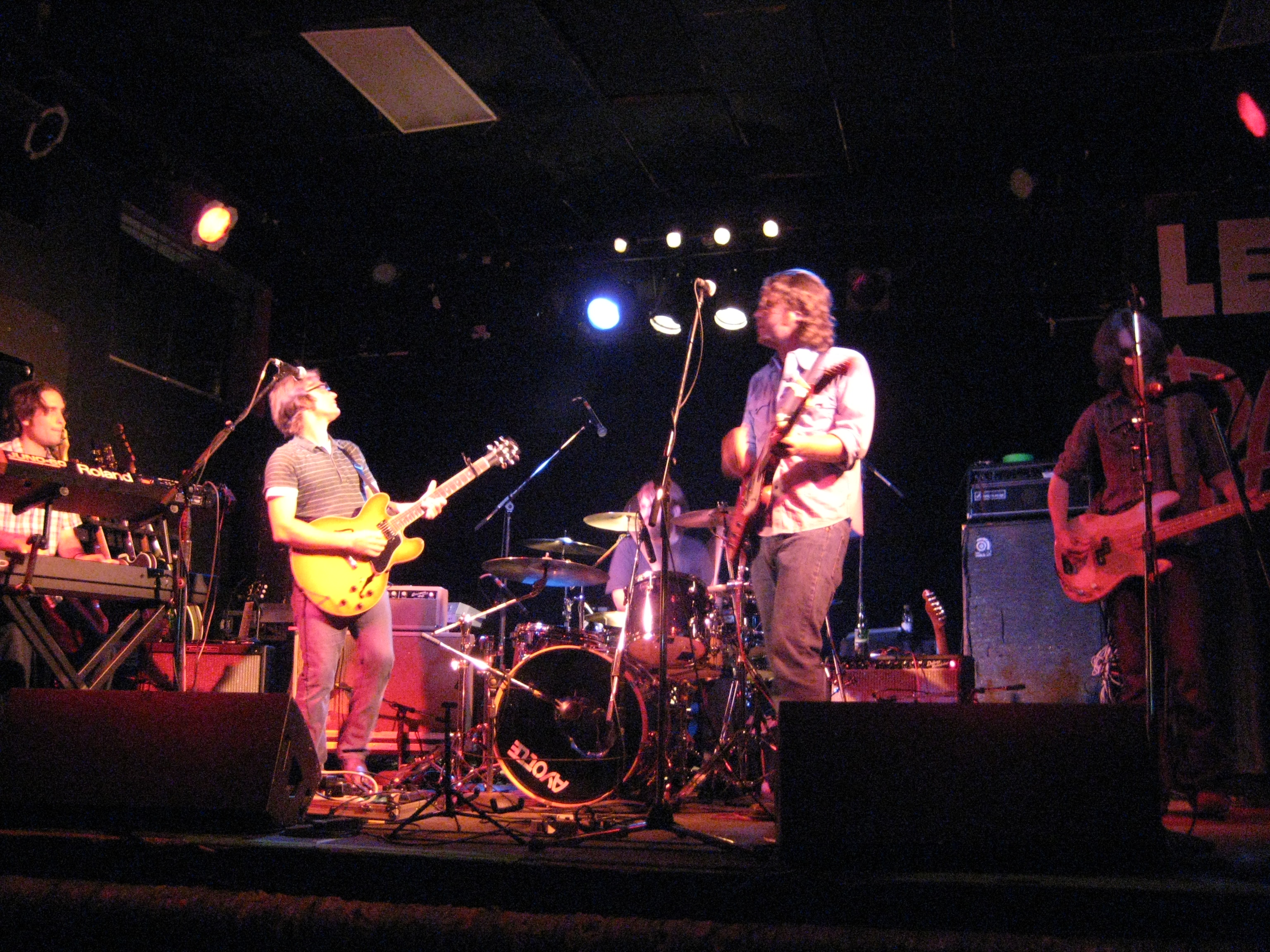
Broken West, an LA power pop band (pictured in 2007), recorded their debut at RRG.

Los Angeles power pop band Broken West recorded their debut album I Can't Go On, I'll Go On at the studio over the course of a year (July 2005-August 2006) with Richards engineering. and Richards worked with Ferraby Lionheart to record 2007's Catch the Brass Ring. "Making this album was a real adventure," Lionheart said in a press release. "I met a guy with a cool little garage studio in West L.A. The place was packed with instruments and vintage gear; I tried to use it all."

Frankel, the folk pop solo recording project of Michael Orendy, has released an album on the Red Rockets Glare record label, Lullaby for the Passersby in 2007. Group Leviathan Brothers recorded their second jazz EP "The Man Who Lost His Shadow" (2007) at the studio and released it on Red Rockets Glare Records. Their third EP, "Short Stories", was released in 2008 and recorded by Richards at Hot Pie Studios in Pasadena, California.

Don't Dance by The Monolators was produced, recorded and engineered by Richards at the studio, and released in October 2008. The Sweet Hurt works with Richards at the studio. About her experience first recording Everyday Mistakes over three days at the studio, "It was the most polished-sounding thing I'd done. I learned a lot from that recording process. It was inspiring. Raymond really encouraged me to keep doing the music thing, so I recorded another batch of songs at the studio and that's how the new EP came about." In June 2008 The Sweet Hurt released In The Shade of Dreams, their new EP, on Red Rockets Glare Records.

=== Gorilla Manor (2008) ===
Local Natives stated in a 2009 interview, "To record Gorilla Manor, we stumbled upon a gentlemen by the name of Raymond Richards who runs a little studio in Rancho Park called Red Rockets Glare." "We contacted him and he had a really great vibe... we clicked right away. We did everything you heard on Gorilla Manor with him." "All of out prior recording experiences had been very stiff and stale so one of our biggest goals going in was to get more of a natural and more relaxed sound." According to a 2010 review, "Local Natives'... self-funded album Gorilla Manor, produced by the excellent Raymond Richards here in LA, maintains everything I love about their live shows – a controlled ruckus filled with passionate percussion and beautiful melodies."

=== Recent recordings ===
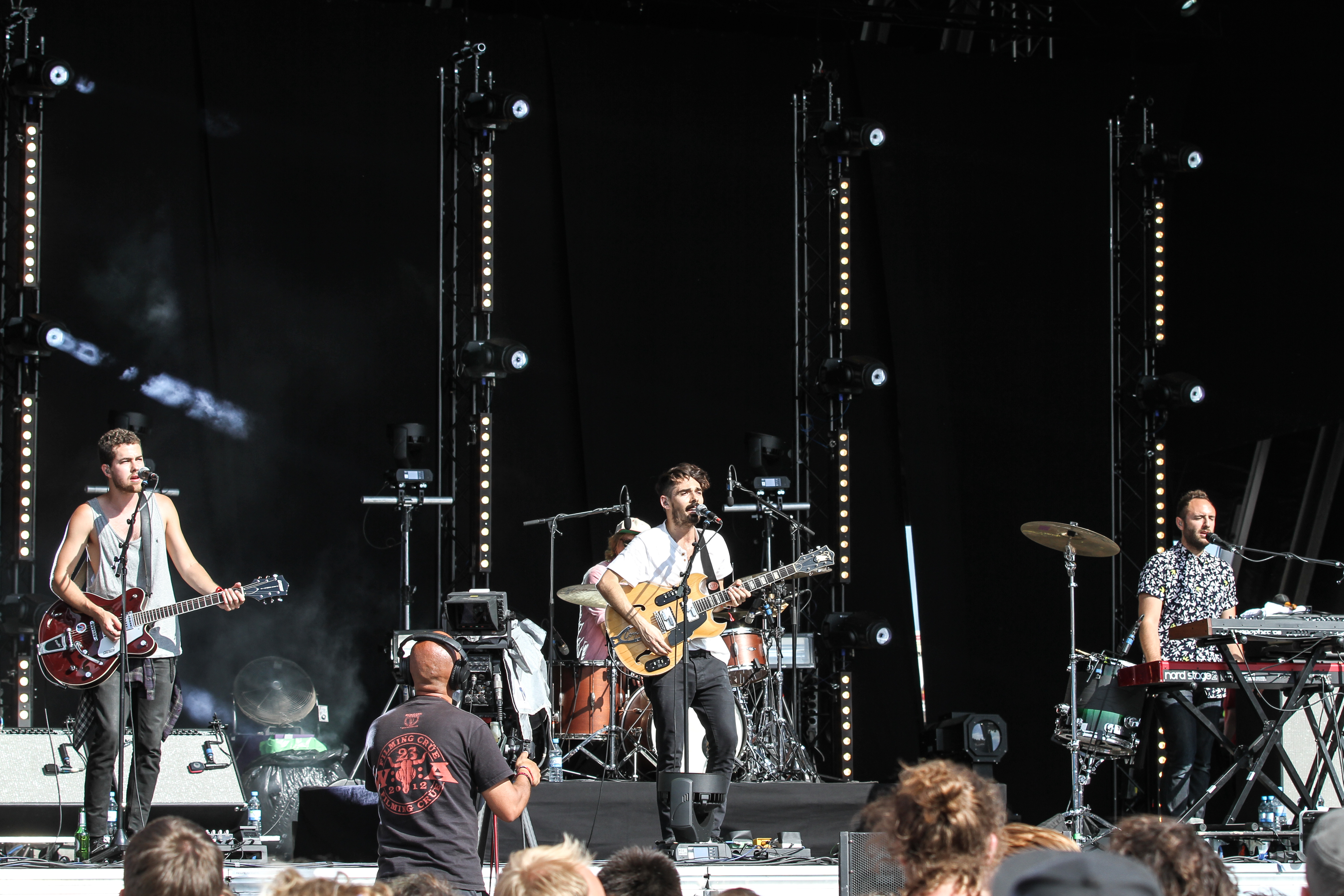
Los Angeles band the Local Natives (pictured in 2013) continue to use the studio.

Bands that Richards produced in 2009 included Salt Petal and The Fling. In 2010 Richards recorded one of the songs on the new Henry Clay People album The Fall Trees, and that year Produced country rockers Honey Honey, and A House For Lions. Miles Kurosky's solo debut, The Desert of Shallow Effects (2010), was recorded at Red Rockets Glare, and according to a review the album "works the same vein of melodic, intelligent pop that deemed so much of his former group’s catalog essential listening." A version of the Kurosky session for Aquarium Drunkard recorded at the studio in February 2010, was played on SIRIUS XMU in April of that year.

In 2011 Richards produced records for Count Fleet, Salt Petal, Will Courtney and Warships. Richards played bass on and produced the new record by Marvelous Toy. The Parson Red Heads have included Richards as an occasional band member, and he produced their 2011 album Yearling, released on Arena Rock Records. The first part of Yearling was recorded over several months at the studio. Artists that Richards produced at the studio in early 2013 included John Isaac Watters, Jody Glenham, The Picture & The Frame, The Blank Tapes, and Local Natives. Staff band Young Creatures also records at the studio.

== Equipment ==
Much of the gear is vintage, related to equipment used by The Beatles in their London studios, or is hand-crafted by Richards. Starting in 2009, the following equipment has been added to the studio:

Organs

- Farfisa Compact organ
- Lowrey Heritage organ, vintage, with a built in Leslie speaker (similar to the one the Beatles used at Abbey Road)

Recording

- Trident 80B Mixing Board, previously owned by Jim James and Dan Fogelberg
- Neve 1084 mic preamp and eq by Brent Averill Enterprises
- Telefunken V72a Tube Mic Preamp
- UA 2-610 All tube mic pre
- Royer-Made U67
- SM-57's, 58's
- Coles 4038 Ribbon Mic
- Sony C38b
- Vintage Sennheiser MD 421
- 2 AKG D19c

Compressors

- Chandler TG-1 Abbey Road Limiter (copy of the compressors on the Beatles Mixing board)
- 2 1176 compressors from the 1970s
- Retro Sta-Level tube compressor
- JDK stereo compressor

Instruments

- Silvertone 1443 Bass with flat wounds (on loan from Jen Finch of L7)
- Roland JUno 60 Synth
- Omnichord synth
- Roland Space Echo, vintage
- Fulltone Tube Tape Echo
- Spring reverb units

Other instruments

- Fender Jazz Bass,
- Several vintage guitars
- 1954s WFL (Ludwig) Drum kit (22, 16, 10)

== Artists ==
Artists who have recorded at Red Rockets Glare include:

- A House For Lions
- Angela Correa (Correatown)
- Andrew Deadman
- The Broken West
- The Blank Tapes
- Calamity Magnet
- Chapin Sisters
- Count Fleet
- The ExFriends
- The Grizzly Owls
- Groupee.com
- The Harpeth Trace
- The Henry Clay People
- The Idaho Falls
- John Isaac Watters
- Ferraby Lionheart
- The Fling
- Frankel
- Jody Glenham
- Laura Laura (Richards plays guitar in 2012)
- Leslie and the Badgers
- Leviathan Brothers
- Local Natives
- Let's Go Sailing
- Marvelous Toy
- The Monolators
- Miles Kurosky
- Mississippi Man
- Naomi Greenwald
- The Parson Red Heads
- The Picture & The Frame
- Red Cortez
- Salt Petal
- Shelley Short
- Stevenson Ranch Davidians
- The Sweet Hurt
- Travel by Sea
- Will Courtney
- Warships

== Discography ==
The following albums were recorded at the studio:

Year	Title	Artist	Founders role	Label
2003 (2007)	King Giraffe	The Parson Red Heads		Yukon Records
2005	Concrete Prairie	The Idaho Falls	Vocals, instruments, production	Self-released
2005	Magnitude	Icebird	Engineering	Flying Squirrel Records
2005	Man and the Cousin	The Harpeth Trace	Mixing	Robert Barry Construction
2006	Everyday Mistakes EP	The Sweet Hurt	Production	Digitalpressure/Wendy Wang
2006	Praise is Poison	The Clean Prophets	Engineering	Tuff Penguin
2006	Our Tears Have Wings	The Monolators		Monolator Music
2006	I Can't Go On, I'll Go On	Broken West	Engineering	Merge Records
2007	Catch the Brass Ring	Ferraby Lionheart	Instruments, engineering, photography	Nettwerk Records
2007	By Night On My Bed	The Grizzly Owls	Engineering, mastering, mixing, instruments	Self-released
2007	Lullaby for the Passersby	Frankel		Red Rockets Glare
2007	Pancho Fantastico	John Hoskinson	Engineering	Tallboy Records
2007	The Man Who Lost His Shadow	Leviathan Brothers		Red Rockets Glare
2008	In The Shade Of Dreams EP	The Sweet Hurt		Red Rockets Glare
2008	Short Stories	Leviathan Brothers		Red Rockets Glare
2008	Don't Dance	The Monolators	Engineering, production	Monolator Music
2008	On Disappearing	The Harpeth Trace	Production, guitar, mixing	Red Rockets Glare
2009	Chinese Leftovers	Sugarplum Fairies	Engineering, pedal steel	Starfish Records
2009	Your Doll	Lisa Douglass	Engineering	Baby Taste Records
2009	Gorilla Manor	Local Natives	Production	Frenchkiss Records
2010	The Spark	The Idaho Falls	Instruments, production, mixing	Self-released
2010	The Fall Tree	The Henry Clay People	Recording several tracks	
2010	Desert of Shallow Effects	Miles Kurosky		Shout! Factory
2010	Somewhere on the Golden Coast	The Henry Clay People	Engineering, mixing	TBD Records
2011	Billy Jack	honeyhoney	Instruments, production	HoneyHoney Records
2011	When the Madhouses Appear	The Fling	Engineering, pedal steel, production	Lady Monk Records
2011	Yearling	The Parson Red Heads	Production	Arena Rock Records
2012	Murmurations	The Parson Red Heads	Engineering, production	Timber Carnival Records

== See also ==
- List of record labels
