= Palms, Los Angeles =

Neighborhood of Los Angeles, California,

Palms
- Neighborhood of Los Angeles
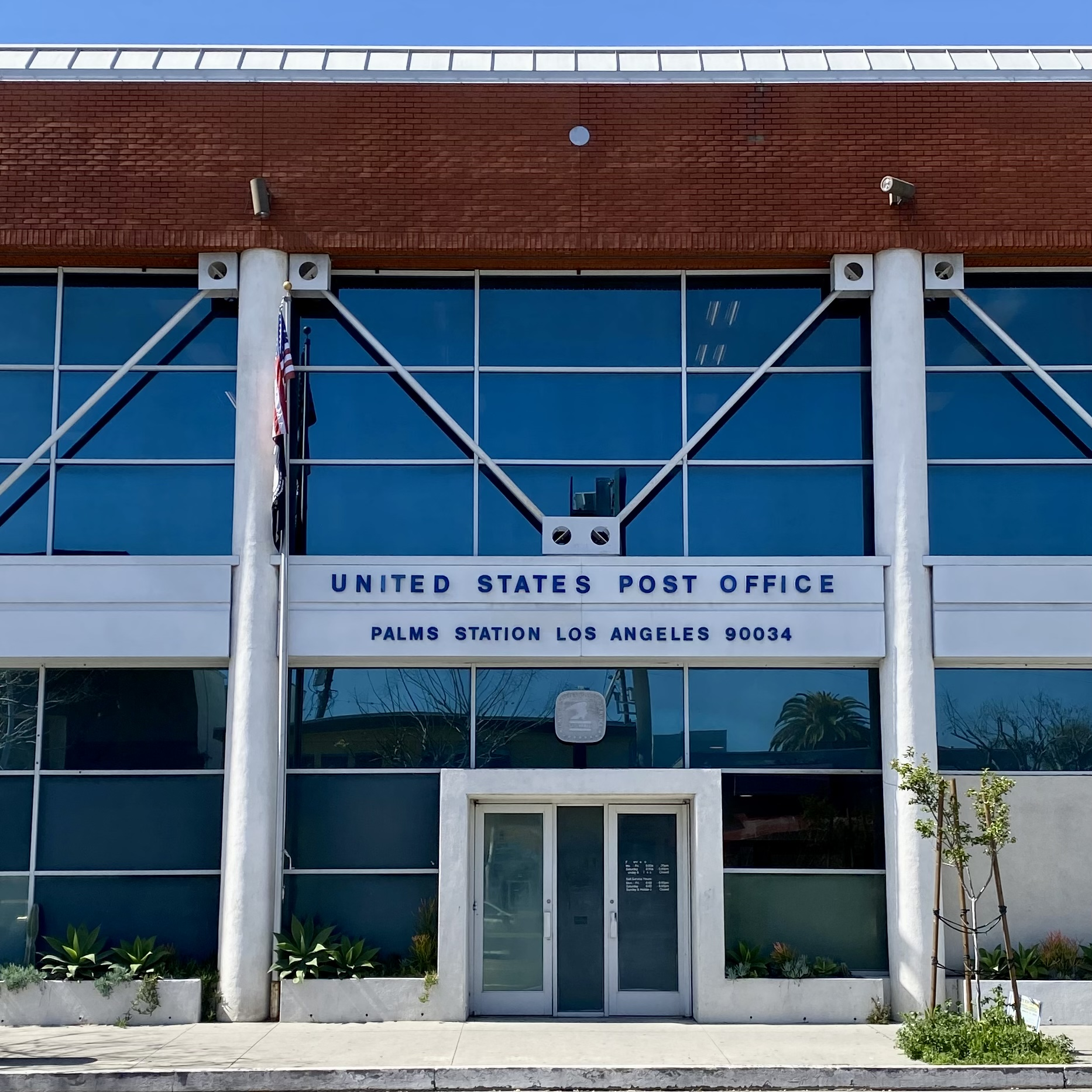
- Palms Station, Los Angeles
- Interactive map of Palms
- Coordinates: 34.023°N 118.405°W
- Country: United States
- State: California
- County: County of Los Angeles
- City: City of Los Angeles

Government
  - City Council: Katy Yaroslavsky
  - State Assembly: Isaac Bryan (D)
  - State Senate: Lola Smallwood-Cuevas (D)
  - U.S. House: Ted Lieu (D)

Area
  - Total: 1.5 sq mi (3.9 km^{2})

Population (2024)
  - Total: 41,710
  - Density: 27,807/sq mi (10,736/km^{2})
- ZIP Code: 90034
- Area codes: 310/424

Palms (originally "The Palms") is a community in the Westside region of Los Angeles, California, founded in 1886 and the oldest neighborhood annexed to the city, in 1915. The 1886 tract was marketed as an agricultural and vacation community. Today it is a primarily residential area, with many apartment buildings, ribbons of commercial zoning and a single-family residential area in its northwest corner.

== History ==
=== Before 1887 ===
==== Rancho La Ballona ====
In Spanish and Mexican days, the area that later became Palms was a part of the Rancho La Ballona, where in 1819 Agustín and Ygnacio Machado, along with Felipe Talamantes and his son, Tomás, acquired grazing rights to 14,000 acres (57 km^{2}) of land. It was thenceforth used as grazing land for cattle and sheep. According to Culver City History, a 2001 work by Julie Lugo Cerra, published for the Culver City Unified School District:

The family lore relates that Agustín was chosen, by virtue of his skill as a horseman to ride his fastest steed, from dawn until dusk, beginning at the foot of the Playa del Rey hills to claim Rancho La Ballona, or Paso de las Carretas. It stretched to Pico Boulevard (abutting Rancho San Vicente y Santa Monica) and to what we know as Ince Boulevard, where Rancho Rincón de los Bueyes began.

Agustin Machado died in 1865, the same year La Ballona School was constructed to serve all elementary-age children within the Ballona School District. In 1871, Ygnacio Saenz established a general store at the crossing which later became Washington Boulevard and Overland Avenue. (Three corners of that intersection are in Culver City and one is in Palms.) The store, which was also a way stop on the county road between Los Angeles and the ocean, also housed the area's first post office.

By 1882, the county's electoral district serving Palms was known as Ballona, with voting at La Ballona School.

==== Land rush and land division ====
Deke Keasbey, real estate investment specialist for Tierra Properties, has noted that:

The Southern Pacific completed its Los Angeles route in 1883, and only three years later the Santa Fe finished its Los Angeles spur. With a huge investment in their new coast-to-coast rail lines and large Los Angeles land holdings, the railroads set forth a long-term plan for growth. Southern California citrus farming was born. Tourism and the building of towns were promoted to attract investors, to raise land values, and to increase the value of railroad shipments

La Ballona Valley was part of that land rush. In 1882, several Midwestern families chartered a reconditioned freight car and left their homes in Le Mars, Iowa, to settle in the valley. They held their first Sunday school in the old La Ballona School on Washington Boulevard, and in fall 1883 they organized a United Brethren Church with 11 members.

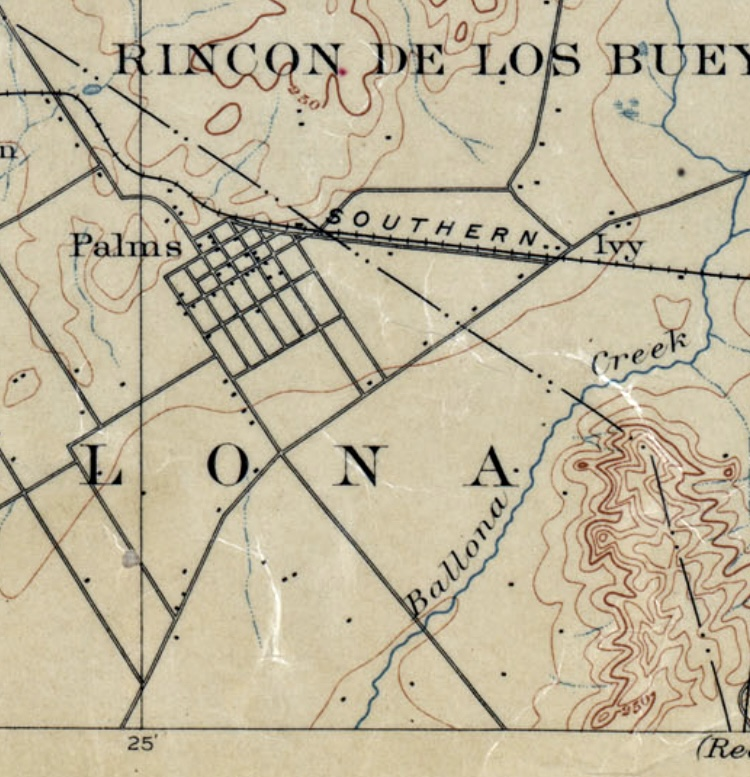
Palms street layout circa 1893

About that time the valley drew the attention of three speculators – Joseph Curtis, Edward H. Sweetser and C.J. Harrison. They paid $40,000 for 500 acres (2.0 km^{2}). They surveyed their land and cut it up, and then they sold it to the new arrivals. They planted 5,000 trees along eight miles (13 km) of graded streets. They named it The Palms, even though they had to bring in palm trees and plant them near the train station. Their first tract map was dated December 26, 1886, which is now considered the birth date of Palms. During this time, the Palms-Southern Pacific Railroad Depot was constructed, serving as one of only two depots between Los Angeles and Santa Monica. It was moved to the Heritage Square Museum in 1976.

The site was midway between Los Angeles and Santa Monica on the Los Angeles and Independence Railroad (now the E Line light rail line.). Before the massive urban growth engendered by the Los Angeles Aqueduct, Palms was located within a farming and ranching area.

=== Since 1886 ===
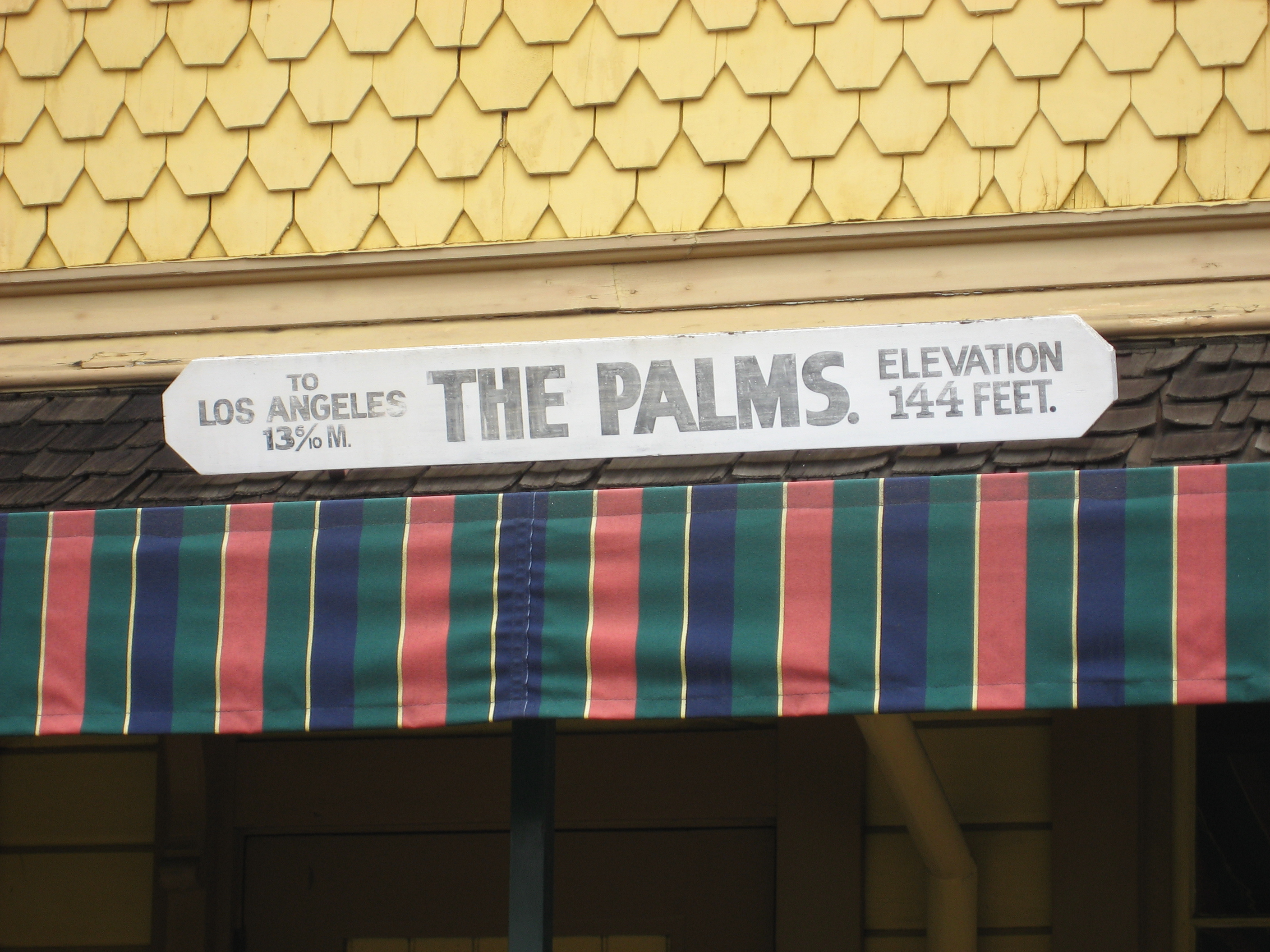
Station sign from The Palms train depot now located in Heritage Square Museum

The subdividers gave the United Brethren Church two lots and $200 in cash to get started. In 1887 the church building was completed, and in 1889 the parsonage was built. In 1908 the old chapel was moved to the rear of the lot and new sanctuary built. In 1916 the old parsonage sold and a new one built. Later a bungalow was added next door to be a Sunday school.

Although its exact location has been lost, contemporary sources indicate the existence of a Palms Villa, Palm Villa, or Villa Hotel at least from no later than 1890 through 1904. It may have stood on Tabor Street, which was known as Villa Avenue at the time.

==== Annexation ====
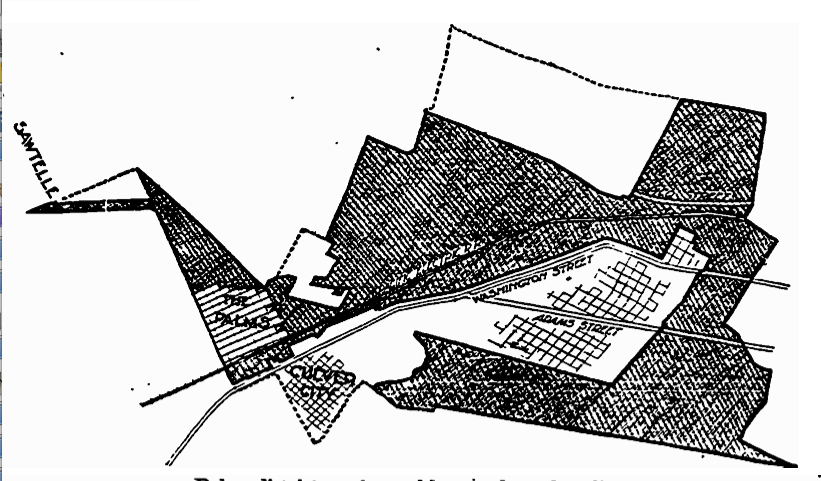
Map from the Los Angeles Times shows area that approved annexation on June 1, 1914. The white areas marked by dotted lines (including Culver City) voted against annexation in May and were excluded from the June vote.

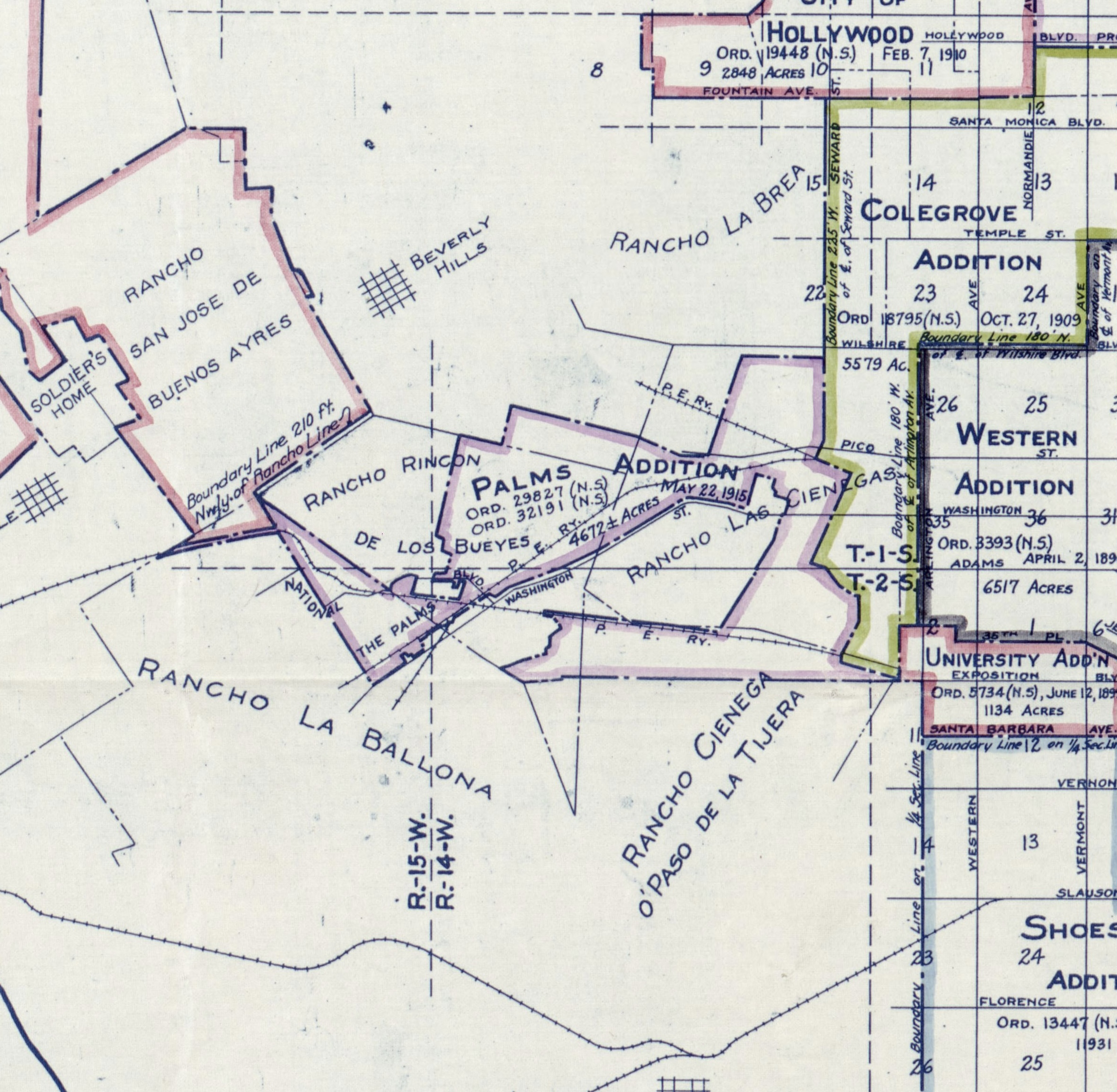
Map depicting boundaries of Palms annexation to City of Los Angeles, 1915

The residential development of a vast area west of the Los Angeles city limits brought a pressure for annexation to the city. Particularly noted was, first, the construction by L.A. of a new outfall sewer that could serve the area and, second, plans by the city engineer for a flood control project for the La Cienega region. Agitation for annexation was begun by Palms residents, but the reach was extended all the way west to the then-separate city of Sawtelle limits so that municipality could be annexed later.

There were two annexation elections. Both were hard fought. The first, on April 28, 1914, was voted down, according to the Los Angeles Times, "because the people in the suburban territory are afraid of the municipal bond craze, of which the power scheme is the last straw, and the threatened burden of extra high taxation." The vote was 387 in favor and 264 against; a two-thirds vote was needed, so the "yes" vote was shy by 47.

A new petition was almost immediately submitted, leaving out all the areas that had voted against annexation. Nevertheless, Harry Culver, the founder of Culver City, denounced the new plan as a gerrymander and opposed it. But The Times wrote:

This district comprises some of the richest country between the city and the sea and is directly in the path of the residence expansion westward. Because its growth is inevitable and its population certain to be greatly increased soon, advocates of annexation believe the necessity for securing adequate and permanent water rights is urgent and are working diligently to secure the required two-thirds vote

On June 1, 1914, the annexation succeeded, by a 342–136 vote, and on May 4, 1915, Los Angeles voters approved the annexation of the Palms district, as well as that of the extensive San Fernando Valley. Both Palms and the Valley entered Los Angeles on May 22, 1915.

==== Naming ====
The Travelers' Handbook to Southern California, published in 1904, stated that "The Palms" was "named from the number of large palms which dot the region for quite a distance near the Southern Pacific depot" and that "The Los Angeles and Pacific road has [been] built via The Palms and Ocean Park to Santa Monica, making its line a belt of sixteen miles or more on each lap."

Over the decades following the turn of the 20th century, the definite article was dropped from the place name. By the 1920s, the name was simply "Palms" on local transit maps.

== Geography ==
Palms has no official boundaries, but as of 2026 is generally defined as Zone 1 of the Mar Vista Community Council (aka Westside Village), plus the Palms Neighborhood Council. The 1886 subdivision map filed with Los Angeles County showed Palms as bounded on the northeast by what would today be Manning Avenue.

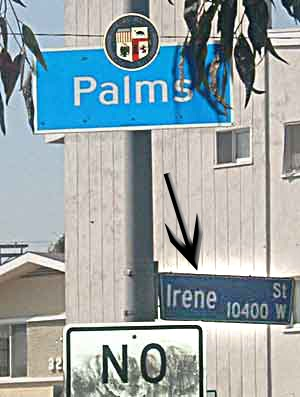
Sign denoting the entrance to the Palms neighborhood on Irene Street

When Palms was annexed to the city of Los Angeles in 1915, the bounds extended westward from Arlington Avenue on the southeast and about Rimpau Boulevard and Wilshire Boulevard on the northeast to Pico and Exposition Boulevards on the northwest. West of Overland Avenue wasn't annexed until 1927.

The portion of Palms girded by Overland, Sepulveda, National, and Charnock Road was developed just before World War II as Westside Village. The City of Los Angeles has posted official neighborhood signs for Westside Village, and it has its own homeowner's association: the Westside Village Homeowners Association.

Climate data for Palms, Los Angeles
Month	Jan	Feb	Mar	Apr	May	Jun	Jul	Aug	Sep	Oct	Nov	Dec	Year
Mean daily maximum °F (°C)	67 (19)	68 (20)	69 (21)	72 (22)	72 (22)	76 (24)	80 (27)	81 (27)	80 (27)	77 (25)	72 (22)	68 (20)	74 (23)
Mean daily minimum °F (°C)	48 (9)	49 (9)	50 (10)	53 (12)	56 (13)	59 (15)	62 (17)	63 (17)	62 (17)	58 (14)	52 (11)	48 (9)	55 (13)
Average precipitation inches (mm)	3.36 (85)	3.62 (92)	2.92 (74)	0.65 (17)	0.28 (7.1)	0.07 (1.8)	0.02 (0.51)	0.10 (2.5)	0.17 (4.3)	0.41 (10)	1.07 (27)	2.00 (51)	14.65 (372)

== Population ==
As of 2024, the population of Palms was estimated to be 41,710. The median household income (population-weighted) is estimated to be $101,971. Two thirds (67.8%) of residents 25+ have a four-year degree, or higher. The estimated median age is approximately 34 years.

=== Demographic Breakdown (2024 estimate) ===
- White (non-Hispanic) 40.2%
- Hispanic/Latino (any race) 23.1%
- Asian (non-Hispanic) 21.8%
- Black/African American (non-Hispanic) 8.3%
- Other/multiracial/NHPI (non-Hispanic, remainder) 6.6%
- American Indian/Alaska Native (non-Hispanic) 0.1%

== Housing ==
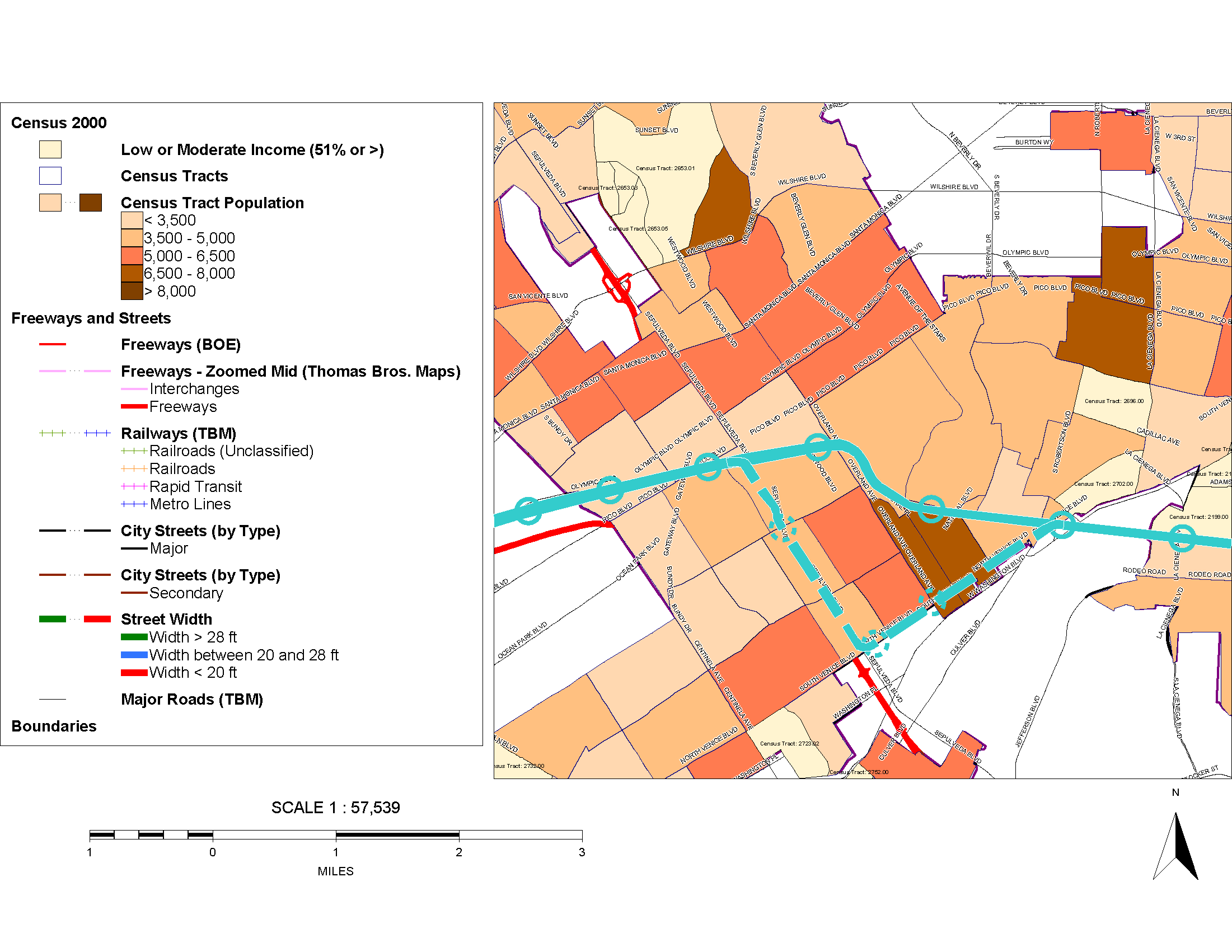
Palms's high density contrasts against lower density of surrounding neighborhoods. Potential routes of the Metro Expo light-rail line are shown in aqua.

Until the early 1960s, most of Palms was single-family homes and small duplexes and triplexes, most of which were built in the Craftsman and Spanish Colonial styles that dominated Southern California in the first quarter of the 20th century. Under pressure to provide affordable housing, the city of Los Angeles rezoned most of the district for large multifamily dwellings. This resulted in most of Palms' historic housing stock being razed and replaced with two-story (or larger) apartment buildings. Very few original houses remain, and many of those are on lots where additional housing units have been built on what were once backyards. Palms is now one of Los Angeles' most densely populated neighborhoods. The goal of the rezoning plan to provide affordable housing proved to be successful, as the neighborhood is now home to one of the largest concentrations of relatively low-cost rental units in Western Los Angeles. As of 2020, the median sales prices of single family homes in adjacent neighborhoods are all upwards of $1 million, while in Palms apartments can be found for as little as $1500 a month.

The housing stock in Palms is now almost completely composed of apartment buildings, and 92% of the population there are renters. In 2000, rentals in the entire Palms neighborhood amounted to 87% of occupied dwellings, compared to 13% of owner-occupied units.> The upscale Westside Village district contains the only significant remaining concentration of owner-occupied single-family homes. While the neighborhood was largely constructed by developer Fritz Burns in assembly-line style just before World War II; most of these houses have been expanded or demolished in the ensuing decades, and the neighborhood today consists of a varied assortment of architectural styles with little resemblance to the original planned community. Apartment buildings, including two UCLA family- and graduate-student housing complexes, line Westside Village's major thoroughfares. Many Palms residents work in adjacent Culver City, which is home to many large office and industrial complexes but has a relatively low population density. Despite being nearly five time larger in land area than Palms, Culver City has a slightly smaller total population.

== Transportation ==
=== Highway ===
Palms is served by the 405 (San Diego) and the 10 (Santa Monica [Rosa Parks]) freeways.

=== Rail ===
Palms is served by the Metro E Line, reactivating Pacific Electric passenger service which had been in place from 1875 to 1953. Service restarted in 2012, with the western terminus located near the intersection of Venice and Robertson Boulevards. The line now runs between East Los Angeles and Santa Monica, with a stop at the Palms station, which opened on May 20, 2016.

=== Bicycling ===
Palms is considerably more bicycle-friendly than many other urban neighborhoods in Los Angeles, and bicycling is very popular owing to the neighborhoods density, young population, and scarcity of parking. Venice Boulevard and Motor Avenue, the two primary commercial corridors in the neighborhood, both feature dedicated bicycle lanes. The construction of the Metro E Line was accompanied by a Class A bicycle trail running adjacent to the tracks along Exposition Boulevard, the Expo Bike Path, which allows for easy bicycle access to the Palms station as well as being popular for recreational use by cyclists and joggers. This path was controversial, however, because of a large gap (stretching from Palms Boulevard to Overland Avenue) in the promised route following the E Line to connect to Santa Monica and the Pacific Ocean.

=== LAnow ===
Palms is served by LAnow a new on demand shared-ride service. Serve started in May 2019, users can reserve a ride through the LAnow smartphone app, online or by phone. Once reserved, users can meet the shuttle at the scheduled LAnow pick-up/drop-off point. Within the service area, pick-up/drop-off points are never more than a few blocks (1/4 mile) away.

== Landmarks and attractions ==
Palms' diversity is reflected in its landmarks. Religious sites include the complexes of the International Society for Krishna Consciousness on Watseka Avenue and the Iranian-American Muslim Association of North America (IMAN) on Motor Avenue.

Palms has many Indonesian, Indian and Pakistani restaurants and businesses. In addition, it is also one of the centers of the Brazilian community in Los Angeles, with a number of Brazilian-oriented restaurants and shops, and one nightclub. In 1979 the original Chippendales erotic male dancing club at 3739 Overland Avenue at McCune Avenue was started by Bengali immigrant Steve Banerjee when he turned his nightclub-disco, Destiny II, into a venue for male strippers.

The area is host to an unusual museum, the Museum of Jurassic Technology, and a research institute, the Center for Land Use Interpretation. It has a legitimate theater, the Ivy Substation, which is now home to the Actors Gang, led by Tim Robbins. The Ivy Substation is within Media Park, which has been leased to Culver City on a long-term basis.

== Government and infrastructure ==
=== Neighborhood council ===
Palms is served by a Los Angeles city-certified neighborhood council, whose governing body is called the Representative Assembly.

The council was certified as part of the city government on December 14, 2004. Its founding president was Len Nguyen, who resigned shortly after his taking office to work for newly elected City Council Member Bill Rosendahl. Todd Robinson succeeded as the second president, but he resigned a few months later. In March 2006 Vice President Pauline Stout moved up to become president. She was succeeded by George Garrigues (2008–09), Dee Olomajeye (2009–12), Eli Lipmen (2012–14), Marisa Stewart (2014–16), Nick Greif (2016–2018) and Alison Regan (2018–2019).

All of the stakeholders in Palms are members of the neighborhood council. Stakeholders include not only those who live, work, or own property in the district but also a broader category of people who can claim affiliation through some other kind of activity on behalf of Palms organizations. Three from that category were elected in spring 2005 to the Representative Assembly, a 13-member governing body composed of officers chosen on a district-wide basis and representatives elected from local areas. Over the last decade, the Palms Neighborhood Council (PNC) has worked to:

- Improve the quality of life in Palms
- Give our neighborhood a voice on issues affecting the community
- Improve the delivery of City services to our area
- Make City officials and Departments more accountable to community needs and concerns
- Represent the diverse people of Palms; including renters, homeowners, employees, merchants, and others affiliated with local cultural, educational, and religious organizations

=== Public safety ===
The Los Angeles Fire Department operates Station 43, which also serves portions of Rancho Park and Cheviot Hills.

Los Angeles Police Department operates the Pacific Community Police Station at 12312 Culver Boulevard.

=== County representation ===
The Los Angeles County Department of Health Services SPA 5 West Area Health Office serves Palms.

=== Post office ===
The United States Postal Service Palms Post Office is located at 3751 Motor Avenue.

== Education ==
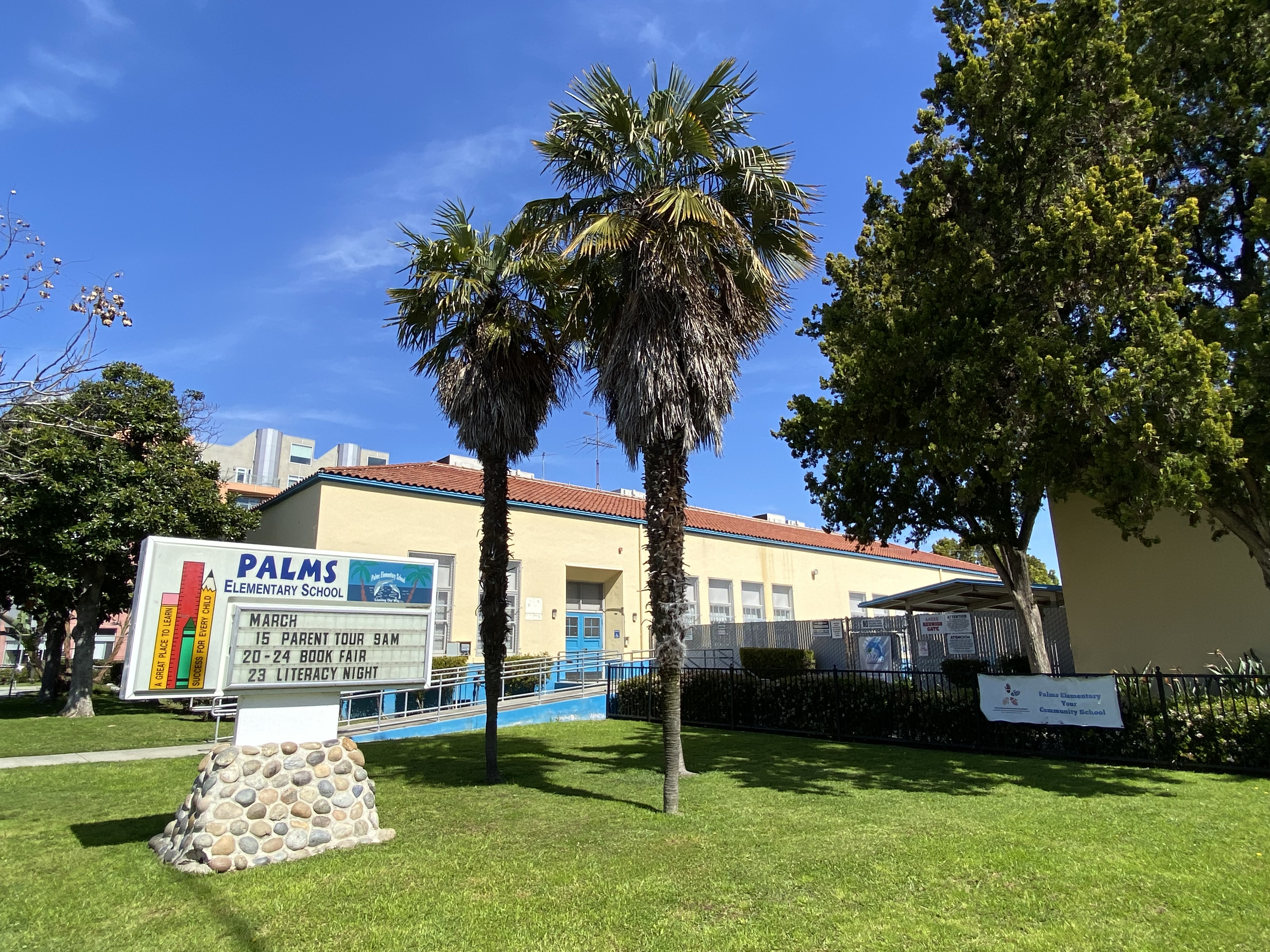
Palms Elementary School

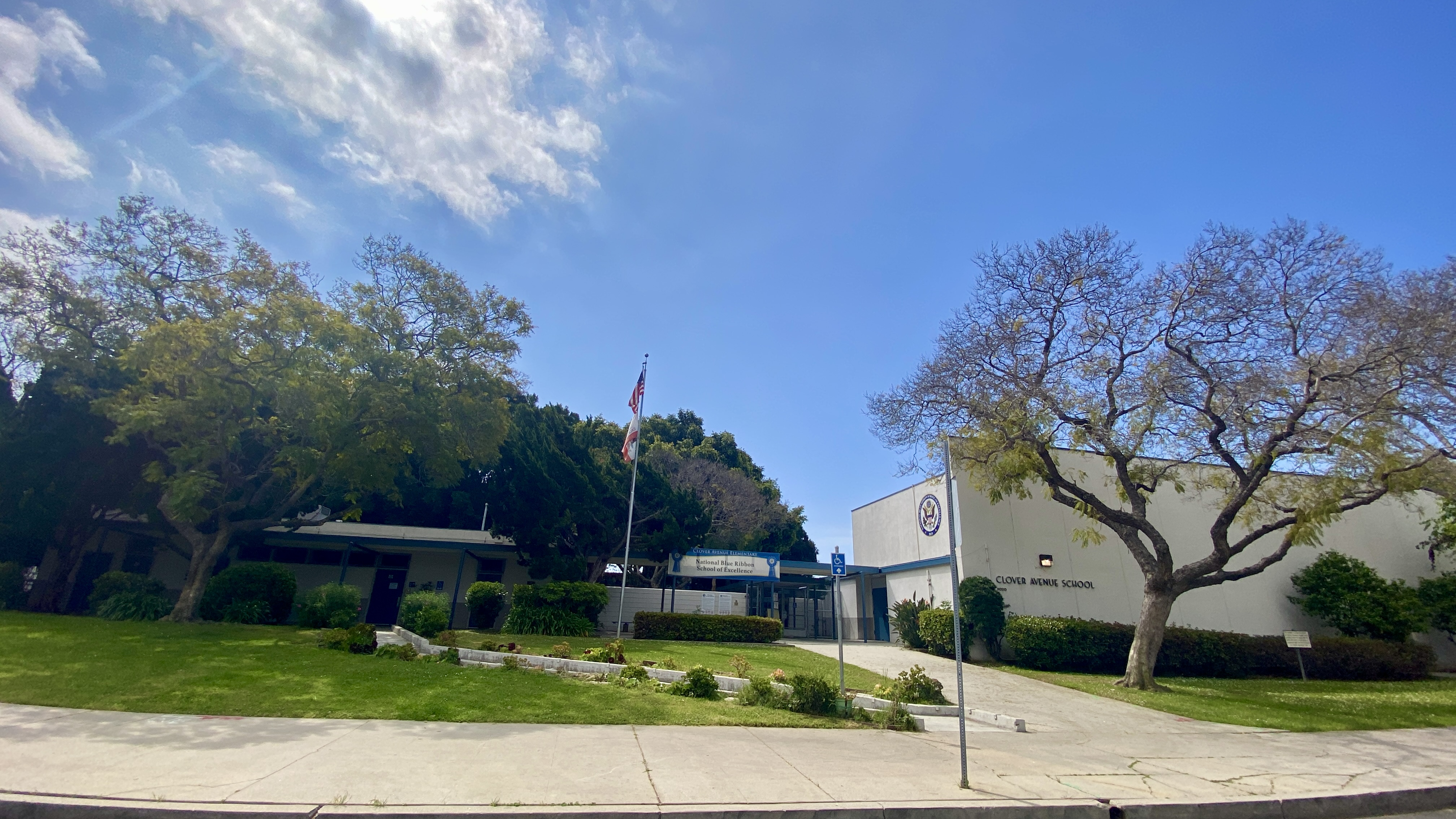
Clover Avenue Elementary

Almost half of Palms residents aged 25 and older had earned a four-year degree by 2000, a high figure for both the city and the county. The percentages of residents of that age with a bachelor's degree or a master's degree were also considered high for the county.

The schools within Palms are as follows:

- Redeemer Baptist Elementary School, private, 10792 National Boulevard
- Clover Avenue Elementary School, LAUSD, 11020 Clover Avenue
- Le Lycée de Los Angeles, private, 3261 Overland Avenue
- Palms Elementary School, LAUSD, 3520 Motor Avenue
- Palms Middle School, LAUSD, 10860 Woodbine Street
- Charnock Road Elementary School, LAUSD, 11133 Charnock Road
- New World Montessori School, private K-6, 10520 Regent Street

Depending on the location in Palms, public high school students are assigned to either Venice High School or Hamilton High School.

== Parks and recreation ==
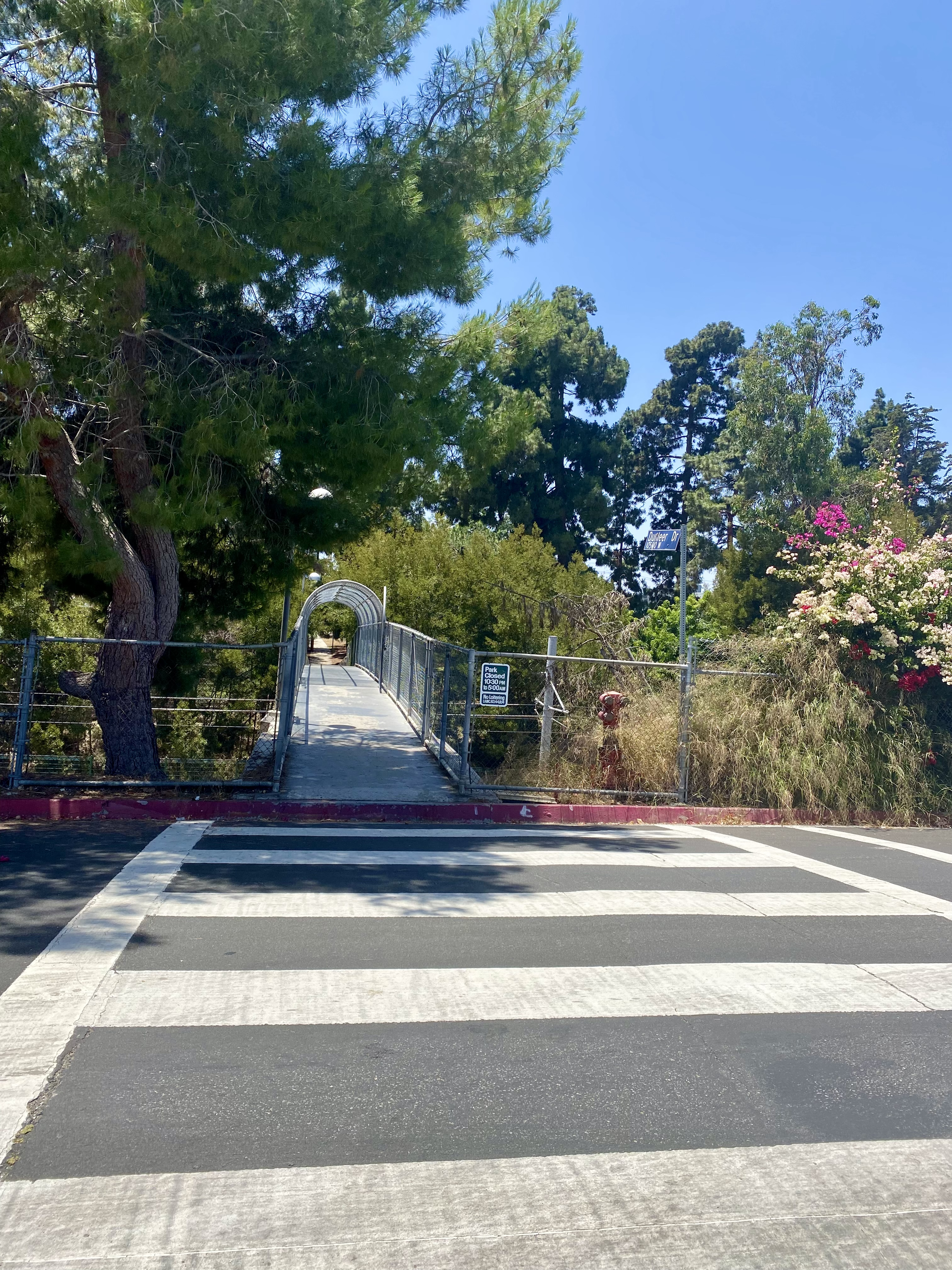
Palms Park Walk Bridge connects to the Cheviot Hills neighborhood across the E Line tracks

Palms Park and Recreation Center are in Palms. The recreation center has an auditorium, barbecue pits, lighted outdoor basketball courts, a children's play room, a community room, and picnic tables. The Palms Park Child Care Center is adjacent to the park. Preschool is offered for children ages 3–5. The center has an enclosed play area.

Woodbine Park is also located in Palms. It is a small pocket park with picnic tables, a basketball court, and a children's play area. It is this park where rapper Snoop Dogg was alleged to have been involved in the shooting death of gang member Philip Woldemariam.

== See also ==
- Santa Monica Air Line

== General and cited references ==
- Garrigues, George, Los Angeles's The Palms Neighborhood, Arcadia Publishing, Charleston, South Carolina, 2009 ISBN 978-0738569932 OCLC 677925321
- US Census tract data for Palms + Westside Village
