= Leviathan Brothers =

- Origin: California
- Genres: jazz
- Labels: Red Rockets Glare, Knee High
- Members: Miles Senzaki; Sean O'Connell
- Past members: Wayne Peet

Leviathan Brothers are an American jazz group. The group consists of Sean O'Connell, on two keyboards and a sampler and Miles Senzaki on drums, both acoustic and electric. Their repertoire consists of rock covers (David Bowie, Cold War Kids, Air) and originals, all played in an instrumental jazz style.

== History ==
Avid fishermen since childhood, it was a during a night-time Marlin expedition off the coast of Cabo San Lucas where they encountered what they described as "two sea serpents twice the size of our boat playfully cavorting before us". The name "Leviathan Brothers" was the term they coined to describe the mysterious creatures they had seen.

Their first album, "Leviathan Brothers", was recorded in 2005 with Wayne Peet and Miguel Sawaya on bass. It was recorded in three hours at Killzone Studios in Mar Vista, California. Their second EP, "The Man Who Lost His Shadow", was released on the Red Rockets Glare label and was recorded in two days at Red Rockets Glare studio in Rancho Park, California . Their third EP, "Short Stories", was released in 2008 and recorded by Raymond Richards at Hot Pie Studios in Pasadena, California.

== Discography ==
Year	Title	Label
2006	Leviathan Brothers	Knee High Records
2007	The Man Who Lost His Shadow	Red Rockets Glare
2008	Short Stories	Red Rockets Glare
