= Catch the Brass Ring =

Studio album by Ferraby Lionheart
- Released: September 4, 2007
- Recorded: August 2006–February 2007
- Genres: Folk, indie
- Length: 38:49
- Label: Nettwerk Records
- Producer: Ferraby Lionheart

Ferraby Lionheart chronology
Ferraby Lionheart EP (2006)	Catch the Brass Ring (2007)

Professional ratings
Review scores
Source	Rating
Allmusic	3.5/5 stars

Catch the Brass Ring is the debut album from Los Angeles, California based singer-songwriter Ferraby Lionheart. It was released on September 4, 2007, by Nettwerk Records. The album was recorded at Red Rockets Glare and Hotpie Studios in Los Angeles.

On the recording of the album, Ferraby says this on his website: "The record took a while, due to a lot of starting and stopping, working around downtime, and writing the album as I went. I wanted to capture the intimacy and simplicity of the self-titled EP, but at the same time make a more adventurous record. Plus some of the songs were really calling for an elaborate treatment. This was sometimes difficult to balance, but I think it helped create a nice diversity about the album. Many wonderful folks I've met in LA came out to play horns and strings and drums throughout the process."

A music video was produced for the song "Small Planet." link

== Track listing ==
All tracks by Ferraby Lionheart

1. "Un Ballo Della Luna" - 1:47
2. "Small Planet" - 3:14
3. "Vermont Avenue" - 2:26
4. "Call Me the Sea" - 4:50
5. "The Car Maker" - 4:05
6. "A Bell and Tumble" - 4:18
7. "Under the Texas Sky" - 3:04
8. "Youngest Frankenstein" - 2:49
9. "Before We're Dead" - 3:57
10. "The Octopus and the Ambulance" - 4:08
11. "Put Me in Your Play" - 4:17

== Personnel ==
- Benjamin Adamson – Trumpet
- Andrew Duncan – Trumpet
- Jeanie Lim – Viola
- Ferraby Lionheart – Guitar, Percussion, Piano, Glockenspiel, Vocals, Melodica, Producer, String Arrangements, Design
- Jeff Lipton – Mastering
- Dan Long – Engineer, Mixing
- Raymond Richards – Pedal Steel, Glockenspiel, Engineer, Photography
- Jessica Thompson – Mastering Assistant
- Dan Weinstein – Sousaphone
