= Sticky thread =

Sticky thread may refer to:

- A prioritized sticky thread or pinned thread in Internet forums
- A thin material known for its stickiness such as spider silk
- "Sticky Thread", a song by Local Natives from their 2009 album Gorilla Manor
