= My Last Breath (disambiguation) =

"My Last Breath" is a song by James Newman, the United Kingdom's Eurovision entry for 2020.

My Last Breath may also refer to:

- My Last Breath, 1994 English title of autobiography of Luis Buñuel Mon Dernier Soupir, also published as My Last Sigh
- "My Last Breath", song by Evanescence from album Fallen
- "My Last Breath", single by Battery
- "My Last Breath", song by Nyles Lannon

== See also ==
- "Until My Last Breath", a 2010 song by Tarja
