= Gorilla Manor =

Studio album by Local Natives
- Released: November 2, 2009 (UK); February 16, 2010 (US)
- Studio: Red Rockets Glare (Rancho Park, California), Hot Pie Studios (Pasadena, California)
- Genre: Indie rock; post-punk revival; indie folk
- Length: 52:40
- Label: Infectious; Frenchkiss Records
- Producer: Local Natives

Local Natives chronology
Gorilla Manor (2009)	Hummingbird (2013)

Professional ratings
Aggregate scores
Source	Rating
Metacritic	80/100
Review scores
Source	Rating
AllMusic	3.5/5 stars
BBC Music	(positive)
Drowned in Sound	8/10 stars
The Fly	4/5 stars
The Guardian	3/5 stars
Los Angeles Times	3/4 stars
musicOMH	4.5/5 stars
Paste	7.4/10
Pitchfork	8.4/10
PopMatters	7/10 stars
Tiny Mix Tapes	3/5 marks

Gorilla Manor is the debut album by Los Angeles based indie rock band Local Natives. It was released in the United Kingdom on November 2, 2009, on Infectious Records, and February 16, 2010, by Frenchkiss Records in the United States.

The album was self-funded by the band and recorded by Raymond Richards in his own Red Rockets Glare studio, in West Los Angeles. It was produced in collaboration by Richards and the band. It was mixed by Dan Long and Hugo Nicholson. Gorilla Manor was named after the house they all shared in Orange County, where most of the album was written. “It was insanely messy and there were always friends over knocking around on guitars or our thrift store piano,” said guitarist Ryan Hahn.

The album debuted in the Billboard 200 and at #3 in the New Artist Chart.

== Track listing ==
All tracks are written by Local Natives, except "Warning Sign" by David Byrne and Chris Frantz.

No.	Title	Length
1.	"Wide Eyes"	4:26
2.	"Airplanes"	3:58
3.	"Sun Hands"	4:51
4.	"World News"	4:32
5.	"Shape Shifter"	5:30
6.	"Camera Talk"	3:45
7.	"Cards & Quarters"	4:00
8.	"Warning Sign" (Talking Heads cover)	4:12
9.	"Who Knows Who Cares"	3:53
10.	"Cubism Dream"	4:00
11.	"Stranger Things"	5:46
12.	"Sticky Thread"	3:48
Total length:		52:40

Amazon MP3 bonus track
No.	Title	Length
13.	"Only Son (B-Side)"	4:02
Total length:		56:42

iTunes bonus tracks
No.	Title	Length
13.	"Sun Hands (KEXP Session)"	5:44
14.	"Camera Talk (KEXP Session)"	3:51
Total length:		62:15

== Personnel ==
- Taylor Rice — vocals, rhythm guitar
- Kelcey Ayer — vocals, keyboards, rhythm guitar
- Ryan Hahn — lead guitar, vocals
- Matthew Frazier — drums, vocals
- Andy Hamm — bass, vocals

== Release history ==
Region	Date	Label	Catalog
United Kingdom	November 2, 2009	Infectious Records	INFECT109CD
United States	February 16, 2010	Frenchkiss Records	FKR042
