= Ferraby =

Ferraby is both a given name and a surname. Notable people with the name include:

- Ferraby Lionheart (born 1977), American songwriter and recording artist
- John Ferraby (1914–1973), British Baháʼí
- Nicholas Ferraby (born 1983), British cricketer
- Rose Ferraby (fl. from 2015), British archaeologist and artist
