= List of musicians from British Columbia =

This is a list of musicians from British Columbia.

== A ==
- Jeff Abel
- Tommy Alto
- Carolyn Arends

== B ==
- Ashleigh Ball
- bbno$
- Dan Bejar
- Doug Bennett
- Barney Bentall
- Art Bergmann
- Geoff Berner
- Kim Bingham
- Claire Boucher
- Dean Brody
- Chad Brownlee
- Michael Bublé
- Louise Burns

== C ==
- Kathryn Calder
- Sean Casavant
- Torquil Campbell
- Warren Cann
- Michelle Creber
- Allison Crowe

== D ==
- d3r
- Mac DeMarco

== F ==
- Stephen Fearing
- Jon-Rae Fletcher
- Roy Forbes
- Frazey Ford
- David Foster
- Nelly Furtado

== G ==
- Hannah Georgas
- Jody Glenham
- Matthew Good
- Grimes

== H ==
- Tim Hecker
- Bill Henderson
- Rolf Hetherington
- Veda Hille
- Jacob Hoggard
- Chris Hooper
- Tom Hooper
- Paul Hyde
- Joshua Hyslop

== J ==
- Reid Jamieson
- Ingrid Jensen
- Carly Rae Jepsen
- Vincent Jones

== K ==
- Kevin Kane
- Joey "Shithead" Keithley
- Geoffrey Kelly
- Diana Krall
- Kyprios

== L ==
- Tom Landa
- Sook-Yin Lee
- Suzanne Little

== M ==
- Brian MacLeod
- Madchild
- Dan Mangan
- John Mann
- Carolyn Mark
- Hugh McMillan
- Carey Mercer
- Mae Moore
- Moka Only
- Scott Morgan
- Bob Murphy

== N ==
- Bif Naked
- Nardwuar the Human Serviette
- Darryl Neudorf
- A. C. Newman

== O ==
- Oh Susanna
- Neil Osborne

== P ==
- Brandon Paris
- Daniel Powter
- Prevail

== R ==
- Josh Ramsay
- Bob Rock

== T ==
- Kristy Thirsk
- Philip J. Thomas
- Devin Townsend

== U ==
- Shari Ulrich
- David Usher

== W ==
- Daniel Wesley

== See also ==
- List of bands from British Columbia
