= Hideout (Film School album) =

Studio album by Film School
- Released: September 11, 2007
- Recorded: San Francisco
- Genre: Indie rock
- Length: 49:13
- Label: Beggars Banquet
- Producer: Greg Bertens

Film School chronology
Film School (2006)	Hideout (2007)	Fission (2010)

Hideout is the third album by San Francisco-based indie rock band Film School, released on September 11, 2007. The album features a guest appearance by Colm O'Ciosoig from My Bloody Valentine. The album takes its name from a lyric in opening track "Dear Me."

The first single from the album was "Dear Me", released as a digital download and on promo-only 7" vinyl (with different B-sides each) to coincide with the album's release.

The album was recorded with Dan Long and mixed by Phil Ek.

The album sold 900 copies in its first week.

The album has an unknown track hidden in the pregap of track 1.

== Track listing ==
1. "Dear Me" – 5:02
2. "Lectric" – 4:11
3. "Meanmedian Mode" – 0:16
4. "Sick Hipster Nursed by Suicide Girl" – 5:58
5. "Must Try Easier" – 1:02
6. "Two Kinds" – 3:58
7. "Capitalized I" – 5:08
8. "Go Down Together" – 4:30
9. "Compare" – 3:43
10. "Florida" – 5:10
11. "Blizzard Scout" – 2:08
12. "Plots and Plans" – 4:50
13. "What I Meant to Say" – 3:23

== Singles ==
- "Dear Me" ( (United States) promo-only 7" vinyl) (August 28, 2007)
  1. "Dear Me" (Edit) – 4:11
  2. "March Hike" – 3:34
- "Dear Me" ( (United Kingdom) digital download) (October 15, 2007)
  1. "Dear Me" (Edit) – 4:11
  2. "Waste My Time" – 4:19
