= Nyles Lannon =

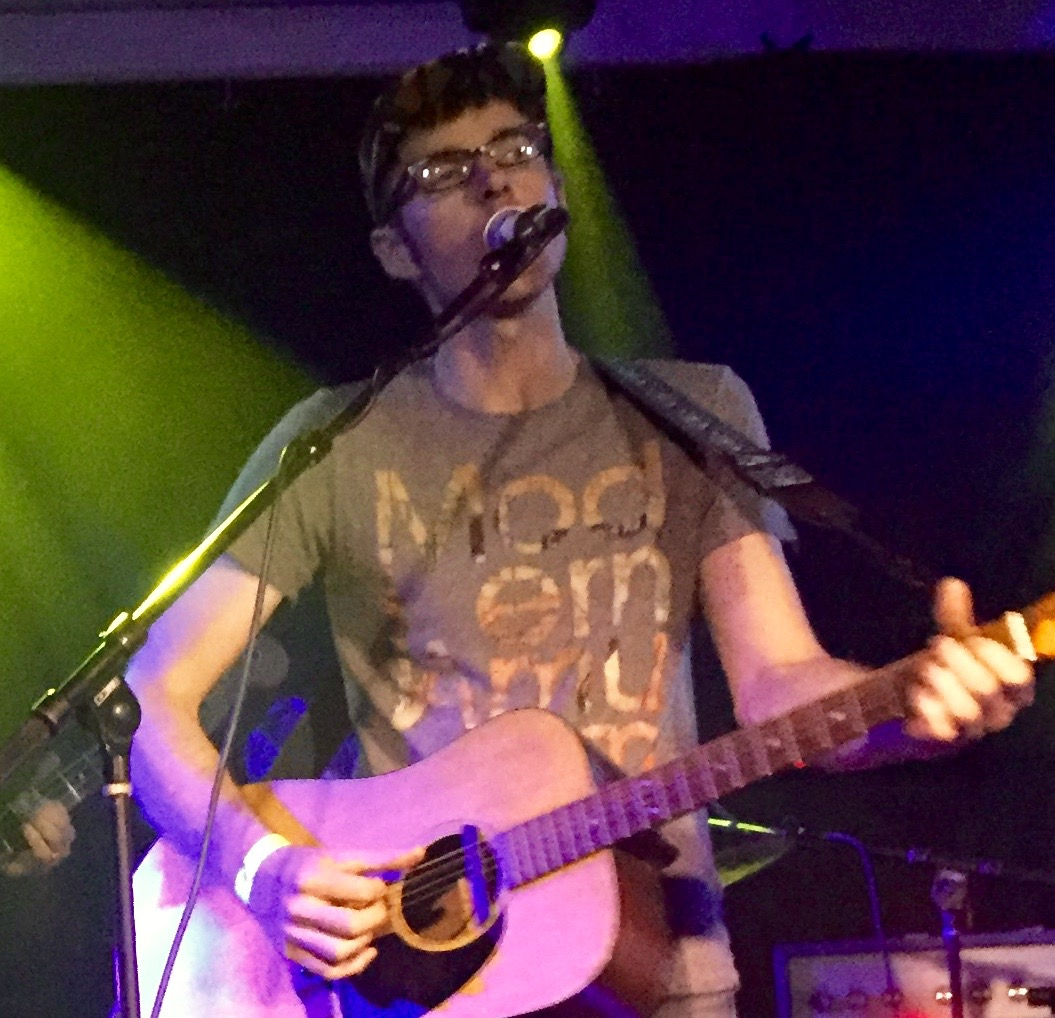
- N. Lannon performing at The DNA Lounge, San Francisco, 12 June 2015

Background information
- Origin: San Francisco, California, U.S.
- Genres: Folk, Rock, electronica
- Label: Badman Recording Company
- Website: www.nyleslannon.com

Nyles Lannon is a musician from San Francisco, California. Lannon makes music under the names Nyles Lannon; n.Lannon; and formerly recorded under the alias of N.LN.

== Style ==
Lannon's music is a hybrid of homegrown acoustic folk, space rock and electronic aesthetics. Although sometimes described as a singer/songwriter, Lannon's music ranges subdued electronic pop to delicate finger picked acoustics to "glitchy" beats and soulful rock. [sic] N.LN, however, is mostly instrumental, abstract electronica.

== Musical career ==
At the University of Pennsylvania, Lannon first tasted a bit of minor success with his band Splendorbin, a post-punk "math rock" band that did well in the Philadelphia area and went on to record with Steve Albini in 1996, but broke up soon after their debut album Stealth came out. Lannon soon had another project, Reizoko, that released the vinyl-only EP T'nance and Tricky Ricky - a spacey, sprawling collection of lo-fi bedroom pop that was harbinger of things to come. During this time Lannon also played in the late Jason DiEmilio's noise band The Azusa Plane, and toured with the band. In 1999, Lannon and Jason Knight (also of the Azusa Plane) moved to San Francisco, and Lannon worked at the music site Epitonic.com for a couple years.

He soon joined the SF band Film School and contributed to their debut, the LP Brilliant Career and toured with the band. In 2003, Film School did a 4-song EP, Alwaysnever, which was released by Scott Kannberg's (of the indie rock band Pavement) label Amazing Grease. Also in 2003, Lannon completed his first solo album, Astronomy for Children, under the name N.LN, which was released on the label Highpoint Lowlife. The album was a collection of abstract instrumental electronic tracks, in the vein of artists like Boards of Canada and Aphex Twin, and was recognized as Grooves Magazine's 'Best Album of the Year' in 2004. Also in 2004, Lannon released the album Chemical Friends, which was a bedroom indie-folk collection of songs and which also featured his voice and lyrics for the first time, earning "Best Album of the Year" from the San Francisco Bay Guardian; "Best Folktronica Artist" from SF Weekly; and generally positive reviews. In 2005, Film School released their Self-Titled album on Beggars Banquet.

Lannon took a break from Film School in 2006, and soon began work as a session musician, and as a writer for various commercial, film, and TV productions. In 2007, Lannon released another solo album, Pressure, his 2nd for Badman Recording Company, but this one under his full name. The album featured a more rock-oriented pop sound. He married in 2008, and his son Skye was born later that year.

Lannon joined forces again with Greg Bertens of Film School and formed the band Sacred Caves, an electronic pop band, and released the Sanctuarium EP in 2012, the same year his daughter Olive was born.

In 2015, Lannon released his 3rd solo album, Falling Inside, again on the record label Badman Recording Company. 2016 saw him also playing with Film School again, playing some live shows and releasing the June EP that year. He also joined the touring band for Rogue Wave as their synth player, culminating with a set at 2016 Outside Lands in San Francisco.

Around this time, Lannon and the other members of Film School rented a studio in Joshua Tree and recorded a bunch of songs, most of which would come out on the LP Bright to Death in 2018, self-released on their HausKat label.

Sacred Caves released an LP Love Comes with a Knife in 2017, also on HausKat.

In 2019, Lannon released The Clouds and the Sea EP on Badman Recording Co. The EP was produced by Count (Tycho, DJ Shadow). He toured a bit on the West Coast but had to cancel some shows from a back injury. 2021 saw the release of Film School We Were Never Here on the new label Sonic Ritual.

During the COVID pandemic, Lannon and his son Skye worked on their first album together, which would soon become the band Nyte Skye. Skye was 12 at the time. Fast forward two years, and in 2023, Nyte Skye released their debut LP Vanishing on the Sonic Ritual record label.

Also in 2023, Film School released the Field LP on Felte Records. The band toured Japan in 2024.

In 2024, Lannon released the debut LP of his project with Alex Kemp called Total Brightness, the Teenage Lie LP.

Also in 2024, Lannon teamed up with Neil Rodenmeyer and his son Skye to form the band National Sweetheart. They started with the EP Foreign Cinema, followed by their debut album All Tramps Set Free, much of which was written during the pandemic. The group followed this with two instrumental albums, Local Television and 29 Palms.

== Other projects ==
Lannon played guitar with the band, Film School, from 2001–2006, and joined again in 2015. They released an EP Alwaysnever in 2003 and the self-titled album in 2006, an EP June in 2016 and the LP Bright to Death in 2019.

Lannon has an electronic project under the name N.LN, and released Astronomy for Children on UK label, Highpoint Lowlife, in 2004. This album was well received, earning 'Best Album of the Year' from Grooves Magazine and 'Album of the Week' from the BBC.

=== Sacred Caves ===
Lannon formed the duo, Sacred Caves, with former Film School collaborator and bandmate, Greg Bertens, and released an EP in 2012 called Sanctuarium.

== Releases ==
- Released in 2004 on the Badman Recording Company label, Chemical Friends won "Best Album of the Year" from the San Francisco Bay Guardian, and "Best Folktronica Artist" from SF Weekly for n.Lannon. Its "Turn Time Around" was featured on MTV's The Real World: Denver and CBS' Cold Case; while the song, "Cruel", was featured on Dirt.
- Astronomy for Children; released in 2004, attributed to N.LN, was well received.
- Pressure, Lannon's second solo album, was released in 2007 on Badman Recording Company; this time attributed to Nyles Lannon.
- Sanctuarium, released in 2012 and attributed to duo, Sacred Caves (Lannon, Bertens).
- Falling Inside, released in 2015 on Badman Recording Company.
- The Clouds and the Sea EO, released in 2019 on Badman Recording Company.

=== Discographys ===
Chemical Friends

1. "The Catch"
2. "Turn Time Around"
3. "Hollow Heart"
4. "My Last Breath"
5. "Fortune Cookie"
6. "Beached"
7. "Demons"
8. "Spy"
9. "The Nature of Things"
10. "Cruel"
11. "Freak You Out"

Astronomy for Children

1. "This Morning"
2. "4 Little Fires"
3. "Spoke Words"
4. "I Never Heard"
5. "That Spun My Head"
6. "Left Bubbles"
7. "In Place Of..."
8. "Thoughts"

Pressure

1. "Hesitation"
2. "Next Obesession"
3. "Did I Lose You"
4. "Slipping"
5. "Lost in the Stars"
6. "The Well Groomed Man"
7. "Better with Nothing"
8. "Crash Landing"
9. "Old Sam"
10. "Elephant Song"
11. "River"

Falling Inside

1. "Kill All These Machines"
2. "Endless Night"
3. "Dreamer"
4. "Another Love"
5. "Submarine"
6. "Queen of Rivertown"
7. "Captain"
8. "Little Indian"
9. "Valerie"
10. "Hole"
11. "Want Me"

The Clouds and the Sea EP

1. "The Clouds and the Sea"
2. "Love Again"
3. "Destination Unknown"
4. "Hiding"
5. "Dreamer - Alex Kemp Remix"
6. "Unicorns"
7. "Captain"
8. "Flooding in the Brain"
9. "Endless Night - Halou Remix"
