= LA Weekly Detour Music Festival =

The LA Weekly Detour Music Festival was a music festival that was held every October in Los Angeles, California. The entire block surrounding Los Angeles City Hall was closed, and three stages were erected for the festival, which lasted from noon to midnight on the day it was held. It was notable for attracting many big-name acts despite its status as a relatively young festival. The festival has been held every October since 2006. The website underwent a large change in July 2008 when the lineup for the third festival was announced. New for the 2008 festival was the BYOB (Bring Your Own Band) Battle of the Bands competition, which features online voting to pick an unsigned artist to play at the festival in 2008. On August 18, 2009, LA Weekly announced via their website that the festival would not take place in 2009 since it has been put "on hiatus".

== Lineups ==
Bands billed as headliners are bolded.

=== October 7, 2006 ===
- **Beck**
- **Queens of the Stone Age**
- **Basement Jaxx**
- Peeping Tom
- Redd Kross
- Blonde Redhead
- !!!
- Nortec Collective
- Blackalicious
- Of Montreal
- The Like
- The Elected
- Oh No! Oh My!
- The Blood Arm
- Everybody Else
- Wired All Wrong
- The Foundation
- VHS or Beta
- Weird Science
- Shepard Fairey
- Travis Keller

=== October 6, 2007 ===
- **Bloc Party**
- **Justice**
- Satellite Party
- Kinky
- Comedians of Comedy
- Turbonegro
- Teddybears
- Moving Units
- The Raveonettes
- Shout Out Louds
- Autolux
- Celebrity Skin
- The Aliens
- The Aggrolites
- Busy P
- DJ Mehdi
- SebastiAn
- Kavinsky
- So Me
- Noisettes
- The Cool Kids
- The Deadly Syndrome
- Scissors for Lefty
- Johnossi
- Augie March
- Mink
- Nico Vera
- Franki Chan
- Travis Keller
- Bruce Perdew
- Le Castle Vania

=== October 4, 2008 ===
- **The Mars Volta**
- **Gogol Bordello**
- Shiny Toy Guns
- The Presets
- Cut Copy
- Matt Costa
- Black Lips
- Hercules and Love Affair
- Grand Ole Party
- Datarock
- Bitter:Sweet
- The Submarines
- Adam Freeland
- The Bloody Beetroots
- Surkin
- Para One
- Guns n Bombs
- Peanut Butter Wolf
- Buraka Som Sistema
- Nico Vega
- Japanese Motors
- The Mae Shi
- We Are Wolves
- Afternoons
- Noah and the Whale
- Mugison
- donMoy
- DJ Kid Lightning
- Paparazzi
- AC Means
- The Monolators

== Returning Artists ==
The only act from 2006's Detour Festival to return in 2007 was Travis Keller, who had DJ sets both years. Nico Vega also performed at both the 2007 and 2008 festivals.
