= Brilliant Career =

Studio album by Film School
- Released: April 2001
- Recorded: 1999–2000
- Studio: Black Eyed Pig studios in San Francisco
- Genres: Indie rock, slowcore, shoegaze
- Length: 44:55
- Label: Hauskat Records
- Producer: Film School

Film School chronology
Brilliant Career (2001)	Film School (2006)

Professional ratings
Review scores
Source	Rating
AllMusic	4/5 stars

Brilliant Career is the debut studio album by San Francisco-based indie rock band Film School, released in April 2001 via Hauskat Records.

== Track listing ==
Brilliant Career track listing
No.	Title	Length
1.	"American Turnip"	5:46
2.	"Not About a Girl"	4:19
3.	"Ume's Lament"	3:06
4.	"Tangoed Out"	1:20
5.	"Introduced"	3:15
6.	"Intentions"	4:53
7.	"Road to the Sunchairs"	2:44
8.	"Far Away"	4:44
9.	"Taste of Dust"	4:49
10.	"Tricky"	2:57
11.	"Watch You Drink"	3:01
12.	"Manville, CA"	4:01
Total length:		44:55
