= Icebird (band) =

- Origin: Los Angeles, California, U.S.
- Genres: Indie rock, punk rock, post-punk revival
- Years active: 2002 – present
- Label: Flying Squirrel Records
- Members: Barry Monahan; Kate Wise; Mike Monahan
- Website: Official website

Icebird is an American indie rock band based in Los Angeles, CA formed in 2002. The band has released one full-length album, one EP and appeared on one compilation.

== History ==
Icebird formed in 2002 with members Kate Wise and brothers Barry Monahan and Mike Monahan. They first started out in the Los Angeles' Silver Lake area.

Icebird released two albums. Magnitude, released on June 14, 2005, was a full-length album released on independent label, Flying Squirrel Records. The record was received to rave reviews by LA Alternative, Prefix Magazine, Los Angeles City Beat, Synthesis Magazine, LAist and Flavorpill. The band was variously compared to Nirvana, Sonic Youth, Dinosaur Jr, Shellac, Mudhoney, the Fall, and the Wipers. LA Alternative noted that on the album Icebird "unflinchingly pays tribute to real rock bands like Mission of Burma, the Wipers, and the Jesus Lizard without sounding retro" while TimeOut NY said "Icebird’s Magnitude (Flying Squirrel) might be the best indie-rock record we’ve heard out of LA all year."

Championship Bloodline, a five-song EP, was released by Flying Squirrel Records on January 1, 2008, and available on the iTunes Store. In July 2009, the band recorded a single called Alcohawk that appeared on the Chermak Records Compilation produced singer/guitarist Timothy James of the Movies. In addition to live performances on KXLU, the band played shows with contemporaries such Holly Golightly, French Kicks, The Movies, Devendra Banhart, Wires on Fire, Aaron North, Greenhouse Effect, LA Riots, Scissors for Lefty, Wooly Mammoth, Gliss (band), Foreign Born, Rock 'n' Roll Soldiers, EKUK, the Monolators, and Light FM.

== Band members ==
- Barry Monahan - guitar/vocals
- Mike Monahan - bass guitar/vocals
- Kate Wise - drums

== Discography ==
=== Albums ===
- Magnitude (2005, Flying Squirrel)
- Championship Bloodline EP (2008, Flying Squirrel)

=== Compilations ===
- Chermak Records Compilation (2009, Chermak Records) Icebird - Alcohawk
