= Ferraby Lionheart (EP) =

Ferraby Lionheart EP

EP by Ferraby Lionheart
- Released: 2006 (original); February 2007 (re-release)
- Recorded: December 2005–February 2006
- Genres: Folk, indie
- Length: 20:43
- Labels: Lights and Buttons; Nettwerk
- Producer: Ferraby Lionheart

Ferraby Lionheart chronology
Ferraby Lionheart EP (2006)	Catch the Brass Ring (2007)

Ferraby Lionheart is the self-titled, self-released debut EP from singer-songwriter Ferraby Lionheart. Ferraby recorded the EP over the course of a few months while still with his then-current band Telecast. He recorded the songs entirely in his "one-room apartment in a two-story building from the 1930s" in Los Angeles, California. The EP was re-released digitally after Ferraby signed a contract with Nettwerk Records.

A music video was produced for the song "A Crack in Time." link

Jason Stare played drums on "The Fighter", "A Crack in Time", "The Ballad of Gus and Sam"

== Track listing ==
1. "Tickets to Crickets" - 3:08
2. "Won't Be Long" - 3:26
3. "The Fighter" - 3:53
4. "A Crack in Time" - 3:01
5. "The Ballad of Gus and Sam" - 3:31
6. "Something to Love" - 3:47
