= Jody Glenham =

Canadian musician

- Origin: Vancouver, British Columbia, Canada
- Genres: shoegaze, pop-rock, moody, indie folk
- Labels: Independent
- Website: www.jodyglenham.com

Jody Glenham is a Canadian musician based in Vancouver, British Columbia. Jody is often joined by her six-piece backing band, The Dreamers.

== History ==
In 2013, Glenham left her home in Vancouver, BC for California to work with producer Raymond Richards at his studio, Red Rockets Glare in Rancho Park. The 'Dreamer EP' was independently released on February 18, 2014 and featured five songs from these sessions with 'Between You And Me' as the lead single.

A music video for the song 'Quick American', off the 'Dreamer' EP was filmed by Vancouver-based photographer/videographer Megan-Magdalena and starred Vancouver-based model, Cate Dunk from Detention Agency.

In July 2015, Glenham and her band, known collectively as Jody Glenham and The Dreamers, released the record, 'For Frances' via indie, Vancouver-based label, Kingfisher Bluez.

Glenham also plays with indie-rock, singer-songwriter, Louise Burns of Light Organ Records, is a part of Vancouver indie-pop super group Medium Cool, and at one time blew minds and broke hearts in fuzz-pop darlings Pleasure Cruise.
