= Film School (album) =

Studio album by Film School
- Released: January 24, 2006
- Recorded: Center of the Mile; Coast, both in San Francisco
- Genre: Post-punk, shoegaze
- Length: 51:18
- Label: Beggars Banquet
- Producer: Film School, Donny Newenhouse, Lars Savage, Thom Canova

Film School chronology
Brilliant Career (2001)	Film School (2006)	Hideout (2007)

Professional ratings
Review scores
Source	Rating
AllMusic	4/5 stars
Spin	(favorable)
Manchestermusic.co.uk	(extremely favorable)

Film School is the second album by San Francisco-based indie rock band Film School, released in 2006. In the UK, the album came with the bonus track "P.S." (which first appeared on the band's Alwaysnever EP in 2003). In the liner notes for the album, lead singer Greg Bertens is listed as 'Krayg Burton.'

== Track listing ==
1. "(Untitled)" – 1:07
2. "On & On" – 5:39
3. "Harmed" – 3:17
4. "Pitfalls" – 5:01
5. "Breet" – 4:24
6. "He's a DeepDeep ^{[sic]} Lake" – 5:02
7. "Garrison" – 2:16
8. "11:11" – 6:48
9. "Sick of the Shame" – 6:34
10. "Like You Know" – 5:55
11. "P.S." – 5:15 (UK bonus track)

== Singles ==
- "On & On" (November 7, 2005)
  1. "On & On" - 5:42
  2. "Plus One" - 4:45
  3. "February" - 4:00
- "11:11" (May 1, 2006)
  1. "11:11" (Edit) - 4:51
  2. "Walk Until Sunday" - 5:31
