= Lycée Français de Los Angeles =

Le Lycée français de Los Angeles
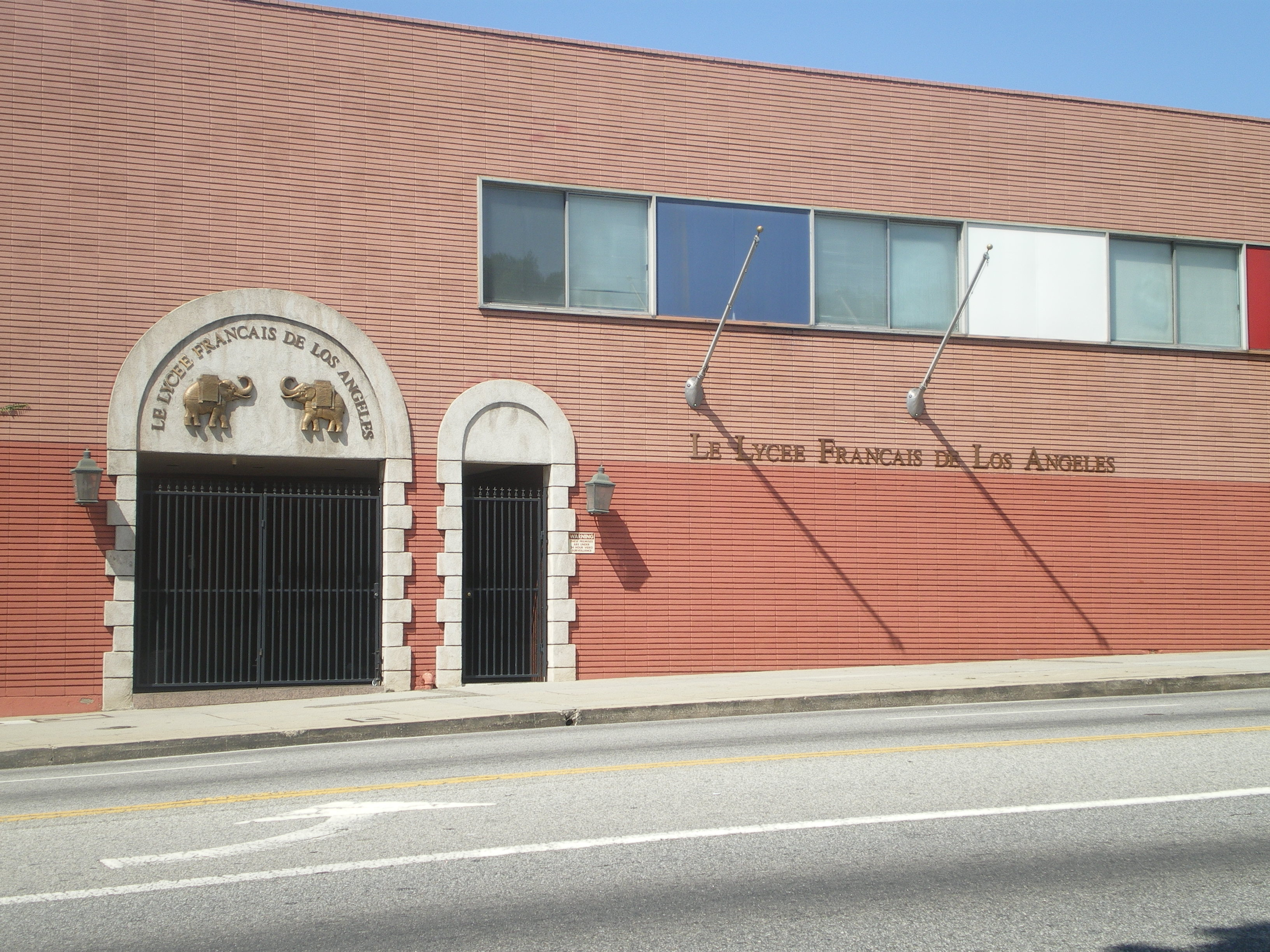
- Century City campus on Pico Blvd.

Location
- 3261 Overland Avenue; Los Angeles, California; United States; 34°01′40″N 118°24′57″W

Information
- Type: Private, coeducational
- Motto: Cogito ergo sum
- Established: 1964
- Founder: Esther and Raymond Kabbaz
- President: Clara-Lisa Kabbaz
- Grades: Junior Preschool through Grade 12
- Accreditation: Western Association of Schools and Colleges
- Website: www.lyceela.org

Le Lycée français de Los Angeles (French School of Los Angeles) is a private bilingual education school located in the Westside Village neighborhood of Los Angeles, California. The school was founded in 1964.

== School ==
As of March 2026, the school had more than 675 students, about 30%–40% of them being French citizens and the remainder Americans or incoming students from over 54 nations. No prior knowledge of French is required to enroll at any grade. The school is accredited by the French Ministry of Education and WASC, and confers the U.S. High School Diploma, AP Capstone, as well as the French Baccalauréat.

It is composed of the following campuses:

- Campus 55 (Jr Preschool, Preschool)
- Century City Campus (K1, K2, and 1st Grade)
- Main Campus (Grade 2 through 8)
- The Raymond & Esther Kabbaz High School (Grade 9 through 12)
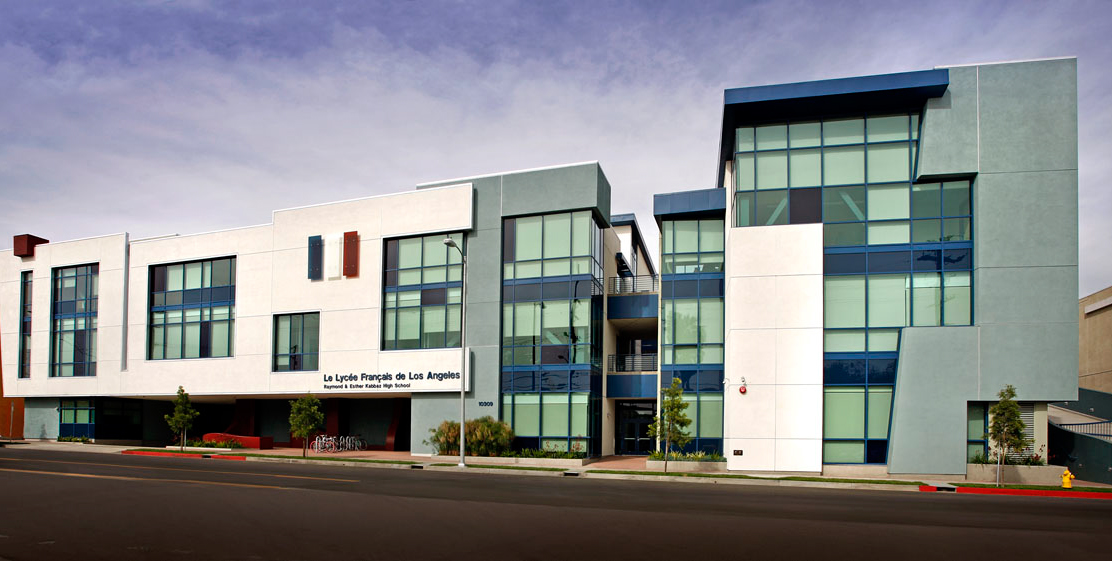
The Raymond & Esther Kabbaz High School

=== Former campuses ===
In 1980, the Lycee bought the 6.2-acre (2.5 ha) former Parkway School property, located in the Hollywood Riviera section of Torrance, from the Torrance Unified School District. This property became the Lycee's Torrance campus, and as of February 1990 the campus had 100 students. In November 1989, the Lycee sold the property.

Lycée français de Los Angeles operated a San Fernando Valley campus in Woodland Hills, on the site of Platt Elementary School. The Pacific Palisades campus on Marquez Avenue was destroyed during the Palisades fire in January 2025.

== Notable alumni ==
- Leslie Bega, actress
- Mika Boorem, actress
- Christie Brinkley, model
- Shannen Doherty, actress
- Jodie Foster, actress
- Noah Hathaway, actor
- Claire Danes, actress
- Tania Raymonde, actress
- Kelli Williams, actress
- Molly Ringwald, actress
- Michael Vartan, actor
- Tracy Reiner, actress
Campuses

== See also ==
- Agency for French Education Abroad
- American School of Paris - An American international school in France
