= Grooves (magazine) =

American electronic music magazine

- Grooves logo (2005-current)
- Editor: Sean Portnoy
- Categories: Electronic music
- Frequency: Quarterly
- Circulation: 10,000
- Publisher: Sean Portnoy
- Founded: 1999
- Final issue Number: December 2005 #18
- Country: United States
- Based in: San Francisco
- Language: English
- Website: www.groovesmag.com
- ISSN: 1555-3264

Grooves is an American electronic music magazine founded in 1999 by editor Sean Portnoy, initially concentrating on the then-burgeoning IDM music genre and expanding to its more experimental, abstract offshoots, such as microsound, microhouse and glitch, eventually encompassing a global view of musicians and cross-cultural influences that is reflected in coverage of jungle, two-step, avant rap, broken beat and other offbeat new music. The headquarters is in San Francisco.

Early issues contained a vast range of full-length album and 12" single/EP reviews; later issues added new media release types, including reviews of books and DVD-based documentary and music video film releases. Additionally, each issue contained several artist interviews and label profiles, evaluations of new and offbeat digital and analog hardware and software tools for making electronic music, and coverage of live performances and festivals throughout the United States, Canada, South America and Europe.

== Catalog ==
The first eighteen issues were printed and distributed worldwide through record stores and by subscription quarterly. In December 2005, after 18 issues, the magazine switched to an exclusively online format. The first two digital issues, were made available through a web-based interface provided by Texterity. Podcasts and forums were added in mid-2006. Since then, features and review articles have been made available directly through the main site.
