= The Fling (band) =

American indie band

- Origin: Long Beach, California
- Genres: Indie rock, folk rock, psychedelic pop
- Years active: 2007–present
- Labels: Dangerbird, Lady Monk
- Members: Dustin Lovelis; Graham Lovelis; Justin Roeland; Justin Ivey
- Website: www.theflingband.com

The Fling is a band from Long Beach, CA consisting of Dustin Lovelis (guitars, vocals), Graham Lovelis (bass, vocals), Justin Roeland (guitars, keys, vocals), Joel Bond (guitars, keys, vocals) and Justin Ivey (drums). The band is known for alternating lead singer duties. Their sound has been described as "classic '60s pop, '90s alternative, and contemporary indie-rock clashing fluidly to create a strangely nostalgic effect." The band self-released their debut album, "When The Madhouses Appear," on Lady Monk Records (the band's own imprint), in late 2010, after which they toured alongside Delta Spirit and Darker My Love. The critically lauded self-released album earned them a deal with Dangerbird Records, who re-released the album in early 2011, as well as sessions on World Cafe and with KCRW's Nic Harcourt. A 7-song EP "What I've Seen," was released in November 2011 and followed by a ten-week national tour. The band is currently working on its second full-length record and taking the process into their own hands and raising money directly through fans without the influence of a label.

The song "Out of My Head", from the album "When the Madhouses Appear," (2010) was featured in the end credits of the American comedy-drama series Orange is the New Black, in the 4th episode of the 4th season, titled "Doctor Psycho".

== Discography ==
- Ghost Dance (EP) (2008)
- "Out of My Head/Wanderingfoot" (7") (2009)
- When The Madhouses Appear (2011)
- What I've Seen (EP) (2011)
- Mean Something (2013)
