= The Lonely Wild =

American indie folk band

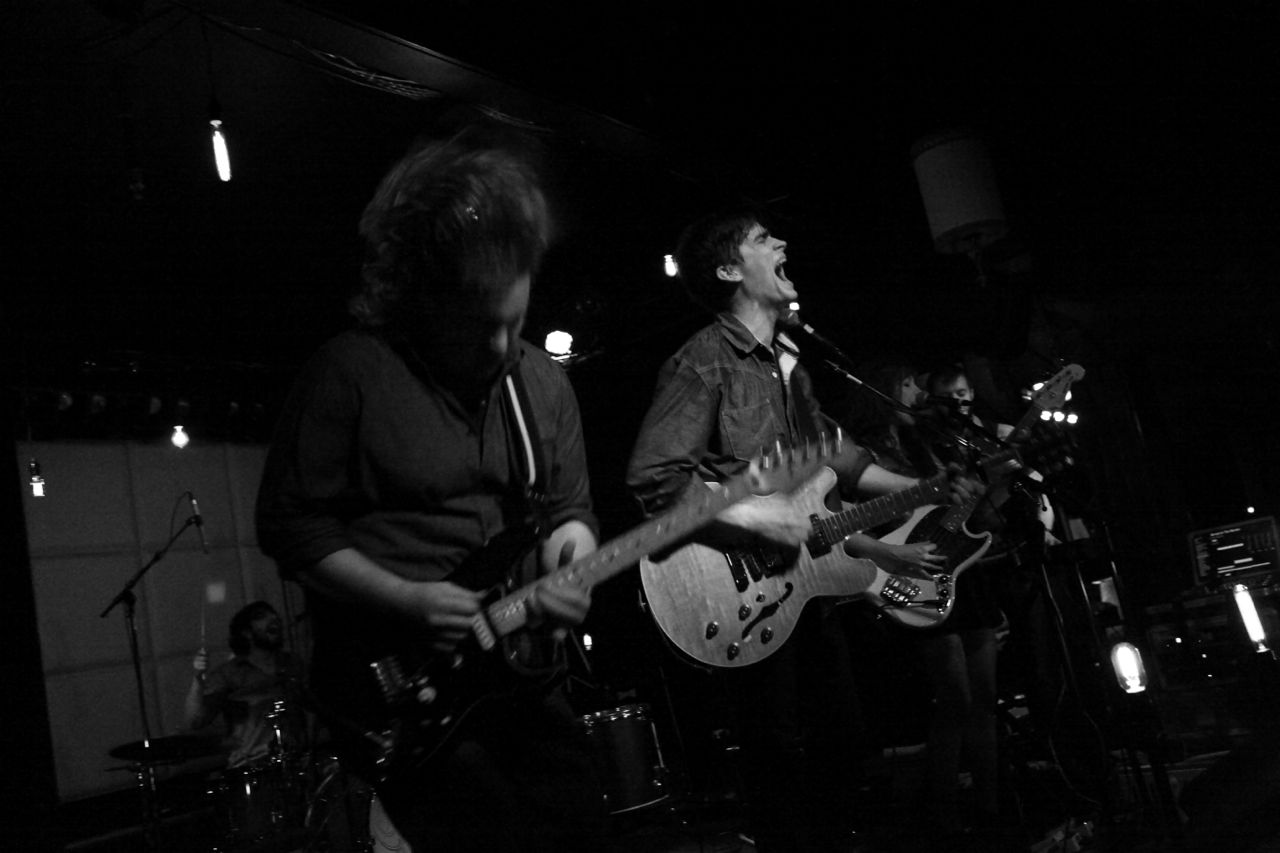
- From left to right: Dave Farina, Andrew Schneider, Andrew Carroll, Jessi Williams and Ryan Ross performing at The Echo in Los Angeles, California. Credit: Jeff Fasano

Background information
- Origin: Los Angeles, California
- Genres: Indie rock, indie folk
- Years active: 2010 – present
- Members: Andrew Carroll; Ryan Ross; Andrew Schneider; Jessi Williams; Dave Farina
- Past members: Jennifer Talesfore; Edward Cerecedes
- Website: http://thelonelywild.com

The Lonely Wild is an American indie folk band based in Los Angeles, California. The group's debut album, The Sun As It Comes, was released on April 2, 2013, via their own Ursa Major Recordings with distribution and marketing by Thirty Tigers/RED Distribution. On October 2, 2015, the band released their second album Chasing White Light on Fast Plastic/ eOne Music.

== History ==
The Lonely Wild was formed in 2010 by Andrew Carroll. As a Sonoma, California, native, he moved to Los Angeles to study writing, music and film. Carroll and multi-instrumentalist, Ryan Ross met in school and performed together previously in their band You Me & Iowa. Andrew Schneider, a Missouri native and Carroll's classmate in classical guitar, joined soon after moving back from a short stint teaching and performing in New York City. The trio along with vocalist Jennifer Talesfore and drummer Edward Cerecedes recorded their debut EP, Dead End, which was released in early 2011. Supporting this release, the band (after the addition of Jessi Williams and Dave Farina to the band) opened for national acts such as John Doe, Damien Rice, The Elected, Laura Marling, and Lord Huron.

In early 2012, the band holed up in The Hangar in Sacramento for a week-long recording session which would ultimately become The Sun As It Comes. Prior to this new material came the departure of Talesfore, and the introduction of Indiana born vocalist/multi-instrumentalist Jessi Williams. She was spotted while performing with her previous band, Coyote, and was asked to sit in during a few performances. Williams officially joined band after accompanying them on a three-week tour across the United States, including performances at 2012's South by Southwest. Shortly after this recording session and tour, Cerecedes exited the group and drummer Dave Farina officially joined the group, cementing its current incarnation.

The Lonely Wild released The Sun As It Comes on April 2, 2013, via their own Ursa Major Recordings to generally positive reviews. Consequence of Sound called the album "a masterpiece of harmonious country rock" and American Songwriter gave the album an honorable mention on their Best of 2013 list. The band supported this album by opening for acts such as Phosphorescent and Moon Taxi, as well as embarking on a national co-headlining tour with The Apache Relay. The band followed up their debut with their anti-Christmas song "Holidays", which they debuted on Consequence of Sound.

In late 2014, the band joined producer John Vanderslice in his Tiny Telephone Studios to record their second album, Chasing White Light. The album was released on October 2, 2015, via Fast Plastic/eOne Music.

== Members ==
Current

- Andrew Carroll – vocals, guitar, bass (2010–present)
- Ryan Ross – vocals, bass, keyboards vocals, trumpet (2010–present)
- Andrew Schneider – guitar, bass (2010–present)
- Jessi Williams – vocals, trumpet (2012–present)
- Dave Farina – drums, percussion (2012–present)

Former

- Jennifer Talesfore – vocals (2011–2012)
- Edward Cerecedes – drums, percussion (2011–2012)

== Discography ==
Studio album

- The Sun as it Comes (2013)
- Chasing White Light (2015)

EPs

- Dead End EP (2011)
- Buried in the Murder (2012)
