= Rancho Park, Los Angeles =

Rancho Park
- Neighborhood of Los Angeles
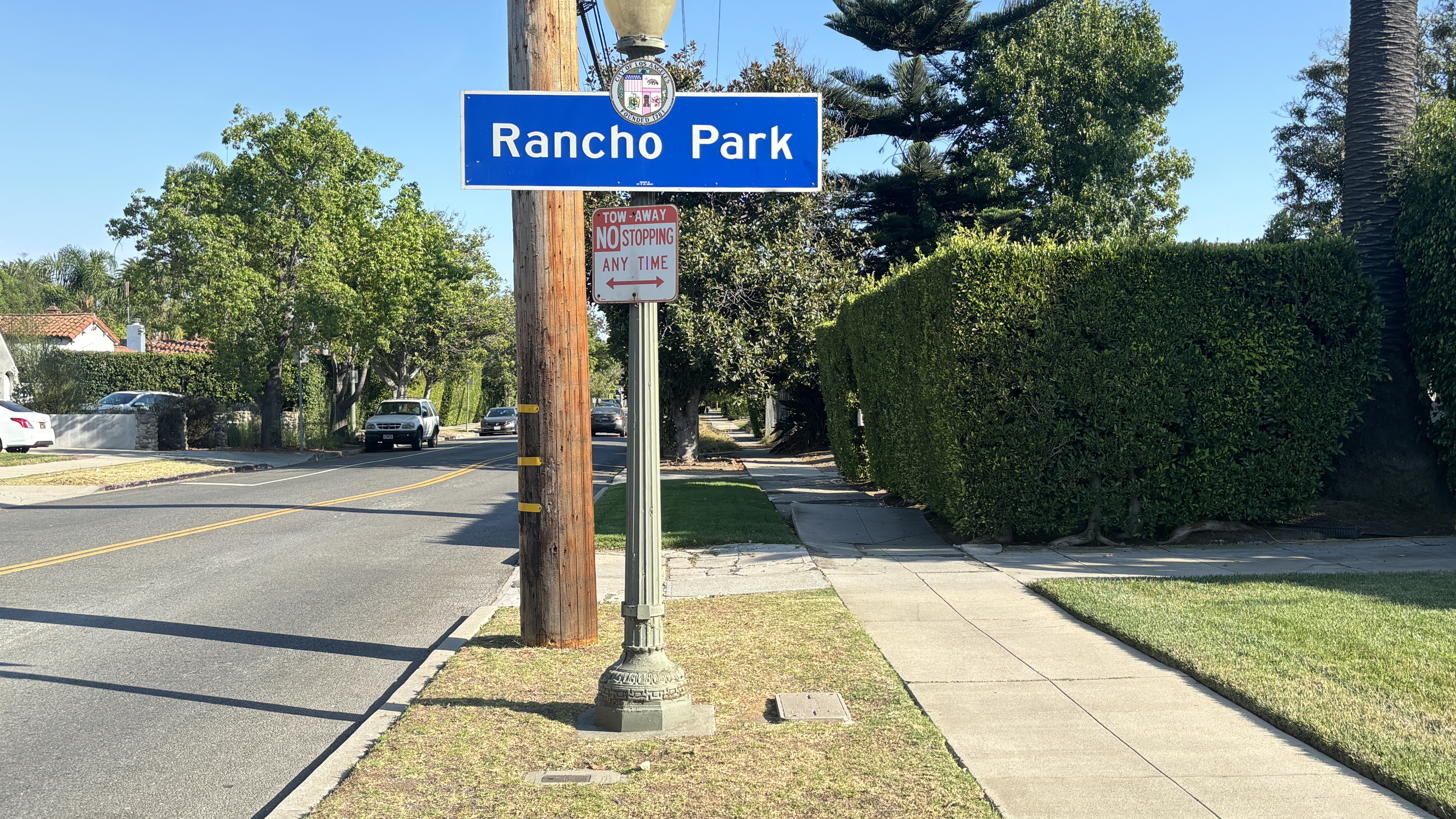
- Rancho Park Neighborhood Sign

- Location within Western Los Angeles
- Coordinates: 34°02′30″N 118°25′29″W
- Country: United States
- State: California
- County: Los Angeles
- City: Los Angeles

Rancho Park is a residential neighborhood in the Westside of the city of Los Angeles, California with mostly single-family homes and tree-lined streets. The community is nestled between West Los Angeles and Cheviot Hills. This enclave draws young professionals and families and is home to residents working in a variety of professional occupations. History proves the neighborhood was once a part of Westwood until Olympic Blvd. was placed dividing the area North and South. The Southern section, now known as Rancho Park, felt cut off from its North side lobbying for its own identity in the 1930s.

== Etymology ==
Rancho Park was named by area boosters after World War II.

We thought it was about time to have our own community. We must separate ourselves from Westwood. There were many names suggested for our new community but there was a pioneer real estate broker here who had established his office on Pico near Manning back in 1927. His name was Bill Heyler. Bill did as much as any other one person to develop the area; so when it came time to adopting a name for the community, the wisdom of our pioneer was in counsel. The honor of naming this community "Rancho Park" went to Bill Heyler. Heyler is also credited with bringing in the Rancho Park Golf Course, which opened in 1947.

== Geography ==
It is bordered by Sawtelle on the west, West Los Angeles on the northwest, Cheviot Hills on the east, and Westside Village on the south. The district's boundaries, while somewhat ill-defined, are generally considered to be the San Diego Freeway (I-405) or Sepulveda on the west, Olympic Boulevard on the north, Manning Avenue (south of Pico Boulevard) and Beverly Glen Boulevard (north of Pico) on the east, and National Boulevard on the south. (Los Angeles City signs mark Olympic Boulevard as the district's northern boundary.) Major thoroughfares include Pico, Westwood, Olympic, Sepulveda, and Beverly Glen Boulevards, along with Overland and Manning Avenues. Nearby is Santa Monica Boulevard. Century City is also located nearby.

== History ==
Rancho Park was developed in the 1920s as a middle-class area, and most of its housing stock consists of Spanish Colonial bungalows and ranch houses. Today, many of the modest sized homes have been rehabbed into larger and more modern architecture. Apart from the heavily traveled stretch of Pico Boulevard (including the Westside Pavilion shopping mall) in its central portions, the district has a notably quiet, suburban feel. The district's streets are equipped with faux 19th-century streetlights and feature large deciduous trees in the strips between the sidewalk and the street. (Rancho Park is one of the few districts in Los Angeles where fall foliage can be seen.) The enclave is centrally located to other Westside communities.

== Demographics ==
In 2009, the Los Angeles Times's "Mapping L.A." project supplied these Rancho Park neighborhood statistics: population: 5,464; median household income: $78,116.

== Government ==
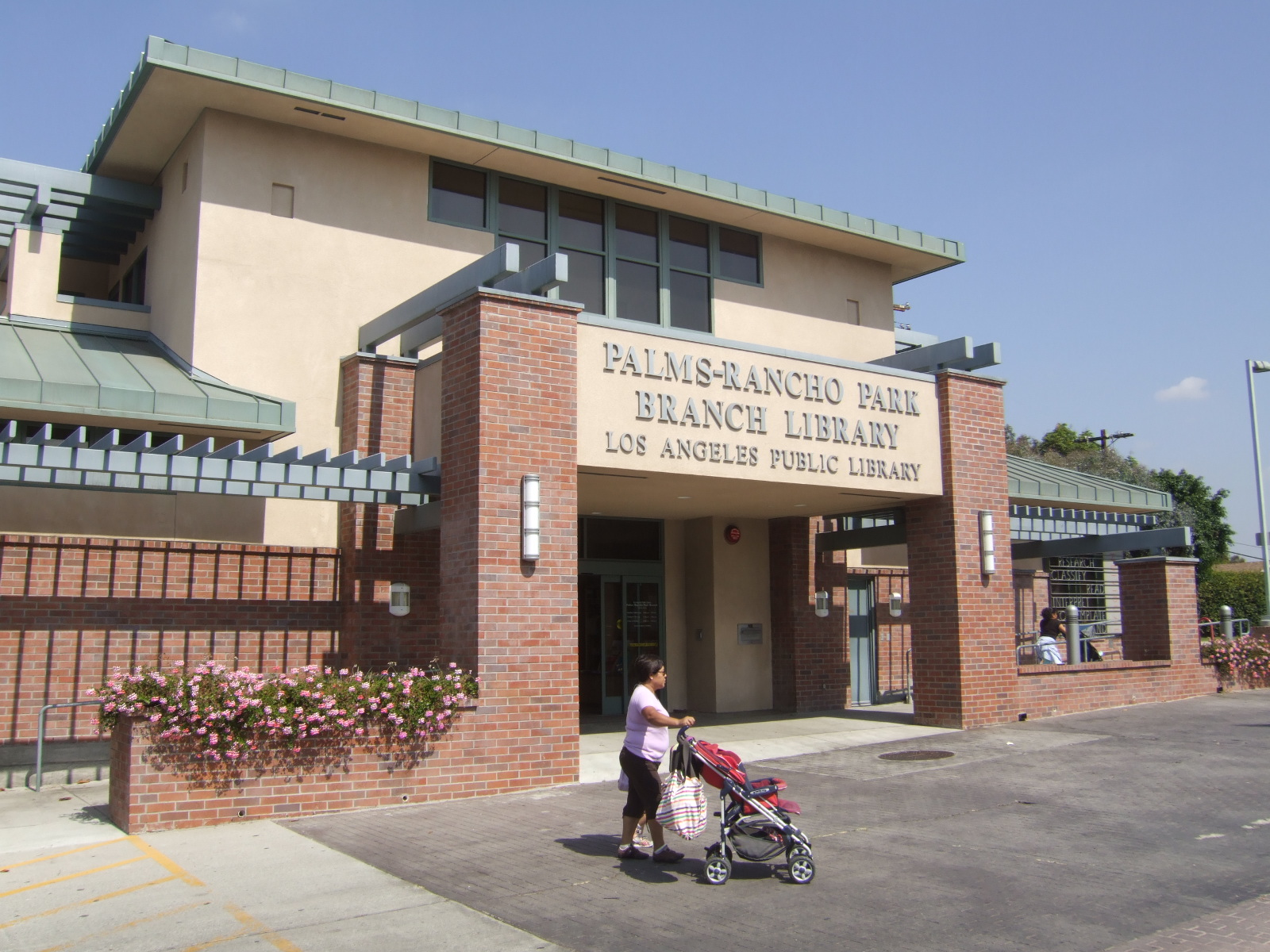
Palms–Rancho Park branch library in Los Angeles (California) Public Library system

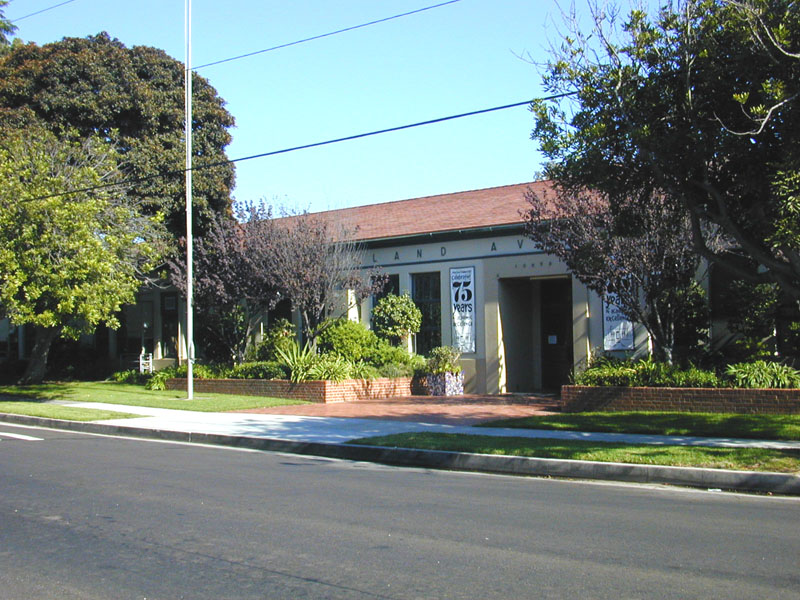
Overland Avenue Elementary

The Los Angeles County Department of Health Services SPA 5 West Area Health Office serves Rancho Park. Los Angeles Police Department operates the West Los Angeles Community Police Station serving the neighborhood.

== Education ==
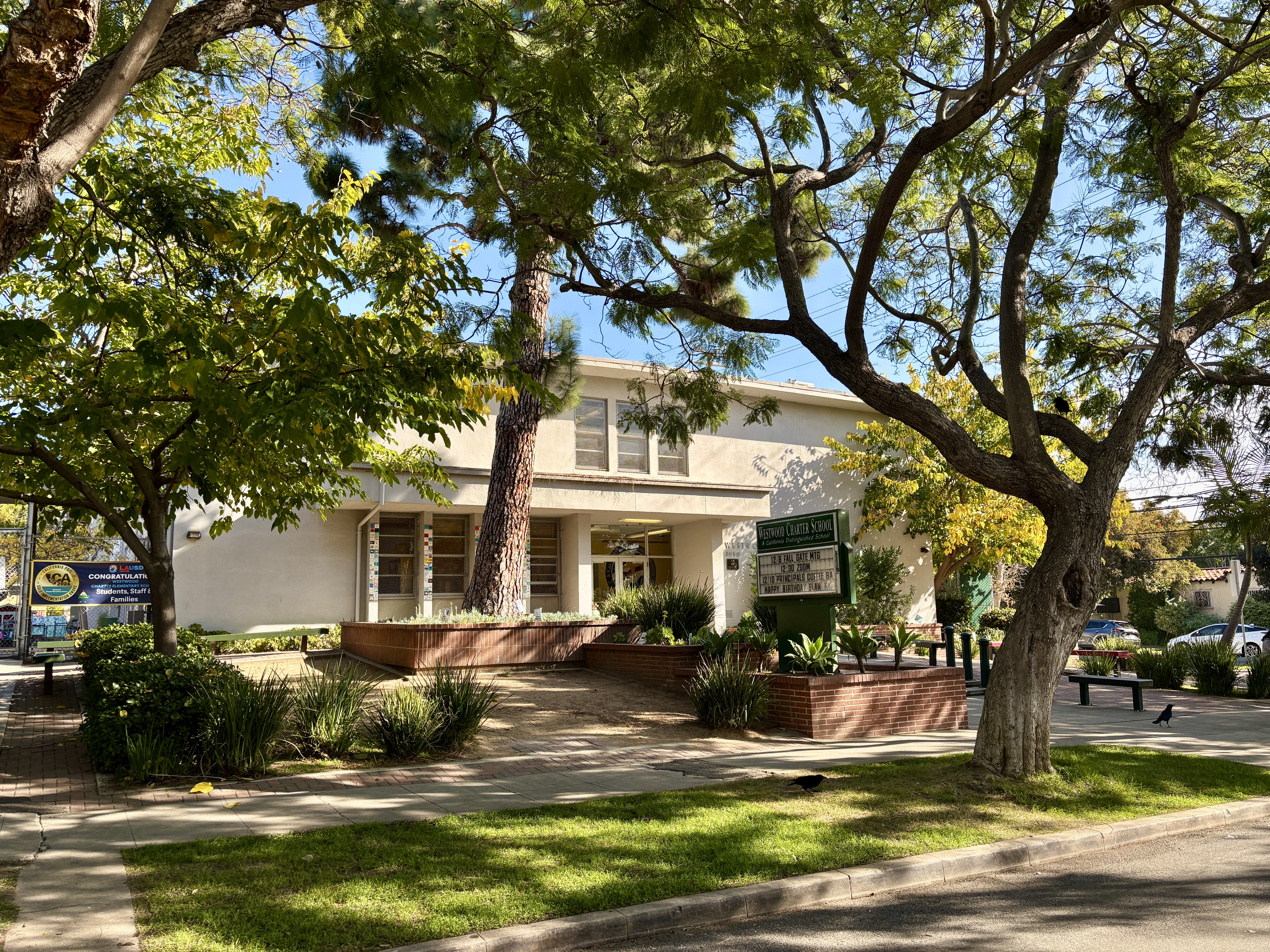
Westwood Elementary School

Rancho Park is served by LAUSD schools:

- Westwood Charter Elementary School
- Overland Elementary School
- Clover Elementary School
- Emerson Middle School
- Venice High School
- Hamilton High School

Private school:

- Notre Dame Academy (Catholic girls high school)
- Lycee Francais de Los Angeles (private, bilingual and international institution)
- St Timothy School (Catholic school)
- Redeemer Baptist Elementary School

Charter school:

- New West Charter Middle School

Los Angeles Public Library operates the Palms–Rancho Park Branch.

== Recreation ==
The municipal Rancho Park Golf Course includes an 18-hole layout par 71 championship course. The park has Back Nine Play, a banquet room, a cart rental, a clubhouse, a lighted driving range, lessons, locker rooms for men and women, practice putting greens, a pro shop, rental clubs, and a snack bar. Two people have tied the course record of 61 (–10) at the par-71 course. The junior record is 64 (–7) by Tiger Woods in 1989, at the age of 13. The senior record is held by James White, who shot a 65 (–6) in the Los Angeles Senior City Championship in August 1998.

== In popular culture ==
- Pico and Sepulveda is a song by Felix Figueroa & His Orchestra (stage name for Freddy Martin's band).
