= The Monolators =

American rock band

- Origin: Los Angeles, California, U.S.
- Genres: Indie rock, garage rock, post-punk revival
- Years active: 2002 – present
- Label: Monolator Music
- Members: Eli Chartkoff; Mary Chartkoff; Ashley Jex; Ray Gurrola; Jillinda Palmer
- Past members: Michael Dennis; Andy Bollas; Tom Bogdon
- Website: Official website

The Monolators are an American rock band from Los Angeles composed of Eli Chartkoff (vocals, guitar), Mary Chartkoff (drums), Ashley Jex (bass), Ray Gurrola (lead guitar), and Jillinda Palmer (keyboards).

== History ==
Originally called Lonely 451, the band formed as a trio in January 2000 with Eli Chartkoff on bass/guitar/vocals, Mary Chartkoff on drums and Mike Dennis on bass/guitar/vocals. This configuration lasted only 9 months and played a single show: a house party in Mary Chartkoff's living room. The band reformed as The Monolators in the summer of 2002 with Eli Chartkoff on bass/vocals, Mary Chartkoff on drums, and Mike Dennis on lead guitar. Soon after, The Monolators began taking the project more seriously and recorded the EP Hi-Fi Sound in their garage, followed by their first live show at Silverlake restaurant Zen Sushi in September 2002. In 2003, the band self-released a holiday-themed 7" vinyl single Santa Claus vs. Dave Matthews, followed by the full-length record Rejection Set Me Free in 2004. In 2005, Mike Dennis left the band but they continued as a duo with Eli on guitar. The band recorded their second album Our Tears Have Wings in the Fall of 2005 at producer Raymond Richards's Red Rockets Glare Studios with future member Tom Bogdon as a studio musician on lead guitar. They began a monthly "First Friday" residency at the Los Angeles club Mr. T's Bowl in June 2006, which ended exactly two years later in June 2008. The band became a trio again in 2006 with the addition of Andy Bollas on bass. After releasing the You Look Good on the Train EP in 2007, the band (following the departure of Bollas and with new members Ashley Jex on bass and Tom Bogdon on guitar) released their third record Don't Dance in 2008. In October 2008, the band won the LA Weekly Detour Music Festival Battle of the Bands contest sharing the stage with Gogol Bordello, Black Lips, and Datarock. In November 2008, the band contributed their song "Hot Sleigh" to the benefit holiday compilation "Plastic Snow" featuring Los Angeles bands Great Northern, Earlimart, and others. In 2009, the band changed their lineup again with the departure of Tom Bogdon and the additions of Ray Gurrola on lead guitar and Jillinda Palmer on keyboards, followed by the digital EP release of Ruby, I'm Changing My Number in Spring 2009. On September 11, 2024, it was announced that Andy Bollas would rejoin The Monolators on bass for a show on Saturday September 14, 2024 at the Goldfish on York in Highland Park, Los Angeles. Don't be a total squid, come see them rip!

== Discography ==
=== Albums/EPs/Singles ===
- Hi-Fi Sound EP (2002 US)
- Santa Claus vs. Dave Matthews 7" single (2003 US)
- Radio's On/Take It Outside cd-single (2004 US)
- Rejection Set Me Free (album) (2004 US)
- Let's Be Best Friends In Space 7" single (2005 US)
- Our Tears Have Wings (album) (2006 US)
- You Look Good on the Train 10" EP (2007 US)
- Don't Dance (album) (2008 US)
- Ruby, I'm Changing My Number EP (2009 US)
- We All Fell Dead 12" single (2009 US)

=== Compilations ===
- Plastic Snow holiday compilation ("Hot Sleigh") (2008 US)

=== Music Videos ===
- "Take It Outside" (2004, Directed by Cody Cameron)
- "We Fell Dead" (2006, Directed by Locke Webster)
- "Strawberry Roan" (2007, Directed by John Duarte)
