= Dan Long (producer) =

Dan Long is an American music producer, recording engineer, and mixer. He owns Headwest Studio, also known as Exactamundo. With Alex Lipsen and Scott Norton, he founded Headgear Studio in Williamsburg, Brooklyn, where artists such as the Yeah Yeah Yeahs, TV on the Radio, David Bowie, Son Volt, and The All-American Rejects have recorded.

== Early life ==
Long was born in Washington, D.C., attended Georgetown Preparatory School, and graduated from the University of Virginia with a major in international relations and a minor in German. After moving to New York City in 1996, he got his start recording music by making four-track recordings of friends' bands. He then began working as an assistant engineer at Coyote Studio in Brooklyn and attended the Institute of Audio Research. He started Headgear Studio in 1998 and moved it into its current location in 2000. The studio quickly became an epicenter of the burgeoning Williamsburg music scene, especially after the band Yeah Yeah Yeahs chose it as the site to record their Grammy-nominated debut album Fever to Tell.

== Career ==
Long relocated to Los Angeles in 2006. He has worked with bands and artists including Local Natives, Spiral Stairs of the band Pavement, Pela (now We Are Augustines), Apex Manor, The Jealous Girlfriends, Muggabears (now Grooms), The Naked Hearts, Kevin Devine, Ferraby Lionheart, Correa town, Film School, The Henry Clay People, The Sweet Hurt, Frankel, The Deadly Syndrome, Ports, Simone White, The Idaho Falls, The Lonely Wild, and Red Cortez. He has performed as a guitarist and bassist with Spiral Stairs, Devolver, Say Hi, The Jealous Girlfriends, The Henry Clay People, and Angela Correa of Correatown. In 2007–2008, Long worked with the film score composer Michael Andrews on the score for Walk Hard and on Inara George and Van Dyke Parks's album An Invitation. His music has been featured on television programs including Grey's Anatomy, The Big C, Shameless, Wilfred, and Switched at Birth, and he co-wrote the theme song for God, Guns & Automobiles (History Channel). He also contributed music to the film trailers for The Guilt Trip and The Interview.
