= Westside Village, Los Angeles =

Westside Village
- Neighborhood of Los Angeles
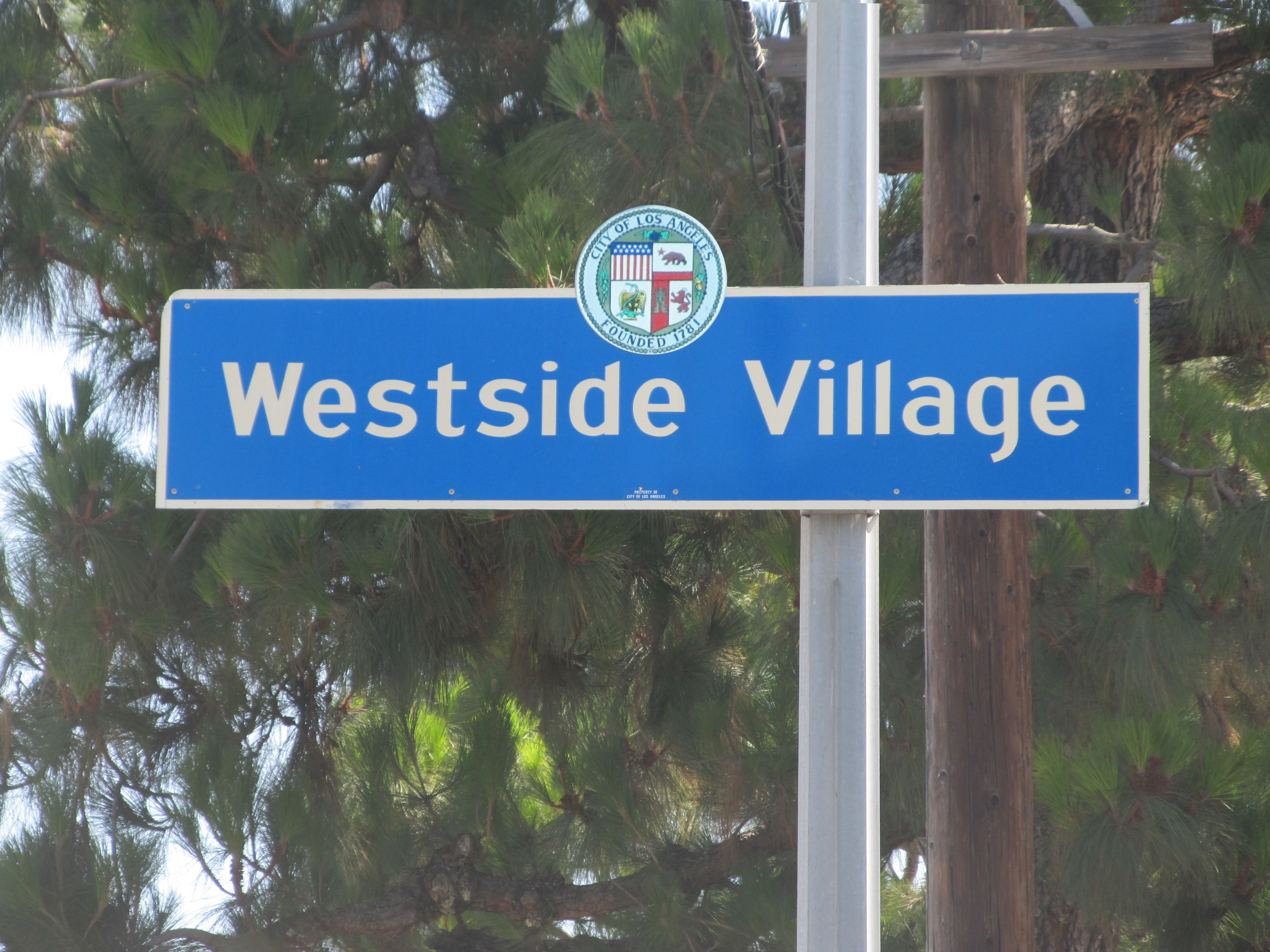
- Westside Village neighborhood sign located at the southeast corner of National Boulevard and Sepulveda Boulevard

- Location within Western Los Angeles
- Coordinates: 34.024227°N 118.418241°W
- Country: United States
- State: California
- County: County of Los Angeles
- City: City of Los Angeles

Population (2010)
  - Total: 9,984
- ZIP Code: 90034
- Area code: 310

Westside Village is a neighborhood on the west side of Los Angeles, California.

== Geography ==
Westside Village is bounded by National Boulevard to the north, Charnock Road to the south, Overland Avenue to the east and Sepulveda Boulevard to the west. The neighborhood shares a 90034 zip code with Palms, but Westside Village is designated "Zone 1" of the Mar Vista Community Council.

== History ==
The area was part of Rancho La Ballona and later the Charnock Ranch (which grew lima beans, grain hay and walnuts). Then, in 1939, the area was subdivided for the building of 1,200 single family homes by developer Fritz B. Burns, and it became one of the first examples of tract housing in the Los Angeles area. Fritz Burns was also responsible for the development of the westside neighborhoods of Playa del Rey and Westchester, and his personal papers are archived at the Westchester campus of Loyola Marymount University.

Westside Village was a created with affordability in mind. The houses averaged just 900 square feet (84 m^{2}), had single car garages, and were built on lots of about 50 by 135 feet (15 by 41 m). In 1939–1940, the original homes sold for around US$4,000. Burns kept the prices affordable by selling the houses unpainted, the yards unplanted (while providing buyers with access to plants that could be purchased for 25 and 50 cents each) and by leaving the streets without sidewalks—many of which remain without sidewalks to this day. The placement of Westside Village between what was then the MGM Studios in Culver City and the Douglas Aircraft Company in Santa Monica at a time when both the movie and aerospace industries were booming, made the homes in the development immediately desirable to workers of both facilities.

== Foliage ==
The streets are lined with mature, statuesque Jacaranda, Pine, Camphor, Chinese Elm, and Eucalyptus trees, which provide privacy and shade for the residents.

== Population ==
As of the 2010 U.S. Census, Westside Village had a population of about 9,984.
