= Ferraby Lionheart =

American musician

- Born: Ferraby Chase Lizarraga; May 1, 1977 (age 49); Los Angeles, California, U.S.
- Genres: Folk, pop, rock, Americana, film score
- Occupations: Musician, composer, record producer
- Years active: 2006–present
- Labels: Nettwerk Records, Lights & Buttons, Thirty Tigers
- Website: http://www.ferrabylionheart.com

Ferraby Lionheart (born May 1, 1977 in Los Angeles, California, United States) is an American songwriter and recording artist.

== History ==
Lionheart's family moved from Los Angeles to Nashville when he was three years old. He remained there until after high school, when he left to attend The School of the Art Institute of Chicago. After three semesters, he dropped out to pursue music making. He explored songwriting in these early days with an eight track recording device. In 2000, Ferraby returned to Los Angeles and began hanging around Hollywood open mics and rock clubs. His first band, Telecast, became popular in Los Angeles with the new wave rock resurgent fans of the time. By 2006, Lionheart had gone solo and self-released a six-song EP "Ferraby Lionheart EP", which would later be distributed by Nettwerk Records.

On September 4, 2007, Lionheart's debut album Catch the Brass Ring (Nettwerk) was released, followed by several US tours in support of the album and a performance on the Late Late Show with Craig Ferguson. In 2008, he scored and wrote songs for the John Stockwell film Middle of Nowhere, as well as The Rocker, starring Rainn Wilson. Ferraby toured Sweden and the UK before returning to Nashville for the recording of his second LP, The Jack of Hearts, released in August 2010.

Lionheart has started multiple side projects as a writer, including Oxford, The Left Hands and Corvet, whose songs have been heavily licensed in the realm of film and television.

There has been talk of a third LP and unreleased tracks floating around but no confirmed news.

== Personal life ==
Ferraby was born second of three children to Maxcia and Luis Lizarraga. His father came from a Mexican restaurant family in Los Angeles. His mother's mother Marcia Day was a music manager, responsible for 1970's duo Seals & Crofts. Ferraby grew close to his grandmother as a teen growing up in Nashville, TN. He spent a summer living in her basement recording his first songs. "My grandmother lived an extraordinary life; raising five daughters alone in Hollywood, gambling in Las Vegas to pay the rent, discovering and breaking Seals & Crofts and finding the spirituality of the Baháʼí Faith. Lionheart grew up Baháʼí, both his parents having converted from Catholicism as teens in the 1960s. He embraces the Baháʼí teachings of a New World Order. "It's painfully obvious how humanity's only salvation is through a spiritual discovery, a transformation of hearts, a new consciousness, a re-structuring of government. Someday a world community will prevail."

Lionheart has homes in Nashville and Los Angeles.

He has a daughter (Willa Jean Batson) born February 19, 2013, from ex, Dawn Batson.

== Discography ==
- Ferraby Lionheart EP (2006)
- Catch the Brass Ring (September 4, 2007)
- The Jack of Hearts (2010)
