= Kelcey Ayer =

American musician

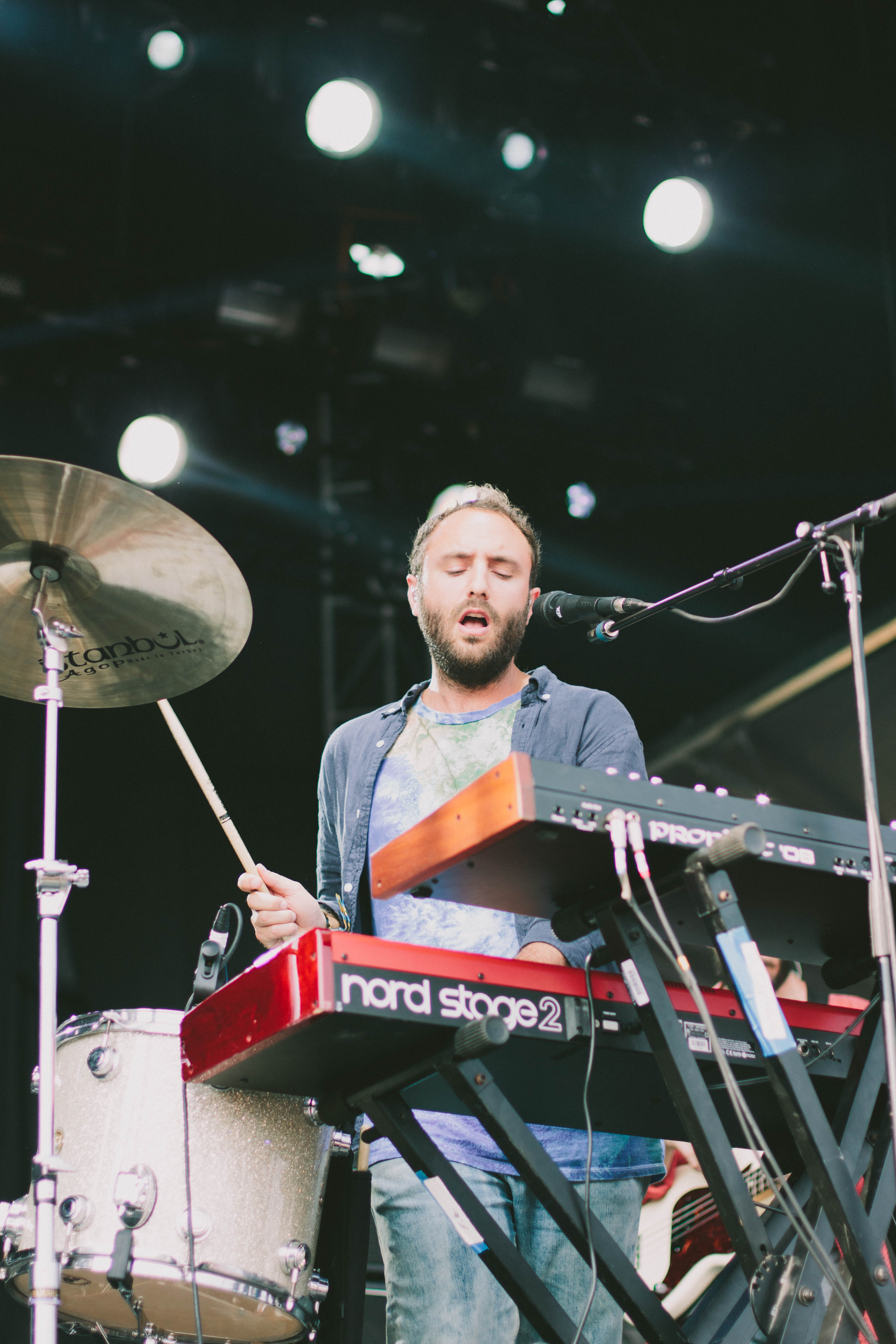
- Ayer in 2013

Background information
- Born: Kelcey Paul Ayer
- Origin: Orange County, California, U.S.
- Genre: Indie rock
- Years active: 2005–present
- Labels: No Label, formerly Frenchkiss Records, Loma Vista
- Formerly of: Local Natives

Kelcey Ayer is a Colombian-American musician and co-founder of Los Angeles-based indie rock band Local Natives. From 2017-2024, Ayer released solo work as Jaws of Love. Kelcey Ayer exited Local Natives in 2024 and in 2025 released two EPs under his given name. He will open for Jordana on her US tour in March 2026, with stops in 11 cities and a solo show in Chicago.

== Career ==
Kelcey Ayer was raised in Orange County, California, where he was a neighbor of Taylor Rice and Ryan Hahn. The three began writing and performing music together in high school. Ayer attended a private Catholic high school, while Rice and Hahn attended the neighboring Tesoro High School. Ayer attended San Francisco State University before transferring to the University of California, Los Angeles, until he dropped out to pursue music full time.

Kelcey Ayer released six studio albums and two EPs with Local Natives since forming in 2005. Ayer plays keyboards, percussion, and guitar, in addition to singing lead vocals. All members split work on the band's musical output evenly, including cover artwork and songwriting. On February 26, 2011, Local Natives played the Walt Disney Concert Hall in Los Angeles, CA.

From 2017-2024, Kelcey Ayer released music as Jaws of Love., alongside his work with Local Natives.

On April 29, 2024, Ayer announced his amicable departure from Local Natives. He remained with the group for the last phase of their touring in support of the albums Time Will Wait for No One (2023) and But I'll Wait for You (2024). In an Instagram post, Ayer explained his departure: "Being in a band this committed and this intense comes with a lot. It's your entire life, and just doesn't leave a ton of room to build anything else. While I have cherished so so much all that we've built, I've always wanted space and time to build other things. I have my own music and my own interests that I'd like to see flourish, and while my bandmates have always been supportive, the reality is that time is finite. It came to a point that I realized my whole adult life I've been a part of one thing and I just yearn to explore." He also added: "Life is long, and who knows, maybe I'll be LN's John Frusciante, but for now I'll say this is not the end of Local Natives or the end of me."

Kelcey Ayer played KCRW’s School Night in Los Angeles on November 4, 2025. On November 5, 2025, Ayer released a second EP called Hand Me Downs.

Kelcey Ayer will open for Jordana on her US tour in March 2026, with stops in 11 cities and a solo show in Chicago.

== Discography ==
With Local Natives

- Gorilla Manor (2009)
- Hummingbird (2013)
- Sunlit Youth (2016)
- Violet Street (2019)
- Sour Lemon EP (2020)
- Music From the Pen Gala 1983 EP (2021)
- Time Will Wait for No One (2023)
- But I'll Wait for You (2024)

As "Jaws of Love."

- Tasha Sits Close to the Piano (2017)
- Patricia EP (2022)
- Second Life (2022)
- Second Life Second Life: Naked (2024)

As "Kelcey Ayer"

- No Sleep EP (2025)
- Hand Me Downs EP (2025)
