= Sour Lemon =

EP by Local Natives
- Released: October 23, 2020
- Recorded: September 2019
- Studio: Sunset Sound
- Genre: Indie rock
- Length: 14:43
- Label: Loma Vista
- Producer: Chris Coady

Local Natives chronology
| Violet Street (2019) | Sour Lemon (2020) | Time Will Wait for No One (2023) |

Sour Lemon is an EP record by the American indie rock band Local Natives, released on October 23, 2020 on Loma Vista. The EP was recorded in September 2019 with producer Chris Coady during a break in touring behind their fourth studio album, Violet Street (2019).

The release was preceded by the singles, "Statues in the Garden (Arras)" and "Lemon", and supported by a one-off livestream concert on October 21, 2020 due to ongoing COVID-19 pandemic.

The song "Lemon" features co-lead vocals from singer-songwriter Sharon Van Etten.

== Background and composition ==
The four tracks on Sour Lemon date back to the writing and recording sessions for the band's third and fourth studio albums, Sunlit Youth (2016) and Violet Street (2019), with drummer Matthew Frazier noting: "Most of Sour Lemon had actually been sitting around for awhile. Years, to be honest. Most were songs that didn’t quite make sense for Sunlit Youth or Violet Street, but we felt they had more life in them than just being released as b-sides. Since those seeds already existed, we dove into the studio shortly after getting back from [touring] to see them through."

With the EP's announcement, the band noted that its songs weren't intended for a full album release: "We’re always working on new music, but songs tend to come at their own pace. There’s something freeing about writing without the goal of an album in mind. It feels like waking up for class only to realize that it’s Saturday and you can sleep in as long as you want. The songs on Sour Lemon each have their own long histories but they all finally decided to arrive at the same time. Rather than waiting, we decided to share them as soon as we could." Guitarist Ryan Hahn elaborated: "Sometimes it feels like songwriting is like solving a puzzle. It kind of felt that way with these four songs. When you’re making a record, you can spend a lot of time on the tracks. But since we were just recording these, there was no pressure. It’s a nice way to do it."

The track "Lemon", which features a duet between vocalist and guitarist Taylor Rice and Sharon Van Etten, dates back to the Violet Street writing sessions: "Ryan [Hahn] had the very beginning of that song, toward the end of writing for Violet Street, and we didn't finish it in time. We had met Sharon [Van Etten] years ago when we were making Hummingbird with Aaron Dessner in Brooklyn. She was living there, and she just finished an album with Aaron, and she was so sweet." The band connected with Van Etten again after she moved from New York to the band's home city of Los Angeles: "We had the idea to do a co-writing session with her, when she just moved to L.A. She wrote with us on it for one day. So after we did this writing and whatnot, we were like, 'Will you do it with us?' and she was like, 'Yeah I would love to, love the song.' That was so fun collaborating on writing to having a duet, and we just fell in love with her voice."

The EP's first single, "Statues in the Garden (Arras)", was primarily written by guitarist Ryan Hahn while touring in support of the band's second album, Hummingbird (2013): “I wrote "Statues in The Garden" while on tour way back in 2013, the working title "Arras" coming from the French town we were in at the time. For whatever reason, we were never able to get the arrangement to click as a band back then – I remember on a writing trip in Thailand in 2014 we spent hours jamming that song together – but nonetheless we all recognized the potential of the song. Once we decided to book time with Chris Coady [in 2019], I finally came up with the swirling outro and guitar solo. I think another thing that really allowed "Arras" to cross the finish line was Matt [Frazier]’s drumming, which took my chopped samples and programmed beats, and breathed life and personality into them. It’s an incredible live performance on his part."

== Recording ==
Sour Lemon was recorded at Sunset Sound in September 2019 with producer Chris Coady. Guitarist Ryan Hahn noted: “We’d just finished a long run of touring. If I’m being honest, it was pretty difficult at times. Maybe we were glad to be home between tours and we had this feeling of, ‘Alright, we’re not making a record here. We’re making music. Let’s have fun.’”

== Track listing ==
All tracks are written by Local Natives.

| No. | Title | Lead vocals | Length |
|---|---|---|---|
| 1. | "Lemon" | Rice/Van Etten | 3:17 |
| 2. | "Statues in the Garden (Arras)" | Ayer/Rice | 3:56 |
| 3. | "Lost" | Ayer | 3:56 |
| 4. | "Future Lover" | Rice | 3:33 |
| Total length: | | | 14:43 |
