= Past Lives (Local Natives song) =

Single by Local Natives

from the album Sunlit Youth
- Released: 29 April 2016 (stream); 6 May 2016 (single)
- Genre: Indie rock
- Length: 3:43
- Label: Loma Vista
- Songwriter(s): Local Natives
- Producer(s): Local Natives; Brian Joseph

Local Natives singles chronology
"Ceilings" (2013)	"Past Lives" (2016)	"Villainy" (2016)

"Past Lives" is a song by American indie rock band Local Natives. It is the second track and first single from their third studio album, Sunlit Youth, and was released commercially as a digital single on 6 May 2016 on Loma Vista Recordings.

== Background and release ==
Including "Villainy" and "Fountain of Youth," "Past Lives" was one of the first songs written for Sunlit Youth. Taylor Rice wrote the song's lyrics and the music was conceived by the band as a whole.

Before its digital and commercial release, "Past Lives" was featured in the episode "7th" from the first season of the Netflix series Flaked, which was released on March 11, 2016.

The song was released on SoundCloud and streamed on band's website on April 29, 2016, a day after the song was premiered during a surprise performance in San Francisco. It was later released commercially as a digital single on May 6, 2016. In a press release, vocalist and guitarist Taylor Rice said:

The world is not static, it’s made new over and over again. But we tend to live the same patterns in a loop, loving the same way, wrestling the same demons, the same dynamics playing out around us again and again. Untangling every moment and decision that led us to where we are now can make fate feel concrete, inescapable. But our world is not fixed, it’s constantly reemerging, and we can change it into whatever we want.

== Performances ==
On August 4, 2016, Local Natives performed "Past Lives" on The Late Late Show with James Corden. Lyndsey Havens of Consequence of Sound described the performance, saying, "The hook offered an explosion of sound and color, supported by flashing lights and images displayed on a 15 ft. LED screen positioned behind the band. 'Save me, from the prime of my life,' vocalist Taylor Rice sang on the chorus, but with the momentum these indie rockers have going, it seems they don’t need saving."

== Critical reception ==
"Past Lives" received positive reviews from contemporary music critics. Ian Cohen of Pitchfork stated that, "Lyrically, "Past Lives" is concerned with the ways people try to view the present from a million different angles, getting stuck in the moment rather than living in it. It's a call to cast aside patterns and embrace instability, and so "Past Lives" is a fitting title for Local Natives' reintroduction—if it makes the memory of 2013's solemn, Aaron Dessner-produced weeper Hummingbird sound remote, 2010 seems like a different lifetime altogether." In describing the song, Michelle Geslani of Consequence of Sound said, "Effervescent, busy percussion and lush harmonies highlight the track, with Local Natives operating in their comfort zone but pushing for something a little deeper. "Save me from the prime of my life," they plead, before nifty guitar work and lustrous keys cut in around the 2:40 mark."

== Track listing ==
Digital download
No.	Title	Lyrics	Music	Length
1.	"Past Lives"	Taylor Rice	Local Natives	3:43
