= Breakers (song) =

Single by Local Natives

from the album Hummingbird
- Released: October 18, 2012
- Genre: Indie rock
- Length: 4:09
- Label: Infectious; Frenchkiss
- Songwriters: Taylor Rice; Kelcey Ayer; Ryan Hahn; Matt Frazier; Aaron Dessner

Local Natives singles chronology
"World News" (2010)	"Breakers" (2012)	"Heavy Feet" (2013)

"Breakers" is a song by indie rock band Local Natives, from the band's second studio album Hummingbird. The song was released as a single on October 18, 2012.

== Reception ==
"Breakers" received positive reviews from most music critics. The song was chosen upon release as Pitchfork's "Best New Track". Ian Cohen noted that "you can hear the influence of tourmates Arcade Fire and the National in the drums and the production, which shift Local Natives away from the more wooly sounds of Gorilla Manor to something more streamlined and arena-filling." He also noted that "where those bands often sound like they're pushing back at the weight of society's ills and aging, Local Natives still retain their youthful vigor and identifiable quirks with swaying, full-bodied harmonies and a dynamic booster shot of a chorus."
