= Megan Leavey =

US Marine K9 Handler

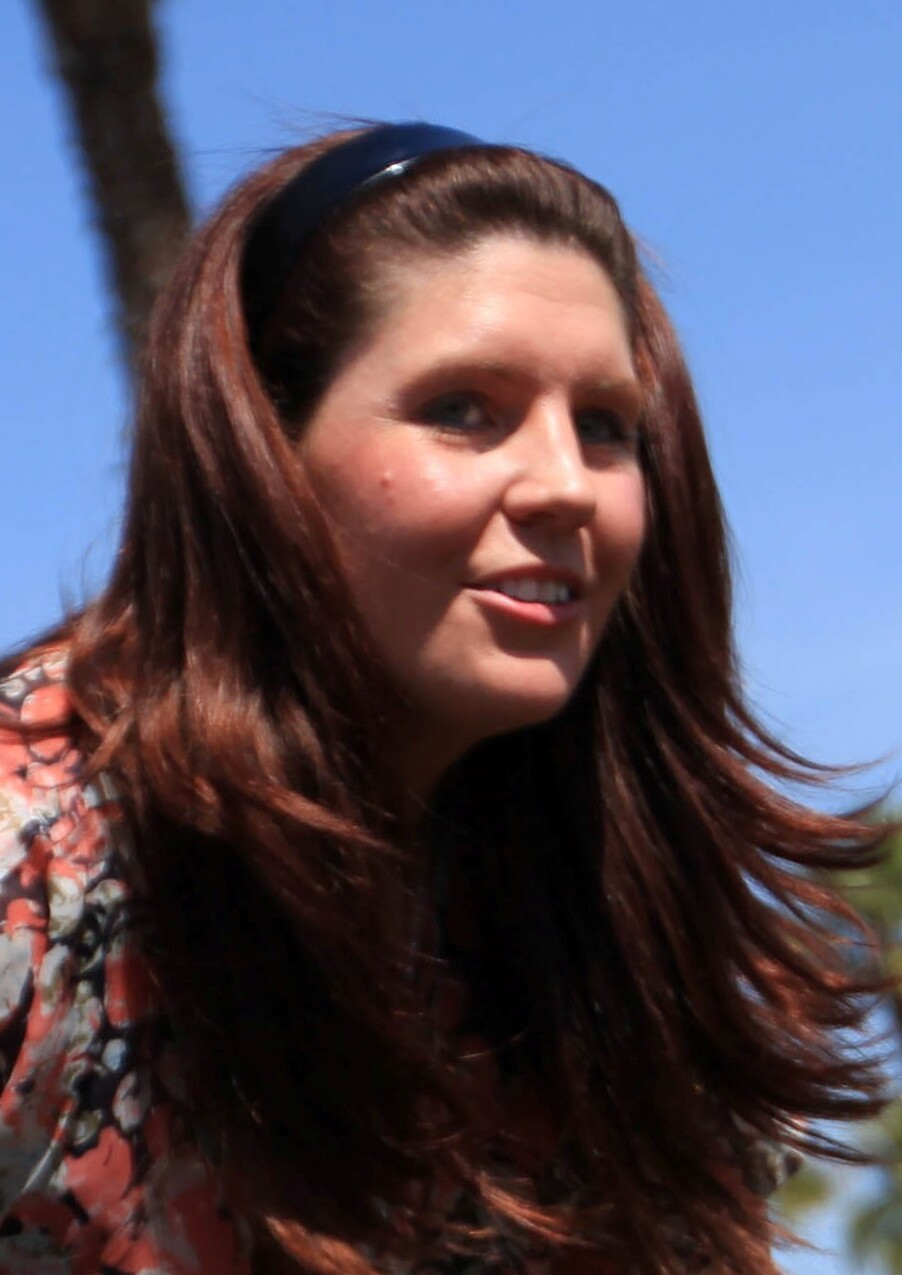
- Leavey in 2012
- Born: October 28, 1983 (age 43); Valley Cottage, New York, U.S.
- Military career
- Allegiance: United States of America
- Branch: United States Marine Corps
- Service years: 2003–2007
- Rank: Corporal
- Conflicts: Iraq War
- Awards: Purple Heart; Navy and Marine Corps Achievement Medal (2) with V Device; Combat Action Ribbon

Corporal Megan Leavey (born October 28, 1983) is a former active duty United States Marine Corps corporal who served as a Military Police K9 handler.

== Life and career ==
Leavey enlisted in the Marine Corps in August 2003 and completed recruit training at the Marine Corps Recruit Depot Parris Island in South Carolina. Afterwards, she attended and completed the Military Police school in San Antonio, Texas, where she joined the K-9 program and was paired with a military working dog named "Rex" (E168) in October 2004. Leavey was stationed next at Camp Pendleton, California, assigned as a military police dog handler with the 2nd Military Police Battalion, II Marine Expeditionary Force (FWD).

The pair served two deployments in Iraq together, first to Fallujah in May 2005, and then to Ramadi in May 2006, where she and the German Shepherd were both wounded the following September by an improvised explosive device (IED) while she and her dog were leading a U.S. Army patrol down a street. Leavey was awarded the Purple Heart.

Leavey first sought to adopt Rex before she was honorably discharged from the Marine Corps in December 2007 with the rank of corporal. Four years later, when Rex developed facial palsy that ended his bomb-sniffing duties, Leavey again petitioned the Marine Corps for his adoption. In April 2012, "Sergeant Rex" was retired by the Marine Corps at Camp Pendleton's K-9 unit and Leavey and the dog were reunited through the intervention and support of Senator Chuck Schumer, Randy Levine and his wife Mindy, president of the New York Yankees baseball club, and others. While living with Leavey, Rex died of old age on December 22, 2012.

Leavey and Rex became the subject of the 2017 biographical film Megan Leavey. Leavey is portrayed by Kate Mara, and had a cameo appearance in the film as "Female Drill Instructor #3". In 2019, she was one of two recipients of the Genesis Legacy Medal which was presented to her by the National Purple Heart Honor Mission.

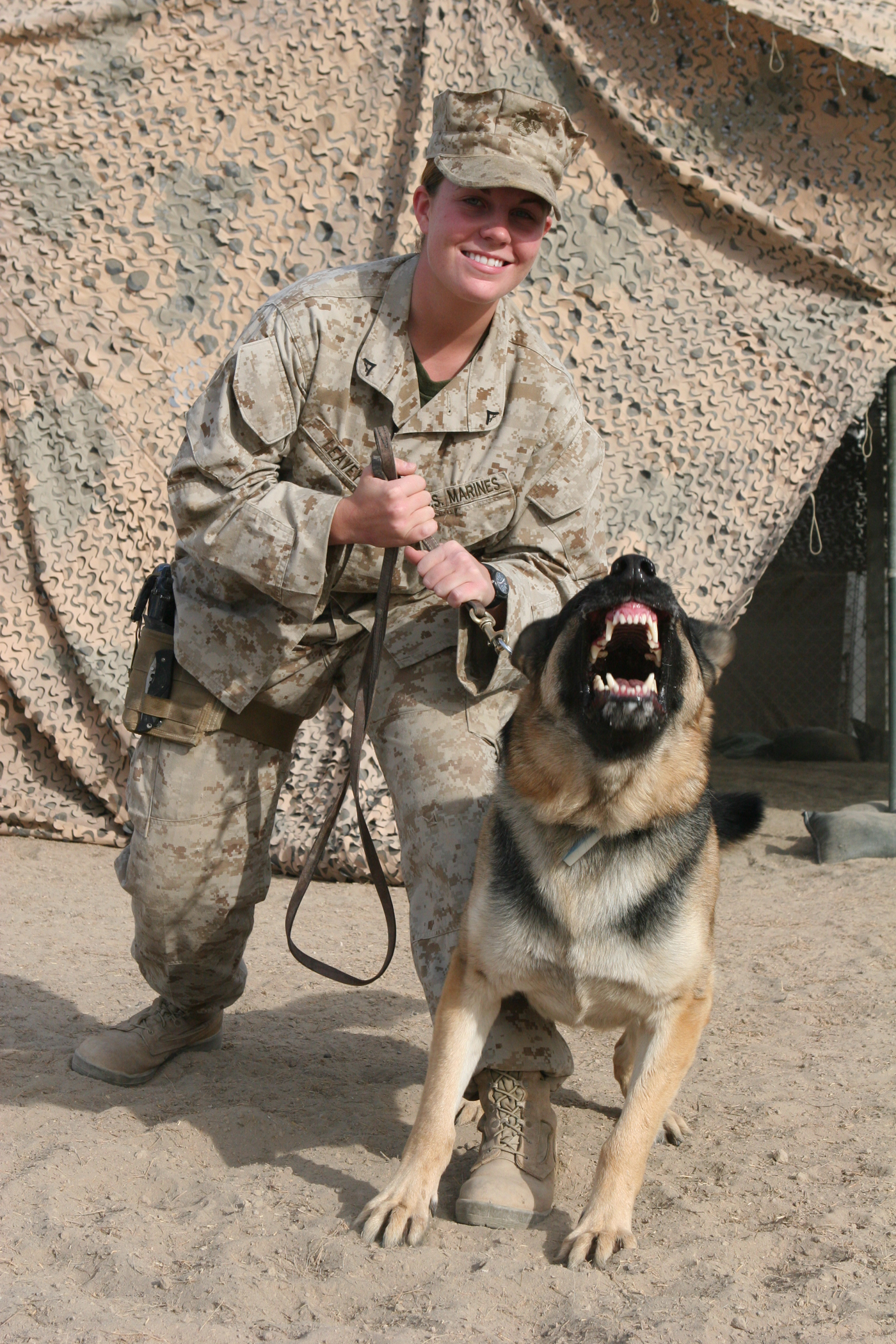
Lance Corporal Leavey with Rex in Iraq, November 2005

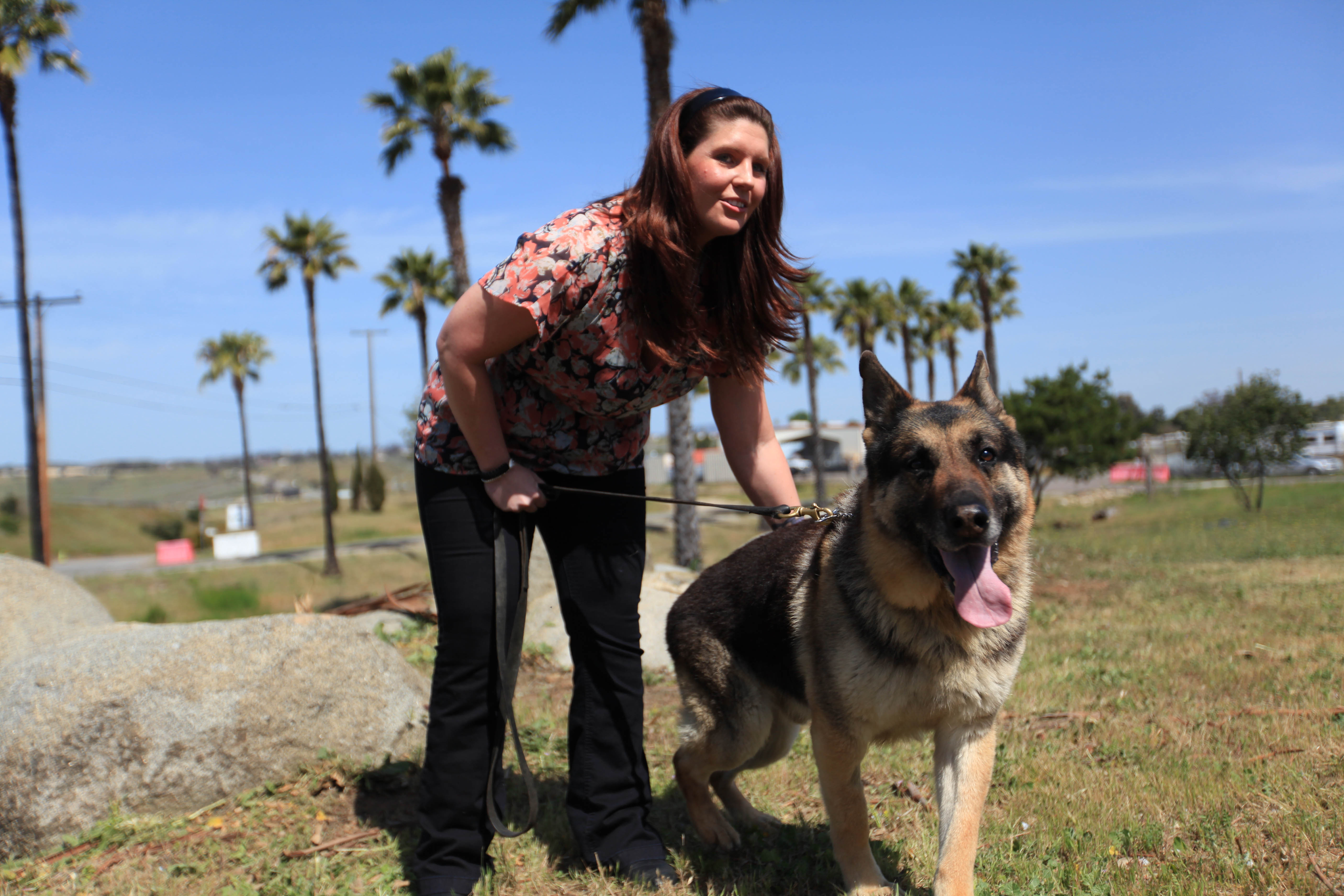
Megan Leavey pets Rex at Camp Pendleton

== Military awards ==
Leavey received the following decorations and awards:

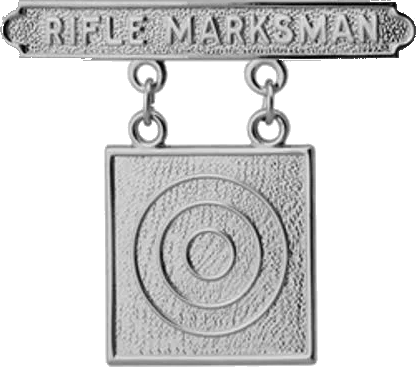
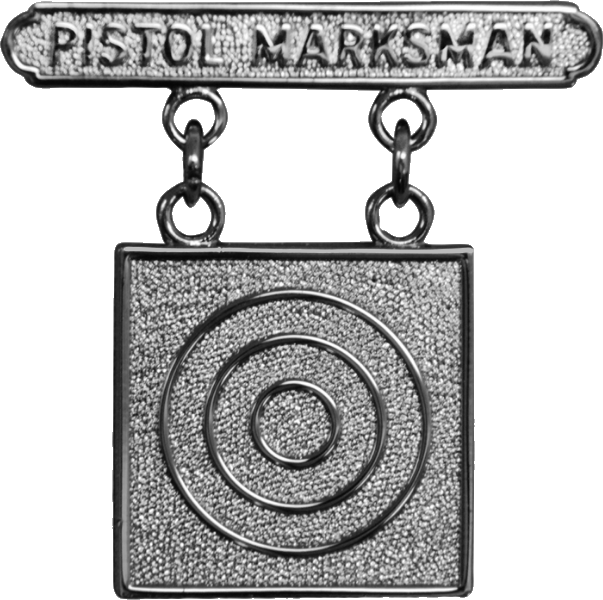

1st row	Purple Heart		Navy and Marine Corps Achievement Medal w/ "V" device and one 5/16" Gold Star
2nd row	Combat Action Ribbon	Marine Corps Good Conduct Medal	National Defense Service Medal
3rd row	Iraq Campaign Medal w/ one 3/16" bronze star	Global War on Terrorism Service Medal	Navy Sea Service Deployment Ribbon w/ one 3/16" bronze star
Badges	Marine Corps Rifle Marksman Badge		Marine Corps Pistol Marksman Badge

== Other honors ==
- Leavey and Rex were honored during a pregame ceremony at Yankee Stadium on May 13, 2012.
- Leavey received Rockland County, New York's first annual "Freedom Award" on March 19, 2013.
- A new dog park "Clarkstown K-9 Corrals" was dedicated to Leavey and Rex (and the Clarkstown Police K-9's) at Congers Lake Memorial Park in Congers, New York, on September 21, 2018.
