= When Am I Gonna Lose You =

Single by Local Natives

from the album Violet Street
- Released: March 7, 2019
- Recorded: November 24, 2018
- Studio: CSLMI Studios and BLVD Studios, Los Angeles, California
- Genre: Indie rock
- Length: 4:24
- Label: Loma Vista
- Songwriter(s): Taylor Rice; Kelcey Ayer; Ryan Hahn
- Producer(s): Shawn Everett

Local Natives singles chronology
"The Only Heirs" (2017)	"When Am I Gonna Lose You" (2019)	"Café Amarillo" (2019)

"When Am I Gonna Lose You" is a song by American indie rock band Local Natives, released as the lead single from their fourth studio album Violet Street on March 7, 2019.

== Music and lyrics ==
Lead singer Taylor Rice was inspired to write the song after a trip to Big Sur, California, he took with his then-girlfriend (now wife). On the trip, Rice's girlfriend cut his long hair short, leading him to "come to terms with what it means to want to be vulnerable with someone forever". The couple listened to the final mix of the song as they drove to Big Sur to get married.

The lyrics concern anxiety in a good relationship, particularly the feeling that it will soon come to an end despite no obvious signs of trouble. The song opens with "two urgent and dueling sounds: soft piano chords juxtaposed with a tight and rugged baseline" and deviates from the usual Verse-chorus form song structure in the second half. The bridge turns into a chorus itself, with a shortened version of the original chorus playing at the end. The band explained in an interview with Consequence of Sound, saying "Approaching the half-way point, the second verse lyrics and pre-chorus melodies change".

The song was difficult to record for the band, who struggled to get the exact sound they were looking for. Over twenty-five versions were recorded over a ten-month period before the final mix was completed in November 2018. All twenty-five of these demos were eventually released on the band's YouTube channel and Spotify.

Rice later revealed the song was influenced by American rock band Fleetwood Mac, the 2007 period drama film There Will Be Blood, and producer Shawn Everett's pet dog Brussels.

== Music video ==
To accompany the song, a music video starring actress Kate Mara was released, directed by Van Alpert. Mara plays "a Los Angeles woman who is rich, beautiful, glamorous, and profoundly alone". She aimlessly shops at a supermarket, lunches at a diner, wanders around an empty theater, and stares at the view from a balcony at her mansion while drinking champagne. Some reviewers speculated Mara's character has just gone through a breakup, citing the lack of other characters and dialogue. Kevin Bronson of Buzzbands.la described the video as "[finding] Mara looking very much like she’s already lost someone, and maybe expecting someone else." The members of Local Natives appear in the background as other shoppers in the opening supermarket scene.

== Charts ==
Chart (2020)	Peak position
Canada Rock (Billboard)	45
US Hot Rock & Alternative Songs (Billboard)	17
US Alternative Airplay (Billboard)	7
US Adult Alternative Airplay	5
