= But I'll Wait for You =

2024 studio album by Local Natives

Studio album by Local Natives
- Released: April 19, 2024
- Studio: Sargent Recorders; Valentine Recording Studios; 64 Sound; Willoughby Recorders; Balboa Recording Studio; Big Bad Sound; Gold Diggers Sound (Los Angeles)
- Length: 34:56
- Label: Loma Vista; Concord
- Producer: John Congleton; Michael Harris; Local Natives; Danny Reisch

Local Natives chronology
Time Will Wait for No One (2023)	But I'll Wait for You (2024)

Singles from But I'll Wait for You
- 1. "April" Released: March 25, 2024; 2. "Alpharetta" Released: April 5, 2024

But I'll Wait for You is the sixth studio album by American indie rock band Local Natives. It was released on April 19, 2024, through Loma Vista Recordings and Concord.

The album comes nine months after the band's fifth studio album, Time Will Wait for No One (2023), and is described as its companion or "sister" album. It was preceded by the singles "April" and "Alpharetta". It is the final album to feature co-lead vocalist and multi-instrumentalist Kelcey Ayer, who announced his departure from the band on April 29, 2024, ten days following the album's release.

== Background ==
Recorded during the same sessions as Time Will Wait for No One, Local Natives described the album as "the second half of a large body of music we made together, the first half we shared last year with Time Will Wait for No One. It's a companion piece. A sister album. Maybe not an answer to a question, but an exhale to an inhale. So little is in our control, but among all this chaos we can choose to be there for each other. Thank you again to John Congleton, Michael Harris, and Danny Reisch, the incredibly talented producers who helped us bring these songs into their fully realized selves."

On April 29, 2024, ten days after the album's release, Local Natives announced the amicable departure of founding member Kelcey Ayer, who will, however, remain with the group for the last phase of their touring in support of Time Will Wait for No One and But I'll Wait for You.

== Release ==
The album's lead single, "April", was released simultaneously with the album announcement on March 25, 2024. "Alpharetta" was released as the second single on April 5, 2024. But I'll Wait for You was released by Loma Vista on April 19, 2024.

== Critical reception ==
Professional ratings
Review scores
Source	Rating
AllMusic	3.5/5 stars
Far Out	2/5 stars
God Is in the TV	7/10
Under the Radar	7/10

Writing for AllMusic, Matt Collar rated the album three-and-a-half out of five stars and wrote, "The fact that Local Natives are able to pull a wholly separate, not to mention catchy and emotionally engaging, album from those initial Congleton sessions speaks to the high level of quality and artistic inspiration they were working with."

== Track listing ==
All lyrics are written by Kelcey Ayer, Nik Ewing, Matthew Frazier, Ryan Hahn, and Taylor Rice, except where noted; all music is composed by Ayer, Ewing, Frazier, Hahn, and Rice.

But I'll Wait for You track listing
No.	Title	Lyrics	Producer(s)	Length
1.	"Alpharetta"		Local Natives	3:47
2.	"Throw It in the Fire"		Local Natives; Michael Harris	3:50
3.	"Neon Memory"		Local Natives	3:33
4.	"Camera Shy"		John Congleton	3:42
5.	"As Soon as You Arrive"		Congleton; Ryan Hahn	3:09
6.	"Ending Credits"		Congleton	3:09
7.	"Raincoat"		Congleton	3:32
8.	"April"	Ayer, Ewing, Frazier, Rice	Local Natives	2:59
9.	"Walk Before You Run"		Hahn	4:01
10.	"But I'll Wait for You"	Ayer, Ewing, Hahn, Rice	Harris; Danny Reisch	3:14
Total length:				34:56

== Personnel ==
Local Natives

- Kelcey Ayer – vocals, guitar (all tracks); piano (tracks 1–3, 6, 9, 10), synthesizer (1, 4), keyboards (2, 6, 9), bass guitar (6), organ (8, 10)
- Nik Ewing – synthesizer (tracks 1–3, 5–8, 10), bass guitar (1, 2, 4, 7–9), piano (1, 2, 5, 7, 10), samples (1, 5, 6), keyboards (1, 5, 7, 8), Mellotron (2, 4–6), Moog bass (2), vibraphone (7, 8)
- Matthew Frazier – drums (tracks 2–4, 6–10), percussion (2, 4, 5, 7, 8), drum machine (5), conga (8)
- Ryan Hahn – guitar (all tracks), electric guitar (tracks 1, 2, 4–10), acoustic guitar (1, 8); conga, Moog bass (2); bass guitar (3–5, 10), percussion (4, 5, 8), synthesizer (5, 8); keyboards, samples (8)
- Taylor Rice – vocals, guitar (all tracks), acoustic guitar (tracks 1, 2), bass guitar (1), electric guitar (2–10), samples (2); piano, synthesizer (7); organ (10)

Additional contributors

- Ruairi O'Flaherty – mastering
- Dean Reid – mixing (tracks 1–3, 8)
- John Congleton – mixing (tracks 4–7, 9), engineering (4, 7), choir (9)
- Michael Harris – engineering (tracks 1, 2, 8, 10)
- Tyler Nuffer – engineering, pedal steel, steel guitar (track 1)
- Danny Reisch – engineering (tracks 2, 3, 10), string arrangement (2)
- Sean Cook – engineering (tracks 5, 6, 9)
- Budapest Scoring Orchestra – strings (track 2)

Art

- Nik Ewing – art direction, design
- Ramón Coronado – art direction, design
- Marshall Rake – art direction, design
- Jonathan Chu – photography
