= Local Natives =

American indie rock band

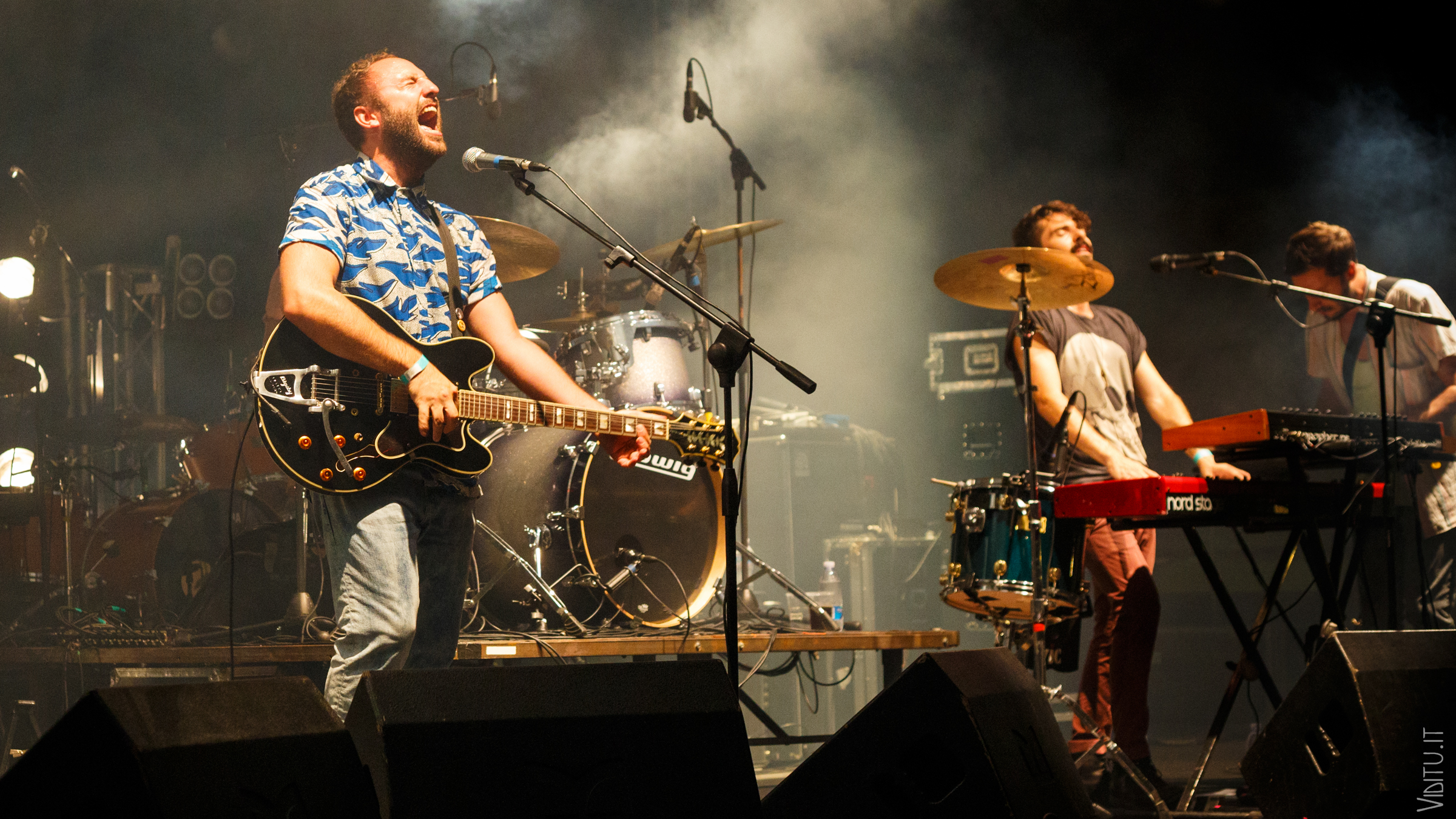
- Local Natives performing in 2013

Background information
- Also known as: Cavil at Rest
- Origin: Orange County, California, U.S.
- Genre: Indie rock
- Years active: 2005–present
- Labels: Frenchkiss, Infectious, Loma Vista
- Members: Taylor Rice; Ryan Hahn; Matthew Frazier; Nik Ewing
- Past members: Kelcey Ayer: Andy Hamm
- Website: localnatives.com

Local Natives is an American indie rock band formed in Orange County, California, and based in Los Angeles. The band currently consists of Taylor Rice (vocals, guitar), Ryan Hahn (guitar, backing vocals), Matthew Frazier (drums) and Nik Ewing (bass, keyboards, vocals). Former co-lead vocalist and multi-instrumentalist Kelcey Ayer was a member of the band from its foundation in 2005 until 2024. Before taking its current name in 2008, Local Natives was called Cavil at Rest.

Named after the house the band members all shared in Orange County, the band's debut studio album, Gorilla Manor, was released in 2009 to positive reviews and extensive touring. Their second studio album, Hummingbird (2013), was recorded with producer Aaron Dessner, with its lyrical content influenced by the departure of founding bass guitarist Andy Hamm and the recent death of Ayer's mother. Their third album, Sunlit Youth, was released in September 2016 and their fourth, Violet Street, was released in April 2019.

After a period of personal turmoil, the band recorded their fifth and sixth studio albums, Time Will Wait for No One (2023) and But I'll Wait for You (2024), concurrently. Following their release, Kelcey Ayer announced his amicable departure from the band and performed his final show with the band in November 2024.

== History ==
=== 2005–2008: Formation and early career ===
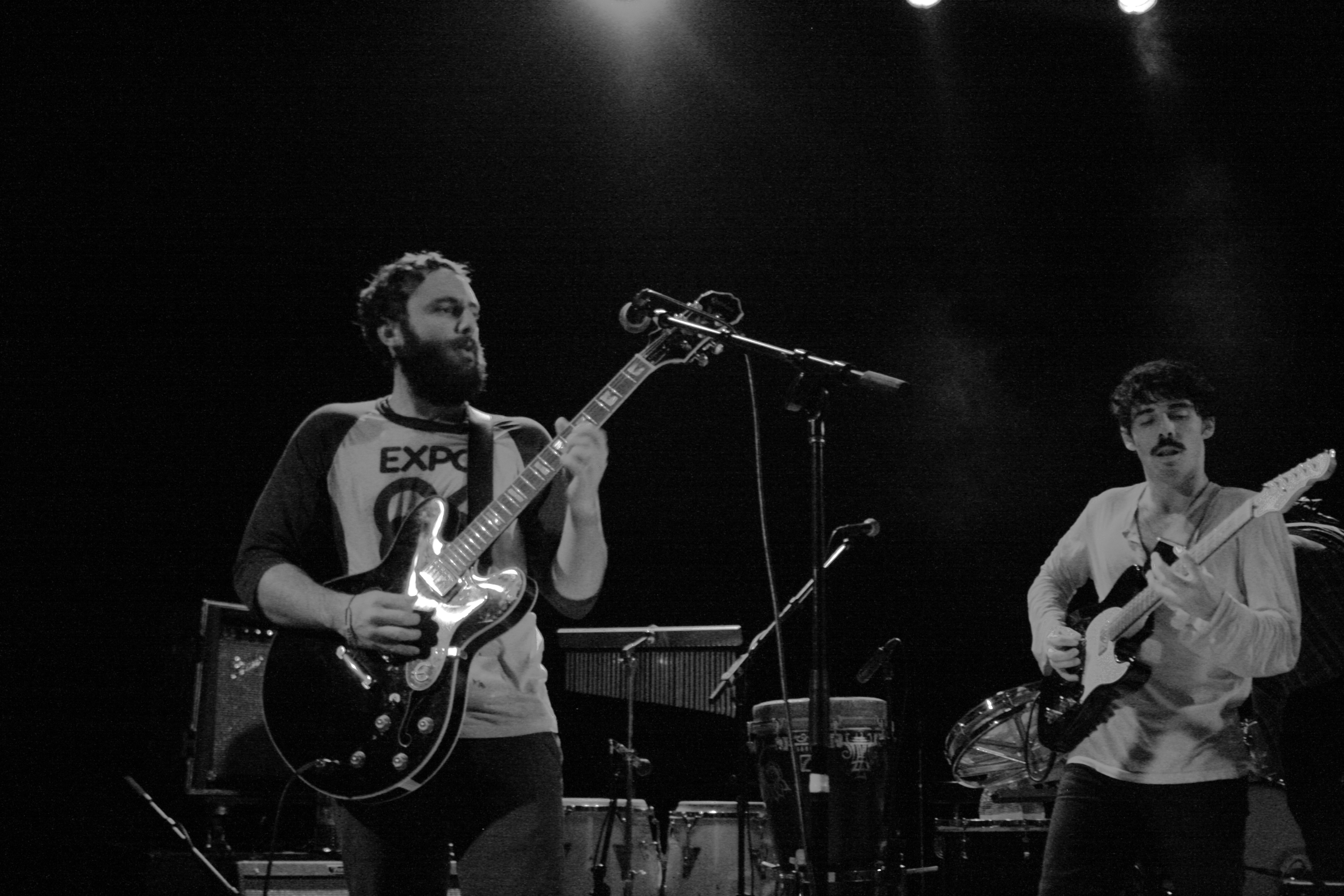
Kelcey Ayer (left) and Taylor Rice (right) in 2009

The band originates from Orange County, California, where Taylor Rice, Ryan Hahn and Kelcey Ayer grew up near each other. Rice and Hahn began playing guitar together in junior high school. Ayer attended a private Catholic high school, while Rice and Hahn attended Tesoro High School in Las Flores. In 2001, during their sophomore year at Tesoro, Rice and Hahn formed the group Cavil at Rest. The group went through several incarnations and Ayer began playing music with them in his senior year. In 2004, the lineup consisted of Rice, Hahn, Ayer, Chris Filley, Andy Savage and Mike Rosenbaum. Throughout college, the group played music and sang together.

The band coalesced with the addition of bassist Andy Hamm in 2005, and drummer Matthew Frazier in 2006. Cavil at Rest opened for Jimmy Eat World at Firestone Fieldhouse in fall 2005. Hahn graduated from Pepperdine University. Rice was a communications studies student at UCLA. Ayer, who was attending San Francisco State University, transferred to UCLA, but after Rice graduated in 2008, he dropped out in order for them to focus on Local Natives full-time. In the summer of 2008, the band changed its name to Local Natives and started work on their debut album. Except for Hamm, all of the members were living together in a duplex in Orange. In December 2008, they all moved into a house in Silver Lake.

=== 2009–2011: Gorilla Manor and Hamm's departure ===
Everything the band creates comes from a complete collaboration between their members, from songwriting to artwork. Their debut album, Gorilla Manor, was named after the house they all shared in Orange County, where most of the album was written. "It was insanely messy and there were always friends over knocking around on guitars or our thrift store piano," said Hahn. "It was an incredible experience and I'll never forget that time." The self-funded Gorilla Manor was recorded by Raymond Richards in his own Red Rockets Glare Studio, in West Los Angeles, and was produced by Richards and the band. The third track on Gorilla Manor, "Sun Hands", first appeared on the Cavil at Rest album Orion Way.

The band started to attract the attention of the music press after playing nine shows at the 2009 SXSW festival in Austin, Texas, where initial reviews drew favorable comparisons to Arcade Fire, Fleet Foxes, and Vampire Weekend, as well as "sort of a West Coast Grizzly Bear."

In 2010, the group's song Wide Eyes became known in Australia after appearing during an election campaign advertisement for the Australian Democrats. In 2011, they embarked on a European tour, served as opening act for Edward Sharpe and the Magnetic Zeros, and made their debut in Australia at St Jerome's Laneway Festival

It was announced March 18, 2011, that the band had parted ways with bassist Andy Hamm. A post on the band's website stated, "It is with extremely heavy hearts that we announce that we have recently parted ways with our bassist Andy Hamm. Due to unresolved differences within the band, we strongly feel that, in order to continue in a positive direction, this is the best course of action. We wish Andy the best and will miss him deeply."

=== 2012–2013: Hummingbird and the arrival of Ewing ===
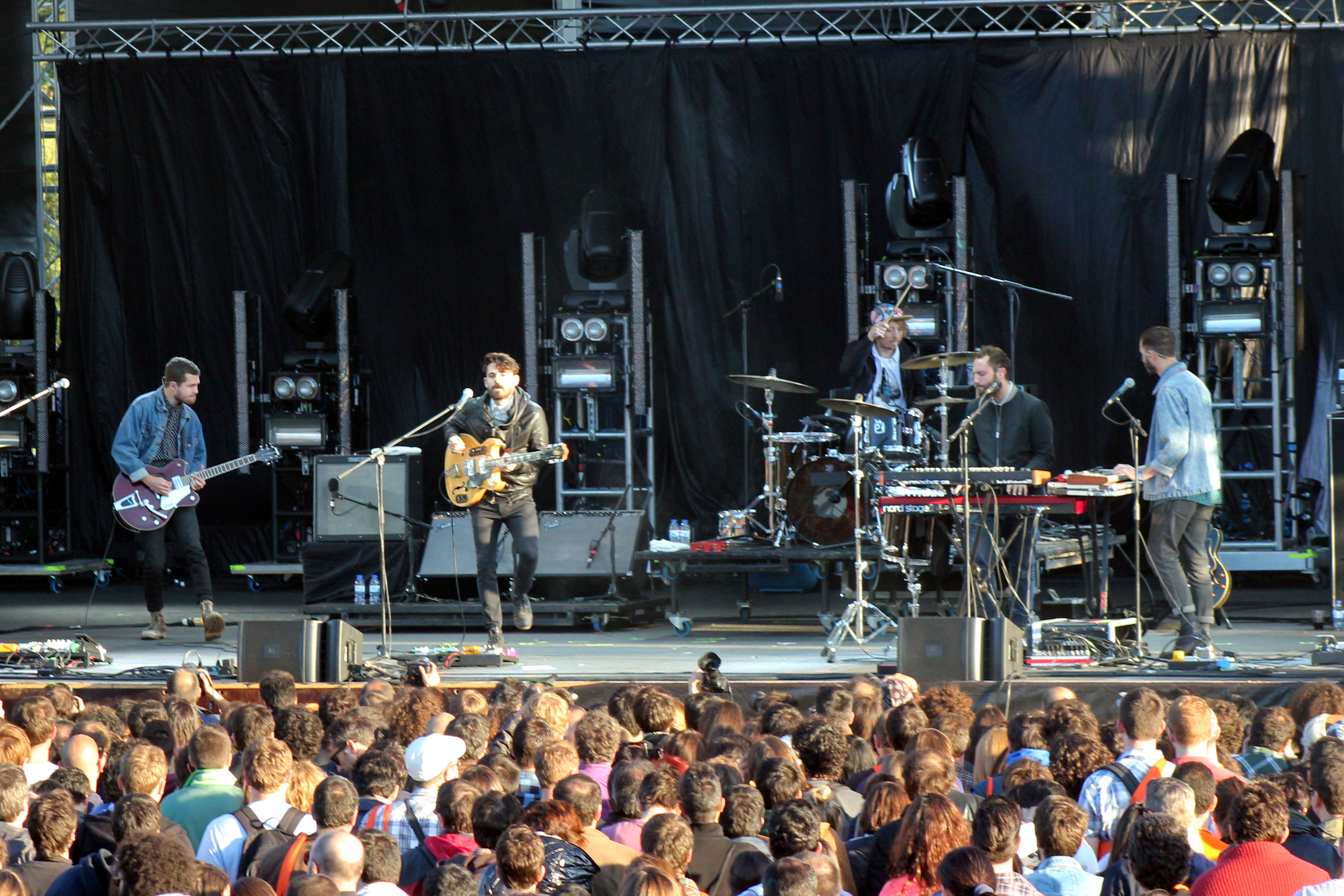
Local Natives onstage at Optimus Primavera Sound in 2013

At Lollapalooza the band announced that they built a new studio and were working on completing their second full-length album, Hummingbird, which was released January 29, 2013. Hummingbird was produced by Aaron Dessner of The National, and though it departed from the "battle-cry urgency" of Gorilla Manor's Sun Hands, singer-guitarist Taylor Rice does not look at 'Hummingbird' as a darker album pointing out moments of optimism, and attributing the altered subject matter to the changes and emotions that came in the years since their debut, such as Ayer's mother passing away from breast cancer.

In 2012, Nik Ewing joined the band as their touring bassist before he was announced as an official member at Austin City Limits on October 11, 2013.

=== 2014–2018: Sunlit Youth ===
In August 2014, at a concert in Salt Lake City, Utah, as part of the Twilight Concert Series, the band announced that they had already begun work on their third studio album.

On April 29, 2016, Local Natives released a new single, "Past Lives", saying, "The world is not static, it's made new over and over again. But we tend to live the same patterns in a loop, loving the same way, wrestling the same demons, the same dynamics playing out around us again and again. Untangling every moment and decision that led us to where we are now can make fate feel concrete, inescapable. But our world is not fixed, it's constantly reemerging, and we can change it into whatever we want." In May 2016, the band premiered the first songs from the album live.

The album Sunlit Youth was released on September 9, 2016. The single "I Saw You Close Your Eyes" was released on March 23, 2017, followed by another one-off single on May 19, 2017, "The Only Heirs", a collaboration with Nico Segal.

On September 22, 2017, Kelcey released his debut solo album, Tasha Sits Close to the Piano, under the name Jaws of Love. On December 21, 2018, under the name Chewing, Nik released his debut solo album, Pacific Ocean Blue, a cover of Dennis Wilson's 1977 album in its entirety.

=== 2019–2020: Violet Street and Sour Lemon ===
On March 8, 2019, the band announced their fourth studio album, Violet Street, releasing a music video "When Am I Gonna Lose You", which featured actress Kate Mara. Violet Street was released on April 26, 2019, and received generally positive reviews, garnering a 7.2 by Pitchfork's Ian Cohen. The band embarked on a world tour and made guest appearances on numerous television and YouTube music series, performing "When Am I Gonna Lose You" on the likes of Ellen, Jimmy Kimmel Live! and Enmore Audio.

In October 2020, the band released an EP, Sour Lemon, recorded in September 2019 with producer Chris Coady. The release was supported by a one-off livestream concert on October 21, 2020, due to the COVID-19 pandemic as well as performances on Ellen and Jimmy Kimmel Live! with Sharon Van Etten.

=== 2021–2024: Time Will Wait for No One, But I'll Wait for You and Ayer's departure ===
In November 2021, the band released the covers EP Music from the Pen Gala 1983, which the band recorded for the Apple TV+ series The Shrink Next Door. It features covers of songs by Roxy Music, Michael McDonald, 10cc, and Gerry Rafferty. The band also starred in an episode of the series as a cover band at the titular Pen Gala.

On August 14, 2021, as they were halfway through creating their fifth album, the band performed at Greek Theatre in Los Angeles. Their first live performance in almost two years due to the COVID-19 pandemic, the band called it "one of the most emotional concerts of our lives". It occurred as members were confronting parenthood, isolation, loss, and identity crisis. After the performance, the band felt unsure of their future and were "on the verge of a collapse". Experiencing their longest separation since they formed, the members were forced to redefine how to work together again. They worked toward developing deeper trust and honesty. As a result, the band found themselves in a prolific period where they wrote more music than they ever have before. Recorded with producers John Congleton, Michael Harris, and Danny Reisch, Time Will Wait for No One was released on July 7, 2023.

The band released a follow-up studio album, called But I'll Wait for You, on April 19, 2024. Recorded during the same sessions as Time Will Wait for No One, Local Natives described it as "the second half of a large body of music we made together, the first half we shared last year with Time Will Wait for No One. It's a companion piece. A sister album. Maybe not an answer to a question, but an exhale to an inhale. So little is in our control, but among all this chaos we can choose to be there for each other. Thank you again to John Congleton, Michael Harris, and Danny Reisch, the incredibly talented producers who helped us bring these songs into their fully realized selves."

On April 29, 2024, the band announced the amicable departure of Kelcey Ayer. However, Ayer would remain with the group for the last phase of their touring in support of these albums. In an Instagram post, Ayer indicated his admiration for the band and his desire to find the time and space in his life for new things. However, he also added: "Life is long, and who knows, maybe I'll be LN's John Frusciante, but for now I'll say this is not the end of Local Natives or the end of me." On June 11, 2024, Ewing announced his second solo album, a collection of minimal piano songs written for his first child. Hahn announced his debut solo project the Heavy Palms EP on July 12, 2024.

In August 2024, they performed the song, "Air is Everywhere", from the children's television in Yo Gabba Gabbaland!, in episode 4, "Air", in Season 1.

The band's final tour with Ayer concluded with their show on November 23, 2024 in Madison, Wisconsin. Following the performance, the band posted: "Our concert in Madison marked the end of our TWWFNOBIWFY tour, and was our last show with Kelcey. A really incredible and celebratory night, really emotional for us all. Thank you for sending him off right, and thank you Kelcey for the years of brotherhood and music."

=== 2025–present: Seventh studio album ===
On June 20, 2026, the band debuted a new track, "Wolves", during a performance in Asheville, North Carolina. Marking their live return, the band added M83's Kaela Sinclair to its live line-up on keyboards and backing vocals.

== Members ==
Current members

- Taylor Rice – lead vocals, guitar (2005–present)
- Ryan Hahn – guitar, keyboards, backing and occasional lead vocals (2005–present)
- Matthew Frazier – drums (2006–present)
- Nik Ewing – bass, keyboards, backing vocals (2012–present)

Current touring members

- Kaela Sinclair – keyboards, backing vocals (2026–present)

Former members

- Kelcey Ayer – lead vocals, keyboards, percussion, guitar (2005–2024)
- Andy Hamm – bass guitar (2005–2011)

Timeline

=== Gallery ===
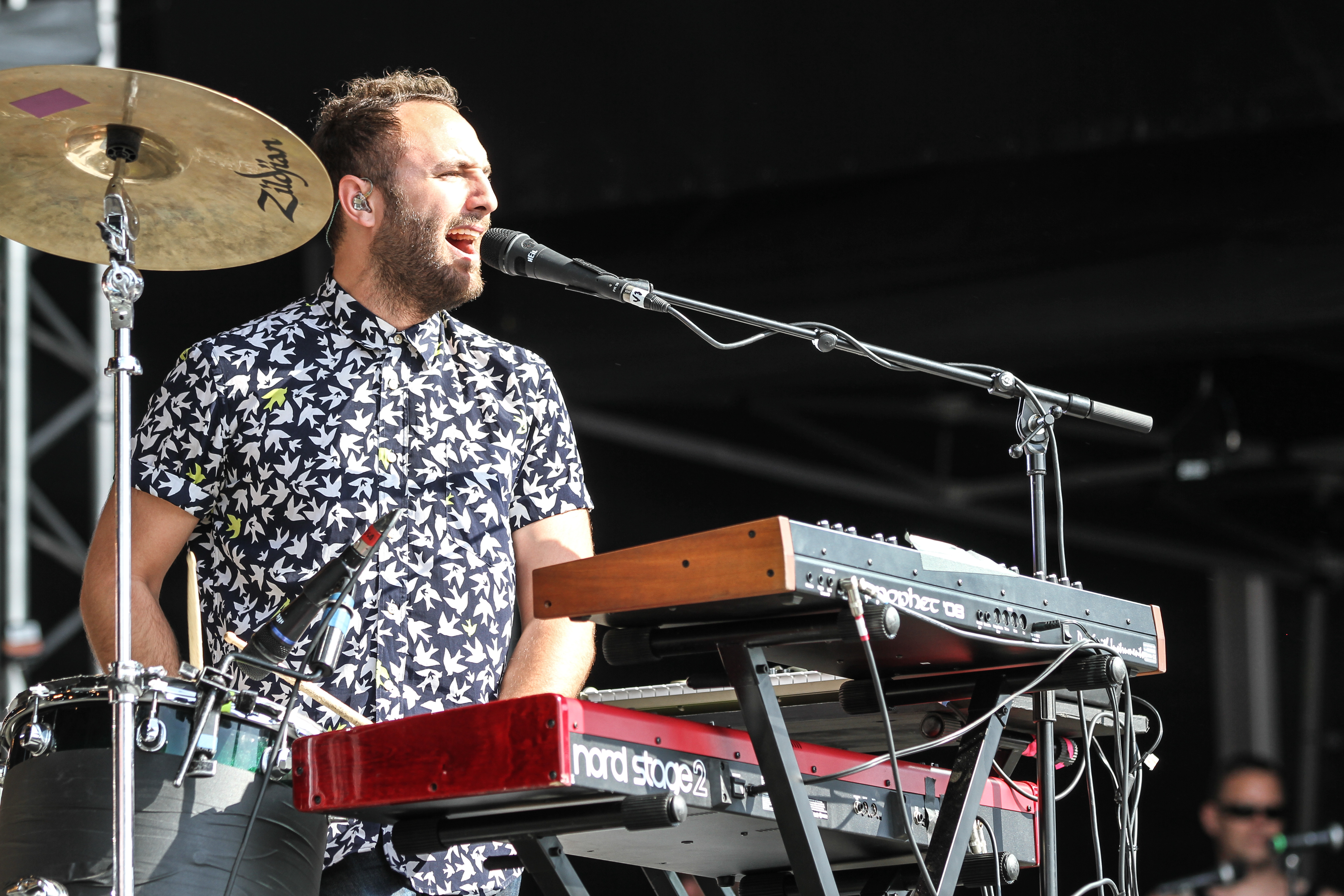
Kelcey Ayer on vocals and keyboards

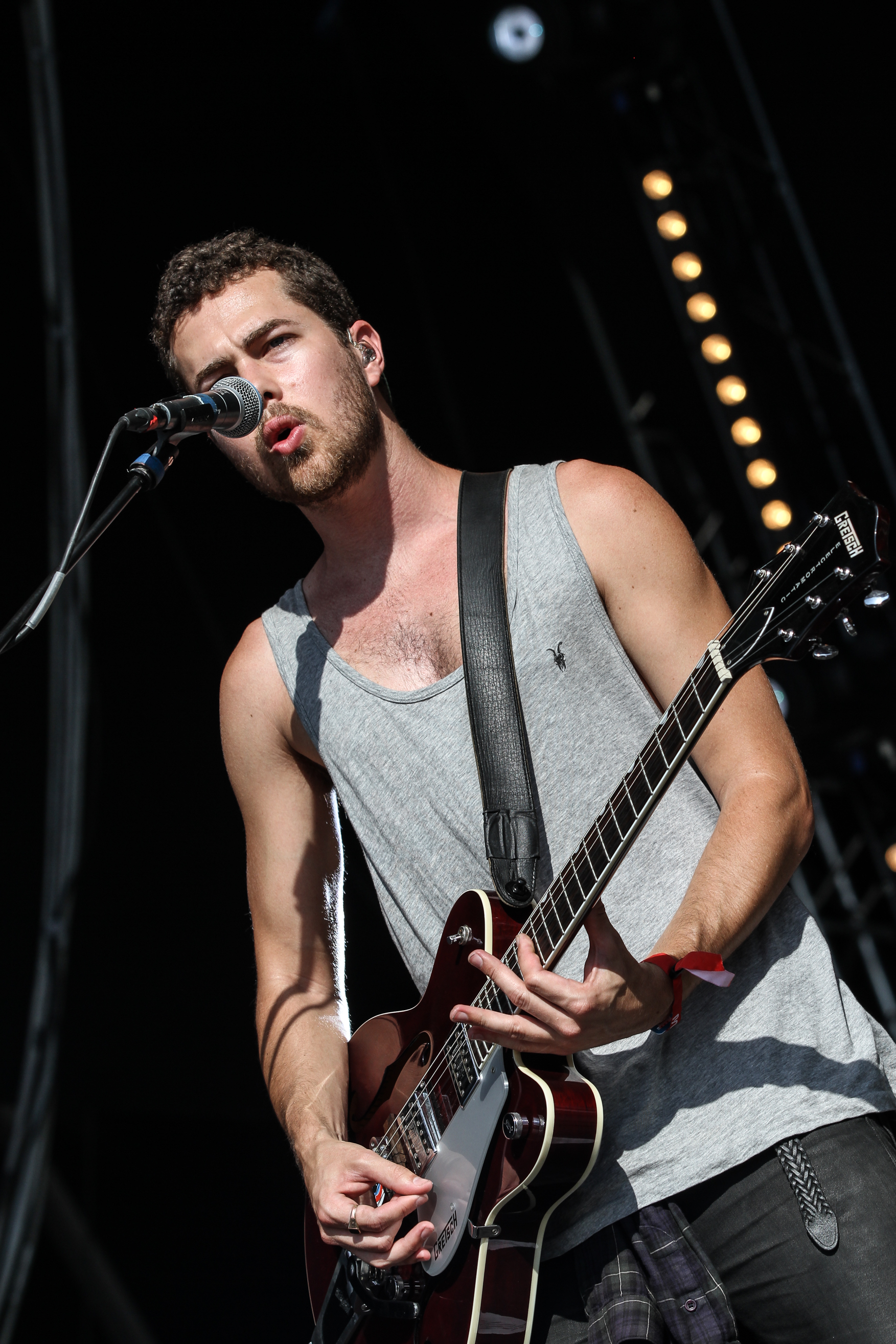
Ryan Hahn on vocals and guitar

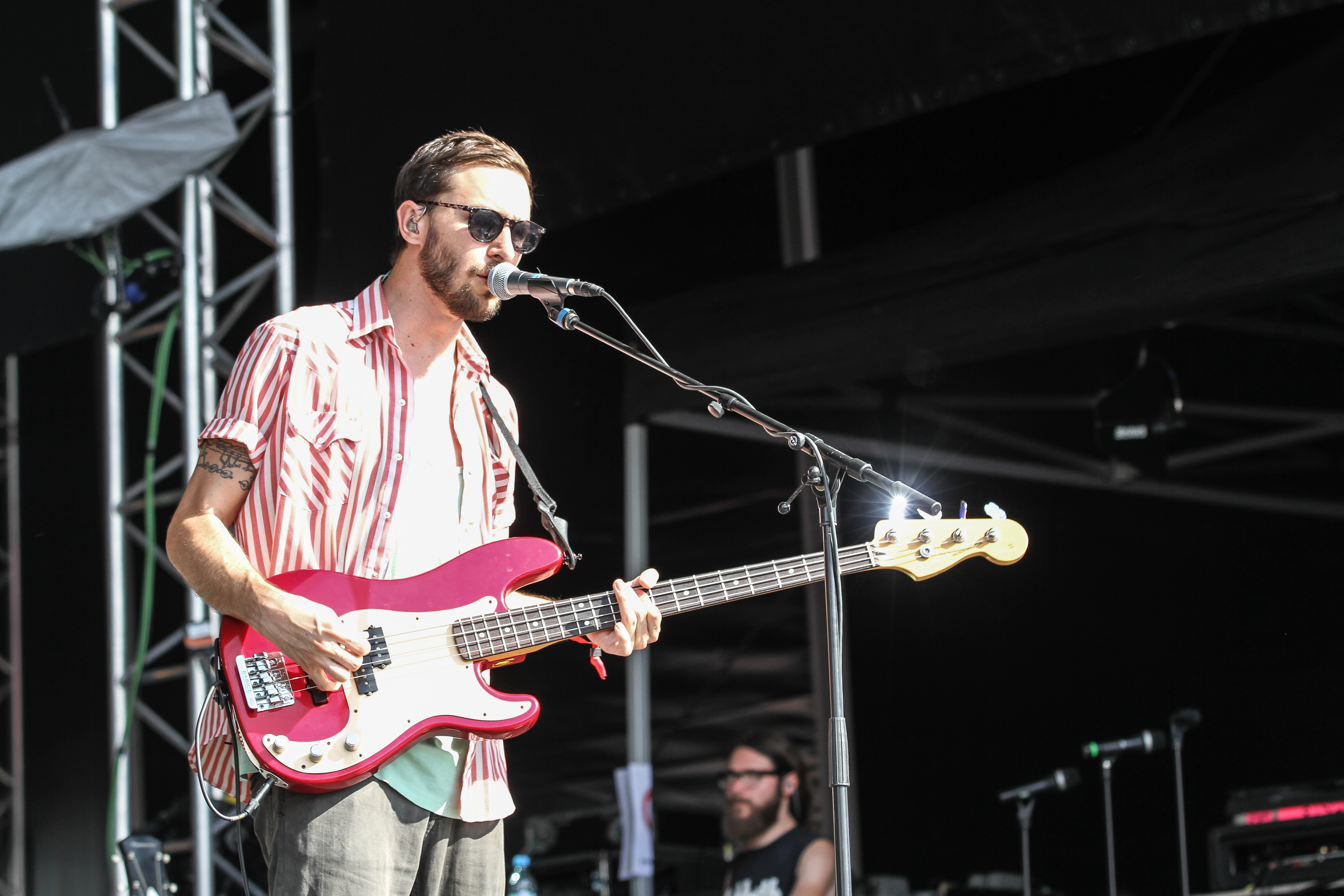
Nik Ewing on vocals and bass guitar

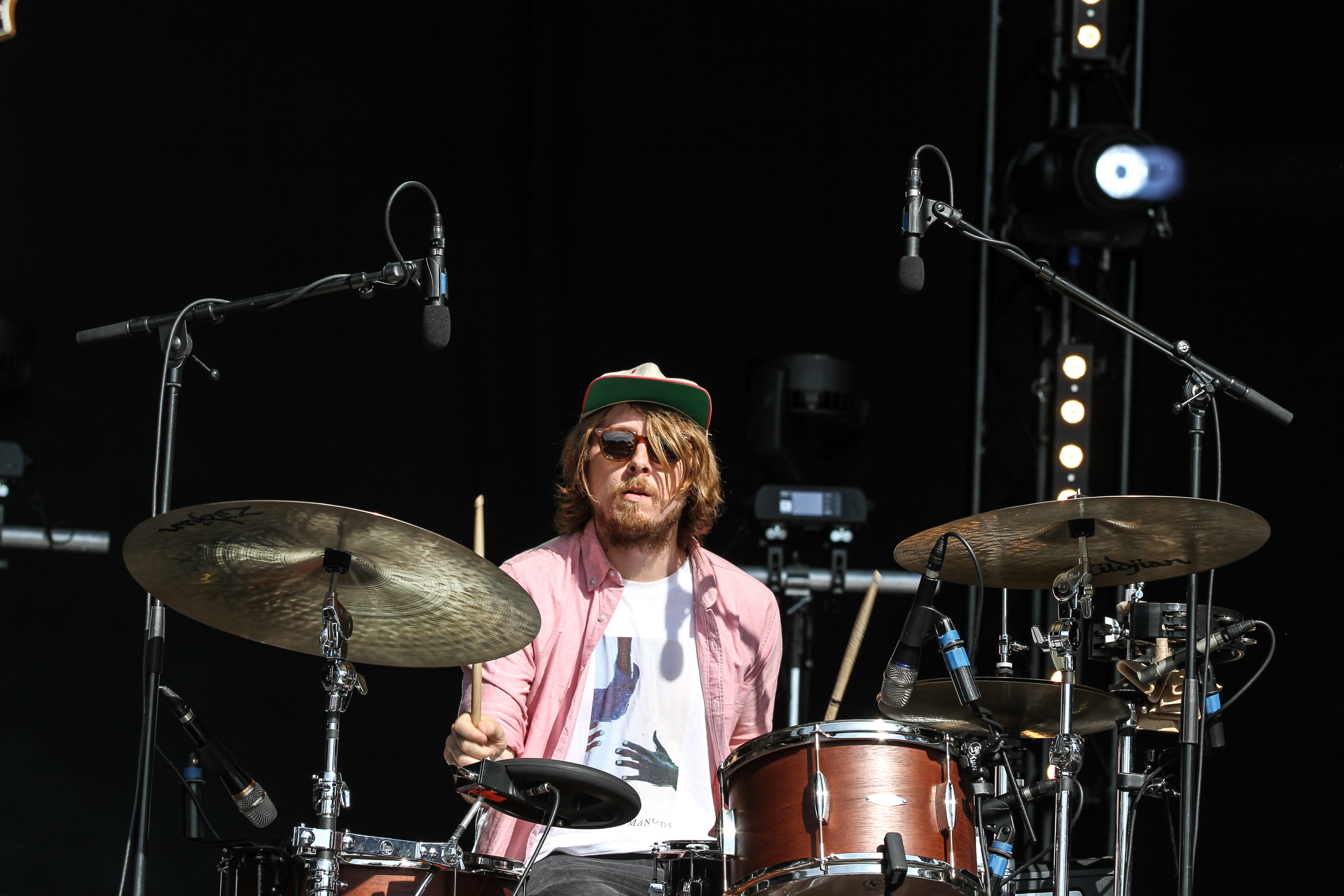
Matthew Frazier on drums

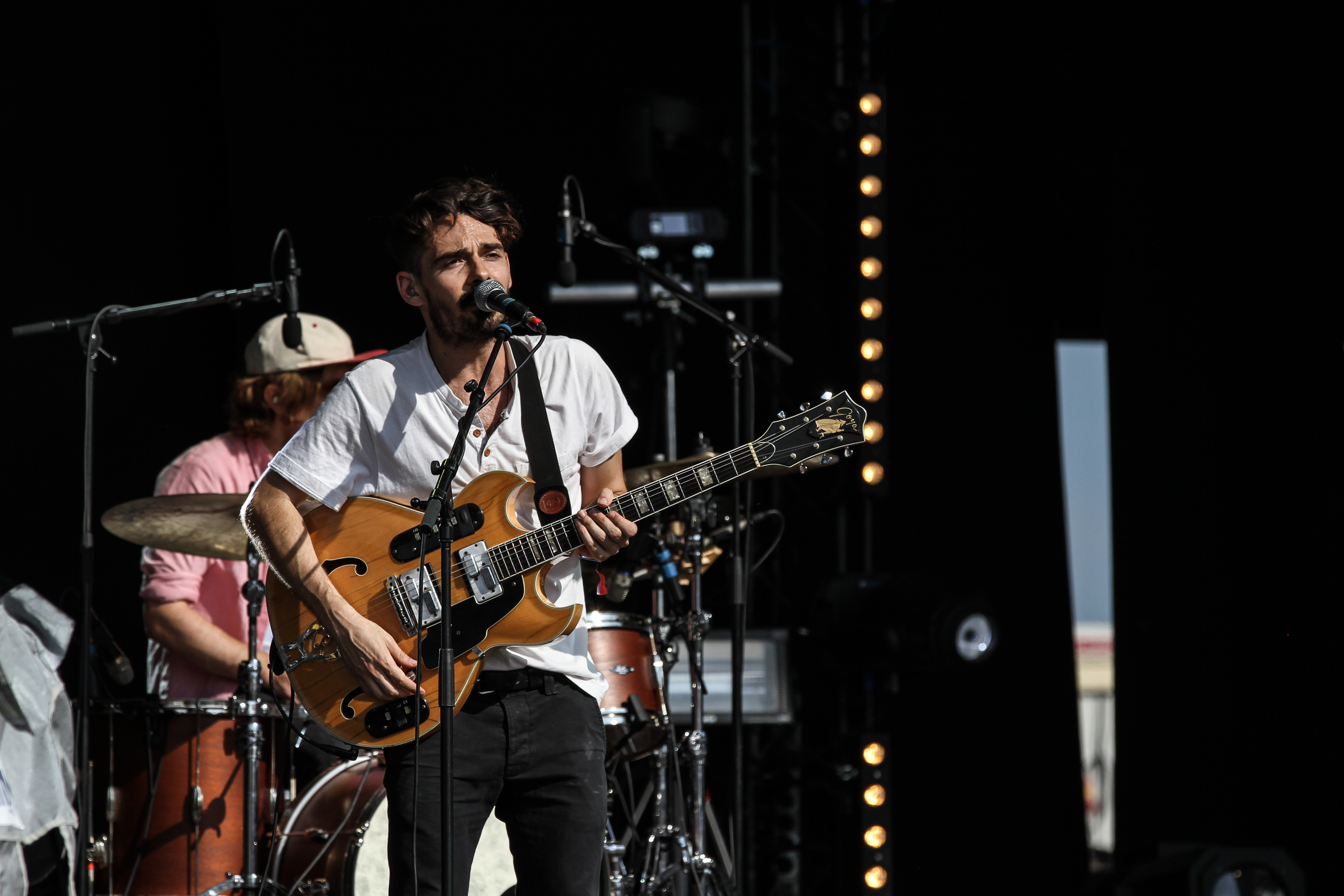
Taylor Rice on vocals and guitar

== Discography ==
=== Albums ===
==== Studio albums ====
List of studio albums, with selected chart positions
Title	Details	Peak chart positions									
Title	Details	US	US Rock	AUS Hit.	BEL (FL)	BEL (WA)	IRL	NED	SWE	UK	UK Indie
Gorilla Manor	Released: November 2, 2009 (UK) February 16, 2010 (US); Label: Infectious, Frenchkiss	160	47	—	51	—	—	72	—	—	30
Hummingbird	Released: January 29, 2013; Label: Infectious, Frenchkiss	12	4	19	23	91	32	60	56	58	6
Sunlit Youth	Released: September 9, 2016; Label: Loma Vista, Infectious, Hostess	23	8	16	86	92	—	165	—	— (Note: Sunlit Youth did not enter the UK Albums Chart, but peaked at number 11 on the UK Records Store Chart.)	11
Violet Street	Released: April 26, 2019; Label: Loma Vista	— (Note: Violet Street did not enter the US Billboard 200, but peaked at number 51 on the US Billboard Top Album Sales Chart.)	— (Note: Violet Street did not enter the US Billboard Top Rock Albums Chart, but peaked at number 12 on the US Billboard Rock Album Sales Chart.)	—	—	—	—	—	—	— (Note: Violet Street did not enter the UK Albums Chart, but peaked at number 89 on the UK Album Sales Chart.)	—
Time Will Wait for No One	Released: July 7, 2023; Label: Loma Vista Recordings/Concord Music Group	— (Note: Time Will Wait for No One did not enter the US Billboard 200, but peaked at number 70 on the US Billboard Top Current Album Sales Chart.)	—	—	—	—	—	—	—	—	—
But I'll Wait for You	Released: April 19, 2024; Label: Loma Vista Recordings/Concord Music Group	—	—	—	—	—	—	—	—	—	—
"—" denotes a recording that did not chart or was not released in that territory.

=== EPs ===
List of EPs
Title	Details
Sour Lemon	Released: October 23, 2020; Label: Loma Vista
Music from the Pen Gala 1983	Released: November 20, 2021; Label: Loma Vista
ICYMI: CSLMI	Released: April 26, 2022; Label: UME - Global Clearing House

==== Live albums ====
List of live albums, with selected chart positions
Title	Details	Peak chart positions
Title	Details	US Indie
iTunes Session	Released: November 5, 2013; Label: Frenchkiss	39

=== Singles ===
List of singles, with selected chart positions, showing year released and album name
Title	Year	Peak chart positions							Certifications	Album
Title	Year	US AAA	US Alt.	US Rock	BEL (FL) Tip	CAN Rock	MEX Air.	UK Sales	Certifications	Album
"Sun Hands"	2009	—	—	—	—	—	—	—		Gorilla Manor
"Camera Talk"	2009	—	—	—	—	—	—	94		Gorilla Manor
"Airplanes"	2010	—	—	—	—	—	24	52		Gorilla Manor
"Wide Eyes"	2010	—	—	—	—	—	31	—	RIAA: Gold	Gorilla Manor
"Who Knows Who Cares"	2010	—	—	—	—	—	—	—		Gorilla Manor
"World News"	2010	—	—	—	—	—	—	—		Gorilla Manor
"Breakers"	2012	—	—	38	—	—	43	50		Hummingbird
"Heavy Feet"	2013	—	—	—	74	—	—	54		Hummingbird
"You & I"	2013	—	—	—	—	—	—	30		Hummingbird
"Ceilings"	2013	—	—	—	—	—	—	56		Hummingbird
"Past Lives"	2016	—	—	—	— (Note: "Past Lives" did not enter the Flanders Ultratop 50, but charted as an extra tip on the Flemish Ultratop Bubbling Under chart.)	—	—	—		Sunlit Youth
"Villainy"	2016	—	—	—	—	—	—	—		Sunlit Youth
"Fountain of Youth"	2016	—	—	—	— (Note: "Fountain of Youth" did not enter the Flanders Ultratop 50, but charted as an extra tip on the Flemish Ultratop Bubbling Under chart.)	—	—	—		Sunlit Youth
"Coins"	2016	—	—	—	—	—	—	—		Sunlit Youth
"Fountain of Youth (live)"	2016	—	—	—	—	—	—	—		30 Days, 50 Songs
"Ultralight Beam"	2016	—	—	—	—	—	—	—		Non-album singles
"I Saw You Close Your Eyes"	2017	—	—	—	—	—	—	—		Non-album singles
"The Only Heirs"	2017	—	—	—	—	—	—	—		Non-album singles
"When Am I Gonna Lose You"	2019	5	7	17	— (Note: "When Am I Gonna Lose You" did not enter the Flanders Ultratop 50, but charted as an extra tip on the Flemish Ultratop Bubbling Under chart.)	45	—	—		Violet Street
"Café Amarillo"	2019	—	—	—	—	—	—	—		Violet Street
"Tap Dancer"	2019	—	—	—	—	—	—	—		Violet Street
"Megaton Mile"	2019	—	—	—	—	—	—	—		Violet Street
"Nova"	2019	—	—	—	—	—	—	—		Non-album singles
"Dark Days" (featuring Sylvan Esso)	2020	18	—	— (Note: "Dark Days" did not enter the Hot Rock & Alternative Songs chart, but peaked at number 49 on the Rock Airplay chart.)	—	—	—	—	RIAA: Gold	Non-album singles
"Francesca" / "Weekends" (with Classixx)	2020	—	—	—	—	—	—	—		Non-album singles
"Statues in the Garden (Arras)"	2020	—	—	—	—	—	—	—		Sour Lemon
"Lemon" (featuring Sharon Van Etten)	2021	—	—	—	—	—	—	—		Sour Lemon
"Desert Snow" / "Hourglass"	2022	—	—	—	—	—	—	—		Time Will Wait for No One
"Just Before the Morning"	2022	16	—	—	—	—	—	—		Time Will Wait for No One
"NYE"	2023	32	—	—	—	—	—	—		Time Will Wait for No One
"Paradise"	2023	—	—	—	—	—	—	—		Time Will Wait for No One
"April"	2024	—	—	—	—	—	—	—		But I'll Wait for You
"Alpharetta"	2024	—	—	—	—	—	—	—		But I'll Wait for You
"—" denotes a recording that did not chart or was not released in that territory.
