= Kate Mara =

American actress (born 1983)

- Mara in 2026
- Born: Kate Rooney Mara; February 27, 1983 (age 43); Bedford, New York, U.S.
- Occupation: Actress
- Years active: 1997–present
- Spouse: Jamie Bell (m. 2017)
- Children: 2
- Relatives: Rooney Mara (sister)
- Family: Rooney; Mara

Kate Rooney Mara (/ˈmɛərə/ MAIR-ə; born February 27, 1983) is an American actress. She is known for her work in television, playing reporter Zoe Barnes in the Netflix political drama House of Cards (2013–2014; 2016), computer analyst Shari Rothenberg in the Fox thriller series 24 (2006), wronged mistress Hayden McClaine in the FX miniseries American Horror Story: Murder House (2011), Patty Bowes in the first season of the FX drama series Pose (2018), and a teacher involved with an underage student in the FX miniseries A Teacher (2020).

Mara made her film debut in Random Hearts (1999). She has since appeared in Brokeback Mountain (2005), We Are Marshall (2006), Shooter (2007), Transsiberian (2008), Stone of Destiny (2008), The Open Road (2009), Ironclad (2011), Transcendence (2014), The Martian (2015), Fantastic Four (2015), Morgan (2016), Megan Leavey (2017), My Days of Mercy (2017), Chappaquiddick (2018), and Friendship (2024).

== Early life ==
Kate Mara was born on February 27, 1983, in Bedford, New York. Her parents are Timothy Christopher Mara, an NFL scout and vice president of the New York Giants for player evaluation, and Kathleen McNulty Mara (née Rooney). She is the second of four siblings, with an older brother, Daniel; a younger sister, the actress Patricia "Rooney"; and a younger brother, Conor. Her ancestry is mostly Irish, a quarter Italian, and smaller amounts of German and French-Canadian. Her father is one of 11 children. Through him she has 20 aunts and uncles and 40 cousins.

She is a great-granddaughter of both New York Giants founder Tim Mara and Pittsburgh Steelers founder Art Rooney. Her mother's side of the family has held ownership in the Steelers since its formation in 1933, and her father's side of the family has held ownership in the Giants since its formation in 1925. Her paternal grandparents were Wellington Mara and Ann Mara. Wellington co-owned the Giants from 1959 until his death in 2005, and was succeeded by his son (Kate Mara's uncle) John Mara, who is now president, CEO, and co-owner of the team. Kate Mara's maternal grandfather, Timothy James "Tim" Rooney, has operated Yonkers Raceway in Yonkers, New York, since 1972. Her granduncle Dan Rooney, chairman of the Steelers, was the United States Ambassador to Ireland and co-founded the charitable organization The Ireland Funds. Her first cousin once removed Art Rooney II is president and co-owner of the Steelers.

Mara began acting at the age of nine in a school musical. She attended several youth theater-arts schools and appeared in community theater and in school plays. In an Esquire magazine interview, she says she was "painfully shy" growing up and had only one friend.

== Career ==
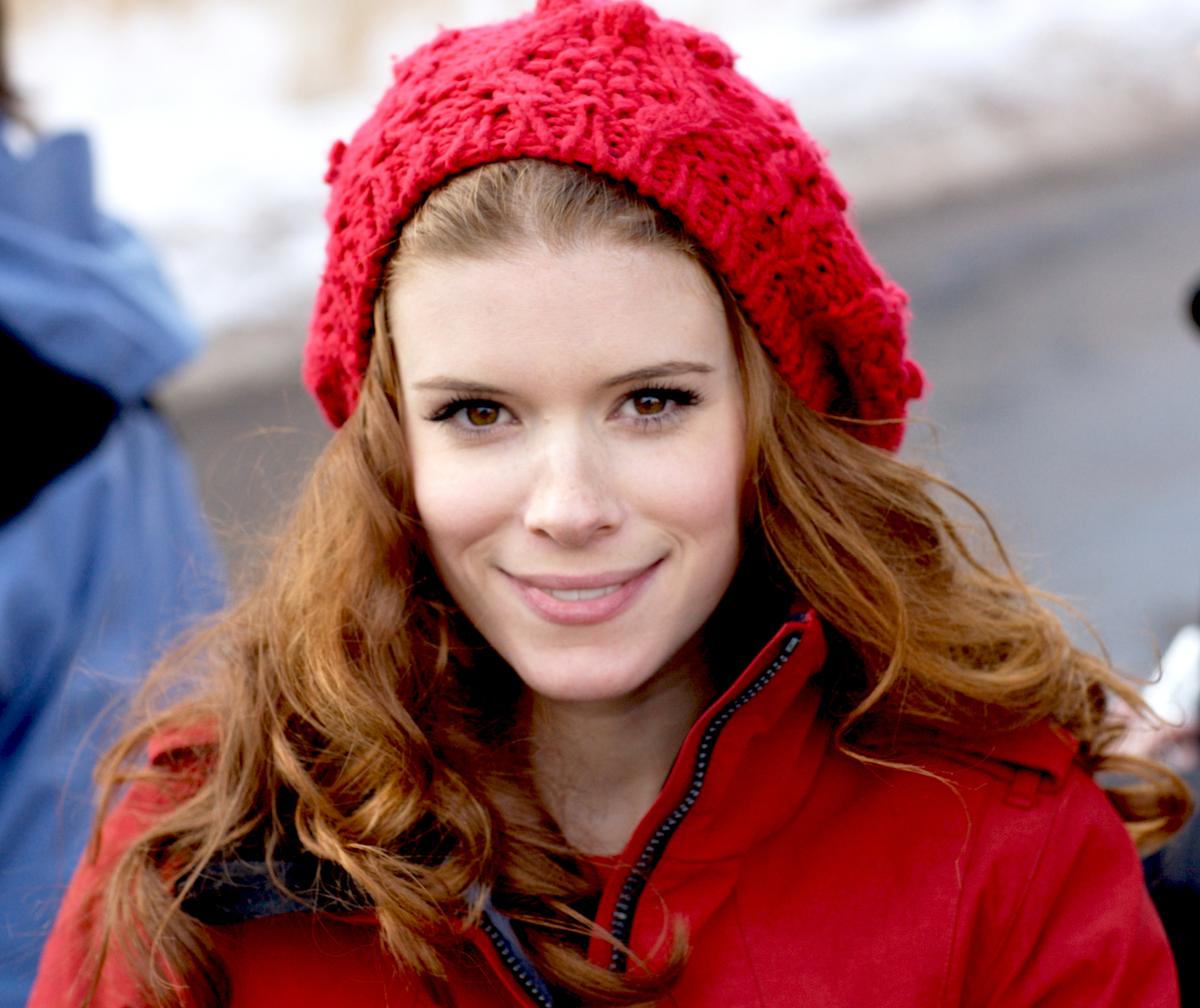
Mara at the 2008 Sundance Film Festival

=== Television and stage ===
Mara's first recurring television role was in the FX drama Nip/Tuck in a love triangle with her boyfriend Matt McNamara (John Hensley) and another cheerleader (Sophia Bush). Mara also appeared on Cold Case, Boston Public, CSI: Miami and CSI: Crime Scene Investigation.

Mara was cast as the lead in the 2004 The WB pilot Prodigy, about a teenage child prodigy. She had a recurring role on the WB's Jack & Bobby in 2005 and a five-episode arc on the Fox TV series 24 in 2006, playing computer analyst Shari Rothenberg. Mara joined the cast of the HBO comedy-drama Entourage for the series' sixth season in 2009. She played Brittany, Eric "E" Murphy (Kevin Connolly)'s assistant at his talent-management company and a potential love interest. Mara filmed four episodes for the series in 2009. In 2011, she guest starred on the FX horror series American Horror Story, as Hayden McClaine, a student who becomes Dr. Ben Harmon (Dylan McDermott)'s dead mistress, a spirit trapped in the Harmon house. Mara was offered the role by Ryan Murphy, her former producer on Nip/Tuck.

In 2012, Mara joined the cast of House of Cards, playing the part of Zoe Barnes, an intrepid reporter from Washington, D.C. who becomes a major ally to Frank Underwood by leaking stories that undermine his rivals. She filmed a second season of the series, which was released on February 14, 2014. On July 10, 2014, she was nominated for the Primetime Emmy Award for Outstanding Guest Actress in a Drama Series. She played a teacher who begins an illicit relationship with an underage student in the FX miniseries A Teacher (2020). For it, she received an Independent Spirit Award nomination for Best New Scripted Series as an executive producer.

Mara's stage debut, in 2003, was at the Williamstown Theatre Festival in John Guare's Landscape of the Body with Lili Taylor. Mara starred in The Alice Complex, a play by Peter Barr Nickowitz, at Dixon Place in New York City in 2005, and at the Blank Theatre in Los Angeles in 2006. The production co-starred Tony Award-winner Harriet Sansom Harris. In 2006, she told WFAN radio that theater is a "dream" because it was "all I really wanted to do as a kid. I didn't care about movies or TV, I just wanted to do Broadway".

=== Film ===
Mara made her film debut in Random Hearts in 1999, directed by Sydney Pollack. She played Jessica Chandler, the daughter of a congresswoman (Kristin Scott Thomas). She next appeared in the Sundance Film Festival award-winning films Joe the King (1999) and Tadpole (2002), alongside Sigourney Weaver. Mara co-starred in Peoples (2004), a drama and coming-of-age story filmed in Louisville, Kentucky. She starred in the direct-to-video horror film Urban Legends: Bloody Mary and appeared with Noah Wyle and Illeana Douglas in the 2005 film The Californians. Her supporting role as the daughter of Heath Ledger's character in the Oscar-winning film Brokeback Mountain that year brought her more widespread critical notice.

Mara signed with the William Morris Agency, and was included on the New York Daily News's list of "10 young actors who have a shot at making it big" at the start of 2006. She appeared in Zoom that year as Summer Jones (aka Wonder), a 16-year-old girl with telekinetic and empathic powers. She next appeared in We Are Marshall, starring Matthew McConaughey, which recalled the aftermath of the 1970 Marshall University plane crash that took the lives of most of the football team. Mara played cheerleader Annie Cantrell.

In 2007, she appeared in the comedy Full of It with Ryan Pinkston for New Line Cinema. The film later aired on television as Big Liar on Campus. Mara was also featured in an advertising campaign for clothing retailer Gap called, "khakis with attitude." She appeared in Shooter, a thriller about a master sniper portrayed by Mark Wahlberg, lured out of retirement to prevent an assassination. Mara played a Kentucky widow, Sarah Fenn, adopting a southern accent for the role.

Also in 2007, she finished her work in the film Transsiberian, by Brad Anderson, which takes place on the Trans-Siberian Railway that runs from China to Moscow. She spent three months shooting the thriller in Vilnius, Lithuania, starting in December 2006. The film also shot on location in Beijing and Russia. Mara played Abby, a 20-year-old runaway from Seattle.

Mara starred in the 2008 film Stone of Destiny, written and directed by Charles Martin Smith, about the theft of the Stone of Scone on Christmas Day, 1950. Mara played Kay Matheson, one of four students that removed the stone in a Scottish nationalist plot. The period adventure-comedy co-starred Billy Boyd, Robert Carlyle and Charlie Cox. Filming began in June 2007 in locations around Glasgow. Mara felt lucky and proud to play a role that was important to people's heritage. She stayed near the Botanic Gardens in the city's West End while filming. The film was shown at the Edinburgh and Toronto International Film Festivals.

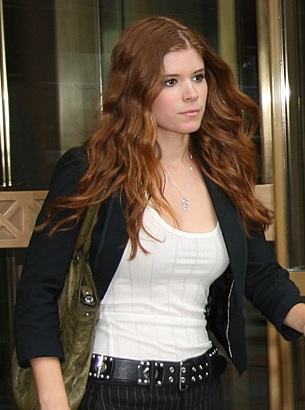
Mara at the 2008 Toronto International Film Festival

In December 2008, Mara appeared in T Takes: Brooklyn 09, a series of six improvised short films directed by Brody Baker. She starred in The Open Road as Lucy.

In 2009, Mara filmed the independent comedy Peep World, starring Michael C. Hall, Sarah Silverman and Rainn Wilson, and joined the cast of Marvel's Iron Man 2, making a cameo appearance as a U.S. Marshal who serves Tony Stark a subpoena. Mara shot the ensemble romantic comedy Happythankyoumoreplease in New York City in July 2009. She plays a waitress and aspiring singer named Mississippi, in a story about six single New Yorkers in their 20s. The film was written and directed by actor Josh Radnor (How I Met Your Mother). The film won the U.S. Dramatic Audience Award at the 2010 Sundance Film Festival. In 2010, Mara played hiker Kristi Moore in the survival drama 127 Hours, a true story directed by Danny Boyle about Aron Ralston, a climber trapped while mountaineering in Utah.

Mara appeared in Ironclad (2011), which tells the story of the siege of Rochester Castle by King John in 1215. It is her first film where she speaks in an English accent. Mara appeared in the short film Ten Year, produced by Channing Tatum, to attract financing for a feature film. The full-length feature went into production in Albuquerque in January 2010, with Mara starring in a large ensemble cast film about a 10-year high school reunion. In 2012, Mara starred in Stefan Ruzowitzky's thriller Deadfall with Eric Bana and Olivia Wilde. In 2013, Mara starred in the video for Broken Bells's song "Holding On for Life". In 2014, she appeared in Transcendence, starring Johnny Depp and directed by Wally Pfister.

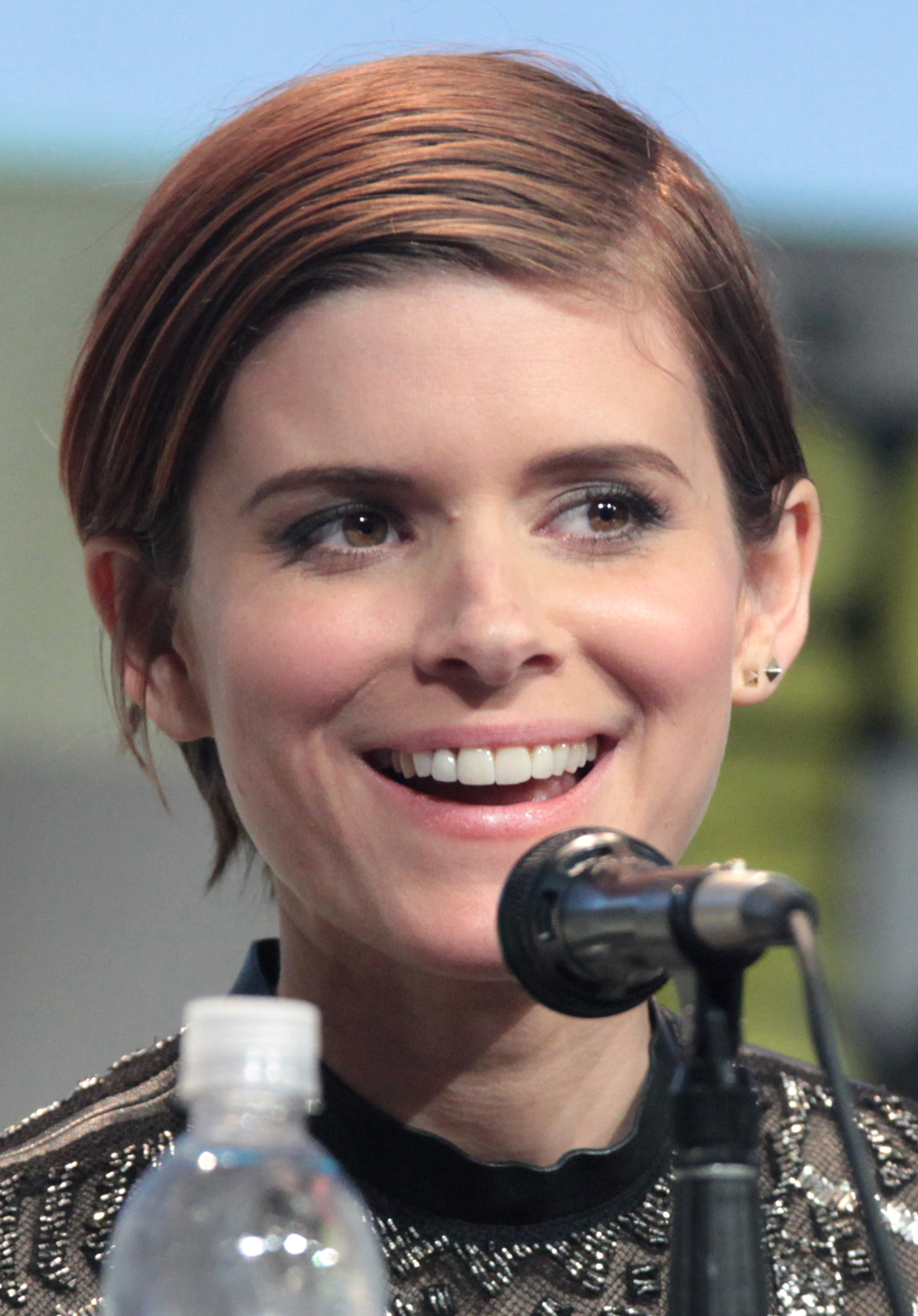
Mara at the 2015 San Diego Comic-Con promoting Fantastic Four

In 2015, she played Sue Storm, the Invisible Woman, in the Fantastic Four reboot. In that year, she also had a supporting role as astronaut Beth Johanssen in director Ridley Scott's film The Martian. She also starred as Ashley Smith in the movie Captive.

In 2017, Mara starred in Megan Leavey, playing Megan Leavey, a real-life U.S. marine who bonded with her military working dog. The film was directed by Gabriela Cowperthwaite, and released on June 9, 2017.

Mara starred alongside Elliot Page in My Days of Mercy, which she co-produced.

Mara and her sister Rooney Mara co-star, for the first time, in the upcoming movie Bucking Fastard, directed by Werner Herzog.

== Personal life ==
Mara was in a relationship with Max Minghella between 2010 and 2014. In 2014, she had a brief relationship with Elliot Page before beginning a relationship with her Fantastic Four co-star Jamie Bell in 2015. In January 2017, the couple was engaged. On July 17, 2017, the couple announced that they had married. As a result, Mara became the stepmother to Bell's son from his marriage to Evan Rachel Wood. In May 2019, the couple's daughter was born. On November 17, 2022, Mara announced on Instagram that she had given birth to a son the week before. Mara lives in Los Angeles and Manhattan.

Mara credits her vegan diet and regular workouts for keeping fit. "I'm a massive animal lover, too," she has said. "Being vegan has been so good for me. I never felt better." Mara is one of the faces of the Humane Society of the United States. In 2015, she was featured in one of its campaign videos to promote Meatless Monday.

As a descendant of the owners of the New York Giants and Pittsburgh Steelers, Mara is a fan of both teams; she joked, "If I'm mad at my mom, I root for the Giants, and if I'm pissed at my dad, I root for the Steelers." This relationship contributed to her role in We Are Marshall. Mara has sung the national anthem at both teams' games, and since she missed the Steelers' 2006 victory at Super Bowl XL due to work, her contracts have stipulated that she may attend if either team goes to the Super Bowl. She was in attendance for the Giants' victory in Super Bowl XLII, the Steelers' victory the next year in Super Bowl XLIII, and the Giants' victory in Super Bowl XLVI.

== Filmography ==
=== Film ===
Year	Title	Role	Notes	Refs.
1999	Joe the King	Allyson		
1999	Random Hearts	Jessica Chandler		
2002	Tadpole	Miranda Spear		
2004	Time Well Spent	Girl	Short film	
2004	Peoples	Jessica		
2004	Prodigy			
2005	Urban Legends: Bloody Mary	Samantha "Sam" Owens	Direct-to-video	
2005	Brokeback Mountain	Alma Del Mar Jr. (age 19)		
2005	The Californians	Zoe Tripp		
2006	Zoom	Summer Jones / Wonder		
2006	Fireflies	Taylor		
2006	We Are Marshall	Annie Cantrell		
2007	Full of It	Annie Dray		
2007	Shooter	Sarah Fenn		
2008	Transsiberian	Abby		
2008	Stone of Destiny	Kay Matheson		
2009	Big Guy	Kate	Short film	
2009	The Open Road	Lucy		
2010	Happythankyoumoreplease	Mississippi		
2010	Iron Man 2	U.S. Marshal		
2010	127 Hours	Kristi Moore		
2010	Peep World	Meg		
2011	Ironclad	Isabel		
2011	Queen of Hearts	Queen of Hearts	Short film	
2011	10 Years	Elise		
2012	Deadfall	Hanna		
2013	After the Disco Part One: Angel and the Fool	Helen	Short film	
2013	After the Disco Part Two: Holding On for Life	Helen	Short film	
2014	Transcendence	Bree		
2014	Tiny Detectives	Detective Kate	Short film	
2014	Lennon or McCartney	Herself	Short film	
2015	The Heyday of the Insensitive Bastards	Lisa		
2015	Fantastic Four	Susan Storm / Invisible Woman		
2015	Man Down	Natalie Drummer		
2015	The Martian	Beth Johanssen		
2015	Captive	Ashley Smith		
2016	Morgan	Lee Weathers		
2017	Megan Leavey	Megan Leavey		
2017	My Days of Mercy	Mercy Bromage	Also producer	
2018	Chappaquiddick	Mary Jo Kopechne		
2022	Call Jane	Lana		
2024	Friendship	Tami Waterman		
2025	The Dutchman	Lula	Also executive producer	
2025	The Astronaut	Sam Walker		
2025	Easy's Waltz	Lucy		
2026	Bucking Fastard	Jean Holbrooke		
TBA	Trust the Man †	TBA	Post-production	

=== Television ===
Year	Title	Role	Notes	Refs.
1997	Law & Order	Jenna Erlich	Episode: "Shadow"	
2000	Madigan Men	Julie	Episode: "White Knight"	
2000	Ed	Kelly Kovacs	Episode: "Pretty Girls and Waffles"	
2001	Law & Order: Special Victims Unit	Lori	Episode: "Pixies"	
2003	Everwood	Kate Morris	2 episodes	
2003	Nip/Tuck	Vanessa Bartholomew	4 episodes	
2003	Cold Case	Jill Shelby	Episode: "Look Again"	
2003	Boston Public	Helena Gelbke	Episode: "Chapter Seventy-Five"	
2004	CSI: Miami	Stephanie Brooks	Episode: "Murder in a Flash"	
2004	CSI: Crime Scene Investigation	Janelle Macklin	Episode: "Formalities"	
2005	Jack & Bobby	Katie	6 episodes	
2006	24	Shari Rothenberg	5 episodes (season 5)	
2009	Entourage	Brittany	4 episodes	
2009	T Takes	Kate	2 episodes	
2011	American Horror Story: Murder House	Hayden McClaine	8 episodes	
2012	Tron: Uprising	Perl	Voice; 2 episodes	
2013–2014; 2016	House of Cards	Zoe Barnes	14 episodes Nominated – Primetime Emmy Award for Outstanding Guest Actress in a Drama Series (2014)	
2014	Robot Chicken	Various voices	2 episodes	
2015	Moonbeam City	Chrysalis Tate	Voice; 10 episodes	
2018	Pose	Patty Bowes	6 episodes	
2020	A Teacher	Claire Wilson	Miniseries; also producer	
2023	Class of '09	Ashley Poet	Miniseries; Main role	
2023	Black Mirror	Lana	Episode: "Beyond the Sea"	
2025	Invincible	Becky Duvall	Voice; Episode: "All I Can Say Is I'm Sorry"	
2026	Imperfect Women	Nancy	8 episodes	

=== Podcasts ===
Year	Title	Role	Notes	Refs.
2022	The Big Lie	Honor Bergin	Voice role	
2022	Koz	Becky Kozlowski	Voice role	

=== Music videos ===
Year	Title	Artist(s)	Role	Refs.
2013	"Holding On for Life"	Broken Bells	Helen	
2019	"When Am I Gonna Lose You"	Local Natives	Rich lonely Los Angeles woman	
