= TransSiberian (film) =

- Theatrical release poster
- Directed by: Brad Anderson
- Written by: Brad Anderson; Will Conroy
- Produced by: Julio Fernández
- Starring: Woody Harrelson; Emily Mortimer; Kate Mara; Eduardo Noriega; Thomas Kretschmann; Ben Kingsley
- Cinematography: Xavi Giménez
- Edited by: Jaume Martí
- Music by: Alfonso Vilallonga
- Production companies: Castelao Producciones; UFA; Future Films UK
- Distributed by: Universum Film/24 Bilder (Germany); Icon Film Distribution (United Kingdom); Filmax (Spain)
- Release dates: 18 January 2008 (Sundance); 18 July 2008 (Limited); 5 September 2008
- Running time: 111 minutes
- Countries: Germany; United Kingdom; Spain; Lithuania
- Languages: English; Russian
- Budget: $15 million
- Box office: $5.9 million

TransSiberian is a 2008 psychological thriller film directed by Brad Anderson and written by Anderson and Will Conroy. It stars Woody Harrelson and Emily Mortimer as an American couple whose journey on the Trans-Siberian Railway leads them to a trail of deception and murder. Kate Mara, Eduardo Noriega, Thomas Kretschmann and Ben Kingsley appear in supporting roles.

After premiering at the 2008 Sundance Film Festival in January, the film received a limited release in the United States on July 18, 2008. It received positive reviews, with praise for its story and atmosphere, and grossed $5.9 million at the box office.

== Plot ==
An American couple, Roy and Jessie, take the train from Beijing to Moscow on their return home from a Christian mission in China. Roy befriends their cabin mates, a Spanish man, Carlos, and his Seattle-born girlfriend, Abby. Jessie is warier than her husband and does not share his unguarded warmth to the strangers, but Carlos shows Jessie his souvenir matryoshka dolls.

When Roy misses the train in Irkutsk while sightseeing, Jessie is alone with Carlos and Abby. When she alights the train at Ilanskaya to wait for Roy, Carlos and Abby also get off, claiming Jessie would be unsafe alone. In a restaurant, Jessie sees a doll nearly identical to those of Carlos. Abby is upset when she mentions this and goes to bed. Jessie begs Carlos not to involve Abby in his activities.

The next morning, Carlos comes to Jessie's room, tells her his shower is broken and asks to use hers. Jessie receives a summons from reception and leaves Carlos in her room. At reception, she receives a call confirming that Roy will join her, and Carlos convinces her to go on a trip into the wilderness, where they find a ruined church.

Jessie, an amateur photographer, starts taking pictures. When Carlos makes advances, she first refuses, but they then begin kissing. Jessie quickly changes her mind and asks Carlos to stop but he continues, becoming aggressive and chasing after her. She becomes terrified and hits him with a fence post, killing him. Jessie returns to the station in a state of shock, shortly afterwards Roy's train arrives and she re-joins him. Roy assumes her emotional greeting is due to her anguish over his delay. As the train pulls away, Jessie notices Abby through the window, running alongside the train searching hopelessly for Carlos.

Ilya Grinko, a narcotics officer whom Roy befriended, is their new cabin mate. Jessie is shocked to find Carlos' dolls in her suitcase and realizes that he hid them when he was in her room. Grinko accompanies them for dinner and talks about his job, Jessie realizes that Carlos was smuggling heroin, and later unsuccessfully tries to get rid of the dolls when the others are asleep. She panics when Grinko becomes suspicious. When she returns to her cabin to find Roy examining the dolls, she breaks down and explains their origins, though without telling Roy about Carlos' death. They give Grinko the dolls, who seems satisfied they were uninvolved.

The next morning, they awake to discover that most of the carriages have departed with the other passengers; only Grinko and his partner Kolzak Yushenkov remain. They stop the train in the middle of nowhere and take Jessie and Roy to an abandoned military bunker, where Abby is being tortured. Grinko is bribed by a Russian drug lord and explains that Carlos stole heroin and money from the drug lord who wants both. Grinko tells Jessie that Abby is not the "good girl" Jessie thought: she recruited Carlos, was responsible for another's death and is trying to cheat the drug lord. Jessie disbelieves Grinko because Carlos told her Abby was innocent. Abby continues to be tortured in the presence of Jessie and Roy.

Jessie and Roy escape and return to the train, where they find the conductor, who works for Grinko. Roy kills him. They escape with the train as Roy, a railway enthusiast, knows how to operate it. The train slows down and Grinko and Kolzak re-board the train. When they question Jessie again about Carlos' whereabouts, holding her and Roy at gunpoint, Jessie admits she killed Carlos. Kolzak does not believe her, but at that moment, the train collides with a troop-carrying train. With the army on the way, Grinko shoots Kolzak to maintain his cover. The couple are arrested, while Grinko escapes.

In Moscow, U.S. officials visit Jessie and Roy. Through a photograph Jessie took of Grinko and his associates, the officials believe they can shut down the drug operation. They reveal Carlos' criminal history and believe Abby just got mixed up with the wrong crowd. When signing statements, Jessie does not confess she killed Carlos, although Roy may have heard her admit to this. Touring Moscow, Jessie insists on talking to Abby in the hospital.

The final scene shows Abby finding Carlos' body, following instructions that Jessie had earlier given her. Abby takes a fortune in stolen money from his jacket.

== Cast ==
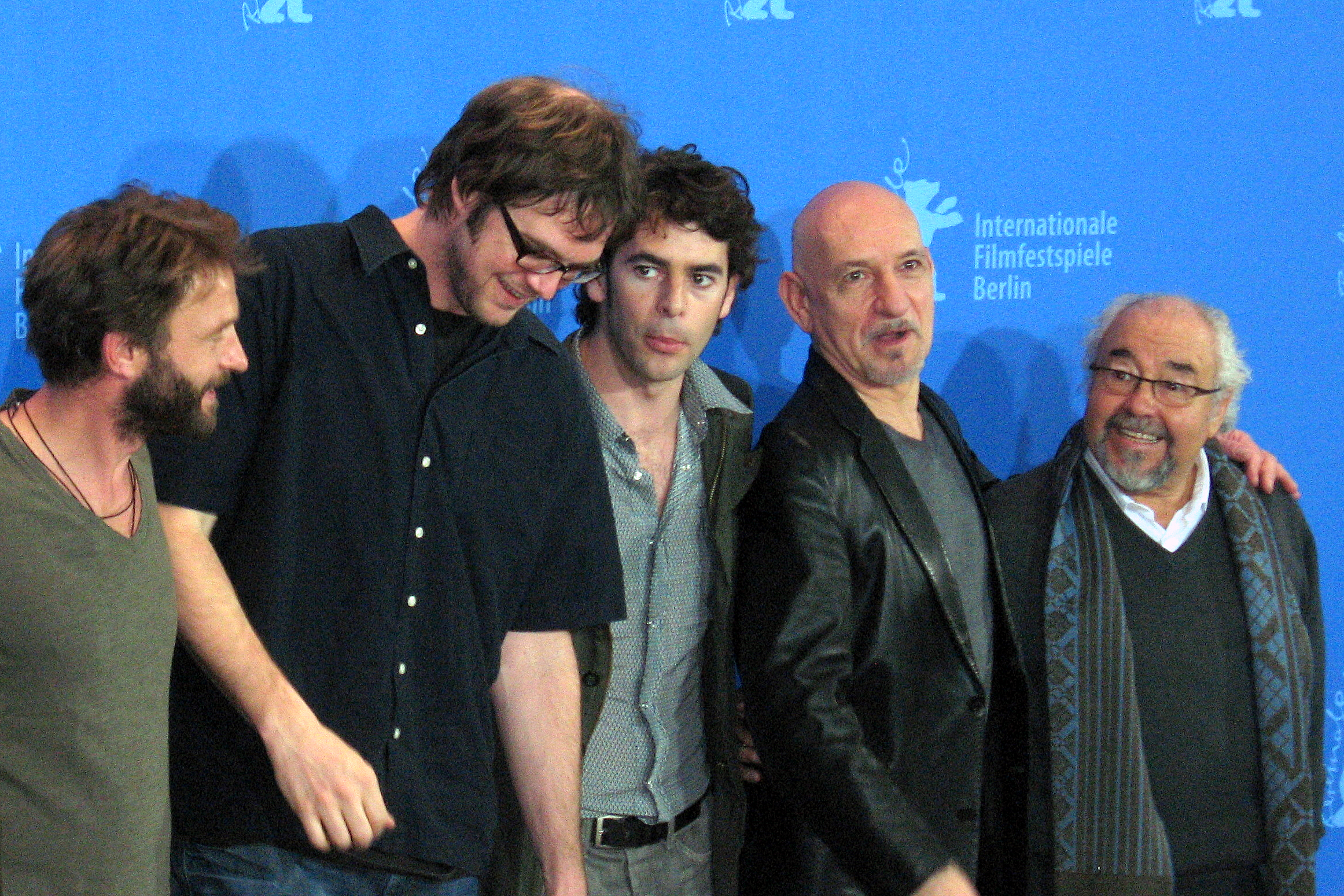
Thomas Kretschmann, Brad Anderson, Eduardo Noriega, Ben Kingsley, and Julio Fernández at press conference for the film at Berlinale 2008.

- Woody Harrelson as Roy
- Emily Mortimer as Jessie
- Ben Kingsley as Ilya Grinko
- Kate Mara as Abby
- Eduardo Noriega as Carlos
- Thomas Kretschmann as Kolzak Yushenkov
- Étienne Chicot as French passenger.

== Production ==
The film was shot on location in Lithuania. The government gave the filmmakers 40 kilometers of track. It had a production budget of $15 million. Mortimer agreed to do the film two days before filming and began without having time to finish reading the script.

== Reception ==
=== Critical response ===
The film received positive reviews from critics. On Rotten Tomatoes, it has a 91% score based on reviews from 101 critics, with an average rating of 7.20/10. The site's critical consensus states: "Traditional in form yet effective in execution, this taut thriller updates the 'danger on a train' scenario with atmospheric sense." On Metacritic, the film has a weighted average rating of 72 based on reviews from 21 critics, indicating "generally favorable reviews".

Roger Ebert of the Chicago Sun-Times gave the film 3.5 out of four and praised the film, saying it builds "true fear and suspense." Scott Tobias at The A.V. Club gave it a B+. Kirk Honeycutt of The Hollywood Reporter wrote: "This vigorous, fast-paced tale that entwines plot with character and psychology set against an incredibly exotic backdrop certainly has boxoffice potential as dynamic as its storytelling."

=== Box office ===
The film grossed $2,206,405 in the United States and Canada and a further $3,720,005 in other countries for a worldwide total of $5,926,410.
