= Time Will Wait for No One =

2023 studio album by Local Natives

Studio album by Local Natives
- Released: July 7, 2023
- Length: 34:09
- Label: Loma Vista; Concord
- Producer: John Congleton; Michael Harris; Local Natives; Danny Reisch

Local Natives chronology
Sour Lemon (2021)	Time Will Wait for No One (2023)	But I'll Wait for You (2024)

Singles from Time Will Wait for No One
- 1. "Desert Snow" / "Hourglass" Released: July 22, 2022; 2. "Just Before the Morning" Released: October 12, 2022; 3. "NYE" Released: May 9, 2023; 4. "Paradise" Released: June 27, 2023

Time Will Wait for No One is the fifth studio album by American indie rock band Local Natives, released on July 7, 2023, by Loma Vista Recordings and Concord. It marks the first part of a "large body of music" by the band; a companion album, But I'll Wait for You, was released in April 2024.

== Background ==
Local Natives worked on the album while they were enduring a "time of metamorphosis" as individuals. On August 14, 2021, as they were halfway through creating their fifth album, the band performed at Greek Theatre in Los Angeles. Their first live performance in almost two years due to the COVID-19 pandemic, the band called it "one of the most emotional concerts of our lives". It occurred as members were confronting parenthood, isolation, loss, and identity crisis. After the performance, the band felt unsure of their future and were "on the verge of a collapse". Experiencing their longest separation since they formed, the members were forced to redefine how to work together again. They worked toward developing deeper trust and honesty. As a result, the band found themselves in a prolific period where they wrote more music than they ever have before. The album was recorded with producers John Congleton, Michael Harris and Danny Reisch.

== Release ==
The band released the double single A-side single "Desert Snow" and "Hourglass" on July 22, 2022. "Just Before the Morning" was released on October 12, 2022. The album's lead single, "NYE", was released simultaneously with the album announcement on May 9, 2023. "Paradise" was released as the final single on June 27, 2023. Time Will Wait for No One was released by Loma Vista on July 7, 2023.

== Critical reception ==
Professional ratings
Review scores
Source	Rating
AllMusic	4/5 stars
Clash	8/10
The Line of Best Fit	9/10

Writing for AllMusic, Matt Collar rated the album four out of five stars and wrote that the album's sound evoked "the sultry, post-hippie soul and soft rock of artists like Boz Scaggs and Robbie Dupree" with "a contemporary edge".

== Track listing ==
All lyrics are written by Kelcey Ayer, Ryan Hahn, and Taylor Rice, except "Hourglass" written by Ayer, Hahn, Rice, Nik Ewing, and Matthew Frazier; all music is composed by Ayer, Ewing, Hahn, Frazier, and Rice.

Time Will Wait for No One track listing
No.	Title	Producer(s)	Length
1.	"Time Will Wait for No One"	John Congleton; Local Natives	1:12
2.	"Just Before the Morning"	Local Natives; Michael Harris; Danny Reisch^{[a]}	3:34
3.	"Empty Mansions"	Congleton; Local Natives	3:25
4.	"Desert Snow"	Harris	3:35
5.	"Paper Lanterns"	Congleton; Local Natives	3:51
6.	"Featherweight"	Congleton; Local Natives	3:34
7.	"Hourglass"	Congleton	3:57
8.	"Ava"	Congleton; Local Natives	3:57
9.	"NYE"	Local Natives; Harris; Reisch	3:10
10.	"Paradise"	Congleton; Local Natives	3:54
Total length:			34:09

Note

- ^{^[a]} signifies an additional producer.

== Personnel ==
Local Natives

- Kelcey Ayer – vocals, keyboards (all tracks); bass guitar (track 4)
- Nik Ewing – bass guitar, keyboards
- Matthew Frazier – drums (all tracks), percussion (4)
- Ryan Hahn – vocals, guitar
- Taylor Rice – vocals, guitar

Technical

- Ruairi O'Flaherty – mastering (1–3, 5, 6, 8–10)
- Greg Calbi – mastering (4, 7)
- John Congleton – mixing, engineering (1, 3, 5, 6–8, 10)
- Lars Stalfors – mixing (2)
- Danny Reisch – mixing (4, 9), engineering (2, 9)
- Chris Sorem – engineering (1, 3, 5, 6, 8, 10)
- Shawn Cook – engineering (1, 3, 5, 6, 8, 10)
- Michael Harris – engineering (2, 4, 9)
- Jimmy Dixon – engineering (2)
