= Megan Leavey (film) =

- Theatrical release poster
- Directed by: Gabriela Cowperthwaite
- Written by: Pamela Gray; Annie Mumolo; Tim Lovestedt
- Produced by: Mickey Liddell; Jennifer Monroe; Pete Shilaimon
- Starring: Kate Mara; Ramón Rodríguez; Tom Felton; Bradley Whitford; Will Patton; Sam Keeley; Megan Leavey; Common; Edie Falco
- Cinematography: Lorenzo Senatore
- Edited by: Peter McNulty
- Music by: Mark Isham
- Production company: LD Entertainment
- Distributed by: Bleecker Street
- Release dates: June 5, 2017 (Yankee Stadium); June 9, 2017 (United States)
- Running time: 116 minutes
- Country: United States
- Language: English
- Box office: $14.5 million

Megan Leavey (also known as Rex) is a 2017 American biographical drama film directed by Gabriela Cowperthwaite and written by Pamela Gray, Annie Mumolo, and Tim Lovestedt, based on the true events about a young Marine named Megan Leavey and a combat dog named Rex. The film stars Kate Mara as the titular character, with Edie Falco, Common, Ramón Rodríguez, and Tom Felton in supporting roles.

The film was released on June 9, 2017, by Bleecker Street, received positive reviews and grossed $14 million.

== Plot ==
Megan Leavey is a US Marine corporal who served as a Military Police K9 handler. She was paired with military working dog Rex (E168). The pair served two deployments in Iraq together. They were first deployed to Fallujah in 2005, and then to Ramadi in 2006, where they were both wounded by an improvised explosive device. Leavey was awarded the Purple Heart and the Navy and Marine Corps Achievement Medal with a "V" device denoting heroism in combat.

In 2012, Rex developed facial palsy, which ended his bomb-sniffing duties. Leavey was able to adopt him through the intervention of Senator Chuck Schumer, around April 2012. Rex died on December 22, 2012.

== Cast ==
- Kate Mara as Megan Leavey
- Ramón Rodríguez as Cpl. Matt Morales
- Tom Felton as Sgt. Andrew Dean, a veteran dog handler
- Bradley Whitford as Bob Leavey, Megan's estranged father
- Will Patton as Jim Leavey, Megan's stepfather
- Sam Keeley as Sills
- Miguel Gomez as Gomez
- Parker Sawyers as Navy Corpsman
- Common as Gunny Martin
- Edie Falco as Jackie, Megan's overbearing mother

The real Megan Leavey is credited in the role of Female Drill Instructor #3, while Rex is portrayed by Varco, in an uncredited role.

== Production ==
On August 7, 2015, it was announced that Gabriela Cowperthwaite would be directing a film about Megan Leavey, to be portrayed by actress Kate Mara, and her military combat dog Rex. The script was written by Pamela Gray, with the help of Annie Mumolo, Tim Lovestedt, and Jordan Roberts. LD Entertainment would produce the film.

Principal photography on the film began on October 12, 2015, in Charleston, South Carolina, including scenes filmed at The Citadel, with other scenes filmed in Georgia and New York City, with extensive desert and combat scenes shot in Spain.

== Release ==
In January 2017, Bleecker Street acquired distribution rights to the film and set it for release on June 9, 2017.

=== Home media ===
The film was released on DVD and Blu-ray on September 5, 2017, from Universal Studios Home Entertainment. In the UK and Australia the film was released on DVD as Rex.

== Reception ==
=== Box office ===
Megan Leavey was released alongside It Comes at Night and The Mummy and was expected to gross around $3 million from 1,956 theaters in its opening weekend. It ended up grossing $3.8 million, finishing 8th at the box office.

=== Critical response ===
On Rotten Tomatoes, the film has an approval rating of 86% based on 104 reviews, with an average rating of 6.8/10. The site's critical consensus reads, "Megan Leavey honors its real-life subjects with a sensitive, uplifting drama whose honest emotion more than makes up for its mild approach to the story." On Metacritic, which assigns a normalized rating, the film has average score 66 out of 100, based on 25 critics, indicating "generally favorable reviews". Audiences polled by CinemaScore gave the film an average grade of "A" on an A+ to F scale.

=== Awards ===
Megan Leavey was among the 2017 films which were honored with the Truly Moving Picture Award at the Heartland Film Festival.
