= Violet Street =

Studio album by Local Natives
- Released: April 26, 2019
- Studio: CSLMI Studios and BLVD Studios in Los Angeles, California
- Length: 40:47
- Label: Loma Vista
- Producer: Shawn Everett

Local Natives chronology
Sunlit Youth (2016)	Violet Street (2019)	Sour Lemon (2020)

Singles from Sunlit Youth
- 1. "When Am I Gonna Lose You" Released: March 7, 2019; 2. "Café Amarillo" Released: 2019; 3. "Tap Dancer" Released: 2019; 4. "Megaton Mile" Released: 2019

Professional ratings
Aggregate scores
Source	Rating
Metacritic	76/100
Review scores
Source	Rating
AllMusic	4/5 stars
DIY	4/5 stars
Exclaim!	8/10
The Line of Best Fit	8.5/10
Pitchfork	7.2/10

Violet Street is the fourth studio album by American band Local Natives. It was released on April 26, 2019, through Loma Vista Recordings.

== Track listing ==
All lyrics are written by Kelcey Ayer, Ryan Hahn, and Taylor Rice. All music composed by Local Natives

No.	Title	Length
1.	"Vogue"	2:48
2.	"When Am I Gonna Lose You"	4:24
3.	"Café Amarillo"	4:23
4.	"Munich II"	0:46
5.	"Megaton Mile"	4:26
6.	"Someday Now"	5:05
7.	"Shy"	4:31
8.	"Garden of Elysian"	4:36
9.	"Gulf Shores"	5:00
10.	"Tap Dancer"	4:26

== Personnel ==
Credits adapted from LP liner notes.

Local Natives

- Taylor Rice – vocals, guitar
- Kelcey Ayer – vocals, keyboards, percussion, guitar
- Ryan Hahn – guitar, keyboards, vocals
- Matt Frazier – drums
- Nik Ewing – bass, keyboards, vocals

Production and additional personnel

- Shawn Everett - producer, mixing, engineer
- David Gaume - engineer
- Fernando Navarro - engineer
- Ivan Wayman - engineer
- Omar Yakar - engineer
- Chris Bellman - vinyl cut
- Bob Ludwig - mastering
- Sarah Neufeld - strings on "Vogue"
- Rob Moose - string arrangements on "Café Amarillo" and "Garden of Elysian"
- Olivia Walker - additional vocals on "Café Amarillo"
- Anjolee Williams - additional vocals on "Café Amarillo"
- Asdru Sierra - horns on "Shy"
- Public-Library - art direction & design
- Allister Ann - photography
- Jonathan Chu - photography
- Huy Doan - photography
- Drew Escriva - photography
- Phil Costello - artist representation/management

== Charts ==
Chart	Peak position
US Top Album Sales (Billboard)	51
US Vinyl Albums (Billboard)	11
