= Sunlit Youth =

Studio album by Local Natives
- Released: September 9, 2016
- Recorded: 2014–2016 in Thailand, Malaysia, Nicaragua, Hawaii, and Ojai, California
- Genres: Indie rock; synth-pop
- Length: 45:26
- Labels: Loma Vista (US); Infectious Music (UK/Japan); Hostess (Japan)
- Producers: Local Natives; Brian Joseph; Rob Kirwan; Catherine Marks; Little Dragon; Ryan Hahn; Lars Stalfors

Local Natives chronology
Hummingbird (2013)	Sunlit Youth (2016)	Violet Street (2019)

Singles from Sunlit Youth
- 1. "Past Lives" Released: April 29, 2016; 2. "Villainy" Released: June 6, 2016; 3. "Fountain of Youth" Released: July 7, 2016; 4. "Coins" Released: August 26, 2016

Sunlit Youth is the third studio album by American indie rock band Local Natives, released on September 9, 2016, with Loma Vista Recordings.

== Background ==
Sunlit Youth was recorded between 2014 and 2016 in Thailand, Malaysia, Nicaragua, Hawaii, and Ojai, California.

== Release ==
The album was preceded by the singles "Past Lives," "Villainy," "Fountain of Youth," and "Coins". Before its release, "Past Lives" was featured in the episode "7th" from the first season of the Netflix series Flaked, which was released on March 11, 2016.

== Goofs ==
The album has a noticeable misprint of the song "Psycho Lovers" (track #10), which on the CD is labeled as "Pyscho Lovers".

== Critical reception ==
Professional ratings
Aggregate scores
Source	Rating
Metacritic	75/100
Review scores
Source	Rating
AllMusic	3.5/5 stars
Consequence of Sound	B−
DIY	4/5 stars
Drowned in Sound	8/10
Exclaim!	7/10
The Observer	3/5 stars
Pitchfork	6.3/10
Under the Radar	5/10 stars

Sunlit Youth received generally favorable reviews from contemporary music critics. At Metacritic, which assigns a normalized rating out of 100 to reviews from mainstream critics, the album received an average score of 75, based on 12 reviews, which indicates "generally favorable reviews".

== Track listing ==
All tracks are written by Local Natives.

No.	Title	Producer(s)	Length
1.	"Villainy"	Local Natives; Brian Joseph	3:43
2.	"Past Lives"	Local Natives; Joseph	3:43
3.	"Dark Days" (featuring Nina Persson)	Local Natives; Joseph	3:01
4.	"Fountain of Youth"	Local Natives; Rob Kirwan	3:53
5.	"Masters"	Local Natives; Joseph; Catherine Marks	4:24
6.	"Jellyfish" (featuring Moses Sumney)	Local Natives; Joseph; Little Dragon; Ryan Hahn	2:50
7.	"Coins"	Local Natives; Joseph	3:58
8.	"Mother Emanuel"	Local Natives; Joseph	3:44
9.	"Ellie Alice"	Local Natives; Ryan Hahn	2:56
10.	"Psycho Lovers"	Local Natives; Joseph; Lars Stalfors	3:54
11.	"Everything All at Once"		4:10
12.	"Sea of Years"	Local Natives; Joseph	5:10
Total length:			45:26

Japanese edition bonus track
No.	Title	Length
13.	"Fountain of Youth" (Rooftop Version)

== Personnel ==
Credits adapted from the liner notes of Sunlit Youth.

Local Natives

- Taylor Rice – performer
- Kelcey Ayer – performer
- Ryan Hahn – performer
- Matt Frazier – performer
- Nik Ewing – performer

Additional personnel

- Local Natives – production
- Brian Joseph – production (1–3, 5–8, 10, 12), recording (1–7, 10–12)
- Rob Kirwan – production (4), recording (4, 8)
- Catherine Marks – production (5), recording (5)
- Little Dragon – production (6)
- Ryan Hahn – production (6, 9), recording (6, 9)
- Lars Stalfors – production (10), recording (10)
- Michael Harris – recording (1–4, 7–9)
- Shawn Everett – recording (1–3, 7, 10, 11), mixing (11)
- Dave Gaumé – recording (2, 8, 12)
- Rouble Kapoor – recording (12)
- Craig Silvey – mixing (1–5, 7, 8, 10, 12)
- Eduardo de la Paz – mixing (6, 9)
- Bob Ludwig – mastering
- Brian Roettinger – art direction, photography
- Evan McQuaid – photography
- Taylor Giali – design assistance
- Ryan Whalley – artists and repertoire (A&R)
- Phil Costello – artist management

== Charts ==
Chart (2016)	Peak position
Belgian Albums (Ultratop Flanders)	98
Belgian Albums (Ultratop Wallonia)	92
US Billboard 200	23
US Top Rock Albums (Billboard)	8
Dutch Albums (Album Top 100)	165
