= Hummingbird (Local Natives album) =

Studio album by Local Natives
- Released: January 29, 2013
- Recorded: 2011–2012
- Genre: Indie rock
- Length: 44:06
- Labels: Infectious; Frenchkiss
- Producers: Local Natives; Aaron Dessner; Raymond Richards

Local Natives chronology
Gorilla Manor (2009)	Hummingbird (2013)	Sunlit Youth (2016)

Singles from Hummingbird
- 1. "Breakers" Released: October 18, 2012; 2. "Heavy Feet" Released: January 2, 2013

Hummingbird is the second studio album by American indie rock band Local Natives, released on January 29, 2013, on Frenchkiss Records in the US, and on Infectious Records in Europe. Produced by The National guitarist Aaron Dessner, the album was preceded by the singles "Breakers" and "Heavy Feet." Hummingbird reached #12 on the Billboard Top 200. The song "Mt. Washington" was also featured in the 2015 video game Life Is Strange.

== Background and recording ==
In 2011, bass guitarist Andy Hamm departed from the band, with the remaining members deciding to continue as a four-piece. Regarding his departure, vocalist and keyboardist Kelcey Ayer stated, "Parting with Andy was really hard for us," while vocalist and guitarist Taylor Rice elaborated, stating, "It definitely put us in an uncomfortable place, so that we could try new things. With the first record, we were so concerned with making sure we could do everything live, but with this one there was a cool kind of freedom to be like, 'Let's just try stuff.'"

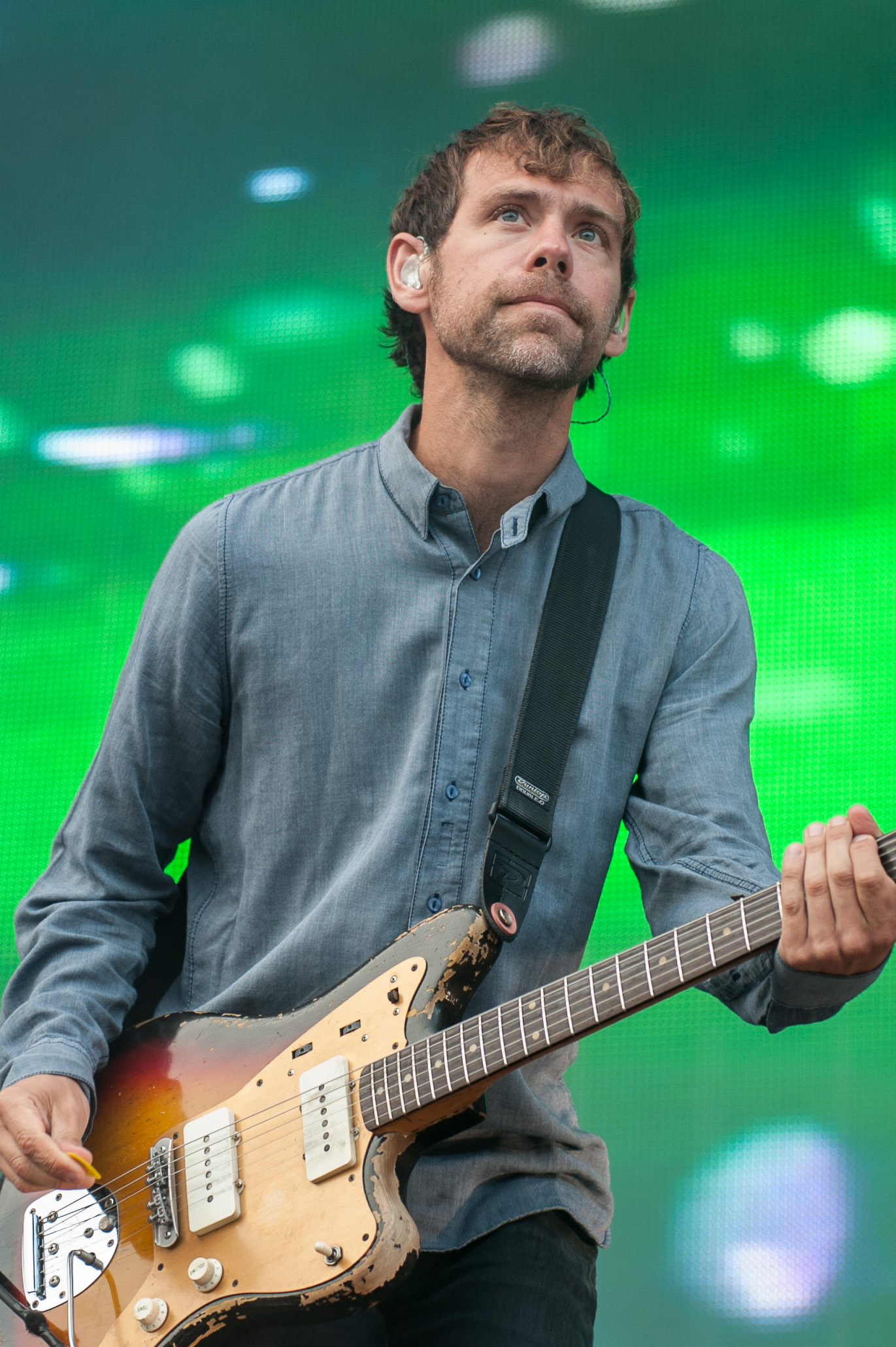
Aaron Dessner, who produced the album.

While on tour with The National, the band became close with guitarist Aaron Dessner, who subsequently asked if he could produce their next studio album. Drummer Matt Frazier noted, "One night, after maybe drinking a little bit too much, he was like, 'Maybe I should work with you guys.' We were like, 'Sure, buddy.' After meeting with all these other producers, it just seemed like we should work with somebody we really get along with and respect as a songwriter." The band relocated to Dessner's home in New York City, with vocalist and keyboardist Kelcey Ayer, stating "It was awesome because we stayed upstairs on the two top floors, and he and his family are downstairs, and the studio is in the back. It's this really tiny space, but it was so convenient to us."

== Writing and composition ==
The album's lyrical content was inspired by the recent death of Kelcey Ayer's mother and the departure of bassist Andy Hamm, with Ayer noting, "[My mother's passing] was definitely really hard, [that] and the Andy thing and there were also relationship issues and weird stuff that impacted the record and the mood of it and what we sang about. We didn’t set out to make a darker or sadder record, but we always write, for the most part, based on our experiences, so it’s a kind of window into the last few years."

== Critical reception ==
Professional ratings
Aggregate scores
Source	Rating
AnyDecentMusic?	7.5/10
Metacritic	77/100
Review scores
Source	Rating
AllMusic	3.5/5 stars
The A.V. Club	B−
Entertainment Weekly	B
The Guardian	4/5 stars
The Independent	4/5 stars
NME	8/10
Pitchfork	8.1/10
Q	4/5 stars
Rolling Stone	3.5/5 stars
Spin	8/10

Hummingbird received positive reviews from critics. At Metacritic, which assigns a normalized rating out of 100 to reviews from mainstream critics, the album received an average score of 77, based on 32 reviews, which indicates "generally favorable reviews".

Philip Cosores of Paste praised the album, stating, "Local Natives are frank in their presentation of a serious album, challenging listeners to heal along with them; cognizant that investment is proportional to remuneration". Larry Fitzmaurice of Pitchfork concluded that, "With Hummingbird, Local Natives have made a thoughtful, lovely album with small gestures that provide great rewards". CMJ's review states that "they were scratching at the surface of their emotional capabilities on their debut. With Hummingbird, Local Natives show that they can dig deeper".

Will Butler of The A.V. Club stated that it "is an album of hidden rewards, a record to pick and choose tracks from in order to purvey a single feeling or contribute to the perfect mixtape. What it’s not, though, is a cohesive, compelling whole". Magnet offered a critique of the album, stating "Unwilling or unable to ascend the vertiginous heights of 2009 debut Gorilla Manor, Hummingbird instead buries its beak in the sand."

== Track listing ==
All songs written by Local Natives; "Heavy Feet", "Breakers", and "Wooly Mammoth" co-written by Aaron Dessner. All tracks produced by Local Natives and Aaron Dessner; "Mt. Washington" also produced by Raymond Richards.

No.	Title	Length
1.	"You & I"	4:22
2.	"Heavy Feet"	4:07
3.	"Ceilings"	2:56
4.	"Black Spot"	4:41
5.	"Breakers"	4:09
6.	"Three Months"	4:30
7.	"Black Balloons"	3:08
8.	"Wooly Mammoth"	3:27
9.	"Mt. Washington"	3:19
10.	"Colombia"	4:50
11.	"Bowery"	4:37
Total length:		44:06

Deluxe edition bonus tracks
No.	Title	Length
12.	"Palms"	4:32
13.	"11:11"	3:44
14.	"Ingrid"	4:25
Total length:		56:47

== Personnel ==
Credits adapted from the album's liner notes.

Local Natives

- Taylor Rice – lead vocals, rhythm guitar, bass guitar
- Kelcey Ayer – lead vocals, keyboards, piano, percussion, rhythm guitar, harmonium, glockenspiel
- Ryan Hahn – lead guitar, bass guitar, keyboards, backing vocals, mandolin
- Matt Frazier – drums, percussion

Additional musicians

- Aaron Dessner – additional guitar (tracks 2, 5) claps, additional bass (track 5), additional organ (6), bass (tracks 7–8), tambourine, bass pedals, organ, MS-20, horn arrangement (track 9)
- Raymond Richards – upright bass (track 9)
- Yuki Numata – violin (tracks 2, 6, 10)
- Beth Meyers – viola (tracks 2, 6, 10)
- Clarice Jensen – cello (tracks 2, 4, 6, 10)
- Dave Nelson – trombone (tracks 1–2, 6, 9–10)
- Bryce Dessner – string and horn arrangement (tracks 1, 2, 6, 10)

Production

- Local Natives – production, art direction, pre-production
- Aaron Dessner – production, engineering, recording, additional pre-production
- Marcus Paquin – engineering (tracks 1–8, 10–14)
- Peter Katis – mixing (tracks 1–8, 10–14)
- Greg Georgio – additional mixing (tracks 1–8, 10–14)
- Raymond Richards – production, engineering (track 9)
- Mike Post – engineering (track 9)
- Jonathan Low – mixing (track 9)
- Brian McTear – mixing (track 9)
- Bennett Paster – additional recording
